= Jason Connery =

British actor (born 1963)

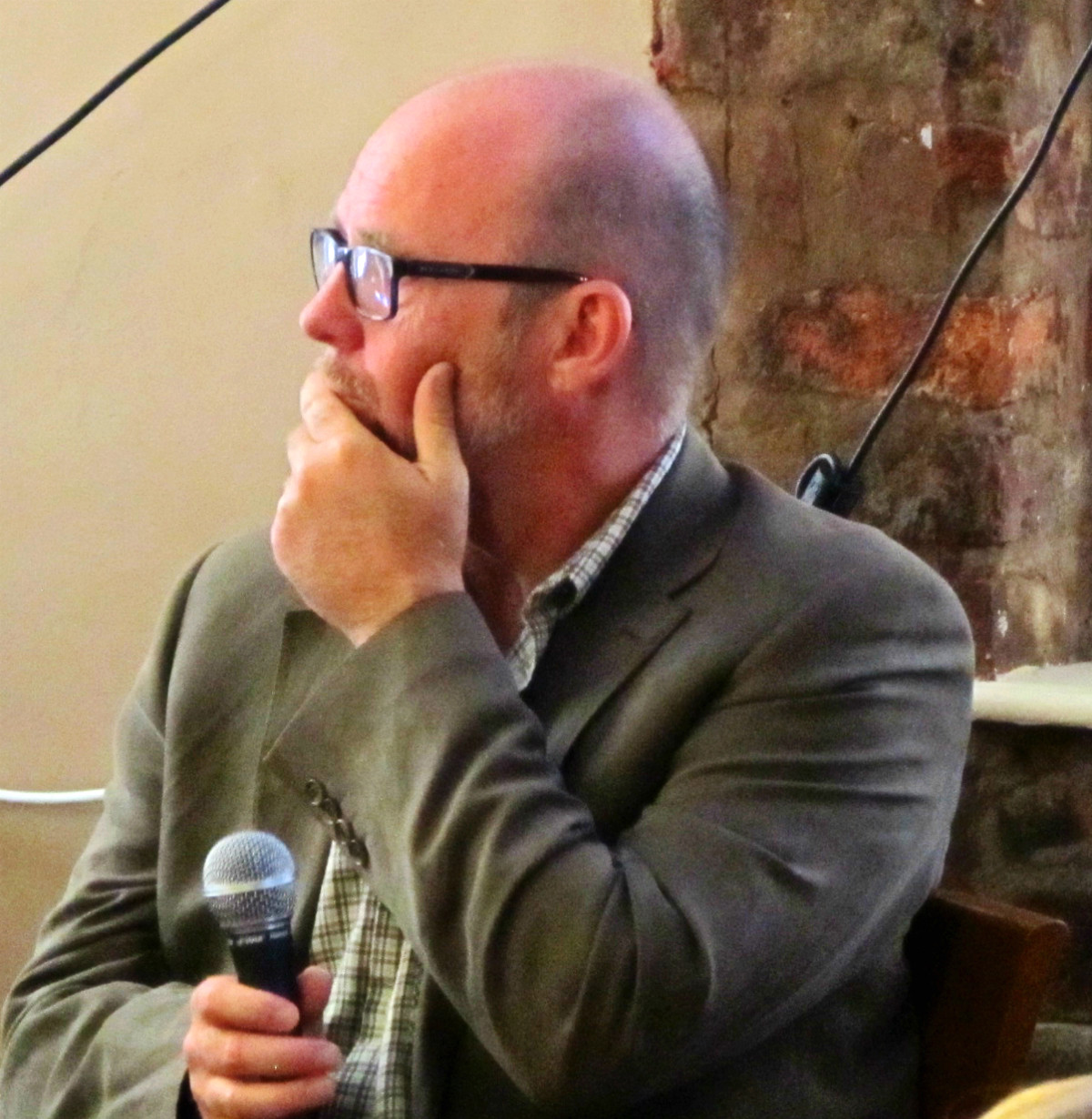
- Connery at Doctor Who convention in West Kirby in 2015
- Born: Jason Joseph Connery; 11 January 1963 (age 63); Rome, Italy
- Occupations: Actor; director
- Years active: 1983–present
- Spouses: Mia Sara (m. 1996; div. 2002) Fiona Ufton (m. 2021)
- Children: 1
- Parents: Sean Connery; Diane Cilento
- Relatives: Charles Thomas McGlew (great-grandfather); Raphael Cilento (grandfather); Phyllis Cilento (grandmother); Margaret Cilento (aunt); Neil Connery (uncle)

Jason Joseph Connery (born 11 January 1963) is a British actor and director. He is the son of Sean Connery and Diane Cilento. On screen, he is best known for appearing in the third series of the ITV drama series Robin of Sherwood in 1986. He took over the main role after Michael Praed's character was killed off at the end of the second series.

== Early life ==
Connery was born 11 January 1963 in Rome and raised in London. He is the son of Australian actress Diane Cilento and Scottish actor Sean Connery. He attended Sherborne Primary School in Gloucestershire before going on to Millfield School, a co-educational private school in the town of Street, in Somerset, England, and later the independent Gordonstoun School in Moray, Scotland. He was later accepted into the Bristol Old Vic Theatre School.

== Career ==
Connery performed many roles in theatre and subsequently had parts in several B-films. His film début was in The Lords of Discipline (1983). He appeared in the Doctor Who serial Vengeance on Varos in 1985. He also portrayed Robin Hood in the final series of the television series Robin of Sherwood in 1986.

He later portrayed James Bond creator Ian Fleming in the 1990 television drama Spymaker: The Secret Life of Ian Fleming. In 1997, he appeared in a fantasy film (originally intended as a pilot episode for a longer series) playing the title role of Merlin in Merlin: The Quest Begins, directed by David Winning. He appeared in Faithful Dealing (2001) in London, an English Restoration Whodunit, produced by Dominic Madden. In 2003, he toured with a stage production of The Blue Room. In 2004 he was a main character in the children's show Shoebox Zoo and returned in the second series in September 2005.

Connery had starring roles in several horror films, including Lightspeed (2006), Night Skies (2007) and Brotherhood of Blood (2007).

In 2014 he took part in BBC One's Celebrity MasterChef and featured in the sitcom George Lopez (2002).

=== Directing ===
In 2008 he made his directorial début with the film Pandemic and in 2009 directed The Devil's Tomb. Connery directed the 2011 "After Dark Originals" film 51, and The Philly Kid (2012) for the "After Dark Action" series.

In 2016, Connery directed Tommy's Honour, a film celebrating the lives of golf pioneers Old Tom Morris and Young Tom Morris. The film opened the 2016 Edinburgh International Film Festival on 15 June 2016, and won Best Feature Film at the 2016 British Academy Scotland Awards.

== Personal life ==
Connery met American actress Mia Sara during the making of Bullet to Beijing in Russia. They married and had a son, Dashiell Quinn Connery (b. 1997) who is also an actor. The couple divorced in 2002.

In April 2021, he married Fiona Ufton, his partner of five years.

== Filmography ==
=== Acting ===
Year	Film	Role	Notes	Director
1983	The Lords of Discipline	MacKinnon		Franc Roddam
1984	The Boy Who Had Everything	John Kirkland		Stephen Wallace
1984	The First Olympics: Athens 1896	Thomas Pelham Curtis		Alvin Rakoff
1984	Nemo	Nemo (teen)		Arnaud Sélignac
1985	Doctor Who: Vengeance on Varos	Jondar	TV series	Ron Jones
1986	The Venetian Woman	Jules		Mauro Bolognini
1986	Robin of Sherwood	Robin / Robert of Huntingdon	TV series	Sid Roberson; Gerry Mill; Robert Young; James Allen; Dennis Abey; Christopher King; Ben Bolt
1987	Worlds Beyond		TV series	Sue Butterworth
1988	Bye Bye Baby	Marcello		Enrico Oldoini
1988	Puss in Boots	Corin		Eugene Marner
1988	Lenin: The Train	David	TV	Damiano Damiani
1989	Tank Malling	Dunboyne		James Marcus
1989	Casablanca Express	Alan Cooper		Sergio Martino
1990	Spymaker: The Secret Life of Ian Fleming	Ian Fleming	TV	Ferdinand Fairfax
1991	Mountain of Diamonds	Michael Courteney	TV	Jeannot Szwarc
1992	Beauty and the Beast (Bevanfield Films)	Beast (voice)	TV	Timothy Forder
1992	The Sheltering Desert	Henno Martin		Regardt van den Bergh
1992	The Other Side of Paradise	Christopher "Kit" Masters	TV	Renny Rye
1992	Aladdin (Bevanfield Films)	The Vizier	TV	David Thwaytes
1994	Jamila	Daniyar		Monica Teuber
1995	Bullet to Beijing	Nikolai "Nick" Petrov		George Mihalka
1995	Midnight in Saint Petersburg	Nikolai "Nick" Petrov		Douglas Ryan Jackson
1996	The Successor	Peter Reardon / Romanov		Rodoh Seji
1997	Macbeth	Macbeth		Jeremy Freeston
1997	Casualty	James Dunham	TV series	Beryl Richards
1997	The Famous Five	Jeff Thomas	TV series	John Gorrie
1998	Urban Ghost Story	John Fox		Geneviéve Jolliffe
1998	Merlin: The Quest Begins	Young Merlin	TV	David Winning
2000	Shanghai Noon	Calvin Andrews		Tom Dey
2000	The Strip	Ray Burden	TV series	
2001	Nicolas			Peter Shaner
2001	Requiem	Mr. Hunter		Jon Kirby
2001	Wishmaster 3: Beyond the Gates of Hell	Professor Joel Barash	TV	Chris Angel
2001–2002	Mary-Kate and Ashley in Action!	Bennington (voice)	TV series	
2002	Liberty's Kids: Est. 1776	voice	TV series	
2001–2003	Smallville	Dominic Sanatori	TV series	Greg Beeman; Terrence O'Hara; Kenneth Biller
2003	Gadget & the Gadgetinis	Voice The League of Extraordinary Gentlemen		Bruno Bianchi
2004–2005	Shoebox Zoo	Dad (Series 1: eps 1 to 13, Series 2: eps 1, 9–13)	TV series	
2005	Private Moments	Gillian		Jag Mundhra
2005	Amateur	Man on Television	Short	Joshua Adler
2005–2006	Trollz	Mr. Trollheimer (voice)		Karen Hyden
2006	The Wild	Flamingo (voice)		Steve 'Spaz' Williams
2006	Lightspeed	Daniel Leight / Lightspeed	TV	Don E. Fauntleroy
2006	The Lord of the Rings: The Battle for Middle-earth II: The Rise of the Witch-king	Captain Carthedan / Karsh the Whisperer	Video Game	Jill Donald
2006	The Far Side of Jericho	John		Tim Hunter
2006	Hoboken Hollow	Trevor Lloyd		Glen Stephens
2007	The Thirst: Blood War	Cladius		Tom Shell
2007	Night Skies	Richard		Roy Knyrim
2007	George Lopez	Mike	TV series	Joe Regalbuto
2007	Velocity	Mic		Jeff Jensen
2007	Brotherhood of Blood	Keaton		Michael Roesch; Peter Scheerer
2007	An Accidental Christmas	Myles	TV	Fred Olen Ray
2008	I Am Somebody: No Chance in Hell	Sam	Original title: Chinaman's Chance: America's Other Slaves	Aki Aleong
2008	La Linea	Randall		James Cotten
2009	Alone in the Dark II	Parker		Michael Roesch; Peter Scheerer
2009	Dragonquest	Gurion		Mark Atkins
2010	Kane & Lynch 2: Dog Days	Glazer	Video Game	
2010	The Search for Santa Paws	Haggis		
2010	Old West	Frank	Short	
2011	Criminal Minds: Suspect Behavior	John Clayford	TV series	
2011	Sword	Robert Teasdale	Short	
2014	Alien Strain	Psychiatrist		
2019	The Untold Story	Adam		
