= Michael Roesch =

Film producer

Michael Roesch (born April 24, 1974) is a film producer, screenwriter, and director. He collaborates on his movies with fellow filmmaker Peter Scheerer.

== Biography ==
A movie aficionado since he was a kid, Michael Roesch started shooting short 8 mm movies at age 12. While he was at college, he worked as a film journalist for several newspapers and magazines. Later, he started together with his writing partner Peter Scheerer a successful career as a screenwriter, and worked in various production capacities. Among their screenwriting credits are Alone in the Dark, House of the Dead 2, and Far Cry.

In 2006, Roesch and Scheerer directed their first feature, the vampire thriller Brotherhood of Blood, starring Victoria Pratt, Sid Haig and Ken Foree. The movie had its world premiere at the prestigious Sitges Film Festival in Spain in October 2007. In the US and Canada, Sam Raimi's label Ghosthouse Underground acquired the movie and released it through Lionsgate.

In 2007, Roesch and Scheerer directed Alone in the Dark II, starring Rick Yune, Lance Henriksen, and Danny Trejo. It is a sequel to the 2005 film Alone in the Dark.

Among Roesch's recent work as a producer is Prisoners of the Sun, directed by Academy Award winner Roger Christian and starring John Rhys-Davies and Carmen Chaplin.

== Filmography ==
- First Shift: Redemption (TBA) (producer)
- First Shift: Vengeance (TBA) (producer)
- 23 Years Later: The Castle of the Dead (2027) (producer)
- Citizen Vigilante (2026) (executive producer)
- Run (2025) (producer)
- First Shift (2024) (producer)
- Birds of a Feather (2019) (associate producer)
- Female Fight Club (2016) (co-executive producer)
- Viy (2014) (co-executive producer)
- Prisoners of the Sun (2013) (co-producer)
- BloodRayne: The Third Reich (2011) (associate producer)
- Blubberella (2011) (associate producer)
- Far Cry (2008) (screenwriter)
- Alone in the Dark II (2008) (director, screenwriter)
- In the Name of the King (2007) (associate producer)
- Brotherhood of Blood (2006) (director, screenwriter)
- BloodRayne (2006) (associate producer)
- House of the Dead 2 (2005) (screenwriter)
- Alone in the Dark (2005) (screenwriter)
- House of the Dead (2003) (co-executive producer)
