= Ona Grauer =

Canadian actress

- Born: Mexico
- Citizenship: Canadian
- Occupation: Actress
- Years active: 1996–present

Ona Grauer is a Canadian actress, best known for her portrayal of the Ancient Ayiana and later Emily Young in the science fiction television series Stargate Universe, part of the Stargate franchise. In the FX show Archer, she voices recurring character Katya Kazanova, and a woman impersonating film star Veronica Deane.

== Filmography ==
=== Film ===
Year	Title	Role	Notes
2000	Beautiful Joe	Ariel	
2000	My 5 Wives	Poolside Cocktail Waitress	
2003	House of the Dead	Alicia	
2003	The Lizzie McGuire Movie	Model #1	
2004	Catwoman	Sandy	
2005	Alone in the Dark	Agent Feenstra	
2006	Firewall	Waitress	
2010	Percy Jackson & the Olympians: The Lightning Thief	Artemis	
2013	Elysium	CCB Agent	
2013	That Burning Feeling	Calista Whitacre	
2016	A Christmas to Remember	Brooke Hanson	
2019	Come to Daddy	Precious	

=== Television ===
Year	Title	Role	Notes
1996	Sliders	Debra	Episode: "Love Gods"
1997	Breaker High	Lena	Episode: "Stowing Pains"
1998	The Net	Mori	Episode: "Sample"
1999, 2000	First Wave	Olivia / Taryn	Episodes: "Lost Souls", "Terminal City"
2000	Seven Days	Leslie Dixon	Episode: "Space Station Down"
2000	Harsh Realm	Pretty Young Woman	Episode: "Three Percenters"
2000	First Target	Nina Stahl	TV movie
2000	The Christmas Secret	Ms. Isakson	TV movie
2001	Freedom	Lt. Fallon	Episode: "Mind Game"
2002	Beyond Belief: Fact or Fiction	Martha	Segment: "Night Walker"
2002	Romantic Comedy 101	Deanna	TV movie
2002	Stargate SG-1	Ayiana	Episode: "Frozen"
2002	We'll Meet Again	Anna Marie Scalli	TV movie
2002–2003	John Doe	Theresa	Episodes: "Pilot", "Remote Control", "The Rising"
2003	1st to Die	Becky DeGraaff	TV movie
2003	Out of Order	Escort	TV miniseries
2003	Black Sash	Beth Rodgers	6 episodes
2003	Tarzan	Alice Clayton	Episode: "Pilot"
2003	Andromeda	Melea	Episode: "Harper/Delete"
2004	Perfect Romance	Peter's Girlfriend	TV movie
2004	Deep Evil	Dr. Cole	TV movie
2004	Stargate Atlantis	Ayiana	Episode: "Rising"
2004	Smallville	Dr. Gabrielle Vaughan	Episode: "Crusade"
2004–2006	The Collector	Katrina	17 episodes
2005	Ladies Night	Emily Morgan	TV movie
2005	The L Word	Sandy	Episode: "Luminous"
2005	Behind the Camera: The Unauthorized Story of 'Mork & Mindy'	Raquel Welch	TV movie
2005	Young Blades	Emanuelle	Episode: "Coat of Arms"
2005	Murder at the Presidio	Kathy Tucker	TV movie
2005	Intelligence	Katarina	TV movie
2006	Godiva's	Annie	Episode: "Floodgates"
2006	Three Moons Over Milford	Sarah Louise	4 episodes
2006–2007	Intelligence	Katarina Weigel	16 episodes
2007	Supernatural	Crossroads Demon	Episode: "All Hell Breaks Loose: Part 2"
2007	Flash Gordon	Genessa	Episode: "Conspiracy Theory"
2008	Lost Behind Bars	Amanda Watson	TV movie
2008	Yeti: Curse of the Snow Demon	Fury	TV movie
2009	Flashpoint	Irina Kazkov	Episode: "The Fortress"
2009	Encounter with Danger	Carrie	TV movie
2009	Stargate Universe	Emily Young	4 episodes
2010	The Bridge	Abby St. James	12 episodes
2010	Smoke Screen	Miranda	TV movie
2011	V	Kerry Eltoff	3 episodes
2011–2016, 2023	Archer	Katya Kazanova / Veronica Deane Impersonator (voice)	Recurring role
2012	Fringe	Diana Sutter	Episode: "A Short Story About Love"
2012	Seattle Superstorm	Lt. Cmdr. Emma Peterson	TV movie
2013	Arrow	Vivian	Episode: "Betrayal"
2013	Profile for Murder	Dr. Michelle	TV movie
2013	After All These Years	Christine	TV movie
2013	Cult	Lexi	4 episodes
2014	Arctic Air	Connie Jackowski	Episode: "The Finish Line"
2014	Motive	Victoria Hill	Episode: "Nobody Lives Forever"
2014	Mom's Day Away	Trish	TV movie
2015	Truth&Lies	Hannah's Mom	TV movie; also known as Text to Kill
2015	The Whispers	Meg (Jane's mother)	4 episodes
2015	iZombie	Taylor Fowler	Episode: "Real Dead Housewife of Seattle"
2016	Garage Sale Mystery: The Art of Murder	Sydney	TV movie
2017	Christmas Princess	Sharon	TV movie
