= Center for Global Dialogue and Cooperation =

Austrian-based international NGO

- Founder: Petar Stoyanov, Stamen Stantchev, Walter Schwimmer, Werner Fasslabend, Etienne Declercq
- Location: Vienna, Austria
- Key people: Petar Stoyanov (President); Stamen Stantchev (Secretary General)
- Website: http://www.cgdc.eu

The Center for Global Dialogue and Cooperation (CGDC) is an Austrian international non-governmental organisation. The foundation's headquarters is in Vienna. Its founding members are the former President of Bulgaria, Petar Stoyanov, Bulgarian consultant Stamen Stantchev, former Austrian conservative politician Walter Schwimmer, former Austrian minister of defence Werner Fasslabend and Belgian businessman Etienne Declercq.

== Establishment and mission ==
The aim of the foundation is, according to their official website, to support emerging countries "in becoming more efficient, capable and stable partners in Europe and worldwide."”

== International Board ==
Members of the board of trustees are Abdul Latif Al Meer, Sukhbaatar Batbold, Hartmut Beyer, Wesley Kanne Clark, Natalia Corrales-Díez, Mário Henrique de Almeida Santos David, Jeff Greene, Mikhail Gutseriev, Karim Farouk Jalloul, Hemant Kanoria, Thomas Peter Limberger, José María Figueres Olsen, Gerry van der Sluys, Carmine S. Villani, Rick Yune.

== Annual gala ==
CGDC organises an annual gala. In 2012 the organizers invited Bill Clinton to give a speech, for which he received 500,000 dollars. In 2013 Clinton was again invited but did not show up, amid speculation about a conviction against CGDC secretary general Stamen Stantchev by a Romanian court.

The President of the European Commission José Manuel Barroso did take part in the ceremony, where he received the Center for Global Dialogue and Cooperation’s Award for “Enhancing Mutual Understanding and Dialogue amongst Diverse People” at the closing event of the 3rd Center’s Annual Meeting.

== Legal allegations ==
In December 2013 a Romanian court sentenced CGDC secretary general Stamen Stantchev in absentia to 11 years in prison. Two former Romanian ministers were also convicted. The court ruled that the group had formed an international criminal organisation and stole state secrets. Austrian police has also started investigations involving shady privatisation deals in the Romanian energy sector. Stantchev was already imprisoned in 2006 in connection with similar accusations.
