= Peter Scheerer =

German film producer

Peter Scheerer (born 16 December 1973) is a German film producer, screenwriter, and director. He collaborates on his movies with fellow filmmaker Michael Roesch.

== Biography ==
A film fan since his early childhood, Scheerer started shooting short 8 mm movies while he was in high school. After college, Scheerer worked in advertising. Later, he started together with his writing partner Michael Roesch a successful career as a screenwriter, and worked in various production capacities. Among their screenwriting credits are Alone in the Dark, House of the Dead 2, and Far Cry.

In 2006, Roesch and Scheerer directed their first feature, the vampire thriller Brotherhood of Blood, starring Victoria Pratt, Sid Haig and Ken Foree. The movie had its world premiere at the prestigious Sitges Film Festival in Sitges, Spain in October 2007.

In 2007, Roesch and Scheerer directed Alone in the Dark II, starring Rick Yune, Lance Henriksen and Danny Trejo. It is a sequel to the 2005 film Alone in the Dark.

== Filmography ==
- Alone in the Dark II (2008) (director, screenwriter)
- Far Cry (2008) (screenwriter)
- In the Name of the King: A Dungeon Siege Tale (2007) (associate producer)
- Brotherhood of Blood (2006) (director, screenwriter)
- BloodRayne (2006) (associate producer)
- House of the Dead 2 (2005) (screenwriter)
- Alone in the Dark (2005) (screenwriter)
