= Wolfgang Herold =

German film producer and sound supervisor

Wolfgang Herold is a German film producer and sound supervisor. He gained his first experience working with sound at the AFN TV and radio stations in Germany and created production music for his own publishing company. Wolfgang Herold has been giving films a "voice" since he founded his sound studios in Frankfurt/Main, Germany in 1988. The company first focused on advertising and music, but Herold Studios has since shifted its emphasis to mixing feature films. In 1993 Wolfgang Herold introduced the D.A.N. Digital Audio Network system, a new production form for sound studios that enabled voice recordings via digital phone lines (ISDN).

In 2001, he founded a film production company, Herold Productions GmbH, for concept development, co-financing, and co-production of international feature-length films. Its productions include Uwe Boll films such as Alone in the Dark, In the Name of the King: A Dungeon Siege Tale, and Far Cry. Wolfgang Herold is also active as a music supervisor and soundtrack producer. He won both gold and platinum awards for his collaboration with Nightwish for the soundtrack of Alone in the Dark.

Wolfgang Herold is member of the Deutsche Filmakademie e.V.

== Awards ==
Special Jury Prize of the Hessian Film Prize 2007 as Executive Producer of In the Name of the King - A Dungeon Siege Tale

== Filmography ==
- The Taste of Apple Seeds (2013, co-producer)
- Die schwarzen Brüder (2013, co-producer)
- Homies (2011, co-producer)
- Max Schmeling (2010, producer)
- BloodRayne 3 (2010, associate producer)
- Alone in the Dark II (2009, V, co-executive producer)
- Far Cry (2008, executive producer)
- The Bridge (2008, TV; co-producer)
- Brotherhood of Blood (2007, co-producer)
- In the Name of the King (2007, executive producer)
- You Am I (2006, executive producer)
- BloodRayne (2005, executive producer)
- Alone in the Dark (2005, executive producer)
- Surviving the Terror (2005, associate producer)
- Castro (2003, TV; associate producer) (international version)
- House of the Dead (2003, producer)
- Heart of America (2003, executive producer)
- Blackwoods (2002, executive producer)
- Missing Link (1999, associate producer)
