= Everyone (film) =

- Original film poster
- Directed by: Bill Marchant
- Screenplay by: Bill Marchant
- Produced by: Christine Lawrance; Bill Marchant; Stephen Park
- Starring: Matt Fentiman; Mark Hildreth
- Cinematography: Jane Weitzel
- Edited by: Tony Dean Smith
- Music by: Mary Ancheta
- Production company: Everyone Productions
- Distributed by: TLA Releasing
- Release date: August 27, 2004 (MWFF)
- Running time: 90 minutes
- Country: Canada
- Language: English

Everyone is a Canadian comedy-drama film, written and directed by Bill Marchant and released in 2004. The film centres on a gay couple, Ryan (Matt Fentiman) and Grant (Mark Hildreth), who are having a wedding ceremony in their backyard, only to find that many of their guests have brought their own family dramas and dysfunctions.

The film premiered at the Montreal World Film Festival in 2004.

== Cast ==
Starring

- Matt Fentiman as Ryan
- Mark Hildreth as Grant
- Brendan Fletcher as Dylan

Other cast

(in alphabetical order)

- Katherine Billings as Rebecca
- Michael Chase as Gale
- Suzanne Hepburn as Trish
- Bill Marchant as Shepard
- Cara McDowell as Rachel
- Andrew Moxham as Kalvin
- Stephen Park as Luke
- Carly Pope as Rena
- Tom Scholte as Roger
- Nancy Sivak as Madeline
- Debra Thorne as Betty
- Anna Williams as Jenny

== Awards ==
At the Montreal World Film Festival, the film won the Golden Zenith Prize for Best Canadian Film. At the Inside Out Film and Video Festival in 2005, it won the award for Best Canadian Film.

At the 2004 Vancouver International Film Festival, the film was one of the runners-up for the Most Popular Canadian Film award.
