= National Lampoon's Thanksgiving Family Reunion =

2003 television film directed by Neal Israel

- DVD cover
- Genre: Comedy
- Written by: Marc Warren; Dennis Rinsler
- Directed by: Neal Israel
- Starring: Bryan Cranston; Judge Reinhold; Penelope Ann Miller
- Music by: Robert Folk
- Country of origin: United States
- Original language: English

Production
- Executive producer: Gary Hoffman
- Producer: James Shavick
- Cinematography: Robert E. Seaman
- Editor: Lee Haxall
- Running time: 91 minutes
- Production companies: National Lampoon Productions; Relatively Crazy Productions

Original release
- Network: TBS Superstation
- Release: November 23, 2003

National Lampoon's Thanksgiving Family Reunion is a 2003 American comedy television film about a Thanksgiving family reunion of the Sniders, starring Bryan Cranston as Woodrow Snider, Judge Reinhold as Dr. Mitch Snider and Penelope Ann Miller as Jill Snider. The film premiered on TBS Superstation on November 23, 2003. The film was released as National Lampoon's Holiday Reunion in some regions.

== Cast ==
- Bryan Cranston – Woodrow Snider
- Judge Reinhold – Dr. Mitch Snider
- Penelope Ann Miller – Pauline Snider
- Hallie Todd – Jill Snider
- Meghan Ory – Allison Snider
- Calum Worthy – Danny Snider
- Britt Irvin – Twig Snider
- Reece Thompson – Harley Snider
- Antony Holland – Uncle Phil
- David Paetkau – Jimmy Hodges
- Garry Chalk – Fred Hodges
- Noel Fisher – Buzz Hodges
- Paul McGillion – Sheriff Kirkland
- Kris Pope – Jock #2
- Dagmar Midcap – TV Reporter

== See also ==
- List of National Lampoon films
