= Valerie on the Stairs =

- Masters of Horror episode
- Poster art
- Episode no.: Season 2 Episode 8
- Directed by: Mick Garris
- Written by: Mick Garris
- Production code: 208
- Original air date: December 29, 2006

Guest appearances
- Tyron Leitso; Clare Grant; Christopher Lloyd; Tony Todd

Episode chronology
| ← Previous "The Screwfly Solution" | Next → "Right to Die" |

"Valerie on the Stairs" is the eighth episode of the second season of Masters of Horror. The episode was directed by Mick Garris and is based on the Clive Barker story of the same name.

== Plot ==
Rob Hanisey (Tyron Leitso) is an unsuccessful writer who has been dumped by his girlfriend Anna. After the suicide of the previous tenant, Terry, Rob is accepted to the Highberger House, where he has strange encounters with a beautiful girl, Valerie (Clare Grant), who asks for his help. The other tenants, especially Patricia Dunbar, are annoyed with the noise he makes when chasing Valerie. Only Bruce Sweetland remains friendly. Valerie asks Rob to save her from the Beast (Tony Todd), but is violently captured and taken inside a wall by a dark supernatural force. This results in more intense episodes of Rob yelling at the wall, which makes the other tenants angrier, except for Bruce and the old Everett Neely (Christopher Lloyd).

Bruce and Rob talk about the existence of Valerie, which Bruce finds funny. Rob discovers a manuscript titled Valerie on the Stairs written by Bruce, Patricia and Everett. This discovery infuriates Bruce and he attacks Rob. Later, Valerie appears in Bruce's room, who is stunned that she is alive; the Beast appears and murders Bruce. Rob visits Everett and discovers an old movie poster depicting the Beast. The movie was adapted from the novel of Neil Everest, which turns out to be Everett's real name. Rob confronts him but he denies the existence of the Beast and Valerie. After discovering Bruce's body, Rob is sure that Valerie and the Beast are the creation of Bruce, Patricia and Everett, and they came alive. Angered, Patricia storms off to pack up and leave. Just then, Valerie appears for a last kiss. It turns out that Patricia created Valerie as a love-ideal for her. However, the Beast also murders Patricia. Rob and Everett find her dying, and after a heated argument, Everett confesses that they wrote the whole story together and couldn't stop continuing the torture and the horror, which was Bruce's specialty.

Rob breaks a hole in the wall and asks Everett what is there. Everett admits it is the Beast's torture chamber and they fed a lot of unfortunate girls to him. He starts to suspect that Rob must be Bruce's creation, which Rob does not believe. They enter the chamber and find the skeletons of the girls lured inside. One of them is Anna, who murders Everett. Rob finds the Beast and, fighting for Valerie, kills the monster.

Rob forces Valerie out into the open against her will and she vaporizes. The police arrive and order Rob to surrender. Rob watches in horror as his skin turns white with typewritten words on it, and his body transforms into typewritten pages. The last one says: "And so it came to pass that Rob Hanisey never became a published author."

== Reception ==
Jon Condit of Dread Central rated the episode 1/5, stating that, "To put it succinctly (and please pardon the cheese), watching 'Valerie on the Stairs' is as about as enjoyable as falling down a flight." Danette Chavez of The A.V. Club wrote, "Not even the presence of horror stalwart Tony Todd can liven up 'Valerie On The Stairs,' a dull treatise on the power of the written word." Ian Jane of DVD Talk opined that, despite a good premise, quality source material and standout performances from Todd and Lloyd, "The movie just feels limp, the story doesn't have the impact it needs to really hit home and it doesn't move fast enough for us to look past this even if there are moments where it looks like it's trying."
