= Spymaker: The Secret Life of Ian Fleming =

1990 film by Ferdinand Fairfax

- Written by: Robert J. Avrech
- Directed by: Ferdinand Fairfax
- Starring: Jason Connery; Kristin Scott Thomas; Joss Ackland; Patricia Hodge; David Warner
- Music by: Carl Davis
- Country of origin: United States
- Original language: English

Production
- Producer: Aida Young
- Cinematography: Mike Southon
- Editor: Lesley Walker
- Running time: 100 minutes

Original release
- Release: March 5, 1990

Spymaker: The Secret Life of Ian Fleming is a 1990 TV biographical film of the life of Ian Fleming, creator of the James Bond spy character, retracing his playboy youth, his expulsion from several colleges, his experiences as a newspaper writer and his tour of duty for the British intelligence agency during World War II. Fleming himself is played by Jason Connery, son of Sean Connery, the actor who first played Bond in the film series. Ex-Bond girl Fiona Fullerton, who appeared in A View to a Kill, made an appearance.

== Plot ==
The film follows the exciting life of a dashing young Ian Fleming, the mastermind behind the highly successful James Bond books and movies. As a womanizer and a romantic Fleming got himself expelled from Eton and other prestigious public schools before his mother sent him to work for the news bureau Reuters. Whilst covering a show-trial of British engineers in Soviet Moscow, Fleming caught the interest of Britain's dormant yet watchful military intelligence, later to become S.O.E. After Fleming's recruitment into His Majesty's Service, his exploits become increasingly fantastic.

== Cast ==
- Jason Connery as Ian Fleming
- Kristin Scott Thomas as Leda St Gabriel
- Joss Ackland as German SS Generaloberst Hielstien
- Patricia Hodge as Lady Evelyn Fleming
- David Warner as Admiral Godfrey, S.O.E. Military Intelligence
- Colin Welland as Reuters World News Editor
- Fiona Fullerton as Lady Caroline Hornsby
- Richard Johnson as General Hornsby
- Julian Firth as Quincy
- Marsha Fitzalan as Miss Delaney
- Ingrid Held as Countess De Turbinville
- Hugo Bower as German SS Major
- Clive Mantle as Marine Sergeant Ellis
- Leo Fenn as young Ian Fleming
- Tara McGowran as Daphne
- Edita Brychta as Maya
- Octavia Verdin as Colette
- Brendon Nolan as S.O.E. Agent
- Kate Humble as The Red-Head (credited as Lauren Heston)
- Robert Longden as Professor Whitman

== Production ==
Producer Edgar Scherick called the movie a fake.

I thought that up. I just wanted to get into business with [executive] Scott Sassa who was over at Turner Broadcasting. It was the first movie they made. I knew that Ian Fleming had a house in the West Indies. So I thought we should make up a story about his life. We made the movie with Sean Connery's son [Jason], a very nice looking young man. I don't know what happened to him. I thought he was going to be a prominent actor.
