= Brotherhood of Blood =

- Directed by: Michael Roesch; Peter Scheerer
- Written by: Michael Roesch; Peter Scheerer
- Produced by: Juergen Popp; Nicole Ackermann; Mark Burman; Wolfgang Herold
- Starring: Victoria Pratt; Sid Haig; Ken Foree
- Distributed by: Lionsgate; Ghost House Underground
- Release dates: October 11, 2007 (Sitges - Catalan International Film Festival); October 14, 2008 (United States)
- Running time: 88 minutes
- Countries: United States; Germany
- Language: English

Brotherhood of Blood is a 2007 American-German horror film, starring Victoria Pratt, Sid Haig, Jason Connery, and Ken Foree, directed by Peter Scheerer and Michael Roesch. The film was shot in 12 days. It had its world premiere at the Sitges Film Festival in Sitges, Spain in October 2007.

For the release in the US and Canada, Sam Raimi's label Ghosthouse Underground has picked up the film. It was released on home video in North America through Lionsgate on October 14, 2008.

== Plot ==
Brotherhood of Blood is a claustrophobic thriller about a team of vampire hunters who infiltrate a nest of undead to rescue one of their own.

Carrie Rieger tugs at her bonds. The young vampire huntress has to free herself. Guarded by vampires, chained in a dark cellar by the mighty vampire King Pashek, her time is running out. She knows an even greater threat than the vampires is coming relentlessly closer. Everything will be decided tonight.

Carrie has crossed a dangerous trail: Back from a faraway journey, a man slowly transforms into a vampire. He transforms further - into something that even the vampires fear; the mighty vampire demon Vlad Kossei.

The vampire sovereigns killed Kossei many hundreds of years ago, but now he has seemingly returned. In his new body, he will take revenge and destroy everything in his way. There is only one hunter who can stop him.

== Cast ==
- Victoria Pratt as Carrie Rieger
- Sid Haig as Pashek
- Ken Foree as Stanis
- Jason Connery as Keaton
- William Snow as Thomas
- Wes Ramsey as Fork
- Jeremy Kissner as Derek
- Rachel Grant as Jill
- Marc Ian Sklar as Torreck

== External links and sources ==
- Brotherhood of Blood at IMDb
- Official website
- Brotherhood of Blood at the website of the US distributor Ghost House
- Brotherhood of Blood at Rotten Tomatoes
