= Blue Demon (film) =

- Directed by: Daniel Grodnik
- Written by: Brett Thompson; Lisa Morton; Ron Oliver; Daniel Grodnik
- Produced by: Daniel Grodnik
- Starring: Dedee Pfeiffer; Randall Batinkoff; Danny Woodburn; Josh Hammond; Jeff Fahey
- Music by: Christopher Farrell
- Release date: 2004
- Running time: 91 minutes
- Country: United States
- Language: English

Blue Demon is a 2004 American direct-to-video science fiction horror film directed by Daniel Grodnik and starring Dedee Pfeiffer, Randall Batinkoff, Danny Woodburn, Josh Hammond, and Jeff Fahey.

== Plot ==
Husband and wife Nathan and Marla Collins are head researchers in the "Blue Demon" project, a project that involves planting computer chips into the brains of six sharks to be used for protecting the country. As a result of budget cuts, however, the electric fence used to keep the sharks near the marine lab is rendered without electricity, resulting in the sharks chewing a hole through it, escaping the enclosure, and attacking a group of college girls swimming in a nearby lake, eating one of them. Nathan and Marla are also in the midst of a divorce, with the divorce papers ready to be filed. Six weeks later, General Remora is sent to oversee the operations, with Nathan, Marla, and the project's financer Lawrence Van Allen giving a demonstration of the sharks' abilities. However, they're all found to have escaped, having eaten two divers that were sent to repair the hole in the fence before escaping to the lake. They attack a father and daughter who are fishing, although both manage to evade them.

When possible ties to a terrorist organization are discovered, Nathan is suspected, and taken into custody. Marla breaks him out, and they attempt to warn the Coast Guard of the sharks, to no avail. Van Allen, in the meantime, initiates a manhunt to find them. Marla tells Nathan that she discovered that the program used to control the sharks is actually a shadow program overlaying a real program used by an unknown hacker to control the sharks. They realize that somebody has been working on the inside. Meanwhile, a fisherman who was fishing with the father and daughter kills one of the sharks with a harpoon gun after it attacks a couple in the lake. Nathan and Marla discover that the sharks are heading towards a beach. While Marla attempts to regain control of their chips, Nathan attempts to warn beachgoers of the sharks. One is soon eaten by a shark, and Nathan is knocked unconscious while trying to evacuate other beachgoers.

Nathan awakens in a hospital where Marla reveals that she accidentally overloaded the chips, presumably killing all of the sharks, but Nathan recalls only seeing four sharks at the beach. Van Allen arrives, and tells them about the fisherman killing one of the sharks. They soon realize that their computer technician Avery Dashlow is controlling the alpha shark, "Red Dog". They go back to the lab to confront him, although Remora arrives, and reveals that he was the one who created the shadow program; Avery is his accomplice. He's doing it in order to increase the U.S.'s security by making them more aware of terrorist matters, using Red Dog as an asset to place bombs in various areas. Marla then subdues Remora while Avery attempts to escape.

Nathan and Marla chase Avery outside to discover a secret lab inside a truck. They discover that Red Dog is carrying a Russian plutonium bomb, set to detonate near the Golden Gate Bridge. Avery then injures Nathan, locks Marla in the truck, and attempts to drive away. Nathan engages in a chase with them, and Marla manages to regain control of Red Dog. In the ensuing chaos Avery crashes and is killed while Marla survives. Red Dog then begins to head back to the lab as a result of a default setting. Van Allen locks Remora in a room that the shark is approaching. The bomb then detonates, killing both Remora, and Red Dog.

Sometime later, Nathan and Marla are preparing to go to court with Van Allen to discuss their involvement in the project. Marla reveals that she didn't file the divorce papers, and the two kiss before heading inside.

== Cast ==
- Dedee Pfeiffer as Dr. Marla Collins, one of the lead scientists of the Blue Demon project along with her husband Nathan.
- Randall Batinkoff as Dr. Nathan Collins, one of the lead scientists of the Blue Demon project along with his wife Marla.
- Danny Woodburn as Lawrence Van Allen, the financer of the Blue Demon project.
- Josh Hammond as Avery Dashlow, a computer technician.
- Christine Lakin as Katie, a maintenance worker.
- Jeff Fahey as General Remora, a general sent to oversee the Blue Demon project.
- Angela Gots as Tanya
