= Yeti: Curse of the Snow Demon =

- Genre: Adventure; Horror
- Written by: Rafael Jordan
- Story by: Mark L. Lester
- Directed by: Paul Ziller
- Starring: Carly Pope; Marc Menard; Adam O'Byrne; Brandon Jay McLaren; Elfina Luk; Crystal Lowe; Kris Pope; Peter DeLuise; Ona Grauer; Christian Tessier; Josh Emerson; Ed Marinaro
- Theme music composer: Angelina Kennedy
- Countries of origin: United States; Canada
- Original language: English

Production
- Producer: Daniel Grodnik
- Cinematography: Curtis Petersen
- Editors: Yale Kozinski; Lewis Schoenbrun
- Running time: 87 minutes
- Production company: Grodfilm

Original release
- Network: Sci Fi Channel
- Release: November 8, 2008

Yeti: Curse of the Snow Demon is a 2008 horror film that was broadcast on the Sci Fi Channel on November 8, 2008. The film stars Carly Pope, Peter DeLuise, Ona Grauer, and Crystal Lowe. Its plot concerns a group of people who, after crashing their plane into the Himalayan Mountains, encounter the Yeti. This encounter sends them into a fight for survival. It is the fourteenth film in the Maneater film series.

== Plot ==
A college football team's plane crashes in the Himalayas. The survivors, consisting of Sarah, Peyton, Ravin, Ashley, Dennis, Kyra, Rice, Andrew, and Garcia, have only three energy bars for food. Finding a trail of blood, Garcia and Andrew find a cave that turns out to be the Yeti's lair. Garcia escapes, but the Yeti butchers Andrew. Soon afterward, Sarah sees one of the corpses being dragged away, but Peyton ignores her.

A search and rescue team, Fury and Sheppard, is sent to look for the crashed plane. At the camp, Ravin suggests eating the dead bodies, and many of the survivors except a few agree with him. Since one of the people who disagreed was the leader, the whole team decided not to eat the bodies.

The rescue team finds large footprints in the snow. At the camp, two survivors responsible for finding food return empty-handed, and Ravin sets out to cut up one of the bodies for food. The body he is about to cut up happens to be Kyra's brother, whom she loved very much and was very close to. She manages to stop him, and the survivors realize another body is missing and accuse Ravin of possibly hiding and eating it. The survivors decide they will eat one of the bodies if a rescue team does not arrive the next day.

After a day has passed, the survivors eat one of the bodies. Kyra, however, cannot stand the thought of eating one of the bodies and retreats into the plane. Later that night, she sets all of the bodies on fire, rendering them inedible. An enraged Ravin furiously accuses her of possibly killing them all and tries to turn everyone against her, but the others stick up for her, saying that she did the right thing, and decide to try and hike down the mountains the next morning. Garcia returns to the camp, but a terrified Ravin shoots him in the face with a flare gun. Looking for food, the Yeti attacks the survivors, killing Ashley and Dennis. They shoot the Yeti with the remaining flare gun, but it escapes with Sarah. As the rescue team arrives, they decide to try and get her back.

Sarah awakes next to two slumbering Yetis. The team digs a hole at one of the entrances to the cave, filling it with punji sticks, and Sarah finds them. However, the Yetis wake up and give chase. The group manages to get out of the cave, and the Yetis fall into the trap, trapping them. An avalanche ensues, sealing off the cave and killing one of the Yetis. After saying their goodbyes to the dead, the survivors hike for a while before setting up camp. One of the Yetis emerges from the avalanche and, though badly injured, pursues the survivors.

The next morning, the survivors start hiking again. Ravin stops to "urinate" and eat some chocolate he hid; the Yeti appears before him. The survivors run, but the Yeti catches Ravin, biting off one of his ears. Fury attempts to save him but accidentally shoots and kills him. The Yeti quickly kills her and Sheppard as the team runs off. Peyton tackles the Yeti, and they roll off a cliff, and though Peyton grabs hold of a tree branch, the Yeti holds on to his leg. The rest of the team rescues Peyton by spearing the Yeti, causing it to fall to its death, and a nearby helicopter spots the four survivors and rescues them. Garcia wakes up alone in the snow; however, a Yeti arm punches through the snow, and his eventual fate is left ambiguous.

== Cast ==
- Carly Pope as Sarah
- Marc Menard as Peyton Elway
- Elfina Luk as Kyra
- Brandon Jay McLaren as Rice
- Adam O'Byrne as James De Ravin
- Crystal Lowe as Ashley
- Christian Tessier as Dennis
- Kris Pope as Rafael Garcia
- Josh Emerson as Andrews
- Peter DeLuise as John Sheppard
- Ona Grauer as Fury
- Ed Marinaro as Coach Gorfida
- Aaron Pearl as H.W. Tilman
- Taras Kostyuk as Yeti

== Release ==
The film was broadcast on the Syfy Channel on November 8, 2008. The film was released on DVD January 13, 2009.

== Reception ==
Dread Central said, "A good beginning and a fun ending, but most of the film’s midsection just left me – dare I say it – cold."

== See also ==
- Merlin and The Book of Beasts
- Beyond Loch Ness
- Beowulf & Grendel
