= Kris Pope =

Canadian film and television actor (born 1976)

- Born: 25 May 1976 (age 50); Calgary, Alberta, Canada
- Occupation: Actor
- Years active: 1998–2009

Kris Pope (born 25 May 1976) is a Canadian film and television actor.

== Early life ==
He was born in Calgary, Alberta, and raised in Vancouver, British Columbia, with a younger sister Carly Pope – who became an actress – and a younger brother.

== Career ==
Pope has appeared in at least six films and also appeared in over a dozen television productions.

=== Film and television work ===
- Breaker High (one episode, "New Kids on the Deck"; 1998) as Cute Guy
- Shutterspeed (2000) (TV movie) as Mark Pearson
- Josie and the Pussycats (2001) as Gregor
- Dark Angel (three episodes, "Meow 01x20; 2001", "Radar Love 02x04" and "Boo 02x05"; 2002) as Rafer
- My Guide to Becoming a Rock Star (one episode, "Pilot"; 2002)
- Saint Sinner (2002) (TV movie) as Brother Rafael
- Snow Queen (2002) (TV movie) as Reginald Priceless
- House of the Dead (2003) as Raver
- John Doe (two episodes, "Tone Dead" and "Doe or Die"; 2003) as Funky Coroner's Assistant; Coroner's Assistant
- Smallville (one episode, "Visitor", 2003) as Todd
- Thanksgiving Family Reunion (2003) (TV movie) as Jock No. 2
- Going the Distance (2004) as Rowdy Guy
- Break a Leg, Rosie (2005)
- Killer Instinct (one episode, "Forget Me Not"; 2005)
- Bionic Woman (one episode, "Faceoff"; 2007) as Other Sexy Poker Guy
- Elegy (2008) as Consuela's Brother
- The L Word (two episodes, "Lacuna" (2005) and "Lifecycle", (2008)) as Emile; Cycling Dude No. 1
- Yeti: Curse of the Snow Demon (2008) (TV movie) as Rafael Garcia
- The Break-Up Artist (2009) as Pat

== Personal life ==
On 29 December 2009, Pope and his sister Carly were driving a black BMW vehicle down West Georgia Street in Downtown Vancouver when David Fromradas, age 31 of Alberta, jumped on top of the car and yelled at them to run him over. When Pope got out of the car, Fromradas jumped in the front seat and drove the vehicle into the new CBC studios. Pope suffered severe injuries to his ankle; his sister suffered a broken rib and two cracked vertebrae. The two, along with an unidentified victim, were treated at hospital; Fromradas was also treated in hospital and remained in police custody.
