= Carly Pope =

Canadian actress (born 1980)

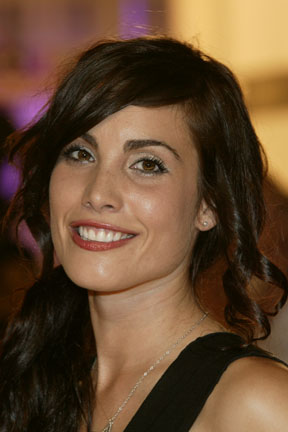
- Pope at the Toronto International Film Festival, September 7, 2007
- Born: August 28, 1980 (age 46); Vancouver, British Columbia, Canada
- Occupation: Actress
- Years active: 1996–present
- Spouse: David Lyons
- Children: 1

Carly Pope (born August 28, 1980) is a Canadian actress. She is best known for her roles on The WB's drama series Popular (1999–2001), supernatural drama series The Collector (2004–2005), USA Network's legal drama series Suits (2016–2017) and The CW's Arrow (2016–2017).

== Early life ==
Pope was born and raised in Vancouver, British Columbia, with an older brother, Kris, also an actor, and a younger brother, Alexander. She was trained as a dancer until she became active in theater during high school. She appeared in plays such as The Odd Couple, playing Mickey, and A Midsummer Night's Dream, playing Titania. She attended Lord Byng Secondary School.

== Career ==
Pope started her career with several small roles, such as Disturbing Behavior, Snow Day, Aliens in the Wild, Wild West, and Night Man, before being cast as Sam McPherson on The WB's comedy-drama television series Popular (1999–2001). The series followed two teenage girls, Pope and Leslie Bibb, who reside on opposite ends of the popularity spectrum at their high school, but are forced to get along when their single parents meet on a cruise ship and get married. Pope was named one of Teen People's 25 Hottest Stars Under 25 in 2000. She has appeared on the cover of several magazines, including Seventeen, Teen, Curve and Medusa, and in pictorials for FHM and Razor. Her breakthrough role was playing Abbey in Disturbing Behavior (1998), who was in a flashback sequence, but it was cut when the film was released.

Pope had several roles in film and television, including The Glass House, Jeff Probst's Finder's Fee, and Orange County. In 2004 she had starred as Maya Kandinski in The Collector. In 2005, she was a guest-star in an episode of FOX's Tru Calling and played an aspiring social worker in the film Eighteen.

In 2007, Pope starred in the Power Up project Itty Bitty Titty Committee, and in Martin Gero's "intelligent sex comedy" and Toronto International Film Festival hit, Young People Fucking. In 2009, she appeared in FOX's hit thriller, 24, as Samantha Roth, the president's son's girlfriend.

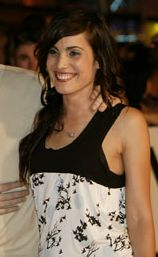
Pope at the 2007 Toronto International Film Festival party

Pope joined the main cast of the NBC legal drama television series Outlaw in 2010, portraying Lucinda Pearl. In 2015, Pope co-produced the Canadian documentary film Highway of Tears. She portrayed architect Tara Messer on USA Network's legal drama series Suits (2016–2017). On July 26, 2019, The Hollywood Reporter announced that Pope will appear in Hallmark Channel's Christmas-themed television film, Double Holiday (2019) opposite Kristoffer Polaha.

== Personal life ==
On December 29, 2009, Pope and her brother, Kris, were driving a black BMW down West Georgia Street in Downtown Vancouver when David Fomradas, 31, of Alberta jumped on top of the car and yelled at them to run him over. When Kris got out of the car, Fomradas jumped in the front seat and drove the vehicle into the new CBC studios. Carly suffered a broken rib and two cracked vertebrae, Kris suffered severe injuries to his ankle, and a passerby was also injured. Fromradas was also treated in hospital and remained in police custody.

Pope started dating Australian actor David Lyons around 2014 according to her Instagram and they have been married for several years. In November 2024, Pope gave birth to their child.

== Filmography ==
=== Film ===
Year	Title	Role	Notes
1996	A Girl's Guide to Kissing and Other Nightmares in Teenland		Short film
1998	Disturbing Behavior	Abbey	
1999	Aliens in the Wild, Wild West	Sara Johnson	Direct-to-video
2000	Snow Day	Fawn	
2001	Finder's Fee	Carla	
2001	The Glass House	Tasha	
2002	Orange County	Tanya	
2002	Various Positions	Cheryth Bleyn	
2003	Nemesis Game	Sara Novak	
2003	This Time Around	Melissa Rochester	
2004	Whitecoats	Sarah Calder	
2004	Everyone	Rena	
2005	Window Theory	Angela	
2005	Sandra Gets Dumped	Sandra	Short film
2005	The Hamster Cage	Candy	
2005	The French Guy	Anna	
2005	Eighteen	Jenny	
2005	Two for the Money	Tammy	
2005	Break a Leg, Rosie	Rosie	Short film
2005	Sandra Goes to Whistler	Sandra	Short film
2007	Itty Bitty Titty Committee	Shulamith	
2007	Beneath	Vanessa	
2007	Young People Fucking	Kris	
2008	Say Goodnight	Crystal	
2008	Edison and Leo	Zella (voice)	
2008	Toronto Stories	Roshanna	
2009	Life Is Hot in Cracktown	Stacy	
2009	Stuntmen	Karla Bravo	
2011	S.W.A.T.: Firefight	Kim Byers	Direct-to-video
2011	Textuality	Simone	
2012	Man and Woman	Amy	Short film
2012	Concrete Blondes	Kris Connifer	
2013	Elysium	CCB Agent	
2013	This Last Lonely Place	Faye Gardner	
2013	Ambushed	Beverly	
2017	Rakka	Sarah	Short film
2020	The Lost Husband	Lanie	
2021	Demonic	Carly	
2022	Easter Sunday	Catherine	
2023	The Mental State	Angela Cady	

=== Television ===
Year	Title	Role	Notes
1998	Principal Takes a Holiday	Student	TV film
1998	I've Been Waiting for You	Cheerleader	TV film
1998	Night Man	Teresa Chase	Episode: "Manimal"
1999	Our Guys: Outrage at Glen Ridge	Mari Ferraez	TV film
1999	A Cooler Climate	Beth	TV film
1999–2001	Popular	Sam McPherson	Main cast
2000	Trapped in a Purple Haze	Molly White	TV film
2002–2003	Kim Possible	Amelia (voice)	2 episodes
2003	First to Die	Cindy Thomas	TV film
2003	Hemingway: That Summer in Paris	Young Loreto Callaghan	TV film
2003	This Time Around	Melissa 'Mel' Rochester	TV film
2003	Jake 2.0	Rachel / Yori	Episode: "The God, the Bad, and the Geeky"
2003	A Tale of Two Wives	Bianca	TV film
2004	The Ranch	Beth Ann	TV film
2004	The Mountain	Ronnie	Episode: "The Letter"
2004–2005	The Collector	Maya Kandinski	Main cast (season 1)
2005	Young Blades	The Enchantress	Episode: "Enchanted"
2005	Tru Calling	Off. Kate Wilson	Episode: "The Perfect Storm"
2005	Recipe for a Perfect Christmas	J.J. Jenner	TV film
2006	10.5: Apocalypse	Laura Malloy	TV film
2006	The Evidence		Episode: "Stringers"
2007	Dirt	Garbo	Recurring role
2007	The 4400	Kara	Episode: "Till We Have Built Jerusalem"
2007	Whistler	Bailey	2 episodes
2008	Robson Arms	Anke Vermeulen-Papathanasiou	Episode: "Cherchez la Femme"
2008	Yeti: Curse of the Snow Demon	Sarah	TV film
2008	24: Redemption	Samantha Roth	TV film
2008	Californication	Annika	2 episodes
2009	24	Samantha Roth	Recurring role
2010	Day One	Bonnie	TV pilot
2010	Outlaw	Lucinda Pearl	Main cast
2013	Motive	Sonia	Episode: "Ruthless"
2013	The Tomorrow People	Morgan Burke	2 episodes
2014	Republic of Doyle	Alisha Maracle	5 episodes
2014	Rush	Beverly	Episode: "You Spin Me Around"
2016–2017	Suits	Tara Messer	Recurring role (season 6)
2016–2017	Arrow	Susan Williams	Recurring role
2018	Blindspot	Quinn Bonita	Episode: "Deductions"
2018	I Killed My BFF: The Preacher's Daughter	Rae	TV film
2019	Double Holiday	Rebecca Hoffman	TV movie
2020	The Good Doctor	Lily Cross	2 episodes
2022–2024	Pretty Little Liars	Davie Adams	Recurring role
2022	Quantum Leap	Samantha Stratton	Episode: "Atlantis"

== Awards and nominations ==
Year	Award	Category	Production	Result	Refs
2000	Teen Choice Awards	TV – Choice Actress	Popular	Nominated	
2004	Leo Awards	Dramatic Series: Best Supporting Performance by a Female	The Collector	Won	
2005	Vancouver International Film Festival	Women in Film Award	The Hamster Cage	Won	
2006	Leo Awards	Best Performance by a Female in a Short Drama	Sandra Gets Dumped	Won	
2009	Canadian Comedy Awards	Best Performance by a Female – Film	Young People Fucking	Nominated	
