= Aliens in the Wild, Wild West =

1999 film

- Film poster
- Directed by: George Erschbamer
- Written by: Alon Kaplan
- Produced by: Cris Andrei; Gabi Antal; Michael J. Mahoney
- Starring: Taylor Locke; Carly Pope
- Cinematography: Calin Ghibu
- Edited by: Paul Winestock
- Music by: Orest Hrynewich; Jack Lenz; Stephen Skratt
- Distributed by: Full Moon Entertainment; Kushner-Locke Company
- Release date: August 17, 1999 (U.S.)
- Running time: 90 minutes
- Countries: Canada; Romania
- Language: English

Aliens in the Wild, Wild West is a 1999 science fiction film directed by George Erschbamer and written by Alon Kaplan.

== Plot ==
Aliens in the Wild, Wild West takes place in a mid-19th century western town which had been traveled to by two modern day siblings through the means of time travel.

The younger sibling, Tom Johnson (Locke), was an annoyance to his older sister Sara (Pope). They fought all the time, which is what got them put into the town. While back in time, Tom finds an alien spaceship in the forest. He soon finds out that oxygen is poisonous to the cute and fuzzy aliens, and they only breathe sulfur. The cute and fuzzy aliens resemble a cross between E.T. and a hairy Yoda. The voice of the youngest alien highly resembles Elmo. When the townsmen find the aliens, they try to sell them to a representative of P.T. Barnum. Tom and Sara see that this is immoral and try to save the alien by getting it back to the ship. The moral shift appears to be out of character for Sara since we were first introduced to her after she was caught joy riding in a stolen car with her punk rocker convict boyfriend.

After the two siblings are successful in their moral crusade, they are transported back into the modern day ghost town from whence they came. Tom and Sara's sour relationship heals as they drive back to their suburban home.

== Cast ==
- Taylor Locke as Tom Johnson
- Carly Pope as Sara Johnson
- Barna Moricz as Johnny Coyle
- Markus Parilo as Sheriff Cane
- Gerry Quigley as Bob "Bloody Bob"
- Gloria Slade as Elizabeth
- George Ilie as Jiffyvawa "Jiffy" Zudo
- Ovidiu Bucurenciu as Jiffy's Mom
- Marcel Cobzariu as Pook (credited as Marcello Cobzariu)
- Marius Florea Vizante as Ben Small (credited as Marius Florea)
- Marioara Sterian as Melinda
- Mircea Constantinescu as Roger
- Sandu Mihai Gruia as Mac (credited as Mihai Sandu Gruia)
- Liviu Timus as Eustace
- Constantine Barbulescu as Clemmy
- Serban Celea as The Bartender
- Ion Haiduc as Prophet
- Silvia Nastase as Woman
