= Hush (2005 film) =

2005 American television film

- Promotional poster
- Written by: Julie Ferber Frank; Steven Frank
- Directed by: Harvey Kahn
- Starring: Tori Spelling; Victoria Pratt; Tahmoh Penikett
- Country of origin: United States
- Original language: English

Production
- Running time: 90 minutes

Original release
- Network: Lifetime
- Release: May 23, 2005

Hush is a 2005 television film that stars Tori Spelling and Tahmoh Penikett as a married couple, who move back to his hometown to work as a doctor, and are desperate to have a baby. Victoria Pratt also stars as the doctor's former high school girlfriend who will do anything to win him back including having his child. The film premiered on Lifetime channel on May 23, 2005.

== Plot ==
Nina Hamilton is a happily married children's book author and illustrator, who along with her doctor husband Noah have been trying several times to have a baby, when they suddenly move back to Noah's hometown. When they move back they agree to try another round of in vitro fertilization. Nina meets a waitress, named Callie, the two quickly become friends, although Nina does not know the extent of Callie's background with Noah. The two were dating in high school and Noah performed an abortion on her when she got pregnant with their baby. One day Nina's beloved cat Tess is found dead and Nina is devastated. Nina and Noah go in for another unsuccessful round of in-vitro, and is distraught that she cannot get pregnant, and is told there are only two embryos left and set another appointment. Callie, becoming increasingly obsessive of Noah, goes in for the procedure and learns, while she is with Nina, that she is pregnant. Although happy for Callie, Nina is unaware that Callie is carrying her child with Noah and is saddened that she is not pregnant. Nina and Callie go shopping for the baby, where Nina tells her she can do more with her life and should look into other career paths such as real estate. Callie agrees and asks a female real estate agent if she can apply. The woman, having a low opinion of Callie, rudely dismisses her. Callie comes back later and kills her. Nina starts becoming suspicious of Callie's pregnancy when she learns the father is married and starts after going in for her final in vitro procedure and learns that the embryos were implanted already.

Distraught and angry, Nina suspects that Callie did it after learning of her past with Noah. Noah tells her they cannot just go out and accuse her without evidence. Nina goes over to Callie's apartment when she is off to work and finds pictures of Noah, a blond wig similar to Nina's hair color. Nina decides that she must keep Callie close, so she burns down her apartment and then invites her to stay with herself and Noah. Nina's mother stops in for a visit and instantly likes Callie, despite her suspicion after being told by Nina of her distrust for Callie. Callie and Nina's mother talk of food cravings and she inadvertently tells Callie of her allergy to peanuts. Callie bakes a cake mixed with peanut oil and offers a piece to Nina's mother, who starts to asphyxiate. Callie withholds her medicine and watches her die. Nina confronts Callie and leaves to make arrangements for her mother's funeral while Noah stays with Callie, who starts flirting with him openly. Nina returns home and sees Callie making passes and the two argue. Callie goes into labor and they all rush to the hospital, where Callie gives birth to a girl.

Once they return home, Nina sees Callie packing up her things, ordering her out. Callie tells her that Nina has no place in this family, as Callie has done the one thing Nina could not; give Noah a baby, and threatens her with a knife. Noah returns and Callie tries to convince him that they should be a family as the child is his. She instructs Noah to kill Nina with a fireplace poker and he agrees. He walks with Nina into the other room where he pretends to kill Nina. Callie tells him he made the right choice, and stabs him, knowing he was lying and goes upstairs in attempt to kill the child, knowing it will hurt them both. They both hear the baby crying and Nina tries to rush up for her before Callie does. They both struggle and fall down the stairs. Nina gets up and sees that Callie was stabbed by the knife, and rushes up to get the baby and walks past Callie who sees them reunite with Noah and then dies.

== Cast ==
- Tori Spelling as Nina Hamilton
- Victoria Pratt as Callie
- Tahmoh Penikett as Dr. Noah Hamilton
- Susan Hogan as Florence
- Gabrielle Rose as Dell Carter
- Hiro Kanagawa as Dr. Berke
- Tom Shorthouse as Dr. Camp
- John Shaw as Dr. Mirvis
- James Bearden as Merle Hines
- Ken Roberts as Bill Yett
- Dustin Milligan as Billy
- Michael St. John Smith as Jared McLeod
- Namaiya Cunnigham as Nina and Noah's daughter
