= Merlin: The Quest Begins =

- Written by: Tom Richards; Christopher A. Roosen
- Directed by: David Winning
- Starring: Jason Connery; Deborah Moore; Gareth Thomas; Graham McTavish
- Country of origin: United States
- Original language: English

Production
- Producer: Damian Lee
- Cinematography: Al Anderson
- Editor: Chris Gormlie
- Running time: 89 minutes

Original release
- Release: October 19, 1998

Merlin: The Quest Begins is a 1998 TV movie created by Eamonn Maguire about a young Merlin (Jason Connery) who must rescue helpless people from the evil King Vidus and his ruthless high counselor.

== Cast ==
- Jason Connery as Young Merlin
- Deborah Moore as Nimue
- Gareth Thomas as Blaze
- Graham McTavish as Rengal
- Paul Curran as Kay
- Corey Haim as Wilf

== Production ==
Merlin: The Quest Begins was created by Eamonn Maguire and was filmed in 16 days in September 1997 near Peebles, Scotland.
