= House of the Dead (film) =

2003 film by Uwe Boll

- Theatrical release poster
- Directed by: Uwe Boll
- Screenplay by: Dave Parker; Mark A. Altman
- Story by: Mark A. Altman; Dan Bates
- Based on: The House of the Dead by Sega
- Produced by: Uwe Boll; Wolfgang Herold; Shawn Williamson
- Starring: Jonathan Cherry; Tyron Leitso; Clint Howard; Ona Grauer; Ellie Cornell; Jürgen Prochnow
- Cinematography: Matias Neumann
- Edited by: David Richardson
- Music by: Reinhard Besser
- Production companies: Boll KG Productions; Mindfire Entertainment; Herold & Besser Studios; Brightlight Pictures
- Distributed by: Artisan Entertainment (United States); Alliance Atlantis (Canada)
- Release dates: February 15, 2003 (San Francisco); October 10, 2003 (United States)
- Running time: 90 minutes
- Countries: Canada; Germany; United States
- Language: English
- Budget: $12 million
- Box office: $13.8 million

House of the Dead is a 2003 action horror film directed by Uwe Boll, from a screenplay by Dave Parker and Mark A. Altman. Based on The House of the Dead video game franchise, it stars Jonathan Cherry, Tyron Leitso, Clint Howard, Ona Grauer, Ellie Cornell, and Jürgen Prochnow. The film takes place on a fictional island infested by zombies, forcing survivors to fight their way off. Not a direct adaptation of the individual entries, Boll described the film as a prequel to the original 1997 game. House of the Dead was Boll's first film to be released theatrically, in addition to his first video game adaptation.

Upon release, House of the Dead was universally panned by critics and audiences alike, giving Boll a negative reputation that would continue throughout his career. Commercially, the film grossed $13.8 million on a $12 million budget. A direct-to-video sequel was released in 2005, with only Cornell returning. House of the Dead was the last film released by Artisan Entertainment, which merged into Lionsgate on December 15, 2003.

== Plot ==
After booking a boat trip to attend a rave on an island located off the coast of Seattle named "Isla del Morte" ("Island of Death"), two college students, Simon and Greg meet up with three girls: Alicia, Karma, and Greg's girlfriend Cynthia. The five arrive to the dock late and the boat that is supposed to take them to Isla del Morte has already left. Victor Kirk, a boat captain, and his first mate Salish agree to ferry them despite knowing the location when they are offered a huge sum of money to leave fast rather than be inspected.

Arriving at Isla del Morte, they find the rave site ransacked and deserted. Alicia, Karma and Simon leave the site to go find anybody around while Cynthia and Greg stay behind. As Greg and Cynthia are about to engage in sex in a tent, the former leaves to urinate. Alone in the tent, Cynthia is killed by a group of zombies. Meanwhile, Alicia, Karma and Simon find a derelict house and as they attempt to investigate the place, they discover Alicia's ex-boyfriend Rudy, Hugh, and rave dancer Liberty, who inform them of a zombie attack during the event. The six leave the house to fetch Greg and Cynthia. Meanwhile, the zombies kill Salish when he is alone in the forest.

Alicia, Rudy, Karma, Simon, Liberty and Hugh return to the rave site where they find Greg. A zombified Cynthia comes out from behind a tree and kills Hugh but is killed when Casper, a Coast Guard officer who was tracking Kirk, arrives and shoots her. They form a plan to return to Kirk's boat and leave the island. When they return to the beach they find zombies on Kirk's boat. Casper and Greg leave the group to go find help, but Greg is killed in the forest.

Kirk reveals the island's history; Isla del Morte was home to Castillo Sermano, a Spanish Catholic priest who was banished from Spain in the 15th century for his dark experiments, which the Catholic Church forbade. Castillo murdered the crew of St. Cristobal, the ship that was taking him to the island, enslaved the island's natives, and murdered anyone who visited the place. He then created an immortality serum which he injected himself with, allowing him to live forever and return dead souls to life and support his cause. Kirk leads the group to a spot in the forest where he has hidden a box full of guns and weaponry. Once everyone is armed, they decide to head back to the house only to find the courtyard filled with zombies. Liberty and Casper are killed in the ensuing fight and Alicia, Rudy, Kirk, Karma and Simon manage to take shelter inside the house.

When Kirk is alone, he hears Salish whistling outside. He goes outside and sees Salish now zombified. Kirk sacrifices himself by killing Salish and a bunch of zombies with a stick of dynamite, but the explosion also blows up the entrance to the house. The remaining four lock themselves in a lab inside the house, but the zombies break in. Karma finds a hatch in the floor which she, Alicia and Rudy use to escape. Simon sacrifices himself to kill the zombies by shooting a barrel of gunpowder, blowing up the house and the zombies. Alicia, Rudy and Karma find themselves in tunnels. They make their way through the tunnels, but Karma is killed by zombies as she attempts to hold them off as Rudy and Alicia flee.

Alicia and Rudy are aided out of the tunnels by a mysterious man wearing Greg's face as a mask. The man is revealed to be Castillo Sermano, who then orders a horde of zombies to restrain Alicia and Rudy in an attempt to kill them and use their flesh for his own purposes. Alicia and Rudy escape Castillo, blowing the tunnels up in the process. Castillo manages to survive the explosion and Alicia gets into a sword fight with him. Castillo impales her heart, and Rudy manages to decapitate him soon after. However, the still-alive headless body of Castillo begins to strangle Rudy. Alicia, who is barely alive, gets up and crushes the head under her foot, which finally kills him. Although Alicia seemingly dies, she and Rudy are rescued by a team of agents. When the agents ask Rudy to identify himself, he reveals his last name is Curien. The ending narration reveals that Rudy gave Alicia the immortality serum, and they return to Seattle.

== Cast ==
- Jonathan Cherry as Rudolph "Rudy" Curien (Note: Rudy Curien does not appear in the video games, as he was an original character created specifically for this film. It is loosely based on Daniel Curien in The House of the Dead III, who is the son of the antagonist Roy Curien.)
- Ona Grauer as Alicia
- Tyron Leitso as Simon
- Enuka Okuma as Karma
- Will Sanderson as Greg
- Sonya Salomaa as Cynthia
- Michael Eklund as Hugh
- Kira Clavell as Liberty
- David Palffy as Castillo Sermano
- Ellie Cornell as Jordan Casper
- Jürgen Prochnow as Victor Kirk
- Clint Howard as Salish

Adam J. Harrington and Colin Lawrence portray Thomas Rogan and G, the protagonists of the first game. Matt and Johanna, the first victims of the zombie attack, are played by Steve Byers and Erica Durance. Jay Brazeau, Bif Naked, and Kris Pope appear as a captain, DJ, and raver, respectively. Elisabeth Rosen, who appeared in director Uwe Boll's previous film Heart of America, plays Skye. Sega of America President Peter Moore and House of the Dead game producer Rikiya Nakagawa make uncredited cameos as zombies.

== Production ==
A feature film based on the video game The House of the Dead had first been in development in 1998 at DreamWorks Pictures, with Jesse Dylan directing and Mark Verheiden writing the screenplay. The story would have been a loose adaptation of the game, in which a group of zombies are the most popular kids in college and a group of nerds must defeat them. In October 2000, it was reported Mindfire Entertainment had acquired the rights to House of the Dead with Dave Parker and Mark A. Altman set to write the script featuring a young cast in order to capture a similar appeal to Scream (1996). In May 2002, it was announced Boll KG had come on board the film with Uwe Boll set to direct. Filming began that same month with representatives from Sega shooting alongside the production to secure images, motion capture, and gather other materials for The House of the Dead 4.

== Music ==
=== Soundtrack ===
House of the Dead: Original Motion Picture Soundtrack

Soundtrack album by Various artists
- Released: November 11, 2003
- Genres: Neue Deutsche Härte; industrial metal; groove metal; nu metal
- Length: 48:34
- Label: ZYX

The film's soundtrack was released in late 2003 through ZYX Records. The album featured many bands from Boll's home country of Germany.

Track listing

No.	Title	Artist	Length
1.	"House of the Dead"	Razorburner	3:13
2.	"Raveline"	Okyo	2:32
3.	"Sly Dog"	Perfect Fred	3:58
4.	"Kingdom Come"	N.O.P.E.	4:00
5.	"Cry"	Cassideena	4:01
6.	"Whenever I Fall"	Rat's Back	5:42
7.	"Bitter Tears"	N.O.P.E.	3:24
8.	"Jordan"	Megaherz	3:38
9.	"Suicide Serenade"	Misery Inc.	4:00
10.	"Angst"	Eisbrecher	4:15
11.	"This Is Real" (Club Mix)	Rey Thomas	6:41
12.	"This Is Real" (Radio Mix)	Rey Thomas	3:10
Total length:			48:34

=== Music video ===
A music video for the song "This Is Real" by Swiss pop singer Rey Thomas was also released as part of the publicity campaign. The clip was shot on location on the original set, parallel to the shooting of the movie, and shows the artist, who is himself made up as a zombie, in the midst of a group of dancing zombies from the film. This parody-like part was contrasted in a parallel montage of numerous, extremely violent scenes featuring the original cast, which caused many broadcasters to refuse to play the clip in heavy rotation.

Songs that are not included on the soundtrack album

- "Fury (House of the Dead)" by Black Tiger
- "Danger", "Zombie Island" and "Abu Dhabi" by Codetrasher
- "The Rotten Smell" by The Horror Boogies

=== Score ===
House of the Dead: The Classical Score

Soundtrack album by Reinhard Besser
- Released: March 29, 2013
- Genre: Film score
- Length: 34:24
- Label: Playground Worldwide

The film's score was composed by German composer Reinhard Besser. Besser would later compose the score for another Boll film in 2005 with Alone in the Dark. The score was released on March 29, 2013, through Playground Worldwide.

Track listing

All tracks are written by Reinhard Besser.

No.	Title	Length
1.	"Opener"	2:51
2.	"Ominous Sea"	2:17
3.	"The Island"	2:21
4.	"Haunted House"	2:48
5.	"Dungeon"	3:16
6.	"Alchemist at Work"	2:05
7.	"Flesh"	3:02
8.	"The Fight"	3:02
9.	"Main Theme"	3:37
10.	"Romantic Theme"	4:07
11.	"End Theme"	4:58
Total length:		34:24

== Release ==
House of the Dead was shown at the San Diego Independent Film Festival on February 15, 2003.

House of the Dead was released theatrically in the United States on October 10, 2003.

=== Home media ===
House of the Dead was released on DVD on January 27, 2004, by Artisan Entertainment.

A director's cut of the film was released on DVD on September 9, 2008, distributed by Lionsgate Home Entertainment. This version features new dialogue, alternative takes, pop-up commentary and animation from the original video game.

== Reception ==
=== Box office ===
House of the Dead grossed $10.2 million in the United States and Canada, and $3.6 million in other countries, for a total gross of $13.8 million, against its budget of $12 million.

In its opening weekend the film grossed $5.7 million, finishing sixth at the box office.

The film earned $40 million in DVD sales.

=== Critical response ===
On the review aggregator website Rotten Tomatoes, 3% of 59 critics' reviews are positive, with an average rating of 2.5/10. The website's consensus reads: "A grungy, disjointed, mostly brainless mess of a film, House of the Dead is nonetheless loaded with unintentional laughs." Metacritic, which uses a weighted average, assigned the film a score of 15 out of 100, based on 15 critics, indicating "overwhelming dislike". Audiences polled by CinemaScore gave the film a rare average grade of "F" on an A+ to F scale. In 2009, Time listed the film on their list of top ten worst video game movies of all time.

IGN gave it three out of five stars, citing it as "an unabashed B-movie that does an incredibly decent job with a limited budget, unknown cast, and routine storyline".

Dennis Harvey of Variety wrote in his review: "Hyperactive lensing and editing, lurid coloration, soundtrack of surprisingly conventional orchestrations and intermittent rap-rock bombast all do their intended bits. Overall package is glossy-professional, with no subtlety achieved or desired."

Jamie Russell of BBC News Online wrote in his review: "Just when it looked like zombies were cool again, this truly pointless adaptation of the plot-lite House Of The Dead videogame threatens to send them back to the undertakers."

== Adaptations ==
=== Sequel ===
A sequel to the film, titled House of the Dead 2, was first shown at the Sitges Film Festival in Spain on October 14, 2005. It premiered on Sci Fi on February 11, 2006. Cornell was the only actor from the first film to star in the sequel.

=== Reboot ===
In October 2024, it was announced that Paul W. S. Anderson would write and direct a new film based on The House of the Dead. In February 2026, it was reported that Isabela Merced had signed on to lead the film adaptation with Sega stating the film was a top priority in the wake of the success of their Sonic the Hedgehog films.

=== Related film and cancelled sequel ===
A related film titled Dead and Deader was released in December 2006 on Syfy directed by Patrick Dinhut and starring Dean Cain, which was originally planned and titled as House of the Dead 3, but later dropped due to licensing issues. In December 2025, it was revealed that Uwe Boll had plans to make an unofficial sequel to his original 2003 film titled 23 Years Later: The Castle of the Dead, with the intent of also reuniting the original cast. In May 2026, Jonathan Cherry and Ona Grauer were announced to appear in the film, but with new characters. In July 2026, Boll confirmed the project has been cancelled, due to working on the sequel to his film Citizen Vigilante (2026).

== See also ==
- List of films based on video games
