= Far Cry (film) =

2008 film by Uwe Boll

- German-language poster
- Directed by: Uwe Boll
- Written by: Michael Roesch; Peter Scheerer; Masaji Takei
- Based on: Far Cry by Crytek & Ubisoft
- Produced by: Uwe Boll; Dan Clarke; Wolfgang Herold; Shawn Williamson
- Starring: Til Schweiger; Emmanuelle Vaugier; Udo Kier; Natalia Avelon; Craig Fairbrass; Michael Paré; Ralf Möller
- Cinematography: Mathias Neumann
- Edited by: Karen Porter
- Music by: Jessica de Rooij
- Production companies: Boll KG Productions; Brightlight Pictures
- Distributed by: 20th Century Fox
- Release date: 2 October 2008 (Germany)
- Running time: 95 minutes
- Countries: Germany; Canada
- Language: English
- Budget: $30 million
- Box office: $743,634

Far Cry is a 2008 English-language German action film loosely adapted from the video game of the same name. The film is directed by Uwe Boll and stars Til Schweiger. It was a major box-office bomb and received negative reviews.

== Plot ==
On a remote island off the North American coast, a mercenary squad is attacked and slaughtered by a lone aggressor during a nighttime operation. The encounter is a result of the efforts of a scientist named Dr. Krieger to turn soldiers into mutants who boast superstrength and resilience, but are uncontrollable. Valerie Cardinal, an American journalist, is secretly receiving information about Krieger's research. She agrees to meet with her informant on Krieger's island and hires Jack Carver, a retired special forces operative now working as a tour skipper, to take her there. During the trip she reveals to Jack that her informant is her uncle Max, who she claims served with Jack. However, Jack denies having known him.

Jack's boat reaches the island, and Valerie and Jack travel to the meeting point. However, Max was caught by Krieger's sadistic second-in-command, Katia Chenov, and turned into a mutant. Krieger's mercenaries ambush Jack and Valerie. Valerie is captured and the boat is destroyed, but Jack escapes and rescues Valerie. He insists that they leave the island, but Valerie refuses to leave without Max.

The pair hijack a mercenary vehicle and proceed to their main compound, where they are captured once again. Jack is locked into an empty cell with Emilio, a grocery deliverer who got caught up in the chase. While they attempt to escape, Valerie is forced to dine with Krieger, who orders the mercenaries to unleash Max on Jack and Emilio. After a brief fight, Jack manages to convince Max to reject Krieger's programming. Max then assaults the mercenaries and releases the other mutants.

The mutants, enraged by what Krieger did to them, attempt to kill all the humans on the island. After taking heavy casualties, half of the surviving mercenaries realize Krieger is insane, abandon him and team up with Jack to escape the island. The other mercenaries remain loyal to Krieger and attempt to help him regain control. The two sides fight each other and the mutants at the same time. As the battle goes on, the mercenaries are quickly overwhelmed and slaughtered by the mutants.

While Krieger moves to flee the island with Valerie and Katia, Jack tries to take Krieger hostage for Valerie's release, but is injured. Max arrives, and seeing Valerie threatened by Katia, he attacks her. Katia fatally shoots him, but Max musters enough strength to kill her before expiring. Jack and Valerie are picked up by Emilio in Krieger's boat. When Krieger arrives at the docks, he finds himself stranded and left helpless before the approaching mutants.

The film ends with Jack in a relationship with Valerie, having obtained a new boat so he can continue to work as a skipper, and Emilio has been hired to be part of his crew. Valerie turns out to be an undercover CIA agent, and continues her work for the agency while traveling with Jack.

== Cast ==
- Til Schweiger as Jack Carver
- Emmanuelle Vaugier as Valerie Cardinal
- Udo Kier as Dr. Lucas Krieger
- Natalia Avelon as Katia Chernov
- Craig Fairbrass as Jason Parker
- Michael Paré as Paul Summers
- Ralf Möller as Max Cardinal
- Chris Coppola as Emilio
- Mike Dopud as Leader
- Don S. Davis as General Roderick
- Jay Brazeau as Ralph
- Michael Rogers as Mercenary Kelly
- Anthony Bourdain as Scientist
- Tyron Leitso as Operation Scientist

== Production ==
Uwe Boll gained the rights to a Far Cry movie from Crytek, purportedly before the game was released. In an October 2006 interview, Uwe Boll said that production on Far Cry would begin in May 2007. The film was released in German theaters on 2 October 2008.

== Reception ==
Far Cry received negative reviews, with most critics saying that the film does no justice to the game on which it was based. IGN gave it a 3 out of 10 and said "Perhaps one day game companies will learn to be more particular about the directors they choose to realize their products on the big screen. Fans of the game, and fans of movies in general, would be wise to avoid this one at all costs. Unless, of course, your purpose is to mock."

== Reboot ==
In 2013, Variety reported that Ubisoft was developing another Far Cry film (based on the video game Far Cry 3) along with a Watch Dogs and Raving Rabbids film, this time produced by Ubisoft Motion Pictures. However, it was instead adapted into an animated Netflix series, Captain Laserhawk: A Blood Dragon Remix, which was released in 2023 to generally favourable reviews.

== See also ==
- List of films based on video games
