= Day Break =

Television program

- Genre: Action; Thriller; Crime drama Fantasy
- Created by: Paul Zbyszewski
- Starring: Taye Diggs; Moon Bloodgood; Victoria Pratt; Meta Golding; Ramón Rodríguez; Adam Baldwin
- Theme music composer: Mark Kilian; Christophe Beck
- Country of origin: United States
- Original language: English
- No. of seasons: 1
- No. of episodes: 13 (7 unaired)

Production
- Executive producers: Jeffrey Jackson Bell; Rob Bowman; Paul Zbyszewski
- Producers: Taye Diggs; Abe Hoch
- Editors: Marta Evry; Alan Cody; Geofrey Hildrew
- Running time: 40 minutes
- Production companies: Matthew Gross Entertainment; Touchstone Television (2006); ABC Studios (2008)

Original release
- Network: ABC
- Release: November 15 – December 13, 2006
- Network: TV One
- Release: April 20 – June 8, 2008

Day Break is an American crime drama television series for which one 13-episode season was produced. The series starred Taye Diggs as Detective Brett Hopper, who is framed for the murder of Assistant District Attorney Alberto Garza. Due to a time loop, Hopper lives the same day over and over. The series revolves around his attempt to solve the mystery of the murder and find out who is behind the conspiracy to frame him.

The series aired on the ABC network and premiered on November 15, 2006. It was cancelled on December 15 after only six episodes had aired. The remaining episodes were subsequently made available online at ABC.com. Viewers for the show averaged 6.5 million.

On March 16, 2008, the TV One cable network began airing the six previously broadcast episodes. On April 20, the network began Sunday evening broadcasts of the remaining seven episodes, which had never been seen on television.

== Synopsis ==
LAPD Detective Brett Hopper is inexplicably repeating the same day, on which he is framed for the murder of the Assistant District Attorney, Alberto Garza. Hopper attempts to clear his name and uncover the truth, in the process discovering a conspiracy with ties to those close to him. He also struggles to understand what is happening to him, and learns that at least one other person may be repeating the same day. With every reset of the loop, Hopper wakes at his girlfriend Rita's home as the clock turns from 6:17 to 6:18 a.m. He retains his memories, as well as any injuries. Anyone outside of the loop has no awareness or memory of the repeating day, nor do they retain injuries from previous iterations. However, after Hopper experiences profound changes in his relationships with his partner Andrea and with Rita, respectively, their behaviors are altered going forward in the loop.

== Cast and characters ==
=== Main characters ===
- Brett Hopper, played by Taye Diggs, the main character of the show. He is a detective who is framed for the murder of Assistant District Attorney Alberto Garza.
- Rita Shelten, played by Moon Bloodgood, Brett's girlfriend. She is a nurse and is targeted by those who are framing Brett.
- Jennifer Mathis, played by Meta Golding, Brett's sister. She is a school teacher.
- Andrea Battle, played by Victoria Pratt, Brett's current partner. She is also a detective and is being investigated by Internal Affairs because of some shady dealings with her informer "Slim". She is romantically involved with Eddie Reyes, a former cop with a drug addiction.
- Damien Ortiz, played by Ramón Rodríguez, Brett's informant. He is a gang member who decided to turn against his gang. His safe house was ambushed the night before the repeating day, but he escaped.
- Chad Shelten, played by Adam Baldwin, Brett's former partner. He is now a detective in Internal Affairs. He is also Rita's ex-husband.

=== Supporting characters ===
Actor	Character	Role
Mitch Pileggi	Armen D. Spivak	Detective, robbery/homicide
Ian Anthony Dale	Christopher Choi	Detective, robbery/homicide
Joe Nieves	Fencik	"Shadow Agent"
Michael McGrady	Buchalter	"Shadow Agent"
Jim Beaver	Nick Vukovic	Retired cop, former partner of Brett's father
Don Franklin	Randall Mathis	School principal, Jennifer's husband
Michael B. Silver	Nathan Baxter	U.S. Attorney
Bahar Soomekh	Margot Clarke	Coffee shop/bus Woman/Judge Nitzberg's secretary
Jonathan Banks	Conrad Detweiler	"Shadow Man"
Nestor Carbonell	Eddie Reyes	Andrea's lover, former cop
John Getz	Tobias Booth	City Councilman
Raymond Cruz	Luis Torres	Booth's righthand man, former criminal
Eric Steinberg	Danny Yan/"Slim"	Drug dealer
John Rubinstein	Barry Colburn	Defense attorney
Clayton Rohner	Jared Pryor	Man who appears to be experiencing the time loop
Marlene Forte (as Marlene Forté)	Mrs. Garza	Alberto Garza's widow

== Episodes ==
No.	Title	Directed by	Written by	Original release date	Viewers (millions)
1	"Pilot"	Rob Bowman	Paul Zbyszewski	November 15, 2006	10.16
Detective Brett Hopper wakes up at his girlfriend, Rita Shelten's place. He saves a woman from getting hit by a bus, but when he returns to his own apartment, police break in, and arrest him for the murder of Assistant District Attorney, Alberto Garza. Shadowy figures break him out of jail, and tell him to confess, and show him Rita getting killed. He wakes up, only to find Rita alive, and he gets to relive the same day. (10.6 million viewers)
2	"What If They Run"	Rob Bowman	Paul Zbyszewski	November 15, 2006	10.16
Brett makes the decision to take Rita and try to make a run for it by getting out of town, in an attempt to escape the day. But he soon discovers the disastrous consequences of his rash actions on others. (8.6 million viewers)
3	"What If He Lets Her Go"	Rob Bowman	Steven Maeda	November 22, 2006	5.10
Hopper learns someone close to him may have been involved in framing him for Garza's murder. Meanwhile, some critical clues are revealed that could assist Hopper in making his nightmarish day finally end. (5.12 million viewers)
4	"What If He Can Change the Day"	Frederick King Keller	Henry Alonso Myers	November 29, 2006	4.72
While trying to find out who framed him, Hopper is starting to figure out what his partner, Andrea, did that caused her disagreement with Internal Affairs. (4.73 million viewers)
5	"What If They're Stuck"	Dwight H. Little	David Graziano	December 6, 2006	4.46
To prove his innocence, Brett visits the Internal Affairs office, twice, in search of the murder book. During his first visit, things aren't going like he planned but his second time isn't better when he doesn't have any other choice than taking someone hostage. (4.5 million viewers)
6	"What If They Find Him"	Rob Bowman	Charles Murray	December 13, 2006	3.94
Hopper tracks down a major player in the conspiracy to frame him for Garza's murder. He also discovers that he must continue to heed the warning of the consequences of his decisions when his actions turn out to affect the day in the worst possible ways imaginable. (3.1 million viewers or 3.94 million per Nielsen Media Research)
7	"What If He's Not Alone"	Andy Wolk	Jeffrey Bell & Steven Maeda	January 29, 2007 * April 20, 2008 ^	TBA
Hopper believes he may have found someone who is inadvertently involved in his never-ending day—and may also be caught in the same, repetitive loop.
8	"What If She's Lying"	Bryan Spicer	Paul Zbyszewski & Henry Alonso Myers	January 29, 2007 * April 27, 2008 ^	TBA
Hopper believes that Jennifer is somehow involved in his hellacious day and hiding something from him. In order to find out what she's afraid to admit, he pays a visit to his estranged mother to go through his father's old police files to find a connection.
9	"What If They're Connected"	Rob Bowman	Angela Russo & John Hlavin	January 29, 2007 * May 4, 2008 ^	TBA
Hopper discovers that a possible war between two rival gangs may be linked to his framing for the murder of Garza. Meanwhile, he pays a visit to Garza's murder scene and begins to piece together who may have really killed the Assistant District Attorney.
10	"What If He's Free"	Elodie Keene	David Graziano & Charles Murray	January 29, 2007 * May 11, 2008 ^	TBA
After coming face to face with Garza's murderer, Hopper wonders whether his never-ending day will finally end.
11	"What If He Walks Away"	Bryan Spicer	Jenny Lynn	February 4, 2007 * May 18, 2008 ^	TBA
Hopper tries walking away from the day with Rita, but his actions have decidedly negative consequences. Meanwhile, he discovers that someone he thought he could trust has betrayed him.
12	"What If She's the Key"	David Von Ancken	Jeffrey Bell & Paul Zbyszewski	February 12, 2007 * June 1, 2008 ^	TBA
Hopper discovers that Rita is hiding a secret from him that may play a pivotal role in his repeating day.
13	"What If It's Him"	Rob Bowman	Paul Zbyszewski & Jeffrey Bell	March 2, 2007 * June 8, 2008 ^	TBA
Hopper's day of reckoning finally is in sight and the answers to his questions are within his reach.

* = World premiere on ABC.com
^ = Television premiere on TV One

Viewers for the series on television averaged 6.5 million.

== Broadcast and cancelation ==
About the cancelation, Taye Diggs: "We didn’t get enough viewers. The network gave us a shot, and that’s what happened. I had a really great time on the show. It was one of the best scripts out there. It was the timing. Who knows why people tune in to what they do, but apparently they were not watching us."

Moon Bloodgood gave a similar statement about the cancellation: “I thought Day Break and Journeyman were great shows. Sometimes people want to say, “Oh, they’re too intelligent.” I give audiences way more credit. I don’t think it was that we weren’t good. I think it’s timing. I think sometimes things just don’t catch fire. Maybe it wasn’t good? But I know that I thought it was good and I, to this day, think they were good. I wouldn’t have done them if I didn’t think they were good.“

Adam Baldwin was also proud of the show: “I'll tell you, Day Break holds up if you watch it. If it was on a Netflix-type format where you could just sit down and watch it chronologically, it would really hold up. I think it had a big challenge being on commercial television and having the breaks in between. It's not a linear show. Like Memento: you wouldn't want to watch that if you had to have wait a week to see the second half or whatever. But I really enjoyed that.“

Mitch Pileggi thought the show was “pretty good“: “I wish that we had been able to hang in a little bit longer with that show. It was a good role, and it was a lot of fun, and I was interested in seeing where they were going to take that character.“

=== Online distribution ===
ABC had previously said that there were problems that kept the rest of the episodes from being shown online, calling them "unforeseen music clearance issues." On January 14, 2007, the network announced that the remaining episodes would be made available by the end of February. The first six episodes which had aired on television were posted on January 29, 2007, along with the first four unaired episodes.

The thirteenth and final episode, which was originally scheduled to be available on February 19, was delayed multiple times. After a nearly three-week wait, the finale premiered late on March 2. It was reported that the reasons for this delay concerned copyrighting issues with some of the original soundtrack from the final cut of the episode.

== DVD releases ==
On March 25, 2008, Day Break: The Complete Series was released on DVD in Region 1 by BCI Eclipse as a 4-disc set.

Mill Creek Entertainment subsequently re-released Day Break on September 29, 2009 as a 2-disc set.

== See also ==
- List of films featuring time loops
