= House of the Dead 2 (film) =

- Official DVD cover
- Directed by: Michael Hurst
- Screenplay by: Mark A. Altman
- Story by: Peter Scheerer; Michael Roesch
- Based on: The House of the Dead by Sega
- Produced by: Mark A. Altman; Mark Gottwald
- Starring: Emmanuelle Vaugier; Ed Quinn; Victoria Pratt; Ellie Cornell; Sid Haig; Sticky Fingaz
- Cinematography: Raymond Stella
- Edited by: Joseph Gutowski
- Music by: Joe Kraemer
- Production companies: Lions Gate Films; Mindfire Entertainment
- Distributed by: Lions Gate Films
- Release dates: October 14, 2005 (Sitges Film Festival); February 11, 2006 (United States)
- Running time: 96 minutes
- Country: United States
- Language: English

House of the Dead 2 (alternately titled House of the Dead II: Dead Aim) is a 2005 American action horror film and a sequel to the 2003 horror film House of the Dead. It is based on the video game series of the same name. The film was directed by Michael Hurst and starring Emmanuelle Vaugier and Ed Quinn. It premiered at the Sitges Film Festival in Spain on October 14, 2005, and premiered in the United States on the Sci Fi Channel on February 11, 2006.

== Plot ==
A few months after the first film's events, Professor Roy Curien at the fictional Cuesta Verde University (CVU) in Seattle has managed to subdue and contain a "Hyper sapiens" specimen, who is revealed to be his son, Rudy Curien (a survivor of the Isla del Morte incident). Curien experiments on another survivor (Alicia), trying to determine the source of her immortality, with apparent disregard for the rotted state of Alicia's body. When Curien creates a serum that he believes will bring back the dead and grant immortality, Curien murders one of his students and injects her with the serum. She returns to life, infects Curien, and breaks out of the building.

A month later, the university has a full-fledged outbreak, confirmed by AMS reconnaissance teams. Steven Ellis, an agent for AMS, goes in search of fellow agent Alexandra "Nightingale" Morgan. He finds her on a date at a restaurant, where she must execute several infected people before she returns to base with Ellis. After being ordered to retrieve a blood sample from the originally infected specimen on campus, they are warned that missiles will level the campus at midnight, regardless of whether the agents are still present. She assigns a gender-mixed Special Forces team of U.S. Marines to provide them with backup. Ellis openly questions the competence of the soldiers, leading to friction between the two units. Upon arrival at CVU, the soldiers encounter zombies. One soldier panics, and another becomes infected after his gun jams. When the others discover his injury, they sever his infected arm, but he turns and infects the team medic; Ellis executes both. The team continues forward into the university proper.

They battle through the hordes of infected, splitting into two teams. Two female soldiers, Lieutenant Alison Henson and Private Maria Rodriguez, and a male soldier, Bart, investigate the dorms. They break into a female dormitory, where they find a naked zombie body. A mosquito trapped in the room bites Bart, who attempts to pose with the corpse. Fearing contamination but unwilling to execute Bart, Henson handcuffs Bart to a radiator, and the two soldiers exit the room, falling back to the van.

Meanwhile, the second team, including Alex and Ellis, are attacked multiple times. Eventually, every soldier escorting them is killed, including the unit's leader, Sergeant Griffin. They fight their way to the professor's laboratory, finding the original specimen still imprisoned and a pair of students, Lonny and Sarah, who had survived. They enter the confinement room and extract blood from the zombie but are forced to kill it when it breaks free. Lonny and Sarah, who had allowed them into the confinement room, are overrun and torn apart by zombies, and Alex and Ellis escape while the zombies feed on the bodies.

Henson and Rodriguez make it to the extraction vehicle. There, they prepare to rescue Alex and Ellis, but a zombie who was locked in the back of the van by the soldier assigned to guard it bites Rodriguez. Henson executes Rodriguez, and the duo arrives in front of the science building as Alex and Ellis fight their way through a zombies horde. Henson saves Alex and Ellis but destroys the blood vial sample. They are forced to turn back, with ten minutes before the military releases the missile level the campus, and fight their way back to the confinement room. They retrieve a second vial, but Henson is bitten on the ankle. She remains behind and commits suicide as Alex and Ellis escape before the missile strikes the campus. Only Ellis makes it out before the missile hits, with Alex surrounded by zombies. Bart breaks free from the dormitory by amputating his hand and forces Ellis to hand over the vial. Bart decides to kill Ellis anyway, but Alex, having survived, kills Bart. His dying action is to pull the pin on a hand grenade, destroying the vial. Alex is wounded but uncertain of her condition. Ellis refuses to execute her. The two leave together as they head to Seattle, finding that the infection has spread to the rest of the city.

In a post-credit scene, the infected Curien from the school breathes heavily and looks frantically around.

== Cast ==
- Emmanuelle Vaugier as Dr. Alexandra / Alex "Nightingale" Morgan
- Ed Quinn as Lieutenant Steven Ellis
- Sticky Fingaz as Sergeant Dalton
- Steve Monroe as O'Conner
- Victoria Pratt as Lieutenant Alison Henson
- James Parks as Bart
- Dan Southworth as Nakagawa
- Billy Brown as Griffin
- Nadine Velazquez as Private Maria Rodriguez
- Ellie Cornell as Colonel Jordan Casper
- Sid Haig as Professor Roy Curien
- Mircea Monroe as Sarah Curtis
- Cam Powell as Lonny Evans
- Danielle Burgio as Alicia
- Theo Rossi as Greg Berlin
- Jennifer Holland as Sorority Girl
- Mark A. Altman as AMS Interrogator
- Chuck Speed as AMS Aide

== Critical reception ==
On review aggregator Rotten Tomatoes, House of the Dead 2 holds a 25% approval rating from 4 critics.

Ian Jane of DVD Talk rated it 1/5 stars and wrote, "Whereas [the first] film was so bad it was almost good (at least we could laugh at it), this straight-to-video sequel is just flat-out bad, and unfortunately, it's flat-out dull. ... House of the Dead 2 commits the ultimate celluloid sin – it's boring." Beyond Hollywood wrote, "If you were looking for a movie to show you how generic and formulaic horror movies in America have become lately, you needn't look any further than [House of the Dead 2]. ... [It is] indeed an improvement over Boll's original [but it] would have worked better had it stuck to camp and not taken the whole zombie thing too seriously." Bloody Disgusting rated it 3/5 stars and wrote, "Altman’s script skewers everything in its wake, poking fun at virtually anything it can gets its bloody hands on. But underneath all the pop culture banter lies an effective film, with some palpable tension and enough blood, grue and boobs to surprise even the most jaded zombie movie hater." Jon Condit of Dread Central rated it 3/5 stars and wrote that it is deserving of a chance despite its flaws. Reviewing the DVD, Steve Barton of Dread Central rated it 3/5 stars and wrote, "It's semi-blood soaked, filled with zombies, open for business, and dare I say it, it's actually not a bad visit!"

== Cancelled sequel ==
A third film, originally titled House of the Dead 3, had been discussed since mid 2006. Mark A. Altman said: "It's a completely different approach to the material than the first two films and I doubt it will even be called House of the Dead 3." The film directed by Patrick Dinhut and starring Dean Cain, which ended up with the title Dead and Deader when premiered on Syfy in December 2006 and released straight-to-DVD in 2007. No House of the Dead references were included in the final film.
