= Daniel Grodnik =

American film producer

- Born: May 30, 1952 (age 74); Minneapolis, Minnesota
- Occupations: Film producer; financier; screenwriter
- Known for: Producer of over 70 movies; Chairman/CEO of The National Lampoon magazine

Daniel Grodnik (born May 30, 1952) is an American film producer living in Los Angeles, California.

In 1989/1990, he and partner actor Tim Matheson took over National Lampoon, with Grodnik becoming the company's chairman and CEO.

Mr. Grodnik is a member of the Producers Guild of America and the Writers' Guild.

Grodnik is also an adjunct professor at the Dodge College of Film and Media Arts at Chapman University and annually grades the master's thesis in the Peter Stark producing program at his alma mater, the University of Southern California.

== Filmography ==
- Fast Charlie (Dec 2023) Pierce Brosnan, Morena Baccarin, James Caan (Producer)
- Maggie Moores (October 2021) Jon Hamm, Tina Fey (Executive Producer)
- Mindcage (August 2021) Martin Lawrence, John Malkovich (producer)
- The Second (March 2020) Ryan Phillippe (Producer)
- Disturbing the Peace (January 2020) Guy Pearce (Producer)
- The Fanatic (August 2019) John Travolta (Producer)
- Primal (November 2019) Nicolas Cage (producer)
- The Brawler (2019) (producer)
- Tiger (2018) Mickey Rourke (producer)
- Mara (2018) Olga Kurylenko (producer)
- 55 Steps (2017) Hilary Swank, Helena Bonham Carter(executive producer)
- Dear Dictator (2017) Michael Caine (producer)
- End of a Gun (2016) Steven Seagal (producer)
- Mothers and Daughters (2016) Susan Sarandon, Courtney Cox (executive producer)
- Exposed (2016) Keanu Reeves (executive producer)
- Heist (2015 film) Robert De Niro (executive producer)
- Drive Hard (2014) John Cusack, Thomas Jane (executive producer)
- Way of the Wicked (2014) Christian Slater (executive producer)
- Overnight (2012) (producer)
- Carjacked (2011) Maria Bello (producer)
- Stonerville (2011) (producer)
- Camille (2008) Sienna Miller, James Franco (producer)
- Safe Harbour (2007) (producer)
- Hallowed Ground (2007) (producer)
- Bobby (2006) Anthony Hopkins, Demi Moore, Lindsey Lohan (executive producer)
- Mini's First Time (2006) Alec Baldwin, Jeff Goldblum (executive producer)
- Come Early Morning (2006) Ashley Judd (executive producer)
- Glass Trap (2005) (executive producer)
- Slingshot (2005) David Arquette (consulting producer)
- Thralls (2005) (executive producer)
- Blue Demon (2004) (producer, writer, director)
- Pursued (2004) Christian Slater (producer)
- The Thing Below (2004) (executive producer)
- Who Is Cletis Tout? (2001) Tim Allen (producer)
- Lying in Wait (2001) Virginia Madsen (producer)
- Zack and Reba (1998) Brittany Murphy, Sean Patrick Flannery (producer, second unit director)
- At Sachem Farm also called Uncorked Minnie Driver, Nigel Hawthorne (1998) (producer)
- The Rage (1997) Roy Scheider, Gary Busey (producer)
- Powder (1995) Sean Patrick Flannery, Mary Steenburgen, Jeff Goldblum (producer)
- The Nature of the Beast (1995) Lance Henriksen, Eric Roberts (producer)
- Man's Best Friend (1993) (executive producer)
- Blind Fury (1989) Rutger Hauer (producer)
- 1969 (1988) Robert Downey Jr., Kiefer Sutherland (producer)
- Out of Control (1985) (producer, writer)
- High Road to China (1983) Tom Selleck (co-producer)
- MAD Magazine's Up The Academy (1980) (producer)
- Terror Train (1980) Jamie Lee Curtis, (executive producer, story by)
- Without Warning (1980) Jack Palance (co-producer, writer)
- Starhops (1978) (executive producer)
- For Pete's Sake (1974) Barbra Streisand (assistant to producer)

== Television ==
- Zombie Tidal Wave (SYFY) (2019) (executive Producer)
- Tag Team (2016) (executive producer, writer)
- Yeti: Curse Of The Snow Demon (2008) (producer, second unit director)
- Never Cry Werewolf (2008) (executive producer)
- Bloodsuckers (2005) (executive producer)
- Deep Evil (2004) (executive producer)
- Book of Days (2003) (executive producer)
- Mary Christmas (2002) (executive producer)
- Another Pretty Face (2002) (executive producer)
- Anna's Dream (2002) (executive producer)
- Sherlock Holmes Returns (1993) (executive producer)
- Northstar (1986) (executive producer, created by, writer)
- Goldie and the Bears (1984) (executive producer, created by, writer)
