= You Am I (film) =

2006 film

- Directed by: Kristijonas Vildžiūnas
- Written by: Kristijonas Vildžiūnas
- Produced by: Uljana Kim; Karl Baumgartner; Wolfgang Herold
- Starring: Andrius Bialobzeskis
- Music by: Linas Rimša
- Release date: 10 March 2006
- Running time: 90 minutes
- Country: Lithuania
- Language: Lithuanian

You Am I (Lithuanian: Aš esi tu) is a 2006 Lithuanian romance film directed by Kristijonas Vildžiūnas, screened in the Un Certain Regard section at the 2006 Cannes Film Festival.

== Cast ==
- Andrius Bialobzeskis - Baronas
- Jurga Jutaite - Dominyka
- Renata Veberyte Loman
- Mykolas Vildziunas
- Daiva Jovaisiene
