= Deep Evil =

- Directed by: Pat Williams
- Produced by: James Shavick; Kirk Shaw executive Jeffery Beach; Daniel Grodnik; Robert Snukal; Jim Wynorski (as Noble Henry)
- Starring: Lorenzo Lamas
- Release date: 2004
- Country: USA
- Language: English

Deep Evil is a 2004 American film directed by Pat Williams, starring Lorenzo Lamas, Ona Grauer and Adam J. Harrington.

== Plot ==
In the 1950s an alien microbe was found aboard a crashed alien spacecraft in remote Siberia. In the year 2004, US scientists working at a top secret underground laboratory in Alaska clone the microbe. A garbled distress signal is heard from the laboratory just before a complete lock down of the facility. This is the last word sent out from the scientists. A rescue team with scientists and military personnel is sent in to find out what went wrong.

== Cast ==
- Lorenzo Lamas as Trainor
- Ona Grauer as Dr. Cole
- Adam J. Harrington as Major Michael Ross
- Jim Thorburn as Professor Peter Langdon
- Will Sanderson as Sergeant Hall
- Rachel Hayward as Captain O'Brien
- Michael Kopsa as Colonel Harrison
- Lindsay Maxwell as General's Daughter
- Rachel Grodnik as Kim Cole
- Ron Selmour as Kimura
- Heather Feeney as Alien Lizard Creature
- Leah Cairns as Woman In Airlock
