= Tyron Leitso =

Canadian actor

- Born: January 7, 1976 (age 50); North Vancouver, British Columbia, Canada
- Years active: 1998–2015

Tyron Leitso (born January 7, 1976) is a Canadian actor.

== Advertising ==
Leitso has also appeared in commercial campaigns for "Salon Selectives", "Haggar Slacks", "The Florida Board of Health", "GTS Communications" (in Europe only), and "B.C. Tel/Telus", amongst others.

== Filmography ==
Year	Title	Role	Notes
1998	Breaker High	Brent Hardley	1 Episode
1998-1999	First Wave	David; Peter	2 episodes
2000	Shutterspeed	Eric Knox	TV movie
2000	Take Me Home: The John Denver Story	Student Producer	TV movie
2000	Mysterious Ways	Brent	1 Episode
2001	Edgemont	Derek MacMahon	7 episodes
2001	Snow White: The Fairest of Them All	Prince Alfred	TV movie
2002	Dinotopia	Karl Scott	3 episodes
2003	My Life Without Me	Guy in Bar	uncredited
2003	House of the Dead	Simon Cruz	
2004	Wonderfalls	Eric Gotts	14 episodes
2006	Whistler	Detective Rob Randall	3 episodes
2006	Masters of Horror	Rob Hanisey	1 Episode
2007	Seed	Jeffery	
2007	BloodRayne 2: Deliverance	Fleetwood	
2008	Far Cry	Operation Scientist	
2008	To Love and Die	Robert	TV movie
2009	Being Erica	Ethan Wakefield	24 episodes
2012	The Eleventh Victim	Adam	TV movie
2013	Assault on Wall Street	Spalding Smith	
2013	Suddenly	Agent Wheeler	
2014	My Boyfriends' Dogs	Cole	TV movie
2015	Family for Christmas	Ben	TV movie
