= Werner Fasslabend =

Austrian jurist and politician

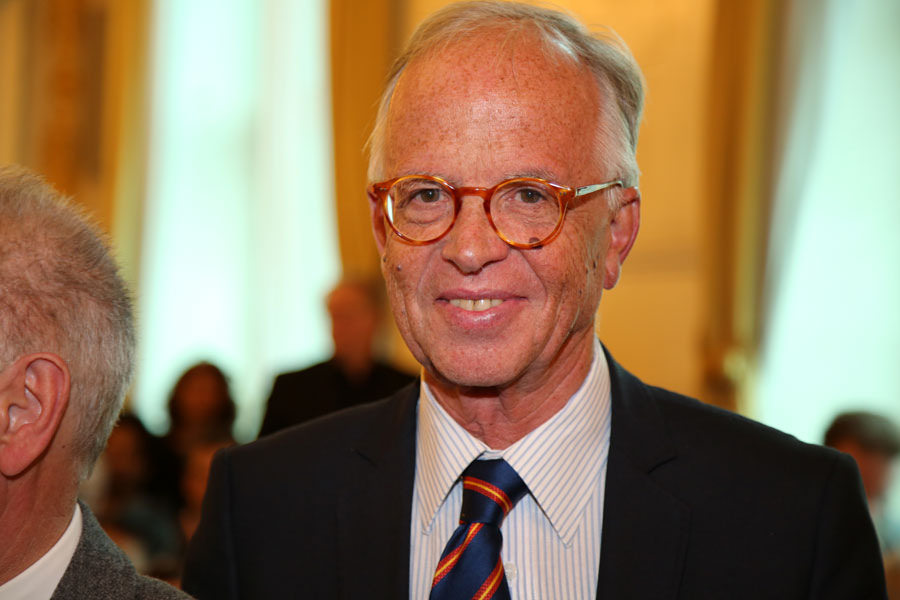

Personal details
- Born: 5 April 1944 (age 81) Marchegg, Gänserndorf District, Lower Austria, Austria
- Political party: People's Party

Werner Fasslabend (born 5 March 1944) is an Austrian jurist and politician (OeVP). He was Minister of Defense from 1990 until 2000.

From 1987 to 1990, briefly in 1994, 1996, and again from 1999 to 2007 Fasslabend had a mandate for the People's Party in the Austrian National Council; from 2000 to 2002 he served as its third president.

Fasslabend is director of the Austrian Institute for European and Security Policy, as well as Honorary Knight of the Order of St. George.

== See also ==
- Austrian Armed Forces
