= Alone in the Dark II (film) =

2008 film by Peter Scheerer and Michael Roesch

- DVD cover
- Directed by: Michael Roesch; Peter Scheerer
- Written by: Michael Roesch; Peter Scheerer
- Based on: Alone in the Dark by Infogrames
- Produced by: Uwe Boll; Ari Taub
- Starring: Rick Yune; Rachel Specter; Lance Henriksen
- Cinematography: Zoran Popovic
- Edited by: Joe Pascual
- Music by: Jessica de Rooij
- Production companies: HJB Filmproduktion; Boll Kino Beteiligungs GmbH & Co. KG; Brooklyn Independent Studios; Hans J. Baer Filmproduktion; Infogrames Entertainment
- Distributed by: Splendid Film & WVG Medien GmbH (Germany); High Fliers Video Distribution (UK); Universal Studios Home Entertainment (US)
- Release dates: September 25, 2008 (Germany); March 26, 2009 (United Arab Emirates); January 26, 2010 (United States)
- Running time: 87 minutes
- Countries: United States; Germany
- Language: English
- Box office: $133,867

Alone in the Dark II is a 2008 horror film written and directed by Peter Scheerer and Michael Roesch and starring Rick Yune, Rachel Specter and Lance Henriksen. It is a standalone sequel to Uwe Boll's 2005 film Alone in the Dark, featuring an entirely new cast and a story that is unrelated to the original film.

== Premise ==
Former witch-hunter Abner Lundberg is forced to come back to fight his old nemesis, a century-old dangerous witch out on the prowl again. This time, Lundberg joins forces with Edward Carnby and they attempt to track down the dangerous witch Elisabeth Dexter.

== Cast ==
- Rick Yune as Edward Carnby
- Rachel Specter as Natalie
- Lance Henriksen as Abner Lundberg
- Bill Moseley as Dexter
- Ralf Möller as Boyle
- Danny Trejo as Perry
- Zack Ward as Xavier
- Natassia Malthe as Turner
- Jason Connery as Parker
- Michael Paré as Willson
- P. J. Soles as Martha
- Brooklyn Sudano as Sinclair
- Allison Lange as Elizabeth Dexter / Witch
- Peter Looney as Ward Dexter
- Lisette Bross as Old Witch
- Louise Griffiths as Witch Voice (voice)

== Production ==
Alone in the Dark II was filmed in New York City and Los Angeles during 2007. Peter Scheerer and Michael Roesch were brought on to write and direct the film, with Uwe Boll serving as one of the producers.

== Release ==
The film was released in Germany on September 25, 2008, in the United Kingdom on July 27, 2009 and in the United States on January 26, 2010. A Blu-ray release was issued on January 26, 2010, in the United States and was sold through Best Buy exclusively.

=== Box office ===
Though largely a straight-to-video release in several territories including the United States, the film did receive a brief theatrical release in the United Arab Emirates on March 26, 2009 where it grossed $133,867 in total.

== Reception ==
Reviewing the film for IGN, R.L. Shaffer wrote: "Uwe Boll's Alone in the Dark did not require a sequel. Critics hated the film. Fans hated the film. ... Thankfully though, Alone in the Dark II is actually a much better film than the first. It's a touch light on action, and the setting is far more limited in terms of production design, but the tone is a little more in keeping with the ideas of the game franchise. ... Look at Alone in the Dark II more as a reboot than a sequel and it plays OK". A reviewer for Dread Central was critical in their review, writing that "There's really nothing to see here. It doesn't even have the epic train wreck quality of Boll's original. It's just a plain ol' bad movie." One of the site's other journalists examined it as part of a retrospective of the series, noting that they "think that the flick has its merits, boasting higher production value and better cinematography combined with a somber tone more in line with the game's horrific atmosphere. But, I can assure readers that it is definitely not better than the first one." Sebastian Zavala Kahn of MásGamers called it "tedious and unambitious, but at least better than the previous one." /Film wrote: [...] could Alone in the Dark 2 be the home video unicorn? a DTV sequel that's actually better than the first? — but unfortunately the movie is simply bad and underwhelming in its own ways."

YouTube critic James Stephanie Sterling reviewed the film along with Conrad Zimmerman on their podcast, remarking that the film was terrible enough that it was hard to believe there could be worse films.
