= Alone in the Dark (2005 film) =

2005 film by Uwe Boll

- Theatrical release poster
- Directed by: Uwe Boll
- Written by: Elan Mastai; Michael Roesch; Peter Scheerer
- Based on: Alone in the Dark by Infogrames
- Produced by: Uwe Boll; Wolfgang Herold; Shawn Williamson
- Starring: Christian Slater; Tara Reid; Stephen Dorff
- Cinematography: Mathias Neumann
- Edited by: Richard Schwadel
- Music by: Reinhard Besser; Oliver Lieb; Bernd Wendlandt; Peter Zweier
- Production companies: Artisan Entertainment; Boll KG Entertainment; Herold Productions; Brightlight Pictures; Infogrames Entertainment
- Distributed by: Odeon Films (Canada); Concorde Filmverleih (Germany); Lions Gate Films (United States)
- Release dates: 28 January 2005 (United States & Canada); 3 February 2005 (Germany)
- Running time: 96 minutes
- Countries: Canada; Germany; United States
- Language: English
- Budget: $20 million
- Box office: $12.7 million

Alone in the Dark is a 2005 action horror film directed by Uwe Boll and written by Elan Mastai, Michael Roesch, and Peter Scheerer. Based on the video game series of the same name, it stars Christian Slater, Tara Reid, and Stephen Dorff as paranormal investigators who combat a supernatural threat. The film's story is a loose adaptation of the game Alone in the Dark: The New Nightmare (2001).

Upon release, the film was poorly received by critics for the story, dialogue, special effects, and Reid's performance. Holding a 1% approval rating on Rotten Tomatoes, Alone in the Dark is considered one of the worst films ever made. It was also a box-office bomb, grossing $12.7 million on a $20 million budget, although the home media releases were more successful. A sequel with a different cast and story was released to home media in 2008; Boll served as a producer.

== Plot ==
Edward Carnby, a paranormal investigator, has a nightmare in which he hides from alien-like creatures as a child. Carnby flies to an urban museum where his girlfriend, Aline Cedrac, is an assistant curator. Carnby holds an artifact-puzzle piece of the Abkani, an extinct Native American tribe. A strange man follows Carnby and attacks him with supernatural strength, but the man dies after many escape attempts by Carnby. Simultaneously, a ship recovers a gold coffin from the ocean floor. After docking, the captain locks up the curator of the museum, Prof. Hudgens, while his crew opens the coffin. Hudgens escapes to find everyone killed by a mysterious creature and the coffin empty. Hudgens finds a secret compartment, collects an artifact from the coffin, and goes ashore.

Several people across the western US and Canada walk off into the night after hearing an ear-splitting screech, and Carnby passes out while studying his artifact. Bureau 713, where Carnby used to work, becomes aware of evidence of electromagnetic waves by a surveillance team. Carnby thinks it is related to the Abkani because everyone who disappeared was from the same location. Carnby arrives that evening at the museum with the artifact, and Cedrac shows him another recently arrived Abkani artifact that she has been studying since Hudgens' absence. The mysterious creature from the ship attacks them inside the museum, killing a security guard. Carnby and Cedrac hide in a storage closet until troopers from Bureau 713 arrive, and the creature retreats. Carnby attempts to relay information to their team leader, Commander Burke, but Burke tells him to stay out of it. Carnby asks his former co-workers, including staff surgeon and pathologist Sam Fischer, about the creature.

Hudgens returns to the museum with a captured creature and uses a syringe to draw fluid from the creature to study it as part of his research in combining the DNA of man and beast. Carnby investigates his past by visiting his former orphanage to learn more about Hudgens' research.

While patrolling the museum, several creatures attack Bureau 713 soldiers. Several soldiers and most of the creatures, who are revealed to be people who disappeared earlier, are killed. Carnby arrives, and Burke again tells him to stay away. During a scuffle, Carnby picks Burke's pocket containing his security badge. Carnby goes to Bureau 713 and talks with Fischer in the morgue while looking at one of the corpses. Fischer shows Carnby a small, centipede-like creature in the dorsal spine of his old friend. Fischer also discovers that Carnby has one of his own in his body, but it is dead, presumably because of the electroshock Carnby had as a child. Burke and his men arrive and escort Carnby out of the building. That evening, Hudgens ambushes Fischer at his home and inserts a baby creature into Fischer's mouth.

Carnby discovers that the Abkani had fought the creatures, which can be killed by light. They also disrupt electrical light, creating blackouts. The Abkani artifacts found all over the world open the gate to another dimension, where millions of creatures sleep, waiting to be freed. Hudgens further experiments, injecting himself with the blood of one of the creatures, which allows him to control the monsters. Carnby, Cedrac, Burke, and Burke's military squad go to an abandoned gold mine near Carnby's orphanage, where there are strong electromagnetic disruptions. They are attacked by dozens of the creatures; only Carnby, Cedrac, and Burke survive. They reach the underground surgery room where the baby creature was transplanted into Carnby. There, Hudgens takes Carnby's artifact and opens the gate. Millions of creatures awaken and run towards the gate. Burke kills Hudgens. The group places a bomb and runs away, only to realize that they cannot detonate it remotely. Burke returns and sacrifices himself. Carnby and Cedrac rise to the surface at dawn but find the city evacuated. As they walk down the street, something runs toward them.

== Cast ==
- Christian Slater as Edward Carnby: Raised in an orphanage under Sister Clara, Carnby lost his memory when he was ten years old. At twenty, he was recruited by Bureau 713, gaining knowledge on the paranormal soon after. His current assignment is investigating his past along with researching the disappearance of the Abkani. Due to the experiments conducted on him as a child, he has the ability to sense paranormal activity and has increased strength and speed, which allow him to perform acrobatic moves that a normal human could not do.
  - Dustyn Arthurs as Young Edward
- Tara Reid as Aline Cedrac, an archaeologist and museum curator; Edward's girlfriend who knows about the Abkani and their culture.
- Stephen Dorff as Commander Richard Burke, the Commander of Bureau 713, formerly worked under Carnby's direction.
- Frank C. Turner as Agent Fischer, the head of the medical unit of Bureau 713; he is one of Carnby's few trusted allies and friends.
- Matthew Walker as Professor Lionel Hudgens
- Will Sanderson as Agent Miles
- Mike Dopud as Agent Turner; he is killed by Fischer while working on a power generator
- Françoise Yip as Agent Cheung
- Mark Acheson as Captain Chernick
- Darren Shahlavi as John Dillon
- Karin Konoval as Sister Clara, owner of the orphanage which cared for Edward. In the '80s, she was persuaded by Hudgens to allow experiments on the orphans. She keeps this secret from everyone but is inwardly guilty for her immoral actions.
- Ed Anders as James Pinkerton, a former Agent of Bureau 713 who went missing in action in the 1980s. He and Hudgens were in charge of the investigation of the disappearance of gold-miners at Brutan Goldmine. Pinkerton became an experiment for Hudgens, who attached a Xenos creature to his spine. His abilities included increased awareness, strength, speed and willpower.
- Brendan Fletcher as Cab driver

== Production ==
Blair Erickson came up with the first drafts of the script for Alone in the Dark. According to Erickson, Uwe Boll suggested through various e-mails changes that would turn it from a thriller into an action film. Erickson stated his disgust at the treatment and spoke negatively of his working relationship with Boll on Something Awful:

The original script took the Alone in the Dark premise and depicted it as if it were actually based on a true story of a private investigator in the northeastern U.S. whose missing persons cases begin to uncover a disturbing paranormal secret. It was told through the eyes of a writer following Edward Carnby and his co-worker for a novel and depicted them as real-life blue-collar folks who never expected to find hideous beings waiting for them in the dark. We tried to stick close to the H. P. Lovecraft style and the low-tech nature of the original game, always keeping the horror in the shadows so you never saw what was coming for them.

Thankfully Dr. Boll was able to hire his loyal team of hacks to crank out something much better than our crappy story and add in all sorts of terrifying horror movie essentials like opening gateways to alternate dimensions, bimbo blonde archaeologists, sex scenes, mad scientists, slimy dog monsters, special army forces designed to battle slimy CG dog monsters, Tara Reid, "Matrix" slow-motion gun battles, and car chases. Oh yeah, and a ten-minute opening back story scroll read aloud to the illiterate audience, the only people able to successfully miss all the negative reviews.

I mean hell, Boll knows that's where the real scares lie.

As a result, there were seven distinct scripts in circulation without a consensus to which one was used.

Artisan Entertainment picked up North American distribution rights to the film in June 2003.

== Release ==
Alone in the Dark was released in Canada and the United States on January 28, 2005. It was released in Germany on February 3, 2005.

The film was released on VHS and DVD on 10 May 2005 by Lions Gate Home Entertainment. An unrated director's cut was released in Germany, France, and Australia and was #1 on the German DVD market for three weeks. It was released on DVD in North America on 25 September 2007. In the newest version of the film, the sex scene between Carnby and Aline has been removed.

== Original film and game tie-in concept ==
Originally, the film version of Alone in the Dark was to be released with Alone in the Dark (2008); however, the developers of the game, Eden Games, delayed and reworked it entirely from scratch. Boll stated his disappointment on the region 1 DVD commentary but also said that Atari had face shots of Christian Slater for Alone in the Dark, which was released on June 26, 2008.

== Reception ==
=== Box office ===
Alone in the Dark grossed $2.8 million in its opening weekend, ranking at #12; by the end of its run, the film had grossed $12.7 million worldwide.

=== Critical response ===
On Rotten Tomatoes, Alone in the Dark has an approval rating of 1% based on 120 reviews with an average rating of 2.2/10. The site’s critical consensus reads: "Inept on almost every level, Alone in the Dark may not work as a thriller, but it's good for some head-slapping, incredulous laughter". On Metacritic, the film has a score of 9 out of 100, based on 25 critics, indicating "overwhelming dislike". Audiences surveyed by CinemaScore gave the film a rare F grade.

Scott Brown of Entertainment Weekly gave the film an F grade, commenting that the film was "so bad it's postmodern". In the film's only positive review listed by Rotten Tomatoes, Michelle Alexandria of Eclipse Magazine wrote: "Alone in the Dark isn't going to set the world on fire, but it largely succeeds with what it has to work with. Just don't take it seriously and you'll have a fun time".

Dustin Putman had wrote in his review of the film, ""Alone in the Dark," a collection of howlingly bad dialogue and every half-assed horror/sci-fi movie cliche imaginable, opens with a white-print-on-black-background scroll (think "Star Wars") that, at first, seems to be setting up the story."

=== Accolades ===
Date	Award	Category	Recipients	Result	Ref.
March 3, 2006	Stinkers Bad Movie Awards	Worst Picture	Alone in the Dark (Lionsgate)	Won	
March 3, 2006	Stinkers Bad Movie Awards	Worst Director	Uwe Boll	Won	
March 3, 2006	Stinkers Bad Movie Awards	Worst Actress	Tara Reid	Won	
March 3, 2006	Stinkers Bad Movie Awards	Worst Song or Song Performance in a Film or Its End Credits	"Wish I Had an Angel", by Nightwish	Nominated	
March 3, 2006	Stinkers Bad Movie Awards	Least "Special" Special Effects	Alone in the Dark (Lionsgate)	Won	
March 4, 2006	Golden Raspberry Awards	Worst Actress	Tara Reid	Nominated	
March 4, 2006	Golden Raspberry Awards	Worst Director	Uwe Boll	Nominated	

== Soundtrack ==
Alone in the Dark: Music from and Inspired by Alone in the Dark

Soundtrack album by Various artists
- Released: 25 January 2005
- Genre: Heavy metal
- Length: 2:31:47
- Label: Nuclear Blast
- Producers: All Shall Perish, Matt Bayles, Rob Caggiano, Steve Carr, Andy Classen, Jean-Francois Dagenais, Brian Joseph Dobbs, Dying Fetus, Patrick W. Engel, Steve Evetts, Fear Factory, Robert Flynn, Jacob Hansen, Tuomas Holopainen, TeeCee Kinnunen, Meshuggah, Misery Index, Fredrik Nordström, Zack Ohren, Eric Rachel, Nick Raskulinecz, Samael, Ben Schigel, Andy Sneap, Waldemar Sorychta, Patrik J. Sten, Peter Tägtgren, Devin Townsend, Paul Trust, Zeuss

Professional ratings
Review scores
Source	Rating
AllMusic	4.5/5 stars

The 2-disc soundtrack was released by Nuclear Blast, with Wolfgang Herold as executive producer. The German band Agathodaimon's contribution was the title song. Finnish symphonic metal band Nightwish had a music video of "Wish I Had an Angel" directed by Uwe Boll, with clips from the film.

Disc 1
No.	Title	Performed by	Length
1.	"Vredesbyrd"	Dimmu Borgir	4:44
2.	"What Drives the Weak"	Shadows Fall	4:43
3.	"Cyberwaste"	Fear Factory	3:16
4.	"Touch of Red"	In Flames	2:51
5.	"Devour"	Strapping Young Lad	2:52
6.	"Peace"	Agnostic Front feat. Jamey Jasta	2:22
7.	"Gone Forever"	God Forbid	4:26
8.	"Down Again"	Chimaira	4:20
9.	"Lost to Apathy"	Dark Tranquillity	4:36
10.	"Blacklist"	Exodus	6:15
11.	"Imperium"	Machine Head	6:41
12.	"Stabbing the Drama"	Soilwork	4:31
13.	"Daylight Dancer"	Lacuna Coil	3:48
14.	"Panasonic Youth"	The Dillinger Escape Plan	2:26
15.	"Rational Gaze"	Meshuggah	5:01
16.	"Wish I Had an Angel"	Nightwish	4:02
17.	"Mother of Abominations"	Cradle of Filth	7:32

Disc 2
No.	Title	Performed by	Length
1.	"Dead Eyes See No Future"	Arch Enemy	4:13
2.	"The Devil Incarnate"	Death Angel	6:03
3.	"Medieval"	Diecast	3:48
4.	"Daughter of the Damned"	Fireball Ministry	4:19
5.	"The Weapon They Fear"	Heaven Shall Burn	4:38
6.	"Eraser"	Hypocrisy	4:24
7.	"Blood and Thunder"	Mastodon feat. Neil Fallon	3:48
8.	"The Great Depression"	Misery Index	2:38
9.	"Ghost"	Mnemic	3:25
10.	"Slaughtervain"	Dew-Scented	4:19
11.	"Souls to Deny"	Suffocation	5:45
12.	"Watch Out"	Raunchy	4:29
13.	"As I Slither"	Kataklysm	2:56
14.	"Outnumbering the Day"	Bloodbath	3:14
15.	"Deconstruction"	All Shall Perish	2:50
16.	"Minion"	Bleed the Sky	4:11
17.	"On Earth"	Samael	4:00
18.	"One Shot, One Kill"	Dying Fetus	4:25
19.	"99"	The Haunted	3:56

== Reboot ==
In December 2025, Boll announced a reboot film adaptation in the video game series, this time based on the 2024 reboot game of the same name, along with a planned television series is in development.

== See also ==
- List of 21st century films considered the worst
- List of American films of 2005
- List of films based on video games
