= Victoria Pratt =

Canadian actress and model

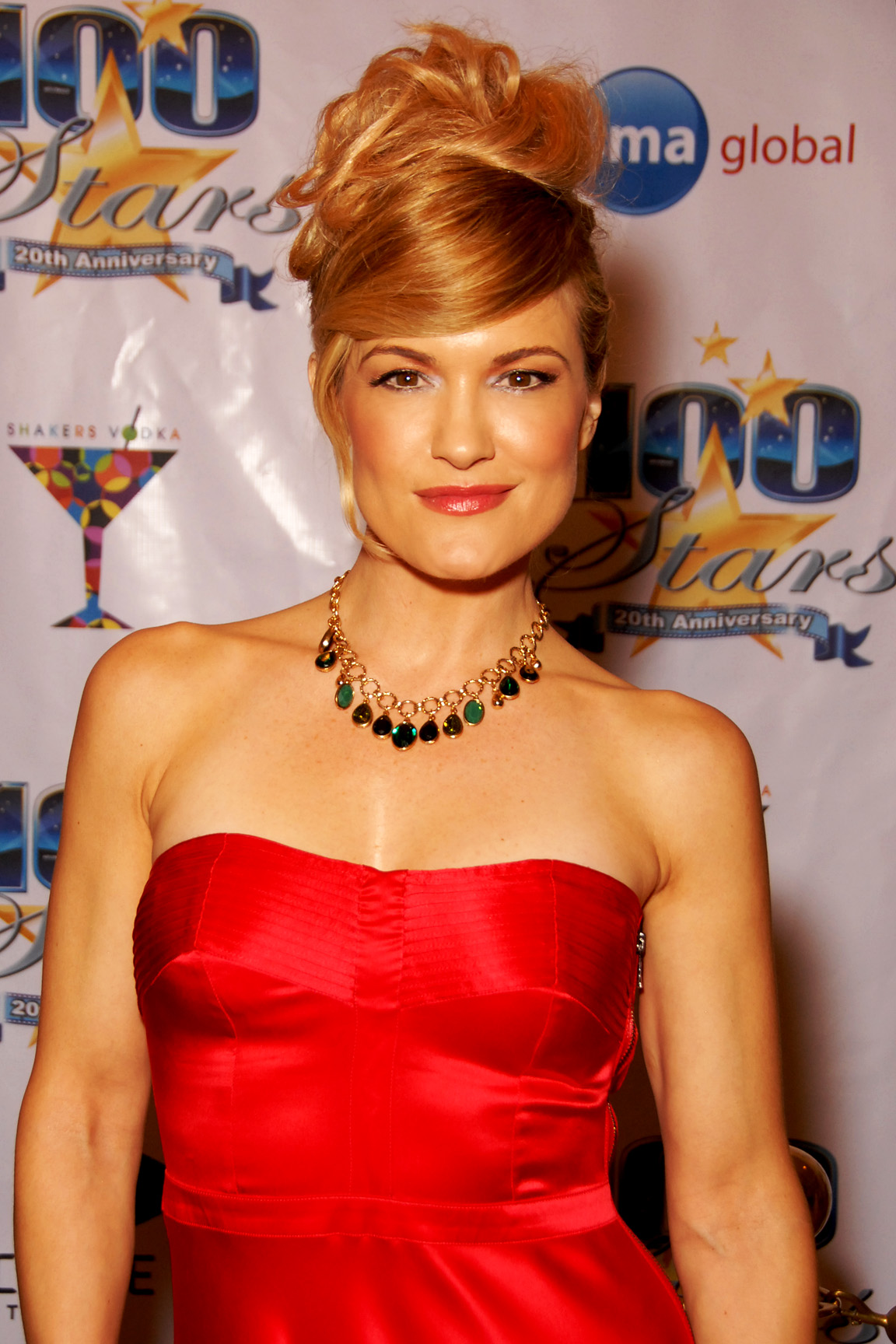
- Pratt attending the "Night of 100 Stars" for the 82nd Academy Awards viewing party in March 2010
- Born: Victoria Ainslie Pratt; December 18, 1970 (age 55); Chesley, Ontario, Canada
- Other name: Vicky Pratt
- Occupations: Actress, fitness model, author
- Years active: 1997–present
- Spouses: T. J. Scott (m. 2000; div. 2016) Trace Adkins (m. 2019)

Victoria Ainslie Pratt (born December 18, 1970) is a Canadian actress, author and fitness model.

== Early life ==
Pratt grew up in Chesley, Ontario, a self described "tomboy at heart." She attended the kinesiology program at York University in Toronto and graduated summa cum laude. Before starting her acting career, Pratt made a notable mark in the fitness world as a performance tester, working at the York University campus with various athletes including players from the Toronto Maple Leafs and San Jose Sharks, among others.

== Career ==
After graduating from York, Pratt met Robert Kennedy, publisher of MuscleMag, who convinced Pratt to try her hand at modelling and acting. Pratt quickly found success as a fitness model, gracing several magazine covers (including MuscleMag and Oxygen) and working alongside future WWE stars Trish Stratus and Torrie Wilson.

Pratt eventually began to land starring acting roles on television throughout the late 1990s, including Xena: Warrior Princess, Once a Thief, Cleopatra 2525 (which she starred in for two seasons), and Mutant X (which she starred in for three seasons).

Pratt made her film debut in the 1998 film titled Legacy, alongside David Hasselhoff, directed by her future husband, T. J. Scott. Pratt also starred in several independent or small made-for-TV movies during the 1990s and early 2000s.

Pratt has since garnered a small cult following who recognize her large body of work as an actress in cancelled, but popular low-budget science fiction productions. There were several Tumblr fan pages and websites dedicated to Pratt. AskMen called her a "butt-kicking sci-fi queen."

Since the mid-2000s, Pratt has guest-starred on several hit TV series including CSI: Crime Scene Investigation (2009), NCIS (2010), Lie to Me (2011), and Castle (2013). In 2006, Pratt co-starred with model Josie Moran in the film The Mallory Effect which premiered at the Slamdance Film Festival. The same year Pratt starred with Taye Diggs on the ABC television series Day Break (2006), which premiered on November 15, 2006.

Pratt has continued modelling throughout her career, being named Oxygen Magazine's "Cover Girl" in 2011. She is a published author of adult fiction, her first book being Double Down.

== Personal life ==
Pratt married director and photographer T. J. Scott in 2000; they divorced in 2016.

She divides her time between Toronto, Los Angeles, Nashville, and New Zealand. Pratt has a blue belt in Shotokan karate and is a keen kickboxer.

In her interview with Oxygen Magazine, Pratt said she enjoyed "salsa dancing, hiking in the Hollywood hills and volleyball."

On October 12, 2019, Pratt married American country singer Trace Adkins in New Orleans, Louisiana. Blake Shelton officiated the wedding.

== Filmography ==
=== Film ===
| Year | Title | Role | Notes |
|---|---|---|---|
| 1998 | Whatever It Takes | Fitness Instructor | Uncredited |
| 1998 | Legacy | Ding | |
| 2002 | The Mallory Effect | Jennifer | |
| 2005 | House of the Dead 2 | Lieutenant Alison Henson | |
| 2006 | Comedy Hell | Kelli | |
| 2007 | What Love Is | Sara | |
| 2007 | Brotherhood of Blood | Carrie Rieger | |
| 2011 | Your Love Never Fails | Anne Marie | Direct to video |
| 2012 | Soda Springs | Shelly | |
| 2012 | Gabe the Cupid Dog | Marsha | |
| 2012 | Away | | |
| 2012 | Christmas Twister | Addison | |
| 2012 | Dracano | Carla Simms | |
| 2014 | Death Valley | Jamie Dillen | |
| 2014 | Vespucci | | |
| 2014 | La Migra | Special Agent Dunthorpe | |
| 2014 | The Virginian | Molly West | Direct to video |
| 2015 | Into Dangerous Territory | Mia Martin | |
| 2015 | June | Lily Anderson | |
| 2016 | The Last Heist | Pascal | |
| 2016 | Cops and Robbers | Cheryl | |
| 2016 | Flight 192 | Michelle Taylor | |
| 2017 | Lazer Team 2 | Major Kilborne | |
| 2018 | My Daughter is Innocent | Lisa Mitchell | |
| 2021 | Apache Junction | Christine Williams | |
| 2022 | Desperate Riders | Carol | |
| 2023 | Among Wolves | Elizabeth | |

=== Television ===
| Year | Title | Role | Notes |
|---|---|---|---|
| 1997 | Once a Thief: Brother Against Brother | Jackie Janczyk | Television film |
| 1998 | Once a Thief: Family Business | Jackie Janczyk | Television film |
| 1998 | Once a Thief | Jackie Janczyk | Recurring role, 8 episodes |
| 1998 | Xena: Warrior Princess | Cyane | Episodes: "Adventures in the Sin Trade: Parts 1 and 2" |
| 1999 | Forbidden Island | Wilkes | Episode: "Pilot" |
| 2000 | First Wave | Claire Wilson | Episode: "Tomorrow" |
| 2000 | Blacktop | Charlie | Television film |
| 2000–2001 | Cleopatra 2525 | Rose "Sarge" | Main role, 28 episodes |
| 2001–2004 | Mutant X | Shalimar Fox | Main role, 66 episodes |
| 2005 | Hush | Callie | Television film |
| 2005 | Mayday | Simms | Television film |
| 2005 | Murder at the Presidio | Cpl. Tara Jeffries | Television film |
| 2006 | Her Fatal Flaw | Laney Hennessey | Television film |
| 2006 | Kraken: Tentacles of the Deep | Nicole | Television film |
| 2006–2007 | Day Break | Andrea Battle | Main role, 13 episodes |
| 2007 | Ghost Whisperer | Prof. Claudia Pollili | Episode: "Double Exposure" |
| 2007 | Hush Little Baby | Jamie | Television film |
| 2008 | Journey to the Center of the Earth | Martha Dennison | Television film |
| 2008 | Moonlight | Dee Dee Dwight | Episode: "Fated to Pretend" |
| 2008 | Life | Diane Graham | Episode: "Badge Bunny" |
| 2009 | CSI: Crime Scene Investigation | Carla Banks | Episode: "The Grave Shift" |
| 2009 | Fear Itself | Robbie Collins | Episode: "The Circle" |
| 2009 | Cold Case | Vanessa Quarterman | Episode: "Mind Games" |
| 2010 | NCIS | Tiffany | Episode: "Jet Lag" |
| 2010 | Mongolian Death Worm | Alicia | Television film |
| 2011 | Lie to Me | Lily | Episode: "Rebound" |
| 2012 | A Nanny's Revenge | Brynn Randall | Television film |
| 2013 | Castle | Jane Garrison/Leann Piper | Episode: "Significant Others" |
| 2014-2019 | Heartland | Casey McMurtry | Recurring role, 25 episodes |
| 2014 | A Daughter's Nightmare | Dana Morgan | Television film |
| 2015 | Hawaii Five-0 | Mrs. Harper | Episode: "Ka'Alapahi Nui (Big Lie)" |
| 2015 | Patient Killer | Victoria Wrightmar | Television film |
| 2015 | A Date to Die For | Laura Armstrong | Television film |
| 2016 | Campus Caller | Detective Victoria Duncan | Television film |
| 2016 | Turbulence | Michelle Taylor | Television film |
| 2018 | Caught | Doloris Patterson | Miniseries |
| 2019 | Hudson and Rex | Lori Shciff | "The Woods Have Eyes" |
