= Rick Yune =

American actor (born 1971)

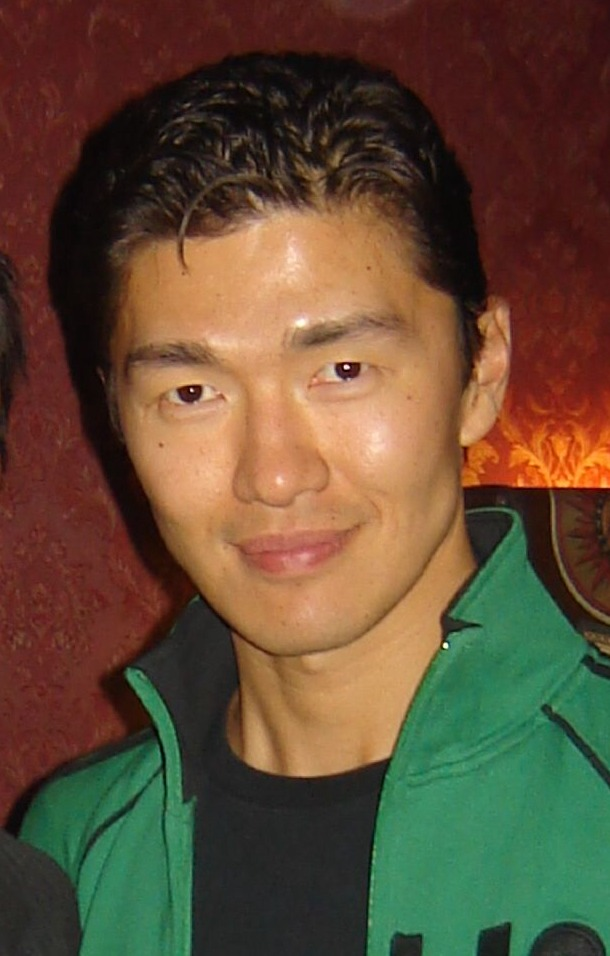
- Yune in 2007
- Born: Richard Yun; August 22, 1971 (age 55); Washington, D.C., U.S.
- Education: University of Pennsylvania (BS)
- Occupation: Actor
- Years active: 1997–present
- Relatives: Karl Yune (brother)

Richard Yune (born August 22, 1971) is an American actor, screenwriter, producer, and martial artist of Korean descent. His most notable roles have been in the movies Snow Falling on Cedars, the first Fast & Furious film The Fast and the Furious, the James Bond movie Die Another Day, and Olympus Has Fallen. He was part of the main cast of the Netflix original series Marco Polo. He made his debut in the Indian cinema in the 2025 Indian-Malayalam language film L2: Empuraan, which he played a cameo role.

== Early life ==
Yune was born in Washington, D.C. to mother Park Wonhui and father Yun Taeho, who were both Korean. His younger brother is actor Karl Yune.

Yune was educated at Our Lady of Good Counsel High School (Olney, Maryland) and St. John's College High School. In 1994, he received his degree in finance from the University of Pennsylvania's Wharton School. Yune was one of the original hedge fund traders for SAC Capital but left to pursue entrepreneurial ventures.

Yune practices many forms of martial arts, but he excels in Taekwondo (in which he holds a black belt) and boxing (he is a former Golden Gloves boxer). He changed the spelling of his last name from "Yun" to "Yune" for Screen Actors Guild (SAG) purposes.

== Career ==
While studying at Wharton, Rick Yune worked as an intern on Wall Street trading stocks in mid-1992. During that time, he was "discovered" by a modeling agent and soon became the first Asian-American featured in advertisements for Versace and Ralph Lauren's Polo.

Yune made his film debut in 1999, playing Kazuo Miyamoto, a Japanese-American war hero accused of killing a respected fisherman (played by Daniel von Bargen) in the close-knit community, in director Scott Hicks' film adaptation of David Guterson's post-World War II novel, Snow Falling on Cedars. Yune co-starred as Johnny Tran, a Vietnamese gang leader and the rival of Vin Diesel's character, in the 2001 film The Fast and the Furious. In 2002, Yune portrayed Zao, a North Korean terrorist who works for the Korean People's Army, opposite Pierce Brosnan and Halle Berry, in the James Bond film Die Another Day. That year Yune was voted one of People magazine's "Sexiest Man Alive".

Yune appeared in the 2004 video "Call U Sexy" by the band VS, as well as in Someone (1997) by SWV, featuring Sean "Puffy" Combs. Yune appeared in two 2005 episodes of ABC's spy series Alias, playing a modern-day samurai Kazu Tamazaki who is hunted down by Jennifer Garner as Sydney. He also appeared as a guest in an episode of ABC's legal dramedy series Boston Legal and the CBS crime drama CSI: Crime Scene Investigation. He produced and starred as a Thai assassin in the action/adventure movie The Fifth Commandment, directed by Jesse V. Johnson, and also stars Keith David and Bokeem Woodbine. Yune starred with Russell Crowe and Lucy Liu in the 2012 martial arts film, The Man with the Iron Fists.

In 2013, Yune played Kang Yeon-Sak, a North Korean ultra-nationalist and ex-terrorist mastermind who plans a terrorist attack on the White House, in the action thriller Olympus Has Fallen, opposite Gerard Butler.

In 2014, Yune took on the role of Kaidu, a Mongol Khan, in the historical drama series Marco Polo. Yune reprised his role in the second season, which was released in 2016. In 2025, he made his debut in Indian cinema in L2: Empuraan, as the enigmatic figure in the poster with a red dragon printed on a coat. Rick Yune was voted one of the 50 HOTTEST MEN OF ALL TIME by Harper's Bazaar 2025.

=== Other work ===
Yune is a board member of the Center for Global Dialogue and Cooperation and an ambassador for the Princess Charlene Foundation of Monaco.

== Filmography ==
List of film credits
Year	Title	Role	Notes
1998	Nathan Grimm	Extra	
1999	Snow Falling on Cedars	Kazuo Miyamoto	
2001	The Fast and the Furious	Johnny Tran	
2001	The Fence	"Lucky" Chang	
2002	Die Another Day	Tang Ling Zao	
2008	The Fifth Commandment	Chance Templeton	Also producer and writer
2008	Alone in the Dark II	Edward Carnby	Also associate producer
2009	Beyond Remedy	Dr. Lee	
2009	Ninja Assassin	Takeshi	
2011	Remigration	Jonathan Park	
2012	The Man with the Iron Fists	Zen Yi, The X-Blade	
2013	Olympus Has Fallen	Kang Yeonsak	
2019	Alita: Battle Angel	Master Clive Lee	
2020	Jiu Jitsu	Captain Sand	
2023	Tetris	Bank Manager	
2025	L2: Empuraan	Shenlong Shen	Indian-Malayalam language film
TBA	L3: Azrael	Shenlong Shen	Indian-Malayalam language film
TBA	Somebody's Girl	Eric	

List of television credits
Year	Title	Role	Notes
1997	Another World	Assistant District Attorney	1 Episode
2000	Any Day Now	Tuan	Episode: "The Dust of Life"
2001	The Division		Episode: "Partners in Crime"
2005	Alias	Kazu Tamazaki	Episode: "Authorized Personnel Only"
2005	Boston Legal	Troi Ran	Episode: "'Til We Meat Again"
2006	CSI	Mr. Hsing	Episode: "Toe Tags"
2011	Futurestates	Jonathan Park	Episode: "Remigration"
2013	Hawaii Five-O	Han Ji-Woon	Episode: "Olelo Pa'a (The Promise)"
2014–2016	Marco Polo	Kaidu	Main role
2017	Prison Break	Ja	Recurring cast: season 5
2023	Wu-Tang: An American Saga	Cyrus	Episode: "Liquid Swords"

List of video game credits
Year	Title	Role	Notes
2006	Scarface: The World is Yours		
