= First Shift (film) =

2024 crime film

- Theatrical release poster
- Directed by: Uwe Boll
- Written by: Uwe Boll
- Produced by: Michael Roesch; Ari Taub; Anthony Argento; Patrick Grzanna
- Starring: Gino Anthony Pesi; Kristen Renton; Garry Pastore; James McMenamin; Willy C. Carpenter; Brandi Bravo; Daniel Sauli
- Cinematography: Mathias Neumann
- Edited by: Ethan Maniquis
- Music by: Jessica de Rooij; Hendrik Nölle
- Production companies: Event Film; Hit and Run Productions; Rollin Studios; Public Disply of Affection
- Distributed by: Quiver Distribution
- Release dates: April 10, 2024 (IDIF); August 30, 2024 (U.S. and Canada)
- Running time: 89 minutes
- Country: United States
- Language: English

First Shift is a 2024 American crime drama film produced, written, and directed by the German filmmaker Uwe Boll. It stars Gino Anthony Pesi as a lone NYPD officer who is forced to team up with a new recruit, played by Kristen Renton, on his next duty dealing with violent crimes in New York City. James McMenamin, Willy C. Carpenter, Brandi Bravo, and Daniel Sauli are featured in supporting roles.

First Shift marks Boll's formal return to filmmaking after eight years on hiatus from the industry, during which time he set up a now-defunct upscale restaurant in Vancouver and directed a documentary. Filming on First Shift, which consisted of a non-union crew, began and completed in March 2023, on location in New York City. Despite legal hurdles over allegations of unfair labor practices committed on set (which Boll denied), it premiered in his native Germany at the Independent Days International Filmfest on April 10, 2024, and had a simultaneous release in the United States and Canada on August 30, 2024.

== Premise ==
Set in New York City, First Shift follows a lone, veteran NYPD officer from Brooklyn who reluctantly agrees to team up with a new female recruit from Atlanta. They spend the next 12 hours patrolling the city's dangerous streets dealing with violent crimes, one of which revolves around a mob killing that endangers their lives.

== Cast ==
- Gino Anthony Pesi as Deo Russo, a lone NYPD detective from Brooklyn
- Kristen Renton as Angela Dutton, a detective from Atlanta Police Department, who was recently transferred to NYPD and is paired with the reluctant Russo
- James McMenamin as Paul
- Daniel Sauli as Jack
- Tia Dionne Hodge as Lieutenant Walden
- Garry Pastore as Valenti
- Brandi Bravo as Sandra

== Production ==
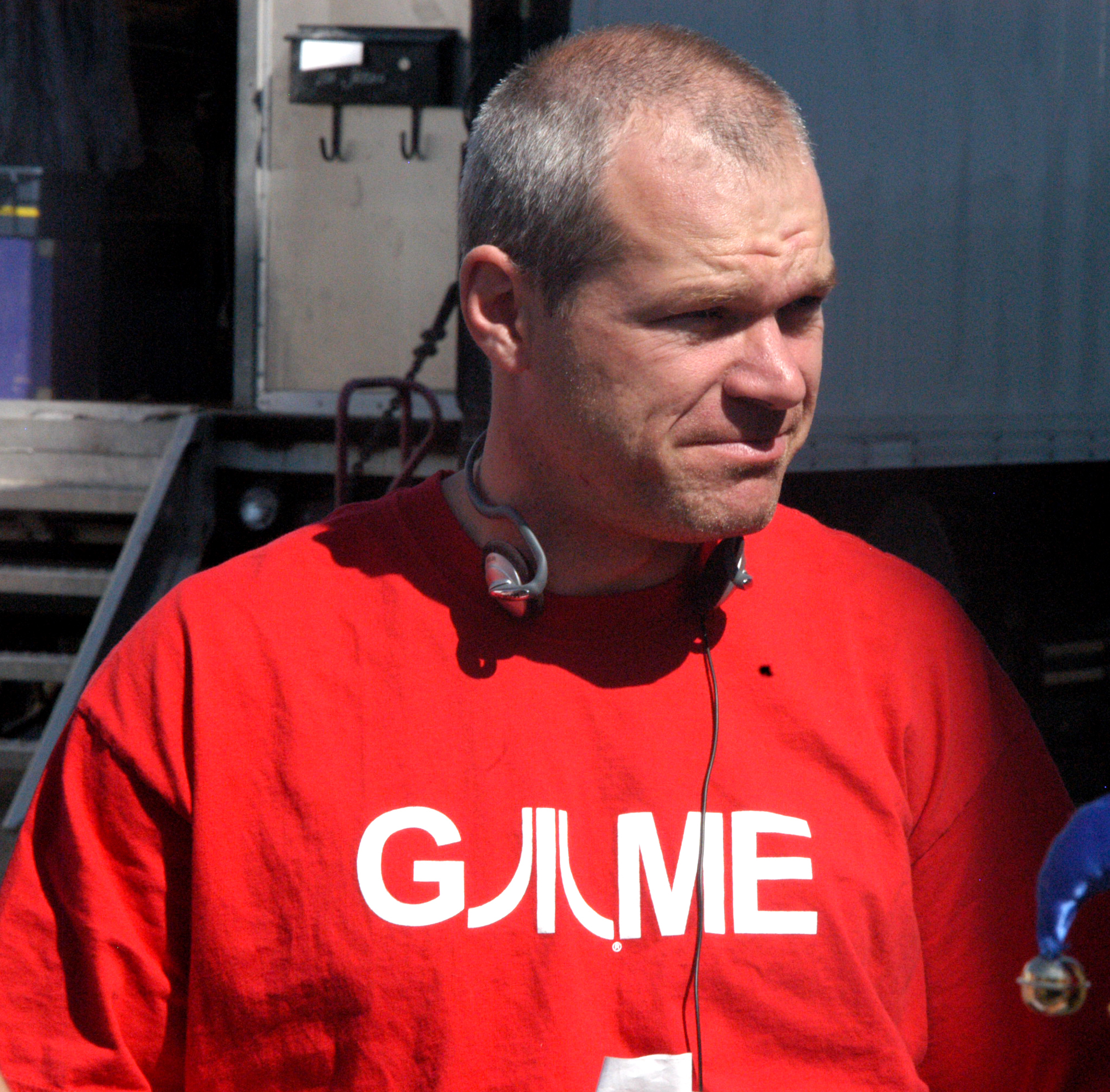
Uwe Boll (2005)

On February 16, 2023, Variety reported that German filmmaker Uwe Boll was set to begin principal photography on the crime drama First Shift in March, his first feature in at least five years, following Rampage: President Down (2016). On March 31, 2023, Hollywood Reporter announced that Boll had finished filming in New York City and had entered post-production in Los Angeles, California. First Shift marks Boll's formal return to filmmaking after serving brief stints as a restaurateur and documentarian: following President Down, he went on hiatus to set up an upscale restaurant in Vancouver (now defunct) as well as direct a low-budget German documentary about the Hanau shootings. Variety noted that First Shift was one of three projects Boll had lined up for production since his return, intended to be filmed ahead of "a South Africa-set thriller" and an Eliot Ness biopic. The film follows "two mismatched New York City cops on their first day as partners", with Gino Anthony Pesi and Kristen Renton cast as the police. THR said that First Shift would be a manifestation of Boll's "kinder, gentler side" as a director: he has described it as the least violent film in his body of work. As such, he incorporated a subplot in which Pesi and Renton's characters take a lost dog (played by Pesi's pet dog Tango) for a ride in their patrol car, thinking that "people need a more feel-good film right now". Per a July 23, 2024 Collider article, Boll also stated he wanted to highlight the repercussions of developing intimate partnerships "in a world as stressful as law enforcement".

=== Controversy ===
THR reported that the International Alliance of Theatrical Stage Employees (IATSE) had filed a complaint with the National Labor Relations Board (NLRB) against the filmmakers for unfair labor practices allegedly committed on set. A small group of crew members alleged that the filmmakers had jeopardized their safety with a prop gun line producer Ari Taub had unexpectedly brought to the set. This, however, "ended without incident" after Boll managed to convince the union that rubber guns were used in addition to gunshots utilizing a mix of practical and digital effects, a claim corroborated by his German executive producer Michael Roesch. The complainants then alleged that the filmmakers had threatened them into not participating on a strike in an effort to unionize the film, contrary to NLRB's provisions, hence the IATSE's filing. Boll dismissed the accusations as "completely baseless", believing these were done in retaliation by the complainants after their demands to turn the film into a union production were not met. Gino Anthony Pesi and Kristen Renton also denied an allegation of on-set animal abuse involving Pesi's dog in an email sent to PETA, which received the complaint from an anonymous source. Taub has said he intends to sue the complainants.

== Release ==
Variety reported on October 30, 2023, that Quiver Distribution had secured the distribution rights to the film for the American and Canadian markets and "selected international territories" when Kinostar (which handled its international sales) was to sell it at the American Film Market (AFM). First Shift had its world premiere at the Independent Days International Filmfest in Germany, on April 10, 2024. The film was released in theaters, on-demand, and on digital simultaneously on August 30, 2024. The film was released on Paramount+ in December 2024, debuting at number 2.

== Future ==
By October 2025, two sequels, First Shift: Vengeance and First Shift: Redemption, wrapped principal photography in New York City, while a First Shift television series is in development.
