= Citizen Vigilante =

2026 action-thriller film by Uwe Boll

- Theatrical release poster
- Directed by: Uwe Boll
- Written by: Uwe Boll
- Produced by: Uwe Boll; Boris Veličan
- Starring: Armie Hammer; Costas Mandylor
- Cinematography: Uwe Boll
- Edited by: Ethan Maniquis
- Music by: Rodolfo Matulich
- Production companies: Event Film; Borvel Film
- Distributed by: Quiver Distribution
- Release date: June 19, 2026
- Running time: 89 minutes
- Countries: Croatia; Germany
- Language: English
- Budget: US$2 million

Citizen Vigilante is a 2026 action-thriller film produced, written, and directed by Uwe Boll. It stars Armie Hammer as Michael Sanders, a vigilante enraged by the breakdown of law and order who targets criminals and rapists, most of whom are migrants, and the corrupt officials who protect them.

The independently produced film was released in select theaters in North America and digitally on June 19, 2026, with a British release being approved in early July. It received negative reviews from critics, who criticized its plot, execution and perceived anti-immigrant message, but was praised by several right-wing and far-right figures.

In Germany, the FSK assigned an “18+” rating for theatrical release. For home video, the FSK refused to assign a rating even after a third review, as stricter guidelines apply to home video. Elon Musk subsequently promoted the film and made it available for free on X for two days. The film was released in Germany on October 7 as a stream on Amazon Prime and Apple TV.

== Plot ==
In an unnamed European city, a young mother is fatally stabbed in front of her son by a passing migrant. A news report states that parents are afraid to let their children play outside and that women avoid going out after dark.

Michael Sanders is a former U.S. Army officer who moved to Europe after inheriting his estranged father's real estate business. He secretly operates as the Vigilante Citizen, a ruthless vigilante who targets those who have escaped justice. While much of the public praises his actions, the police, led by Interpol's Chief Henry, are determined to arrest him.

After killing a group of racketeers, Sanders confronts several fare-dodging thugs on a bus. He pays their fares so the journey can continue, but lectures them about the impact of their behavior on society. Later, at a hospital, Sanders visits Elsa, a rape victim who was severely beaten during her attack. He offers her a choice: pursue justice through the courts, with no guarantee of success, or endorse his intervention. She chooses to support him. Henry later asks Elsa for a description of her visitor, but she deliberately provides one that does not match Sanders. During a meeting with his business manager, Sanders orders the eviction of non-paying tenants and vows to oppose government efforts to seize vacant properties for migrant housing.

Suspicious of Sanders, Henry surveils a nightclub Sanders frequents. There, he watches Sanders switch the drinks of two men with the drugged beverages they had intended for their dates. Henry collects a drinking glass that Sanders used to obtain his DNA. After linking Sanders to the vigilante, Henry leads a Special Intervention Unit team to apprehend him. Sanders barricades himself inside an armored container and warns the officers to leave. The officers open fire, prompting Sanders to kill them before making his escape. An explosive booby-trap injures Henry. A subsequent news report suggests that rising crime and associated costs may necessitate a reassessment of migration policies.

Sanders later meets a teenage rape victim whose six migrant attackers were released without punishment because Judge Reinhold, the presiding judge in the case, considered them to be victims too (citing their difficulties integrating into society). The teenage victim tells Sanders that she has been denied justice. Sanders kills Reinhold and stages it as a suicide. The police later link the incident to multiple unexplained deaths involving judges.

While walking through a park, Sanders encounters the same thugs from the bus harassing a man. He crushes the hands of the two male assailants before warning them never to repeat their behavior. Sanders visits the home of Yusuf, one of the rapists, and takes him and his family hostage. As Yusuf's relatives excuse his actions and blame the victim, Sanders orders Yusuf to summon his accomplices to the apartment. Once they arrive, Sanders executes Yusuf, his family, and the other attackers.

Sanders calls the hospitalized Henry and tells him to inform the government that the public will not tolerate a takeover by the woke left and Islamist extremists that will destroy democracy. He warns that the government must stop it or the people will do so themselves. Henry arranges to address the press if the prime minister will not listen to him.

At home, the teenage victim learns that her attackers are dead and smiles in satisfaction. A scrambled video message from Sanders is broadcast, declaring that his work will continue until the citizens learn to defend themselves.

== Cast ==
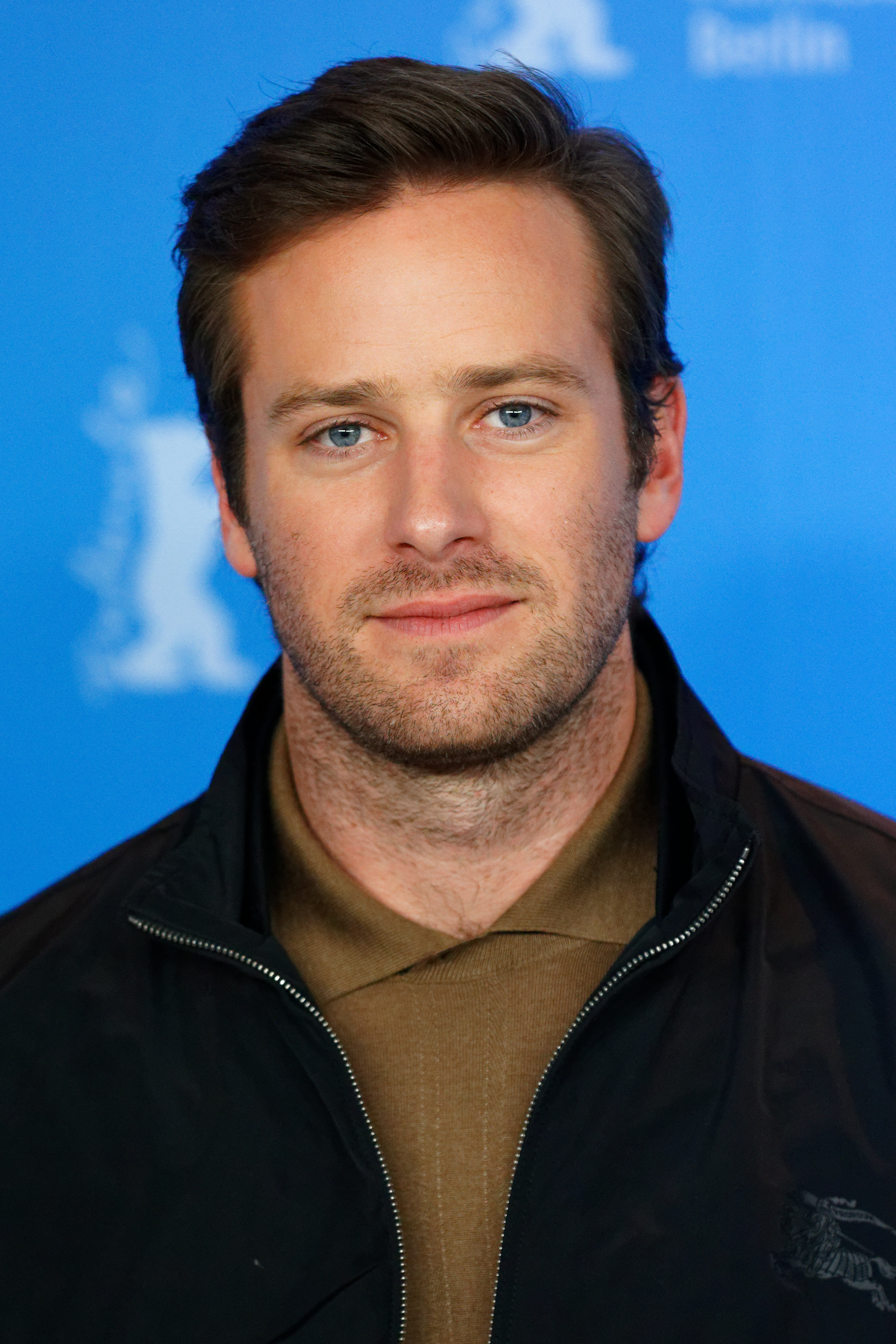
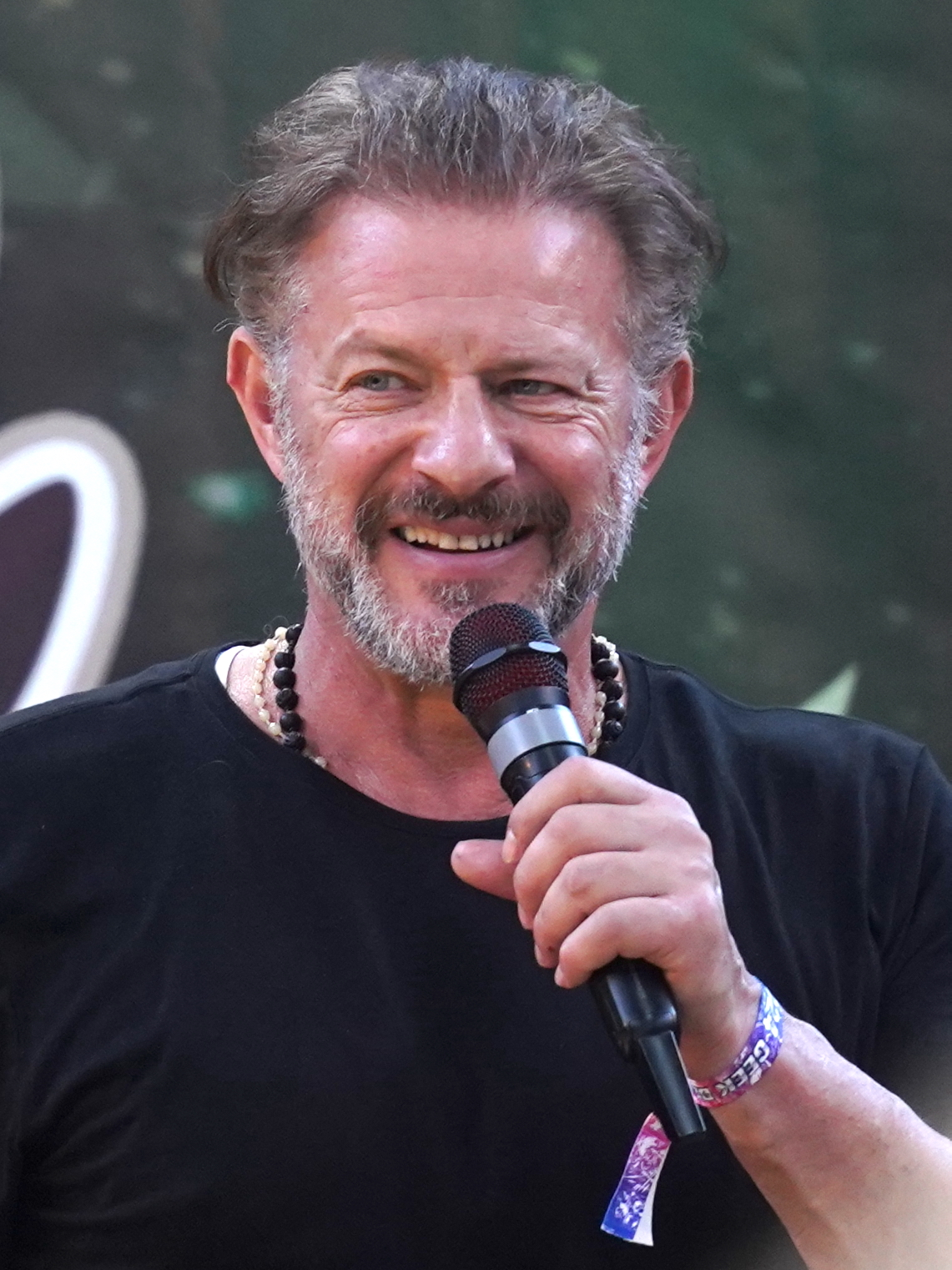
Armie Hammer (pictured in 2017) and Costas Mandylor (2024)
- Armie Hammer as Michael Sanders
- Costas Mandylor as Interpol Regional Chief Henry
- Désirée Giorgetti as Elsa
- Steffen Mennekes as Manager Owen
- Neb Chupin as SWAT Leader Pierre
- Mukit Abdul Hamid as Yusuf
- Fares Mongy as Ibrahim, Yusuf's father
- Hila Harush as Dehlia, Yusuf's sister
- Helen Al Janabi as Sarna, Yusuf's mother
- Dora Dimić Rakar as Raped Girl
- Tvrtko Jurić as Raped Girl's Father
- Roni Lepej as Judge Reinhold
- Vjekoslav Katusin as Mafia Boss
- Uwe Boll as Newscast Director (uncredited)

== Production ==
In January 2025, it was announced that an independent thriller film produced, written, and directed by Uwe Boll titled The Dark Knight was in pre-production, with Armie Hammer cast in the lead role. Principal photography began on January 27, 2025, in Zagreb, Croatia, with Mathias Neumann serving as the cinematographer. In February, Costas Mandylor joined the cast. Filming wrapped on February 15, 2025. Warner Bros. sent Boll a cease-and-desist letter regarding the use of the title The Dark Knight. In April 2025, the title was changed to Citizen Vigilante. Boll has described the film as being in the tradition of "revenge" films like Death Wish and Dirty Harry.

In an interview with The Hollywood Reporter, Hammer stated he received the offer to star in the film from Boll in 2024, and that it was the first offer he received in five years following his sexual assault allegations and the end of his professional career. Hammer stated he "would have done a fucking cat food commercial" and needed work. It was later reported he was offered "in the ballpark of $250,000" for the role.

Boll said he had to ask "hundreds" of actors before he finally found ones who were willing to portray the Muslim family in the final part of the movie.

=== Background and inspiration ===
Boll said he was inspired by the "social injustices" of a 2016 court case in Hamburg, from which a group of teenagers "walked free without any penalty" after they received suspended sentences for gang-raping a 14-year-old girl and leaving her for dead. He said the case made him "so mad" he started writing Citizen Vigilante. The film concludes with a dedication to the "rape victims in Europe who were betrayed by our legal system".

== Release ==
In February 2026, Quiver Distribution acquired North American distribution rights to the film, releasing it in the United States on 19 June 2026.

The film was initially denied an age certification in Germany for promoting vigilantism, banning it from wide distribution and advertisement, though it was not put on the "Index" and can therefore be legally bought by adults in specialized stores. In response, Boll publicly argued that the board used "youth protection" as a pretext to suppress the film due to its focus on migration-linked crime in Europe. In an interview with The Daily Telegraph, Boll stated: "I hired a lawyer to complain about it, but we lost in a six-two vote as I was told that the film was inciting violence against migrants."

On June 25, with Boll's endorsement, the film was made freely accessible on X for 48 hours on Elon Musk's account. Musk further publicized this release with several posts praising the film; he suggested that efforts to ban the film had instead boosted its reach, specifically mentioning the Streisand effect. The European Conservative assessed that Musk had turned "a German regulatory decision into a transatlantic phenomenon" and "presented as a new case of European censorship".

Days later, Quiver Distribution, which already held rights to the film in North America, bought worldwide distribution rights, excluding the United Kingdom, German-speaking territories, South Korea, and Taiwan. On 3 July 2026, the British Board of Film Classification approved the film for a 2026 release with an 18 classification, uncut. In Australia, the film was given an MA 15+ classification from the Australian Classification Board on 6 July 2026.

Following a third review on July 7, 2026, the FSK assigned an 18+ rating to the film's theatrical release, allowing it to be shown in German theaters; however, distribution through other means is still restricted.

== Reception ==
=== Commercial response ===
As of 30 June 2026, the film was the No. 1 digital purchase on both the Apple TV Store and Amazon Prime Video after being promoted on X by Elon Musk. On 30 June 2026, eleven days after the film's release, Boll said that it had made "around US$600,000" against a production budget of US$2 million.

=== Critical response ===
On the review aggregator website Rotten Tomatoes, 13% of 23 critics' reviews are positive, with an average rating of 2.1/10.

Prior to its promotion by Elon Musk, Citizen Vigilante received very few reviews from major publications. Of these, they were overwhelmingly negative.

Todd Gilchrist of Variety described the film as "astonishingly bad" and a "violent, incoherent, morally bankrupt slice of exploitation", with Hammer's character being as "xenophobic and entitled as the broadest American stereotype" who delivers "self-righteous monologues". He wrote that Hammer displayed "little of that spark" of his earlier charisma, and Boll's script as giving the character "prejudiced screeds". Gilchrist also commented that the film felt "like the writer-director-producer is deliberately sabotaging his star Armie Hammer, whose intended comeback can only be harmed by this project".

Rebecca Onion of Slate called the film "one of the most disturbing movies I've seen in recent memory, for its reception as much as its content", with the film "perfectly [hitting] the zeitgeist for X-posting right-wingers who are single-issue agitators on the subject of migration". Onion concludes that, when juxtaposed with Boll's previous film Run, Sanders comes off as "irrational" and a "bit of a freak" rather than heroic, and that Citizen Vigilante—with the exception of the film's violent climax—"doesn't quite do what those right-wingers want it to do."

Giancarlo Sopo of National Review, noting Boll's previous range of exploitation films that ranged from having "no point" to reaching for the "current loudest resentment", described the lead character as one that "has no wound, no soul, and no politics worth the name". He stated that despite its "reactionary provocations", Citizen Vigilante should not be considered a "conservative film" as it was "a Jacobin fantasy wearing right-wing talking points as drag." The review found merit in Hammer's performance, but commented that instead of giving the actor a comeback, the film "extends his exile".

The German Rolling Stone called Citizen Vigilante a "modern take on Death Wish" and argued that the film's subject matter had turned Boll into "a pillar of right-wing culture." In his review for The Guardian, Peter Bradshaw called the film a "very cheap, incoherent and embarrassingly badly acted schlocker" and dismissed comparisons with Death Wish, Dirty Harry, or Taxi Driver, stating that Citizen Vigilante lacked the "passion, style, wit, purpose, vision and competent production values" these other films possessed.

John Walker writing for Kotaku derided it as "a series of scenes", that could hardly be called a movie, referred to a scene taking place in a brothel as "one of the most unintentionally, hilariously awkward scenes of all time", and noted its failure to even promote its "disgustingly racist and Islamophobic" message through its lackluster quality. Additionally, he argued the movie "unambiguously and unironically" called for killings of immigrants and their families.

Armond White of National Review and Robert Scucci of Giant Freakin Robot both called it "a straight-faced satire", with the latter saying it is "actually a blatant criticism of [the] very mindset" of those who view Sanders as a hero. Scucci says that Sanders, a U.S. citizen living in Europe, is himself "a violent immigrant", and that while his goal to "protect women from being assaulted", he is "complicit in the same kind of societal degradation that he’s profiting from while allegedly fighting against it", due to his ownership of multiple properties that house brothels.

Right-wing commentator Douglas Murray, writing for The Free Press, called it an "ugly film" that "can't be avoided, and it shouldn't be", approving it as indicting "European elites" but warned it "could stoke intemperate rage along with righteous anger".

Newsweek compared the right-wing leanings of Citizen Vigilante to the much more progressive leanings of Supergirl (2026), describing it as a "culture war double feature" while criticizing both films' message of morality: "In both films, killing is rebranded as a burden the morally awake agree to shoulder... What both films actually worship is the sovereign individual—figures exempt from accountability because the world is too broken for accountability to function."

Jurica Pavičić, writing for the Croatian news outlet Jutarnji List, described it as "the most fascist movie filmed in Europe since 1945". Writing for Index.hr, Igor Tomljanović compared the film to Uwe Boll's earlier film, also filmed in Croatia, Auschwitz, which he said was described as torture porn. He went on to write that like in Auschwitz, Boll "took a sensitive social topic and turned it into a cheap, exploitative spectacle that speaks to people's base passions and in a way serves to fulfill the wet dreams of peaceful citizens."

=== Online response ===
Boll's posting of the full-length film on X gained 5 million views, while Elon Musk's posting of the film garnered more than 10.5 million views. Slate noted that the film was popular among right-wingers on X. Several far-right online personalities also praised the film, including Libs of TikTok, Jack Posobiec, and white nationalist Nick Fuentes. Boll also appeared in interviews with white supremacist Jared Taylor and British far-right extremist Mark Collett.

== Video game ==
On July 17, 2026, a video game tie-in, Citizen Vigilante: The Video Game, was released for the PlayStation 5. A single-player first-person shooter, it was developed solely by German developer and publisher Daniel Wengenroth, under the name Polygon Art Studios.

== Possible sequel ==
Boll said he hopes the film generates enough money to allow him to produce Citizen Vigilante 2, eyeing a release in 2027. He said he has developed some concepts for the project, but added that a screenplay does not yet exist. When asked about Hammer's possible return, he expressed confidence that the actor would be interested in reprising the role. Variety contacted Hammer's representative for comment, but received no response.

In July 2026, a Puck article by Kim Masters reported that Hammer was attempting to distance himself from the film and quoted "a source close to Hammer" as saying that the actor had been dismayed by the finished product, which he found "hateful", "disgusting" and unlike what had been agreed upon. The source also said that for Hammer to agree to a sequel "it would have to be life-changing money". In a sit-down interview with Masters, Hammer said that he was not wealthy and needed the money. Boll disputed Puck's report, which he attributed to the film's polarizing nature, and said he and Hammer had a "great time" working together.

== See also ==
- List of vigilante films
- Run Hide Fight: Infidels – another 2026 action thriller criticized as promoting a pro-Israel and an anti-Islam stance.
