= Rampage 2 =

Rampage 2 may refer to:

- Rampage 2: Universal Tour, a 1999 video game
- Rampage: Capital Punishment, the sequel to the Uwe Boll film Rampage
