= Blackwoods (film) =

2001 film

- DVD cover
- Directed by: Uwe Boll
- Written by: Uwe Boll; Robert Dean Klein
- Produced by: Shawn Williamson
- Starring: Patrick Muldoon; Clint Howard; Keegan Connor Tracy
- Cinematography: Mathias Neumann
- Edited by: David Richardson
- Music by: Reinhard Besser
- Distributed by: Velocity Home Entertainment
- Release dates: 5 October 2001 (Hof International Film Festival); 3 September 2002
- Running time: 90 minutes
- Countries: Canada; Germany
- Language: English
- Budget: $3 million
- Box office: $1,500 (US only)

Blackwoods is a 2001 psychological thriller film, directed by Uwe Boll and starring Patrick Muldoon and Clint Howard. It is set in the titular Blackwoods.

== Plot ==
Matt Sullivan is haunted to the point of mental instability by his guilt over the death of a girl named Molly in a car crash he caused years ago. Driving drunk after an argument with his girlfriend, he was distracted by the car radio and fatally struck the girl as she crossed the road.

Years later, Matt takes his new girlfriend Dawn on a weekend trip to the Blackwoods of Colorado. During a stopover in a small town Matt and Dawn have lunch at a local diner, where he notices several of the locals staring oddly at the two of them. On the road, Matt is pulled over by Sheriff Harding, who asks Matt who he is and what he is doing passing through the town. After Matt explains about their weekend getaway, Sheriff Harding lets them go.

Matt checks into a local motel where he interacts with the debauched motel clerk and owner Greg, who tries to overcharge him for his room for the night. Later, after a wild session of sex, Dawn goes for a walk. While she is away a strange man with an axe comes into the motel room and attacks Matt, who escapes and calls the police. Sheriff Harding shows up and, after finding no one around, openly suspects Matt of having ulterior motives for visiting the Blackwoods, but without any hard evidence he cannot arrest him. Matt phones his friend Jim, telling him of Dawn's disappearance and asking for help before setting out to look for her.

In the woods, Matt is attacked and captured by a rural family, the Franklins, who restrain him and put on a mock trial to try him for the death of the young girl he killed years prior. Dawn emerges and reveals that she is the twin sister of Molly, and that she lured him here for revenge. Matt is found guilty by the Franklins, and is sentenced to be turned loose in the forest for the family to hunt down; he flees into the woods, his sanity weakening further as he goes.

Matt manages to ambush and kill two of the family members, Jack and John, pursuing him through the woods. Jim appears, having tracked Matt down, and tries to talk to his friend when Matt unexpectedly attacks and kills him, believing that he too is in league with the Franklin family. It is revealed that Dawn and the Franklins never existed, and that Matt's every interaction with them had been part of a delusion his guilt-ridden mind created to deal with the strain of his past.

Sheriff Harding follows Matt's tracks into the woods and to the old Franklin house, which is abandoned and in disrepair (confirming that Matt's "trial" was indeed a hallucination). The sheriff finds Jim's dead body and then chases after Matt. The chase ends with Matt running blindly into traffic and being killed by a speeding truck.

The final scene shows Sheriff Harding conversing with the waitress at the local diner, telling her how Matt's mental instability led to him experiencing this waking nightmare about Dawn and the Franklins.

== Cast ==
- Patrick Muldoon as Matt Sullivan
- Keegan Connor Tracy as Dawn / Molly
- Will Sanderson as Jim
- Michael Paré as Sheriff Harding
- Clint Howard as Greg / Motel Clerk
- Anthony Harrison as Tail Man / Dr. Kelly
- Matthew Walker as Pa Franklin
- Janet Wright as Ma Franklin
- Sean Campbell as Jack Franklin
- Ben Derrick as John Franklin
- Michael Eklund as Billy / Man
- Samantha Ferris as Waitress / Beth
- Patricia Dahlquist as Mrs. Sullivan

== Reception ==
=== Release ===
The film was released direct-to-video on September 3, 2002, in North America.

It has an 11% 'rotten' rating on Rotten Tomatoes. Until Rampage in 2009, this film was known as Uwe Boll's "best" film.

=== Critical response ===
Stephen Holden from The New York Times gave Blackwoods a positive review, describing it as "smarter and more diabolical than you could have guessed at the beginning."
