= Picco (film) =

- Film poster
- Directed by: Philip Koch
- Starring: Constantin von Jascheroff; Joel Basman
- Release date: 20 January 2010
- Running time: 105 minutes
- Country: Germany
- Language: German

Picco is a 2010 German psychological horror crime film directed by Philip Koch.

== Plot ==
"Picco" delves into the challenging life of Jakob, a troubled teenager incarcerated in a youth detention center. Within this environment, Jakob becomes enmeshed in a harsh social hierarchy, grappling with the brutal realities of life behind bars.

As Jakob navigates the violent dynamics of the institution, he forges alliances with fellow inmates in a bid to survive. However, escalating tensions and increasing brutality force Jakob to confront his moral compass, leading him to make difficult choices for his own endurance.

The film delves into themes of power, survival, and the corruption of authority within the juvenile justice system. Through its unflinching portrayal of confinement, "Picco" explores the psychological toll it takes on individuals and the lengths they go to preserve their humanity amidst adversity.

== Cast ==
- Constantin von Jascheroff as Kevin
- Joel Basman as Tommy
- Frederick Lau as Marc
- Martin Kiefer as Andy

== See also ==
- Stoic (2009)
