= Sausage factory =

Sausage factory may refer to:

- A factory which manufactures sausage.
- A legislative body, whose practices in creating law are often analogized to the goings on of a sausage factory.
- The Sausage Factory, a show on MTV.
- A slang name for an informal gathering of men, or with an overwhelming male predominance
