= First-run =

First-run may refer to:

- First-run syndication, the first broadcast of a television program after it is licensed for syndication
- First run (filmmaking), describing films that are newly released
- First Run, a stream in West Virginia
- First Run Features, an independent film distribution company based in New York City
- First Run Film Festival, a film festival presented by the Kanbar Institute of Film & Television
