= Special ed =

Special ed may refer to:

- Special education, a form of alternative education
- Special Ed (rapper), a New York-based rapper
- The Sausage Factory, a Canadian TV show (known as "Special Ed" in certain U.S. markets)
- Special Ed (Jim Florentine), a character on the TV show Crank Yankers
