= Ari Taub =

Ari Taub may refer to:

- Ari Taub (director) (born 1965), American movie director, producer, and editor
- Ari Taub (wrestler) (born 1971), Canadian Greco-Roman wrestler
