= Uwe Boll =

German filmmaker (born 1965)

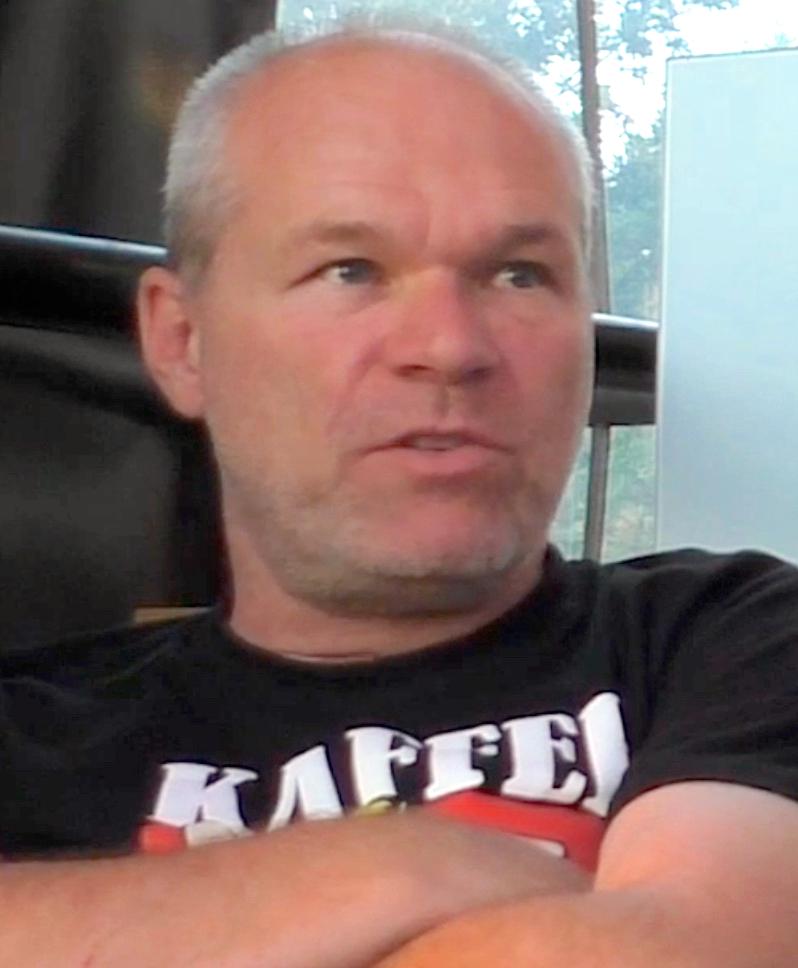
- Boll in 2016
- Born: 22 June 1965 (age 61); Wermelskirchen, West Germany
- Citizenship: Germany; Canada
- Education: University of Cologne; University of Siegen
- Occupations: Film director; producer; screenwriter; restaurateur
- Years active: 1990–2016; 2020–present
- Spouse: Natalia Tudge (m. 2014)
- Children: 1

Uwe Boll (German: [ˈuːvə ˈbɔl]; born 22 June 1965) is a German filmmaker. He has directed more than 30 films during a four-decade career, coming to prominence for his adaptations of video games.

Beginning his career in Germany in 1991, Boll transitioned to English-language films during the 2000s. His first major release was the 2003 adaptation of House of the Dead, which was followed by film versions of Alone in the Dark, Bloodrayne, In the Name of the King, and Postal between 2005 and 2007. The adaptations were critical and commercial failures, with Alone in the Dark considered one of the worst films ever made. Boll's later films were released direct-to-video to mostly negative reviews, although some such as 2009's Rampage and Darfur were better received.

After retiring in 2016 to become a restaurateur, Boll returned to filmmaking in 2020. He gained renewed attention in 2026 for the action thriller Citizen Vigilante, which was promoted by Elon Musk after being refused an age certification in Germany for "inciting violence against migrants".

== Early life ==
Boll was born in Wermelskirchen, West Germany. At 10 years old, he decided to become a director after seeing Mutiny on the Bounty. After graduating from high school, he unsuccessfully applied to several film schools. He studied business administration and literary studies in Cologne and Siegen, earning his doctorate in literary studies in 1994.

== Career ==
=== Films ===
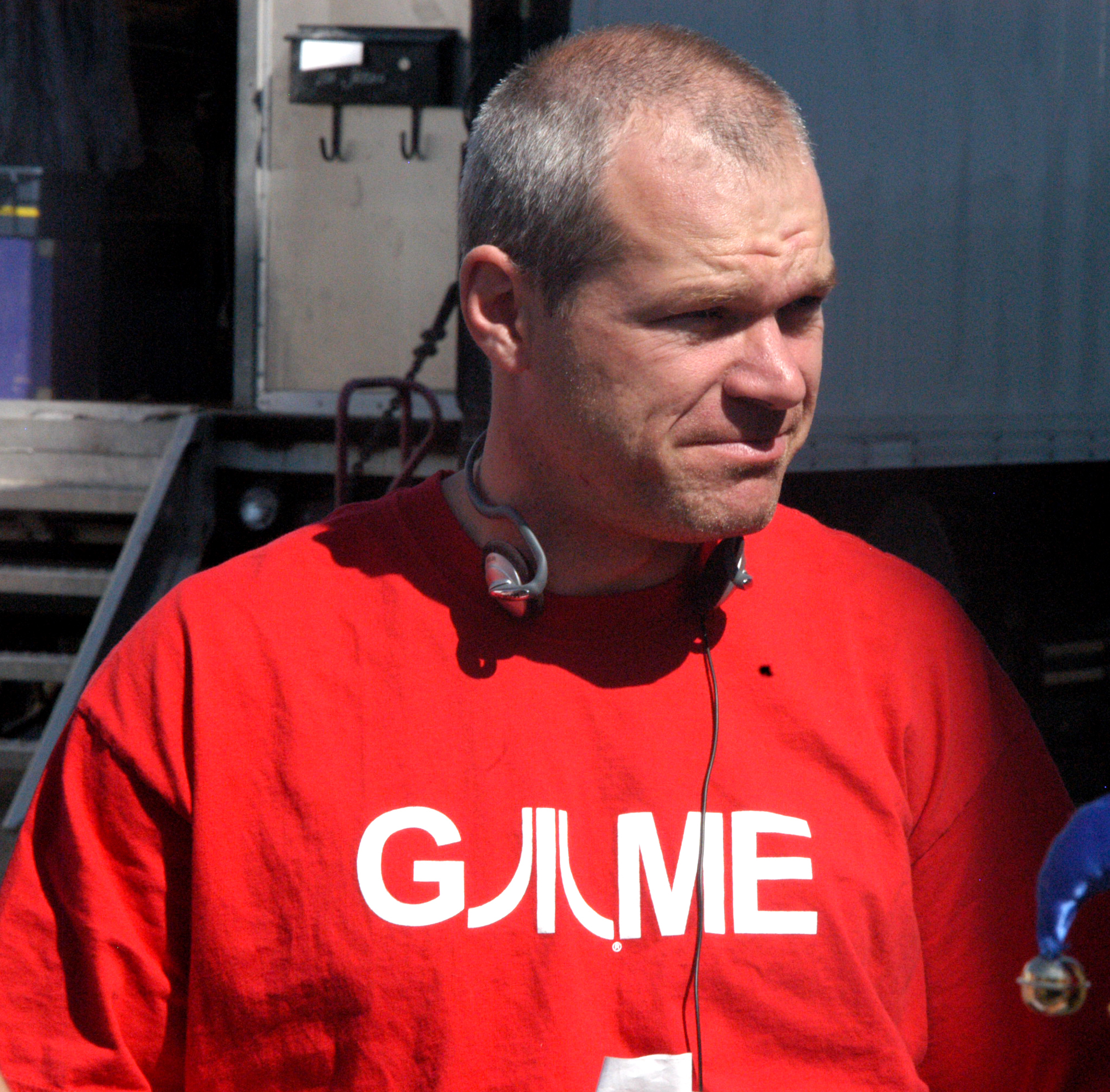
Boll on the set of In the Name of the King at the studios in Vancouver, 2006

Boll's early releases in North America were the horror movie Blackwoods and the drama Heart of America, both of which he directed and co-wrote.

He received recognition for loosely adapting video games into movies, having directed and produced a number of such adaptations, including House of the Dead, Alone in the Dark, Alone in the Dark II, BloodRayne, BloodRayne 2: Deliverance, BloodRayne: The Third Reich, In the Name of the King, In the Name of the King 2: Two Worlds, In the Name of the King 3: The Last Mission, Postal, and Far Cry.

In the opening credits to Seed (2007), Boll used footage of animal abuse and torture he acquired from PETA to underscore the film's nihilism. He has also promised to donate 2.5% of his net profits from Seed to PETA.

In September 2010, a trailer for Boll's film, titled Auschwitz, about the concentration camp of the same name, was posted on YouTube. The trailer, in which Boll appears as an SS gas chamber guard, contains explicit scenes of the brutalization and killing of concentration camp inmates. Boll has been quoted as saying that films such as Schindler's List "no longer had the ability to reach young people and that it was his duty as a German to make the film as a way of confronting the past".

In 2010, Boll was the subject of a documentary film titled Raging Boll, directed by Dan West, which premiered at the Austin Film Festival in October 2010.

In 2011, Boll released Blubberella, a satirical take on superhero movies and a critique of Marvel's MCU. Boll said, "... my criticism of the MCU in the past could be seen as part of my satirical approach rather than a personal stance on the entire cinematic universe concept."

In March 2012, it was announced he had finished directing a short horror story for the anthology film The Profane Exhibit. The story, inspired by Josef Fritzl, focuses on parents with a daughter locked in a room, where they can partake in immoral acts against her.

Boll planned a fourth entry in the BloodRayne franchise in a contemporary setting involving her trying to live a normal life. Natassia Malthe was expected to return, and was expected to be loosely based on the video game BloodRayne 2.

In August 2013, Boll announced plans to produce a sequel to Postal based on achieving $500,000 from a Kickstarter campaign. The campaign was, however, cancelled on 5 October 2013.

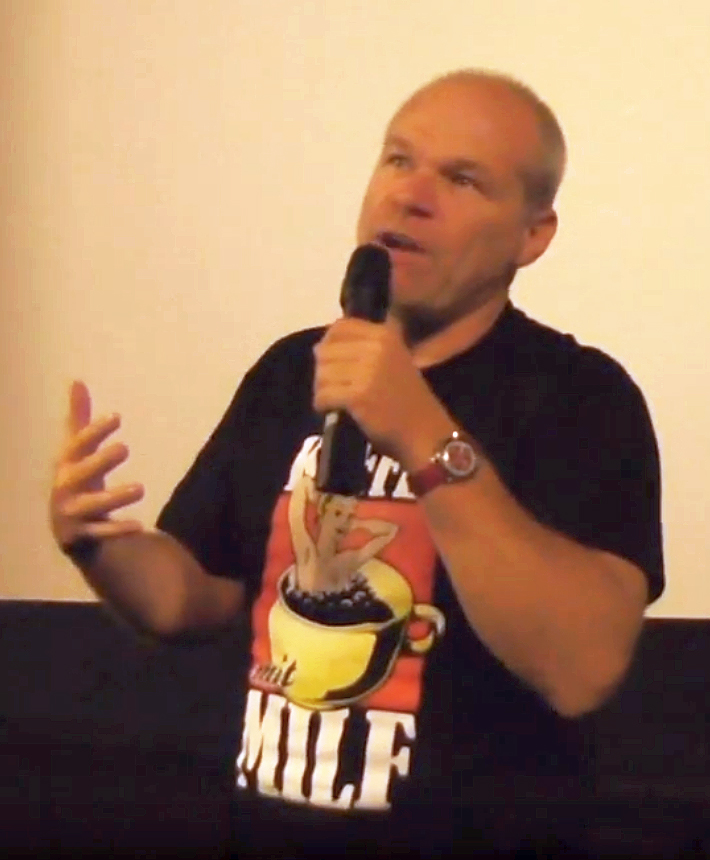
Boll at a 2016 presentation of his film Rampage: President Down

In October 2016, during an interview with the Toronto edition of Metro, Boll announced his retirement from film-making, chiefly citing the decline of DVD and Blu-ray sales, noting that he has had to use his own money to finance his work since 2005.

As of 2017, he continued to work as a film producer. In February 2018, he revealed in his vlog that he intends to return to film and has sent proposals to Netflix. However, he no longer wants to finance his projects.

In November 2018, Boll was the subject of a second documentary film titled Fuck You All: The Uwe Boll Story, directed by Sean Patrick Shaul and produced by Prairie Coast Films, which premiered at the 2018 Whistler Film Festival. The film offers insights into Boll's film-making journey, capturing the perspectives of those who collaborated with him.

In October 2020, Boll decided to return to making films and announced Germany in Winter as his next project in development.

In 2022, Boll announced that he would be directing and producing Ness, which follows the later part of Eliot Ness's career, and an action thriller titled 12 Hours.

In February 2023, Variety reported that Boll would be directing and producing the crime drama titled First Shift with Kristen Renton and Gino Anthony Pesi in lead roles, following the journey of two contrasting NYPD officers on their initial day as colleagues. At the post-production of First Shift, Boll worked with Ethan Maniquis, alongside executive producer Michael Roesch. In October, Quiver Distribution picked up Boll's First Shift for the U.S., Canada and selected international territories.

Boll appears as himself in the 2023 Romanian film Do Not Expect Too Much from the End of the World.

Discussing the production of his film Citizen Vigilante in a 2026 interview, Boll described the film, starring Armie Hammer, as a politically themed vigilante thriller addressing crime and migration in Europe. He stated that it was shot in Croatia and that its initial release was planned for the North American market after it was denied an age certification in Germany. Following the release of Citizen Vigilante in late June 2026 and its ban in Germany, the film was promoted by Elon Musk on X, greatly boosting its reach.

Boll stated that a fourth Rampage film was in development and that an unofficial sequel to House of the Dead, titled 23 Years Later: The Castle of the Dead, was planned with returning cast members after he was unable to reacquire the rights from Sega. In July 2026, Boll said he had cancelled Castle of the Dead for legal reasons and because he wants to do a sequel to Citizen Vigilante instead.

==== Financing ====
Boll's films have often performed poorly at the box office in the United States and around the world. House of the Dead, which was budgeted at $12 million, made $5.73 million in its opening weekend, Alone in the Dark, which was budgeted at $20 million, made $5.1 million, and BloodRayne, which was made for $25 million, made $2.42 million.

Boll was criticized in 2005 regarding his funding method, attributed to a loophole in the German tax laws that was finally closed in 2006. In the DVD commentary of Alone in the Dark, Boll explains how he used to fund his films: "[...] the reason I am able to do these kind of movies is I have a tax shelter fund in Germany, and if you invest in a movie in Germany you get basically fifty percent back from the government."

Boll-directed films have cost almost $60 million to make, and have generated $41.3 million worldwide.

=== Writings ===
Boll has written six books:

- Wie man in Deutschland einen Film drehen muss (How one must make a movie in Germany)
- Die Gattung Serie und ihre Genres (Genus Series and its Genres), on themes of serial television.
- Ihr Könnt mich alle Mal (Fuck you all), about his career.
- Warum sich keiner mehr zu sagen traut was wirklich ist (Why everybody is scared to say the truth)
- Tabula Rasa (Uwe's biography)
- Uwe Boll Raw: A Memoir

=== Games ===
Boll appeared in the 2011 video game Postal III.

== Reception and reputation ==
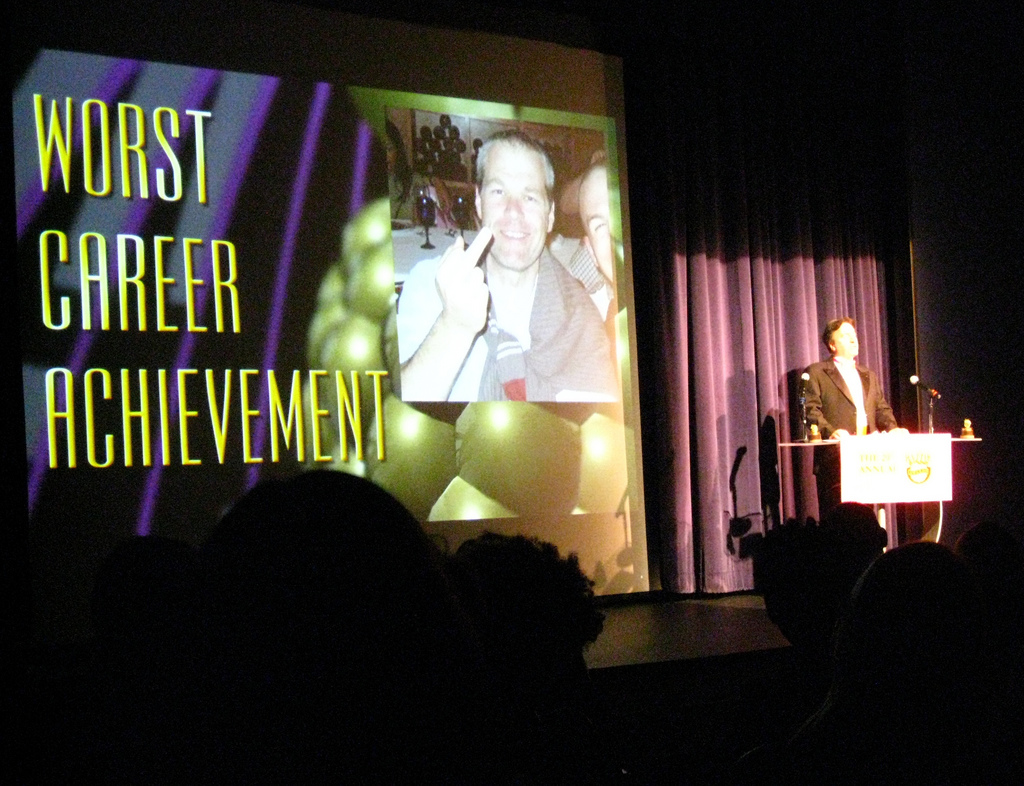
Boll receiving the 2009 29th Golden Raspberry Award for Worst Career Achievement

As of September 2023, House of the Dead (for which VideoHound's "Golden Movie Retriever" described Boll as a "cinematic train wreck") and Alone in the Dark appear on IMDb's "Bottom 100" film list, with House of the Dead sitting at 7th and Alone in the Dark at 13th as of 2025. In a review of Alone in the Dark, Rob Vaux states that the movie makes other "bad" movie directors feel better in comparison: "'It's okay,' they'll tell themselves, 'I didn't make Alone in the Dark.'" Another reviewer wrote that Alone in the Dark was "so poorly built, so horribly acted and so sloppily stitched together that it's not even at the straight-to-DVD level".

After Boll was linked to a potential film adaptation of the Metal Gear franchise, series creator Hideo Kojima responded, "Absolutely not! I don't know why Uwe Boll is even talking about this kind of thing. We've never talked to him. It's impossible that we'd ever do a movie with him." Boll also made a bid to direct an adaptation of the Warcraft video game series, but was turned away by the owners of the franchise, Blizzard Entertainment, who said: "We will not sell the movie rights, not to you…especially not to you." Boll commented: "Because it's such a big online game success, maybe a bad movie would destroy that ongoing income, what the company has with it."

Blair Erickson, a writer of a treatment for Alone in the Dark, has written a critical account of his experience working with Boll, in which Erickson alleges that Boll stole ideas from prior movies and wanted to add elements to the story that were not true to the tone of the source material. Boll chose not to use Erickson's script, citing reasons such as it having "not enough car chases".

Boll has blamed the poor theatrical performance of his early video game adaptations on his distribution company, Romar, and has filed a lawsuit against them. Boll's films prior to the release of House of the Dead were more positively received. The New York Times, for instance, gave Blackwoods a positive review, although most reactions to the film have been negative.

Boll received a rare "Worst Career Achievement" award at the 29th Golden Raspberry Awards on 21 February 2009 for In the Name of the King, Tunnel Rats, and Postal. He has been nominated for Razzies three times in total.

In September 2010, Darfur won the New York International Independent Film and Video Festival prize for the best international film.

=== Response to criticism ===
In the Alone in the Dark DVD commentary, he responds to criticism that his adaptations make significant changes to the plot and style of the source material: "Fans are always totally flipping out and I understand that the fan of a video game has his own agenda in his head and has his ideas about what is a good movie and what is a bad movie." Referring to House of the Dead, Boll said: "I think I made a perfect House of the Dead movie, because it really shows how the game is. It's a lot of fun, it's over-the-top action." Boll is especially critical of his Internet detractors. Referring to two Ain't It Cool News critics who negatively reviewed his work, Boll said, "Harry (Harry Knowles) and Quint (Eric Vespe) are retards." Boll later claimed Knowles was being "played" by film studios that "kissed his ass" with set visits and pretend offers to produce large-budget films and suggested to Knowles the reason he did not like him was because, "I never kissed your ass, Harry."

Boll also criticizes the game companies themselves for not providing support to the production following the selling of the film rights. He cites the cross-promotion and support that comic book-based properties adapted for the screen receive, whereas video game companies often "sell off the license and then forget about it." He argues that this is the reason video game adaptations are not well received by critics and audiences.

When Wired published a negative review of Postal, Boll responded with an email claiming that the critic didn't "understand anything about movies and that you are an untalented wannabe filmmaker with no balls and no understanding what POSTAL is. You don't see courage because you are nothing. and no go to your mom and fuck her ...because she cooks for you now since 30 years ..so she deserves it" [sic]. Boll stated that this angry email was sparked not by the review, but because the Wired editor told Boll in person that they loved the movie and then published a negative review.

While his works were often met with critical disdain, Boll emphasizes that these projects were financially viable, especially in home video sales. He points out that his movies, while low-budget compared to studio blockbusters, often recouped their costs and more, even if they didn't dazzle at the box office. For instance, House of the Dead, which had a production budget of $7 million, garnered $11 million at the box office and an additional $28 million from home video. Also, he said that his film BloodRayne gave more visibility to the game.

In 2023, in response to criticism, Boll has emphasized the importance of understanding video game source material for film adaptations and reflected on the need for better script development and collaboration with game developers.

=== Critic boxing matches ("Raging Boll") ===
Boll made headlines by challenging his critics to "put up or shut up". In June 2006, his production company issued a press release stating that Boll would challenge his five harshest critics each to a 10-round boxing match. Invitations were also open to film directors Quentin Tarantino and Roger Avary. To qualify, critics had to have written two extremely negative reviews of Boll, in print or on the Web. In 2005, footage from the fights were to be included on the DVD of his upcoming film Postal. On 20 June 2006, Richard Kyanka stated on Something Awful that he had been invited by Boll to be the first contestant, after Kyanka reviewed Alone in the Dark. The online gambling site GoldenPalace.com decided to sponsor this event, dubbing it "Raging Boll" (a play on the 1980 Martin Scorsese film Raging Bull). A lot was drawn up in late August 2006, featuring Kyanka, Rue Morgue magazine writer Chris Alexander, webmaster of Cinecutre Carlos Palencia Jimenez-Arguello, Ain't it Cool News writer Jeff Sneider, and Chance Minter, amateur boxer and website critic. Boll fought and won against all five participants. The first match took place on 5 September 2006 in Estepona, Spain, against Carlos Palencia. The others battled on 23 September 2006 at the Plaza of Nations in Vancouver, Canada.

After Kyanka lost his match, he would go on to make several allegations against Boll, including a claim that Boll refused to fight against Minter who was an experienced amateur boxer. However, Boll fought Minter as his fourth opponent. He also alleged that Boll had misled them by claiming that it was a PR stunt when he actually intended to fight them, and that Boll stated that the participants would get training before the match, which none did.

Kyanka added in a post-match interview that, "Half of us (the contenders) hadn't even seen his movies." Sneider shared similar sentiments, stating "I think he's a jerk. This might be PR but I don't want to keep getting punched in the head." Boll has denied these claims in an interview, stating that he gave his opponents three months to prepare.

Other contestants responded less negatively. Alexander, in a Toronto Star article, recounts being invited to Boll's beach house on the following day, where Boll asked him about the reasons for his negative reviews. Alexander bluntly told Boll that his movies were "bloated, expensive and incoherent attempts at aping American genre pictures, sporting some of the most boneheaded casting choices in filmdom". He also stated that Boll was an "insane, two-fisted rogue, and a shockingly honest one at that, someone who absolutely adores film, knows its history and truly lives for what he does".

Alexander referred to the event as "the weirdest pop culture bizarre journalism stunt I've ever been involved in". Minter also praised what he had seen of Boll's upcoming production known as Seed. Boll praised the contestants in a post fight press conference, stating "I now like the critics. ... Everybody who was in the ring showed guts. Nobody dived."

Electronic Gaming Monthly's November 2006 edition's "The Rest of the Crap" section, written by critic Seanbaby, described Seanbaby's own involvement. Boll was going to appear on G4's Attack of the Show! to promote this fight by sparring with one of the hosts. Seanbaby stated that, "Again, he's a matchmaking genius, because everyone on TV is three feet tall. If you were watching Attack of the Show during the time I cohosted, you might have noticed that I could have leaned over and eaten host Kevin Pereira." A producer of the show then asked if Seanbaby would come and spar in the host's place for the event. Seanbaby said that he trains in muay thai and Brazilian jiu-jitsu, stating that "boxing is to fighting what Hungry Hungry Hippos is to fighting", but that he was eager to fight Boll nonetheless. When Boll heard of this, he wanted to know Seanbaby's age, height, weight and fighting experience since he "learned he wasn't fighting a midget". Seanbaby stated he sent said information to Boll, after which Boll chose not to appear on the program. Boll similarly declined to fight Canadian comedian Ron Sparks.

The boxing matches are referred to in Radu Jude's 2023 feature film Do Not Expect Too Much from the End of the World. Boll appears in a cameo as himself directing a sci-fi horror movie and gets into conversation with the film's lead, a runner, Ilinca Manolache.

=== Petition to retire ===
In April 2008, The Guardian ran an article claiming Boll had promised to retire if an online petition at PetitionOnline asking him to do so received 1,000,000 signatures. A petition was later started on the site in response, with the 1,000,000 signature goal.

On 7 May 2008, the makers of Stride gum announced they would give each signer a digital coupon for a pack of gum if the petition obtained the required 1 million signatures by 14 May 2008. This deadline ultimately passed without the petition reaching 1 million signatures.

In a later interview with Mike Gencarelli of the Movie Mikes website on 22 March 2010, Boll stated that he would not retire if the petition received one million signatures, commenting:

I think no, it has been too long. If they would have made it to a million in like two months, then they would have had something. They even got sponsored by that gum factory. I felt like it's three years later, forget it. I also felt that people signed numerous times on the petition so it is probably only like 150,000 people that actually signed it.

The petition itself failed to reach one million signatures by the time PetitionOnline shut down on 30 September 2014, peaking at about 353,835 signatures.

==== Response ====
As part of a publicity stunt for Postal, Boll released a video claiming that he is "the only genius in the whole fucking [movie] business" and that other directors such as Michael Bay and Eli Roth are "fucking retards". He promised that his film Postal would be "way better than all that social-critic George Clooney bullshit that you get every fucking weekend". In response to an "Anti-Uwe Boll" online petition, Boll has also expressed hopes that somebody will start a Pro-Uwe Boll petition, which he would expect to hit a million signatures. As of 22 July 2012, the pro-Uwe Boll petition with the most signatures is the Long Live Uwe Boll poll with a total of 7,631 signatures.

Bay responded to the "fucking retards" comment by calling Boll "a sad being" and stated that he did not care "in the slightest" about the remark, while Roth facetiously described Boll's comments as the "greatest compliment ever". Boll later noted that the comments were meant to paint a generic picture over Hollywood, and that he has nothing against the people mentioned.

Boll then appeared on Thursday, 10 April's episode of G4's Attack of the Show, where he was interviewed regarding his controversial online retort. In the interview, he said (in regard to Bay and Roth responding to his criticisms) that Roth "has a sense of humor" and that Bay "has no sense of humor". He also jokingly stated that he believes that his upcoming adaptation of Postal (from the video game of the same name) could beat Indiana Jones and the Kingdom of the Crystal Skull at the box office.

In 2023, Boll responded that out of all the video game films he worked on, Postal 'holds a special place in my heart'. The film stands out for Boll because of the creative freedom he experienced, the ability to delve deep into satire and commentary, and the camaraderie shared with the cast and crew.

On 27 April 2008, Boll responded to Bay's "not caring about Boll" comment. "To prove who is the better director", Boll offered to challenge Bay to a boxing match at Mandalay Bay in Las Vegas. If Bay accepted, the match would last for 12 rounds and would take place in September. In response to Boll's offer, Bay again posted a statement, this time saying:

I never even heard his name till last week when he made threats and rants. The guy is a fucking idiot, making threats to me, Clooney, Eli Roth, says he has a doctorate—but uses the word "retard" in his vocabulary, come on. When you look at his videos, what is interesting are the backgrounds. I guess his low rent offices, with 15 year old 3/4 machines, archaic computers, this is just some dumb chump trying to get some fame when he has none, so he has to make YouTube lame quality anger rants. This guy just wants attention because he can't get any for the so called movies he makes. Nothing sadder when he had his screening in LA to an over half empty movie house.

On 7 June 2015, Boll released a video on his YouTube account titled "fuck you all", targeting those who did not fund his last film, then tentatively titled Rampage 3, on Kickstarter as he was unable to secure enough funds. The video quickly became popular and has over 1.9 million views as of June 2021.

On 20 October 2016, in an interview with the Toronto edition of Metro, Boll announced that Rampage: President Down, released a month earlier in September 2016, was his last film, citing market failures and funding difficulties. In the film's final credits, Boll can be seen tipping his hat and walking away from the camera. Boll would not make another film until he came out of retirement in 2020.

== Restaurants ==
Following his retirement from film-making, Boll entered the restaurant industry. His desire to become a restaurateur came from his own love of fine dining. He claims to have visited 120 Michelin-starred restaurants within a span of ten years, and has made a short video series of restaurant reviews.

In 2015, Boll opened the Bauhaus Restaurant in Vancouver, after noting a lack of German cuisine in the city. He hired Stefan Hartmann as executive chef, who earned a Michelin star for his own Hartmanns Restaurant in Berlin. Hartmann resigned from Bauhaus in April 2017, to be replaced by chefs David Mueller and Tim Schulte. It closed permanently in March 2020 due to issues with its landlord and COVID-19.

Bauhaus received some positive reviews from local and international food critics. The restaurant ranked 37th on the 2016 list of Canada's 100 Best Restaurants. It is also listed in The World's 50 Best Restaurants Discovery Series in 2017, being one of only three Canadian restaurants to be included. In 2020, it won a gold award for Best European Restaurant at the 2020 Vancouver Magazine Awards.

Boll has remarked about his newfound success in owning a restaurant: "It's interesting, right? I had to open up a restaurant to get good reviews."

In early 2018, Boll and his wife Natalie formed the Bauhaus Group to expand business. The group acquired the Displace Hashery in Kitsilano, transforming it into a sports bar and family-oriented restaurant under the new name The Blenheim. By 2019, The Blenheim had closed. They also announced plans to open a second Bauhaus Restaurant location in Toronto in early 2019. A third location in China was also planned, to be opened in the Ocean Flower Island artificial archipelago and led by two European Michelin-starred chefs. Neither restaurant opened.

== Personal life ==
Boll lived in Vancouver until 2020 and operated restaurants there, but he still retains his German citizenship. He married Canadian film producer Natalia Tudge in 2014. Together, they have a son and a stepson. He and his family moved back to Germany in 2020 following the closure of his restaurant during the COVID-19 pandemic.

== Filmography ==
=== Film ===
Year	Title	Director	Writer	Producer	Actor	Notes
1991	German Fried Movie	Yes	Yes	Yes	Yes	
1993	Barschel – Mord in Genf?	Yes	Yes	Yes	No	
1994	Amoklauf	Yes	Yes	Yes	Yes	
1997	Das erste Semester	Yes	Yes	Yes	No	
2000	Fíaskó	No	No	Yes	No	
2000	Sanctimony	Yes	Yes	Yes	No	
2001	Blackwoods	Yes	Yes	No	No	
2002	Angels Don't Sleep Here	No	No	Yes	No	
2002	Heart of America	Yes	Story	No	No	
2003	House of the Dead	Yes	No	Yes	No	Based on The House of the Dead franchise by Sega
2005	Alone in the Dark	Yes	No	Yes	No	Based on the Alone in the Dark series by Infogrames
2005	BloodRayne	Yes	No	No	No	Based on the BloodRayne franchise by Majesco and Terminal Reality
2007	In the Name of the King	Yes	No	Yes	No	Based on the Dungeon Siege series by Gas Powered Games
2007	They Wait	No	No	Yes	No	
2007	BloodRayne 2: Deliverance	Yes	No	No	No	Based on the BloodRayne franchise by Majesco and Terminal Reality
2007	Postal	Yes	Yes	Yes	Yes	Based on the Postal franchise by Running with Scissors
2007	Seed	Yes	Yes	Yes	No	
2008	Tunnel Rats	Yes	Yes	Yes	No	
2008	Alone in the Dark II	No	No	Yes	No	Based on the Alone in the Dark series by Infogrames
2008	Far Cry	Yes	No	Yes	No	Based on the Far Cry franchise by Crytek and Ubisoft
2009	Stoic	Yes	Yes	Yes	No	
2009	Rampage	Yes	Yes	Yes	No	
2009	Darfur	Yes	Yes	Yes	No	
2010	The Final Storm	Yes	No	Yes	No	
2010	Max Schmeling	Yes	Yes	No	Yes	
2011	Auschwitz	Yes	Yes	Yes	Yes	
2011	Blubberella	Yes	Yes	Yes	Yes	
2011	BloodRayne: The Third Reich	Yes	No	Yes	No	Based on the BloodRayne franchise by Majesco and Terminal Reality
2011	In the Name of the King 2: Two Worlds	Yes	No	Yes	No	Based on the Dungeon Siege series by Gas Powered Games
2013	Zombie Massacre	No	No	Yes	Yes	
2013	Assault on Wall Street	Yes	Yes	Yes	No	
2013	Suddenly	Yes	No	No	No	
2013	The Profane Exhibit	Yes	No	No	No	Segment "Basement"
2014	Blood Valley: Seed's Revenge	No	No	Yes	No	
2014	In the Name of the King 3: The Last Mission	Yes	No	Yes	No	Based on the Dungeon Siege series by Gas Powered Games
2014	Rampage: Capital Punishment	Yes	Yes	Yes	Yes	
2014	Morning Star Warrior	No	No	Yes	No	
2015	Anger of the Dead	No	No	Yes	No	
2015	Zombie Massacre 2: Reich of the Dead	No	No	Yes	No	
2016	Rampage: President Down	Yes	Yes	Yes	No	
2017	House of Evil	No	No	Yes	No	
2021	The Decline	No	No	Yes	No	Documentary
2021	Hanau (Deutschland im Winter - Part 1)	Yes	Yes	Yes	Yes	
2023	Do Not Expect Too Much from the End of the World	No	No	No	Yes	Cameo
2024	First Shift	Yes	Yes	Yes	No	
2024	Bandidos	Yes	Yes	Yes	Yes	Documentary
2025	Going Postal: The Legacy Foretold	No	No	No	Yes	Documentary
2025	Run	Yes	Yes	Yes	No	
2026	Citizen Vigilante	Yes	Yes	Yes	Yes	Cameo
TBA	First Shift: Vengeance	Yes	Yes	Yes	TBA	Post-production
TBA	First Shift: Redemption	Yes	Yes	Yes	TBA	Post-production
TBA	Seed: Legacy	No	No	Yes	TBA	Pre-production

=== Music videos ===
Year	Title	Artist	Ref.
2004	"Wish I Had an Angel" (Original and Alone in the Dark versions)	Nightwish	

== Awards and nominations ==
Year	Title	Award/Nomination
1994	Amoklauf	Nominated for Max Ophüls Award
2005	Alone in the Dark	Stinkers Bad Movie Award for Worst Sense of Direction; Nominated — Golden Raspberry Award for Worst Director
2005	BloodRayne	Stinkers Bad Movie Award for Worst Sense of Direction; Nominated — Golden Raspberry Award for Worst Picture; Nominated — Golden Raspberry Award for Worst Director
2007	In the Name of the King	Golden Raspberry Award for Worst Director; Nominated — Golden Raspberry Award for Worst Picture
2007	They Wait	Nominated — Leo Award for Best Feature Length Drama
2007	Postal	Golden Raspberry Award for Worst Director
2007	Seed	Best Special Effects at New York City Horror Film Festival
2008	Tunnel Rats	Golden Raspberry Award for Worst Director
2009	Darfur	Best international film at New York International Independent Film and Video Festival
