= Anger of the Dead =

2015 film directed by Francesco Picone

- Film poster
- Directed by: Francesco Picone
- Written by: Francesco Picone
- Produced by: Uwe Boll; Luca Boni; Marco Ristori
- Cinematography: Mirco Sgarzi
- Edited by: Francesco Picone
- Music by: Gabriele Caselli
- Production companies: Event Film Distribution; Extreme Video Snc
- Distributed by: Uncork'd Entertainment
- Release date: March 14, 2015 (Horrorant)
- Running time: 84 minutes
- Country: Italy

Anger of the Dead (also known as Apocalisse Zero) is a 2015 Italian zombie film written and directed by Francesco Picone.

== Plot ==
After a zombie apocalypse, Alice, who is pregnant, seeks to find a safer place to live. Along the way, she discovers a mute woman being held prisoner by the merciless Captain Rooker, a member of a rogue paramilitary group that desires to use young women to repopulate the world by sexual slavery hence produce future sons and daughters with natural immunity to starve all the zombies across the globe.

== Cast ==
- Aaron Stielstra as Captain Rooker
- Marius Bizau as Stephen
- Desiree Giorgetti as Prisoner
- Michael Segal as Peter
- Roberta Sparta as Alice
- David White as Ben
- Claudio Camilli as Hulk
- Chiara Paoli as Allie

== Release ==
In the United States, Anger of the Dead was released theatrically on 8 January and on DVD on 2 February 2016.

== Reception ==
Writing for The Hollywood Reporter, Frank Scheck described the film as a rip-off of The Walking Dead that has poor editing and cheap special effects. Martin Tsai of the Los Angeles Times wrote that the film "reveals particularly misogynistic and misanthropic filmmaking". Matt Boiselle of Dread Central called it "definitely worth the view-time" despite his initial misgivings over watching a horror film produced by Uwe Boll. Although Bloody Disgusting's reviewer Trace Thurman wrote that Anger of the Dead is "a poorly-scripted and poorly-acted slog of a film", he described Picone as "quite a talented director" and complimented the cinematography, which he said makes the film "somewhat watchable".
