= Johnny Lewis =

American actor (1983–2012)

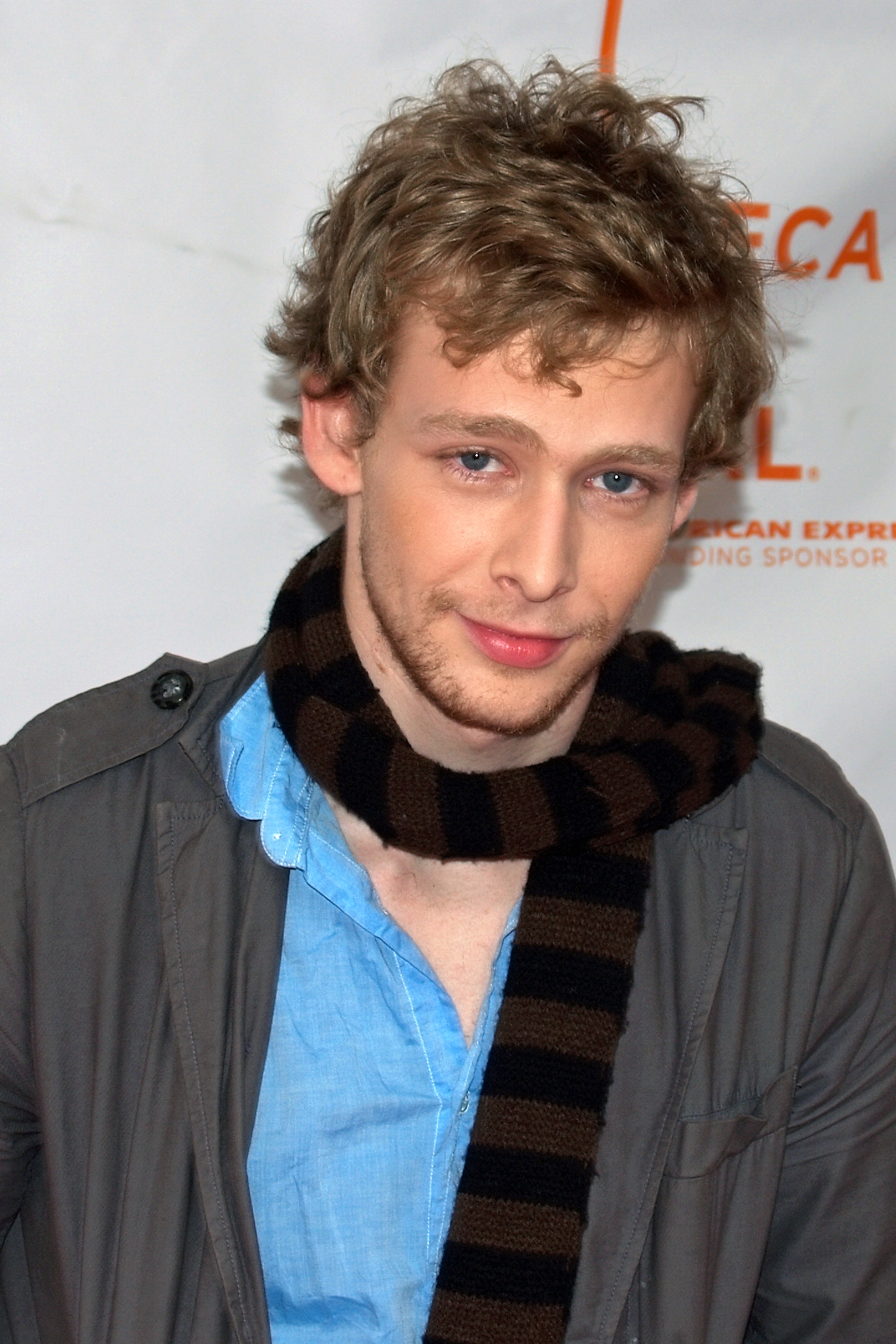
- Lewis at the 2007 Tribeca Film Festival
- Born: Jonathan Kendrick Lewis; October 29, 1983; Los Angeles, California, U.S.
- Died: September 26, 2012 (aged 28); Los Angeles, California, U.S.
- Occupation: Actor
- Years active: 2000–2012
- Partner: Diane Gaeta (2009–2010)
- Children: 1

Jonathan Kendrick Lewis (October 29, 1983 – September 26, 2012) was an American actor. He was best known for playing Kip "Half-Sack" Epps in the first two seasons of the FX series Sons of Anarchy, and for other television roles such as Gilby in The Sausage Factory (2001–2002), Pearce Chase in Quintuplets (2004–2005) and Dennis "Chili" Childress in The O.C. (2005–2006). Lewis also appeared in supporting roles in the films Underclassman (2005), Aliens vs. Predator: Requiem (2007), Felon (2008) and The Runaways (2010).

After sustaining head trauma from a motorcycle accident in 2011, Lewis was arrested three times between 2011 and 2012. In September 2012, he murdered the owner of a home in which he was renting a room and killed her cat. He was fatally injured after falling off the roof of the house.

== Early life ==
Johnny Lewis grew up in the Los Angeles neighborhoods of North Hollywood and Sherman Oaks. He was the middle child of Michael and Divona Lewis. Both parents were practicing Scientologists, and Lewis himself was a Scientologist for most of his life. After finishing school, Lewis left home at the age of 18 to pursue an acting career.

== Career ==
Lewis began making television appearances while in his late teens, with guest starring roles in Boston Public (2000), The Guardian (2001) and American Dreams (2002), among others. He made his feature film debut in 2004, in New Line Cinema's Raise Your Voice, and followed that up with Miramax Films' Underclassman in 2005. He co-starred as Pearce Chase, one of five siblings on the Fox series Quintuplets. Lewis also guest starred in four episodes of the Nickelodeon television series Drake & Josh as Scottie, one of Drake's bandmates, and from 2005 to 2006 he played Dennis "Chili" Childress on The O.C., another Fox series. He had a guest spot during the fifth season of Smallville, also in 2005. Lewis portrayed a copycat serial killer in Criminal Minds season 4 episode 15, "Zoe's Reprise" in 2009, which was his last television appearance before his death.

Lewis also starred in the film Magic Valley (2011), which premiered at the Tribeca Film Festival. He became well known for his role as prospect biker Kip "Half-Sack" Epps in the first two seasons of the FX series Sons of Anarchy.

== Personal life ==
Lewis dated American singer Katy Perry from 2005 to 2006. In mid-2009 he learned that he and his then-girlfriend, actress Diane Gaeta, were expecting their first child. The couple had split up by April 6, 2010, when the couple's daughter, Culla May, was born, but briefly attempted sharing a residence. Lewis eventually moved out, after which the couple engaged in a "long and painful" custody battle that Lewis ultimately lost.

=== Religion ===
Lewis was raised in a household that followed Scientology; his parents attained the highest available level within the Church of Scientology, called "Operating Thetan Level VIII", or OT VIII. Lewis starred in Scientology training films and endorsed the Scientology drug rehabilitation group Narconon. However, Lewis left Scientology in his early 20s.

=== Legal troubles ===
Lewis was arrested three times between 2011 and 2012. In January 2012, he struck two men in the head with a bottle while engaged in a fight. He pleaded no contest to charges of assault with a deadly weapon in the case. The second arrest came about six weeks after the first, with Lewis accused of attempting to break into a woman's home. He pleaded no contest in that case as well. Considering the cases, a probation official expressed that he was "very concerned for the well-being of not only the community but that of the defendant", stating Lewis suffered from mental health issues as well as chemical dependency and that he would "continue to be a threat to any community he may reside in". Lewis was released from a Los Angeles County jail on September 21, 2012, five days before his death.

== Psychiatric diagnosis ==
On October 30, 2011, Lewis suffered head injuries from a high-speed motorcycle accident. Though an MRI was recommended and Lewis' father scheduled MRI tests twice, Lewis refused to take them. His father later stated that he "pursued and encouraged psychiatric treatment for his son. It was Johnny who refused to comply." Lewis started manifesting bizarre and illogical behavior from that point on and concurrent to his ensuing legal troubles. The criminal psychologist Lydia Benecke states that Lewis most likely suffered from organic personality disorder, which worsened due to continuing (often self inflicted) head injury after the accident.

Bill Jensen reported in Los Angeles magazine that Lewis' family and attorneys pushed for rehab for marijuana addiction to avoid trial. When counselors observing Lewis rejected this, they pursued rehab for alcoholism instead. In early August 2012, Lewis was well enough to be granted provisional out-patient status after agreeing to be detained for "time served". He was assured that he would likely just spend a couple more days in jail; however, this turned into nearly two more months of detention, during which he suffered a severe downturn in health and spirits. Lewis was released from jail on September 21, 2012.

== Death ==
On September 26, 2012, at the age of 28, Lewis and his 81-year-old landlady, Catherine Davis, were both found dead at Davis' home in Los Angeles, California. Davis was known in Hollywood circles for operating the Writers' Villa, a bed-and-breakfast for up-and-coming performers, directors and writers in her home. Lewis, who had previously lived there in 2009, had recently moved back in. Police were called by neighbors after Lewis violently attacked two people at the property next door, and Davis was heard screaming. Officers from the Los Angeles Police Department (LAPD) found Lewis' body on the home's driveway. Davis was found dead inside the house with severe head injuries; her pet cat was also found dead in the bathroom.

Neighbors reported that Lewis had jumped over a fence to the next-door property, assaulted a house painter and the homeowner (to whom Lewis had earlier introduced himself as "John, your new neighbor") and then jumped back over the fence onto Davis' property. According to the LAPD, Lewis then either fell or jumped from the roof, garage or patio of Davis' house. His death was investigated as a homicide, and it was later determined that he had killed Davis by manual strangulation and blunt force trauma to her head.

An autopsy report released on November 29, 2012, stated that Lewis did not have any drugs or alcohol in his system when he died. Toxicology reports came back negative for alcohol, marijuana, cocaine, psychedelic drugs or anti-psychotic medication. There was no indication that Lewis had been pushed or that he jumped from the roof in an act of suicide. His death was ruled accidental.

Lewis' family has spoken out about his history of untreated head trauma, leading some to speculate that he developed a psychological disorder, which led to his sudden spurts of violence. Sons of Anarchy creator Kurt Sutter tweeted about his death: "It was a tragic end for an extremely talented guy, who unfortunately had lost his way. I wish I could say that I was shocked by the events last night, but I was not. I am deeply sorry that an innocent life had to be thrown into his destructive path. Yes, it's a day of mourning, but it's also a day of awareness and gratitude. Sadly, some of us carry the message by dying."

== Filmography ==
=== Film ===
Year	Title	Role
2004	Raise Your Voice	Engelbert "Kiwi" Wilson
2005	Pretty Persuasion	Warren Prescott
2005	Underclassman	Alexander Jeffries
2007	Palo Alto	Nolan
2007	Aliens vs. Predator: Requiem	Ricky Howard
2008	One Missed Call	Brian Sousa
2008	Felon	Snowman
2010	The Runaways	Scottie
2011	Lovely Molly	Tim
2011	Magic Valley	John
2012	186 Dollars to Freedom	Jorge

=== Television ===
Year	Title	Role	Notes
2000	7th Heaven	Norton	Episode: "Tunes"
2000	Malcolm in the Middle	Cadet Martin	Episode: "Therapy"
2001–2003	Boston Public	Bodhi	4 episodes
2001	Undressed	Ray	5 episodes
2001–2002	The Sausage Factory	Gilby	Main cast
2001	Judging Amy	Desmond	Episode: "Surprised by Gravity"
2002	The Guardian	Ted Popper	Episode: "Mothers of the Disappeared"
2002	Yes, Dear	Ricky	Episode: "Making Babies"
2003–2004	American Dreams	Lenny	Recurring role (season 2)
2004	Drake & Josh	Scottie	4 episodes
2004–2005	Quintuplets	Pearce Chase	Main cast
2005–2006	The O.C.	Dennis "Chili" Childress	Recurring role (season 3)
2005	Smallville	Gabriel Duncan	Episode: "Hidden"
2006	CSI: Crime Scene Investigation	Tad Sidley	Episode: "Up in Smoke"
2007	Bones	Enzo Falcinella	Episode: "The Priest in the Churchyard"
2007	Shark	Michael Hackford	Episode: "Student Body"
2008	Cold Case	Truitt "Spider" Leland '98	Episode: "Spiders"
2008–2009	Sons of Anarchy	Kip "Half Sack" Epps	Main cast (seasons 1–2)
2009	Criminal Minds	Eric Ryan Olson	Episode: "Zoe's Reprise", final television role
