= The Fallen (2004 film) =

- Directed by: Ari Taub
- Written by: Nick Day; Caio Ribeiro
- Produced by: Curtis Mattikow
- Starring: Daniel Asher; Brain Bancale; Mathew Black; Frank Licari
- Cinematography: Claudia Amber; Caio Ribeiro
- Edited by: Ari Taub
- Music by: Sergei Dreznin
- Production company: Brooklyn Independent Studios
- Distributed by: Anthem Pictures; Benelux Film Distribution
- Release dates: October 10, 2004 (USA); July 30, 2007 (UK)
- Running time: 112 minutes
- Countries: USA; Germany; Italy
- Languages: English; German; Italian
- Budget: $600,000
- Box office: $1,000,000

The Fallen is a 2004 American-German-Italian war film directed by Ari Taub. The World War II film depicts the confusion of both sides in wartime Italy. The film portrays partisans and regular soldiers ineffectively coursing through the difficult mountainous terrain. The suggestive dialogue is seen with a minute portrayal of dark humor during combat where both sides are hesitant to win over the other side due to the chaotic nature of discord, disorganization and the conflicts of war in general.

== Plot ==
A group of uniformed but undisciplined American soldiers are tasked with taking ammo to the front line. On the way their jeep breaks down and they commandeer a wheelbarrow from some passing refugees to put the ammo in, and set off cross-country on foot. The refugees get the vehicle started and make use of it themselves. The Americans take shelter in a farm overnight. A majority of them are of Italian descent, including one socially accepted soldier who accompanies them. An alleged Scottish resident sheltering with them is actually a German spy and radios their position to the German army officer who is constantly having trouble with cut communication cables.

Meanwhile, the Italian troops, who are treated as inferiors by their German counterparts, are given rations. They are allotted only half rations, which causes a riot. The Germans also wish the Italians to take on the lesser task of confronting the partisans, rather than take on the Americans directly for their own gain. When the two Italian parties meet they are reluctant to fight, the partisans coerce some men to swap sides. When the Italian troops run into the pseudo-partisans, some of them become Communist sympathizers to avoid death. Their leader is shot and his two henchmen are recruited into the army.

The Italian troops bravely resist in a confrontation with the Americans, but are later faced with a tank, killing a lead member of their group. When the Americans reach the front line they are pressed to help with the battle by engaging the Germans directly. The Germans have the disadvantage of not directly engaging with the partisans because communication lines are constantly cut.

The Germans are ordered to retreat except for the commanding officer, one sergeant and a soldier who had earlier lost his leg in the course of combat. The volunteers stay behind knowing that they will certainly die. The main opposing officer and unnamed soldier take position in a machine gun nest for their last stand. They make a heroic effort, all dying in the process, while taking as many Americans with them as possible.

== Cast ==
- Daniel Asher ... Lt. Watts
- C. J. Barkus ... Private Pulver
- Mathew Black ... Sgt. Hoakes
- Justin Brett ... Kinross
- Frank Licari ... Pepino

== Awards ==
- Big Bear Lake International Film Festival 2004:
  - Audience Award - Best Feature Film: Ari Taub
- Breckenridge Festival of Film 2004:
  - Best of the Fest Award - Best Screenplay: Nick Day & Caio Ribeiro
- Milan International Film Festival 2005:
  - Audience Award - Ari Taub
  - Best Director - Ari Taub

== Reviews ==
The film received a score of 62/100 from 7 critics on Metacritic.com. Rotten Tomatoes gave the film an 86% and an average rating of 6.7/10
