= Amoklauf =

1994 film by Uwe Boll

- Film poster
- Directed by: Uwe Boll
- Written by: Uwe Boll
- Produced by: Uwe Boll
- Starring: Michael Rasmussen; Birgit Stein; Christian Kahrmann; Sonja Kerskes; Susanne Leutenegger; Anja Niederfahrenhorst; Martin Armknecht; Ralph Grobel
- Cinematography: Richard Eckes
- Edited by: Richard Eckes
- Music by: Uwe Spies
- Production company: Bolu Filmproduktion und Verleih
- Distributed by: Bolu Filmproduktion und Verleih
- Release date: February 3, 1994 (Germany)
- Running time: 62 minutes
- Country: Germany
- Language: German
- Budget: 50,000 DM

Amoklauf (English: "Rampage") is a 1994 German horror film written and directed by Uwe Boll. Boll's third feature, it established a number of directorial trademarks that would recur throughout the filmmaker's career, such as a scene involving a mass shooting and a premise revolving around "psychologically disturbed men and intersecting systems of oppression conspiring to unleash the violent potential within them."

== Plot ==
The film's unnamed protagonist flashes back to or fantasizes about murdering a female cyclist and is then shown pessimistically contemplating human nature while watching an episode of The Price Is Right. After observing a pair of yuppies vivisect a fish at the restaurant he works at as a waiter, the man returns to his barren apartment, where he further ponders humanity, this time while watching Mondo films. The waiter burns a photograph of his mother and flashes back to killing his father while the man was watching The Price Is Right.

The next day, the waiter masturbates and gets drunk but is interrupted by his neighbor, whom he stabs; he returns to drinking and pleasuring himself as the woman bleeds to death next to him. After flashing back to witnessing a possible death in a washroom, the man proceeds to a park, where he shoots at least eight people, staggering off after one of the victims stabs him with a pocketknife.

== Cast ==
- Michael Rasmussen as The Waiter
- Birgit Stein as Neighbor
- Christian Kahrmann as Student
- Sonja Kerskes
- Susanne Leutenegger
- Anja Niederfahrenhorst
- Martin Armknecht
- Ralph Grobel
- Jo Betzing as Father
- Roland Jankowsky
- Uwe Boll
- Veronika Caspers
- Sascha Reinhardt
- Thomas Müller
- Donato Barbera
- Sam Winkels
- Richard Berninger
- Gerd Rustenbeck
- Katja Waszkowiak
- Sonja Hofmann
- Baxter

== Production ==
Shot on purposefully degraded 35 mm film, Amoklauf was personally financed by Boll with the 50,000 Deutsche Marks he had remaining in his business account after the dissolution of his partnership with Frank Lustig, whom he previously collaborated with on his earlier features, German Fried Movie and Barschel – Mord in Genf. Fearing Amoklauf could be his final film, Boll made it "as if I were saying goodbye" and thus gave it a melancholic tone, music that would "represent the end of a life" and a central theme discussing "the capabilities of what humans can do."

== Release ==
Amoklauf premiered in Berlin, to some walkouts, and was subsequently screened at film festivals throughout Germany and Paris. It was released on DVD in 2005 by Eurovideo and Screen Power Home Entertainment.

== Reception ==
While Jim McLennan of Film Blitz admitted Amoklauf had "interesting" flourishes, he still gave the film a D+ and opined that it was largely "amateur-hour stuff" that "overstays its welcome." Amoklauf was wholly condemned by The Worldwide Celluloid Massacre, which derisively dismissed it as "Boring, slow and pointless."
