= Sammy Sheik =

Egyptian actor (born 1981)

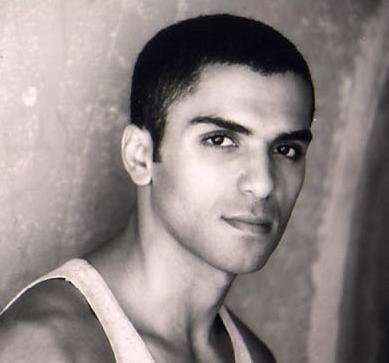
- Sheik in 2013
- Born: November 15, 1981 (age 44); Egypt
- Citizenship: Egypt; United States
- Occupation: Actor
- Years active: 2004–present

Sammy Sheik (Arabic: سامي الشيخ; born November 15, 1981) is an Egyptian-American actor. He is best known for playing the role of "Mustafa" in Clint Eastwood's 2014 war drama film American Sniper.

== Career ==
Sheik was cast to play Al Jazeera executive, Mukhtar Al-Mujib in Albert Brooks' feature film, Looking for Comedy in the Muslim World. Soon thereafter, he started landing roles in TV series. He played a calculating hooded eyed killer, Mohamed El-Razani on the FX series, Over There, ring leader, Masheer Abu Marzuq on Fox's 24, which led to the role of Jamal Bin Mohamed on 24's spinoff show The Rookie. He also played a hot blooded bedouin, Kamal on ABC's Lost, and made guest appearances on NCIS, The Unit, My Own Worst Enemy and In the Moment. He played the recurring role Hany on the Showtime's United States of Tara.

== Personal life ==
Sheik splits his time between Cairo and Los Angeles.

== Filmography ==
Film and television roles
Year	Title	Role
2004	What Should You Do?	Avenger
2005	Dangerous Perceptions	Jadash
2005	Untold Stories of the E.R.	Dr. Armin
2005	Tayer	Seif
2005	Over There	Hooded Eyes
2005	Cries from Ramah	Hani
2005	Looking for Comedy in the Muslim World	Mukhtar Al-Mujib
2006	Kal: Yesterday & Tomorrow	Amir
2007	AmericanEast	Abdullah
2007	24	Masheer Abu Marzuq
2007	The Big Bang Theory	Omer
2007	Charlie Wilson's War	Stinger
2007	The Rookie	Jamal Bin Mohamed
2007	The Morgue	Samim
2008	Lost	Kamal
2008	Mideast Midwest	Mohamed
2008	NCIS	Fadel
2008	An American Carol	Fayed
2008	The Unit	Insurgent Leader
2008	My Own Worst Enemy	Server
2009	Darfur	The Commander
2010	Axis of Evil	Ali
2010	In the Moment	Edgar
2010	This Narrow Place	Hassan
2010	United States of Tara	Hany
2010	Three Veils	Ali
2010	Nikita	Bashir Maro/ Agent Rahal
2010	Walk a Mile in My Pradas	Carlos
2011	The Son of an Afghan Farmer	Hassan
2011	Transformers: Dark of the Moon	Lt. Faraj
2011	Homeland	Imam Rafan Gohar
2012	Hekayat Banat (Season 1)	Karim
2013	Lone Survivor	Taraq
2014	American Sniper	Mustafa
2015	The Blacklist	Shahin Navabi/ Zal Bin Hasaan
2017	Cold Hell (Die Hölle)	Saeed el Hadary
2017	Sand Castle	Mahmoud
2018	Marriage: Impossible (Kedba Bidaa)	Ahmed
2019	Young Justice: Outsiders	Samad Daou (voice)
2024	El-Hashasheen	Kiya Buzurg-Ummid
2025	Run	Idris
