= Patricia Dahlquist =

Canadian singer and actress

- Born: Oxford, England
- Occupation: singer

Patricia Dahlquist is a Canadian singer and actress. During her music career, Dahlquist released two studio albums and won the Juno Award for Most Promising Female Vocalist of the Year in 1976. After her final album in 1982, Dahlquist opened up a non-profit opera organization in British Columbia and was awarded the Surrey Civic Treasure Award in 2013. As an actress, Dahlquist was in Blackwoods, The Hamster Cage and various TV movies.

== Early life and education ==
Dahlquist was born in Oxford, England during the height of the Second World War in 1942. After the war ended her family moved to Canada where they settled in Nelson, British Columbia. She attended the University of British Columbia to complete a master's degree in theatre. Additional studies Dahlquist completed were in violin and ballet.

== Career ==
Dahlquist started working in music during the 1970s. After touring with Hagood Hardy, she released her first album This is Patricia Dahlquist in 1975 and her final self-titled album in 1982. During her music career, "Keep Our Love Alive", originally written and recorded by Paul Davis, reached #20 on the RPM Top Singles in 1975 and #157 on the year-end RPM singles chart. It also reached #16 on the CHUM Chart. The following year, This is Patricia Dahlquist peaked at #88 on the RPM Top 100. On the RPM middle of the road chart, "I Just Wanna Keep It Together" reached #16 in 1977.

After her second album, Dahlquist became a voice coach. Apart from singing, Dahlquist started a non-profit opera organization for British Columbian youth in 2006. Her first opera The King Who Wouldn't Sing debuted that year and the following opera Spirit Moon was released in 2007. Outside of music, Dahlquist began her acting career starring in the 1962 movie The Street. After featuring in TV movies from the 1980s to 2000s, Dahlquist also appeared in Blackwoods and The Hamster Cage. During her time as an actress, Dahlquist was a theatre teacher and director. Upon completing a five-year stint in Menopositive, The Musical from 1999 to 2004, Dahlquist moved on to focus on her teaching career.

Dahlquist won the 1976 Juno Award for Most Promising Female Vocalist of the Year. In 2013, she was a winner of the Surrey Civic Treasure Award.

== Filmography ==
=== Film ===
Year	Title	Role	Notes
2001	Blackwoods	Mrs. Sullivan	
2005	The Hamster Cage	Jenn	
2015	She Who Must Burn	Nurse	

=== Television ===
Year	Title	Role	Notes
1971	The Manipulators		Episode: "Nobody's Business"
1987	Assault and Matrimony	Sally	Television film
1991	The Commish	Mrs. Brown	Episode: "The Poisoned Tree"
1991	Street Justice	Woman	Episode: "Tables Turned"
1992	Dead Ahead: The Exxon Valdez Disaster	Millie Iarossi	Television film
1993	Highlander: The Series	Mother	Episode: "Epitaph for Tommy"
1993	Madison	Mary Novak	Episode: "Tough Cries"
1995	Frostfire	Barbara Riordan	Television film
1997	The X-Files	Susan Chambliss	2 episodes
1998	The Outer Limits	Doctor	Episode: "Sarcophagus"
1998	Beauty	Laurie Kramer	Television film
1999	Our Guys: Outrage at Glen Ridge	Doctor	Television film
1999	Cold Squad	Mrs. Michaelson	Episode: "First Deadly Sin"
2000	First Wave	Martha Levi	Episode: "Asylum"
2005	The Dead Zone	Chief of Medicine	Episode: "Double Vision"
2006	Augusta, Gone	Gillian	Television film
2006	The Obsession	Mrs. Darnell	Television film
2006	Whistler	Mrs. Watt	Episode: "Will the Real Beck...?"
2006	Home by Christmas	Grace	Television film
