= Seed (2007 film) =

- Film poster
- Directed by: Uwe Boll
- Written by: Uwe Boll
- Produced by: Uwe Boll; Dan Clarke; Shawn Williamson
- Starring: Michael Paré; Will Sanderson; Ralf Möller; Jodelle Ferland; Thea Gill; Andrew Jackson
- Cinematography: Mathias Neumann
- Edited by: Karen Porter
- Music by: Jessica de Rooij
- Production companies: Boll KG Productions; Pitchblack Pictures
- Distributed by: Vivendi Entertainment
- Release date: April 27, 2007 (Germany)
- Running time: 90 minutes
- Country: Canada
- Language: English
- Budget: $10 million
- Box office: $155,362

Seed is a 2007 Canadian horror film written, produced, and directed by Uwe Boll.

== Plot ==
As a boy, a reclusive and antisocial Sufferton resident, Max Seed, was disfigured in a school bus crash that killed everyone involved. In 1973, Seed began torturing and murdering people, filming some of his victims starving to death in his locked basement and racking up a body count of 666. In 1979, Detective Matt Bishop arrests Seed in a siege that claims the lives of five of Bishop's fellow officers. Seed is sentenced to death by electric chair and incarcerated on an island prison, where he is a model inmate, only acting out when he kills three guards who try to rape him.

On Seed's execution date, the electric chair fails to kill him after two shocks. Not wanting Seed to be released due to a state law that says any convicted criminal who survives three jolts of 15,000 volts each for 45 seconds walks, the prison staff and Bishop declare Seed dead and bury him alive in the prison cemetery. Seed digs his way out of his grave a few hours later and returns to the prison, where he kills the executioner, doctor, and warden before swimming back to the mainland. The next day, while investigating the massacre, Bishop realizes Seed was responsible when he discovers the serial killer's empty cemetery plot.

Over several months, Seed kills dozens of people, with one long shot showing him beating a bound woman with a lumberjack's axe for five straight minutes. One day, a videotape showing Bishop's house is sent to the detective's office. Knowing this means Seed will go after his family, Bishop races home, finding his wife, Sandy, and daughter, Emily, gone, and the four officers charged with guarding the house dismembered in the bathroom.

Driving to Seed's old residence, Bishop is lured into a basement room containing a television and a video camera and locked inside. The television turns on and depicts Seed with Sandy and Emily. Emily informs Bishop that Seed wants Bishop to shoot himself, but Sandy tells him not to do it, claiming Seed will kill them anyway. Bishop tries to negotiate by having Seed shoot him himself, but Seed does not accept it and kills Sandy with a nail gun, prompting Bishop into shooting himself in the head, believing that doing so will make Seed release his daughter. Instead, Seed takes the daughter to the room containing her father's corpse and locks her in it, leaving her to die. As Emily sobs for her two dead parents, the film ends as Seed is free to continue his killing spree with no end.

== Cast ==
- Michael Paré as Detective Matthew Bishop
- Will Sanderson as Maxwell "Max" Seed
- Ralf Möller as Warden Arnold Calgrove
- Jodelle Ferland as Emily Bishop
- Thea Gill as Sandra Bishop
- Andrew Jackson as Dr. Parker Wickson
- Brad Turner as Officer Thompson
- Phillip Mitchell as Officer Simpson
- Mike Dopud as Officer Flynn
- John Sampson as Officer Ward
- Tyron Leitso as Officer Jeffery
- Michael Eklund as The Executioner

== Production ==
Filming ran from July 17 to August 11, 2006 in British Columbia, Canada on a $10 million budget.

== Release ==
Seed was shown on the Weekend of Fear Festival in Erlangen, Germany on April 27, 2007. Director Uwe Boll was there to present the film and also to answer questions. Before the film started, Boll emphasized the brutality of the film. Furthermore, he pointed out that PETA, who receive 2.5% of worldwide sales of the film, made archival recordings of animal cruelty available for the use in Seed's introduction.

The DVD release includes a trailer for the film and an Executing Seed featurette. It also includes a short film by Richard Gale titled Criticized and a copy of the video game Advent Rising for PC, both which are unrelated to the Seed film.

== Reception ==
Jonathan Melton of the Eye for Film gave the rating of one star out of five, explaining "endless faults" with the film: "the characters are uninteresting and forgettable, the dialogue is almost non-existent, the plot is riddled with holes. In short, this is not a good movie (the lowest rating on Eye For Film is one star, but if I could I would give it less)." The DVD release was also struck down with one of five score, with the review stating that "almost by accident, [the featurette] manages to tell you more about a film set than dozens of other behind the scenes features on better films."

Johnny Butane of Dread Central gave the film a score of two out of five.

== Awards ==
- Best Special Effects – 2007 New York City Horror Film Festival

== Sequel ==
A sequel, directed by Marcel Walz and titled Blood Valley: Seed's Revenge, was released in 2014. It was produced by Boll, and stars Caroline Williams, Christa Campbell, Nick Principe, Jared Demetri Luciano, Manoush, Natalie Scheetz, Annika Strauss, and Sarah Hayden.
