= Independent Days International Filmfest =

The Independent Days International Filmfest (short: IDIF) is the biggest Film festival in Karlsruhe, Germany. Its annual program shows a best of independent films from all around the world. Host is the nonprofit organization Filmboard Karlsruhe e.V.

Since 2007, the festival takes place in the arthouse movie theater Schauburg Cinerama, which has often been awarded for its culturally outstanding achievements. The festival has presented early works by directors Uwe Boll, Axel Ranisch and Felix Stienz, among others. Its selection focuses mainly on live-action short films, but also includes animations, documentaries and features.

In 2009, the Independent Days took part in Das Fest, one of the biggest open-air events in Germany, with four short film programs.

The 17th edition of the festival was held from April 5 to April 9, 2017.
