= Stoic (film) =

- DVD box art
- Directed by: Uwe Boll
- Written by: Uwe Boll
- Produced by: Daniel Clarke; Shawn Williamson; Uwe Boll
- Starring: Edward Furlong; Shaun Sipos; Sam Levinson; Steffen Mennekes
- Cinematography: Mathias Neumann
- Edited by: Thomas Sabinsky
- Music by: Jessica de Rooij
- Release date: June 22, 2009 (United Kingdom)
- Running time: 91 minutes
- Country: Canada
- Language: English
- Budget: $2 million

Stoic is a 2009 arthouse drama film directed and written by Uwe Boll and starring Edward Furlong, Sam Levinson and Shaun Sipos. The film is one of two dramas, the other Darfur, Boll planned to direct.

== Plot ==
The film is presented through several flashbacks as the three inmates are being interviewed in regards to the apparent suicide of their 4th cellmate, Mitch Palmer, who has hanged himself. It is gradually revealed throughout the interviews that the inmates tortured and humiliated Mitch prior to his hanging.

The film begins with the four cellmates playing poker for cigarettes and trading stories of their lives prior to their incarcerations. After Mitch wins all of his cellmates’ cigarettes, they coerce him to play one more game. Mitch says he’ll put his entire bag of cigarettes on the table, and the loser has to eat an entire tube of toothpaste.

Mitch loses the round and refuses to eat the toothpaste as the cellmates continually ask him to uphold his end of the bet. At first it seems like the cellmates decide to give up and call it a night. Harry Katish, who is in jail for armed robbery, pretends to wash up and wraps a towel around a bar of soap. He then goes to Mitch and begins to scream and hit him with the soap, as the others grab him and hold him down. All three force him to eat the entire tube of toothpaste. The three leave him be as Mitch lies on the floor, clutching at his stomach. Peter Thompson, a low level drug dealer, goes to Mitch and pretends to be concerned, and says he’ll make him a special drink that will make him feel better. Peter grabs a glass, and fills it with water, salt, and a piece of pepper. Mitch says he isn’t stupid, but the other cellmates tell him as far as they’re all concerned, he already drank the drink, and threaten to hold him down again.

Mitch pushes the drink over on to the floor. The cellmates laugh, and Peter says he’ll make another drink to make him feel better. Peter takes water filled with urine and feces from the toilet bowl. Mitch however, is choking and throwing up, but the cellmates start a countdown advising they’ll force him to drink it. Mitch grabs the glass and after one sip begins to throw up and choke.

Jack Ulrich, in jail for arson, becomes enraged and violently beats Mitch, telling him to lick up his vomit with his tongue and belittles him as a pig. Mitch begs and pleads that he’ll clean up the mess with his mop, but Jack continues to beat him harder as Peter and Harry watch apathetically. Mitch crawls to the mess and begins to lick the vomit, further becoming sick. The cellmates become bored and decide to call it a night.

As the cellmates sleep, Mitch sits down and stares at the emergency button. He makes a run and presses it, screaming into the intercom that he needs help, but the cellmates wake up and drag him to the wall and cover his mouth. Peter, speaking to the guards through the intercom, says he accidentally bumped into the button. The three cellmates beat Mitch to the ground, and then all urinate in a cup, pouring it down Mitch’s throat.

Jack is further enraged that Mitch pressed the emergency button, and then anally rapes him. Peter, witnessing the rape, begins to feel remorseful and says things have gone too far, however he is threatened with violence by Jack and Harry, with Jack remarking that he’s “already a part of this” and to “remember who made the drink”. Harry then stares at Mitch, grabs the mop handle, and violently sodomizes Mitch with it, then putting the blood and feces covered handle in Mitch’s mouth. Mitch becomes catatonic as Jack and Harry watch TV, and Peter begins to shake with remorse.

Jack and Harry confront Peter on his remorse, who states he is fearful that the guards will see the blood and bruises during their routine checks, and that serving a longer sentence as a result is not worth this. Harry asks Peter what they should do, and Peter recounts an urban myth in that if a cellmate commits suicide, the psychological trauma inflicted on his fellow cellmates will significantly reduce their sentence. The three cellmates decide that Mitch needs to hang himself. They first prop him against the barred window and tie his neck with a TV cord, but the cord breaks when they let him hang. They then try with Mitch’s bedsheets and have him stand on a garbage can, granting him a final cigarette before Harry says “enough of this shit” and kicks the garbage can away, killing Mitch. Peter is reduced to tears as Jack and Harry remain apathetic.

The next morning, the three cellmates agree to hit the emergency button and pretend to be upset by what has happened, however Peter remains silent. Throughout the interviews, Harry denies any involvement or accusations in regards to the torture and humiliation and remains indifferent to what has transpired; Jack admits his guilt and is remorseful, stating he doesn’t know why he did what he did and wants his hands washed clean; Peter is in tears for the entire interview, stating the hanging was his idea and Mitch did not deserve what happened to him.

The film ends with text stating the three cellmates, all serving 2- to 3-year sentences, received an additional 8 to 15 years for their role in Mitch Palmer’s death. It is then revealed Mitch was serving a 6-month sentence for vagrancy and resisting arrest. The closing frames show Mitch helping Peter do proper pushups, and bonding in a friendly manner with his fellow cellmates.

== Cast ==
- Edward Furlong as Harry Katish
- Shaun Sipos as Mitch Palmer
- Sam Levinson as Peter Thompson
- Steffen Mennekes as Jack Ulrich
- Jamie Switch as Guard #3
- Michael Teigen as Guard #4

== Development ==
According to director Uwe Boll, Stoic centers on a true incident which occurred in Siegburg prison in 2006 where three prisoners raped, tortured and ultimately forced their cellmate to commit suicide over a period of ten hours in a series of events that began with a poker bet involving the consumption of a tube of toothpaste.

The film is based on a film treatment created by Uwe Boll. The dialogue was almost entirely improvised by the actors.

== See also ==
- Picco (2010)
