= Darfur (film) =

2009 American film

- British DVD cover
- Directed by: Uwe Boll
- Written by: Uwe Boll; Chris Roland
- Produced by: Uwe Boll; Dan Clarke; Chris Roland
- Starring: David O'Hara; Kristanna Loken
- Cinematography: Mathias Neumann
- Edited by: Thomas Sabinski
- Music by: Jessica de Rooij
- Distributed by: Phase 4 Films
- Release date: November 23, 2009
- Running time: 98 minutes
- Country: United States
- Language: English

Darfur (previously called Janjaweed) is a 2009 American war drama film directed by Uwe Boll concerning the War in Darfur, starring David O'Hara, Kristanna Loken, Billy Zane and Edward Furlong. The film was also released as Attack on Darfur.

== Plot ==
Six Western journalists visit a small village in Darfur in western Sudan under the escort of a squad of soldiers of the African Union (AU) peacekeeping mission. When they learn the brutal state sponsored militia called the Janjaweed are heading towards the village, they are faced with an impossible decision: leave Sudan and report the atrocities to the world, or risk their own lives and stay in the hopes of averting a certain slaughter.

While most of them flee back to their base, two of the journalists, Freddie Smith, and Theo Schwartz, decide to stay behind along with the Nigerian Army commander of the AU unit, Captain Jack Tobamke, to try to save the villagers when the Arab Janjaweed enter the village and begin to indiscriminately kill all the Black African men, women, and children. Despite their efforts to save some villagers, Captain Tobamke, Theo, and Freddie are all killed one by one in the subsequent shootout with the Janjaweed, but not before killing or wounding a few dozen of the savage militia. The surviving Janjaweed then burn the village to the ground and move on, presumably to continue their genocide rampage across the Darfur landscape.

A female member of the journalist team, Malin Lausberg, who had fled with most of the other reporters and AU soldiers during the Janjaweed attack, now returns to the destroyed village the next day with a group of AU soldiers only to find everyone dead, including two of her colleagues. But she finds an infant that Freddie protected by hiding under Theo's dead body as the sole survivor of the massacre. Malin takes the baby with her as she and the rest of the AU troops leave the destroyed village behind.

== Cast ==
- David O'Hara as Freddie Smith
- Kristanna Loken as Malin Lausberg
- Billy Zane as Bob Jones
- Edward Furlong as Adrian Archer
- Noah Danby as Theo Schwartz
- Matt Frewer as Ted Duncan
- Hakeem Kae-Kazim as Captain Jack Tobamke
- Sammy Sheik as Janjaweed Commander

== Development ==
Darfur was filmed outside of Cape Town, South Africa in February and March 2009. Boll himself describes the film as "something that's very shocking". Much of the dialogue is improvised by the actors and the film is shot mostly with handheld cameras to convey a sense of realism, similar to Boll's previous films Stoic and 1968 Tunnel Rats.

== Reception ==
In September 2010 Darfur won the New York International Independent Film and Video Festival prize for the best international film.

Human rights activist John Prendergast and Amnesty International were both reported to be impressed with the film.
