= Ethan Maniquis =

American film editor

- Born: United States
- Occupations: Film editor, director
- Notable work: Machete

Ethan Maniquis is an American film editor and director. He co-directed the 2010 film Machete and directed the 2022 film Limonada as well commercials and music videos.

== Filmography ==
=== Editor ===
Year	Film	Director	Notes
1997	Real Stories of the Donut Men	Beeaje Quick	
1999	Absolutely 100% Guilty	David G. Phinney	Documentary
2005	Secuestro Express	Jonathan Jakubowicz	
2006	Behind Enemy Lines II: Axis of Evil	James Dodson	Direct-to-DVD
2007	Grindhouse	Robert Rodriguez	Segment: Planet Terror
2008	The Other End of the Line	James Dodson	
2009	Shorts	Robert Rodriguez	
2013	The Last Duane	Chris Ekstein	
2015	The Badger Game	Joshua Wagner & Thomas Zambeck	
2016	Hands of Stone	Jonathan Jakubowicz	
2019	100 Days to Live	Ravin Gandhi	
2020	Crabs in a Bucket	Paolo Pilladi	
2024	First Shift	Uwe Boll	
2025	Run	Uwe Boll	
2026	Citizen Vigilante	Uwe Boll	
2026	Kill Code	Justin Price	Post-production
TBA	First Shift: Vengeance	Uwe Boll	Post-production
TBA	First Shift: Redemption	Uwe Boll	Post-production

=== Other ===
Year	Film	Director	Role
1995	Desperado	Robert Rodriguez	Assistant film editor
1995	Four Rooms	Robert Rodriguez	Apprentice editor
1996	From Dusk till Dawn	Robert Rodriguez	Assistant editor
1999	Passion and Romance: The Wings of the Dove	N/A	Documentary
1999	Passion and Romance: The Wings of the Dove	N/A	Post-production coordinator
2001	The Man with No Eyes	Tim Cox	Short film
2001	The Man with No Eyes	Tim Cox	Visual effects editor
2002	Spy Kids 2: The Island of Lost Dreams	Robert Rodriguez	Visual effects editor
2003	Spy Kids 3-D: Game Over	Robert Rodriguez	Visual effects editor
2003	Once Upon a Time in Mexico	Robert Rodriguez	Visual effects editor
2005	Sin City	Robert Rodriguez	Actor (Bozo #1) & Associate editor
2010	Machete	Robert Rodriguez	Co-director
