= Kristen Renton =

American actress

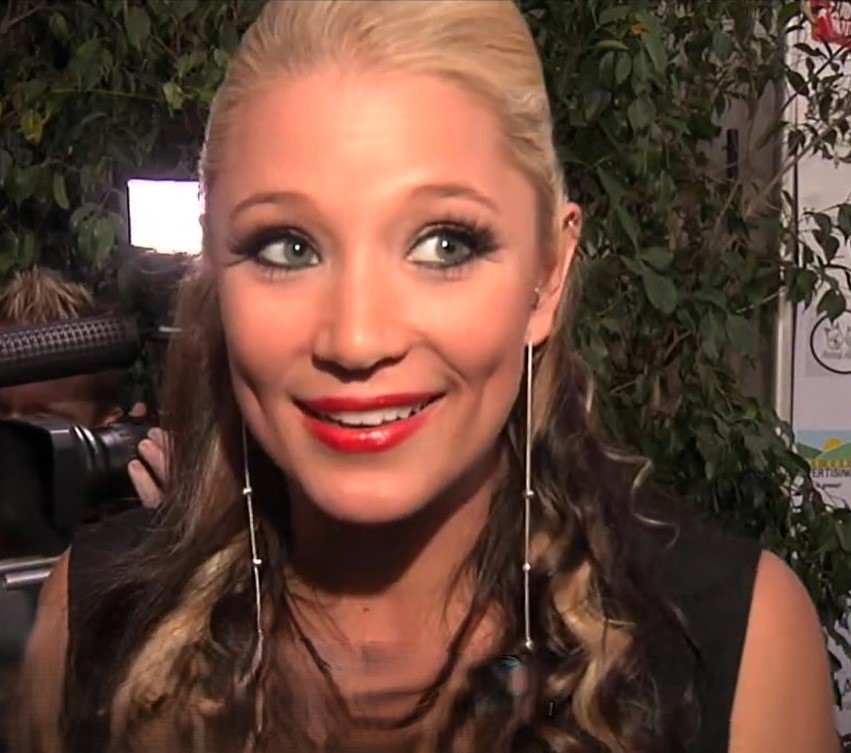
- Renton interviewed in 2011
- Occupation: Actress
- Years active: 2001–present

Kristen Renton is an American actress who had a recurring role as Ima Tite on Sons of Anarchy and also portrayed Morgan Hollingsworth on NBC's soap opera Days of Our Lives.

== Career ==
At the age of 16, Renton started a career in modeling, and later got into acting. She has appeared in the films Ghouls, In the Mix, and Come Away Home. She has also made appearances on television, in such series as CSI: NY, The OC and The Glades.

== Filmography ==
Film
Year	Film	Role	Notes
2005	Come Away Home	Ashley Green	
2005	In the Mix	Skye	
2008	Ghouls	Jennifer	TV
2012	Meant to Be	Shelly	
2020	American Zombieland	Tiffany	
2020	The Crickets Dance	Angie Lawrence	
2021	T11 Incomplete	Laura	
2024	First Shift	Angela Dutton	
2025	Run	Julia	
TBA	First Shift: Vengeance	Angela Dutton	Post-production
TBA	First Shift: Redemption	Angela Dutton	Post-production
Television
Year	Title	Role	Notes
2001–2002	The Sausage Factory	Nancy	13 episodes
2002	The Andy Dick Show	Sara	Episode: "Coconut Monkey Bank"
2002	Maybe It's Me	Unknown	Episode: "The Lab Partner"
2002	Scratch & Burn	Kate	Episode: Johnny's Big Score
2004	The OC	Jenn	Episode: "The Strip"
2005	CSI: NY	Melanie Dobson	Episode: "YoungBlood"
2007–2008	Days of Our Lives	Morgan Hollingsworth	83 episodes
2009–2013	Sons of Anarchy	Ima Tite	12 episodes
2010	CSI: Miami	Courtney Alderman	Episode: "Reality Kills"
2012–2014	Anger Management	Allie	Episodes: "Charlie Dates Kate's Patient" and "Charlie & the Return of the Danger Girl"
2012	The Glades	Stella Adams	Episode: "Close Encounters"
