= Rampage: Capital Punishment =

- DVD cover
- Directed by: Uwe Boll
- Written by: Uwe Boll
- Produced by: Natalie Tudge
- Starring: Brendan Fletcher; Lochlyn Munro; Mike Dopud; Michaela Mann
- Cinematography: Mathias Neumann
- Edited by: Kelvin Tseng
- Music by: Jessica de Rooij
- Production companies: Boll Kino Beteiligungs GmbH & Co.
- Distributed by: Event Film Distribution; Phase 4 Films
- Release date: August 19, 2014
- Running time: 93 minutes
- Countries: United States; Canada; Germany
- Language: English
- Box office: $258,910

Rampage: Capital Punishment (originally titled Rampage: You End Now) is a 2014 action film and a direct sequel to the 2009 film Rampage. It is directed by Uwe Boll and was released on August 19, 2014. A third film in the series was released in 2016, Rampage: President Down.

== Plot ==
After committing his rampage in Tenderville, Oregon, Bill Williamson disappeared and has been living off the grid for years with the money he stole from a bank during the massacre. The video recording of his rants about violent population control has since garnered millions of views and turned Bill into an Internet sensation. In the present day, Bill uses the stolen money to finance yet another killing spree, purchasing a number of weapons, including two fully automatic, military-grade Mk 18 Mod 0 carbines, and constructing homemade explosives. After making final preparations for the killing spree, Bill shaves his head clean, dons his suit of body armor, and sets the interior of his house on fire. He drives to an alleyway and uses its cover to shoot several random pedestrians undetected, before trying to enter a bingo hall, only to leave after finding it is closed.

Bill then travels to the WK7 television station in D.C., where he blows up his car and enters the building. Inside, he shoots the security guard and several employees with the carbines. He then holds the survivors, including news anchorman Chip Parker, hostage and forces them into a basement at gunpoint. He kills one of the hostages when he disregards one of his orders. Bill later gives Chip a disc and instructs him to go upstairs and air the disc's contents nationwide, then return with a camera crew so they can do a live interview with him. Chip agrees and leaves the basement, where he relays his instructions to the responding police officers. However, while trying to air the disc, he accidentally slips and breaks it. He returns to the basement and tells Bill what had happened, and an agitated Bill gives him a duplicate of the disc.

While Chip is gone, Bill criticizes one of the hostages for her personal life before killing her. He is then confronted by another hostage, who reveals herself to be the sister of one of the people he killed at Tenderville. When she expresses her intent to kill him, Bill forces a reluctant male hostage to beat her. Eventually, the contents of the disc are aired on live TV; in it, Bill rants in a video recording about how the current system is flawed and that the U.S. government is manipulating American citizens and events for the sake of wealth. The video ends with Bill appealing to the American people to retaliate violently against politicians and the wealthy in order to restore society. Meanwhile, the officers manage to contact Bill's father with the intention of using him to appeal to Bill.

Chip returns to the basement with a camera crew, including an undercover police officer, and gives Bill a cellphone with his father on the other end. Mr. Williamson tries to appeal to Bill, then reveals his mother died after a car accident, as a result of medication she had been taking for depression following Bill's first killing spree and disappearance. At that moment, Bill becomes suspicious of the undercover officer and kills him, then abruptly ends the conversation with his father. Using hidden security cameras he implanted earlier, he notices SWAT teams converging on the basement and remotely detonates explosives, killing or incapacitating the officers. At Chip's urging, Bill begins the live interview, during which he becomes more specific about his rants in the disc and also espouses his views on killing innocent people. Asked if he regrets not being there when his mother died, he gets visibly upset but replies that his aim is bigger than family, and that it is about the survival of humanity. He then reveals his intention to die along with Chip before shooting him in the arm and releasing the other hostages.

Bill immediately engages a SWAT team in a shootout before fleeing into the building's ventilation system, leaving behind a gas bomb. Just as the SWAT team discovers the bomb, it detonates, destroying the entire station and killing everyone inside (128 in total), including Chip and the officers. Bill is then shown alive and well, watching a report on the station's destruction on his phone. As he does this, he spots a young girl reading a book and criticizes her for reading one, telling her she has been brainwashed with lies by the system. Bill then gives her a Beretta 92 pistol and instructs her to use it to kill her parents and then herself before sending her off with a look of satisfaction on his face.

== Cast ==
- Brendan Fletcher as Bill Williamson
- Lochlyn Munro as Chip Parker
- Mike Dopud as Marc
- Michaela Mann as Marlene
- Bruce Blain as The Homeless Guy
- John Sampson as John
- Nathan Lehfeldt as Office Guy/SWAT Guy
- Uwe Boll as Andy the Producer (uncredited)
- Matt Frewer as Mr. Williamson (voice; uncredited)

== Reception ==
=== Box office ===
Rampage: Capital Punishment grossed $204,342 in Oman, $42,974 in United Arab Emirates and $11,594 in Bahrain, with a worldwide gross of $258,910.

=== Critical response ===
C.H. Newell of Father Son Holy Gore gave the film 2.5 stars out of 5 and stated, "Boll doesn't manage to capture much of what made the first film so unexpectedly enjoyable. It comes off as forced, even with a couple well designed and executed sequences." Patrick Cooper of Bloody Disgusting gave the film a mixed review and stated, "Rampage 2 is actually more preachy than its predecessor, with Williamson’s rants touching on basically every shitty thing wrong in our society today. With the broader range in gripes, I would’ve preferred a bigger setting than the first, rather than the cramped TV studio."

== Sequel ==
Funds for a third film, entitled Rampage 3: No Mercy, were being raised by Boll through the crowdfunding website Indiegogo. According to him, the second film didn't garner enough interest to warrant another sequel being funded and he needed the help from crowd funding to complete the trilogy. The goal of the campaign was to raise $100,000 in funding. Boll also noted that even $50,000 in donations will guarantee that the film will be made. However, the campaign failed, raising only $6,375 of the $100,000 goal. Afterwards, Boll restarted his fundraising for the film on Kickstarter with a lowered goal of €50,000. However, with the new campaign not raising enough funding, Boll released two videos on YouTube, ranting against the fanbase and Hollywood as well as announcing that the third film will begin shooting in January 2016.
