= Philip Koch =

American artist

Philip Koch (born 30 March 1948) is professor emeritus at the Maryland Institute College of Art and an American realist painter whose landscapes are heavily influenced by the work of Edward Hopper. Since 1983, Koch has spent summers in residency at Hopper's studio on Cape Cod.

Art museums all over the US hold Koch's work in their permanent collections and he has had seventeen solo museum exhibitions, most recently at the Ogunquit Museum of American Art.
