= Ari Taub (director) =

American film director and producer

- Born: September 27, 1965 (age 60); New York City, New York, U.S.
- Occupations: Film director, film producer

Ari Taub (born September 27, 1965) is an American movie director, producer, and editor. Taub was born in New York City.

Taub is best known for his movie The Fallen, a 2004 war film about the perspectives of Italian, German, and American soldiers during World War II.

Taub's latest movie is '79 Parts (2019), a comedy set in 1979, starring Eric Roberts.

Taub also produced Stanley Cuba (2007), a parody of Stanley Kubrick films, starring Mike Birbiglia and directed by Per Anderson.

== Filmography ==
- On Time (short) (1987)
- The Red Herring (short) (1988)
- Harold Swerg (short) (with Ralph Soll) (1988)
- Writer's Block (short) (1996)
- Letters from the Dead (2003)
- The Fallen (2004)
- Last Letters from Monte Rosa (2010)
- Life on the Edge of Town (short) (2010)
- 2010 Fairies Fatale (short) (2010)
- The Flying Ass Monkeys (TV series) (2012)
- The Final Sacrifice (2016)
- 79 Parts (2019)

== Awards and nominations ==
Year	Award	Category	Nominated work	Result
2005	Milan International Film Festival	Audience Award	The Fallen	Won
2005	Milan International Film Festival	Best Director	The Fallen	Won
2004	Bearfest – Big Bear Lake International Film Festival	Audience Award	The Fallen	Won
2003	Brooklyn International Film Festival	Chamelon	Letters from the Dead	Won
1998	New York International Independent Film & Video Festival	Short Film Award	Writer's Block	Won
1991	Barcelona Film Festival	Jury Prize	On Time	Won
1991	CINE Competition	CINE Golden Eagle	Harold Swerg	Won (shared with producer, writer, and editor)
1991	Sacramento Festival of Cinema	Outstanding Short	The Red Herring	Won
1988	First Run Festival	Award of Excellence	The Red Herring	Won
1987	First Run Festival	Award of Excellence	On Time	Won
