= Auschwitz (film) =

2011 German film by Uwe Boll

- UK DVD cover
- Directed by: Uwe Boll
- Written by: Uwe Boll
- Produced by: Sandra Basso; Uwe Boll; Dan Clarke; Jonathan Shore
- Starring: Uwe Boll; Steffen Mennekes; Arved Birnbaum
- Cinematography: Mathias Neumann
- Edited by: Charles Ladmiral
- Music by: Jessica de Rooij
- Distributed by: Boll World Sales
- Release date: 13 February 2011
- Running time: 73 minutes
- Country: Germany
- Languages: English; German

Auschwitz is a 2011 German drama film directed by Uwe Boll.

== Plot ==
The film attempts to depict the harsh reality of the process inside the Nazi Germany Auschwitz concentration camp by using brutal imagery. Book-ended by documentary footage as well as interviews with German teenagers about what they know about the Holocaust, Boll's intention is to show viewers just how depraved and sadistic life in the camp was.

== Cast ==
- Steffen Mennekes as SS Guard
- Arved Birnbaum as SS Camp Commander
- Nik Goldman as Prisoner
- Alexis Wawerka as Oven prisoner
- Maximilian Gärtner as Young Boy
- Harold Levy as Dentist prisoner
- Uwe Boll as Nazi officer outside gas chamber

== Production ==
Boll shot the film in 2010 from February to March in Zagreb, Croatia. Auschwitz was filmed on the set of BloodRayne: The Third Reich.

== Release ==
The film premiered on 13 February 2011 in Berlin. A number of critics boycotted the release for being "too gruesome".

Boll also filed a lawsuit against the Berlin International Film Festival (the Berlinale) in 2011 as he objected to paying the €125 entry fee, stating "I don't believe the Berlinale handles all films fairly. Kosslick has his deals with the major studios and invites his old pals from the Filmstiftung days. There isn't fair competition".
