= Rampage: President Down =

2016 action thriller film by Uwe Boll

- DVD cover
- Directed by: Uwe Boll
- Written by: Uwe Boll; Brendan Fletcher
- Produced by: Uwe Boll; Natalie Boll
- Starring: Brendan Fletcher; Crystal Lowe
- Cinematography: Mathias Neumann
- Edited by: K.T. Skaha
- Music by: Pale Christian Thomas; Lars Anderson
- Production companies: Amok III Productions; Studio West Productions VCC
- Distributed by: Sony Pictures Entertainment
- Release date: September 6, 2016
- Running time: 100 minutes
- Country: Canada
- Language: English
- Budget: $750,000

Rampage: President Down is a 2016 Canadian action thriller film directed by Uwe Boll.

It is the third film in Boll's Rampage series and a sequel to Rampage (2009) and Rampage: Capital Punishment (2014), also directed by Boll. Four years later, Boll announced that a fourth Rampage film was in development.

== Plot ==
Three years after his second killing spree at WK7 TV station in Washington D.C. (following which he was presumed dead in a massive explosion), Bill Williamson returns from hiding and, using a sniper rifle, assassinates the President of the United States, as well as the Vice President and the Secretary of Defense (which happens off-camera).

While hiding in his cabin in the nearby woods, Bill taunts the authorities and prepares for a final confrontation, expecting to die as a self-proclaimed martyr for his cause. In the climax, he engages in a prolonged firefight, killing numerous police officers, SWAT units, and FBI agents before being fatally wounded. His death, however, sparks widespread unrest across the United States, as thousands of supporters act upon his earlier video messages urging violent resistance against the wealthy and elite. The film concludes with a news broadcast reporting on the nationwide shootings and chaos, which is abruptly interrupted when the homeless man from the previous film attacks the station. Facing the camera, he declares that Williamson changed his life before shooting the lens.

== Cast ==
- Brendan Fletcher as Bill Williamson
- Steve Baran as FBI Agent James Molokai
- Ryan McDonell as FBI Agent Vincent Jones
- Scott Patey as FBI Agent Murray
- Crystal Lowe as Bill's Girlfriend
- Loretta Walsh as WK7 News Reporter #1
- Zain Meghji as WK7 News Reporter #2
- Bruce Blain as Homeless Man
- Anthony Rogers as FBI Agent

== Production ==
Boll attempted to crowdfund the film, originally titled Rampage 3: No Mercy, via Indiegogo and Kickstarter. In January 2015, the Indiegogo campaign closed after raising only $6,375 of a requested $100,000. In June 2015, the Kickstarter campaign raised $29,746 of a requested $55,794. Boll posted a series of two profanity-laced videos on YouTube in response, with one of the videos calling crowdfunding "absolutely dead" to him, and another wishing death upon several Hollywood celebrities.

Filming took place in January 2016, in Langley and Maple Ridge, British Columbia, Canada. The film's budget was $750,000.
