= Run (2025 film) =

- Theatrical release poster
- Directed by: Uwe Boll
- Written by: Uwe Boll
- Produced by: Uwe Boll; Boris Velican; Michael Roesch; Hrvoje Habeković
- Starring: Amanda Plummer; James Russo; Ulrich Thomsen; Barkhad Abdi
- Cinematography: Mathias Neumann
- Edited by: Ethan Maniquis
- Music by: Maarten Buning; Stan Koch
- Production companies: Elementree Productions; Borvel Film
- Distributed by: Quiver Distribution
- Release dates: October 17, 2025 (Obscura Film Festival); November 14, 2025 (United States)
- Running time: 97 minutes
- Countries: Germany; Croatia; Canada; United States
- Languages: English; Italian

Run is a 2025 thriller film written and directed by Uwe Boll and starring Amanda Plummer, James Russo, Ulrich Thomsen and Barkhad Abdi.

== Cast ==
- Amanda Plummer as Anna
- James Russo as Eddie
- Daniel Sauli as Cappi
- Kristen Renton as Julia
- Ulrich Thomsen as Matt
- Barkhad Abdi as Ismael
- Costas Mandylor as Boss
- Mohammed Qissi as Abdul
- Sammy Sheik as Idris
- Marcus Henderson as Oumar
- Daniele Favilli as Mayor Marcelo Gadi
- Désirée Giorgetti as Police Clerk

== Production ==
In February 2024, it was announced that Sauli, Renton, Sheik and Qissi were cast in the film. In April 2024, it was announced that Plummer, Russo, Thomsen, Henderson, Abdi and Mandylor were also cast in the film.

The film was shot entirely in Baška, Croatia. Filming wrapped in May 2024.

== Release ==
The film's international sales are handled by UTA Independent Film Group and is currently in negotiations for a U.S. release. In September 2025, Quiver Distribution acquired North American and U.K. distribution rights to the film, and released it on digital on November 14. The film premiered at the Obscura Film Festival on October 17.
