= Rampage (2009 film) =

- German poster
- Directed by: Uwe Boll
- Written by: Uwe Boll
- Produced by: Uwe Boll; Dan Clarke; Shawn Williamson
- Starring: Brendan Fletcher; Michael Paré; Shaun Sipos; Lynda Boyd; Robert Clarke
- Cinematography: Mathias Neumann
- Edited by: Thomas Sabinsky
- Music by: Jessica de Rooij
- Production companies: Brightlight Pictures; Pitchblack Pictures
- Distributed by: Event Film Distribution
- Release dates: August 14, 2009 (Phantasmagoria Film Festival); September 27, 2009 (Fantastic Fest); April 29, 2010 (Germany)
- Running time: 85 minutes
- Countries: Canada; Germany
- Language: English

Rampage is a 2009 action thriller film written and directed by Uwe Boll and starring Brendan Fletcher, Michael Paré, Shaun Sipos and Lynda Boyd. Having received a theatrical release in Germany, it was released direct-to-video in the rest of the world. It was Boll's first film to gain mainly positive reviews. The film was followed by two sequels Rampage: Capital Punishment (2014) and Rampage: President Down (2016).

== Plot ==
In the fictional town of Tenderville, Oregon, 23-year-old Bill Williamson is living with his parents and working as a low-paid mechanic. He feels bombarded by the problems of the world, by ubiquitous TV sets and radios, and by the outspoken political views of 21-year-old Evan Drince, who seems to be his sole friend. Bill's parents ask him to move out. He leaves for work, stops to get coffee along the way, and argues with the shop owner when he is dissatisfied with his coffee. At work, his boss interrupts him while Bill is working on a personal vehicle off the clock. The boss then dismisses Bill's request for a raise condescendingly.

Back at home, Bill prints out fake money and then constructs a suit of abrasion resistant steel body armor, complete with a ballistic helmet and a paintball mask. Armed with two SMGs, two semi-auto pistols, and two knives, he heads downtown. First, he incapacitates the police by car-bombing their headquarters with a remote-controlled, bomb-laden van. He then walks through the streets, shooting people at random with the SMGs, and stops to taunt and shoot the coffee shop owner. Two police officers open fire on him, but his armor blocks the bullets, and he kills both officers. He enters a salon where multiple women are sheltering and takes off his mask in order to get a drink before leaving without shooting anyone, but then returns after realizing he revealed his identity to the salon occupants, all of whom he kills.

Bill goes unnoticed into a bingo parlor, orders a sandwich, harasses the host, and leaves without shooting anyone, believing the elderly patrons are already close enough to dying. He then enters a local bank, killing the security guard before shooting some of the employees and customers who attempt to subdue him. He proceeds to rob the bank, forcing the manager to empty a safe full of money into a plastic trash bag. Outside the bank, he secretly switches the money he stole with his fake money and burns the bag in a trash can, shouting that money is worthless and causes the problems of the world.

After killing a restaurant waitress with whom Evan had previously argued, Bill calls Evan, who is in a forest nearby, expecting him for a mano-a-mano paintball competition. Bill drives to the forest and is pursued by several police officers, led by Sheriff Melvoy. Bill kills most of the officers with explosives and flees into the forest, pursued by Melvoy, the only surviving policeman. When he arrives at the forest, Bill ambushes Melvoy, stabbing him and leaving him to die. Finding Evan, Bill immobilizes him with a stun gun and then stages a suicide by placing one of his pistols in Evan's hand and shooting him in the head. Bill puts the armor suit and weapons on Evan's corpse, leaves the forest, and burns the remaining evidence.

Bill then returns home before his parents arrive with horror stories about the killings in town. While they are conversing in front of the TV, news stations report that they have identified the killer as Evan, and that at least 93 people have been killed in the rampage. In his room, while packing his belongings and the stolen bank money, Bill hears a local TV news report that police have arrested Evan's father, an activist during the Vietnam War era, who is claiming the innocence of his son and accusing Bill of the crime. Bill fills a briefcase with the stolen money and prepares to leave. The story concludes with a home video of Bill announcing his departure on a personal quest to unknown whereabouts, to further reduce the world's population. A text indicates that Bill disappeared from that point on, and two years later, his video recording was found on the Internet.

== Cast ==
- Brendan Fletcher as Bill Williamson
- Michael Paré as Sheriff Melvoy
- Shaun Sipos as Evan Drince
- Lynda Boyd as Sarah Williamson, Bill's Mom
- Robert Clarke as Evan's Father
- Matt Frewer as Alan Williamson, Bill's Dad
- Katey Grace as Bank Teller
- Brent Hodge as Bingo Hall Server
- Katharine Isabelle as Beauty Staff #2
- Malcolm Stewart as Bank Manager
- Pale Christian Thomas as Gelato Server
- Michaela Mann as Waitress

== Production ==
Parts of Rampage were filmed in Langley, British Columbia, on a stretch of Fraser Highway that cuts directly through the city centre.

== Release ==
While receiving a theatrical opening in Boll's native Germany, the film is a direct-to-video project in the US and was released on DVD and Blu-ray Disc on June 1, 2010, by Phase 4 Films.

== Reception ==
Rampage received several positive reviews. Comments were made expressing surprise at the positive reviews the film received, as Uwe Boll's previous films had been poorly reviewed by critics. /Film gave the film 7 out of 10, stating "Even a broken clock is right two times a day. And it was bound to happen eventually. Uwe Boll has made a good movie. Not a great movie, but a decent film." Film.com stated "I can’t believe the words I’m about to type (...) Uwe Boll’s latest film (...) is good. Very good." The film received 3½ stars out of 5 from Bloody Disgusting, who praised Uwe Boll's "evolution" in style, "almost as if the German Ed Wood has taken a deep look into the mirror, reflected on his films, and made a turn for the better". Peter Debruge of Variety gave the film a negative review, calling it "uncompromising and nearly unwatchable (as much for its subject as for its nauseating visual style)". Scott Foy of Dread Central gave the film 3.5 stars out 5 and stated, "Uwe Boll can be a little less angry today knowing he has crafted a solid, tension-filled, original thriller about subject matter that few filmmakers would dare even touch. Congratulations, Dr. Boll, you've silenced many of your critics."

== Sequels ==
On January 9, 2014, The Hollywood Reporter revealed that Uwe Boll had begun development of a sequel to Rampage, featuring the return of Brendan Fletcher as Bill Williamson. The plot involves Williamson holding a television station hostage as a political platform. Featured alongside Fletcher are actors Lochlyn Munro, Mike Dopud, and Michaela Ross. Natalia Tudge is the film's producer. A teaser for the film was released on January 31, 2014. The film was later revealed to be titled Rampage: Capital Punishment and was released on August 19, 2014. A third film called Rampage: President Down was released in 2016.
