= The Sausage Factory =

- Also known as: MTV's Now What; Much Ado About Whatever
- Genre: Comedy
- Created by: Henry Pincus
- Starring: Adam Brody; Kenny Fisher; Adam Frost; Johnny K. Lewis; Kristen Renton; Andi Eystad
- Opening theme: Brown – Satellite
- Ending theme: Brown – Satellite
- Composers: Ari Wise & Brian Carson
- Countries of origin: Canada; United States
- Original language: English
- No. of seasons: 1
- No. of episodes: 13

Production
- Executive producers: Danny Kallis; Michael Hirsh; Patrick Loubert; Stephen Hodgins; Timothy Gamble; John Miller; Jessica Swirnoff
- Producers: Stephen Foster; Jeny Quine; Dan Signer
- Editor: Stuart Bass
- Running time: 25 minutes
- Production companies: PeaceArch Entertainment; Nelvana Limited

Original release
- Network: The Comedy Network (Canada); MTV (USA)
- Release: November 26, 2001 – May 29, 2002

The Sausage Factory, also known in the United States as MTV's Now What? or Much Ado About Whatever, is a teen sitcom that followed the lives of four friends in their junior year at West Boulder High School.

The four friends were Zack (Adam Brody), trying to win over his unrequited crush Lisa; Ted, the stereotypical rich kid who tries to consummate with his girlfriend, Nancy (Kristen Renton); J.C. (Kenny Fisher), who finds himself constantly approached by middle-aged women; and Gilby (Johnny Lewis), the class clown, who regularly creates trouble.

Produced in 2000 and 2001, it ran for one season. The single-camera series was shot without an audience and included no laugh track.

Originally aired in Canada on The Comedy Network, reruns were later screened on CTV and YTV. In the United Kingdom and Ireland, it airs on Trouble. Sky One previously aired it.

== Cast ==
- Adam Brody as Zack
- Kenny Fisher as J.C.
- Adam Nicholas Frost as Ted
- Johnny K. Lewis as Gilby
- Kristen Renton as Nancy
- Andi Eystad as Lisa

== Episodes ==
No.	Title	Directed by	Written by	Original release date
1	"Election"	Ron Oliver	Howard Nemetz	November 26, 2001 (Canada); April 6, 2002 (USA)
2	"Running Free"	Ron Oliver	Marc Abrams & Mike Benson	December 3, 2001 (Canada); April 13, 2002 (USA)
3	"The Tux"	Richard Martin	Danny Kallis	December 10, 2001 (Canada); April 20, 2002 (USA)
4	"Gilby's Millions"	Anthony Atkins	Marc Abrams & Mike Benson	December 17, 2001 (Canada); April 27, 2002 (USA)
5	"Community Impact"	Richard Martin	Adam Lapidus	December 24, 2001 (Canada); May 4, 2002 (USA)
6	"Hang Ups"	Ron Oliver	Jeny Quine	January 7, 2002 (Canada); May 11, 2002 (USA)
7	"Purity Test"	Henry Pincus	Henry Pincus	January 14, 2002 (Canada); May 13, 2002 (USA)
8	"Good Ted Hunting"	Henry Pincus	Dan Signer	January 21, 2002 (Canada); May 21, 2002 (USA)
9	"Sex, Guys and Videotape"	Richard Martin	Jeny Quine	January 28, 2002 (Canada); May 22, 2002 (USA)
10	"JC, the Gay Model"	Ron Oliver	Danny Kallis and Henry Pincus	February 4, 2002 (Canada); May 23, 2002 (USA)
11	"Dances with Squirrels"	Milan Cheylov	Danny Kallis and Henry Pincus	February 11, 2002 (Canada); May 11, 2002 (USA)
12	"Zack's Little Problem"	John Pozer	Jeny Quine	February 18, 2002 (Canada); May 28, 2002 (USA)
13	"Reality Bites"	James Marshall	Howard Nemetz & Adam Lapidus	February 25, 2002 (Canada); May 29, 2002 (USA)
