= First Run Film Festival =

The First Run Film Festival is an annual New York University Tisch School of the Arts event that presents advanced film work by the school's graduate and undergraduate students. The event first ran in 1986. The selection runs a gamut of undergraduate and graduate films ranging between narratives, documentaries and animation produced during the filmmakers' time in the program. The work is evaluated by a trio of juries: a three-judge Undergraduate Intermediate panel looks at submissions from junior level courses; the Graduate Industry and Undergraduate Industry panels each have six judges. The selections are then sent toward the respective faculty panels to announce the final top three winners.

This annual week-long festival begins with the Craft Awards Ceremony and Wasserman Finalists Announcement and culminates with the Wasserman Awards Ceremony featuring the Charles and Lucille King Family Foundation Awards. The students' films and videos compete annually for over $50,000 in cash awards. Following First Run each year, the Wasserman Award finalist films and videos are screened in Hollywood for industry professionals and the public. Past years' showcases had been held at the Directors Guild of America.
