= O Canada (TV series) =

Anthology series of Canadian cartoons

- Created by: Bob Jaques; Kelly Armstrong; Glen Kennedy
- Starring: Sally Grace
- Countries of origin: Canada; United States
- Original language: English

Production
- Running time: 30 minutes
- Production companies: Cartoon Network Productions; National Film Board of Canada

Original release
- Network: Cartoon Network
- Release: 1997 – 2002

Related
- Bob and Margaret

O Canada is an adult animated television anthology series produced by and aired on Cartoon Network. O Canada was the first Canadian cartoon series to air on Cartoon Network. The show also aired in Canada on Teletoon. It features animated short films produced on Canada, including but not limited to adult animation.

Shown mainly on Sunday nights (early Monday mornings) at 12:00 midnight ET, O Canada featured a selection of animated shorts from Canada, mostly from the archives of the National Film Board of Canada. Some of the animated shorts featured were part of the NFB's Canada Vignettes collection of shorts first produced for CBC Television.

The title of the series originated from the name of Canada's national anthem, "O Canada".

One of the notable shorts featured in this series was Bob's Birthday, which would later serve as the basis for Comedy Central / Global Television Network's Bob and Margaret series, which would debut the following year. Despite its time slot, Bob's Birthday was censored with one scene, that featured Bob nude from the waist down, edited with a maple leaf electronically superimposed over his genitalia while other mature themes remain uncensored.

In 1997, Charles Solomon of TV Guide added this packaged series on the adult animated shows list and described it "a must for animation aficionados". Cartoon Network's deal with NFB had since expired in 2002 in favor of Adult Swim.

== Shorts shown on O Canada ==
- The Apprentice (L'Apprenti)
- Arkelope
- Balablok
- Begone Dull Care (Note: This short aired once on Labor Day in 1997.)
- The Big Snit
- Blackfly
- Blowhard
- Bob's Birthday (Note: This short originally contains nudity, which was superimposed for television airings.)
- Cactus Swing
- The Cat Came Back
- Deadly Deposits
- The Dingles
- Dinner for Two
- Emergency Numbers
- Every Child
- Every Dog's Guide to Complete Home Safety
- Every Dog's Guide to the Playground
- Evolution
- The Family That Dwelt Apart
- George and Rosemary
- Get a Job
- Getting Started
- Hot Stuff
- Hunger
- La Salla
- The Log Driver's Waltz
- The Lump
- No Problem
- Oh Sure
- Overdose
- Pig Bird
- Propaganda Message
- Scant Sanity
- Shyness
- Special Delivery
- Strange Invaders
- Strings
- The Sweater
- The Tender Tale of Cinderella Penguin
- To Be
- Two Sisters
- When the Day Breaks
