= 9th Gemini Awards =

1995 awards for Canadian television

- Date: March 5, 1995
- Venue: Metro Toronto Convention Centre
- Hosted by: Paul Gross, Tina Keeper

Television/radio coverage
- Network: CBC Television

The Academy of Canadian Cinema & Television's 9th Gemini Awards were held on March 5, 1995 to honour achievements in Canadian television. The awards show, which was hosted by Paul Gross and Tina Keeper, took place at the Metro Toronto Convention Centre and was broadcast on CBC Television.

== Winners and nominees ==
The following are the winners and nominees of the 9th annual Gemini Awards. Winners appear first and highlighted in bold.

Best Dramatic Series

- **Due South** – Alliance Communications. Producers: Jeff King, Paul Haggis, Kathy Slevin
- Road to Avonlea – Sullivan Entertainment. Producers: Trudy Grant, Kevin Sullivan
- Street Legal- Canadian Broadcasting Corporation. Producers: Nadia Harcourt, Duncan Lamb, Helen Kafka, Chris Paton
- Neon Rider – Virtue/Rekert Productions, Atlantis Films. Producers: Winston Rekert, Danny Virtue, Michael MacMillan
- E.N.G. – Atlantis Communications. Producers: Jennifer Black, David Barlow
- Destiny Ridge – Great North Productions. Producers: Mary Kahn, Larry Raskin, Andy Thomson

Best Short Dramatic Program

- **Something to Cry About** – Swirling Storm Productions. Producer: Terry Steyn
- The Hidden Room – Dreams About Water – Hidden Room Productions. Producers: David Perlmutter, Lewis Chesler, Tab Baird, Adam Haight
- Sunday Arts Entertainment – The Perfect Pie – Canadian Broadcasting Corporation. Producers: Carol Moore-Ede, Robert Sherrin
- Survivors – Inner City Films. Producers: Alfons Adetuyi, Douglas Stewart, Stephen Turnbull, Claire Prieto

Best TV Movie

- **Due South** – Alliance Communications. Producers: Jeff King, Paul Haggis, Jean Desormeaux
- Life with Billy – Salter Street Films, The Film Works. Producers: Michael Donovan, Eric Jordan
- Heads – Credo Group, Sojourn Pictures, Atlantis Films. Producers: Jonathan Goodwill, Derek Mazur, Peter Sussman, Martin Tudor, Bill Gray
- For the Love of Aaron – Patterdale Productions. Producer: Anne Hopkins
- Coming of Age – Breakthrough Entertainment. Producers: Ira Levy, Peter Williamson, Barri Cohen

Best Music Variety Program or Series

- **Kurt Browning: You Must Remember This** – Canadian Broadcasting Corporation. Producers: John Brunton, Joan Tosoni, Sandra Bezic
- 1994 Canadian Country Music Awards – CTV Television Network. Producers: Gordon James, Ken Gibson
- Celine Dion: The Colour of My Love – Paragon Entertainment. Producers: Carol Reynolds, René Angélil, Richard Borchiver, Donald K. Donald
- Sing Out Freedom Train – Jim McKenna Teleshows, Global Television Network. Producer: Jim McKenna
- Ear to the Ground – Canadian Broadcasting Corporation. Producers: Sandra Faire, Faith Feingold

Best Comedy Program or Series

- **This Hour Has 22 Minutes** – Salter Street Films, Canadian Broadcasting Corporation. Producers: Geoff D'Eon, Michael Donovan, Jack Kellum, Gerald Lunz, Jenipher Ritchie
- The Kids in the Hall – Broadway Video, Canadian Broadcasting Corporation. Producers: John Blanchard, Lorne Michaels, Jeffrey Berman, Cindy Park, Jeff Ross
- Royal Canadian Air Farce – Canadian Broadcasting Corporation. Producers: Brian Robertson, Roger Abbott, Don Ferguson

Donald Brittain Award for Best Documentary Program

- **Shadows and Light: Joaquin Rodrigo at 90** – Rhombus Media. Producers: Larry Weinstein, Niv Fichman
- Hidden Children – TVOntario. Producer: Julia Sereny
- No Man's Land – Bishari Film Productions. Producer: Shelley Saywell
- Dream Tower – Sphinx Productions. Producer: Ron Mann
- Romeo and Juliet in Sarajevo – National Film Board of Canada. Producer: Virginia Storring

Best Documentary Series

- **Witness** – Canadian Broadcasting Corporation. Producer: Mark Starowicz
- Rough Cuts – Canadian Broadcasting Corporation. Producer: Jerry McIntosh
- The Nature of Things – Canadian Broadcasting Corporation. Producer: James Murray
- Canadian Wilderness Journal – K.E.G. Productions. Producer: Ralph C. Ellis

Best Dramatic Mini-Series

- **Dieppe** – Canadian Broadcasting Corporation. Producer: Bernard Zukerman

Best Performing Arts Program

- **Sunday Arts Entertainment – Walls** – Canadian Broadcasting Corporation. Producers: Carol Moore-Ede, Jeremy Podeswa
- The National Aboriginal Achievement Awards – Canadian Broadcasting Corporation. Producer: Chris Paton, John Kim Bell, Fred Nicolaidis
- Adrienne Clarkson Presents – Skin, Flesh and Bone – Canadian Broadcasting Corporation. Producer: Adrienne Clarkson
- Concierto de Aranjuez – Rhombus Media. Producers: Larry Weinstein, Niv Fichman

Best Information Series

- **the fifth estate** – Canadian Broadcasting Corporation. Producers: David Studer, Kelly Crichton
- W5 With Eric Malling – CTV. Producers: Peter Rehak, Mike Lavoie
- Venture – Canadian Broadcasting Corporation. Producers: Joy Crysdale, Linda Sims
- CBC Prime Time News – Canadian Broadcasting Corporation. Producers: Joan Anderson, Tony Burman

Best Information Segment

- **The Health Show – Scatology** – Canadian Broadcasting Corporation. Producers: Chris Mullington, Edmund Egan
- For the Love of the Game – Perfect Body?, Laura Binetti Segment – Television Renaissance. Producers: Morgan Elliott, Aiken Scherberger
- the fifth estate – No Safe Place – Canadian Broadcasting Corporation. Producers: Sarah Spinks, Christina Campbell
- the fifth estate – Missing: Presumed Safe – Canadian Broadcasting Corporation. Producers: Margaret Slaght, Dan Burke
- CBC Prime Time News – The Lakoubovski File – Canadian Broadcasting Corporation. Producers: Robin Benger, Patricia Chew

Best Lifestyle Series

- **On the Road Again** – Canadian Broadcasting Corporation. Producer: Paul Harrington
- 50/UP – Canadian Broadcasting Corporation. Producers: Shafik Obrai
- It's About Time – VisionTV. Producers: Sadia Zaman, Rita Deverell
- FashionTelevision – Chumcity. Producers: Moses Znaimer, Marcia Martin, Jay Levine
- Inquiring Minds – TVOntario. Producers: Chris Robinson, Michael Kinney

Best Animated Program or Series

- **ReBoot** – Mainframe Entertainment, Alliance Communications, BLT Productions. Producers: Christopher Brough, Ian Pearson, Jay Firestone
- Dog City – Nelvana, Jim Henson Productions. Producers: Michael Hirsh, Patrick Loubert, Clive A. Smith
- Christopher the Christmas Tree – Delaney & Friends Cartoon Productions. Producer: Chris Delaney

Best Youth Program or Series

- **Street Cents**- Canadian Broadcasting Corporation. Producers: John Nowlan, Jonathan Finkelstein, Barbara Kennedy
- Brainstorm – TVOntario. Producer: Janet Thomson
- For Angela – National Film Board of Canada. Producers: Nancy Trites Botkin, Joe MacDonald
- aidScare, aidsCare – Canadian Broadcasting Corporation. Producer: Lynn Harvey
- Ready or Not – Insight Productions. Producers: Alyse Rosenberg, John Brunton, Moira Holmes, Barbara Bowlby

Best Children's Program or Series

- **The Big Comfy Couch** – Radical Sheep Productions. Producers: Cheryl Wagner, Robert Mills
- Wild Side Show – Atlantis Films. Producers: Martin Katz, Ken Walz, Dale Burshtein
- Candles, Snow, and Mistletoe – Canadian Broadcasting Corporation. Producer: Lynn Harvey
- Fred Penner's Place – Canadian Broadcasting Corporation. Producer: Lesley Oswald
- The Biggest Little Ticket – Lyric Film & Video. Producers: Robert Lang, Peter Weyman

Best Sports Program or Series

- **Elvis: Airborne** – Silent J Entertainment, Baton Broadcast System. Producers: Morgan Earl, Cathryn McCartney, Edward Futerman
- The XVII Olympic Winter Games: Olympic Prime Time – Canadian Television Network. Producers: Doug Beeforth, John Shannon, Jim Marshall, John McLarty, Laura Mellanby
- Chasing the Dream – Ballpark Pictures. Producers: Peter Raymont, David Barlow, William Thomas
- Molson Hockey Night in Canada – Stanley Cup Final – Canadian Broadcasting Corporation. Producers: Ron G. Harrison, Larry Isaac
- Pumped! – Insight Productions. Producers: John Brunton, Dale Burshtein

Best Special Event Coverage

- **Election Night '93** – MuchMusic. Producer: Denise Donlon
- South African Election – Canadian Broadcasting Corporation. Producers: Slawko Klymkiw, Lynn Raineault, Edith Champagne
- Election '93 – Canadian Broadcasting Corporation. Producers: Arnold Amber, Tom Kavanagh, Elly Alboim, Michael Smith
- XV Commonwealth Games – Canadian Broadcasting Corporation. Producers: Bob Moir, Joan Mead

Best Direction in a Dramatic Program or Mini-Series

- **Paul Donovan** – Life with Billy (Salter Street Films/The Film Works)
- John N. Smith – Dieppe (CBC)
- John Kent Harrison – For the Love of Aaron (Patterdale Productions)
- Michael Anderson – Scales of Justice (CBC)
- Paul Lynch – RoboCop – The Future of Law Enforcement (Sky Vision)

Best Direction in a Dramatic or Comedy Series

- **George Bloomfield** – Due South – Free Willie (Alliance Communications)
- Don McBrearty – Road to Avonlea – Memento Mori (Sullivan Entertainment)
- Jerry Ciccoritti – North of 60 – Hostage (SEVEN24 Films)
- D.J. MacHale – Are You Afraid of the Dark? – The Tale of the Dangerous Soup (Cinar/YTV)
- Mario Azzopardi – RoboCop – The Human Factor (Sky Vision)

Best Direction in a Variety or Performing Arts Program or Series

- **Joan Tosoni** – Kurt Browning: You Must Remember This (CBC)
- Barbara Willis Sweete – The Sorceress: Kiri Te Kanawa (Rhombus Media/NOS Television)
- Joan Tosoni – Juno Awards of 1994 (CBC)
- Gilles Maheu – Adrienne Clarkson Presents – Skin, Flesh and Bone (CBC)
- Larry Weinstein – Concierto de Aranjuez (Rhombus Media)

Best Direction in an Information or Documentary Program or Series

- **Larry Weinstein** – Shadows and Light: Joaquin Rodrigo at 90 (Rhombus Media)
- Mark Starowicz – Red Capitalism (CBC)
- David Paperny – Witness – Dr Peter (CBC)
- Neil Docherty – the fifth estate – The Trouble With Evan (CBC)
- John Zaritsky – Romeo and Juliet in Sarajevo (NFB)
- Danièle Lacourse, Yvan Patry – Denial (Alter-Cine Productions)

Best Writing in a Dramatic Program or Mini-Series

- **Barry Stevens** – The Diary of Evelyn Lau (CBC)
- Thomas King, Ann McNaughton – Medicine River (Medicine River Productions)
- John Frizzell, Judith Thompson – Life with Billy (Salter Street Films/The Film Works)
- John Krizanc – Dieppe (CBC)
- Paul Haggis – Due South (Alliance Communications)

Best Writing in a Dramatic Series

- **Paul Haggis, Kathy Slevin** – Due South – Free Willie (Alliance Communications)
- Yan Moore – Road to Avonlea – Strictly Melodrama (Sullivan Entertainment)
- Jordan Wheeler – North of 60 – Raven (Seven24 Films)
- Hart Hanson – North of 60 – All Fall Down (Seven24 Films)
- William Gray – RoboCop – Inside Crime (Sky Vision)

Best Writing in a Comedy or Variety Program or Series

- **Cathy Jones, Rick Mercer, Alan Resnick, Greg Thomey, Mary Walsh** – This Hour Has 22 Minutes (Salter Street Films/CBC)
- Mike MacDonald – Mike MacDonald: Happy As I Can Be (Howard Lapides Productions)
- Dave Foley, Bruce McCulloch, Kevin McDonald, Mark McKinney, Scott Thompson, Diane Flacks, Norm Hiscock, Andy Jones, Garry Campbell, Paul Bellini, Brian Hartt – The Kids in the Hall (Broadway Video/CBC)
- Nick McKinney, Vito Viscomi, Paul Greenberg, Rob Gfroerer – The Vacant Lot – Episode #5 (Broadway Video/CBC)
- Jeremy Hotz, Bob Sorger – Comics! – What Ever Happened to Jeremy Hotz? (CBC)

Best Writing in an Information/Documentary Program or Series

- **Michael Ignatieff** – Blood and Belonging: Yugoslavia – The Road To Nowhere (TVOntario/Primedia Productions)
- Jack Bond, Morgan Earl – Elvis: Airborne (Silent J Entertainment/Baton Broadcast System)
- Mark Starowicz – Red Capitalism (CBC)
- Shelley Saywell – No Man's Land (Bishari Film Productions)
- Terence McKenna – CBC Prime Time News – The Inheritance (CBC)

Best Writing in a Children's or Youth Program or Series

- **Roger Fredericks, Louise Moon** – Street Cents – Hype(CBC)
- Richard Mortimer – aidScare, aidsCare (CBC)
- David Preston – Are You Afraid of the Dark? – The Tale of the Dream Girl (Cinar/YTV)
- Morton Ritts, Don Arioli, S.M. Molitor – The Busy World of Richard Scarry (Cinar Films)
- Leila Basen – Ready or Not – Am I Perverted or What? (Insight Productions)

Best Performance by an Actor in a Leading Role in a Dramatic Program or Mini-Series

- **Stephen McHattie** – Life with Billy (Salter Street Films/The Film Works)
- Maurice Godin – Just For Fun (Whistle Productions)
- Victor Garber – Dieppe (CBC)
- Gary Reineke – Dieppe (CBC)
- Bret Pearson – Something to Cry About (Swirling Storm Productions)

Best Performance by an Actress in a Leading Role in a Dramatic Program or Mini-Series

- **Nancy Beatty** – Life with Billy (Salter Street Films/The Film Works)
- Sandra Oh – The Diary of Evelyn Lau (CBC)
- Jennifer Tilly – Heads (Credo Group/Sojourn Pictures/Atlantis Films)
- Rebecca Jenkins – Harvest (Atlantis Films/Credo Group)
- Janet Bailey – Race to Freedom: The Underground Railroad (Atlantis Films))

Best Performance by an Actor in a Continuing Leading Dramatic Role

- **Paul Gross** – Due South – Free Willie (Alliance Communications)
- Cedric Smith – Road to Avonlea – Fathers and Sons (Sullivan Entertainment)
- Eric Peterson – Street Legal – No Holds Barred (CBC)
- Tom Jackson – North of 60 – Ciao Baby (Seven24 Films)
- David Marciano – Due South – Free Willie (Alliance Communications)

Best Performance by an Actress in a Continuing Leading Dramatic Role

- **Lally Cadeau** – Road to Avonlea – Strictly Melodrama (Sullivan Entertainment)
- Jackie Burroughs – Road to Avonlea – Memento Mori (Sullivan Entertainment)
- Cynthia Dale – Street Legal – Truth or Dare (CBC)
- Tina Keeper – North of 60 – Hostage (Seven24 Films)
- Tracey Cook – North of 60 – Crossing the River (Seven24 Films)

Best Performance by an Actor in a Guest Role in a Series

- **Bruce Greenwood** – Road to Avonlea – Stranger in the Night (Sullivan Entertainment)
- Robin Gammell – Street Legal – Fit Punishment (CBC)
- Clark Johnson – E.N.G. – The Cutting Edge (Atlantis Communications)
- Gordon Tootoosis – North of 60 – Crossing the River (Seven24 Films)
- James Kidnie – RoboCop – Inside Crime (Sky Vision)
- Christopher Babers – Due South – Free Willie (Alliance Communications)

Best Performance by an Actress in a Guest Role in a Series

- **Sarah Strange** – Neon Rider – Moving On, Part Two (Virtue/Rekert Productions/Atlantis Films)
- Linda Sorenson – Road to Avonlea – Strictly Melodrama (Sullivan Entertainment)
- Joyce Campion – Street Legal – No Holds Barred (CBC)
- Brenda Bazinet – Street Legal – The Cost of Love (CBC)
- Natalie Radford – E.N.G. – The Cutting Edge (Atlantis Communications)

Best Performance by an Actor in a Supporting Role

- **Bernard Behrens** – Coming of Age (Breakthrough Entertainment)
- Ron Lea – Street Legal – Truth, Lies and Consequences (CBC)
- Graham Harley – Dieppe (CBC)
- Aidan Devine – Dieppe (CBC)
- John Hemphill – Sodbusters (Atlantis Films/Bond Street Productions)

Best Performance by an Actress in a Supporting Role

- **Jennifer Phipps** – Coming of Age (Breakthrough Entertainment)
- Gema Zamprogna – Road to Avonlea – Thursday's Child (Sullivan Entertainment)
- Larissa Lapchinski – Dieppe (CBC)
- Tina Louise Bomberry – North of 60 – Harvest (Seven24 Films)
- Cynthia Belliveau – E.N.G. – Judgement of Solomon (Atlantis Communications)

Best Performance in a Comedy Program or Series

- **Cathy Jones, Rick Mercer, Greg Thomey, Mary Walsh** – This Hour Has 22 Minutes (Salter Street Films/CBC)
- Dan Redican – The Dan Redican Comedy Hour (Catalyst Entertainment/CBC)
- Tim Steeves – Comics! (CBC)
- Roger Abbott, Don Ferguson, Luba Goy, John Morgan – Royal Canadian Air Farce – April 15, 1994 (CBC)

Best Performance in a Variety Program or Series

- **Sarah McLachlan** – Sarah McLachlan Fumbling Towards Ecstasy (Fogel Sabourin Productions)
- Rita MacNeil – Rita MacNeil's Once Upon a Christmas (CBC)
- Celine Dion – Celine Dion: The Colour of My Love (Paragon Entertainment)
- Malcolm Hardee, Stephen Dowridge, Martin Soan – Just For Laughs – Episode 7 (Les Films Rozon)

Best Performance in a Performing Arts Program or Series

- **Holly Cole Trio** – Intimate and Interactive With Holly Cole Trio (MuchMusic)
- Ben Heppner – 1994 Governor General's Performing Arts Awards – Tribute Performance to Lois Marshall (CBC)
- Johanne Madore, Rodrigue Proteau – Adrienne Clarkson Presents – Skin, Flesh and Bone (CBC)

Best Performance in a Children's or Youth Program or Series

- **Laura Bertram** – Ready or Not (Insight Productions)
- Denny Doherty – Theodore Tugboat – George's Ghost (Cochran Entertainment)
- Tina Keeper – For Angela (NFB)
- Enuka Okuma – Madison – The Girl Most Likely (Forefront Entertainment)
- Shawn Ashmore – Guitarman (Guitarman Productions)

Gordon Sinclair Award for Broadcast Journalism

- **Linden MacIntyre** – the fifth estate (CBC)
- Hana Gartner – the fifth estate (CBC)
- Peter Mansbridge – CBC Prime Time News (CBC)
- Joe Schlesinger – CBC Prime Time News – The Inheritance (CBC)

Best Reportage

- **Anna Maria Tremonti** – CBC Prime Time News – War in Bosnia (CBC)
- Avis Favaro – CTV News – Tobacco Taxes vs. Lung Cancer (CTV)
- Robert Hurst – CTV News – Russian Election (CTV)
- Paul Workman – CBC Prime Time News – Hebron Killings (CBC)
- Don Murray – CBC Prime Time News – Russian Revolt (CBC)
- Diana Bishop – CTV News – Acid Victim (CTV)

Best Anchor or Interviewer

- **Linden MacIntyre** – the fifth estate (CBC)
- Michael Ignatieff – Blood and Belonging: Yugoslavia – The Road To Nowhere (TVOntario/Primedia Productions)
- Lloyd Robertson – CTV News – Decision '94 (CTV)
- Hana Gartner – the fifth estate (CBC)
- Pamela Wallin – CBC Prime Time News (CBC)

Best Host in a Lifestyle, Variety or Performing Arts Program or Series

- **Albert Schultz** – 1994 Gemini Awards (ACCTV Productions/Quality Shows)
- Wayne Rostad – On the Road Again (CBC)
- Bob Izumi – Bob Izumi's Real Fishing Show '94 – 24 Manitoba Monsters (Izumi's Outdoor)
- Tarzan Dan Freeman – Yaa! The 5th Annual YTV Achievement Awards (YTV)
- Hana Gartner – Contact With Hana Gartner – Preston & Sandra Manning/Dr. Benjamin Spock/Tattoo Expo (CBC)

Best Sportscaster

- **Dave Hodge** – TSN Inside Sports (TSN)
- Rod Black – World Basketball Championship: Canada vs. Greece (CTV)
- Ron Maclean – 1994 Commonwealth Games (CBC)
- Brian Williams – 1994 Commonwealth Games (CBC)

Best Photography in a Dramatic Program or Series

- **Rene Ohashi** – Race to Freedom: The Underground Railroad (Atlantis Films))
- Alar Kivilo – Heads (Credo Group/Sojourn Pictures/Atlantis Films)
- Mitchell Ness – Something to Cry About (Swirling Storm Productions)
- Rodney Charters – TekWar (Atlantis Films/Western International Communications/Lemli Productions/Universal Television/CTV Television Network/USA Network)
- Ron Stannett, Ron Orieux – Due South (Alliance Communications)

Best Photography in a Comedy, Variety or Performing Arts Program or Series

- **Maris Jansons** – Kurt Browning: You Must Remember This (CBC)
- Dennis Jones – 1994 Canadian Country Music Awards – CTV Television Network.
- Joost Dankelman – The Sorceress: Kiri Te Kanawa (Rhombus Media/NOS Television)
- David Franco, Yves Aucoin – Celine Dion: The Colour of My Love (Paragon Entertainment)
- Horst Zeidler – Concierto de Aranjuez (Rhombus Media)

Best Photography in an Information/Documentary Program or Series

- **Janet Foster, John Foster** – The Global Family – Clayoquot: The Sound of Wonder (TVOntario)
- Mitchell Ness – Lawn and Order (Lawn and Order Films)
- Paul Belanger – Wayne Rostad's Canada Day Special – Voices of the Wilderness (CBC)
- Michael Sweeney – CBC Prime Time News – One Last Chance for Belfast (CBC)
- Chris Gargus – CBC Evening News – Tall Ships (CBC)

Best Picture Editing in a Dramatic Program or Series

- **Jeff Warren** – The Diary of Evelyn Lau (CBC)
- Patrick Lussier – Heads (Credo Group/Sojourn Pictures/Atlantis Films)
- Robert Jackson – Something to Cry About (Swirling Storm Productions)
- Eric Goddard – Due South – Free Willie (Alliance Communications)
- David B. Thompson – Due South – Diefenbaker's Day Off (Alliance Communications)

Best Picture Editing in a Comedy, Variety or Performing Arts Program or Series

- **Lisa Regnier** – Kurt Browning: You Must Remember This (CBC)
- Paul Spencer – Imprint – Dub Poetry (TVOntario)
- Steve Jones – Sun and Moon: The Making of Miss Saigon and the Princess of Wales Theatre (CBC)
- Al Manson – Bryan Adams: Waking Up The Nation (CBC/Adams Communications)
- David New – Concierto de Aranjuez (Rhombus Media/ZDF)

Best Picture Editing in an Information/Documentary Program or Series

- **Mark Hajek** – Elvis: Airborne (Silent J Entertainment/Baton Broadcast System)
- Steve Tonon – Venture – Bank Battle (CBC)
- Steve Weslak – Lawn and Order (Lawn and Order Films)
- Mike Churchill, Mike Earles – The Magnificent One (TV EYE Entertainment)
- Richard Wells – Romeo and Juliet in Sarajevo (NFB)

Best Production Design or Art Direction

- **Russell Chick** – Kurt Browning: You Must Remember This (CBC)
- Roel Schneemann – The Sorceress: Kiri Te Kanawa (Rhombus Media/NOS Television)
- Michael Joy – Heads (Credo Group/Sojourn Pictures/Atlantis Films)
- Alicia Keywan, Armando Sgrignuoli – Scales of Justice (CBC)
- Stefan Roloff, Adam Kolodziej – TekWar (Atlantis Films/Western International Communications/Lemli Productions/Universal Television/CTV Television Network/USA Network)

Best Costume Design

- **Dinorah Iorio** – The Sorceress: Kiri Te Kanawa (Rhombus Media/NOS Television)
- Madeleine Stewart – Road to Avonlea (Sullivan Entertainment)
- Tulla Nixon – Dieppe (CBC)
- Frances Dafoe – Kurt Browning: You Must Remember This (CBC)
- Suzette Daigle – Due South – Free Willie (Alliance Communications)

Best Sound in a Dramatic Program or Series

- **Leon Johnson, Jacqueline Cristiani, Paul A. Sharpe, Dean Giammarco, Bill Sheppard** – Heads (Credo Group/Sojourn Pictures/Atlantis Films)
- Gerry King, Eric Fitz, Jim Hopkins, Penny Hozy, Joe Grimaldi – Dieppe (CBC)
- George Tarrant, Michael Macdonald, Randy Kiss, Kevin Townshend, Alan Perkins – North of 60 (Seven24 Films)
- Tom Mather, Barry Gilmore, Dale Sheldrake, Allen Ormerod, Lou Solakofski – Sodbusters (Atlantis Films/Bond Street Productions)
- Allen Ormerod, Todd Warren, Nelson Ferreira, Urmas Rosin, Michael Werth – Due South – Free Willie (Alliance Communications)

Best Sound in a Comedy, Variety or Performing Arts Program or Series

- **Onno Scholtze** – Concierto de Aranjuez (Rhombus Media/ZDF)
- Simon Bowers, Tom Bilenkey, Myroslav Bodnaruk, Peter Campbell – Kurt Browning: You Must Remember This (CBC)
- Jacques Comtois, Gary Oppenheimer, Myroslav Bodnaruk, Ray St. Sauveur, Eric Lemoyne – Adrienne Clarkson Presents – Skin, Flesh and Bone (CBC)
- Kevin Doyle, Doug McClement, Jon Ericson, Michael Kriz, Peter Hamilton – Prairie Oyster: Group Portrait (Insight Productions)

Best Sound in an Information/Documentary Program or Series

- **Onno Scholtze** – Shadows and Light: Joaquin Rodrigo at 90 (Rhombus Media)
- Brian Newby, Sergio Penhas-Roll – Man Alive – The Way of the Drum (CBC)
- Allison Clark, Andy Koyama, Hans Oomes, Barbara Free, Roger Van Wensveen – The Lucky Ones: Allied Airmen and Buchenwald (NFB)
- Daniel Pellerin, Sean Kelly, Keith Elliott – Dream Tower (Sphinx Productions)
- Claude Beaugrand, Rene Lussier, Philippe Scultety – Denial (Alter-Cine Productions)

Best Original Music Score for a Program or Mini-Series

- **Neil Smolar** – Dieppe (CBC)
- Mark Korven – The Lucky Ones: Allied Airmen and Buchenwald (NFB)
- Jonathan Goldsmith – Heads (Credo Group/Sojourn Pictures/Atlantis Films)
- Lou Natale – Sodbusters (Atlantis Films/Bond Street Productions)
- Jon Stroll, Kevin Gillis, Sally Gillis – RoboCop – The Future of Law Enforcement (Sky Vision)

Best Original Music Score for a Series

- **John Welsman** – Road to Avonlea – Thursday's Child (Sullivan Entertainment)
- Glenn Morley – Inside the Vatican with Sir Peter Ustinov – Renaissance: 1500 A.D.-1600 A.D. (John McGreevy Productions/Baton Broadcast System)
- Don Gillis – Road to Avonlea – Memento Mori (Sullivan Entertainment)
- Micky Erbe, Maribeth Solomon – E.N.G. – The Cutting Edge (Atlantis Communications)
- Jay Semko, John McCarthy, Jack Lenz – Due South – Free Willie (Alliance Communications)

== Special awards ==
- Canada Award: Nancy Trites Botkin, Joe MacDonald, Honoured for For Angela
- Margaret Collier Award: Timothy Findley
- John Drainie Award: Knowlton Nash
- Earle Grey Award: Harold Ramis, Rick Moranis, John Candy, Dave Thomas, Catherine O'Hara, Joe Flaherty, Martin Short, Andrea Martin, Eugene Levy, Honoured for Second City Television
