= Credo Entertainment Group =

Small Canadian film-production company

Credo
- Type: Film distribution, production company
- Industry: production company; film distribution
- Founded: 1975
- Headquarters: Winnipeg, Manitoba, Canada,

Credo Entertainment (or just Credo) was a Winnipeg-based production and distribution company founded in 1975 by Derek Mazur and Brad Caslor. The company is best known for producing shows and movies such as The Adventures of Shirley Holmes and Pioneer Quest: A Year in the Real West and Heads.

== History ==
Credo was founded by animators and producers Brad Caslor and Derek Mazur to produce and animate commercials for clients such as General Motors and McDonald's. Before launching Credo, Caslor worked for Perkins and Associates to animate segments for Sesame Street; however, Caslor thought the work was too "rigorous and unfulfilling", so he left two years after joining Perkins to start Credo with Mazur. Mazur had also produced the 1981 animation Pigbird.

Caslor left Credo after Get a Job and Joan Scott bought Caslor's shares. The company shifted from small advertisements to film production after a success with the 1986 telefilm Lost in the Barrens starring Adam Beach and the short film "Steam Schemes and national dreams". They produced episodes 14 through 26 of The Adventures of Shirley Holmes between 1994 and 1998.

In the early 2000s, Credo was in dire financial straits after the release of Heads. The final blow took place in 2001 after a deal was made with CBS to produce a $7.2-million film titled Fall from the Sky. Due to the 9/11 terrorist attacks, the film was scrapped. Credo attempted to restructure in early 2000; however, employees tied with the company had left due to other projects and a lack of leadership and ceased operations in 2002.

A lot of our development was handled by producers, which is not normal – when somebody went off to do a show, then development in those areas would stop or be severely curtailed.

— Derek Mazur,

== Production/distribution filmography ==
=== Feature and television films ===
- The Curse of the Viking Grave (1991)
- The Diviners (1993)
- Spirit Rider (1993)
- Paris or Somewhere (1994)
- Trial at Fortitude Bay (1994)
- For Those Who Hunt the Wounded Down (1996)
- My Mother's Ghost (1996)
- Trucks (1997)
- Dream House (1998)
- Nights Below Station Street (1998)
- Escape from Mars (1999)
- Life in a Day (1999)
- Roswell: The Aliens Attack (1999)
- World's Greatest Spas (1999)
- Innocents (Dark Summer) (2000)
- Edge of Madness (2002)
- Pigbird (1981)
- Harvest & Home Fires Burning
- Jacob's Harvest (1993)
- Canada Vignettes (Fort Prince of Wales 1978)

=== Television series ===
- My Life as a Dog (1996–1997)
- The Adventures of Shirley Holmes (1997–2000)
- Pioneer Quest: A Year in the Real West (2000–2001)
