= Queer as Folk season 5 =

Queer as Folk
- Season 5
- DVD cover
- No. of episodes: 13

Release
- Original network: Showtime; Showcase
- Original release: May 22 – August 7, 2005

Season chronology
- ← Previous; Season 4

The fifth and final season of Queer as Folk, an American and Canadian television series, premiered on Showtime on May 22, 2005, and on Showcase on May 23, 2005. Consisting of thirteen episodes, season five served as the final season for Queer as Folk.

The series finale aired on August 7, 2005, in the United States and August 15, 2005, in Canada.

== Cast ==
=== Main cast ===
- Gale Harold as Brian Kinney
- Randy Harrison as Justin Taylor
- Hal Sparks as Michael Novotny
- Peter Paige as Emmett Honeycutt
- Scott Lowell as Ted Schmidt
- Thea Gill as Lindsay Peterson
- Michelle Clunie as Melanie Marcus
- Robert Gant as Ben Bruckner
- Sharon Gless as Debbie Novotny

=== Supporting cast ===
- Harris Allan as James "Hunter" Montgomery
- Sherry Miller as Jennifer Taylor
- Matt Battaglia as Drew Boyd
- Makyla Smith as Daphne Chanders
- Peter MacNeill as Carl Horvath
- Meredith Henderson as Callie Leeson
- Mike Shara as Brett Keller
- Dean Armstrong as Blake Wyzecki
- Stephanie Moore as Cynthia
- Rosie O'Donnell as Loretta Pye

== Episodes ==
No. overall	No. in season	Directed by	Written by	Original release date	Prod. code
71	1	Kelly Makin	Ron Cowen & Daniel Lipman	May 22, 2005 (United States) (Note: In the United States, the season premiere consisted of episodes #1 and #2.); May 23, 2005 (Canada)	501
Michael throws a surprise 10th anniversary party for Melanie and Lindsay but the evening doesn't quite turn out as planned. Justin's stay in Hollywood is extended, in turn affecting his relationship with Brian. At Ted's suggestion, Brian invests his Kinnetik profits in a new venture.
72	2	Michael DeCarlo	Ron Cowen, Daniel Lipman & Del Shores	May 22, 2005 (United States)^{1} May 30, 2005 (Canada)	502
Brian re-opens Babylon but the party boys have disappeared. Justin returns to Pittsburgh after the studio pulls the plug on "Rage." Michael decides to pursue custody of his daughter, Jenny Rebecca. Behind closed doors, Ted pursues a new look after a recent fling turns out to be a chubby chaser. Emmett lands a role in front of the camera as Pittsburgh's resident "Queer Guy" on the local news.
73	3	Michael DeCarlo	Ron Cowen, Daniel Lipman & Brad Fraser	May 29, 2005 (United States); June 6, 2005 (Canada)	503
Brian and Michael grow further apart as Brian struggles to save Liberty Avenue from gentrification and Michael embraces domestic life. The street may never be the same when Debbie decides to retire from the diner and newcomer Loretta Pye takes over.
74	4	Kelly Makin	Ron Cowen, Daniel Lipman & Michael MacLennan	June 5, 2005 (United States); June 13, 2005 (Canada)	504
Brian remains steadfast in his belief that marriage is the death of a relationship. Debbie has a difficult time accepting her role as a lady of leisure-especially when she discovers that Loretta has stolen her act including the button-clad vest right down to the wisecracks. Ted decides to undergo an extreme makeover.
75	5	Chris Grismer	Ron Cowen, Daniel Lipman & Shawn Postoff	June 12, 2005 (United States); June 20, 2005 (Canada)	505
Debbie tries to let Loretta down easy. Brian must refrain from sex after he contracts syphilis. Hunter has to deal with the aftermath of his classmates and their parents discovering how he got HIV. Ted regrets having plastic surgery. Justin and Daphne discuss the possibility (or impossibility) of Brian embracing domestic life. Michael, Melanie, and Lindsey are forced to reevaluate their parenting arrangement when the fight over JR reaches its climax.
76	6	Alex Chapple	Ron Cowen, Daniel Lipman & Del Shores	June 19, 2005 (United States); June 27, 2005 (Canada)	506
Brian's reign as hottest man at Babylon is challenged by the new stud, Brandon. Although a huge success as the "Queer Guy," Emmett faces a challenge of his own when he realizes he's been hired as a clown for the network's ratings. Ted, a new man after his cosmetic surgery, has an opportunity for revenge on an old flame. Ben and Michael attempt to help Hunter lift his spirits and get back to school. Bored as a lady of leisure, Debbie finds herself back at the diner.
77	7	Thom Best	Ron Cowen, Daniel Lipman & Shawn Postoff	June 26, 2005 (United States); July 4, 2005 (Canada)	507
Proposition 14 threatens same sex couple's rights while Brian deals with the threat of Brandon's presence in his world. Justin's decision to move out of Brian's loft creates a rift between Brian and Michael. Ted struggles to remember he's with Troy only in order to exact revenge. Lindsay decides to give her parents a chance and moves back home with her son, Gus.
78	8	Kevin Inch	Ron Cowen, Daniel Lipman & Michael MacLennan	July 3, 2005 (United States); July 11, 2005 (Canada)	508
Justin lands himself in jail for standing up against Proposition 14 and his own father. Brian and Brandon work their way down the list of the ten hottest guys in their competition to determine the real stud of Babylon. Ben grieves Hunter's departure. Melanie and Lindsay attempt an in-house separation while Emmett's stalker reveals himself.
79	9	David Wellington	Ron Cowen, Daniel Lipman & Brad Fraser	July 10, 2005 (United States); July 18, 2005 (Canada)	509
The gang fights against Proposition 14. Michael and Brian still aren't speaking to each other while Lindsay and Melanie's in-house separation heats up. Drew finally comes out. Ted begins his quest for his Mr. Right.
80	10	Kelly Makin	Ron Cowen, Daniel Lipman & Del Shores	July 17, 2005 (United States); July 25, 2005 (Canada)	510
A StopProp14 benefit at babylon with Cyndi Lauper headlining turns into a life changing disaster.
81	11	David Wellington	Ron Cowen, Daniel Lipman & Brad Fraser	July 24, 2005 (United States); August 1, 2005 (Canada)	511
Brian reevaluates his priorities after the bombing of Babylon. Michael continues to recover in the hospital, and a Liberty Avenue vigil for the victims ends in chaos.
82	12	John Fawcett	Ron Cowen, Daniel Lipman & Michael MacLennan	July 31, 2005 (United States); August 8, 2005 (Canada)	512
Brian and Justin are now engaged, but everyone has an opinion. Tired of their parents homphobia, Melanie and Lindsey consider leaving Pittsburgh for Canada. Ted may have finally found his Mr. Right. Emmett catches Drew with another man.
83	13	Kelly Makin	Ron Cowen & Daniel Lipman	August 7, 2005 (United States); August 15, 2005 (Canada)	513
Brian and Justin prepare to marry, but soon doubt begins to rear its head. Lindsay and Melanie prepare to leave Pittsburgh for good. Michael's asked to represent the Committee for Human Rights. Ted sees his relationship with Tad for what it really is.
