= The Apprentice (1991 film) =

- French: L'Apprenti
- Directed by: Richard Condie
- Produced by: Ches Yetman
- Distributed by: National Film Board of Canada
- Release date: 1991
- Country: Canada

The Apprentice (French: L'Apprenti) is a 1991 animated short by Richard Condie, produced in Winnipeg by Ches Yetman for the National Film Board of Canada.

A more enigmatic work than Condie's popular short The Big Snit, the film is a series of animated blackout sketches, telling the story of a medieval jester and his young apprentice. The "dialogue" is supplied by gargling noises, sampled on a computer.

The film received a Blizzard Award for Best Animation at the 1993 Manitoba Motion Picture Industry Association Film & Video Awards.
