= Trucks (film) =

1997 television film by Chris Thomson

- UK Home video cover
- Genre: Horror
- Based on: "Trucks" by Stephen King
- Written by: Brian Taggert
- Directed by: Chris Thomson
- Starring: Timothy Busfield; Brenda Bakke; Aidan Devine; Roman Podhora; Rick Skene; Brendan Fletcher
- Music by: Michael Richard Plowman
- Countries of origin: Canada; United States
- Original language: English

Production
- Executive producers: Mark Amin; Derek Mazur; Jerry Leider; Richard S. Reisberg
- Cinematography: Rob Draper
- Editor: Lara Mazur
- Running time: 95 minutes
- Production companies: Trimark Pictures; Leider-Reisberg; Credo Entertainment Group

Original release
- Network: USA Network
- Release: October 29, 1997

Trucks is a 1997 horror television film directed by Chris Thomson, which follows the story of a group of tourists and locals attacked by autonomous trucks and other inexplicable phenomena in a rural town. It is based on Stephen King's short story "Trucks", which also served as the source material for Maximum Overdrive, the only film directed by King. Trucks aired on the USA Network on October 29, 1997.

== Plot ==
Lunar is a small Nevada town kept alive by its military base (near Area 51) and urban folklore featuring aliens. One morning, local Phil is killed after a truck with no driver veers into his home. A transfer truck carrying frozen meats later starts swerving erratically. The driver notices this, exits the trailer, and inspects it. The truck then locks the driver inside its trailer and drives off. Meanwhile, local resident Hope Gladstone, who has a hiking and tourism business, picks up a group of tourists: Jack, Thad, and Abby. Hope and the tourists eventually come across Phil's truck, which is blocking the road. Then, the driverless frozen meat truck nearly hits them. Distraught, Hope calls local Ray, having found Phil's corpse lying nearby, lacerated. Ray takes the group in his own car back to Lunar. The car, however, is hit and nearly destroyed by a yellow truck. The group eventually reaches a diner. Trucks with no driver are circling the lot between the diner, Hope's cabins, and Ray's gas station. News reports are also coming in, all timed between bouts of static. A report reveals that a large black cloud is a leak from a chemical factory accident near the military base.

Two HAZMAT workers are called in to investigate the cloud. However, one HAZMAT suit in their truck inflates with air, picks up an ax, and murders both workers. The truck then joins the others in Lunar. In a toy store, an RC Tonka dump truck breaks a window and eventually kills a postal worker.

As the group is split up between the cabins and the diner, Ray's teenage son Logan and Abby are trapped with tourists Brad and June. Brad attempts to repair a seemingly dead truck near the cabins, but it animates and kills him. June is then rescued by Ray, who brings her back to the diner. Abby and Logan attempt to reach the diner but become trapped in a drain pipe beneath the lot as a truck attempts to dump silt over them and asphyxiate them.

Meanwhile, two rednecks beat Thad unconscious. One redneck is eventually knocked out by Jack while the second one runs outside.

Ray gets Logan and Abby out of the drainpipe but cannot rescue the redneck, who is chased by the trucks and is forced to flee into the nearest building, where he proceeds to get drunk on beer left there. He uses the beers to create Molotov cocktails but accidentally kills himself in the process, blowing up a building. The trucks then leave Ray alone, sparing him. This prompts the humans to create a plan: Thad will use a motorcycle stored in the garage to sneak up to the base and seek help, while the group will sneak out at night and venture through the forest as Ray distracts the trucks. June wanders up a hillside, where a truck kills her.

At night, Logan rescues the motorcycle and brings it indoors before a truck destroys the garage. An outdoor payphone rings, and Abby runs outside to answer it, causing Jack to shove her aside as a truck nearly hits her. However, Jack himself is crushed to death in the process. The trucks knock out the diner's water supply and electric generator; they spared Ray believing that, as the gas station owner, he is the only human who can refuel them. As Ray and Hope refuel the trucks, Thad and Abby sneak away on the motorcycle. Ray, Hope, and Logan meet up in the forest. Police officer George does not make it but shoots at the trucks, causing one to tip over and become stuck. The leader truck unhooks from the trailer, kills George, and gets stuck in the diner after crashing into it. Ray finds a hunting rifle in a truck's body and shoots at the truck in the diner, causing the entire structure to explode.

That morning, the burned-up truck returns to chase the three survivors, who climb aboard a helicopter and are saved. There, they find a traumatized Abby. Ray later realizes that no one is piloting the helicopter, which starts tilting upwards further into the sky.

== Cast ==
- Timothy Busfield as Ray Porter
- Brenda Bakke as Hope Glaxton
- Brendan Fletcher as Logan Porter
- Roman Podhora as Thad Timmy
- Jay Brazeau as Jack
- Amy Stewart as Abby Timmy
- Victor Cowie as George "Georgie"
- Aidan Devine as Trucker Bob
- Sharon Bajer as June Yeager
- Jonathan Barrett as Brad Yeager
- Rick Skene as Trucker Pete
- Don Granberry as Sheriff
- Kirk Harper as Lino
- Harry Nelken as Phil

== Vehicles used in the film ==
- Western Star 4964
- Grumman-Olson Kurbmaster
- Ford F-Series
- Ford L-Series
- Chevrolet Task-Force Apache
- GMC New Design
- Ford Aerostar
- GMC C6500

== Production ==
Principal photography concluded on August 22, 1997. Filming took place in Gunton and Winnipeg, Manitoba, and Oakbank, Manitoba.

== Reception ==
Trucks received very little critical attention outside of independent internet blogs. TV Guide rated Trucks 2/4 stars and wrote, "The film is all premise and no plot, a problem made worse by the clumsy addition of extraneous gory sequences." Rob Dean of Daily Grindhouse commended the film's various actors, but gave an unfavorable review overall, stating, "Trucks doesn't realize that it is a movie couched in real fears but would be better explored through a lot of vehicular action and exaggerated gruesomeness and insanity. It's far too subdued, and not nearly loony enough. The constant attempt to ground the story in a "logical" explanation - mostly delivered by a TV set that shouldn't work but does, and only gets the exposition channel - undercuts the fact that this could just be a goofy thing with some menace that people would overanalyze on the Internet 20 years later." Dean compared the film unfavourably to the cult horror film Rubber.

== See also ==
- Christine
- Rubber
