= For the Love of Aaron =

- Directed by: John Kent Harrison
- Written by: Peter Silverman
- Produced by: Bob Gray
- Starring: Meredith Baxter; Nick Mancuso
- Cinematography: Glen MacPherson
- Music by: Lawrence Shragge
- Production companies: Marian Rees Associates; Patterdale Productions; The Storytellers Group
- Distributed by: MTM Enterprises
- Release date: 1994
- Running time: 90 minutes
- Country: Canada
- Language: English

For the Love of Aaron is a Canadian television film, directed by John Kent Harrison and released in 1994. Based on the true story of Margaret Gibson, a noted Canadian writer who suffered from bipolar disorder, the film dramatizes her custody battle for her son Aaron after her divorce. The film stars Meredith Baxter as Gibson, Nick Mancuso as her ex-husband Stuart and Keegan Macintosh as Aaron, as well as John Kapelos, Joanna Gleason, Malcolm Stewart and Michael Rogers.

The film aired on Global in Canada, and CBS in the United States, in 1994.

The film was a Gemini Award nominee for Best TV Movie, and Harrison was nominated for Best Direction in a Dramatic Program or Mini-Series, at the 9th Gemini Awards.
