= The Adventures of Shirley Holmes =

Canadian-British mystery television series (1997–2000)

- Genre: Mystery; Children's
- Created by: Ellis Iddon; Phil Meagher
- Written by: Susin Nielsen; Ellis Iddon; Phil Meagher; Therese Beaupre; Elizabeth Stewart; Patricia Finn; Charles Lazer; Rick Drew; Dennis Foon; Tony DiFranco; Barbara O'Kelly; Jordan Wheeler; David Young
- Directed by: Gary Harvey; Norma Bailey; Rick Stevenson; Graeme Lynch; Kim Todd; John L'Ecuyer; Richard O'Brien-Moran; Elise Swerhone; Mark Soulard; Neill Fearnley; T.W. Peacocke; John Paizs; Anne Wheeler; Scott Smith
- Starring: Meredith Henderson; John White; Sarah Ezer; Blair Slater; Brendan Fletcher; Annick Obonsawin; Marie Stillin; Colin Fox; Elizabeth Shepherd; Chris Humphreys; Rebecca Gibson; Maggie Huculak
- Composer: Terry Frewer
- Countries of origin: Canada; United Kingdom
- Original language: English
- No. of series: 4
- No. of episodes: 52

Production
- Executive producers: Derek Mazur; Kim Todd
- Producers: Kim Todd; Gary Harvey; Helena Cynamon; Teri Woods-McArter
- Cinematography: Larry Lynn; Stephen Reizes; Michael Marshall; Les Erskine
- Editors: Paul Mortimer; Robert Lower; Daria Ellerman; Michael Rea
- Camera setup: François Balcaen; Michael Drabot; Steve Madden; Lorne Bailey; Robert L. O'Hara; Brian Sanders; Arlea Ashcroft; Jay Kohne; Michael Marshall
- Running time: 24 minutes
- Production companies: Credo Entertainment Group; Forefront Entertainment; Winchester Films; Winklemania Productions

Original release
- Network: YTV
- Release: February 24, 1997 – May 7, 2000

The Adventures of Shirley Holmes is a children's mystery television series that aired on YTV from 1997 to 2000. The show was created by Ellis Iddon and Phil Meagher (of Winklemania Productions, UK) who had produced a successful series of books with HarperCollins, teaming up with Credo, Forefront, Winchester and Winklemania to develop the TV series. Filmed in Winnipeg, Manitoba, Canada.

The show has been broadcast in over 80 countries and has been dubbed in French, Spanish, Italian, Portuguese, German, Norwegian, Russian, Serbian, Polish and Turkish.

Her performance in the show led to actress Meredith Henderson being nominated for a 1998 Gemini Award and winning one in 1999. The show itself was twice nominated for a Gemini Award in the category "Best Children's or Youth Program or Series" in 1998 and eventually won it in 1999. In the spring of 1998 Susin Nielsen won a Gemini Award in the category "Best Writing in a Children's or Youth Program" for her screenplay of the episode "The Case of the Burning Building". In the same year, Elizabeth Stewart won a WGC Award from the Writers Guild of Canada for her writing of the episode "The Case of the Maestro's Ghost".

Original music was composed by Terry Frewer, although the theme tune was written and performed by show creators Ellis Iddon and Phil Meagher.

Credo spokesperson and producer Kim Todd named a growth spurt in the cast as one of the key reasons for cancelling the show. The aging of the actors would have meant a distinct change in tone and content had the show continued.

== Plot overview ==
The series follows the life of Shirley Holmes, the great-grandniece of Sherlock Holmes who, with the help of ex-gang member Bo Sawchuk, tackles a variety of mysteries in and around the fictional city of Redington, Manitoba. On some occasions, she finds herself matching wits with nemesis Molly Hardy.

== Cast and characters ==
Actor	Character	Position	Seasons			
Actor	Character	Position	1	2	3	4
Meredith Henderson	Shirley Holmes	The great-great-niece of Sherlock Holmes	Main	Main	Main	Main
John White	Francis Boris "Bo" Sawchuck	Shirley's sidekick. Watson counterpart	Main	Main	Main	Main
Sarah Ezer	Molly Hardy	Shirley's nemesis. Moriarty counterpart	Main	Main	Main	Main
Annick Obonsawin	Alicia Gianelli	Shirley's friend	Main	Main	Main	Main
Blair Slater	Bartholemew "Bart" James	Shirley and Bo's nerdy friend	Main	Main	Main	Main
Brendan Fletcher	Sterling "Stink" Patterson	Shirley and Bo's easygoing friend. Sebastian Moran counterpart	Main	Main	Main	
Chris Humphreys	Robert Holmes	Shirley's father	Main	Main	Main	Main
Elizabeth Shepherd	Peggy Holmes	Shirley's grandmother	Main	Main	Main	
Marie Stillin	Ms. Cynthia Stratmann	Headmistress of Sussex Academy	Main	Main	Main	Main
Colin Fox	Mr. Arthur Howie	Sussex History Teacher	Main	Main	Main	Main
Maggie Huculak	Dr. Joanna Holmes	Shirley's mother	Recurring	Recurring	Main	Main

=== Main characters ===
- Meredith Henderson as Shirley Holmes: The great-great-niece of Sherlock Holmes, Shirley is the daughter of British diplomat Robert Holmes and virologist Dr. Joanna Holmes. She carries on her famous ancestor's legacy of solving crimes through deductive reasoning while attending the prestigious Sussex Academy. In addition to Sherlock's detective skills such as deductive reasoning and disguise, she also has his mannerisms, but she can still express her emotions. She prefers to keep a low profile so she can continue her sleuthing. She wears a variety of hats throughout the series. Henderson, as Shirley, was the only character to appear in all episodes of the show.
- John White as Francis Boris "Bo" Sawchuk: Shirley's sidekick. An ex-gang member from a Ukrainian family, Bo attends Sussex Academy on a scholarship. He first met Shirley in afterschool detention and was amazed at the girl detective's deductions about him. Shirley came to his aid after he was falsely accused of setting a work shed on campus on fire. After that case was solved, Bo became her sleuthing partner and best friend, akin to the relationship between 'Sherlock Holmes' and 'Dr. Watson'. He was supposed to be colorblind in first episode however that was never mentioned again. Bo is commonly mistaken as Shirley's boyfriend. His first appearance was in "The Case of the Burning Building." At the end of the series, he leaves for Ukraine to further his studies. White, as Bo, appears in all episodes of the series except "The Case of the Forbidden Mountain," where he is only mentioned by name.
- Sarah Ezer as Molly Hardy: Shirley's nemesis, and Moriarty counterpart; her name is a reference to Sherlock Holmes' infamous foe. A newcomer to Sussex Academy, Molly first appeared as Alicia Gianelli's running mate during the school election for student council president. Through an elaborate scheme, Molly is elected student council president. Her true scheming nature is hidden from everyone except Shirley and Bo. Although her machinations are routinely thwarted by Shirley, Molly manages to escape punishment. She is revealed to be a sociopath in "The Case of the Crooked Comic" and is a mastermind of evil genius with an IQ of 160. Molly first appeared in "The Case of the Ruby Ring." It is possible that she is in fact descended from Professor Moriarty.
- Annick Obonsawin as Alicia Gianelli: Alicia first appeared in "The Case of the Ruby Ring". Alicia is a good friend of Shirley and Bo, and she works at the Quazar Cafe, often mixing up orders of her customers. However, she also bows out easily to peer pressure and appears more simple-minded and materialistic than Shirley is.
- Brendan Fletcher as Sterling "Stink" Patterson: Class clown and prankster. His parents run the local novelty store. If Molly is Shirley's 'Moriarty', Stink could be considered her 'Sebastian Moran', though while being a trouble-maker he is far less malicious. Stink first appeared in "The Case of the Ruby Ring" and his last appearance was in "The Case Of The Crooked Comic". His departure from the series was explained as Molly being unable to get Stink back into Sussex Academy.
- Blair Slater as Bartholemew "Bart" James: Bart first appeared in "The Case of the Ruby Ring." He is highly interested in the paranormal and considers it good fortune to be abducted by aliens. He is also very concerned about his studies, as seen when Math is taken out of the curriculum in Sussex during "The Case of the Calculated Crime". He may be a little odd, but Bo and Shirley still treat him as a friend, and he is aware of Shirley's sleuthing activities and sometimes helps out.
- Chris Humphreys as Robert Holmes: Shirley's father, the great-nephew of Sherlock Holmes. Mr. Holmes first appeared in "The Case of the Burning Building." He is mostly worried for his daughter because he knows her tendency to get involved in cases out of curiosity, and at first he had almost given up hope on finding his wife. His last appearance in the series is in "The Case of the Vanishing Virus."
- Elizabeth Shepherd as Peggy "Gran" Holmes: Shirley's grandmother and Mr. Holmes' mother. Peggy does not appear in the series after "The Case of the Forbidden Mountain" and is mentioned to have gone on vacation in the Fiji Islands in "The Case of the Vanishing Virus."
- Marie Stillin as Ms. Cynthia Stratmann: Headmistress of Shirley's school, Sussex Academy, an upright woman who always works hard to succeed. She first appeared in the first episode, "The Case Of The Burning Building," where she caught Shirley arriving late to class, therefore giving her detention where she ended up meeting Bo. She has a close friendship with Mr. Howie and is a Molly Hardy supporter, unaware of Molly's true intentions.
- Colin Fox as Mr. Arthur Howie: Shirley's history teacher at Sussex. He used to attend Sussex and boarded at the dorm, and was also a very popular student, as shown in "The Case of the Dead Debutante". However, he has kinder-phobia, the phobia of children, as revealed in "The Case of the Alien Abductions".
- Maggie Huculak as Dr. Joanna Holmes: Shirley's mother, who had disappeared for several years as a result of being in Rwanda during a civil war. She, Shirley, and Robert are reunited when Mr. Holmes is offered the chance to go to Rwanda on business. It is often said that Shirley shares her curiosity and determination to never give up.

=== Supporting/Recurring Characters ===
- R. Morgan Slade as Parker. Shirley's classmate who often hangs out with Shirley's gang. However he is barely involved in a case.
- Nathan as Watson the Dog. Shirley's dog.
- Helen Roupp as Mrs. Fish. Lazy secretary of Sussex Academy. She is the opposite to Ms. Stratmann.
- Michael Puttonen as Detective Tremain. He is always wrong about his suspicions, and Shirley is the one who solves the cases instead of him.
- Phillip Jarrett as Inspector Marquee. He is often after Bo' footsteps.
- Jay Brazeau as Frank Patterson. Stink's father.
- Arne MacPherson as Adam Quincy
- Rick Howland as Bernie Szabo in "The Case of the Bouncing Baby"
- Awaovieyi Agie Father Pierre Cayobanda.
- Thomas Milburn Jr. as Kasey Zee. Reporter.
- Jonas Chernick as Daniel Devine. An artist that blamed Stink's dog as a cat killer. He also appeared as Mikola in The Case of the Desperate Dancer.
- Dave 'Squatch' Ward as Jarrod. A motorcyclist that helped Ms. Stratmann in The Case Of The Bamboozling Blonde, he also appeared in The Case of the Liberated Beasts.
- Kett Turton as Norman Melter, he replaced Stink. Somewhat eccentric guy.
- Leslie Wolos as Heather, student in Sussex Academy, she starts dating Bo in last episode. She also appeared in other episodes as a different character.
- Jennifer Lin as Bai Sung. She hides a secret about herself and suddenly turns into Bo's love interest that makes Shirley more jealous than intrigued.
- Bill Switzer as Matt. Shirley's love interest. At first they don't get along well, because Matt mistook Shirley and Bo as a couple, then both realized that they have lot in common.

=== Guest stars ===
- Ryan Gosling as Sean. A gang boy that has issues against Bo. He tried to kill Shirley and Bo in a fire in first episode.
- John Neville as Dr. O. Henry. A young alien hidden in a human corpse that developed a close friendship with Bart.
- Diana Leblanc as Rebecca Ratcliff. An actress that has unexplained accidents behind her. Shirley suspects that she knows her mom.
- Rebecca Gibson as Angela. Rebecca's understudy. Actress in The Case Of The Second Sight.
- George R. Robertson as Bart's Grandfather.
- Shelley Duvall as Alice Flitt. Sussex librarian. Wannabe witch.
- Janet-Laine Green as Ruth Monroe. Miss Stratmann friend since childhood that is always one step behind her.
- Jennifer Clement as Constance Quick. Pretender woman that real name is Barbie Biddel "with double D". She is often receiving death threats.
- Brennan Elliott as Jake Bain. Nice rising star that is struggling with fame.
- Lisa Ryder as Jenny Bain. Singer jealous of her brother's fame.
- Crystal Lowe as Pascal. Karate Girls leader, Episode: "The Case of the Open Hand".
- Rebecca Henderson "Beki Lantos" as Mimi, Episode: "The Case of the Open Hand".

== Episode list ==
=== Season 1: 1997 ===
No. overall	No. in season	Title	Directed by	Written by	Original release date
1	1	"The Case of the Burning Building"	Gary Harvey	Susin Nielsen	February 24, 1997
When ex-gang member and "new kid" at Sussex Academy, Bo Sawchuk, is a suspect in a number of suspicious local fires, Shirley Holmes is on the case.
2	2	"The Case of the Ruby Ring"	Anne Wheeler	Dennis Foon	May 14, 1997
When Sussex Academy Presidential candidate Alicia Gianelli is electrocuted at the podium, all fingers point to the obvious suspect—her opponent Sterling 'Stink' Patterson.
3	3	"The Case of the Liberated Beasts"	John Paizs	Susin Nielsen	May 21, 1997
Watson, Shirley's not very faithful and often disobedient basset hound, leads her to Redington's latest crime—a break-in at "Pete's Rare Pets".
4	4	"The Case of the Precious Cargo"	TW Peacocke	Thérèse Beaupré	May 28, 1997
Shirley notices that Rita, the cafeteria assistant, is stealing food. By following her, Shirley discovers why: Rita is hiding her young niece in the school's laundry room.
5	5	"The Case of the Alien Abductions"	Rick Stevenson	Elizabeth Stewart	June 4, 1997
In one month, three citizens of Redington have been attacked and knocked unconscious with no explanation other than—one victim claims it was an alien abduction!
6	6	"The Case of the Blazing Star"	Neill Fearnley	Rick Drew	June 11, 1997
Bo has quit the football team, flunking half of his classes and falling asleep at school - and he won't tell Shirley what is going on.
7	7	"The Case of the Maestro's Ghost"	Gary Harvey	Elizabeth Stewart	June 18, 1997
It is the fiftieth anniversary of the disappearance of Sussex student Maggie Hancock and Maestro Vespemi, the school's music teacher. Every year on the anniversary the Maestro's ghost comes looking for Maggie.
8	8	"The Case of the Mystery Child"	Gary Harvey	Susin Neilsen	June 25, 1997
After receiving an ancient Egyptian toy from an old colleague on his deathbed, Peggy Holmes starts acting very strangely. Does the toy carry an ancient curse?
9	9	"The Case of the King of Hearts"	Norma Bailey	Patricia Finn	July 2, 1997
The students at Sussex Academy cannot figure out what is wrong with the usually stern and strict Ms. Stratmann—she is smiling and laughing all the time and she is even complimenting Stink on his practical jokes.
10	10	"The Case of the Exact Change"	Norma Bailey	Charles Lazer	July 9, 1997
When Stink, the class clown, goes missing from his thirteenth birthday party everyone, including his dad, thinks his disappearance is an elaborate practical joke. Everyone, that is, except Shirley.
11	11	"The Case of the Cunning Coyote"	Gary Harvey	Thérèse Beaupré	July 16, 1997
Ancient native ceremonies and a mysterious tribal trickster follow Shirley Holmes as she tries to find out what happened to a box of two-hundred-year-old bones that has gone missing from a reservation.
12	12	"The Case of the Singer's Secret"	Gary Harvey	Thérèse Beaupré	July 23, 1997
Bo is stunned and Shirley is devastated when they find Robert Holmes, Shirley's dad, kissing the pop music superstar Leah Farrell.
13	13	"The Case of the Second Sight"	Kim Todd	Elizabeth Stewart	July 30, 1997
While performing in a local theatre production of "A Midsummer Night's Dream", Shirley discovers that the lead actress, Rebecca Radcliff, is a jinx—or so the entire cast and crew believe.

=== Season 2: 1998 ===
No. overall	No. in season	Title	Directed by	Written by	Original release date
14	1	"The Case of the Wannabe Witch"	Graeme Lynch	Elizabeth Stewart	January 5, 1998
Could Ms. Flitt, the Sussex school librarian, be a witch? It is a possibility that Shirley must entertain as she investigates a series of ominous mishaps at Sussex Academy.
15	2	"The Case of the Doggone Cats"	Norma Bailey	Charles Lazer	January 12, 1998
Barf, Stink's dog, is under suspicion when neighborhood cats start disappearing. When he is nabbed by Hoskins, the over zealous local dogcatcher, his life hangs in the balance.
16	3	"The Case of the Babyfingers"	Gary Harvey	Thérèse Beaupré	January 19, 1998
Shirley infiltrates an organized gang of kiddie thieves after her backpack is "snatched" by a six-year-old pickpocket.
17	4	"The Case of the Bouncing Baby"	Rick Stevenson	Susin Nielsen	January 26, 1998
Shirley and Bo join the circus as they try to find out who left a baby boy on Mr. Howie's doorstep in the middle of the night.
18	5	"The Case of the Rising Moon"	Rick Stevenson	Elizabeth Stewart	February 2, 1998
Shirley's attempts to uncover the truth about a mysterious new boarding student at Sussex Academy place the young stranger's life in danger.
19	6	"The Case of the Exploding Puppet"	Richard O'Brien-Moran	Jordan Wheeler	February 9, 1998
There is trouble on the set of The Happy Valley Show: props are exploding, background walls are falling over and Freddie the Firefly recently blew his light-bulb.
20	7	"The Case of the Cryptic Creature"	John L'Ecuyer	Barbara O'Kelly	February 16, 1998
Sitting on the toilet becomes unsafe at Sussex Academy when the kids discover there is a slithering creature living in the water system.
21	8	"The Case of the Missing Marbles"	Kim Todd	Patricia Finn	February 23, 1998
When Bo befriends "the crazy old lady" who lives down the block, he and Shirley find themselves being pursued by a criminal impostor as they race to find a bag of stolen diamonds.
22	9	"The Case of the Mischievous Poltergeist"	Graeme Lynch	Susin Nielsen	March 2, 1998
Bart is turning twelve—and everyone hopes his party won't be as boring as last year's. They needn't worry. Bart has a special guest lined up—his very own poltergeist!
23	10	"The Case of the Left Thumbprint"	Gary Harvey	Thérèse Beaupré	March 9, 1998
When Robert Holmes is accused of stealing a top secret government decoding key from the British Consulate, Shirley jumps to her father's defense and vows to find the real offender.
24	11	"The Case of the Golden Cave"	John L'Ecuyer	David Young	March 16, 1998
An orienteering excursion into the deep woods brings to life a ghost story for the students of Sussex Academy.
25	12	"The Case of the Patron Saint"	Richard O'Brien-Moran	Elizabeth Stewart	March 23, 1998
When a disoriented stranger appears at the Holmes' front door with Joanna Holmes' stethoscope in his hand, Shirley is certain that the man has information on her missing mother's whereabouts.
26	13	"The Case of the Broken Oath"	Norma Bailey	Thérèse Beaupré	March 30, 1998
Shirley suspects that Bo's cousin Zack, a musician, has something to do with the strange accidents that are taking other performers out of the picture and helping his career skyrocket!

=== Season 3 ===
No. overall	No. in season	Title	Directed by	Written by	Original release date
27	1	"The Case of the Celestial Signal"	Gary Harvey	Tony DiFranco	September 14, 1998
At the observatory, Bart hears signals from outerspace and runs into Shirley on the case. When two officials show up, it becomes clear that the man in charge of the observatory is not who he says he is.
28	2	"The Case of the Galloping Ghost"	Kim Todd	Elizabeth Stewart	September 21, 1998
At a horse ranch, the ghost of a horse seems to be stealing other horses. Shirley meets a boy working at the ranch that may be able to help solve the case.
29	3	"The Case of the Crooked Comic"	Richard O'Brien-Moran	Elizabeth Stewart	September 28, 1998
Molly and Stink are accused of stealing exam questions. Stink gets kicked out of the academy and sets out to become a stand-up comic.
30	4	"The Case of the Flim Flam Farm"	Richard O'Brien-Moran	Thérèse Beaupré	October 5, 1998
Mr. Howie stays at the Howie Farm, but when he stays their longer than he had expected, Shirley has questions. Not only do the animals on the farm act nuts, but there is a ghost legend, and a feud between the Howies and the Wilkinsons.
31	5	"The Case of the Mysterious Message"	Gary Harvey	Patricia Finn	October 12, 1998
Shirley receives a message that her grandmother has been kidnapped. As Shirley looks for her grandmother, her own friends think that she was abducted.
32	6	"The Case of the Second Take"	Scott Smith	Jordan Wheeler	October 19, 1998
Alicia shoots a movie, but when strange occurrences and disappearances happen, Shirley follows the wrong suspect and puts herself in danger.
33	7	"The Case of the Code of Silence"	Scott Smith	Elizabeth Stewart	October 26, 1998
To protect a friend, Bo sabotages the presses of the Redington Tribune.
34	8	"The Case of the Bamboozling Blonde"	Elise Swerhone	Susin Nielsen	November 2, 1998
After accepting a Woman of the Year award, Mrs. Stratmann is arrested for fraud. She is believed to be the wanted Honey Boulet, but Shirley believes that she's being framed.
35	9	"The Case of the Real Fake"	Elise Swerhone	Thérèse Beaupré	November 9, 1998
Shirley witnesses a death threat against author Constance Quick and believes that the intended target may be a lip-syncing singer Jake Bane.
36	10	"The Case of the Open Hand"	Rick Stevenson	Thérèse Beaupré	November 16, 1998
After Bo is attacked and his clothing is stolen by a gang of girls, Shirley joins them in order to find out more information about a former member they may have kidnapped.
37	11	"The Case of the Ten Dollar Thief"	Rick Stevenson	Susin Nielsen	November 23, 1998
Local stores are being robbed of $10 bills, and the thief is returning them afterwards. Shirley and Bo figure that the thief is looking for a special bill.
38	12	"The Case of the Miraculous Mine"	Norma Bailey	Thérèse Beaupré	November 30, 1998
When a fever strikes a ruby mine in Rwanda, its cure provides clues to the whereabouts of Shirley's missing and presumed dead mother.
39	13	"The Case of the Forbidden Mountain"	Norma Bailey	Elizabeth Stewart	December 7, 1998
Shirley and her dad head to Rwanda in order to gather more information on Shirley's mother.

=== Season 4 ===
No. overall	No. in season	Title	Directed by	Written by	Original release date
40	1	"The Case of the Calculated Crime"	Kim Todd	Elizabeth Stewart	February 13, 2000
Math classes at school are suspended due to budget cuts. Instead, the school receives new electronic equipment. Bo attends another school that has banned electronics and kept math in order to find out what's going on.
41	2	"The Case of the Dead Debutante"	Kim Todd	Susin Nielsen	February 20, 2000
A ghost takes over Alicia's body and tries to make her kill Mr. Howie.
42	3	"The Case of the Vanishing Virus"	Norma Bailey	Jennifer Black	February 27, 2000
A very rare and dangerous sample of a deadly virus is stolen from the laboratory.
43	4	"The Case of the Virtual Zeus"	Kim Todd	Elizabeth Stewart	March 5, 2000
Shirley and Bo, along with 'Cowboy Matt' try to find the head of Kaeon. Meanwhile, the students start a protest to get math classes back.
44	5	"The Case of the Basket Case"	Richard O'Brien-Moran	Greg Kennedy	March 12, 2000
Strange incidents are keeping the Sussex Hornets from winning the basketball championships. After one of the 'accidents' causes Bo to hurt his ankle, Shirley decides to find out who is behind the sabotage.
45	6	"The Case of the Skeleton in the Closet"	Mark Soulard	Patricia Finn	March 17, 2000
Shirley discovers a skeleton out while walking Watson. However, she suspects something is suspicious when the coroner won't admit to the fact that the body had a ring on one of its fingers.
46	7	"The Case of the Perfect Boyfriend"	Kim Todd	Conni Massing	March 26, 2000
A French boy, Maurice, is trying to get Alicia's attention. Shirley believes that he is too perfect. Meanwhile, Alicia is also being scouted by an ad agent. The agent and Maurice seem to be connected.
47	8	"The Case of the Falling Star"	Norma Bailey	Conni Massing	April 2, 2000
Shirley and Bo must protect a teen TV star from an assassin.
48	9	"The Case of the Puzzle from the Past"	Kim Todd	Elizabeth Stewart	April 9, 2000
When Shirley receives an orchid from a secret admirer, a bee sting sends her into an anaphylactic-shock-induced dream where she tries to figure out who was the sender, with the help of clips from past shows.
49	10	"The Case of the Desperate Dancer"	Norma Bailey	Stephanie Kostiuk	April 16, 2000
When a dancer in a visiting Ukrainian dance troop steals a religious icon, Bo learns an unpleasant Sawchuck family secret.
50	11	"The Case of the Hidden Heart"	Norma Bailey	Ann McNaughton	April 23, 2000
Shirley and Bo discover a new side to Molly when they try to save Molly's horse, Foxglove, from being put down due to a suspected rabies infection.
51	12	"The Case of King Arthur's Alibi"	Mark Soulard	Elizabeth Stewart	April 30, 2000
Shirley tries to find out what's wrong with Mr. Howie after he's arrested for imprisoning Ms. Stratmann during a medieval festival.
52	13	"The Case of the Dragon's Breath"	Richard O'Brien-Moran	Elizabeth Stewart	May 7, 2000
Bo gets sucked into a real-life adventure game.
