= Matthew Walker (Canadian actor) =

British-Canadian actor (born 1942)

- Born: 11 April 1942 (age 83); England, UK
- Citizenship: English-Canadian
- Occupation: Actor
- Years active: 1970–present

Matthew Walker (born 11 April 1942) is an English-Canadian film and television actor best known for his role in Little Women.

== Career ==
He appeared in many Canadian television productions in the 1990s and 2000s. He played Michael, Nick Eliot's boss in The Crush. He played Father Mac in 22 episodes of the television series Hope Island, and Max Asher in 11 episodes of MythQuest. He also played the recurring character Ian MacLeod, the father of Duncan MacLeod in Highlander: The Series, Father Perry in Mysterious Ways and Merlin in the Stargate television franchise. In 2007, he was nominated for a Leo Award for "Best Supporting Performance by a Male in a Dramatic Series" in the Stargate SG-1 episode "The Quest (Part 2)." He also played Mr. March in Little Women.

== Filmography ==
=== Film ===
Year	Title	Role	Notes
1989	We're No Angels	Blacksmith	
1993	The Crush	Michael	
1994	Little Women	Mr. March	
1998	Futuresport	Neville Hodgkins	
2001	Spy Game	MI6 Agent Digby 'Digger' Gibson	
2006	Night at the Museum	Politician	
2007	Christmas in Wonderland	Santa / Mr. Nicholas / Mall Ghost / Kristopher Kringle / Old Man With Walker	

=== Television ===
Year	Title	Role	Notes
1992	Bill and Ted's Excellent Adventures	Uther Pendragon	Episode: "Nail the Conquering Hero"
1996	The Angel of Pennsylvania Avenue	Handy Andy	Television movie
1997	Convictions	Chaplain	Television movie
1999	Master Keaton	Detective Rupert / Oscar Hammer (voices)	English version Credited as Mathew Walker; Episodes: "The Island of Cowards" and "The Forbidden Fruit"
1999–2000	Hope Island	Father Mac	22 episodes
2001	MythQuest	Max Asher	9 episodes
2005–2007	Stargate SG-1	Merlin / Roham	4 episodes
2007	Smallville	Dr. Hudson	Episode: "Labyrinth"
2017	A Series of Unfortunate Events	Ticket Seller	Episode: "The Reptile Room: Part One"
