= Getting Started =

- Directed by: Richard Condie
- Written by: Richard Condie
- Produced by: Jerry Krepakevich
- Starring: Jay Brazeau (voice); Richard Condie
- Music by: Patrick Godfrey
- Production company: National Film Board of Canada (NFB)
- Release date: 1979
- Running time: 12 minutes
- Country: Canada
- Language: English

Getting Started is a 1979 animated short by Richard Condie and produced in Winnipeg by the National Film Board of Canada.

== Summary ==
The film is a comical look at procrastination, based partly on the filmmaker's own experiences, portraying the inability of a pianist to rehearse a Debussy composition.

== Accolades ==
Awards for Getting Started included the Genie Award for best animation film. The film also won awards at the Zagreb World Festival of Animated Films and the Tampere Film Festival, as well as the Bijou Award for Best Animation.

== Credits ==
- Story, Animation, Direction: Richard Condie
- Backgrounds: Sharon Condie
- Music: Patrick Godfrey - From Debussy's Children's Corner
- Voices: Richard Condie and Jay Brazeau
- Inker: Mary-Lou Storey
- Painter: Gloria Thorsteinson
- Animation Camera: Svend-Erik Eriksen and Tom Brydon
- Sound Editor: Ken Rodeck
- Re-Recording: Clive Perry
- Studio Administrator: Charles Lough
- Producer: Jerry Krepakevich
- Executive Producer: Michael Scott
- Getting Started
- A National Film Board Of Canada - Prairie Production
