= Richard Condie =

Canadian film animator

- Born: Richard Condie; 1942 (age 83–84); Vancouver, British Columbia, Canada
- Occupations: Animator; filmmaker; musician; voice actor
- Years active: 1971–present
- Notable work: The Big Snit; Getting Started; La Salla; Pigbird; The Apprentice

Richard Condie, RCA (born 1942) is a Canadian animator, filmmaker, musician and voice actor. Condie is best known for his 1985 animated short The Big Snit at the National Film Board of Canada and has won six international awards for Getting Started in 1979. Condie lives and works in Winnipeg, Manitoba.

== Education and career ==
Born in Vancouver, British Columbia, Condie moved to Winnipeg at the age of four. There he attended Kelvin High School, graduating in 1961. He received his Bachelor of Arts in sociology from the University of Manitoba in 1967. Prior to entering the animation field, he worked periodic stints as a musician for the Manitoba Theatre Centre and CBC TV from 1964 to 1965. In 1967 Condie moved to Vancouver where he worked as a sociologist at the University of British Columbia. Two years later he returned to Winnipeg and tested out a number of occupations. In 1971 he was awarded the first of two grants from the Canada Council, which he used to produce the animated short film Oh Sure. The film was later purchased by the National Film Board of Canada, with whom Condie was to work extensively.

Condie's best known animated work is 1985's The Big Snit, an offbeat parable about marriage, Scrabble, sawing, and nuclear war. The Big Snit was nominated for an Oscar and won the Genie Award for Best Animated Short, along with over a dozen international awards. The Big Snit was also voted as #25 of the 50 Greatest Cartoons of all time by animation professionals.

Condie co-produced fellow Winnipeg animator Cordell Barker's acclaimed short The Cat Came Back. Condie was also the voice of the main character and sang on the soundtrack. He entered the field of computer animation with his 1996 short La Salla. In 1998 he did some television script writing for Nelvana, then created the television pilot The Ark for the company in 2002. Currently Condie is painting, creating music and working on a series of panel cartoons.

Condie's work, featuring the constantly moving - "boiling" - line animation style, has been characterized as "wacky, weird, [and] bizarre." Others have referred to his "raw visual style and insanely honest and humorous character portrayals." University of Manitoba film historian Gene Walz stated that Condie "is an auteur-animator, one with excellent antennae for sensing society's ridiculous foibles and painful vulnerabilities."

Condie is a founding member of the Winnipeg Film Group, and a member of the Academy of Motion Picture Arts and Sciences, the Royal Canadian Academy of Arts and the International Animated Film Association.

== Collaborators ==
Throughout his career, Condie collaborated with a very small number of individuals to create his films. He worked closely with musician Patrick Godfrey. Another close collaborator was Condie's sister, Sharon Condie. John Law and the Mississippi Bubble was inspired by Sharon's research; she also wrote the script, did some of the animation and painted backgrounds for the film. She also created the backgrounds for two other of Condie's films, Getting Started (1979) and The Big Snit (1985). Other collaborators included actor (and singer) Jay Brazeau and producers Michael Scott and Ches Yetman.

== Awards and legacy ==
Richard Condie won six international awards for Getting Started in 1979. The film received awards at Kraków, Zagreb, Tampere (Finland), and was named best animated film at the Genie Awards. Pig Bird, released in 1981 also won five international awards, including recognition at Zagreb for best educational film. In all, The Big Snit garnered a total of 16 prizes including: The International Film Critics' Prize at the 15th Annecy International Animated Film Festival; Best Short Film Award at the Montreal World Film Festival; the Hiroshima prize, Japan 1985; A Silver Plaque at the 21st Chicago International Film Festival; and the Best Animation Film at the XVI Tampere International Short Film Festival. It was also included in the Animation Show of Shows. Following the enormous success of The Big Snit, Condie released The Apprentice/L'Apprenti in 1991. The film won awards in Chicago in 1992 and Winnipeg in 1993. Condie's last animation, La Salla, won nine awards, including ones from Winnipeg (1996), Vancouver (1996), Chicago (1997) and Jerusalem (1998). La Salla was also nominated for an Oscar. In total Condie has won over 40 international and Canadian awards for his films.

In addition to Condie's many awards, his films have been featured in over 100 exhibitions and major retrospectives all over the world. These have taken place in such widely diverse locations as Berkeley, California (1980), New Delhi, India (1981), London, England (1985), Kraków, Poland (1986), Espinho, Portugal (1991), and Brussels, Belgium (1998).

In 2005 Condie donated drawings, animation cels, backgrounds, layouts, dope sheets, award notifications, exhibition programs, digitized photographs, as well as publication and periodical information related to a number of his films to the University of Manitoba Archives & Special Collections. Approximately 100 painted cels as well as two backgrounds created by Sharon Condie for the film The Big Snit were acquired by the University of Manitoba Libraries and deposited in the Archives in 2006.

== Selected filmography ==
- Sesame Street (1974–1975) (Director, Writer, TV)
- Oh Sure (1977)
- John Law and the Mississippi Bubble (1978)
- Getting Started (1979)
- Pig Bird (1981)
- The Big Snit (1985)
- Heartland (1987) (IMAX)
- Another Government Movie, World Expo 88, Brisbane (1988) (Director)
- The Cat Came Back (1988) (Producer; voice actor as Mr. Johnson)
- The Apprentice (L'Apprenti) (1991)
- Another Government Movie, Seville Expo '92 (1992) (Director)
- La Salla (1996)
- The Ark (2002) (Creator, Director, Animator, TV series)
- Etudes and Impromptus (2003–04)
- Runaway (2009) (voice actor as Captain)
- Bus Story (2014) (voice actor as Little Kids and Teenager)
- Katalog of Flaws (2020) (animator)

== Music ==
- A House on the Prairie (1978)
- Day Dream (1979)
- The Top Few Inches (1978)
- Darts in the Dark: An Introduction to W.O. Mitchell (1980)
- W.O. Mitchell: Novelist in Hiding (1980)
- Henry Kelsey (1980)
- Everyone's Business (1982)
- Ocean of Wisdom from CBC's Man Alive (1989)
