= Escape from Mars =

- Written by: Peter Mohan; Jim Henshaw
- Directed by: Neill Fearnley
- Music by: Peter Allen
- Country of origin: United States
- Original language: English

Production
- Producers: Peter Lhotka; Michael Scott; Arvi Liimatainen
- Cinematography: Peter Woeste
- Editor: Paul Mortimer
- Running time: 87 minutes
- Production companies: Credo Entertainment Group; Paramount Television

Original release
- Network: UPN
- Release: February 25, 1999

Escape from Mars is a 1999 made-for-TV film produced for the UPN Network. The story concerns five astronauts who make the first crewed trip to Mars in 2015.

The film was filmed in Winnipeg, Manitoba, Canada.

== Plot ==
In 2015 the first crewed mission to Mars will be launched. The crew consists of five astronauts, two of whom are women. In addition to technical problems that arise, tensions arise between the crew members during the long flight to Mars. Only during the course of the trip does it emerge that Commander Rank has recently separated from his wife and is avoiding any personal contact with her. He behaves coldly towards the other crew members.

The landing on Mars is successful and the space shuttle touches down just 17 meters from the planned landing site. Shortly after landing on Mars, astronaut Lia learns that her fiancé had a fatal accident on an icy road. However, after some time she is able to overcome the loss by concentrating on her task within the mission. The lander is damaged by meteorite impacts on the planet. The crew flees to a nearby cave to escape the bombardment. Astronaut Singer is injured.

Astronauts John Rank and Sergei Andropov take an exploration trip with the Mars vehicle into the nearby mountains to search for raw materials and signs of life; They get caught in a violent sandstorm that overturns the Mars rover. Both men are injured. Andropov's spacesuit is damaged, leaking vital oxygen. John saves Sergei's life by giving him his oxygen supply. The two astronauts Lia Poirier and Bill Malone start a rescue mission with the replacement vehicle and eventually find their injured crew members. Sergei survives with serious injuries, while John dies from lack of oxygen.

Sergei points to an opposite rock face with a fluorescent appearance, which has its origins in bioorganisms. This successfully proves life on Mars. John Rank is buried on Mars and celebrated as a lifesaver. At the end of the mission, after a year and a half stay on Mars, the crew learned from ground control that there would not be enough fuel and supplies for the five astronauts to fly back. The tragic loss of a crew member turns out to be a stroke of luck for the remaining crew: by recalculating fuel consumption and supplies, ground control gives the green light for a safe return to the home planet Earth.

== Cast ==
- Christine Elise as Lia Poirier, Sagan Cocommander
- Peter Outerbridge as John Rank, Sagan Cocommander
- Allison Hossack as Andrea Singer, Mission Chemist
- Michael Shanks as Bill Malone, Mission Architect
- Ron Lea as Jason, Mission Control Weasel
- Kavan Smith as Sergei Andropov, Mission Biogeochemist
- David Kaye as Steve Yaffe
- Peter Kelamis as David Adams, Mission Control Weasel
- Julie Khaner as Gail "Mack" McConnell, Mission Control
- Tammy Isbell as Stephanie Rank, John's Ex-Wife
- Arlene MacPherson as Remi
- Aaron Pearl as Robert, Lia Poirier's Fiancé
- Jonathan Barrett as Richard Singer, Andrea's Husband
- Darrell Nicholson as Andy Singer
- Sophia Sweatman as Amanda Singer

== Home Release ==
Released on VHS.

== Reception ==
Radio Times gave the movie two out of five stars. Moria gave the movie the same rating, finding the scientific realism of the movie a plus, but that the direction and characters were lacking. TV Guide gave the movie one of four stars, finding the movie spends too much time in the Earth bound control room.

== See also ==
- List of films set on Mars
- List of television films produced for UPN
