= Trucks (short story) =

1978 short story by Stephen King

- Short story by Stephen King
- Country: United States
- Language: English
- Genres: Horror, science fiction

Publication
- Published in: Night Shift
- Publisher: Doubleday
- Media type: Print (Hardcover)
- Publication date: 1978

"Trucks" is a short story by Stephen King, first published in the June 1973 issue of Cavalier magazine, and later collected in King's 1978 collection Night Shift. The basic premise of "Trucks" was the basis for the film Maximum Overdrive.

== Plot ==
An unnamed narrator arrives at an isolated truck stop diner after witnessing trucks deliberately crashing into and destroying passenger vehicles on the interstate. Upon reaching the diner, he finds it occupied by a short order cook, a truck driver who had stopped for a meal, a young couple whose car had been wrecked in the parking lot, and a salesman named Snodgrass. Outside, numerous heavy trucks and other vehicles idle without drivers, their engines operating independently. Two human corpses, the driver of a destroyed Cadillac and a woman in a pink dress, lie in the lot. Communication with the outside world fails: the telephone is inoperable, and the two-way radio emits only static. Snodgrass panics and attempts to flee across the parking lot. Two trucks pursue and strike him, propelling his body into a drainage ditch. The survivors watch helplessly as the trucks continue patrolling the area in deliberate patterns, their movements coordinated and purposeful. Additional vehicles, including pickup trucks, join the encirclement. As night falls and the power fails, the group conserves its resources, barricades the side door, and makes limited forays to secure water from the restroom tanks. Snodgrass dies agonizingly from internal bleeding overnight.

The next morning, the trucks issue demands by sounding their air horns in Morse code. The message, decoded by the young man Jerry, instructs the survivors to pump fuel into the vehicles, promising that those who comply will not be harmed. In an ensuing debate, the truck driver advocates waiting, believing the vehicles will exhaust their fuel supplies, and the narrator suggests compliance until an opportunity for escape emerges, whereas the cook and young couple, unwilling to subjugate themselves, favor resistance. When the group votes to refuse the demand, a bulldozer attacks the diner, systematically demolishing the front wall and interior. The survivors improvise Molotov cocktails using fuel from butane drums. Jerry is killed while throwing the cocktails, but one strikes the bulldozer's engine compartment, causing it to veer away and explode. The truck driver attempts to flee during the chaos and is run down by a smaller vehicle. With the diner now largely destroyed and resistance proven futile, the narrator agrees to refuel the waiting trucks. He labors for hours at the fuel islands, servicing an apparently endless queue that extends far along the road until the cook eventually relieves him.

The young woman, devastated by Jerry's death, rests fitfully. The narrator, confronting the grim reality of their situation, reflects that similar events are likely occurring nationwide and considers the long-term implications: the machines cannot reproduce but can be manufactured indefinitely by automated or coerced human labor. Humanity faces a reduction to servitude, maintaining the vehicles while the machines reshape the environment, paving over natural landscapes and eliminating obstacles to their dominance. The narrator prepares to awaken the young woman for her shift at the pumps, recognizing that survival now requires obedience to their mechanical masters. As a pair of planes fly overhead, the narrator, in resigned despair, fears that they are without pilots.

== Adaptations ==
The story has been adapted into two films. In 1986, it was adapted for cinema with the King-directed Maximum Overdrive, which King himself described as "a critical and financial flop".

In 1997, it was adapted again as the TV movie Trucks, starring Timothy Busfield, Brenda Bakke, and Brendan Fletcher, which Video Business called "Mindless, but well-executed and rarely boring" with "the fiery action King's fans no doubt want to see."

== See also ==
- Stephen King short fiction bibliography
