= MythQuest =

- Starring: Christopher Jacot; Meredith Henderson; Wendy Anderson; Matthew Walker; Joseph Kell
- Composer: Micki Meuser
- Country of origin: Canada
- Original language: English
- No. of seasons: 1
- No. of episodes: 13

Production
- Executive producers: David Braun; Kevin DeWalt; Wolfram Tichy
- Running time: 45 minutes
- Production companies: VIF International Films; David Braun Productions; Minds Eye Pictures

Original release
- Network: CBC (Canada); PBS (United States)
- Release: August 25 – November 17, 2001

MythQuest is a Canadian children's television series that originally aired on CBC in Canada and PBS in the United States in 2001. Produced by Minds Eye Pictures, the series was shot in Drumheller, Calgary, East Coulee, Alberta, and Regina, Saskatchewan.

The series is not currently available on DVD or video. However, there have been novels adapted from the first three episodes as well as "Minokichi," written by Dan Danko, Tom Mason, and John Whitman.

== Premise ==
When their father vanishes without a trace, teenagers Cleo (Meredith Henderson) and Alex Bellows (Christopher Jacot) discover that when they touch artifacts on the screens of the Cyber Museum, a computer program created by their father, they are able to travel into myths.

They become characters in the myths, and strive to keep the myth to its normal progression; a difficult task when confronted by Gorgos, a trickster god who appears in each myth to try to change it. Alex's initial journey into the Cyber Museum is an accident, but soon they both begin searching for their father within the myths. As the series progresses, they realize that their search is much more important than they first realized, as Gorgos is bent on wiping out entire cultures by corrupting their mythologies

== Cast ==
- Christopher Jacot as Alex Bellows
- Meredith Henderson as Cleo Bellows
- Wendy Anderson as Lily Bellows
- Matthew Walker as Max Asher
- Joseph Kell as Matt Bellows

== Episodes ==
No.	Title	Directed by	Written by	Original release date
1	"The Minotaur"	Paul Schneider	Morrie Ruvinsky	August 25, 2001
Matt Bellows "borrows" a statue of Cheng-O to upload into his precious CyberMuseum, but inadvertently releases trickster god Gorgos and is cursed to wander from myth to myth. Shortly thereafter, Alex and Cleo discover the CyberMuseum's ability to transport them into myths when Alex accidentally takes the place of Theseus.
2	"Hammer of the Gods"	Stefan Scaini	Gillian Horvath	September 1, 2001
Alex assumes the role of one of Loki's sons and tries to convince Thor to release his erstwhile friend, unaware of the crimes Loki is accused of.
3	"Red Wolf's Daughter"	Paul Schneider	Jeffrey Cohen	September 8, 2001
Cleo discovers that she can walk when inside a myth, as she takes on the role of a Nez Perce chieftain's daughter caught in a doomed romance.
4	"Orpheus"	Rob W. King	Tom Szollosi	September 15, 2001
Alex visits the underworld on the off-chance his father is dead, but Hades assures him this is not the case. Cleo, meanwhile, must convince him to put aside his mounting feelings for Eurydice to preserve the myth.
5	"Minokichi"	Stefan Scaini	Tom Szollosi	September 22, 2001
Cleo must convince Alex that his idyllic life in ancient Japan is built around a dark and dangerous secret.
6	"Sir Caradoc at the Round Table"	Stefan Scaini	Gillian Horvath	September 29, 2001
Alex and Cleo try to consult Camelot's library about their father and the Gorgos stone, but Merlin, aware of Alex's true identity, convinces him to try and change the fate of Lancelot and Guinevere.
7	"The Doppelgänger"	Stefan Scaini	Jeffrey Cohen	October 6, 2001
After Alex narrowly escapes from his latest foray into the CyberMuseum as the shadow of an Italian painter, he finds something isn't quite right. Gorgos at last reveals his hand in events.
8	"The Oracle"	Rob W. King	Jeffrey Cohen	October 13, 2001
Cleo visits ancient Delphi consult the Oracle about their father, but winds up taking the place of the Oracle herself.
9	"Isis and Osiris (1)"	Nicholas Kendall	Tracey Forbes	October 20, 2001
Following a tip from Apollo, Alex becomes Osiris to finally locate his father. Unfortunately, he's arrived in mythical Egypt just as Set is preparing to betray his brother.
10	"Isis and Osiris (2)"	Nicholas Kendall	Tracey Forbes	October 20, 2001
Cleo assumes the role of Isis and reunites at last with her father. As the pair set out to restore Alex (Osiris), their path is blocked at every turn by Set... and Gorgos.
11	"Blodeuwedd"	Manfred Guthe	Peter Mohan	October 27, 2001
After a grim discovery in the CyberMuseum, Cleo takes on the role of a Welsh princess in order to consult the Druids, but things don't go exactly as planned.
12	"The Blessing"	Manfred Guthe	Barbara Sapergia	November 3, 2001
Struggles with her disability prompt Cleo to take shelter in an African myth to take her mind off things and restore her resolve.
13	"Quetzalcoatl"	Stefan Scaini	Jeanne Heal	November 17, 2001
Alex enters Toltec mythology, and from Quetzalcoatl develops a new appreciation for knowledge and the people who teach it, but remains oblivious to Tezcatlipoca's sinister plans. Meanwhile, Cleo deals with a stranger in the real world who's asking all the wrong questions.
