= Heads (film) =

1993 film directed by Paul Shapiro

- Genre: Comedy; Crime
- Screenplay by: Adam Brooks; Jay Stapleton
- Story by: Jay Stapleton
- Directed by: Paul Shapiro
- Starring: Jon Cryer; Edward Asner; Jennifer Tilly; Roddy McDowall
- Music by: Jonathan Goldsmith
- Countries of origin: Canada; United States
- Original language: English

Production
- Executive producers: Peter Sussman; Martin Tudor; Bill Gray
- Producers: Jonathan Goodwill; Derek Mazur
- Cinematography: Alar Kivilo
- Editor: Patrick Lussier
- Running time: 90 minutes
- Production companies: Credo Entertainment Group; Atlantis Films

Original release
- Network: Showtime
- Release: January 29, 1994

Heads is an American-Canadian black comedy directed by Paul Shapiro that originally aired as a TV film on Showtime on January 29, 1994. It stars Jon Cryer, Edward Asner, Jennifer Tilly, and Roddy McDowall. Filming took place in Manitoba, Canada.

== Plot ==
Guy Franklin, a bumbling proofreader at a small-town newspaper, gets promoted to reporter when the usual staffer fails to show for work. When the man Guy replaced turns up dead and decapitated, editor-in-chief Ab Abbot sees it as an opportunity for sensationalist news coverage such as the town has never seen before. Guy is appointed to investigate the murder. When evidence implicates Betty Jo, a waitress Guy is secretly in love with, he attempts to warn her; however, she is also found similarly murdered, along with Fibrus Drake, an eccentric tycoon who had contacted Guy with a tip about the killer's identity. In the meantime, Guy becomes romantically involved with Tina, Ab's hippie daughter. Guy soon becomes the prime suspect in the murders and is arrested. Realizing Tina may be the next victim, he breaks out of jail to get to her before the killer can.

== Cast ==
- Jon Cryer as Guy Franklin
- Edward Asner as Abner "Ab" Abbot
- Jennifer Tilly as Tina Abbot
- Roddy McDowall as Fibrus Drake
- Charlene Frenetz as Betty Jo
- Shawn Alex Thompson as Sheriff Cox
- Nancy Drake as Emily

== Reception ==
Tom Bierbaum of Variety called the film "entertainingly weird, gross and amusing". Ray Loynd of the Los Angeles Times described it as a "charming oddity" that has "a brand of imagination you will never see on the commercial networks". Scott Hettrick of the Sun-Sentinel said, "After the somewhat entertaining over-the-top cartoonish humor of the first half, the movie inexplicably shifts to a semi-legitimate mystery thriller, all the while maintaining a colorful rural style." The Baltimore Sun praised Asner, saying he "gets his best role, and gives his finest performance, in years", and Tilly "notches another career triumph as the mystery girl". John Ferguson of the Radio Times complimented the ensemble cast and said Cryer "is as engaging as ever in this blackly comic mystery".

TV Guide rated it 2/4 stars and wrote, "Heads may leave viewers scratching theirs, but flaunts a cult-movie sensibility not normally associated with the small-screen fare", and appreciated that "graphic gore is mostly kept off-screen". The publication concluded the film "certainly has a look and attitude all its own".
