= La Salla =

- Directed by: Richard Condie
- Written by: Richard Condie
- Produced by: Richard Condie; Ches Yetman
- Starring: Jay Brazeau
- Music by: Patrick Godfrey
- Production company: National Film Board of Canada
- Release date: 1996
- Running time: 8 minutes
- Country: Canada
- Language: Italian

La Salla is a 1996 animated short by Richard Condie, produced in Winnipeg by the National Film Board of Canada.

The film is a farcical comic opera, with a libretto written by Condie and translated into Italian, then recorded by Jay Brazeau.

The film was nominated for an Academy Award for Best Animated Short Film at the 69th Academy Awards. It also won the award for best animation film at the Vancouver International Film Festival.

== Credits ==
- A Film by: Richard Condie
- Music & Sound Editing: Patrick Godfrey
- Baritone: Jay Brazeau
- Technical Coordinator: Scott Collins
- Studio Administrator: Cyndi Forcand
- Re-recording: Paul Sharpe
- Special Thanks To: Daniel Langlois and John Lasseter
- NFB Digital Imaging Services: Julie Dutrisac, Susan Gourley, Doris Kochanek
- Producers: Ches Yetman and Richard Condie
- Executive Producer: Ches Yetman
- La Salla - A National Film Board Of Canada Production
- Dolby Stereo® In Selected Theaters
- Dolby Surround™ Stereo On Videocassette
- © 1996 The National Film Board Of Canada
