= Dieppe (film) =

1993 Canadian miniseries

- Written by: John Krizanc
- Directed by: John N. Smith
- Starring: Victor Garber; John Neville; Kenneth Welsh; Robert Joy; Peter Donat
- Country of origin: Canada

Production
- Producer: Bernard Zukerman
- Running time: 180 minutes

Original release
- Network: CBC
- Release: 1993 – 1994

Dieppe is a two-part Canadian television miniseries that aired on CBC Television in 1993. It was based on the book Unauthorized Action: Mountbatten and the Dieppe Raid by Brian Loring Villa.

== Plot ==
=== Part 1 ===
The 2nd Canadian Infantry Division has been in England for two years during World War II. All ranks of the Canadian Army are anxious to see action but General Andrew McNaughton won't commit his four divisions piecemeal. A group of soldiers in The Royal Regiment of Canada start a food fight in protest of their living conditions, and Major-General John Hamilton Roberts is brought in to command the division.

General Eisenhower threatens to pull American forces out of Europe unless major ground action occurs in France in 1942. The British won't commit to an invasion of France since the majority of units involved would be British. Lord Mountbatten is given command of Combined Operations Headquarters and told to keep the pressure on the Germans in France with large scale commando raids in the absence of a major invasion. Desperate for something big to follow up the St Nazaire Raid, his headquarters comes up with the idea of landing at Dieppe. With the British Army off fighting in North Africa, the Canadians are "fully equipped" and ideal for the task but General McNaughton won't permit their use. When he travels back to Canada for meetings, Major-General Harry Crerar gives permission to use the Canadians behind his back. The British promise the Canadians full control over planning, but when Air Marshal Sir Arthur Harris refuses to commit heavy bombers and Admiral Sir Dudley Pound refuses to commit a battleship for fire support, they are forced to make compromises. General Bernard Montgomery calls the plan amateurish but the Canadians naively take to the training, eager to get into ground action in Europe before American forces. The troops embark on ships, but a German air raid convinces the planners surprise has been lost and the naval force commander, Admiral Baillie-Grohman, cancels the plan. General Montgomery is happy, recommending the raid be cancelled "for all time".

=== Part 2 ===
Lord Mountbatten despondently admits to his deputy, naval Captain John Hughes-Hallett, that the cancelled raid on Dieppe was his only plan for action in France. Hallett suggests remounting the raid. When Mountbatten objects, stating they'd never have permission from the Combined Chiefs of Staff, Hallett replies the chiefs will be too timid to stop them from continuing and they should simply continue as if they still have authorization. They talk General McNaughton into committing to the raid, and McNaughton tells Crerar that Mountbatten is the only British officer to treat him "like an equal, not a colonial".

General Roberts pursues a romantic relationship with Anne while Casey, a private in the Royals, pursues Leith, a married English woman whose husband is in North Africa with the RAF. When news arrives she is widowed, Casey goes absent without leave and proposes marriage. He returns to the Canadian base just as the trucks are departing for the port of embarkation for the Dieppe Raid.

During the crossing, a German warship fires on the convoy, eliminating the element of surprise. Hughes-Hallett, who replaced Baillie-Grohman as naval force commander by Mountbatten, urges Roberts to press on. The landings meet heavy German resistance and Roberts, on the command ship, feels the battle slip out of his control. The Royal Regiment of Canada comes ashore at Blue Beach into heavy defensive fires. Casey tries to blast through barbed wire on the seawall but is shot and killed by the blast of his own grenade. Sergeant Jawarski is wounded providing cover fire and when Major Magnus surrenders, he is one of the few survivors that goes into captivity. Major Morton, Jean, and Lionel have all been killed.

As the force returns to the UK, Leith searches the dock until Stefan, evacuated as a stretcher case, tells her Casey didn't survive. Lord Mountbatten begins a public relations campaign to turn the disaster into positive propaganda while Roberts is left to wonder if he's been made a scapegoat.

== Cast ==
- Victor Garber as Lord Louis Mountbatten
- John Neville as General Sir Alan Brooke
- Kenneth Welsh as Major General Harry Crerar
- Robert Joy as John Hughes-Hallett
- Peter Donat as Andrew McNaughton
- Marc Strange as Dwight D. Eisenhower
- W. B. Brydon as Winston Churchill
- Graham Harley as Bernard Law Montgomery
- Benedict Campbell as Trafford Leigh-Mallory
- Gary Reineke as John Hamilton Roberts
- John Mezon as Noël Coward
- Gabrielle Rose as Anne
- Larissa Laskin as Leith
- Michael Anderson Jr. as David Lean
- Gordon Currie as Stefan
- Ian Deakin as Cock-Martin
- Aidan Devine as Casey
- Tony Munch as Mess Soldier
- Nigel Bennett as Baillie-Grohman

== Reception ==
The CBC reported the miniseries was criticized for not being completely accurate, and overdramatizing the events that took place.

One Canadian military history website describes the film as "an enduring look at what life must have been like for both the soldiers of the Canadian Army in the early years of World War Two in England, and for their commanders who were facing multiple crises in the fields of military operations, diplomacy, and politics, both inter-service and on the civil front.

Reviewer Mark Hasan wrote the mini-series "manages to cover a lot of ground within its tight running time of 3 hours... and though made for a modest budget, the production looks very rich.

== Awards ==
Dieppe was nominated for 11 Gemini Awards, winning two including Best Mini-Series.

== Home media ==
The series was released on DVD by the CBC in 2002 just before the 60th anniversary of the Dieppe raid. The DVD included behind-the-scenes footage and various interviews and news stories that aired about the show in 1993 and 1994. Also included was a 1962 interview with both Lord Louis Mountbatten and John Hamilton Roberts, in which they discuss the key events of the raid, and the decisions they made surrounding this event.
