= Meredith Henderson =

Canadian actress

- Born: November 24, 1983 (age 41); Ottawa, Ontario, Canada
- Occupation: Actress
- Years active: 1991–present

Meredith Henderson (born November 24, 1983) is a Canadian actress known for playing the title role in The Adventures of Shirley Holmes.

She also had a leading role as wheelchair-using Cleo Bellows in the 2001 children's television series MythQuest opposite Christopher Jacot.

In 2005, she appeared in Shania: A Life in Eight Albums, a biopic of country star Shania Twain, in which she played the lead role. She did all the singing, dancing and guitar playing herself.

Henderson also had a recurring role as the girlfriend of Harris Allan's character Hunter on the critically acclaimed, groundbreaking gay TV series Queer as Folk.

Her sister is actress Beki Lantos.

== Filmography ==
Film
Year	Title	Role	Notes
1997	Kayla	Jaynie Nightingale	
2005	Shania: A Life in Eight Albums	Adult Shania Twain	
2006	Heartstopper	Sara Wexler	
2008	Jumper	Fiona	
2010	A Flesh Offering	Emily	
2018	The Downside of Bliss	Mrs. Denmark	

Television
Year	Title	Role	Notes
1995	The Song Spinner	Aurora	TV movie
1996	Goosebumps	Cara Renfield	Episode: "Vampire Breath"
1997-2000	The Adventures of Shirley Holmes	Shirley Holmes	52 episodes "Main Cast"
1999	Strange World	Student	Episode: "Eliza"
2000	The Fearing Mind	Catherine	Episode: "Good Harvest"
2000-2001	Big Sound	Phoebe Sutton	6 episodes
2001	MythQuest	Cleo Bellows	13 episodes
2001	A Wind at My Back Christmas	Anna Schiller	TV movie
2003	Just Cause	Geena Harrington	Episode: "Blackboard Jungle"
2003	Missing	Sara Denton	Episode: "White Whale"
2004	Puppets Who Kill	Button's Girlfriend	Episode: "Pizza Boys Are Missing"
2004	The Eleventh Hour	2 of 4 Wives	Episode: "Strange Bedfellows"
2004	Stranger at the Door	Tara Norris	TV movie
2004-2005	Queer as Folk	Callie Leeson	5 episodes
2005	Beach Girls	Young Maddie	TV miniseries
2005	Shania: A Life in Eight Albums	Eilleen Shania Twain	TV movie
2007	The Dresden Files	Caryn Harris / Nikki Slovak	Episode: "Rules of Engagement"
2007	The Best Years	Hillary Dunbar	Episode: "Notorious"; Episode: "All That Heaven Allows"
2007	Everest '82	Marlene	TV miniseries
2008	Flashpoint	Sadie O'Brien	Episode: "Asking for Flowers"

== Producer ==
- Shut up and deal (2007)

== Awards and nominations ==
Year	Award	Category	Title of work	Result
1998	Gemini Award	Best Performance in a Children's or Youth Program or Series	The Adventures of Shirley Holmes (for episode #1.13: "The Case of the Second Sight")	Nominated
1999	Gemini Award	Best Performance in a Children's or Youth Program or Series	The Adventures of Shirley Holmes (for episode #3.3: "The Case of the Crooked Comic")	Won
