= My Life as a Dog (TV series) =

- Based on: My Life as a Dog by Reidar Jönsson
- Developed by: Reidar Jönsson; Donna Matson-Jönsson; David Brandes; Barbara O'Kelly
- Starring: Michael Yarmush; Callum Keith Rennie; Jennifer Clement; Joy Coghill
- Composer: Randolph Peters
- Country of origin: Canada
- Original language: English
- No. of seasons: 1
- No. of episodes: 22

Production
- Executive producers: Martin Katz; Derek Mazur; David Brandes
- Running time: 30 minutes
- Production companies: Atlantis Films; Credo Entertainment Group

Original release
- Network: Showtime
- Release: September 8, 1996 – February 2, 1997

My Life as a Dog is a contemporary, half-hour Canadian drama series that ran for 22 episodes from September 8, 1996 until February 2, 1997. It was based on the 1985 Swedish movie of the same name and was developed for Canadian television by, among others, Reidar Jönsson, author of the original autobiographical book.

It is the coming of age story of a young boy, brutally dragged away from his familiar universe into an unknown world. Though aimed at teens, it has been rated above the usual "infantile sitcoms".

The series was shot on location in Winnipeg and Gimli, Manitoba. It was directed by Neill Fearnley and produced by Atlantis Films Limited and Credo Entertainment Group.

== Plot ==
After his mother's death and with his sailor father away at sea, imaginative 11-year-old Eric Johansson is sent to live in a small fishing village with his mother's twin brother, Johnny Johansson. Eric's adventures in Gimli will help him to feel at home with his new family and come to terms with some pre-adolescent uncertainties while Johnny, burdened with unexpected fatherly duties, has to make some choices he avoided to face before.

== Cast ==
- Michael Yarmush - Eric Johansson
- Callum Keith Rennie - Johnny Johansson
- Marley Otto - Anastasia 'AJ' Burke
- Jennifer Clement - Zoë Johansson
- Joy Coghill - Astrid 'Auntie Auntie' Árnesson
- Bucky Hill - Sam LaFresne
- Yank Azman - Tom Shaughnessy

== Awards ==
In 1997 Callum Keith Rennie won a Gemini Award for Best Performance in a Children's or Youth Program or Series for his role as Johnny Johansson. Michael Yarmush won the 1998 Young Artist Award for Best Performance in a TV Drama Series - Leading Young Actor and was nominated for a YoungStar Award for Best Performance by a Young Actor in a Drama TV Series the same year.

== Episodes ==
No.	Title	Directed by	Written by	Original release date
1	"The Arrival"	Michael Scott	Barbara O'Kelly	September 8, 1996
2	"Stranded"	Michael Scott	Charles Lazer	September 15, 1996
3	"Root of All Evil"	Neill Fearnley	David Young	September 22, 1996
4	"Smelly's Dark Secret"	Neill Fearnley	Ann MacNaughton	September 29, 1996
5	"Tribe"	Norma Bailey	Charles Lazer	October 6, 1996
6	"A Day in the Life"	Michael Scott	Tony DiFranco	October 13, 1996
7	"Great Expectations"	Neill Fearnley	David Young	October 20, 1996
8	"Profile of the Artist"	Michael Scott	Tony DiFranco	October 27, 1996
9	"The Fugitive"	Peter Rowe	Janet MacLean	November 3, 1996
10	"Widgeon"	Peter Rowe	Donna Matson-Jönsson	November 10, 1996
11	"Once They Get a Taste"	Unknown	Unknown	November 17, 1996
12	"The Puck Stops Here"	Jane Thompson	David Young	November 24, 1996
13	"Soap Gets in Your Eyes"	T.W. Peacocke	Janet MacLean	December 1, 1996
14	"Gimli Marathon"	Neill Fearnley	Barbara O'Kelly	December 8, 1996
15	"The Why? Files"	Neill Fearnley	Charles Lazer	December 15, 1996
16	"Beauty and the Zit"	Neill Fearnley	Ann MacNaughton	December 22, 1996
17	"Return of the Undead"	Neill Fearnley	Janet MacLean	December 29, 1996
18	"All in Your Head"	Neill Fearnley	Barbara O'Kelly	January 5, 1997
19	"A Winter's Tale"	Jane Thompson	Tony DiFranco	January 12, 1997
20	"Obsession"	Neill Fearnley	Ann MacNaughton	January 19, 1997
21	"Blizzard"	E. Jane Thompson	Ann MacNaughton	January 26, 1997
22	"Where the Wind Blows"	E. Jane Thompson	Barbara O'Kelly	February 2, 1997
