= The Big Snit =

1985 film

- Directed by: Richard Condie
- Written by: Richard Condie
- Produced by: Richard Condie; Michael Scott
- Starring: Jay Brazeau; Ida Osler; Randy Woods; Bill Guest
- Music by: Patrick Godfrey
- Distributed by: National Film Board of Canada
- Release date: August 1985
- Running time: 10 minutes
- Country: Canada
- Language: English

The Big Snit is a 1985 animated short film written and directed by Richard Condie and produced by the National Film Board of Canada.

== Plot ==
A married couple sit in their front room playing a game of Scrabble. The husband is stumped in his next move, and the wife gets up to vacuum while he tries to think of a word. He switches on the TV for his favourite TV show, Sawing for Teens, and dozes off. Sawing for Teens is interrupted by an emergency broadcast in which it is announced that a worldwide nuclear war has broken out. The cat chews on the TV's electrical cord and knocks out the TV before the husband can see the announcement. When he awakens, he looks out the window to see chaos in the streets, without any idea what it means. He sneaks a peek at his wife's letters. The wife, also unaware of the news, returns to the game, notices her letters have been moved, and accuses her husband of cheating. They argue and the wife runs out of the room in tears.

The husband, feeling sorry for arguing, spots an old photo of him and his wife at a fair, prompting memories of themselves in happier times. He approaches her with a concertina and begins playing on it. She softens up and the two embrace. The cat sits by the door to be let outside, and the husband reaches for the doorknob. At that moment, a white glow emanates from the keyhole and the husband is vapourized. He opens the door and the scene of chaos has been replaced by the sight of angels, clouds, and other heavenly objects. The couple, unaware of the cataclysm that has taken place, marvel at the beauty of the scene and decide to return to their Scrabble game.

== Voice cast ==
- Jay Brazeau as the Husband
- Ida Osler as the Wife
- Randy Woods as the "Sawing for Teens" Host
- Bill Guest as the Station Announcer

== Reception and legacy ==
The film received 17 awards including the Grand Prize at the Montreal World Film Festival, the Special Jury Award for Humour at the Zagreb World Festival of Animated Films, the Golden Space Needle for Best Short at the Seattle International Film Festival, Best Animated Film at the Tampere Film Festival, the Silver Plaque for Animation at the Chicago International Film Festival, the Hiroshima Prize at the Hiroshima International Animation Festival, the FIPRESCI International Film Critics' Prize at the Annecy International Animated Film Festival and a Genie Award for Best Animated Short. It was also nominated for an Academy Award for Best Animated Short Film at the 58th Academy Awards.

In 1994, it was voted #25 of the 50 Greatest Cartoons of all time by members of the animation field, and was the highest ranked cartoon in the list that was from the NFB. It was also included in the Animation Show of Shows. Animation expert Charles Solomon cited it as one of the best animated films of the 1980s.

=== In popular culture ===
The Big Snit inspired a Scrabble scene in the second episode of The Simpsons' first season, "Bart the Genius".
