= Jay Brazeau =

Canadian actor

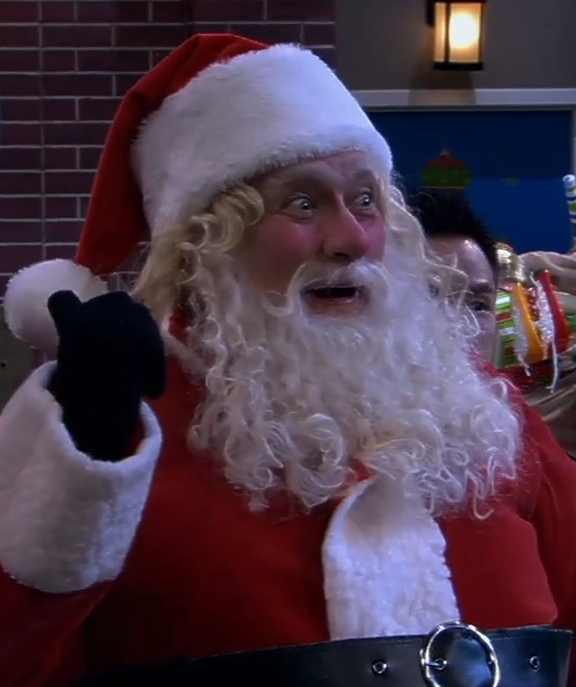
- Brazeau in Mr. Young
- Occupation: Actor
- Years active: 1975–present

Jay Brazeau is a Canadian actor, best known for his role as Sam Fisher in Cold Squad, Harlan in Stargate SG-1 (1998, 2001), and for voicing Uncle Quigley in Sabrina: The Animated Series. He is also known for his role as Bobby in Double Jeopardy (1999), as Referee in the Air Bud film series (1997–2003), and his film role in We're No Angels (1989).

== Career ==
In 1992, he appeared in an episode of Street Justice and two of the first-season episodes of Highlander: The Series. In 1998 he played Harlan in Stargate: SG1 Season 01 Episode 18 and the same character in a later episode in 2001. He also played "The Lord Protector" in Season 2 Episode 15 of Stargate: Atlantis. In October 2009, he appeared as "Man in chair" in the National Arts Centre production of The Drowsy Chaperone in Ottawa. In 2009, he played a part in several scenes added for the Ultimate Cut version of Watchmen. He was a frequent co-star of Don S. Davis.

Brazeau voiced Uncle Quigley in Sabrina: The Animated Series, Mr. Pretty in The Cramp Twins and Stavros Garkos in Hurricanes. His voice credits also include two Winnipeg-produced National Film Board of Canada animated shorts, "Get a Job" and "La Salla".

He portrayed Edna Turnblad in the Arts Club Theatre Company's production of Hairspray during the 2010/2011 season. Brazeau based his performance as Edna on his mother and an adult neighbor from his childhood nicknamed Fat Kay.

== Personal life ==
On May 12, 2011, Brazeau suffered a minor stroke while changing costumes backstage 30 minutes into a preview performance of Hairspray. His role was filled by Andy Toth during his absence. Brazeau missed 36 performances before making a full recovery and returning to the production.

== Filmography ==
=== Film ===
Year	Title	Role	Notes
1975	The Melting Pot	General Slam	
1987	Backfire	Junior	
1989	We're No Angels	Sheriff	
1990	Short Time	Cop	
1990	Cadence	Mr. Vito	
1990	The Comic Book Christmas Caper	Voice	
1991	Showdown at Williams Creek	"Pig Man"	
1991	The Grocer's Wife	Barber	
1991	Cafe Romeo	The Dean	
1992	North of Pittsburgh	Leon	
1992	The Date	Carmen's Father	
1993	Cool Runnings	Kroychzech	
1994	Intersection	Businessman	
1994	Andre	Griffin "Griff" Armstrong	
1994	Little Women	Dashwood	
1995	Dream Man	Sergeant Abe Foreman	Direct-to-video
1995	Slam Dunk Ernest	Mr. Zamiel Moloch	Direct-to-video
1995	Urban Safari	Carl Johnson	
1995	Live Bait	Uncle Don	
1995	Malicious	Orderly	
1995	Gold Diggers: The Secret of Bear Mountain	Everett Graham	
1996	Kissed	Mr. Walls	
1997	Dazzle the Dinosaur	Quetzalcoatlus	Voice; direct-to-video
1997	Warriors of Virtue	Willy Beest	Voice
1997	Air Bud	Referee 1	
1997	Masterminds	Eliot	
1997	Kitchen Party	Fred	
1998	The Animated Adventures of Tom Sawyer	Muff Potter	Voice; direct-to-video
1998	Disturbing Behavior	Principal Weathers	
1998	Hoods	Johnny	
1998	Air Bud: Golden Receiver	Official	
1999	Better Than Chocolate	Mr. Marcus	
1999	Turbulence 2: Fear of Flying	Harold	
1999	Snow Falling on Cedars	Reporter	
1999	Double Jeopardy	Bobby Long	
1999	Noroc	Charlie	
2000	MVP: Most Valuable Primate	Harry	
2000	Suspicious River	Suitcase Man	
2000	Best in Show	Dr. Chuck Nelken	
2000	How to Kill Your Neighbor's Dog	Proctologist	
2000	Middlemen	Truscott	
2000	Air Bud: World Pup	Referee #1	Direct-to-video
2001	Head over Heels	Halloran / Strukov	
2001	Last Wedding	Noah's Father	
2001	The Shipment	Marty	
2001	Kevin of the North	Mr. Riskind	
2002	Snow Dogs	Race Official #2	
2002	Air Bud: Seventh Inning Fetch	Professor Siles	
2002	K-9: P.I.	Dr. Tilley	
2002	Insomnia	Detective Francis	
2002	They	Dr. Booth	
2002	Cheats	Dr. Fox	
2003	A Guy Thing	Howard	
2003	House of the Dead	Captain	
2003	Spymate	The Ringmaster	
2003	Spook	The Big Boss	
2003	Moving Malcolm	George Maxwell	
2004	The Perfect Score	Test Instructor	
2004	The Truth About Miranda	Mr. Merkin	
2004	Going the Distance	Store Clerk	
2007	The Sandlot: Heading Home	Dr. Parker	Direct-to-video
2007	Taming Tammy	Bob	
2007	Bratz: Super Babyz	Spud	Voice
2007	The Secret	Doug Sullivan	
2008	Blonde and Blonder	Louie Ramoli	
2008	Edison and Leo	Captain Samuel Edison	Voice
2008	Far Cry	Ralph	
2008	Bratz Babyz Save Christmas	Ralph	Voice; direct-to-video
2008	Thomas Kinkade's Christmas Cottage	Mr. Rosa	
2009	Ratko: The Dictator's Son	Professor Grubbspeck	
2009	Hulk Vs.	Volstagg	Direct-to-video
2009	Watchmen	News Vendor	
2009	Personal Effects	Martin	
2009	Dr. Dolittle: Million Dollar Mutts	Mr. Dean	Direct-to-video
2010	Gunless	Dr. Angus Schiffron	
2010	Fathers & Sons	Anton	
2010	Bratz: Pampered Petz	Mr. Grunion	Voice; direct-to-video
2010	Guido Superstar: The Rise of Guido	"Fever"	
2011	Sisters & Brothers	Ringo	
2012	The Possession	Professor McMannis	
2012	Santa Paws 2: The Santa Pups	Judge	
2013	Sex After Kids	Horton	
2013	Super Buddies	Mr. Swanson	Direct-to-video
2013	Horns	Father Mould	
2013	Down River	Larry	
2013	That Burning Feeling	Dr. Fishbaum	
2014	Step Up: All In	Mr. McGowan	
2014	Barbie and the Secret Door	Mr. Primrose	Voice
2014	Bad City	Mayor W. Whilhelm Douglas	
2015	Eadweard	The M.C.	
2017	The Shack	Tony	
2019	Noelle	Santa	

=== Television ===
Year	Title	Role	Notes
1982	The Minikins	Baker	2 episodes
1985	Brotherly Love	Dr. Hollis	Television film
1986	The Magical World of Disney	Zoo Guard	Episode: "Hero in the Family"
1987	Trying Times	2nd Driving Instructor	Episode: "Drive, She Said"
1987–1990	21 Jump Street	Various Roles	8 episodes
1988	The Red Spider	Epstein	Television film
1988, 1990	MacGyver	Zamora / AF Colonel Phelps	2 episodes
1988–1990	Wiseguy	Sig Rosen / Ovitz / Gino	3 episodes
1989	Unsub	Detective Burns	Episode: "And They Swam Right Over the Dam"
1989–1990	Booker	Sergeant Keith Redding	4 episodes
1990	Danger Bay	Clinton Mack	Episode: "Live Wires"
1990	It	Derry Cab Driver	Episode: "Part 2"
1990	Bordertown	Judge Eric Mueller	Episode: "A Question of Negligence"
1990	Mom P.I.	Ken	Episode: "Spinal Trap"
1990–1994	Neon Rider	Murray Walsh / Alonzo / Teddy	3 episodes
1991	Blood River	Hotchner	Television film
1991	Bucky O'Hare and the Toad Wars!	Toad Air Marshal	13 episodes
1991	The Commish	Aaron Hoyle	Episode: "The Commissioner's Ball"
1991–1992	Captain Zed and the Zee Zone	"Snort"	26 episodes
1992	To Catch a Killer	Jake Miller	Television film
1992	Lost in the Barrens II: The Curse of the Viking Grave	"Big Nose"	Television film
1992	The Comrades of Summer	Tom	Television film
1992	The Heights	Rabbi Klein	Episode: "What Does It Take?"
1992	Highlander: The Series	Commissioner Cominski	2 episodes
1993	The Diviners	Gus	Television film
1993	Without a Kiss Goodbye	Dr. Spooner	Television film
1993	Born Too Soon	Dr. Wolf	Television film
1993	For the Love of My Child: The Anissa Ayala Story	Dr. M. Shapiro	Television film
1993	Street Justice	Sheriff Andy	Episode: "My Brother's Keeper"
1993	Cobra	Sheriff Andy Jax	Episode: "Honeymoon Hideaway"
1993–1996	Adventures of Sonic the Hedgehog	Spelunk / Santa Claus / Additional Voices	65 episodes
1993–1994	Madeline	Voice	20 episodes
1994	Tears and Laughter: The Joan and Melissa Rivers Story	Shrink	Television film
1994	The Diary of Evelyn Lau	Dr. Hightower	Television film
1994	Party of Five	Pawnbroker	Episode: "Pilot"
1994	Lonesome Dove: The Series	Mr. Cobb	2 episodes
1994	Mega Man	Eugene Peister	Episode: "20,000 Leaks Under the Sea"
1994	The X-Files	Dr. Daly / Professor Varnes	Episodes: "Lazarus"; "One Breath"
1994	The Odyssey	Sy	5 episodes
1994–1995	Hurricanes	Stavros Garkos	7 episodes
1995	Sliders	KGB Colonel	Episode: "Pilot"
1995	Johnny's Girl	Tony Cozart	Television film
1995	The Ranger, the Cook and a Hole in the Sky	"Doc" Riley	Television film
1995	The Marshal	Judge Schlosenberger	Episode: "The New Marshal"
1995	A Dream Is a Wish Your Heart Makes: The Annette Funicello Story	Uncle Pete	Television film
1995	The New Adventures of Madeline	Voice	13 episodes
1995	Bye Bye Birdie	The Mayor	Television film
1995	My Life as a Dog	Rupert Smedley / Smelly	3 episodes
1995	Jake and the Kid	Professor Claudius T. Winesinger	Episode: "Liar Hunter"
1996	The Prisoner of Zenda, Inc.	Professor Wooley	Television film
1996	North of 60	Doug, The Pilot	Episode: "Fear of Flying"
1996, 1998	Poltergeist: The Legacy	Peter Tomanski / Sam MacAllister	2 episodes
1997	Dead Man's Gun	Mayor William Dodson / Dobbs	2 episodes
1997	The Sentinel	Store Owner	Episode: "Pennies from Heaven"
1997	Extreme Dinosaurs	Additional Voices	Episode: "Out of Time"
1997	Trucks	Jack	Television film
1997, 1998	The Adventures of Shirley Holmes	Frank Patterson	2 episodes
1998	Pocket Dragon Adventures	Additional Voices	104 episodes
1998–1999	RoboCop: Alpha Commando	Voice	40 episodes
1998, 2001	Stargate SG-1	Harlan	2 episodes
1998, 2001	The Outer Limits	Dr. George Bader / Bernard Katz	2 episodes
1998–2001	Cold Squad	Sam Fisher	52 episodes
1999	Millennium	Selwyn Wassenaar	Episode: "Antipas"
1999	Viper	Dr. Norwood	2 episodes
1999	Sabrina: The Animated Series	Uncle Quigley	65 episodes
2000	2gether: The Series	Billy Fullerton	Television film
2000	Seven Days	Father Carlo	Episode: "Pope Parker"
2000	My Mother, the Spy	George Trumbell	Television film
2000	Generation O!	Colonel Bob	2 episodes
2000	So Weird	Mr. Cox	Episode: "Detention"
2000	Ed	Southern Lawyer Sam	Episode: "Pilot"
2000	First Wave	Speidel	Episode: "Unearthed"
2000	Murder at the Cannes Film Festival	Mitch Borelli	Television film
2000–2002	What About Mimi?	Voice	39 episodes
2001	Voyage of the Unicorn	Mage	2 episodes
2001	The Wedding Dress	Art Panner	Television film
2001	Da Vinci's Inquest	Mr. Dupont	Episode: "Be a Cruel Twist"
2001	Mysterious Ways	Mr. Billington	Episode: "The Last Dance"
2001–2003	Sitting Ducks	Waddle	26 episodes
2001–2005	The Cramp Twins	Mr. Pretty / Harry	11 episodes
2002	UC: Undercover	Ben Poptanich	Episode: "Teddy C"
2002	My Guide to Becoming a Rock Star	Sarah's Boss	Episode: "Pay to Play"
2002	Living with the Dead	Psychiatrist	Television film
2002	Pasadena	Dr. Allen	Episode: "Run Lily Run"
2002	Sabrina: Friends Forever	Uncle Eustace	Television film
2002	Saint Sinner	Abbott	Television film
2002	Taken	Dr. Shilling	Episode: "Acid Tests"
2002	Society's Child	Dr. Stone	Television film
2003	The Stranger Beside Me	Judge Cowart	Television film
2003	He-Man and the Masters of the Universe	Vormus	Episode: "Separation"
2003	Dead Like Me	Dr. Levy	Episode: "Rest in Peace"
2003	Gadget & the Gadgetinis	Gardener	51 episodes
2004	The Legend of Butch & Sundance	Railroad Company Executive	Television film
2005	The West Wing	Mackey Lowell	Episode: "Freedonia"
2005	Masters of Horror	Mr. Dombrowski, Manager	Episode: "Dreams in the Witch-House"
2005	Killer Instinct	Adam Benton	Episode: "Shake, Rattle, and Roll"
2005	Stargate Atlantis	Lord Protector	Episode: "The Tower"
2006	Presumed Dead	Professor Dunnigan	Television film
2006	A Girl Like Me: The Gwen Araujo Story	Defense Attorney	Television film
2006	Whistler	Darren Furlong	2 episodes
2006	Trophy Wife	Harry	Television film
2006	Last Chance Cafe	Agent Baker	Television film
2006	Christmas on Chestnut Street	Santa	Television film
2006, 2010	Supernatural	Dr. Corman / Librarian	2 episodes
2007	Falcon Beach	Lester Shelby	Episode: "The Spins"
2007	My Baby Is Missing	Dolan Severs	Television film
2007	Blood Ties	Cobb	Episode: "Gifted"
2008	Psych	Director	Episode: "Lights, Camera... Homicidio"
2008	Reaper	Demon Speaker	Episode: "Rebellion"
2009	Polar Storm	Mr. Elman	Television film
2009	Harper's Island	Dr. Campbell	3 episodes
2009	Eureka	Captain Yuri Gregor	Episode: "Have an Ice Day"
2010	Tower Prep	"Science"	Episode: "New Kid"
2011	The Killing	Judge Russell Elliot	Episode: "Undertow"
2011	To the Mat	Talbot	Television film
2011	The Pastor's Wife	Gene Castle	Television film
2011	Seattle Superstorm	Dimitri Kandinsky	Television film
2011, 2012	Mr. Young	Santa	2 episodes
2012	A Dog Named Duke	Dr. Jamison	Television film
2012	A Mother's Nightmare	Donald Mojan	Television film
2012	Love at the Thanksgiving Day Parade	Doorman	Television film
2012	Level Up	Wizard	Episode: "Intelligence Potion #9"
2013	Cedar Cove	Mayor Louie Hanson	2 episodes
2013	Jinxed	Grandpa	Television film
2013	Hats Off to Christmas!	Michael Bowers	Television film
2014	Grumpy Cat's Worst Christmas Ever	Roger	Television film
2014	A Christmas Tail	Mr. Harvey	Television film
2014	My Little Pony: Friendship Is Magic	Various Roles	3 episodes
2015	I Do, I Do, I Do	Phillip Lorenzo	Television film
2015	The Whispers	Rabbi Ezra	Episode: "Broken Child"
2015	Once Upon a Holiday	Harry Ballantyne	Television film
2015–2019	Garage Sale Mystery	Coroner Tramill	13 episodes
2016	Unser Traum von Kanada	Phil	Episode: "Alles auf Anfang"
2016	Dying to Be Loved	Al Jennings	Television film
2016	Bates Motel	Justin Willcock	Episode: "Norman"
2016	Beat Bugs	Octopus	2 episodes
2016	Dirk Gently's Holistic Detective Agency	John Dollow	Episode: "Rogue Wall Enthusiasts"
2017	The Exorcist	Tribunal President	Episode: "Safe as Houses"
2017	Christmas Homecoming	Tom	Television film
2017	Finding Santa	Tom White	Television film
2018	The Dragon Prince	Doctor	Episode: "The Dagger and The Wolf"
2019	Unspeakable	Dr. John Furesz	3 episodes
2020	Good Morning Christmas!	Stan Roman	Television film
2020	Five Star Christmas	Walter Ralston	Television film
2021	Firefly Lane	Torcoletti	Episode: "Dancing Queens"
