= Get a Job (1985 film) =

1985 short film

Get a Job is a 1985 comedic musical animated short by Brad Caslor, featuring a rendition of the song of the same name, made famous by The Silhouettes. Produced by the National Film Board of Canada in Winnipeg, the project took Caslor seven years to complete, from conception to release. Caslor began the film as a social guidance film for the Canadian government, however, during production it evolved into a more comedic work, incorporating a wide range of classic animation characters and techniques, including the styles of Tex Avery and Bob Clampett. Al Simmons and Jay Brazeau performed the music in the film, which received the Academy of Canadian Cinema and Television Award for Best Animated Short at the 8th Genie Awards.

Fellow Winnipeg animator Cordell Barker did animation work on the film.

== Plot ==
The cartoon begins with Bob Dog walking into town. Suddenly he meets three singers and attempts to find a job, but it backfires when Bob got booted out for each attempt. Discouraged, Bob returns to his apartment and watches television about a couple getting divorced. He doses off to sleep and starts to dream.

In Bob's dream, he encounters several singers about jobs ending with a trio of singing female pigs. He gets his resume and strolls into the city, dodging cars and enters a building with his scheduled resume appointments. He enters a room filled with a bunch of angry people staring at him. When the attendant calls Bob's name, he nervously walks to the office with the people still staring down at him. Just as he arrives at the office, the attendant instantly kicks him out. The singing pigs appear again, giving him a second chance. This time, Bob becomes aggressive and grows into a muscular size. He barges into a boss's office and attacks him, throwing him into a wall. He tries to have a job at this office, but the angry boss grabs Bob and kicks him out, and crashes into an elevator. The singing pigs once again give him one more chance. Another boss calls out “Next!”, and Bob enters with a bunch of instruments attached to him, only for the boss to use the trap door on him.

Bob finds himself out on the streets in a trash can, and meets a group of street cats. They mock him about getting a job. And Bob screams while the cats continue to taunt him. Suddenly Bob wakes up from his dream with the television still on. The telephone rings and Bob answers it, and he received a call from his dad that he got the job, much to his delight, ending the cartoon.

== See also ==
- K-Tel
- Doo-wop
- The Andrews Sisters, whom the singing female pigs resembled.
