= Pigbird =

Pig Bird
- Film poster
- Directed by: Richard Condie
- Produced by: Derek Mazur
- Production companies: National Film Board of Canada; Revenue Canada
- Release date: 1981
- Running time: 3 minutes
- Country: Canada
- Language: English

Pigbird is a 1981 animated short comedy film directed by Richard Condie. The film was cooperated by the now defunct Canadian Pacific Airlines (which at the time was originally called CP Air), and shown and produced by Revenue Canada. The animated film is a public service announcement about custom safety.

== Plot ==
The plot tells the story of a couple bringing an exotic creature to the customs check in with the customs officers, noticing the Pigbird, stating that it's banned in Canada. Then, he proceeds to tell the story about how one citizen was sneaking the Pigbird creature through customs illegally. Once he arrives home with it, he finds out the hard way the creature has been infected with exotic insects inside its fur, shaking it off and trying and failing to get rid of the bugs. However, the bugs multiply and cover the inside of the house, the man bursting the door open while the insects from Pigbird spread to the city, cause a bird that eats one to blow up and explode, invade buses and buildings, crawling all over every citizen, and eventually, the plants all get eaten.

Back in reality, once the custom officer finishes the tale with the couple leaving the Pigbird with him, the narrator speaks, "Customs regulations are designed to protect all Canadians and our environment. Please learn them." The short ends with the husband getting in trouble with the customs officer and his wife glaring at him when his sleeve goes down upon waving, showing he has many watches including a clock that had a tiny Pigbird singing.

== Awards ==
- Zagreb Film Festival, Poland, The Golden Gram, Educational, 1981
- Ottawa International Animation Festival, Canada, Commercial Shorts Under 5 Minutes, 1982
- ALA Notable Children's Videos, 1983.
