= Cilento (disambiguation) =

Cilento is an Italian geographical region. The adjective is Cilentan. For example:

- Cilentan Coast
- Cilentan language

Cilento may also refer to:

People

- Diane Cilento (1933–2011), Australian theatre and film actress
- Giuseppe Cilento (1923–1994), Brazilian chemist
- Phyllis Cilento, Australian medical practitioner and journalist specialising in health of mothers and children
- Raphael Cilento (1893–1985), Australian medical practitioner notable in the field of tropical medicine
- Wayne Cilento (born 1949), American dancer and choreographer

Places in the Cilento region of Italy

- Cilento and Vallo di Diano National Park
