= Claire Wainwright =

Australian paediatric respiratory physician

Claire E. Wainwright AM FAHMS
- Known for: Cystic fibrosis
- Awards: Member of the Order of Australia (2018); Fellow of the Australian Academy of Health and Medical Sciences (2016)
- Scientific career
- Fields: Pediatric Respiratory Medicine
- Workplaces: Children's Health Queensland Hospital and Health Service
- Website: www.childrens.health.qld.gov.au/researchers-professor-claire-wainwright/

Claire E. Wainwright is an Australian paediatric respiratory physician and professor of pediatrics, residing and working in Queensland. She commenced her medical training in London and completed her specialist training at the Royal Children's Hospital, Brisbane. She is now head of the Cystic Fibrosis Service at the Queensland Children's Hospital and a professor of pediatric medicine at the University of Queensland, Australia. Wainwright has published numerous academic papers focusing upon her main area of interest; the impacts of fungal infections upon children with cystic fibrosis. However, her interests also expand to include other airway complications within children.

== Personal life ==
Claire Wainwright is of European descent, she is half French and half Welsh. She grew up in the Middle East, but then attended medical school in London. After marrying Australian Professor Brandon Wainwright, she moved to Queensland where she completed her medical training.

== Career ==
Wainwright decided to pursue research medicine after doing a research elective with the paediatric renal team at Guy's Hospital London. Since then she has collaborated on 43 academic articles investigating cystic fibrosis and other respiratory issues in children. She is currently employed by the Queensland Children's Hospital and the University of Queensland as a professor of Paediatrics and Child Health.

In 2016, Wainwright was elected Fellow of the Australian Academy of Health and Medical Sciences.

== Publications by Wainwright ==
Moodie M, Lal A, Vidmar S, Armstrong DS, Byrnes CA, Carlin JB, Cheney J, Cooper PJ, Grimwood K, Robertson CF, Tiddens HA, Wainwright CE (July 2014). "Costs of Bronchoalveolar Lavage-Directed Therapy in the First 5 Years of Life for Children with Cystic Fibrosis". Journal of Pediatrics. 165 (3): 564–569.e5. doi:10.1016/j.jpeds.2014.05.031. PMID 24996984.

Syrmis MW, Kidd TJ, Moser RJ, Ramsay KA, Gibson KM, Anuj S, Bell SC, Wainwright CE, Grimwood K, Nissen M, Slots TP, Whiley DM (June 2014). "A Comparison of Two Informative SNP-based Strategies for Typing Pseudomonas Aeruginosa Isolates from Patients with Cystic Fibrosis". BMC Infectious Diseases. 5 (14): 307. doi:10.1186/1471-2334-14-307. PMC 4053291. PMID 24902856.

Wainwright CE, Tullis E (May 2014). "Electronic Care Records – Can They Fulfil Their Promise?". Journal of Cystic Fibrosis. 13 (6): 608–609. doi:10.1016/j.jcf.2014.04.009. PMID 24862725.

Knibbs LD, Johnson GR, Kidd TJ, Cheney J, Grimwood K, Kattenbelt JA, O'Rourke PK, Ramsay KA, Sly PD, Wainwright CE, Wood ME, Morawska L, Bell SC (August 2014). "Viability of Pseudomonas Aeruginosa in Cough Aerosols Generated by Persons with Cystic Fibrosis". Thorax. 69 (8): 740–5. doi:10.1136/thoraxjnl-2014-205213. PMC 4112489. PMID 24743559.

Hennig S, McKay K, Vidmar S, O'Brien K, Stacey S, Cheney J, Wainwright CE (July 2014). "Safety of Inhaled (Tobi) and Intravenous Tobramycin in Young Children with Cystic Fibrosis". Journal of Cystic Fibrosis. 13 (4): 428–434. doi:10.1016/j.jcf.2014.01.014. hdl:11343/190673. PMID 24565869.

Ramsay KA, Butler CA, Paynter S, Ware RS, Kidd TJ, Wainwright CE, Bell SC (December 2013). "Factors Influencing Acquisition of Burkholderia Cepacia Complex Organisms in Patients with Cystric Fibrosis". Journal of Clinical Microbiology. 51 (12): 3975–80. doi:10.1128/jcm.01360-13. PMC 3838027. PMID 24048536.

Manos J, Hu H, Rose BR, Wainwright CE, Zablotska IB, Cheney J, Turnbull L, Whitchurch CB, Grimwood K, Harmer C, Anuj SN, Harbour C (December 2013). "Virulence Factor Expression Patterns in Pseudomonas Aeruginosa Strains from Infants with Cystic Fibrosis". European Journal of Clinical Microbiology & Infectious Diseases. 32 (12): 1583–92. doi:10.1007/s10096-013-1916-7. hdl:10453/24213. PMID 23832143. S2CID 17974123.

Davies JC, Wainwright CE, Canny GJ, Chilvers MA, Howenstine MS, Munck A, Mainz JG, Rodriguez S, Li H, Yen K, Ordonez CL, Ahrens R (June 2013). "Efficacy and Safety of Ivacaftor in Patients Aged 6 to 11 Years with Cystic Fibrosis with a G551D Mutation". American Journal of Respiratory and Critical Care Medicine. 187 (11): 1219–25. doi:10.1164/rccm.201301-0153oc. PMC 3734608. PMID 23590265.

Syrmis MW, Moser RJ, Kidd TJ, Hunt P, Ramsa KA, Bell SC, Wainwright CE, Grimwood K, Nissen MD, Sloots TP, Whiley DM (May 2013). "High-throughput Single-nucleotide Polymorphism-based Typing of Shared Pseudomonas Aeruginosa Stains in Cystic Fibrosis Patients Using the Sequenom iPLEX Platform". Journal of Medical Microbiology. 62 (5): 734–40. doi:10.1099/jmm.0.055905-0. PMID 23412772.

Byrnes CA, Vidmar S, Cheney JL, Carlin JB, Armstrong DS, Cooper PJ, Grimwood K, Moodie M, Roberston CF, Rosenfield M, Tiddens HA, Wainwright CE (July 2013). "Prospective Evaluation of Respiratory Exacerbations in Children with Cystic Fibrosis from Newborn Screening". Thorax. 68 (7): 643–51. doi:10.1136/thoraxjnl-2012-202342. PMC 3711493. PMID 23345574.

Kidd TJ, Ramsay KA, Hu H, Marks GB, Wainwright CE, Bye PT, Elkins MR, Robinson PJ, Rose BR, Wilson JW, Grimwood K, Bell SC (May 2013). "Shared Pseudomonas Aeruginosa Genotypes are Common in Australian Cystic Fibrosis Centres". European Respiratory Journal. 41 (5): 1091–100. doi:10.1183/09031936.00060512. PMID 22878877.

Willner D, Daly J, Whiley D, Grimwood K, Wainwright CE, Hugenholtz P (2012). "Comparison of DNA Extraction Methods for Microbial Community Profiling with an Application to Pediatric Bronchoalveolar Lavage Samples". PLOS ONE. 7 (4) e34605. Bibcode:2012PLoSO...734605W. doi:10.1371/journal.pone.0034605. PMC 3326054. PMID 22514642.

Hu H, Harmer C, Anuj S, Wainwright CE, Manos J, Cheney J, Harbour C, Zablotska I, Turnbull L, Whitchurch CB, Grimwood K, Rose B (March 2013). "Type 3 Secretion System Effector Genotype and Secretion Phenotype of Longitudinally Collected Pseudomonas aeruginosa Isolates from Young Children Diagnosed with Cystic Fibrosis Following Newborn Screening". Clinical Microbiology and Infection. 19 (3): 266–72. doi:10.1111/j.1469-0691.2012.03770.x. PMID 22329595.

Collaco JM, McGready J, Green DM, Naughton KM, Watson CP, Chields T, Bell SC, Wainwright CE (2011). "Effect of Temperature on Cystic Fibrosis Lung Disease and Infections: a Replicated Cohort Study". PLOS ONE. 6 (11) e27784. Bibcode:2011PLoSO...627784C. doi:10.1371/journal.pone.0027784. PMC 3220679. PMID 22125624.

Ramsey BW, Davies J, McElvaney NG, Tullis E, Bell SC, Drevinek P, Griese M, McKone EF, Wainwright CE, Konstan MW, Moss R, Ratjen F, SErmt-Gaudelus I, Rowe SM, Dong Q, Rodriguez S, Yen K, Ordonez C, Elbron JS (November 2011). "A CFTR Potentiator in Patients with Cystic Fibrosis and the G551D Mutation" (PDF). New England Journal of Medicine. 365 (18): 1663–72. doi:10.1056/nejmoa1105185. PMC 3230303. PMID 22047557.

Strachan RE, Cornelius A, Gilbert GL, Gulliver T, Martin A, McDonald T, Nixon GM, Roseby R, Ranganathan S, Selvadurai H, Smith G, Soto-Martinez M, Suresh S, Teoh L, Thapa K, Wainwright CE, Jaffe A (October 2011). "Bacterial Causes of Empyema in Children, Australia, 2007–2009". Emerging Infectious Diseases. 17 (10): 1839–45. doi:10.3201/eid1710.101825. PMC 3310657. PMID 22000353.

Strachan RE, Cornelius A, Gilbert GL, Gulliver T, Martin A, McDonald T, Nixon G, Roseby R, Ranganathan S, Selvadurai H, Smith G, Soto-Martinez M, Suresh S, Teoh L, Thapa K, Wainwright CE, Jaffe A (January 2012). "Pleural Fluid Nucleic Acid Testing Enhances Pneumococcal Surveillance in Children". Respirology. 17 (1): 114–9. doi:10.1111/j.1440-1843.2011.02035.x. PMID 21848709. S2CID 205481686.

Wainwright CE, Vidmar S, Armstrong DS, Byrnes CA, Carlin JB, Cheney J, Cooper PJ, Grimwood K, Moodie M, Robertson CF, Tiddens HA (July 2011). "Effect of Bronchoalveolar Lavage-directed Therapy on Pseudomonas Aeruginosa Infection and Structural Lung Injury in Children with Cystic Fibrosis: a Randomised Trial". JAMA. 306 (2): 163–71. doi:10.1001/jama.2011.954. PMID 21750293.

Wainwright CE, Quittner AL, Geller DE, Nakamura C, Wooldridge JL, Gibson RL, Lewis S, Montgomery AB (July 2011). "Aztreonam for Inhalation Solution (AZLI) in Patients with Cystic Fibrosis, Mild Lung Impairment, and P. Aeruginosa". Journal of Cystic Fibrosis. 10 (4): 234–42. doi:10.1016/j.jcf.2011.02.007. PMID 21441078.

Reddel HK, Lim TK, Mishima M, Wainwright CE, Knight DA (April 2011). "Year-in-review 2010: Asthma, COPD, Cystic Fibrosis and Airway Biology". Respirology. 16 (3): 540–52. doi:10.1111/j.1440-1843.2011.01949.x. PMID 21338438.

Anuj SN, Whiley DM, Kidd TJ, Ramsay KA, Bell SC, Syrmis MW, Grimwood K, Wainwright CE, Nissen MD, Sloots TP (September 2011). "Rapid Single-nucleotide Polymorphism-based Identification of Clonal Pseudomonas aeruginosa Isolates from Patients with Cystic Fibrosis by the Use of Real-time PCR and High-resolution Melting Curve Analysis". Clinical Microbiology and Infection. 17 (9): 1403–8. doi:10.1111/j.1469-0691.2010.03439.x. hdl:10453/13814. PMID 21129101.

Strachan RE, Cornelius A, Gilbert GL, Gulliver T, Martin A, McDonald T, Nixon GM, Roseby R, RanganathanS, Selvadurai H, Smith G, Soto-Martinez M, Suresh S, Teoh L, Thapa K, Wainwright CE, Jaffe A (February 2011). "A Bedside Assay to Detect Streptococcus Pneumoniae in Children with Empyema". Pediatric Pulmonology. 46 (2): 179–83. doi:10.1002/ppul.21349. PMID 20963842. S2CID 34132325.

Douglas TA, Brennan S, Berry L, Winfield K, Wainwright CE, Grimwood K, Stick SM, Sly SD (November 2010). "Value of Serology in Predicting Pseudomonas Aeruginosa Infection in Young Children with Cystic Fibrosis". Thorax. 65 (11): 985–90. doi:10.1136/thx.2009.132845. hdl:10072/60055. PMID 20889526.

Xu C, Jackson M, Scuffham PA, Wootton R, Simpson P, Whitty J, Wolfe R, Wainwright CE (September 2010). "A Randomised Controlled Trial of an Interactive Voice Response Telephone System and Specialist Nurse Support for Childhood Asthma Management". Journal of Asthma. 47 (7): 768–73. doi:10.3109/02770903.2010.493966. PMID 20716014. S2CID 42425011.

Kidd TJ, Marks GB, Bye PT, Wainwright CE, Robinson PJ, Rose BR, Harbour C, Bell SC (September 2009). "Multi-centre Research in Australia: Analysis of a Recent National Health and Medical Research Council-funded Project". Respirology. 14 (7): 1051–5. doi:10.1111/j.1440-1843.2009.01595.x. PMID 19740265. S2CID 45048325.

Wainwright CE, France MW, O'Rourke P, Anuj S, Kidd TJ, Nissen MD, Sloots TP, Coulter C, Ristovski Z, Hargreaves M, Rose BR, Harbour C, Bell SC, Fennelly KP (November 2009). "Cough-generated Aerosols of Pseudomonas Aeruginosa and other Gram-negative Bacteria from Patients with Cystic Fibrosis". Thorax. 64 (11): 926–31. doi:10.1136/thx.2008.112466. PMC 2764123. PMID 19574243.

Kidd TJ, Ramsay KA, Hu H, Bye PT, Elkins MR, Grimwood K, Harbour C, Marks GB, Nissen MD, Robinson PJ, Rose BR, Sloots TP, Wainwright CE, Bell SC (May 2009). "Low RAtes of Pseudomonas Aeruginosa Misidentification in Isolates from Cystic Fibrosis Patients". Journal of Clinical Microbiology. 47 (5): 1503–9. doi:10.1128/jcm.00014-09. PMC 2681828. PMID 19261796.

Anuj SN, Whiley DM, Kidd TJ, Bell SC, Wainwright CE, Nissen MD, Sloots TP (February 2009). "Identification of Pseudomonas Aeruginosa by a Deplux Real-time Polymerase Chain Reaction Assay Targeting the ecfX and the gyrB Genes". Diagnostic Microbiology and Infectious Disease. 63 (2): 127–31. doi:10.1016/j.diagmicrobio.2008.09.018. PMID 19026507.

Wainwright CE, Grimwood K, Carlin JB, Vidmar S, Cooper PJ, Francis PW, Byrnes CA, Whitehead BF, Martin AJ, Robertson IF, Cooper DM, Dakin CJ, Masters IB, Massie RJ, Robinson PJ, Ranganathan S, Armstrong DS, Patterson LK, Robertson CF (October 2008). "Safety of Bronchoalveolar Lavage in Young Children with Cystic Fibrosis". Pediatric Pulmonology. 43 (10): 965–72. doi:10.1002/ppul.20885. hdl:2292/35412. PMID 18780333. S2CID 23961887.

Thomas CL, O'Rourke PK, Wainwright CE (February 2008). "Clinical Outcomes of Queensland Children with Cystic Fibrosis: a Comparison Between Tertiary Centre and Outreach Services". Medical Journal of Australia. 188 (3): 135–9. doi:10.5694/j.1326-5377.2008.tb01554.x. PMID 18241167. S2CID 17498936.

McMorran BJ, Patat SA, Carlin JB, Grimwood K, Jones A, Armstrong DS, Galati JC, Cooper PJ, Byrnes CA, Francis PW, Roberston CF, Hume DA, Borchers CH, Wainwright CE, Wainwright BJ (October 2007). "Novel Neutrophil-derived Proteins in Bronchoalveolar Lavage Fluid Indicate and Exaggerated Inflammatory Response in Pediatric Cystic Fibrosis Patients". Clinical Chemistry. 53 (10): 1782–91. doi:10.1373/clinchem.2007.087650. PMID 17702859.

Hennig S, Waterhouse TH, Bell SC, France M, Wainwright CE, Miller H, Charles BG, Duffull SB (April 2007). "A d-optimal Designed Population Pharmacokinetic Study of Oral Itraconazole in Adult Cystic Fibrosis Patients". Journal of Clinical Pharmacology. 63 (4): 438–50. doi:10.1111/j.1365-2125.2006.02778.x. PMC 2203246. PMID 17073891.

Hennig S, Wainwright CE, Bell SC, Miller H, Friberg LE, Charles BG (2006). "Population Pharmacokinetics of Itraconazole and its Active Metabolite Hydroxy-itraconazole in Paediatric Cystic Fibrosis and Bone Marrow Transplant Patients". Clinical Pharmacokinetics. 45 (11): 1099–114. doi:10.2165/00003088-200645110-00004. PMID 17048974. S2CID 40302037.

Murphy AJ, Buntain HM, Wainwright CE, Davies PS (February 2006). "The Nutritional Status of Children with Cystic Fibrosis" (PDF). Journal of Nutrition. 95 (2): 321–4. doi:10.1079/bjn20051611. PMID 16469148. S2CID 21878800.

Buntain HM, Schluter PJ, Bell SC, Greer RM, Wong JC, Batch J, Lewindon P, Wainwright CE (February 2006). "Controlled Longitudinal Study of Bone Mass Accrual in Children and Adolescents with Cystic Fibrosis". Thorax. 61 (2): 146–54. doi:10.1136/thx.2005.046516. PMC 2104575. PMID 16384878.

Chandan SS, Faoagali J, Wainwright CE (August 2005). "Sensitivity of Respiratory Bacteria to Lignocaine". Pathology. 37 (4): 305–7. doi:10.1080/00313020500168752. PMID 16194830. S2CID 5973638.

Buntain HM, Greer RM, Wong JC, Schluter PJ, Batch J, Lewindon P, Bell SC, Wainwright CE (July 2005). "Pubertal Development and its Influences on Bone Mineral Density in Australian Children and Adolescents with Cystic Fibrosis". Journal of Paediatrics and Child Health. 41 (7): 317–22. doi:10.1111/j.1440-1754.2005.00635.x. PMID 16014134. S2CID 35191062.

Syrmis MW, O'Carroll MR, Sloots TP, Coulter C, Wainwright CE, Bell SC, Nissen MD (November 2004). "Rapid Genotyping of Pseudomonas Aeruginosa Isolates Harboured by Adult and Paediatric Patients with Cystic Fibrosis Using Repetitive-element-based PCR Assays". Journal of Medical Microbiology. 53 (11): 1089–96. doi:10.1099/jmm.0.45611-0. PMID 15496385.

Greer RM, Buntain HM, Lewindon PJ, Wainwright CE, Potter JM, Wong JC, Francis PW, Batch JA, Bell SC (August 2004). "Vitamin A Levels in Patients with CF are Influenced by the Inflammatory Response". Journal of Cystic Fibrosis. 3 (3): 143–9. doi:10.1016/j.jcf.2004.04.003. PMID 15463900.

O'Carroll MR, Syrmis MW, Wainwright CE, Greer RM, Mitchell P, Coulter C, Sloots TP, Nissen MD, Bell SC (July 2004). "Clonal Strains of Pseudomonas Aeruginosa in Paediatric and Adult Cystic Fibrosis Units". European Respiratory Journal. 24 (1): 101–6. doi:10.1183/09031936.04.00122903. PMID 15293611.

Murphy AJ, Buntain HM, Wong JC, Greer RM, Wainwright CE, Davies PS (July 2004). "The Use of Air Displacement Plethysmography in Children and Adolescents with Cystic Fibrosis". European Journal of Clinical Nutrition. 58 (7): 985–9. doi:10.1038/sj.ejcn.1601919. PMID 15220939.

Buntain HM, Greer RM, Schluter PJ, Wong JC, Batch JA, Potter JM, Lewindon PJ, Powell E, Wainwright CE, Bell SC (February 2004). "Bone Mineral Density in Australian Children, Adolescents and Adults with Cystic Fibrosis: a Controlled Cross Sectional Study". Thorax. 59 (2): 149–55. doi:10.1136/thorax.2003.006726. PMC 1746947. PMID 14760157.

Greer RM, Buntain HM, Potter JM, Wainwright CE, Wong JC, O'Rourke PK, Francis PW, Bell SC, Batch JA (June 2003). "Abnormalities of the PTH-vitamin D Axis and Bone Turnover Markers in Children, Adolescents and Adults with Cystic Fibrosis: Comparison with Healthy Controls". Osteoporos. Int. 14 (5): 404–11. doi:10.1007/s00198-003-1388-1. PMID 12730764. S2CID 32939096.
