= Stuart Pegg =

Australian burns specialist (1932–2023)

Emeritus Professor Stuart Pegg AM
- Born: 13 March 1932
- Died: 2 April 2023 (aged 91); Brisbane, Queensland, Australia
- Education: University of Queensland
- Occupation: Doctor
- Years active: 1957–2006
- Known for: pioneering treatment for burns patients
- Notable work: Professor Stuart Pegg Adult Burns Centre at Royal Brisbane and Women's Hospital
- Website: https://www.stuartpegg.com/

Stuart Phillip Pegg AM (13 March 1932 – 2 April 2023) was an Australian burns specialist. He is credited with developing and providing life saving treatment for critically ill burns patients.

== Career ==
After graduating Brisbane Grammar School in 1950, Pegg studied at the University of Queensland. He graduated with a Bachelor of Medicine, Bachelor of Surgery with honours in 1956.

Pegg commenced his medical career by interring at the Royal Brisbane Hospital in 1957 before serving as the medical superintendent at Julia Creek from 1958 to 1961.

It was during his time at Julia Creek where he first became interested in the treatment of burns after encountering a severely-burnt house fire victim. Despite contacting some of the state's most senior specialists for advice, they couldn't offer Pegg any sufficient guidance. Although the patient died, the case prompted Pegg to advocate for better ways to treat burns.

From 1962 to 1964, he worked as the surgical registrar at the Princess Alexandra Hospital before spending time at the Royal Berkshire Hospital in England. Beginning in June 1967, Pegg started working at the Royal Brisbane Hospital initially as a surgical supervisor and then as the director of surgery.

In 1974, Pegg was awarded a Churchill Fellowship to visit burns centres across the world to research how to improve treatment of burns patients in Australia.

After lobbying for better facilities, an adult burns centre was established at the Royal Brisbane Hospital in 1977, of which he was appointed the director. It was relocated to another building in 2003, and reopened as the Professor Stuart Pegg Adult Burns Centre in his honour.

A burns unit at the Royal Children's Hospital was established in 1986 before it was transferred to the Lady Cilento Children's Hospital in 2014. In 2017, the unit was named the Pegg Leditschke Children's Burns Centre in recognition of Pegg and fellow burns surgeon Associate Professor Fred Leditscheke.

From 1990 to 1998, Pegg served as the vice-president of the International Society for Burn Injuries.

In 1994, he was recruited to become an associate professor of burn surgery at the University of Queensland. He was promoted to professor in 1996. Pegg became an emeritus professor at the University of Queensland in 2001 where he taught burns surgery methods to students over a five-year period.

In 2006, Pegg earned a Doctor of Medicine from the University of Queensland and retired the same year.

One of Pegg's most notable patients was Jandamarra O'Shane, a seven-year-old Aboriginal boy who was doused in petrol and set alight while playing at his Cairns primary school in 1996.

Speaking about Pegg in a 2017 interview, O'Shane stated: "He always had this presence when he walked in. It was always understood he was the guy who’s calling the shots and making everything happen for me. He’s a warrior in his own way, I’d like to say. Certain people have that quality about them. The feeling you’d get when he walked in through the doors most mornings, it was like: ‘Cool, I’m happy’. Things that he's done throughout his life, it's really had an effect on us, his patients. He was probably the perfect person for the job... I think about kids I was in hospital with. I wasn't the one who got burnt the worst. I saw others struggling worse than I was. That's really difficult. I just think about him being in the position that he had to work on those kids every day. Mentally, having to see that every day, I wouldn't be able to do it."

== Military ==
Pegg was as a captain in the United States Army Reserve in 1957. From 1981 to 1987, Pegg served as a major in the Australian Army Reserve.

== Recognition ==
In the 1996 Queen's Birthday Honours, Pegg was made a Member of the Order of Australia in recognition to his service to medicine, particularly as the vice-president of the International Burns Society and as director of the burns units at the Royal Brisbane and the Royal Children's Hospital.

In 2018, Pegg received the Vice-Chancellor's Alumni Excellence Award from the University of Queensland.

Pegg was named as a Queensland Great in 2022.

Pegg died on 2 April 2023, at the age of 91.
