= Margaret Cilento =

Australian artist (1923–2017)

- Cilento in 1951
- Born: Phyllis Margaret Cilento; 23 December 1923; Sydney, Australia
- Died: 21 November 2006 (aged 82); Melbourne, Australia
- Education: East Sydney Technical College
- Known for: Painting, printmaking
- Spouse: Geoff Maslen
- Parents: Raphael Cilento (father); Phyllis Cilento (mother)
- Relatives: Diane Cilento (sister); Jason Connery (nephew)

Phyllis Margaret Cilento (23 December 1923 – 21 November 2006) was an Australian painter and printmaker.

== Biography ==
Cilento was born in Sydney, Australia on 23 December 1923. She studied at East Sydney Technical College. In 1947, Cilento went to New York on a Travelling Scholarship. There she studied at the abstract expressionist Subjects of the Artist School. She also studied at the Atelier 17 printmaking studio, and at the Brooklyn Museum of Art.

In 1949, Cilento moved to Europe to study engraving at the École des Beaux-Arts, and to work at the reopened Paris branch of Atelier 17, returning to Australia in 1951. She moved to London in 1954, where she studied at the Central School of Art at Goldsmith’s College. In 1963, she married Australian journalist Geoff Maslen and the couple moved to Australia. Cilento died in Melbourne, Australia on 21 November 2006.

Cilento's work is in the collection of the National Gallery of Victoria and the National Gallery of Australia. Cilento was included in the 2007 exhibition Breaking New Ground: Brisbane Women Artists of the Mid-Twentieth Century held at the Queensland University of Technology. Also included in the show were Pamela MacFarlane, Margaret Olley, Joy Roggenkamp, Betty Quelhurst, and Kathleen Shillam.
