= Pinnaroo Cemetery and Crematorium, Brisbane =

Cemetery in Queensland, Australia

Coordinates: 27.3524°S 152.9933°E

The Pinnaroo Cemetery and Crematorium is a cemetery and crematorium located at Graham Road, Bridgeman Downs, Brisbane, Queensland, Australia. It is operated by the City of Brisbane.

== History ==
The cemetery opened in 1962 and the crematorium, chapel and function room opened in 2002.

== Burial and cremation options ==
Unlike many cemeteries in Brisbane, Pinnaroo is still open with new burial sites available. The cemetery offers lawn and lawn beam memorials, but not traditional headstones. Ashes can be placed in niches, or buried or scattered in gardens.

== Notable people ==
Notable people buried at Pinnaroo include:

- Peter Byrne, politician
- William Carter, politician
- Sir Raphael Cilento, Australian medical practitioner and public health administrator
- Lady Phyllis Cilento, Australian medical practitioner and journalist
- Charles English, politician
- Gregg Hansford, Australian touring car and motorcycle racer
- Roy Harvey, Mayor of Brisbane 1982–1985
- Don Lane, politician jailed for corruption
- George Lawson, politician
- Bruce Alexander McDonald, a Major General in the Australian army
- Bill Moore, politician
- Mick Nolan, Australian rules football player, 1975 Premiership-winner with North Melbourne
