= Raphael Cilento =

Australian medical practitioner and public health administrator

Sir Raphael Cilento
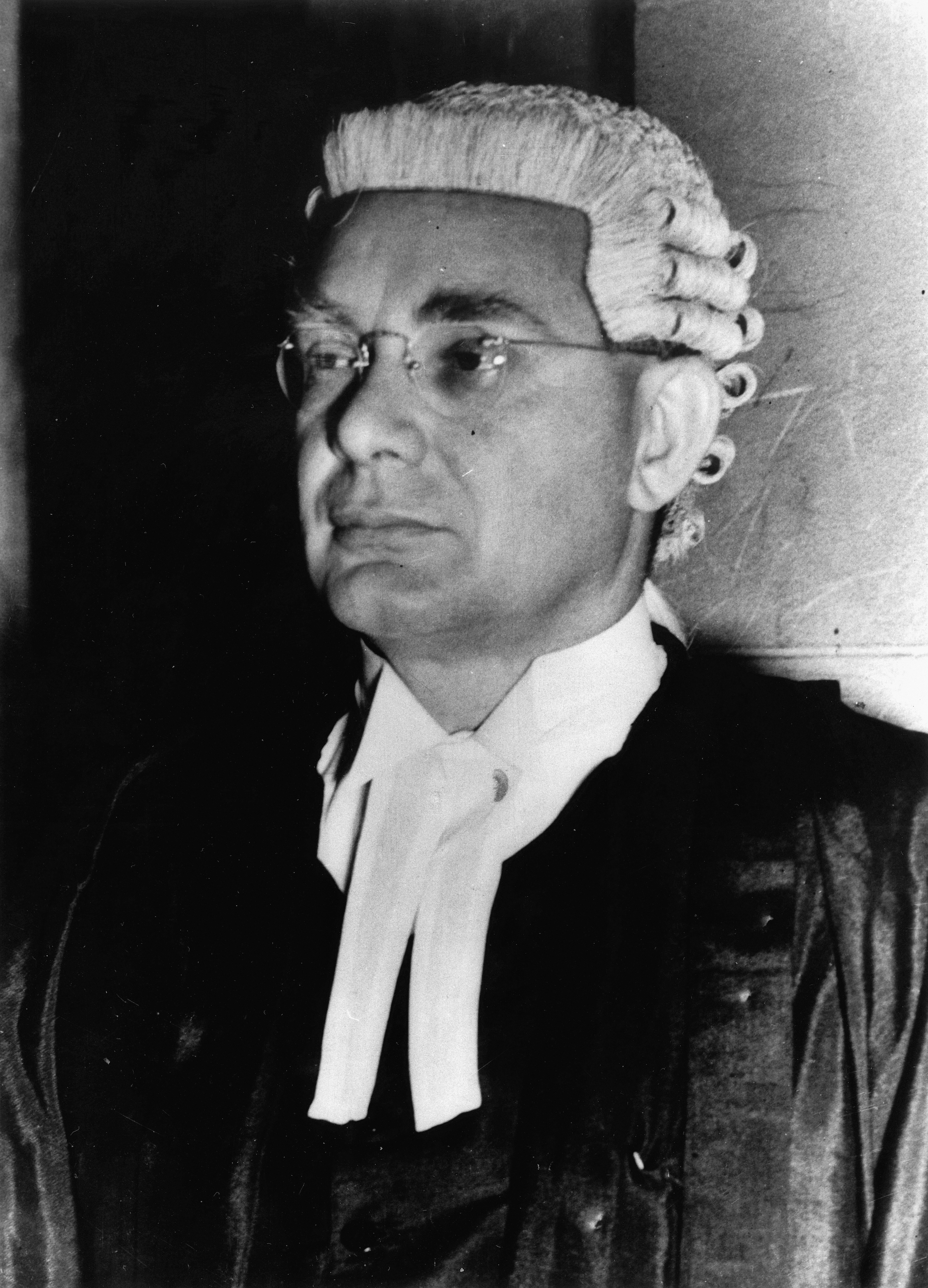
- Cilento wearing legal robes in 1941

Leader of the Independent Democratic Party
- In office 1953–1954
- Preceded by: Party established
- Succeeded by: Party dissolved
- Education: Teacher, medical practitioner
- Known for: Aiding Refugees Post World War II
- Spouse: Phyllis McGlew
- Children: 6, including Margaret and Diane
- Relatives: Jason Connery (grandson); Charles Thomas McGlew (father-in-law)
- Medical career
- Institutions: Australian Army's Tropical Force; Australian Institute of Tropical Medicine (1922-24); Commonwealth Government's Division of Tropical Hygiene (1928-34); Queensland Health Department; United Nations refugees and displaced Persons (1946-47); Australian League of Rights
- Sub-specialties: Administering Tropical Medicine
- Research: Public health – tropical medicine
- Awards: Knighted, 1935

Personal details
- Born: Raphael West Cilento; 2 December 1893 Jamestown, South Australia, Australia
- Died: 15 April 1985 (aged 91) Oxley, Queensland, Australia
- Profession: Medical practitioner

Sir Raphael West Cilento (2 December 1893 – 15 April 1985), often known as "Ray", was an Australian medical practitioner and public health administrator.

== Early life and education ==
Cilento was born in Jamestown, South Australia, in 1893, son of Raphael Ambrose Cilento, a stationmaster (whose father Salvatore had emigrated from Naples, Italy in 1855), and Frances Ellen Elizabeth (née West). His younger brother, Alan Watson West Cilento (b. 1908), became General Manager of the Savings Bank of South Australia from 1961 to 1968.

He was educated at Prince Alfred College, but although he was determined from an early age to study medicine, he was initially thwarted in doing so due to lack of money. Therefore, he trained first as a school teacher, sponsored by the Education Department, from 1908 and taught at Port Pirie in 1910 and 1911. He studied medicine at the University of Adelaide.

== Early career ==
For the earlier part of his working life, Cilento's interests were mainly in public health and, specifically, tropical medicine. He served with the Australian Army's Tropical Force in New Guinea which superseded the German administration after the First World War. Later he joined the British colonial service in Malaya.

On his return to Australia he was Director of the Australian Institute of Tropical Medicine in Townsville, Queensland, from 1922 to 1924.

== Middle career ==
Following a further term in New Guinea, Cilento became Director of the Commonwealth Government's Division of Tropical Hygiene in Brisbane. He held that role from 1928 to 1934.

In 1934, Queensland's Forgan Smith Government set out to create one of the world's first universally free public health systems. Minister for Health Ned Hanlon recruited Cilento to achieve this goal as Director-General of Health and Medical Services. Cilento, despite his subsequent identification with the political right wing, never lost his belief in government-funded health care. To assist in his policy-making objectives, he studied law and was admitted to the Bar in 1939.

As Director-General (a position he held till 1945), and combined with the presidency of the state's Medical Board (as well as with the medicine professorship at the University of Queensland), he firmly opposed the anti-polio methods of Elizabeth Kenny, although at first he had spoken politely enough of her work to give the impression that he favoured it.

Cilento was knighted by King George V in 1935 (when only 42 years old) for his contributions to public service and tropical medicine. He achieved international fame after World War II for his work in aiding refugees with the United Nations Relief and Rehabilitation Administration. In July 1945 he was the first civilian doctor to enter Belsen concentration camp, after doing considerable work on malaria control in The Balkans. He was Director for Refugees and Displaced Persons from 1946 to 1947.

In August 1948, as Director of the Division of Social Activities of the United Nations, Cilento toured the areas affected by the fighting in Palestine with Count Folke Bernadotte, the U.N. mediator. He viewed the Arab refugee problem as a disaster comparable to an earthquake, flood or tidal wave. He resigned in 1950 after expressing sympathy with dispossessed Palestinian refugees and surviving an assassination attempt by the Stern Gang. He returned to Australia in 1951.

== Later life ==
Cilento's later life in his native land was characterised by frustration at being unable to find appropriate employment in government service or academia. This failure was at least partly the consequence of his increasingly racist and ultra-conservative views, exemplified by his involvement with the Australian League of Rights during the 1950s and 1960s in particular, and his continued public support for the White Australia Policy long after this doctrine had ceased to be part of the Australian party-political mainstream. Professor Mark Finnane of Griffith University has written in the journal Queensland Review that "[m]uch of his brilliance, energetically applied to the development of sound research and policy in the control and eradication of tropical diseases, was directed also to applying the developing techniques of epidemiology and tropical medicine in the service of ideas about racial hierarchies which had a firm basis in the nineteenth century. These ideas eventually would be discredited by the history as well as science unfolding from the 1920s, but even so Cilento hung on to them well past their waning. Into the 1950s, 1960s and 1970s, he was still writing about the white man in the tropics and racial vitality in ways that ensured his reputation for good work in other domains would struggle to survive his own monomania."

In a letter in The Courier-Mail (18 May 1965) on Australian clergy's attitude to the Vietnam War he said 'I am not a practising Christian – I am sorry for it ... I regret that I have not the gift of faith'.

Cilento died on 15 April 1985 in the Brisbane suburb of Oxley and was survived by his wife and six children. Although he had been married in a Church of England service, he was brought up Catholic and was buried with Catholic rites at Pinnaroo Lawn Cemetery.

== Family ==
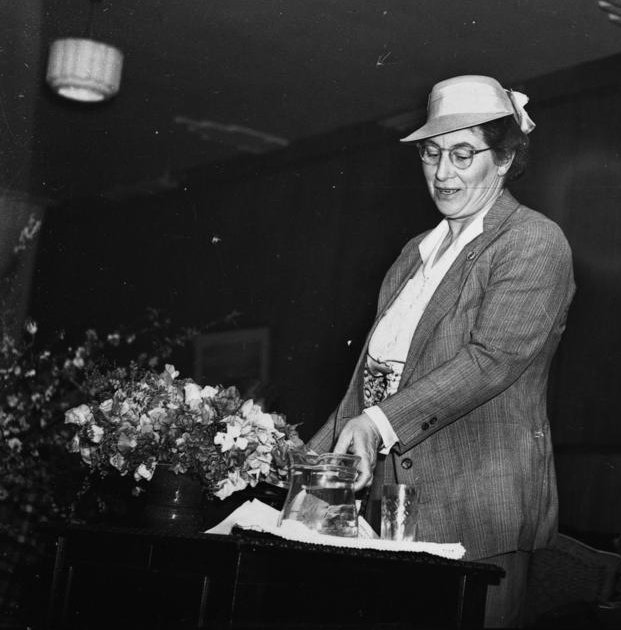
Cilento's wife Phyllis in 1943

In 1918, whilst they were both studying medicine at the University of Adelaide, Cilento became engaged to, and on 18 March 1920 at St Columba's Church of England, Hawthorn he married Phyllis McGlew, who also became a well-known medical practitioner and medical writer. They briefly set up in general practice in Tranmere before departing for Malaya in October.

Together they had three sons and three daughters. The three sons and Ruth became medical practitioners, Margaret became an artist, and Diane became an actress.

Raphael C. F. Cilento (19 February 1921 – 21 May 2012) became a neurosurgeon. He married Billie Solomon in 1947, and had four children: Adrienne, Julien, Vivienne and Raphael. He took over his mother's practice in Brisbane in 1949. In 1953, he had a son Vivian Walker (later Kabul Oodgeroo Noonuccal) with Kath Walker (later Oodgeroo Noonuccal), who was working for his parents as a domestic servant. He later divorced Billie and married Mavis Ross in 1958. They had five children: Penny, Giovanna, Abby, Naomi and Benjamin. His youngest son, Benjamin West Cilento, also became a physician who lived in the Houston, Texas area with his wife and three children. He is also an accomplished artist in his own right. From 1963–2007, Raphael was licensed to practise in New York. He had a fall in his early 80s that incapacitated him and he died of pneumonia at the age of 91.

Margaret Cilento (23 December 1923 – 21 November 2006) became a painter and printmaker. She grew up in Brisbane, moved to Sydney in 1943, and joined her father in New York in 1945. She spent most of the 1950s and early 1960s in Europe, marrying Geoffrey Maslen in 1963, and returned to Brisbane in 1965 to raise their family. She took up art again seriously around 2000, holding several exhibitions.

Ruth A Yolanda Cilento (30 July 1925 – 18 April 2016) graduated in medicine and surgery from Queensland University in 1949. She took up duty at Cairns Base Hospital in December 1949, and married Westall David Smout in 1950. In addition to a medical career, she had three children, is a sculptor, a sketcher, has an angora goat stud and wrote a children's book, Moreton Bay Adventure in 1961, which elder sister Margaret illustrated.

Carl Lindsay Cilento (1928-2004) married Diana Lauderdale Maitland in 1952. They had six children: Peter (1953), Miranda (1955), Joanne and Belinda (1957), Richard (1961) and Madeline (1966).

Elizabeth Diane Cilento (2 April 1932 – 6 October 2011) was born in Brisbane. She was an actress who married three times, secondly to Sean Connery, and was the mother of actor Jason Connery.

David Cilento (21 February 1936 – 8 November 2020)

== Other interests ==
- He twice attempted to enter parliament, once as a Democratic Party candidate for the Senate in the 1953 election, and as an Independent Democrat for the House of Representatives seat of McPherson in 1954.
- He was a member of the Royal Historical Society of Queensland and its president in 1933–34, 1943–45 and 1953–68.
- He was member of the National Trust of Queensland and president from 1966 to 1971.

== Publications ==
Sir Raphael Cilento's publications include:

- Cilento, Raphael (1920) Climatic conditions in North Queensland : as they affect the health and virility of the people Brisbane : A.J. Cumming, Government Printer
- Cilento, Raphael (1925a) Preventive medicine and hygiene in the tropical territories under Australian control Australasian Association for the Advancement of Science. Wellington : Govt. Printer
- Cilento, Raphael (1925b) The white man in the tropics : with especial reference to Australia and its dependencies Service publication (Australia. Division of Tropical Hygiene); no.7. Melbourne : H.J. Green, Govt. Printer
- Cilento, Raphael (1936) Nutrition and numbers Livingstone lectures. Sydney : Camden College
- Cilento, Raphael (1944a) Blueprint for the health of a nation Sydney : Scotow Press
- Cilento, Raphael (1944b) Tropical diseases in Australasia: a handbook . Brisbane : W.R. Smith & Paterson. (2nd Edition)
- Cilento, Raphael & Lack, Clem (1959) "Wild white men" in Queensland : a monograph. Brisbane : W.R. Smith & Paterson for the Royal Historical Society of Queensland
- Cilento, Raphae & Lack, Clem. & Centenary Celebrations Council (Qld.) (Historical Committee) (1959), Triumph in the tropics : an historical sketch of Queensland / compiled and edited by Sir Raphael Cilento; with the assistance of Clem Lack; for the Historical Committee of the Centenary Celebrations Council of Queensland Smith & Paterson, Brisbane, Qld.
- Cilento, Raphael (1963) Medicine in Queensland : a monograph Council of the Royal Historical Society of Queensland. Brisbane : Smith & Paterson.
- Cilento, Raphael (1972) Australia's racial heritage : an address Australian League of Rights Seminar, Melbourne, September 1971. Adelaide : Australian Heritage Society,

== Sources ==
- Fisher, Fedora (1994), Raphael Cilento, A Biography, University of Queensland Press, ISBN 0-7022-2438-3
- Martyr, Philippa J. (2002), Paradise of Quacks: An Alternative History of Medicine in Australia, Macleay Press, Sydney, ISBN 1-876492-06-6
