= Royal Children's Hospital, Brisbane =

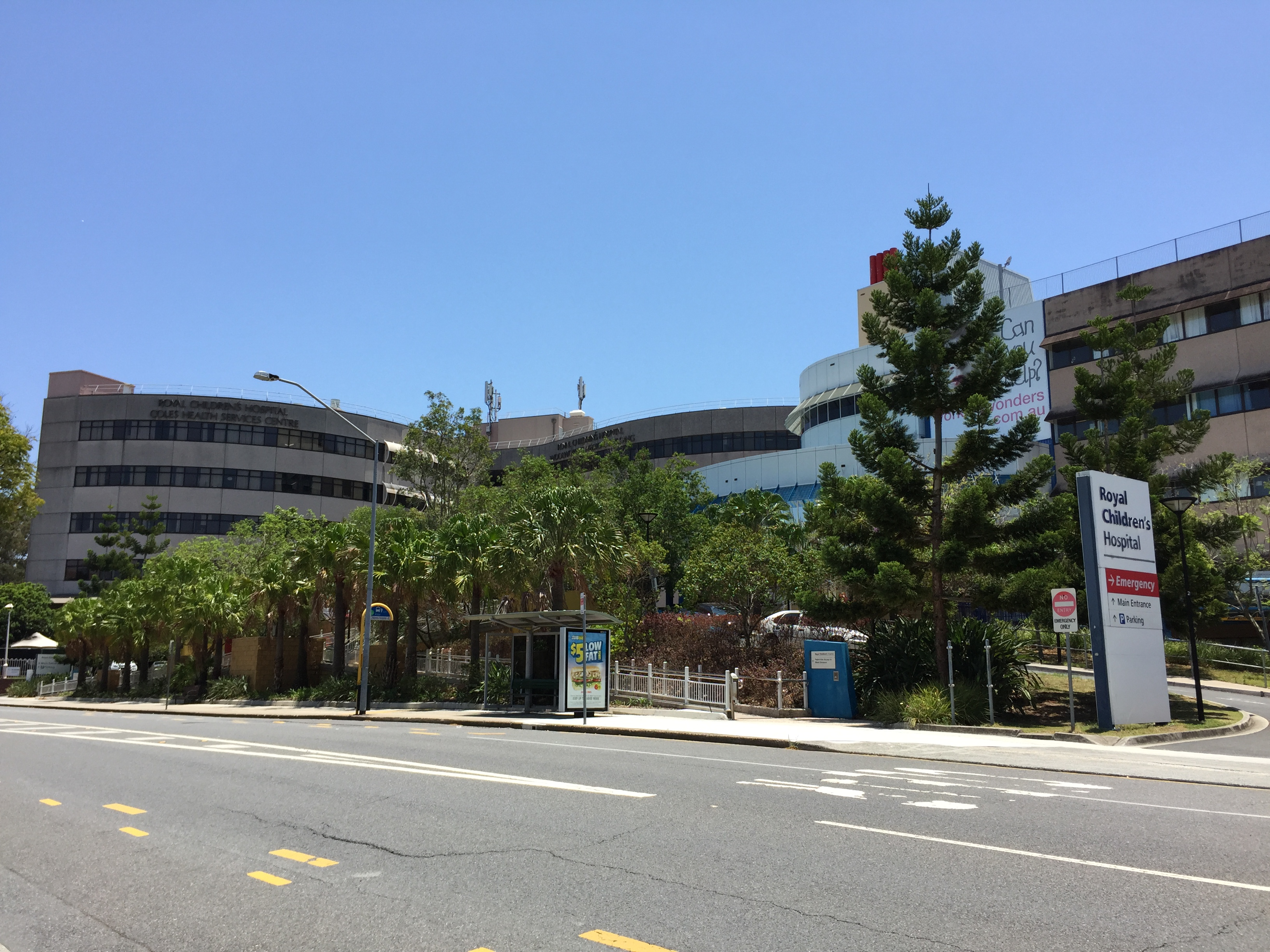
- Royal Children's Hospital, Herston, November 2014

Geography
- Location: Herston, Brisbane, Queensland, Queensland, Australia
- Coordinates: 27.4492°S 153.0255°E

Organisation
- Care system: Public
- Type: Specialist

Services
- Speciality: Paediatrics

History
- Opened: 1878
- Closed: 2014
- Demolished: 2017

Links
- Lists: Hospitals in Australia

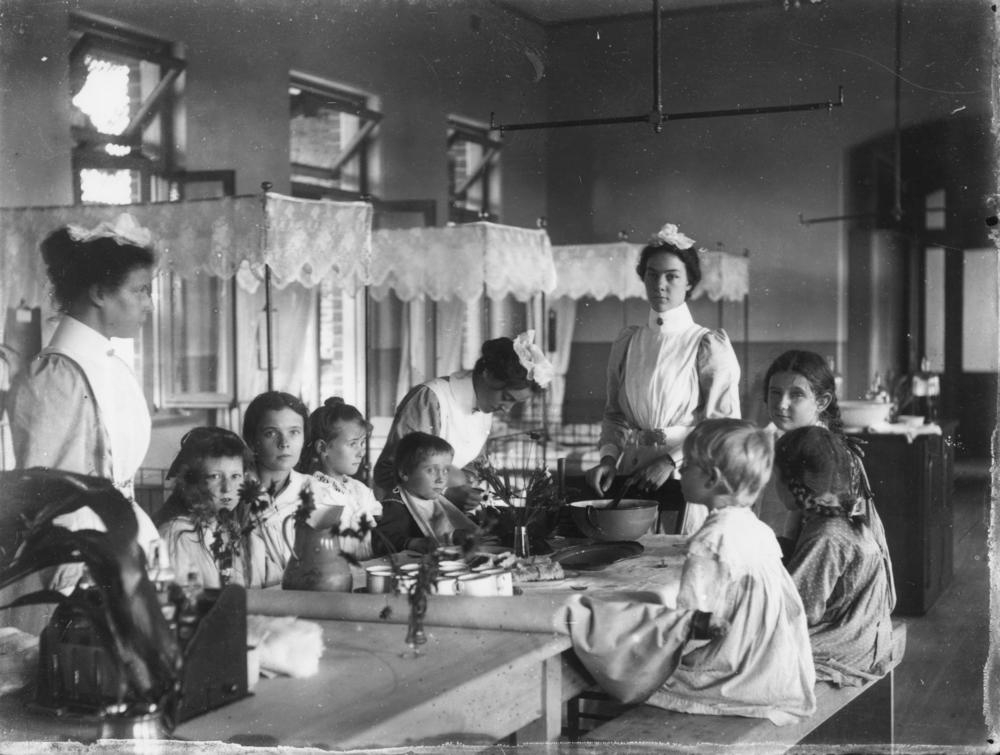
Tea time at the hospital, 1890-1900

The Royal Children's Hospital (RCH) was a hospital for children in Herston, Brisbane, Australia. RCH was located next to the Royal Brisbane and Women's Hospital before it was demolished.

== History ==
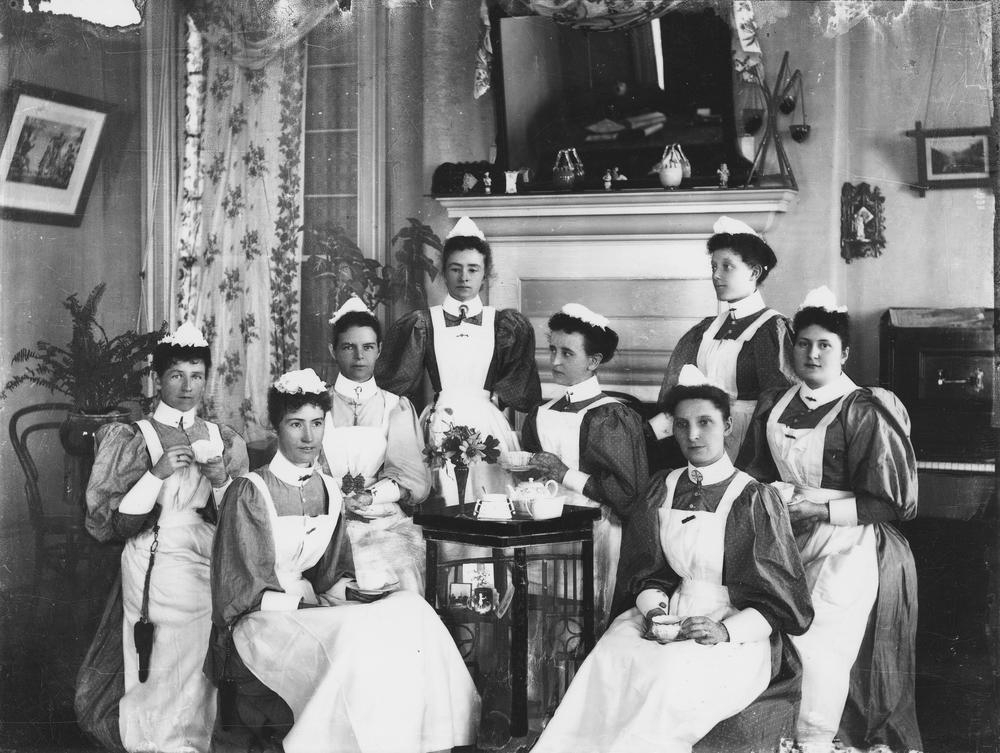
Nursing staff, circa 1899

Mary McConnel, a mother of six and grandmother, grew concerned at the lack of primary care for children in Brisbane. Inspired by the Royal Hospital for Sick Children in her home town of Edinburgh and London's Great Ormond Street Hospital, she endeavoured over fifteen years to raise money to found a children's hospital in the Brisbane.

On 11 March 1878, the Hospital for Sick Children opened in rented premises in Leichhardt Street Spring Hill, on the site of the present St Paul's Presbyterian Church. McConnel hired a nurse and matron from England to run the hospital, while local women were trained. The hospital quickly outgrew its 15-bed premises, and was moved to a larger building in Herston on land provided by the Queensland Government.

The hospital's name was changed from the Hospital for Sick Children to the Brisbane Children's Hospital on 21 October 1943. Its name was changed again in 1967 to Royal Children's Hospital.

In 2009, a decision was made to merge the Royal Children's Hospital with Mater Children's Hospital in Stanley Street, South Brisbane to create a single children's hospital in Brisbane. The decision was very controversial with many people opposed to the merger, while others supported the merge but argued over location of the new hospital (some favouring the Herston site and other favouring the South Brisbane site).

The Queensland Children's Hospital opened on 29 November 2014, adjacent to the Mater Misericordiae Hospital, in South Brisbane, with the Royal Children's Hospital and the Mater Children's Hospital closing immediately as their patients were transferred to the Queensland Children's Hospital.

In November 2016, the Queensland State Government announced the creation of the Herston Quarter Priority Development Area to restore and redevelop the hospital site. The hospital was demolished in 2017. The land was used to build the Surgical, Treatment and Rehabilitation Service (STARS).

== Notable personnel ==
- Phyllis Cilento, women and children's health advocate
- Michael Gabbett, clinical geneticist and academic
- John Pearn, esteemed professor of paediatrics and former Surgeon General of the Australian Defense Force
- Stuart Pegg, pioneering burns surgeon
- Claire Wainwright, a lead of the Cystic Fibrosis Service and a Senior Lecturer
