= Charles Thomas McGlew =

Australian merchant and exporter (1870/1871–1931)

Charles Thomas McGlew (1870/1871 – 28 December 1931), a South Australian merchant and exporter, was the first to export barley from Australia.

== Origins ==
Born at Redfern, Sydney, in 1870 or 1871 (he was 46, as of 30 October 1917, per WWI records), he was a son of Cornelius Stanley McGlew (1839–1924), an English-born mining surveyor and inventor who discovered minerals in N.S.W. and Queensland, particularly tin deposits, and whose name is perpetuated in McGlew Street, Stanthorpe, Queensland.

== Standard Salt Company ==
As a youth he was apprenticed as a shipbroker for the Orient Steam Navigation Company. He moved to South Australia in 1900 and commenced trading as a merchant and exporter. McGlew was a pioneer in the salt industry in South Australia, having established in 1903 the Standard Salt Company which from 1912 operated a busy refinery at Edithburgh, exporting to Russia among other places. In 1911, he purchased the rights to salt deposits at Esperance, W.A., establishing operations there also. This company was amalgamated with the Australian Salt Company in 1930.

== War Service, 1916-20 ==
In 1912, because of his export links, he was appointed Russian Consul for South Australia. In 1916, during World War I, at the age of 46 and despite having lucrative business interests, McGlew enlisted in the A.I.F. and was sent abroad as a second lieutenant with reinforcements of the 27th Battalion.

He claimed that by volunteering his example secured 300 to 400 Russian recruits to the A.I.F. In France, a short term of service with the transport details of the battalion was terminated by exposure to gas and the rigors of the French winter, from which he never properly recovered. His services were retained in munitions and arsenal base depots of England and the Australian Commonwealth repatriation office in London after the cessation of hostilities, and he was promoted to the rank of captain before returning to Australia in 1920.

== Grain and Wool Merchant ==
Returning from the war, McGlew expanded his commercial interests as a grain merchant, wool broker, and stock agent, opening branches in Melbourne, Perth, Brisbane, and London. A new company, McGlew & Co. Limited, was incorporated at Adelaide on 16 February 1924, he being the chairman. In the mid-1920s barley growers on Yorke Peninsula became dissatisfied with the service provided by grain traders, especially the Adelaide Steamship Company. To compel change they formed two trading companies of their own and then sought McGlew's assistance to use a cooperative similar to the wheat pools of Canada and the Cooperative Wheat Pool of Western Australia. Together with the barley growers, in 1925 McGlew purchased and imported the 722-ton steamship Broadway. McGlew used this ship to export the growers’ barley, for which he became known as the first person to export barley from Australia. Although uneconomical to continue beyond one season, this bold action was sufficient to bring about the market reforms desired by growers.

== Liberty Motor Oil Company ==
Based on his experiences with motorised transport on the Western Front, in the late 1920s, McGlew's company were Australian agents for the Atlantic Union Oil Company, leading to his establishment of the Liberty Motor Oil brand in 1930, with head office at 15 Waymouth Street, Adelaide. With great promise, the company advertised “Liberty oils for every use: Liberty Motor Oils, Liberty Agricultural Oils, Liberty Tractor Oils, Liberty Industrial Oils, Liberty Diesel Oils. Liberty Greases for every purpose.”

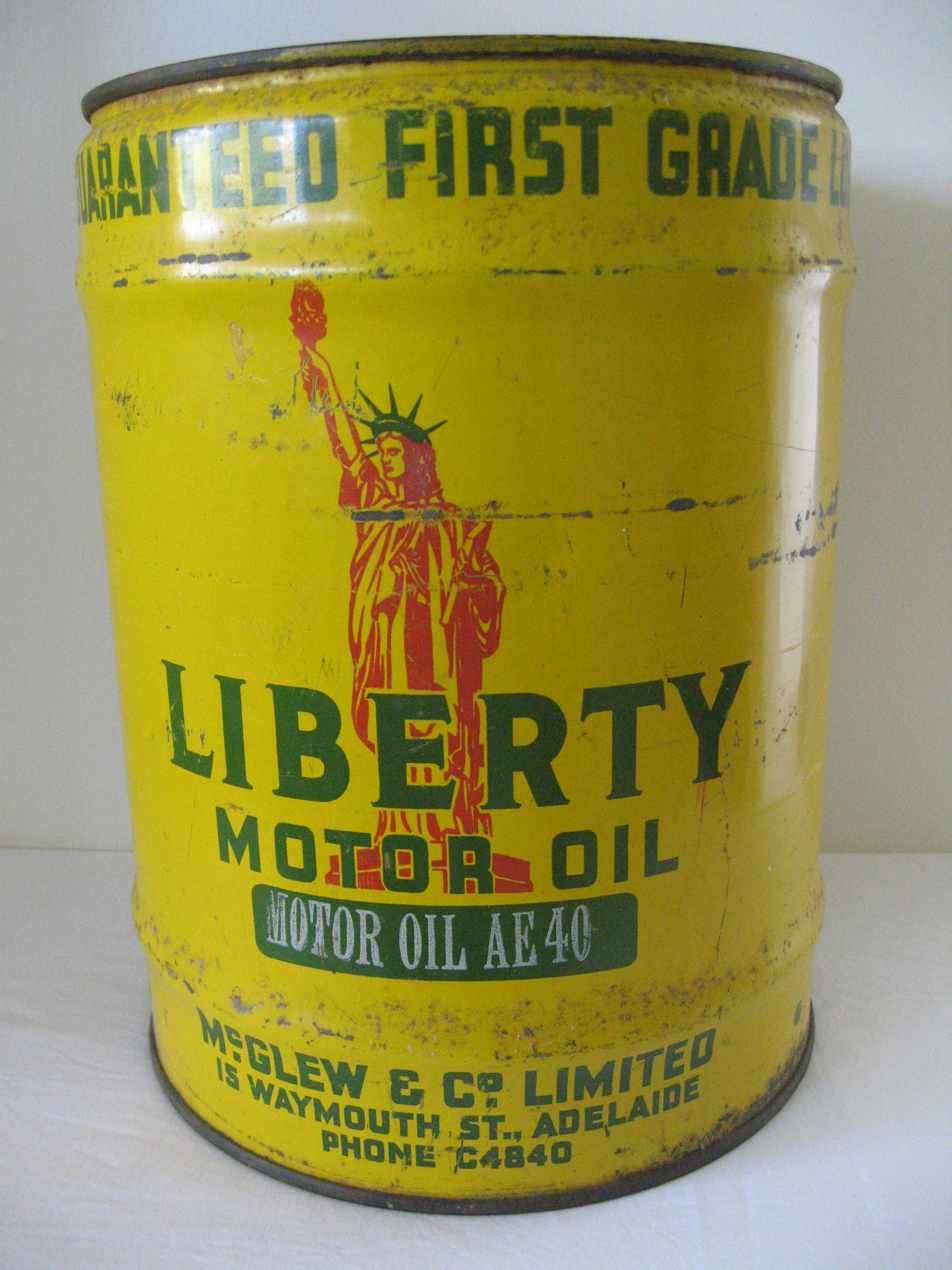
LIBERTY brand motor oil can, 4 gallon (20 litre), vintage c. 1931, McGlew & Co Ltd, Adelaide S.A.

However, by now McGlew was suffering much illness from the effects of gassing in the war and the Liberty Motor Oil Company collapsed soon after his death at North Adelaide on 28 December 1931. He was interred at West Terrace Cemetery. Oil stocks on hand were remaindered, mainly to Riverland motor dealers. His estate was valued for probate at £7,656.

== Family ==
McGlew married Alice Walker, of Sydney, who survived him. Estranged in later life, they divorced in 1929. Their daughter was the prominent medical practitioner and journalist Dr. Phyllis Cilento, mother of actress and author Diane Cilento, who married actor Sean Connery, with whom she had a son, actor Jason Connery.
