= Phyllis Cilento =

Australian doctor and medical journalist (1894–1987)

Phyllis Cilento Lady Cilento
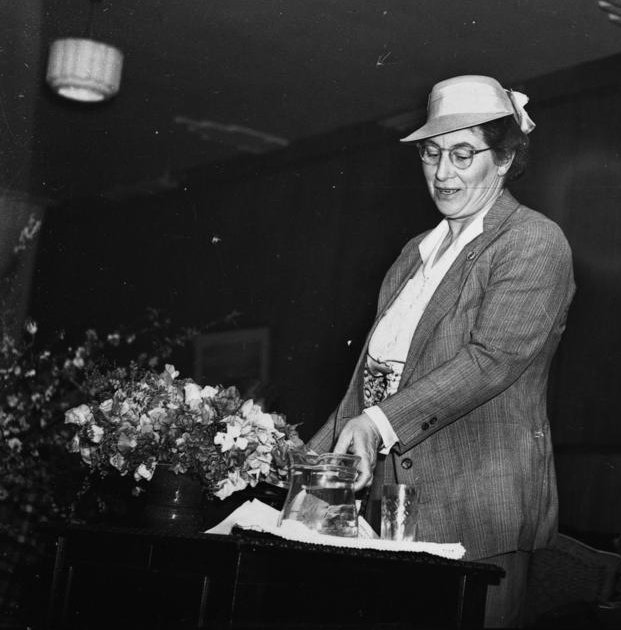
- Cilento in 1943
- Born: Phyllis Dorothy McGlew; 13 March 1894; Rockdale, New South Wales, Australia
- Died: 26 July 1987 (aged 93); Brisbane, Queensland, Australia
- Known for: Journalism and advocacy of health of mothers and children
- Spouse: Raphael Cilento
- Children: 6, including Margaret and Diane
- Father: Charles Thomas McGlew
- Relatives: Jason Connery (grandson)
- Medical career
- Profession: Medical practitioner
- Sub-specialties: Health of mothers and children

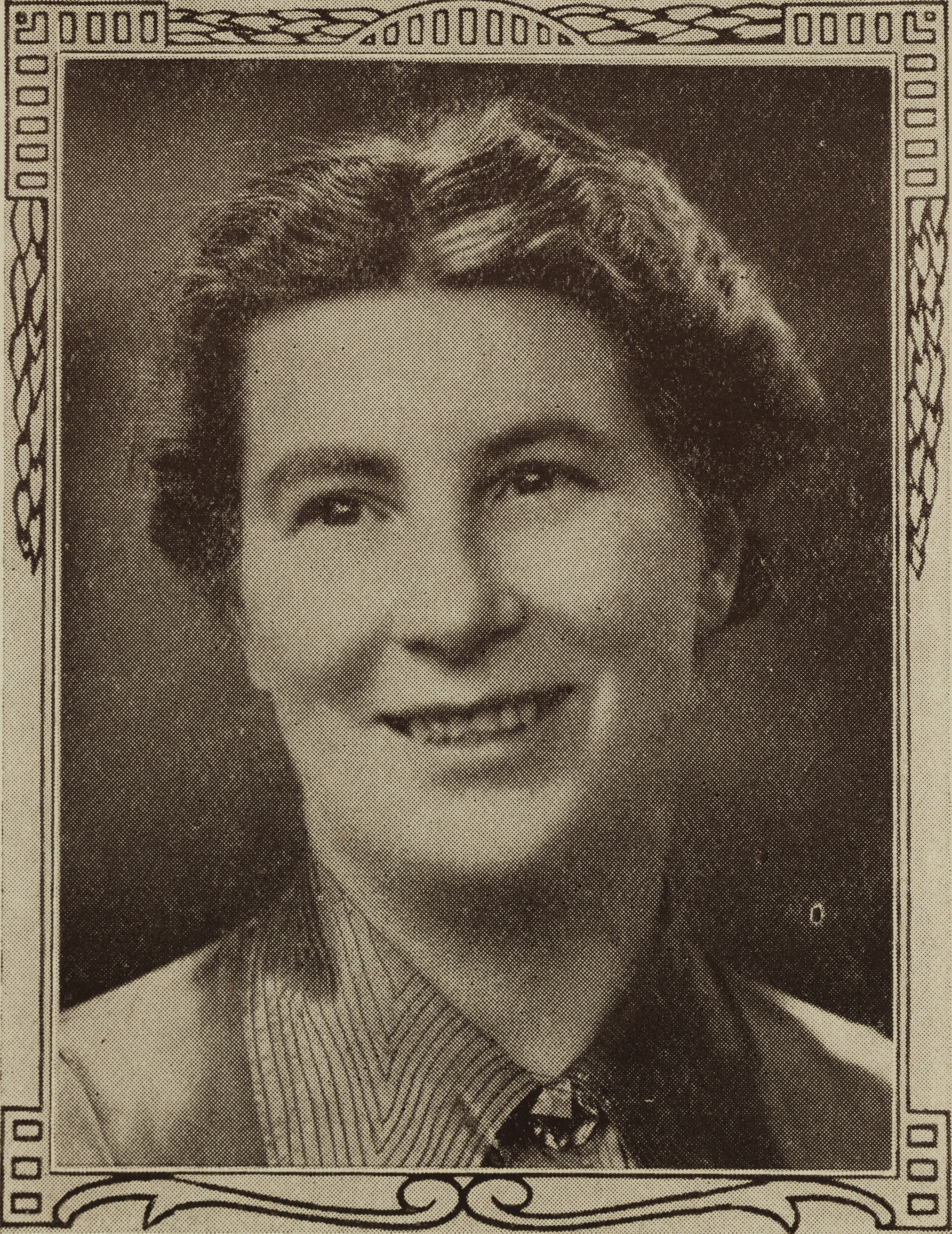
Portrait of Cilento, 1939

Phyllis Dorothy Cilento, Lady Cilento (née McGlew; 13 March 1894 – 26 July 1987) was an Australian medical practitioner, prominent medical journalist, and pioneering advocate of family planning in Queensland.

In August 2018, about 900 staff at Lady Cilento Children's Hospital in Brisbane, Queensland called for the hospital to change its name.

== Personal life ==
Cilento was born Phyllis Dorothy McGlew on 13 March 1894 in Rockdale, Sydney. She was the daughter of merchant and exporter Charles Thomas McGlew and Alice Lane (née Walker). She grew up in Adelaide, South Australia, and was educated at Tormore House School.

In 1920, she married Raphael Cilento, a medical doctor, medical administrator, and tropical medicine specialist. They worked in a number of countries before settling in Brisbane, Queensland, in 1928. He was knighted in 1935 whilst holding the position of Director-General of Health and Medical Services.

The Cilentos had six children, including artist Margaret Cilento and actress Diane Cilento, and remained married until Raphael's death in 1985. Phyllis died on 26 July 1987 in Brisbane and was buried in Pinnaroo Lawn Cemetery.

== Career ==
=== Medical practice ===
Cilento studied medicine at the University of Adelaide, graduating in 1919. She was the only woman in her graduating class. She worked for a short time at the Adelaide Hospital, the Hospital for Sick Children, Great Ormond Street, London and the Marylebone Medical Mission Dispensary.

Following her marriage, the couple moved to the Malay States where she worked as a "lady medical officer" in the British colonial service and supervised a women's ward in a hospital.

In 1922, Cilento studied a course in public health at the University of Sydney.

From 1924 to 1927, she worked in private practice in New Guinea.

Cilento worked in the Hospital for Sick Children in Brisbane from 1931 to 1938, after which she moved into general practice working from a surgery attached to her home in Annerley with a special interest in the health of mothers and children, including obstetrics. In 1967, she moved to Toowong, where she continued her practice until the early 1980s.

=== Journalism ===
Cilento became well known through her active advocacy of health issues for women and children. From 1928 onwards she wrote both occasional articles and regular columns for magazines and newspapers under the nom de plume of "Mother M.D." and "Medical Mother". She was particularly interested in promoting good nutrition and raising children. She expanded her outreach through books and radio, and was widely respected by women for her practical advice. She was a strong advocate of the benefit of vitamins. However, some of her advice was criticised by the medical community as she advocated for natural childbirth, contraception, the legalisation of abortion, and that fathers be present at the birth of their children.

=== Investigation of vitamin E ===
Dr. Cilento had used alpha-tocopherol (vitamin E) to soften scar tissue in her patients, noting that vitamin E restored circulation to dead-looking toes. Concerned over the increasing death rate from coronary blockages, she surveyed the scientific literature on vitamin E, including studies showing its benefits in preventing blood clots. In the early 1970s, Cilento decided to travel the world to investigate vitamin E therapy. Her travels took her to Singapore, Germany, Britain and North America, where she interviewed doctors and veterinarians who used vitamin E in large doses. Taking detailed and voluminous notes, she published her findings in a three-part series in Woman's Day, an Australian woman's magazine, in November 1973 (starting 12 Nov.). "I am convinced that the claims made for alpha-tocopherol are fully justified", she concluded. She went on to detail 17 ways vitamin E works in the body – among them, its action in dilating capillaries, protecting the membrane envelopes of red blood cells, and regulating blood platelets.

Observing that the Heart Foundation of Australia had refused to investigate the role of vitamin E in cardiovascular disease, Cilento wrote: "I am reminded of the many other occasions when life-saving innovations were delayed for years by the irrational conservatism of the medical Establishment… I myself was ridiculed and dismissed as a crank by a distinguished medical teacher when in 1919 I advocated vitamin D for cases of severe rickets. I was laughed at even though, at that time, the vitamin was curing starving babies in war-torn Vienna of this deforming disease. "...Once vitamin E jumps the barriers of prejudice, it may well be instrumental in saving the lives and sparing the suffering of many thousands...who will otherwise die." She expanded her findings into a book, The Versatile Vitamin: Vitamin E (1976). At the age of 82, Cilento continued writing a health column for The Courier-Mail.

=== Professional and community organisations ===
Dr Cilento was also active in medical organisations, including the inaugural president of the Queensland Medical Women's Society in 1929. She pursued her particular passion for mothers and children through the establishment in 1931 of the Mothercraft Association of Queensland in 1931, the Family Planning Association of Queensland, and her membership of Creche and Kindergarten Association of Queensland.

She was also active in women's organisations, including the National Council of Women of Queensland, the Business and Professional Women's Association and the Lyceum Club.

== Public recognition ==
- 1971: Presentation by the Brisbane City Mission with a citation signed by the Queensland Premier
- 1974: Queensland Mother of the Year
- 1977: Nutritional Foods Association of Australia inaugurated an award in her honour
- 1977: Lady Cilento Parenting Centre in Brisbane opened
- 1979: elected Fellow of the International Academy of Preventive Medicine
- 1980: awarded life membership of the Australian Medical Association.
- 1981: named Queenslander of the Year.
- 1982: named Loyal Australian of the Year by the Assembly of Captive European Nations.
- 1987: named Queensland Senior Citizen of the Year
- 1987: awarded a medal of merit by the Australian chapter of the Legion of Frontiersmen of the Commonwealth.
- 2013: Lady Cilento Children's Hospital was named in Cilento's honour.
  - In 2018, it was renamed to Queensland Children's Hospital after a hospital staff petition. Hospital staff cited Cilento's racist and homophobic writings, and lack of peer review for her writings. Queensland Minister for Health Steven Miles said that the change was because the public were confused about whether the hospital was a public or a private hospital, and this confusion could steer away potential patients and negatively impact research funding.

Cilento is the subject of a number of portraits; one by John Rigby (1973) is held in the Queensland Art Gallery.

== Controversies and legacy ==
Cilento opposed people of colour in the medical profession, saying, "it would not be in the best interests of children ... to be cared for by coloured labour" and "practically all Asiatic and Melanesian races are walking reservoirs of tropical diseases". She was also known to be fiercely intolerant of homosexuality, stating homosexuals were part of a "cult" and a "malignant tumour" on society. For these reasons, about 900 staff at Lady Cilento Children's Hospital signed a petition for the hospital to be renamed.

== Publications ==
- Square Meals for the Family (1933)
- The Emergency Care of Children (1940)
- A Code for Teenagers and Their Parents (1963)
- Enjoy Your Family: a Guide to Parenthood (1964)
- Plan Your Family : Practical Birth Control (1965)
- Mothercraft in Queensland : A Story of Progress and Achievement (1967)
- Vitamins and You (1971)
- All About the Pill (1971)
- All About Drugs (1972)
- Care For Your Eyes (1972)
- The Versatile Vitamin: Vitamin E (1976)
- You Don't Have to Live with Vitamin and Mineral Deficiencies (1977)
- We Are What We Eat (1977)
- You Don't Have to Live with Chronic Ill Health (1977)
- You Don't Have to Live with Ailing Heart and Blood Vessels (1977)
- You Can't Live without Vitamin C (1979)
- Medical Mother (1982)
- The Cilento Way (1984)
- Lady Cilento M.B. B.S.: My Life (autobiography) (1987)
