= Diane Cilento =

Australian actress (1932–2011)

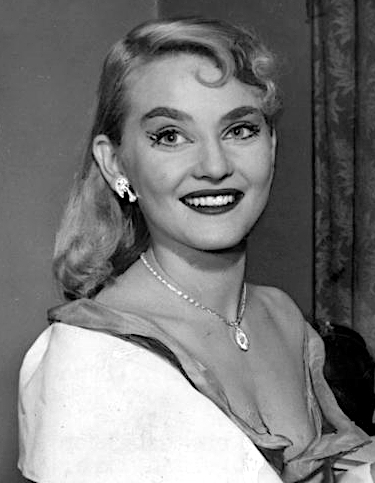
- Cilento in 1954
- Born: Elizabeth Diane Cilento; 2 April 1932; Brisbane, Queensland, Australia
- Died: 6 October 2011 (aged 79); Cairns, Queensland, Australia
- Occupation: Actress
- Years active: 1950–2011
- Spouses: Andrea Volpe (m. 1955; div. 1962); Sean Connery (m. 1962; div. 1973); Anthony Shaffer (m. 1985; died 2001)
- Children: 2, including Jason Connery
- Parents: Sir Raphael Cilento (father); Phyllis Cilento (mother)
- Relatives: Margaret Cilento (sister); Charles Thomas McGlew (maternal grandfather)

Elizabeth Diane Cilento (2 April 1932 – 6 October 2011) was an Australian actress. She is best known for her film roles in Tom Jones (1963), which earned her an Academy Award nomination, Hombre (1967) and The Wicker Man (1973). She also received a Tony Award nomination for her performance as Helen of Troy in the play Tiger at the Gates.

== Early life ==
Cilento was born on 2 April 1932 in Brisbane, Queensland, the daughter of Phyllis (née McGlew) and Raphael Cilento, both medical practitioners in Queensland. She was the fifth of six children; four of her siblings became medical practitioners, while her sister Margaret was an artist. Cilento's paternal great-grandfather, Salvatore Cilento, arrived from Naples, Italy, in 1855.

It was from a young age that Cilento decided to follow a career as an actress. After being expelled from school in Australia, she was schooled in New York while living with her father. Cilento later won a scholarship to the Royal Academy of Dramatic Art and moved to Britain in the early 1950s.

== Career ==
After graduation, Cilento found work on stage almost immediately and was signed to a five-year contract by Alexander Korda. Her first leading film role was in the British film Passage Home (1955), opposite fellow Australian Peter Finch. She was in The Woman for Joe (1955) playing a Hungarian.

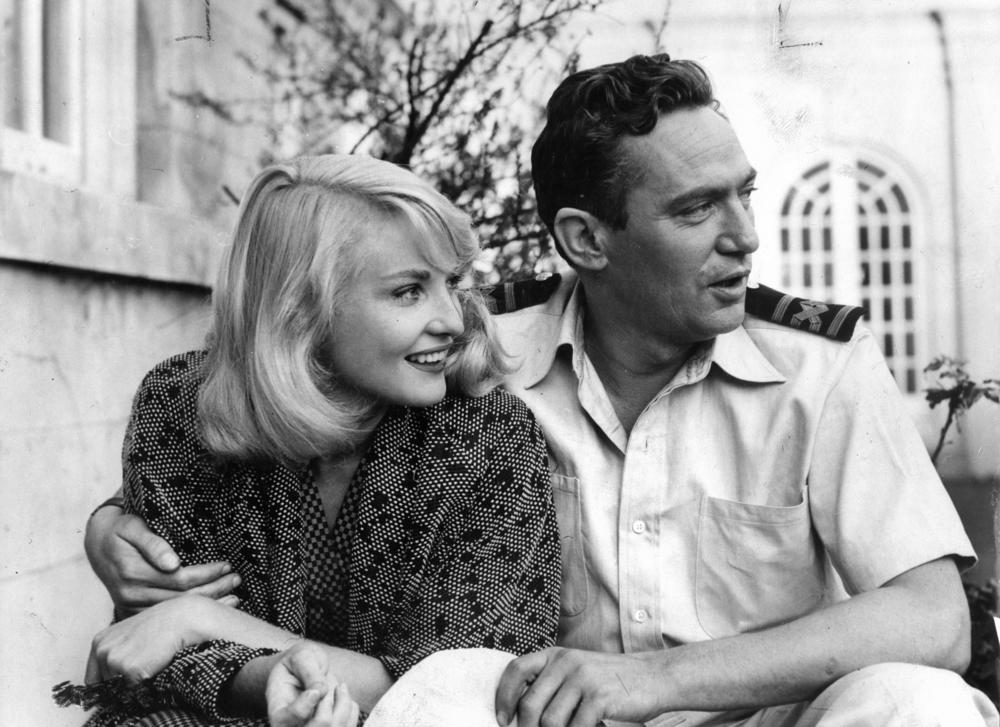
With Peter Finch in Passage Home (1955)

Soon securing roles in British films and working steadily until the end of the decade, in 1956, Cilento was nominated for a Tony Award for Best Supporting or Featured Actress (Dramatic) for Helen of Troy in Jean Giraudoux's Tiger at the Gates. She was nominated for the Academy Award for Best Supporting Actress for her performance in Tom Jones in 1963 and appeared in The Third Secret the following year.

Cilento starred with Charlton Heston in the 1965 film The Agony and the Ecstasy, and with Paul Newman in the 1967 western film Hombre, and had a supporting role in The Wicker Man (1973). She wrote the film The Last Tango with Rudolph Valentino designed by painter Patrick Hockey. Set in Sydney in 1975, it was about a woman so obsessed with Valentino that she has a shrine in her house to keep her memory of him alive.

Cilento can be heard in the Caedmon Records productions of Troilus and Cressida and Jean Cocteau's The Infernal Machine.

Cilento continued working as an actress, in films and television. In the 1980s, she settled in Mossman, north of Cairns, where she built her own outdoor theatre, named "Karnak", in the tropical rainforest. The venture allowed her to participate in experimental drama.

In 2001, she was awarded the Centenary Medal for "distinguished service to the arts, especially theatre".

== Personal life ==
In 1955, Cilento married Andrea Volpe, an Italian. She gave birth to their daughter Giovanna in 1957. Cilento and Volpe divorced in 1962. Later that year, Cilento married actor Sean Connery, with whom she had a son, Jason (born 1963). Cilento and Connery separated in 1971 and divorced in 1973. In her autobiography My Nine Lives, Cilento said that Connery was emotionally and physically abusive during their marriage. In 1985, Cilento married playwright Anthony Shaffer, whom she met in 1972 while working on The Wicker Man. They remained married until his death in 2001.

== Death ==
Cilento died of cancer at Cairns Base Hospital on 6 October 2011.

== Filmography ==
=== Film ===
Year	Title	Role	Notes
1951	Captain Horatio Hornblower	Maria Hornblower (voice)	Uncredited
1952	Wings of Danger	Jeannette	
1952	Moulin Rouge	Midinette	Uncredited
1953	All Hallowe'en	Harriet	Short film
1953	Meet Mr Lucifer	Woman on the street	Uncredited
1954	The Angel Who Pawned Her Harp	The Angel	
1954	The Passing Stranger	Jill	
1955	Passage Home	Ruth Elton	
1955	The Woman for Joe	Mary	
1957	The Admirable Crichton	Tweeny	
1957	The Truth About Women	Ambrosine Viney	
1959	Jet Storm	Angelica Como	
1960	The Full Treatment	Denise Colby	
1961	The Naked Edge	Mrs. Heath	
1962	I Thank a Fool	Liane Dane	
1963	Tom Jones	Molly Seagrim	Nominated — Academy Award for Best Supporting Actress; Nominated — Laurel Award for Top Female Supporting Performance (4th place)
1964	The Third Secret	Anne Tanner	
1964	Rattle of a Simple Man	Cyrenne	
1965	Once Upon a Tractor	Geraldine	Short film
1965	The Agony and the Ecstasy	Contessina de'Medici	
1967	Hombre	Jessie	
1968	Negatives	Reingard	
1972	Z.P.G.	Edna	
1973	Hitler: The Last Ten Days	Hanna Reitsch	
1973	The Wicker Man	Miss Rose	
1975	The Tiger Lily	Charlotte Brain	
1982	Duet for Four	Margot Mason	Feature film
1985	The Boy Who Had Everything	Mother	Feature film

=== Television ===
Year	Title	Role	Notes
1951	A Tomb with a View	Amy Heron	TV film
1955	The Alcoa Hour	Small Servant	TV series, Episode: "The Small Servant"
1956	The Taming of the Shrew	Bianca	TV film
1956	Film Fanfare	Herself	TV series, 1 episode
1957	Rich and Rich	Guest	TV series, 1 episode
1957–1961	ITV Television Playhouse	Various roles	TV series, 2 episodes
1958	Television World Theatre	Nina Leeds Evans	TV series, Episodes: "Strange Interlude: Part 1 & 2"
1959–1964	ITV Play of the Week	Various roles	TV series, 2 episodes
1959	Sunday Night Theatre	Anne	TV series, Episode: "The Concert"
1960	Armchair Theatre	Sadie Thompson	TV series, Episode: "Rain"
1961	Vanity Fair	Becky Sharp	TV series, Episode: "Part 1"
1963	Espionage	Lina	TV series, 1 Episode: "Festival of Pawns"
1964	The 36th Annual Academy Awards	Nominee	TV special
1964	Festival	Lysistrata	TV series, 1 Episode: "Lysistrata"
1964	Juke Box Jury	Panellist	TV series, 1 episode
1965	Blackmail	Euphrasia Jones	TV series, 1 Episode: "Cut Yourself a Slice of Throat"
1966	Court Martial		TV series, Episode: "La Belle France"
1966	The Eamonn Andrews Show	Guest	TV series, 1 episode
1967	Thirty-Minute Theatre	Penelope	TV series, 1 Episode: "Another Moon Called Earth"
1967	Dial M for Murder	Margo Wendice	TV film
1967	Whicker's World	Guest	TV series, 1 episode
1967	Good Company	Herself	TV series, 1 episode
1967	The Tonight Show with Johnny Carson	Guest	TV series, 1 episode
1968	Late Night Horror	Lady Sannox	TV series, Episode: "The Kiss of Blood"
1968	The Frankie Howerd Show	Guest	TV special
1968	Sydney Tonight	Guest	TV series, 1 episode
1969	ITV Sunday Night Theatre: Rogues' Gallery	Lady Sarah Bellasize	TV series, Regular role, 6 episodes
1970	Morecambe & Wise	Guest	TV series, 1 episode
1971	The Mike Douglas Show	Guest	TV series, 1 episode
1971	The David Frost Show	Guest	TV series, 2 episodes
1972	The Persuaders!	Kate Sinclair	TV series, Episode: "A Death in the Family"
1973	Thriller	Clara	TV series, Episode: "Spell of Evil"
1974	The Book Programme	Guest	TV series, 1 episode
1975	Affairs of the Heart	Elizabeth Damerel	TV series, Episode: "Elizabeth"
1975	The 17th Annual TV Week Logie Awards	Presenter	TV special
1975	Celebrity Squares	Contestant	TV series, 2 episodes
1978	Cappriccio!	Herself	TV series, 1 episode
1978	Everyman	Narrator	TV series, 1 episode
1978	Tycoon	Diana Clark	TV series, Regular role, 13 episodes
1979	Call My Bluff	Herself	TV series, 2 episodes
1979–1984	The Mike Walsh Show	Guest - Herself	TV series, 4 episodes
1980	The British Greats	Guest	TV series, 1 episode
1980	Big Toys	Mag TV film	
1981	Parkinson in Australia	Guest	TV series, 1 episode
1981	Diane Cilento: I Love Music	Host	TV special
1981	1981 Australian Film Institute Awards	Presenter	TV special
1982	Diane Cilento Festa Italiana	Presenter	TV special
1983	For The Term of His Natural Life	Lady Elinor Devine	TV miniseries, Recurring role, 2 episodes
1983	Willesee: Survival	Herself	TV special
1984	The Mike Walsh Show	Guest - Herself	TV series, 1 episode
1985	Fountain of Youth	Herself	Film documentary
1985	Out of Shot	Narrator	Film documentary
1986	The 1986 Australian Film Institute Awards	Presenter	TV special
1987; 1992	Sunday Afternoon	Herself	TV series, 2 episodes
1988	Queensland Day Royal Expo Concert	Host	TV special
1989	Burke's Backyard	Celebrity gardener	TV series, 1 episode
1993–1994	Halfway Across the Galaxy and Turn Left	Authoritax / Principa	TV series, Recurring role, 6 episodes
1994; 1995: 1998	Good Morning Australia	Guest	TV series, 3 episodes
1994	Ten Eyewitness News	Herself	TV series, 1 episode
1999	Laws	Guest	TV series, 1 episode
2003	The Brits Go To Hollywood	Guest	TV series, 1 episode
2004	Australian Story	Herself	TV series, 1 episode
2006	Enough Rope with Andrew Denton	Herself	TV series, 1 episode
2006	Mornings with Kerri-Anne	Herself	TV series, 1 episode
2006	9am with David & Kim	Herself	TV series, 1 episode
2007	Ken Adam's Production Films: You Only Live Twice	Herself	Video

=== Theatre ===
Year	Title	Role	Location	Notes
1955	Tiger at the Gates	Helen	Helen Hayes Theatre	Theatre World Award; Nominated — Tony Award for Best Featured Actress in a Play
1959	Heartbreak House	Ellie Dunn	Billy Rose Theatre	
1960	The Good Soup	Marie-Paule II	Plymouth Theatre	

== Writings ==
- 1967 novel: The Manipulator. Charles Scribner's Sons.
- 1970 novel: Hybrid. Dell Publishing.
- 2007 autobiography: My Nine Lives. Penguin Books. ISBN 9780143006077
