= Queensland Children's Hospital =

Specialist paediatric health service in Brisbane, Australia

- Queensland Health
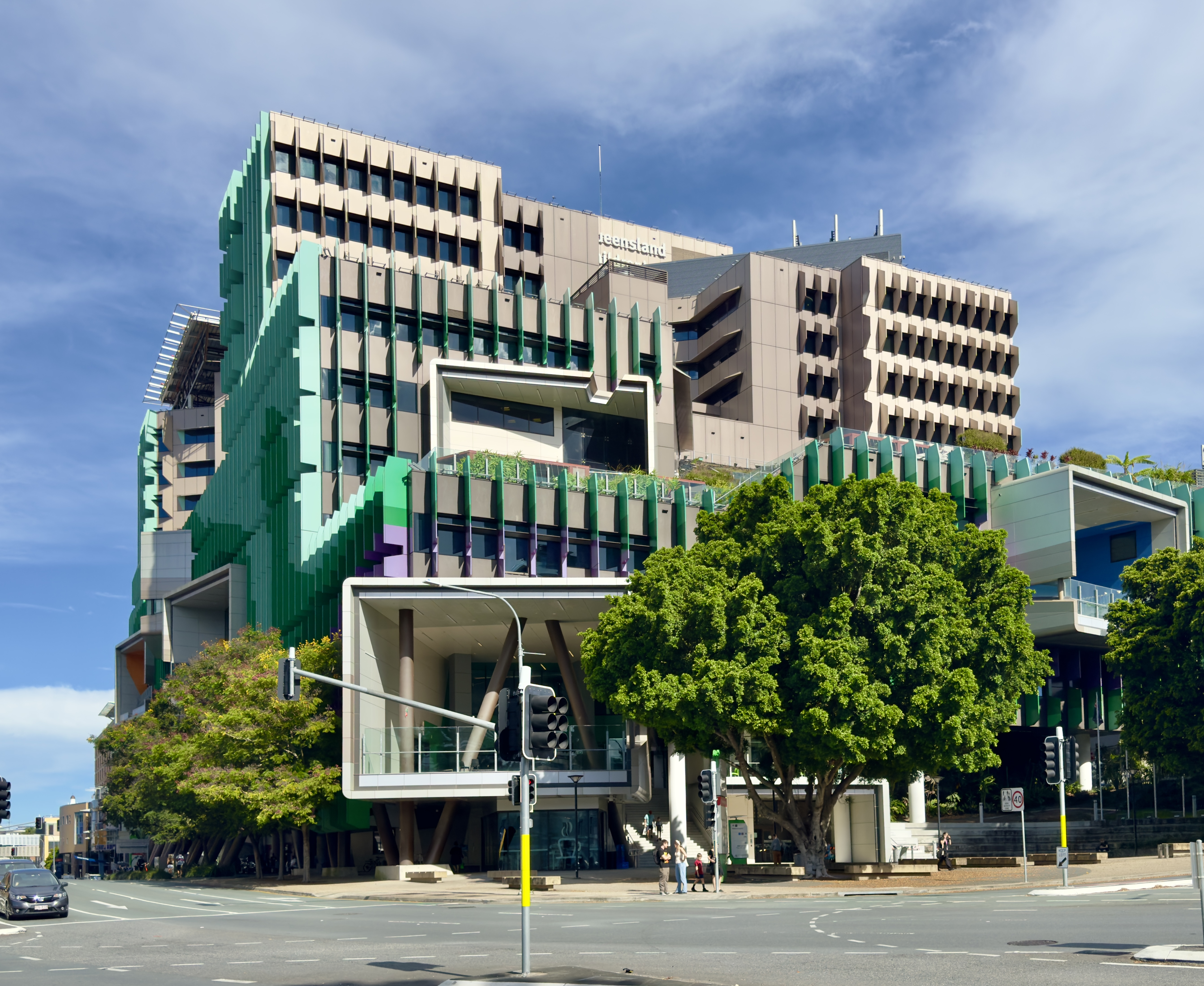
- Main entrance of the Queensland Children's Hospital

Geography
- Location: South Brisbane, Queensland, Australia
- Coordinates: 27.483961725459036°S 153.02635997781977°E

Organisation
- Care system: Public (Medicare)
- Type: Specialist

Services
- Emergency department: Yes
- Beds: 359 overnight inpatient beds
- Speciality: Paediatrics

Helipads
- Helipad: (ICAO: YXQC)

History
- Founded: 29 November 2014; 11 years ago

Links
- Website: childrens.health.qld.gov.au/qch

The public Queensland Children's Hospital (QCH), on Stanley Street in South Brisbane, Queensland, Australia, is the primary facility of Children's Health Queensland. QCH has an emergency department and intensive care unit, offering specialist general medical and surgical services.

The QCH is classified as a level-six service under the Clinical Services Capability Framework 2014, offering general health services to children and young people in the greater Brisbane metropolitan area and tertiary-level care.

== History ==
QCH was opened as the Lady Cilento Children's Hospital on 29 November 2014. A single specialist paediatric hospital for Brisbane was recommended by a task force commissioned in 2006 to examine Queensland's paediatric cardiac services. The Queensland Government assembled the task force in light of the Mellis Review, which had found the then-current model of paediatric care to be fragmented and unsustainable. It recommended that all services should be consolidated into a single children’s hospital.

QCH combined the former Royal Children's Hospital, the former Mater Children's Hospital, and the paediatric cardiac services formerly offered by The Prince Charles Hospital into one new facility. The estimated construction cost of QCH was A$1.2 billion. The 12-level facility is one of Queensland's primary health services for children.

=== Hospital name ===
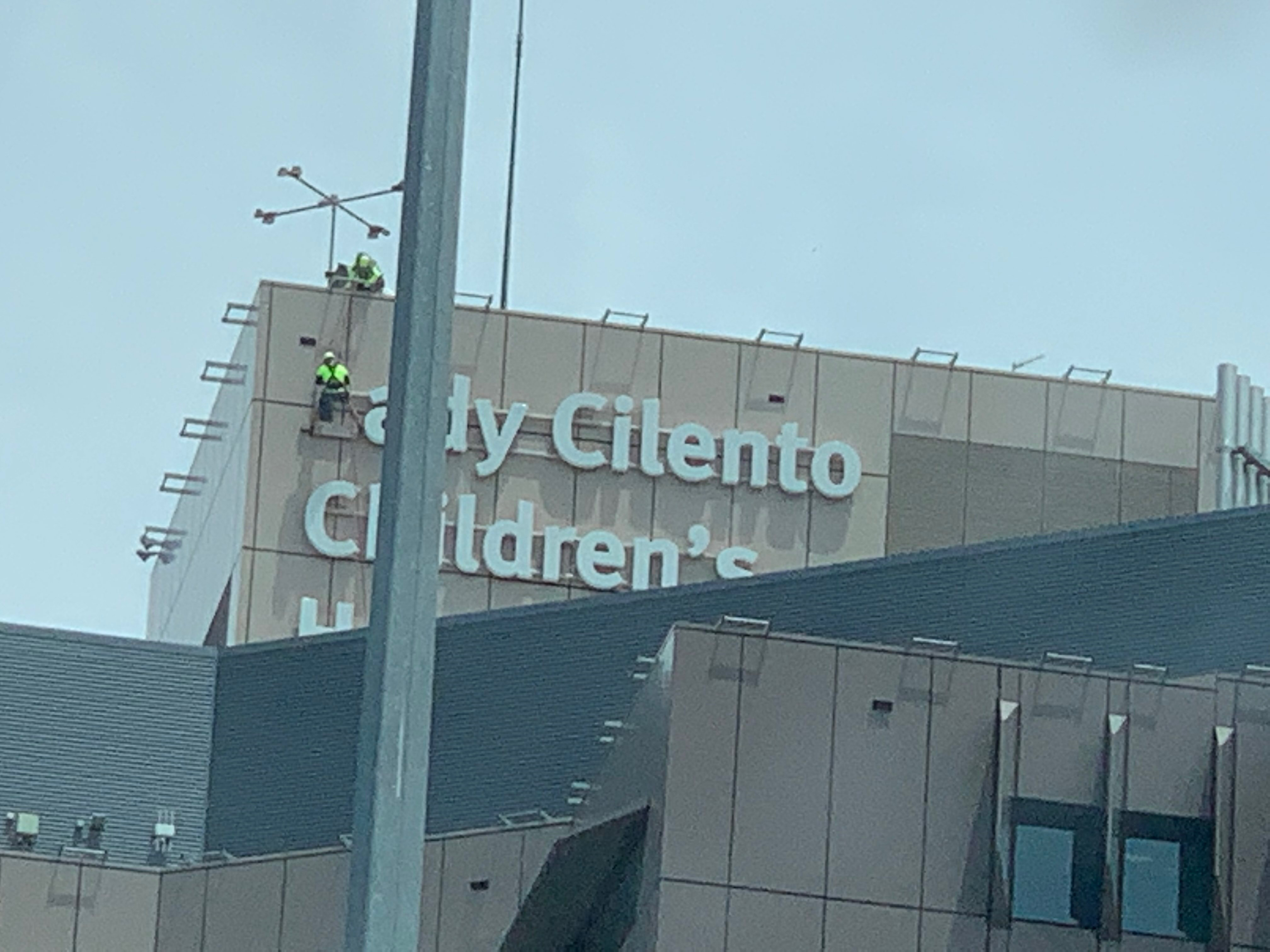
Workers removing the L from the Lady Cilento Children's Hospital building to facilitate the renaming as Queensland Children's Hospital

During the early stages of the project, the hospital was known as the Queensland Children's Hospital. On 15 December 2013, the then Queensland Premier Campbell Newman announced that the hospital would be named after Queensland clinician Phyllis, Lady Cilento.

On 21 September 2018, Health Minister Steven Miles announced that the hospital would revert to the name of Queensland Children's Hospital after staff petitioned the Queensland government to change the name. Staff cited concerns over views on race and homosexuality expressed by Cilento. The government announced support due to concerns of community confusion over whether the hospital is public or private. The hospital's foundation stated a conventional name would secure more funding for medical research from international donors.

An online poll conducted by the government indicated support for the name change. Later reports suggested that many votes originated from government IP addresses, prompting allegations of potential manipulation of the poll, and Miles was referred to the Queensland Crime and Corruption Commission (CCC). On 13 December 2018, workers began the removal of the words "Lady Cilento" from the sign on the building.

== Education and research ==
The QCH collaborates with universities, including The University of Queensland and the Queensland University of Technology, on research programs. It is co-located with the Centre for Children's Health Research, which officially opened on 27 November 2015.

The nine-level centre houses:

- wet and dry laboratories;
- pathology services;
- a gait laboratory;
- a nutrition laboratory; and
- the Queensland Children's Tumor Bank (funded by the Children's Hospital Foundation), which provides a tissue repository for national and international cancer research.

== Design ==
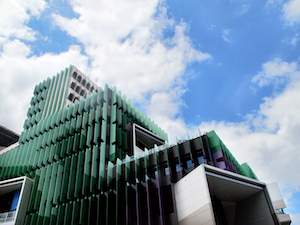
The design of the hospital maximises access to outside views and natural light.

The QCH was designed by the firm Conrad Garget Lyons. Based on the concept of a living tree, the building was designed as a network of trunks and branches running throughout the complex, with outdoor gardens and terraces that fill the hospital with as much natural light as possible.

The building design has received a number of awards, including:

- the 2015 Queensland State Architecture Award;
- the F.D.G Stanley Award for Public Architecture; and
- the Karl Langer Award for Urban Design from the Australian Institute of Architects.

At the 2015 Design and Health International Academy Awards, the Hospital design was awarded as the overall winner for Autogenic Design Project for Healthcare Environment.

== Schooling ==
The hospital provides educational programs to students from prep to year 12 for inpatients, outpatients, and family members of hospitalised patients in several settings and locations across the hospital community.

== See also ==
- List of hospitals in Queensland
- List of hospitals in Australia
- List of children's hospitals
- Healthcare in Australia
