= Stanley Dover =

Stanley Dover may refer to:

- Stanley and His Monster, a human and monster duo from DC Comics
- Star City Slayer, his criminal grandfather
- Stanley Dover (Arrowverse), the Arrowverse version of the character
