= Brotherhood (2019 film) =

2019 survival film about an actual 1926 boating tragedy

- Theatrical release poster
- Directed by: Richard Bell
- Written by: Richard Bell
- Produced by: Mehernaz Lentin; Anand Ramayya
- Starring: Brendan Fehr; Brendan Fletcher; Jake Manley; Dylan Everett
- Cinematography: Adam Swica
- Edited by: Sarah Peddie
- Music by: William Rowson
- Production companies: Industry Pictures; Karma Film
- Distributed by: levelFILM
- Release date: July 20, 2019
- Running time: 96 minutes
- Country: Canada
- Language: English

Brotherhood is a 2019 Canadian period drama film written and directed by Richard Bell. Set in the 1920s, the film recounts the true story of a group of youth at a summer camp on Balsam Lake in the Kawartha Lakes, who had to fight for survival when an unforeseen thunderstorm overwhelmed their canoe trip. The film's cast includes Brendan Fehr, Brendan Fletcher, Jake Manley, Gage Munroe and Dylan Everett.

== Plot ==
In the opening scenes, Arthur Lambden packs a photo of his son in his backpack. He meets the young members of the Brotherhood of St. Andrew and their leader, Robert Butcher, on the path to Long Point, a camp on the shores of Balsam Lake in the Kawartha Lakes, 145 kilometres northeast of Toronto. Both Butcher, who is the camp leader, and Lambden, who is second in command, are veterans of World War I. Butcher tells Lambden that, while it was his first time operating a camping trip at Long Point, the group had camped at Clear Lake for many years. He told Lambden that the youth—whose fathers had died in the war or in the Spanish flu pandemic that followed the war—would benefit from being in the rugged outdoors. Butcher is concerned that the boys of the generation that succeeded their own were being "feminized by their mothers and teachers." They begin their canoe trip late in the evening, and when their 30-foot war canoe is capsized during a sudden summer squall, drowning some, those that did survive spend the night in the frigid, dark lake waters clinging to the overturned canoe that is slowly sinking. The survivors struggle to ward off the freezing cold and fighting fatigue, hypothermia, and their fears. The film alternates between scenes of their struggle and lively, happy scenes from earlier in the evening when the boys formed a "band of brothers" through camp activities designed for male bonding. The movie focuses on the individual lives of some of the characters before the camping trip. George Waller played by Jake Manley, had an abusive father; Arthur Lambden, played by Brendan Fletcher, had survived the front lines in World War I only to return home as a carrier of the Spanish flu virus that killed his own wife and child; the two brothers—Will played by Sam Ashe Arnold and Jack played by Gage Munroe, whose father had been killed during the war; and Leonard, played by Matthew Isen, whose father had drowned years before the camping trip and who feared water. After surviving a harrowing night on the lake, only four remain alive and finally crawl onto the shores of Grand Island. They find makeshift paddles and return to Long Point.

== Cast ==
- Brendan Fehr as Robert Butcher
- Brendan Fletcher as Arthur Lambden
- Jake Manley as George Waller
- Matthew Isen as Leonard O'Hara
- Sam Ashe Arnold as Will
- Gage Munroe as Jack Wigington
- Mike Taylor as Mark
- Dylan Everett as Ray Allen
- Evan Marsh as Oliver Mardall
- Spencer MacPherson as Vernon Clarke
- Haig McGarry as Gordon Heale

== Filming ==
Principal photography on the film started in September 2017 in Michipicoten.

== Screenings ==
The film received a private theatrical screening for residents of the Balsam Lake community in July 2019, which was also attended by provincial lieutenant governor Elizabeth Dowdeswell. It began screening on the Canadian film festival circuit in the fall, including at the Cinéfest Sudbury International Film Festival.

== Release ==
The film opened theatrically on December 6, 2019, in Toronto and went on to screen at over 80 theatres nationally.

== Awards ==
In 2020, the visual effects team of Adam Jewett, Steve Ramone, Michelle Brennen, Tim Sibley, Aneesh Bhatnagar, Saikrishna Aleti, Peter Giliberti, Alex Basso, Arminus Billones and Marshall Lau won the Canadian Screen Award for Best Visual Effects at the 8th Canadian Screen Awards. The same year, Bell and Bramwell Tovey received a Canadian Screen Award nomination for Best Original Song for the song "I've Got a Big One".

== Legacy ==
On July 20, 2026, a special screening of the film was held at the Canadian Canoe Museum to mark the 100th anniversary of the Balsam Lake tragedy. The event was attended by director Richard Bell alongside members of the cast.

== Reviews ==
A December 5, 2019 Globe and Mail review said that Bell had succeeded in "stripping back the mythos of what it means 'to be a man'." He showed how strong one can be under duress "while embracing compassion, vulnerability and love."

The National Post called it a "powerful, fight-for-survival" film.

The San Francisco Bay Times said the "scenes in the lake are artfully filmed" and that Bell created a "sense in the open water that alternates between claustrophobia and momentum."

The Now review said that the film "nearly sinks" and that it was "less than the sum of its parts."

Original Cin said it was "interestingly fashioned as a “lost generation” metaphor" with some "loose ends."
