= Richard Bell (director) =

Canadian film director and screenwriter

- Born: New Westminster, British Columbia, Canada
- Years active: 2000–present

Richard Bell is a Canadian film director and screenwriter. He is most noted as the writer and director of the films Eighteen and Brotherhood.

A survival / adventure drama, based on a true story, Brotherhood stars Brendan Fehr, Brendan Fletcher, Jake Manley, Gage Munroe, Dylan Everett, Matthew Isen and Sam Ashe Arnold. It was filmed on the Michipicoten First Nation and at Revival Film Studios in Toronto, Canada. Brotherhood won the Canadian Screen Award for Achievement in Visual Effects.

Eighteen stars Brendan Fletcher, Carly Pope, Mark Hildreth, Thea Gill, and Alan Cumming. The film was narrated by Ian McKellen, with music composed by Bramwell Tovey and performed by the Vancouver Symphony Orchestra. Eighteen was released on DVD on June 27, 2006. It made its Canadian broadcast television premiere on Citytv on March 1, 2008 and became available on iTunes in 2010.

Bell co-executive produced the coming-of-age dramedy Anthem of a Teenage Prophet starring Cameron Monaghan and Juliette Lewis.

Bell got his start in the film industry writing and directing the micro-budgeted, 60 minute drama Two Brothers.

He is a graduate of Studio 58, the professional theatre training program at Langara College.

== Awards ==
In 2020, Bell was nominated for a Canadian Screen Award for co-writing the original song "I've Got A Big One" with composer Bramwell Tovey for Brotherhood. He was previously nominated with Tovey in 2007 for a Genie Award for co-writing the song "In a Heartbeat" for his film Eighteen. Vancouver newspaper Xtra West awarded him Visual Artist of the Year for the same film at their annual Hero Awards that year.
