= Thea Gill =

Canadian actress

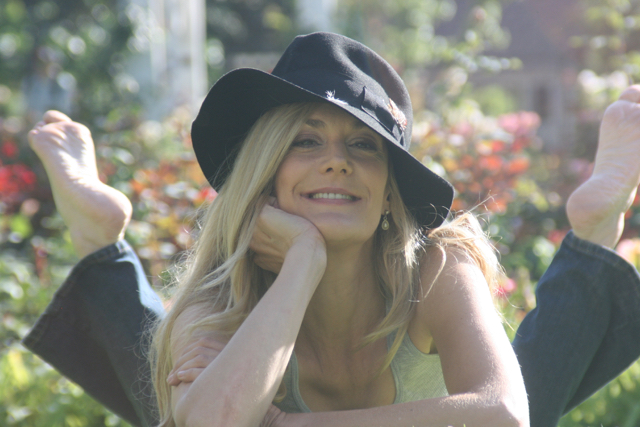
- Born: Thea Louise Gill; April 5, 1970 (age 56); Vancouver, British Columbia, Canada
- Education: York University (BFA Hons)
- Occupation: Actress
- Years active: 1992–present
- Spouse: Brian Richmond (m. 1993; div. 2009)
- Partner: Gina Glass (2013–present)

Thea Louise Gill (/ˈteɪ.ə/; born April 5, 1970) is a Canadian actress best known for her starring role as Lindsay Peterson in the Showtime television series Queer as Folk.

== Early life ==
As a child, Gill lived in Vancouver and attended a private girls' school there for twelve years. After graduating from the private school, Gill attended university at York University in Toronto. Gill graduated from York University in 1992 with a BFA Honours in Theatre Performance.

== Career ==
After graduating from York, Gill lived in Toronto and spent the next several years working in theatre, guest roles in television series, commercials, and some film roles.

Gill's big break came in 2000 when she auditioned for and received the role of Lindsay Peterson in Queer as Folk. Gill held this role for the five season run of Queer as Folk. In 2001 Gill moved from Toronto to Victoria, British Columbia. Gill divided her time between Toronto (shooting Queer as Folk) and Victoria up to 2005 when Queer as Folk concluded.

With the conclusion of Queer as Folk, Gill has had a number of theatre, television, and film roles. In 2006 she joined the cast of the here! network original series Dante's Cove, billed as a "special guest star" in the role of Diana Childs. In a July 2007 interview, Gill stated that she decided to move to Los Angeles for a year to an attempt to find longer-term acting roles.

In addition to her acting work, Gill is also a jazz singer and has worked as the Midsummer Lounge's featured act on board the Mediterranean and Caribbean cruise ship M.S. Carousel. Gill also did in 2002 a three-night solo singing act at the jazz club, Top o' the Senator, in Toronto. In 2005, Gill appeared in director Richard Bell's Eighteen as a seductive World War II-era chanteuse. This marked Gill's first singing performance in a movie. The song, "In a Heartbeat", was written by Bramwell Tovey and was later nominated for a Genie Award.

== Personal life ==
Gill's partner since 2013 is author Gina Glass. Gill was previously married for 16 years to Brian Richmond, a Canadian director, from 1993 to 2009. When Gill was asked in 2003, during her time on Queer As Folk, "Would you say you are bisexual?", she confirmed this saying, "I guess, well I've thought about that a lot. And I guess perhaps I am."

== Filmography ==
=== Film ===
| Year | Title | Role | Notes |
|---|---|---|---|
| 1993 | Lilly | Julia | |
| 1998 | Papertrail | Eileen Gibbs | |
| 2000 | Washed Up | Bunny | |
| 2004 | Ice Men | Jennifer | |
| 2005 | Eighteen | Hannah | |
| 2006 | Truth | Laura | Video |
| 2006 | Seed | Sandra Bishop | |
| 2007 | Swap | The Woman | Short |
| 2008 | Mulligans | Stacey Davidson | |
| 2009 | Four Steps | Faye | Short |
| 2009 | Remembering Nigel | Thea Gill | |
| 2009 | The Strange Case of DJ Cosmic | Loretta | Short |
| 2009 | Pants on Fire | Ruth | Short |
| 2010 | The Boy She Met Online | Kendra Oliver | |
| 2010 | The Putt Putt Syndrome | Sam | |
| 2011 | Slip Away | Linda | Short |
| 2011 | Mother Country | Andrea Dupree | |
| 2015 | The Grid: Zombie Outlet Mall | Hazel Switch (voice) | |
| 2016 | Love, Colin | Jennifer | Short |
| 2016 | 20th Century Women | Gail Porter | |
| 2019 | Throw Like a Girl | Julie | Short |
| 2020 | Shepard | Sherry | |

=== Television ===
| Year | Title | Role | Notes |
|---|---|---|---|
| 1995 | Kung Fu: The Legend Continues | Sue | - |
| 1998 | Due South | Tawny | Episode: "Mountie on the Bounty: Part 2" |
| 2000 | Common Ground | Willa | TV film |
| 2000–2005 | Queer as Folk | Lindsay Peterson | Main role |
| 2001 | Life with Judy Garland: Me and My Shadows | Lucille Bremer | TV miniseries |
| 2002 | Tornado Warning | Dee Mazur | TV film |
| 2002 | Just Cause | Sally Stern | Episodes: "Pilot: Parts 1 & 2" |
| 2003 | Bliss | Nina | Episode: "Nina's Muse" |
| 2004 | Andromeda | Celine | Episode: "When Goes Around..." |
| 2005 | The Collector | Caroline Beaumont | Episode: "The Mother" |
| 2005 | Masters of Horror | Jane Cleaver | Episode: "Homecoming" |
| 2006 | Lesser Evil | Margaret Dalton | TV film |
| 2006–2007 | Dante's Cove | Diana Childs | Main role (seasons 2–3) |
| 2009 | Ghost Whisperer | Amy Warner | - |
| 2010 | Lies Between Friends | Cait Randell | TV film |
| 2012 | My Mother's Secret | Deputy Kane | TV film |
| 2012 | Failing Upwards | Hazel Hamilton | Episode: "Estate Sale" |
| 2013 | Stonados | Tara Laykin | TV film |
| 2014 | Castle | Gloria Robbins | Episode: "Dressed to Kill" |
| 2016 | 10 Year Reunion | Mrs. Edwards | TV film |
| 2016 | In the Black | Julie Fine | TV film |

== Awards and nominations ==
- 2003, won a Golden Sheaf Award for her work in an episode of Bliss
- 2003, received The National Leadership Award from the National Gay and Lesbian Task Force.
- 2003, nominated for an ACTRA Award for 'Outstanding Performance' for her role in Queer as Folk
- 2005, won a Leo Award for 'Best Guest Performance by a Female' for her work on an episode of The Collector.
- 2007, nominated for a Leo Award for 'Best Actress in a Short Drama' for Swap
