= Eighteen (film) =

- Theatrical Release Poster
- Directed by: Richard Bell
- Written by: Richard Bell
- Produced by: Harry Sutherland, Cari Green, Dennis Tal
- Starring: Brendan Fletcher; Carly Pope; Paul Anthony; Mark Hildreth; Thea Gill; Alan Cumming; David Beazely; Clarence Sponagle; Gabrielle Rose; Serge Houde
- Narrated by: Ian McKellen
- Cinematography: Kevin J. van Niekerk
- Edited by: Grace Yuen
- Music by: Bramwell Tovey
- Distributed by: Domino Film
- Release dates: September 25, 2005 (Calgary International Film Festival); June 16, 2006 (Canada)
- Running time: 101 minutes
- Country: Canada
- Language: English

Eighteen is a 2005 Canadian drama film written and directed by Richard Bell.

== Plot ==
The film follows Pip, a street kid who is meeting life head-on in the big city. On his eighteenth birthday he receives his grandfather's Second World War memoirs on audio cassette, a gift that awakens the ghost of the long lost world. His grandfather relates the story of the day he turned eighteen, fleeing German forces through the woods of France with a dying comrade hanging on for life. In Pip's own and contemporary way, he begins to live the parallel life of his grandfather, both lost in their environments and generations. Along Pip's path he stumbles into an unlikely alliance with Clark, a gay street hustler on the make, and Jenny, an aspiring social worker who tempts Pip with feelings of love and domesticity. He also forges a small but important relationship with a local priest, in whom he confides his deepest secret: the death of his brother and the heinous act his father committed against him before his passing.

== Cast and characters ==
- Paul Anthony as Pip Anders

Pip is a streetkid who turns eighteen as the story begins. His tortured spirit simmers beneath his punky and sarcastic surface.

- Brendan Fletcher as Private Jason Anders

Jason Anders is a wide-eyed, eighteen-year-old Coldstream Guard soldier who has been dropped in the middle of the battle. He is conflicted between his duty and his natural impulse to run away.

- Clarence Sponagle as Clark

Clark is a gay hustler who, between keeping a regular clientele to go-go dancing to selling videos of himself "jerkin’", has created a comfortable life for himself. A life that is thrown upside down when he meets Pip.

- Carly Pope as Jenny

Jenny is a sensitive, selfless young spirit who is an aspiring social worker. When it comes to dating troubled men, she has no qualms about rushing in where angels fear to tread.

- Mark Hildreth as Corporal Phillip Macauley

Macauley is a medic who has seen so much blood and war he has developed a secret and deadly coping method. He spends the entire story with a bullet in his gut.

- David Beazely as Jeff

Jeff is an affable gas station attendant who is spectacularly in love with Clark.

- Thea Gill as Hannah, a WWII chanteuse

Hannah is a WWII entertainer. She smokes, sings, and gives private encores to privates.

- Alan Cumming as Father Chris

Father Chris is a priest who chooses to pound the pavement rather than preach at a pulpit. A kindred spirit, he feeds and befriends the troubled souls of the street.

- Ian McKellen as the elderly Jason Anders (in voice)

== Music ==
The soundtrack was written by British-born, Canadian composer Bramwell Tovey and performed by the Vancouver Symphony Orchestra. Tovey was nominated, in tandem with lyricist Richard Bell, for the Best Original Song Genie Award for "In a Heartbeat", which appears in the World War II thread of the film.

== Release ==
Because it featured both straight and gay characters, Eighteen appeared at numerous mainstream and gay film festivals. It premiered on June 16, 2006, in Vancouver, where it had a brief theatrical run; it was released that same month on DVD in the U.S. Eighteen was broadcast on Movie Central, The Movie Network, City TV, and Bravo in Canada, and on Here TV in the United States. On 27 July 2009, the DVD was released in Europe. In September 2010, it became available on iTunes in the United States; in October, it came to iTunes Canada.
