= Little Criminals (film) =

- Genre: Crime drama
- Written by: Dennis Foon
- Directed by: Stephen Surjik
- Starring: Brendan Fletcher; Myles Ferguson
- Music by: Fred Mollin
- Country of origin: Canada
- Original language: English

Production
- Producer: Phil Savath
- Cinematography: Stephen Reizes
- Editor: Alison Grace
- Running time: 91 minutes
- Production company: CBC Television

Original release
- Network: CBC Television
- Release: January 21, 1996

Little Criminals is a 1996 Canadian crime drama television film directed by Stephen Surjik, written by Dennis Foon, and starring Brendan Fletcher and Myles Ferguson. The film was shot in Vancouver in the spring of 1995. It was produced by CBC Television, which aired it on January 21, 1996.

== Plot ==
Eleven-year-old Des and his friends engage in a variety of illegal activities including vandalism, stealing, lighting fires, mugging people and using drugs. In Canada the age of criminal responsibility is twelve. Des takes advantage of this law because he knows that the police cannot charge him until he reaches that age.

Des meets Cory on the schoolyard when the latter gets into a fight. Impressed with Cory standing up to a bully in the playground, the two become friends and start a crime spree together. After breaking into a home and ransacking it with Cory's toddler sister, Nonny in tow, the two are arrested.

After being taken to the police station, where Cory is detained. Cory's mother and stepfather try to keep him away from Des, but despite their best attempts, Cory continues to meet with him.

Des, who lives in squalor, comes home to find a police officer and a social worker in the kitchen, talking to his mother about his behavior in the wake of his recent arrest, which she doesn't take seriously. Following an incident where Des gets stabbed by his mother, he ends up in an assessment centre for troubled children. In the centre he meets Rita, a psychologist who tries to understand Des's motivations, and over time gets some positive results on his behaviour.

Des's mother relinquishes custody of him, which he has a hard time accepting. Rita informs Des that they are trying to find him a foster home, but Des takes the news with disgust and flees as soon as Cory visits him.

They both want to get out of the city and plan to rob Chet, the local dealer. During the robbery, Cory confesses to stealing an item, which prompts Chet to attack him. After hesitation, Des shoots and kills Chet with a stolen firearm.

Following the killing, Cory becomes afraid of Des and wants nothing to do with him, going as far as asking his stepfather to protect him. As Des approaches the vehicle, he is confronted by the school police officer who reminds him he will be 12 years old in a month's time. Hearing that, Des opts to flee the schoolyard.

Des, who is still on the run because of his escape from the assessment centre, goes to his home where he sees his mother passed out and intoxicated in the bedroom with a boyfriend, oblivious to his presence.

Not wanting to be in foster care or arrested when he turns twelve years old, Des sets the house on fire and conceals himself in a closet, falling asleep as the house slowly engulfs in flames.

== Cast ==
- Brendan Fletcher as Des: The troubled kid who leads the gang of little criminals
- Myles Ferguson as Cory: Des's best friend
- Adam Harrison as House: Part of the gang
- Jordan Clarke as Sam
- London Sam Baergen as Jamal
- John Nguyen as Nick
- Loc Vo as Tak
- Randy Hughson as Vince: Cory's stepfather
- Mimi Kuzyk as Rita: A psychologist who tries to understand Des
- Dwight McFee as Clarke
- Jed Rees as Chet: A dealer who buys stolen goods and sells drugs to kids
- Callum Keith Rennie as Kostash: A police officer
- Sonia Norris as Judy
- Keely Purvis as Nonny
- (uncredited) - Sandra Oh

== Production ==
Little Criminals was produced, financed and developed by CBC Television. Filming began in the spring of 1995 in Vancouver, and lasted for six weeks.

== Release ==
Little Criminals aired on CBC Television on January 21, 1996.

== Awards ==
- Gemini Awards: Best Picture Editing in a Dramatic Program or Series (Alison Grace)
- Gemini Awards: Best Writing in a Dramatic Program (Dennis Foon)
- Geneva Cinéma Tout Ecran: Stephen Surjik
- Leo Awards: Best Actor (Brendan Fletcher)
- Leo Awards: Best Editing in a Picture (Alison Grace)
- Leo Awards: Best Production Design in a Picture (Lawrence Collett)
- Leo Awards: Best Screenwriter of a Picture (Dennis Foon)
- Writers Guild of Canada Award: Dennis Foon

=== Nominations ===
- Gemini Awards: Best Direction in a Dramatic Program (Stephen Surjik)
- Gemini Awards: Best Performance by an Actor in a Leading Role in a Dramatic Program (Brendan Fletcher)
- Gemini Awards: Best Performance by an Actress in a Featured Supporting Role in a Dramatic Program (Mimi Kuzyk)
- Gemini Awards: Best Performance by an Actress in a Featured Supporting Role in a Dramatic Program (Sabrina Grdevich)
- Gemini Awards: Best Photography in a Dramatic Program or Series (Stephen Reizes)
- Gemini Awards: Best Production Design or Art Direction (Lawrence Collett)
- Gemini Awards: Best Sound in a Dramatic Program or Series (Hans Fousek, Paul A. Sharpe, Bill Moore, Jacqueline Cristianini, Dean Giammarco, Anke Bakker)
- Gemini Awards: Best TV Movie (Phil Savath)
- Leo Awards: Best Director of a Picture (Stephen Surjik)
- Leo Awards: Best Picture (Phil Savath)
