= Weapons of Mass Distraction =

- Written by: Larry Gelbart
- Directed by: Stephen Surjik
- Starring: Gabriel Byrne; Ben Kingsley
- Music by: Don Davis
- Country of origin: United States
- Original language: English

Production
- Producer: Sean Ryerson
- Cinematography: Alar Kivilo
- Editor: Zach Staenberg
- Running time: 100 min

Original release
- Release: May 17, 1997

Weapons of Mass Distraction is a 1997 television film directed by Stephen Surjik and written by Larry Gelbart, about two media moguls and their fight over ownership of a professional American football team. The film starred Gabriel Byrne and Ben Kingsley, with an ensemble supporting cast including Illeana Douglas, Mimi Rogers, and Jeffrey Tambor.

The film was nominated for four awards at the 49th Primetime Emmy Awards, including Outstanding Writing for a Miniseries or a Special for Gelbart.

== Plot ==
Lionel Powers and Julian Messenger are filthy rich men with vast media holdings and dirty family secrets. They play dirty as well, fighting for control over a professional football team in Los Angeles with every weapon at their disposal. Powers' bid attracts particular controversy since he intends to retain ownership of a successful football club in Tucson. During Congressional hearings, U.S. Senator Billy Paxton makes his objections to the obvious conflict of interest clearly known.

As the billionaires ruthlessly scheme and squabble, they wreak havoc on the lives and careers of thousands of people. Powers is particularly unscrupulous as he specifically targets a number of well-known individuals. Among his targets is not only Senator Paxton, against whom he carries an obvious grudge, but also far less "culpable" individuals such as children's television presenter Robin Zimmer and plastic surgeon Dr. Jonathon Cummings, whose lives are upended merely because Powers is convinced this will serve (or eliminate a perceived threat to) his interests.

Among the everyday people affected is Jerry Pascoe, who loses his well-paying job as a consequence of wider cost-cutting moves by Powers. As the Pascoe family struggles to make ends meet, Jerry's marriage with his wife Rita becomes strained due to Jerry's continuing inability to find and hold jobs as menial as cleaning stadium restrooms and selling peanuts.

After Powers and Messenger fail to resolve their differences in a secret face-to-face meeting, the wealthy characters continue to blackmail one another as homeless people look for handouts. The exposure of tabloid-worthy secrets of lives of Powers' wife Ariel and right-hand man Alan Blanchard lead to dire consequences for all. Although Blanchard is privy to the intimate details of Powers' most embarrassing personal secret, he opts for suicide instead of revenge after his downfall.

In spite of all of his ruthlessness, the propects of Powers' Los Angeles bid look increasingly dim until he is able to procure details of the Messenger family's darkest and most damaging secret. Once Powers discreetly divulges his knowledge to Messenger, Senator Paxton quickly brokers an uneasy compromise in which the feuding moguls agree to share ownership of the Los Angeles football franchise.

In the meantime, the marriage of the Pascoes turns tragi-comically from a terrible climax to fodder for reality TV.

== Cast ==
- Gabriel Byrne as Lionel Powers
- Ben Kingsley as Julian Messenger
- Mimi Rogers as Ariel Powers
- Jeffrey Tambor as Alan Blanchard
- Illeana Douglas as Rita Pascoe
- Paul Mazursky as Dr. Jonathon Cummings
- Chris Mulkey as Jerry Pascoe
- R. Lee Ermey as Billy Paxton
- Caroline Aaron as Robin Zimmer
- Jason Lee as Philip Messenger
