= Stephen Surjik =

Canadian film and TV director (born 1960)

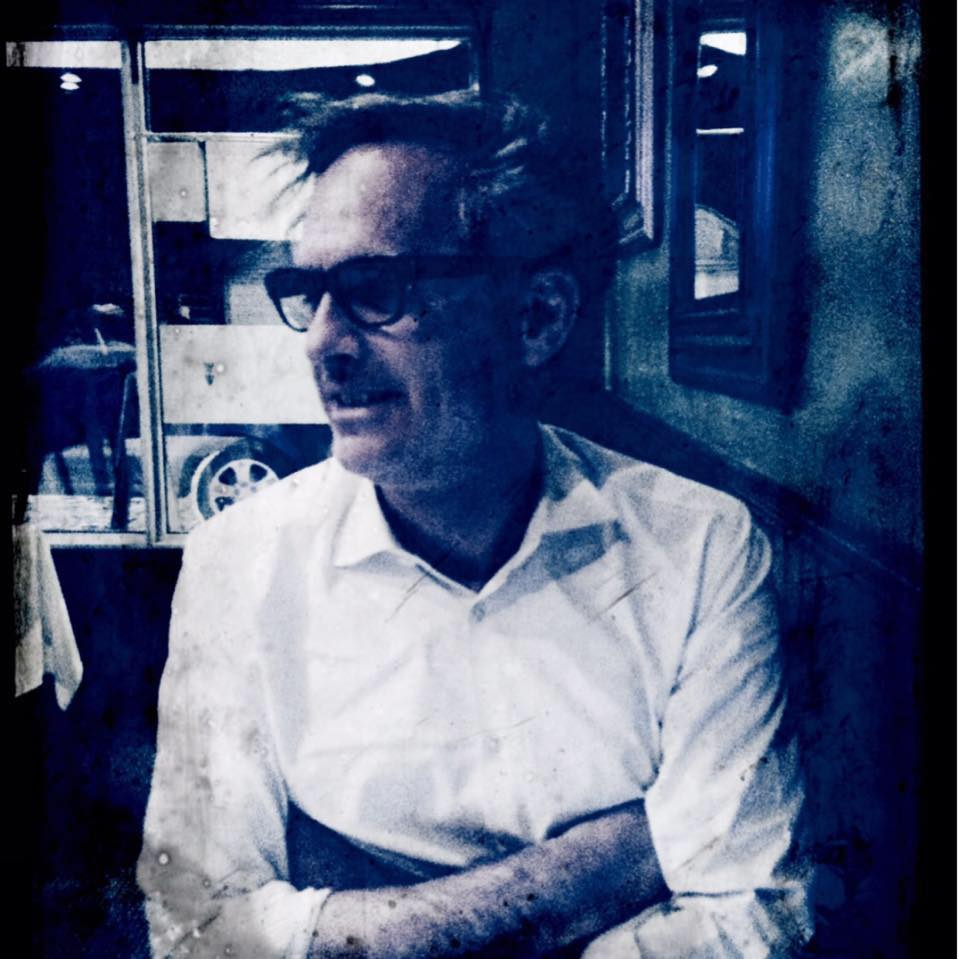
- Born: 1960 (age 65–66); Regina, Canada
- Education: Concordia University
- Occupation: Director

Stephen Surjik (born 1960) is a Canadian film and television director, and producer. He is known for his work on the film Wayne's World 2, the Marvel Television series Daredevil and The Punisher, the Netflix series The Umbrella Academy and The Witcher. He was nominated three times for Gemini Awards for best direction, for Little Criminals, Tripping the Wire: A Stephen Tree Mystery and Intelligence, and received four Emmy Award nominations for Weapons of Mass Distraction.

== Career ==
Born in Regina, Saskatchewan in 1960, he studied at the Concordia University in Montreal and received a Best Director award at the 14th Canadian Student Film & Video Festival in 1982 for Second Story Man.

After working as production designer and art director in the mid-80s, he moved on, directing for the series The Kids in the Hall. In 1993 Surjik made his feature film debut with Wayne's World 2, starring fellow Canadian Mike Myers.

For television, he has directed films such as the 1996 Grand Prix "Cinéma Tout Ecran" award-winning Little Criminals, the Emmy-nominated Weapons of Mass Distraction, starring Ben Kingsley and Gabriel Byrne, and the CBC movie Intelligence. His episodic credits include Da Vinci's Inquest, Legacy, The Handler, Road to Avonlea, Due South, X-Files, Warehouse 13 and pilots for Bull, Miss Miami and Zoe Busiek: Wildcard and Intelligence. His more recent television work includes; Common Law, Burn Notice, Graceland, Person of Interest, Arrow and The Flash.

=== Radio show ===
In 2018, Surjik launched his own radio show and podcast on Brigade-Radio-One called Field Report with Ethan Dettenmaier.

== Filmography ==
Short film

- Shipbuilder (1985)

Feature film

- Wayne's World 2 (1993)
- I Want Candy (2007)

TV series

Year	Title	Director	Producer	Notes
1990–1991	Maniac Mansion	Yes	No	2 episodes
1990–1993	The Kids in the Hall	Yes	No	Film segments, 24 episodes
1991	Max Glick	Yes	No	Episode "Odd Couple"
1992–1995	Road to Avonlea	Yes	No	5 episodes
1994	The X-Files	Yes	No	Episode: "Excelsis Dei"
1998–2005	Da Vinci's Inquest	Yes	No	10 episodes
1999	Due South	Yes	No	Episode: "A Likely Story"
1999	Legacy	Yes	No	2 episodes
2000–2001	Bull	Yes	No	2 episodes
2001	Soul Food	Yes	No	Episode: "The Root"
2002	The American Embassy	Yes	No	Episode: "China Cup"
2002	Miss Miami	Yes	No	TV Pilot
2003	Wild Card	Yes	No	Episode: "Pilot"
2003–2004	The Handler	Yes	No	2 episodes
2005	Terminal City	Yes	No	2 episodes
2005–2006	Da Vinci's City Hall	Yes	No	2 episodes
2005–2007	Intelligence	Yes	Co-producer	8 episodes
2006	Monk	Yes	No	Episodes: "Mr. Monk Bumps His Head" and "Mr. Monk Can't See a Thing"
2007-2010	Psych	Yes	No	7 episodes
2007–2013	Burn Notice	Yes	Co-executive	10 episodes
2008–2009	Flashpoint	Yes	No	3 episodes
2009	The Listener	Yes	No	2 episodes
2009	Eureka	Yes	No	Episode: "Shower the People"
2009–2011	Warehouse 13	Yes	Yes	6 episodes; Also supervising producer of 13 episodes
2010	Shattered	Yes	No	2 episodes
2010	The Good Guys	Yes	No	2 episodes
2011	No Ordinary Family	Yes	No	Episode: "No Ordinary Proposal"
2012	Common Law	Yes	Co-executive	2 episodes
2012–2016	Person of Interest	Yes	No	7 episodes
2013	The Blacklist	Yes	No	Episode: "General Ludd"
2014	Reckless	Yes	No	Episode: "Stand Your Ground"
2014	Arrow	Yes	No	Episode: "Corto Maltese"
2014–2015	Graceland	Yes	No	2 episodes
2015	The Flash	Yes	No	Episode: "Fallout"
2015–2016	The Romeo Section	Yes	Executive	2 episodes
2015–2018	Daredevil	Yes	No	4 episodes
2015–2019	Jessica Jones	Yes	No	3 episodes
2016	Bates Motel	Yes	No	Episode: "Unfaithful"
2016–2018	Luke Cage	Yes	No	2 episodes
2017	Designated Survivor	Yes	No	Episode: "Warriors"
2017	Hand of God	Yes	No	Episode: "What Do You Hear..."
2017	The Defenders	Yes	No	Episode: "Ashes, Ashes"
2017	The Punisher	Yes	No	Episode: "Memento Mori"
2017–2018	Iron Fist	Yes	No	2 episodes
2017–2019	The Gifted	Yes	No	3 episodes
2018	Six	Yes	No	Episode: "Dua"
2018	Runaways	Yes	No	Episode: "Earth Angel"
2018–2019	Lost in Space	Yes	No	2 episodes
2019	Instinct	Yes	No	Episode: "Stay Gold"
2019	See	Yes	No	Episode: "Silk"
2019–2022	FBI	Yes	No	5 episodes
2019–2020	The Umbrella Academy	Yes	No	4 episodes
2021	The Witcher	Yes	No	2 episodes
2022	Reacher	Yes	No	1 episode
2022–2024	Law & Order: Organized Crime	Yes	No	3 episodes
2023	FUBAR	Yes	No	2 episodes
2025–2026	Chicago P.D.	Yes	No	2 episodes
2025	The Abandons	Yes	No	Episode: "Piety and Rage"
2026	Elsbeth	Yes	No	3 episodes

TV movies

- Mary Silliman's War (1994)
- Grand Larceny (1995)
- Long Island Fever (1995)
- Little Criminals (1995)
- Weapons of Mass Distraction (1997)
- Tripping the Wire: A Stephen Tree Mystery (2005)

Acting roles

Year	Title	Role	Notes
1990	The Kids in the Hall	Prisoner	Episode 5
1993	Wayne's World 2	Director	Uncredited
1999	The City	Garston	Episode "Shadows"
