= The Paradox of Intermediate Transactions =

- Fargo episode
- Episode no.: Season 5 Episode 3
- Directed by: Donald Murphy
- Written by: Noah Hawley
- Cinematography by: Bella Gonzales
- Editing by: Christopher Nelson
- Production code: XFO05003
- Original air date: November 28, 2023
- Running time: 43 minutes

Guest appearances
- Rebecca Liddiard as Karen Tillman; Brendan Fletcher as Gun World Clerk; Clare Coulter as Mama Munch; Sally Bishop as Brandy; Erik Ermantrout as Pace; Stephen Joffe as Lemley

Episode chronology
← Previous "Trials and Tribulations"	Next → "Insolubilia"
- Fargo (season 5)

"The Paradox of Intermediate Transactions" is the third episode of the fifth season of the American anthology dark–crime drama television series Fargo. It is the 44th overall episode of the series and was written by series creator Noah Hawley and directed by Donald Murphy. It originally aired on FX on November 28, 2023.

The season is set in Minnesota and North Dakota in the fall of 2019, and follows Dorothy "Dot" Lyon, a seemingly typical Midwestern housewife living in Scandia, Minnesota, whose mysterious past comes back to haunt her after she lands in hot water with the authorities. One of those authorities is North Dakota Sheriff Roy Tillman, who has been searching for Dot for a long time. In the episode, Roy instructs Gator in kidnapping Dot, who has prepared herself for any potential danger. Meanwhile, Munch recovers after his escape, while Witt decides to check on Donald Ireland's death.

According to Nielsen Media Research, the episode was seen by an estimated 0.494 million household viewers and gained a 0.08 ratings share among adults aged 18–49. The episode received critical acclaim, with critics praising the performances, writing, ambition and directing.

== Plot ==
Roy (Jon Hamm) meets with Gator (Joe Keery) at the gas station to see the corpse of Gator's partner. He helps him with a plan in ditching the body, while they will set out in finding Munch (Sam Spruell). Roy returns to his ranch, reuniting with his wife Karen (Rebecca Liddiard) and having a talk with her visiting father, Odin, leader of a right-wing militia partnered with Roy. At bedtime, Roy declines Karen's sexual advances, and imagines seeing Dot (Juno Temple) while smoking a marijuana cigarette.

Dot makes plans for Halloween, switching around the street signs in the neighborhood and designing "zombie killer" costumes for her and Scotty (Sienna King). In Bismarck, an elderly woman (Clare Coulter) arrives home to find Munch sitting on a rocking chair, proclaiming, "I live here now." In a flashback to late-medieval Wales, Bryn Glas (Ole Munch) is questioned for committing a sin. The man is allowed to consume a meal representing the dead man's sins, earning forgiveness to the dead man. He is given two coins and leaves the establishment, as the crowd now fears his presence. Back in present day, the elderly woman allows Munch to stay at the house.

Dot and Wayne (David Rysdahl) go to purchase firearms, but the clerk (Brendan Fletcher) warns them that state law requires a one-week waiting period. Witt (Lamorne Morris) returns to work to check for clues on Donald Ireland, stumbling upon Gator stealing from the evidence room. Gator evades Witt's suspicions and walks away. Witt investigates Gator's background, finding his history of corruption and his connection to Roy. Indira (Richa Moorjani) and her boss, Captain Muscavage (Paul McGillion), ask Lorraine (Jennifer Jason Leigh) for cooperation in their investigation, but she actually wants the case to go away. After they leave, she assigns Danish (Dave Foley) to employ special security on her family and to observe Dot's activities.

Roy tasks Gator with leading a team in kidnapping Dot during Halloween night, when everyone is wearing masks and they can operate without drawing attention. As the Lyons prepare to leave, Dot is called by Roy, who slowly sings "Nadine" before she hangs up. While Roy stays at the Tillman ranch, Munch performs a ritual in a shed, covering himself in goat's blood and chanting in Latin. Gator and his team struggle in finding Dot's house due to the change in street signs. As Dot and her family return home, she notices their van in the street. Gator, wearing a Jack Skellington mask, stares at her, and they exchange a look before Dot enters the house. Back at the ranch, Karen puts her two children to bed, unaware that a bloodied Munch has entered the house.

== Production ==
=== Development ===
In October 2023, it was reported that the third episode of the season would be titled "The Paradox of Intermediate Transactions", and was to be written by series creator Noah Hawley, and directed by Donald Murphy. This was Hawley's 37th writing credit, and Murphy's first directing credit.

=== Writing ===
Regarding Munch's nature, Noah Hawley explained, "What I wanted to explore with the Munch character really was this idea of debt and sin eating and this idea of what the rich make the poor do. And part of what the rich do to the poor is they make them feel like it's their fault they're poor, and that if these poor people have to borrow money from us, it makes them less than. And then we impose this morality on them that they can't pay it back." Sam Spruell also gave his interpretation of the sin-eating sequence, "Either [Munch's] ancestor or he himself was shaped by a damnation. Due to his poverty and social standing, he had to eat the sins of someone who had a higher social standing and more financial freedom. He's kind of trapped in a cycle. He can't escape sin. It's a metaphor, if you like, for poverty and some crime that can come with it. Living below the bread line as an underclass. That's all in my creation of Ole Munch."

Hawley also drew comparisons between Gator Tillman and Jack Skellington, the protagonist in The Nightmare Before Christmas. He said, "[Jack is] someone who, much like Joe Keery's character, is trying to be something he's not, which is an evil, scary dude when, really, he's a softie." He added, "There's just too much pressure on Gator, and he's always trying to live up to those expectations while at the same time, deep down, with a different father, he would have been a kind soul. It's the sins of the father, right? And whether Joe's character is going to be able to get out from under the burden of — and reject — what's toxic about his lineage."

== Reception ==
=== Viewers ===
In its original American broadcast, "The Paradox of Intermediate Transactions" was seen by an estimated 0.494 million household viewers and gained a 0.08 ratings share among adults aged 18–49, according to Nielsen Media Research. This means that 0.08 percent of all households with televisions watched the episode. This was a 58% increase in viewership from the previous episode, which was watched by 0.311 million viewers with a 0.08 in the 18-49 demographics.

=== Critical reviews ===
"The Paradox of Intermediate Transactions" received critical acclaim. Tom Philip of The A.V. Club gave the episode an "A" grade and wrote, "In an episode filled with sin-eating, blood magic, and glimpses beyond the veil, Fargo seems to be asking: What is superstition, what is ignorance, what is denial, but simply new versions of ancient rituals designed to grant us the illusion of power over forces beyond our mortal control?"

Alan Sepinwall wrote, "while there's a lot of other stuff to enjoy here, including Dot once again preparing to repel home invaders, Kevin McCallister-style, the Welsh interlude is the piece that's stuck with me for many weeks since I first watched it." Keith Phipps of Vulture gave the episode a 4 star rating out of 5 and wrote, "Things are getting tense, aren't they? In some ways, this feels like an end-of-the-season episode, rather than one arriving before the halfway point. Can Fargo sustain this level of suspense through the end of this fifth season? That too remains a mystery, but the clues suggest 'yes.'"

Scott Tobias of The New York Times wrote, "The episode ends on the sort of cliffhanger that leaves you wishing for back-to-back hours like the premiere. Gator and his crack team of masked yahoos have found Dot, despite their confusion over the mixed-up street signs, and Munch has reverted to a scary, primal state to stalk his prey. One sequence seems set up for folly, the other for a disturbing spasm of violence. That's a balanced Fargo diet." Alec Bojalad of Den of Geek wrote, "If it sounds like Spruell has accepted that the man we see 500 years ago is in fact Ole Munch and not one of Ole Munch's ancestors, that's because he seemingly has."

Sean T. Collins of Decider wrote, "it's positively bristling with fun ideas, images, plot developments, song choices, blatant swipes, actors enjoying themselves — all the stuff you tune into Fargo for."
