= Bramwell Tovey =

British conductor and composer (1953–2022)

Bramwell Tovey OC OM
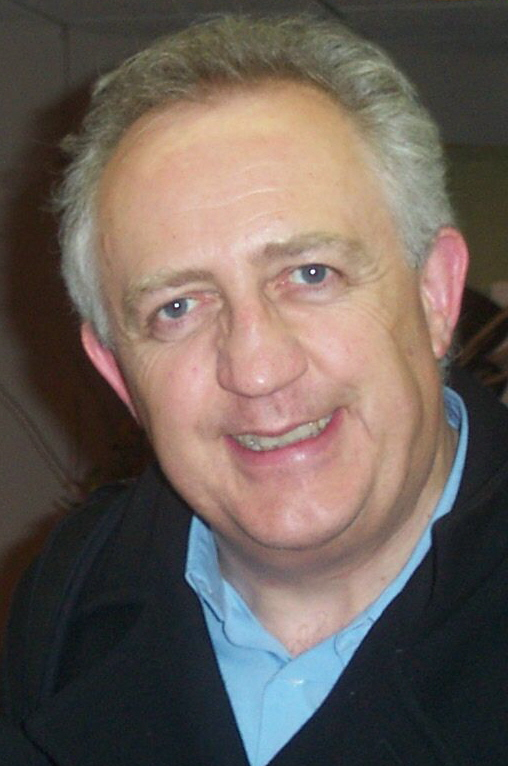
- Tovey in 2005
- Born: 11 July 1953; Ilford, Essex, England
- Died: 12 July 2022 (aged 69); Barrington, Rhode Island, US
- Education: Royal Academy of Music; University of London
- Occupations: Conductor, composer
- Website: bramwelltovey.com

Bramwell Tovey OC OM (11 July 1953 – 12 July 2022) was a British conductor and composer.

== Life and career ==
Tovey was educated at Ilford County High School, the Royal Academy of Music and the University of London. His formal music education was as a pianist and composer. Whilst at the Royal Academy, he also became a tuba player, studying with John Fletcher. During his student years he conducted several broadcasts on the BBC, and also played in the London Symphony Orchestra at the Salzburg Festival.

Tovey was appointed a staff conductor of London Festival Ballet at the age of 22, working with Léonide Massine on a production of Parade, Ronald Hynd on Nutcracker and Sanguine Fan and with Rudolf Nureyev on Romeo and Juliet. In 1978 he became Music Director of Scottish Ballet, conducting Peter Darrell's major ballets including Cheri and Five Rückert Songs (with Janet Baker). From 1984 to 1988 he was Principal Conductor of Sadler's Wells Royal Ballet. During this period he also conducted several British orchestras and appeared as pianist in Elite Syncopations. Tovey conducted the first season of the revived D'Oyly Carte Opera Company in 1988. Between 1989 and 2001, he was the music director of the Winnipeg Symphony Orchestra, and was instrumental in establishing the city's annual New Music Festival, which began in 1992.

Tovey became music director of the Vancouver Symphony Orchestra (VSO) in September 2000. His initial contract was renewed in December 2004, and extended again in January 2010 to 2015. In November 2013, the VSO announced the further extension of Tovey's contract through the 2017–2018 season, and the scheduled conclusion of his music directorship of the VSO at that time. Tovey was scheduled to take the title of VSO music director emeritus with the 2018–2019 season, the VSO's 100th season.

In December 2009, Tovey and the VSO rejected an invitation to play at the 2010 Winter Olympics opening ceremony in Vancouver, after the Vancouver Organizing Committee requested that the orchestra pre-record music that other musicians and a different conductor would mime to at the televised event. Tovey remarked that the plan was "dishonest" and "fraudulent."

Tovey was music director of the Luxembourg Philharmonic Orchestra from 2002 to 2006, during which time he led it on tours to Europe, the Far East and to the eastern United States; in 2005 he conducted them in the world premiere of Penderecki's 8th Symphony. In November 2017, the BBC Concert Orchestra announced the appointment of Tovey as its next principal conductor, effective January 2018, with an initial contract of 5 years.

Tovey conducted the "Summertime Classics" series of concerts with the New York Philharmonic since the inception of the series in the summer of 2004, after his 2001 subscription debut with the orchestra, through the conclusion of the series in 2014. Tovey was appointed Artistic Director of the National Youth Brass Band of Great Britain and conducted his first course in April 2006. He had a long-standing affiliation with the Fodens Brass Band and conducted a CD of his compositions with the Foden's Band, released in May 2009. In March 2008, Tovey was named the next principal guest conductor of the Los Angeles Philharmonic's Hollywood Bowl summer concerts.

Tovey was also known as a composer. His compositions include a Cello Concerto (premiered in Winnipeg in January 2001), and a work for a large choir and brass band, 'Requiem for a Charred Skull', which in 2003 was awarded a Juno for Classical Composition of the Year. Tovey also composed the film score, recorded by the VSO, for Richard Bell's film Eighteen. The full score was released on iTunes. Tovey was nominated for a Genie Award (Canada's Academy Award), in tandem with Bell, for a song in the film called "In a Heartbeat", which was performed by Thea Gill. On commission from the 2005 British Open Brass Band Championship, Tovey composed 'The Night to Sing' as the test piece, inspired by the celebrations of VE Day, 1945. In 2007, Calgary Opera commissioned a new opera from Tovey, titled The Inventor and premiered by Calgary Opera in January 2011.

Tovey was involved with numerous television and radio programmes related to music. He conducted Cinderella with Scottish Ballet for ITV and Daphnis et Chloé for Channel 4 and two television programmes with the BBC Scottish Symphony Orchestra. He has been the recipient of four honorary doctorates – Winnipeg (1994), Manitoba (1999), Kwantlen University College (2004) and the University of British Columbia. He was an honorary Fellow of the Royal Conservatory of Music in Toronto (2006) and a Fellow of the Royal Academy of Music in London, England (2006). In October 2016, Tovey made his stage debut in an opera, taking the speaking role of The Impresario in the City Opera of Vancouver premiere of the comedy 'The Lost Operas of Mozart' at Christ Church Cathedral. In September 2017, Tovey took up the post of Director of Orchestral Activities at the Boston University School of Music. In September 2018, Tovey became artistic advisor to the Rhode Island Philharmonic Orchestra. In December 2021, the Rhode Island Philharmonic Orchestra announced a change in Tovey's title with the ensemble to principal conductor and artistic director, and in parallel an extension of his contract through August 2026.

Tovey first guest-conducted the Sarasota Orchestra in the 2019–2020 season, prior to the COVID-19 pandemic. In August 2021, the Sarasota Orchestra announced the appointment of Tovey as its next music director, effective with the 2022–2023 season, with an initial tenure of four years. He was scheduled to take the title of music director-designate on 1 September 2021.

== Personal life ==
Tovey was married three times. His first marriage in 1982 was to the British oboist Jane Marshall. His second marriage, which also ended in divorce, resulted in a son, Ben, once guitarist for the metal band Rise To Remain. Tovey and his third wife had two daughters. Verena de Neovel was his partner at the time of his death.

He died of a sarcoma on 12 July 2022 at his home in Barrington, Rhode Island, one day after his 69th birthday.

== Works ==
| Premiere date | Title | Instrumentation | Details |
|---|---|---|---|
| 1979 | Cinderella (Rossini, arr. Tovey) | Orchestra | Choreography by Peter Darrell Premiered at His Majesty's Theatre, (Aberdeen, Scotland) Over 200 performances |
| 1981 | The Three Graces | Piano trio | Premiered at the Dumfries and Galloway Festival, Scotland |
| 1986 | The Snow Queen (ballet arranged from songs, piano works and The Fair at Sorochyntsi by Modest Mussorgsky as well as fragments from Mussorgsky's sketchbooks) | Orchestra, solo soprano | Choreography by David Bintley Premiered by Sadler's Wells Royal Ballet with Tovey conducting Over 300 performances to date |
| 1986 | Coventry Variations (based on "The Coventry Carol") | Brass | Premiered at Derngate Theatre (Northampton, England) with Tovey conducting |
| 1992 | Party Pieces | 12-piece ensemble | Premiered at the Winnipeg Symphony Orchestra's New Music Festival |
| 1995 | The Bardfield Ayre | Brass band | Commissioned and premiered by the Hannaford Band, with Tovey conducting |
| 1997 | A Fistful of Gilders | Narrator, children's chorus and orchestra | Premiered by the Assiniboine South Youth Choir and the Winnipeg Symphony Orchestra, with Tovey conducting |
| 1999 | Concerto for viola and orchestra | Viola and orchestra | Premiered by Dan Scholz (viola) and the Winnipeg Symphony Orchestra, with Tovey conducting. |
| 2000 | Concerto for cello and orchestra | Cello and orchestra | Commissioned by Bill and Shirley Loewen Premiered at the Winnipeg Symphony Orchestra's New Music Festival by Paul Marleyn (cello) and the WSO, with Tovey conducting |
| 2003 | Requiem for a Charred Skull | Large choir and brass brand | Recorded by the Amadeus Choir and the Hannaford Band in Toronto |
| 2003 | Magnificat | Soprano, chorus, children's chorus, brass and percussion | Commissioned by the Hannaford Band with the assistance of the Laidlaw Foundation Premiered by Laura Whalen (soprano), Canadian Children's Opera Chorus and the Hannaford Band, with Richard Bradshaw conducting |
| 2004 | Santa Barbara Sonata | Brass quintet | Commissioned by Music Academy of the West for Canadian Brass Premiered by Canadian Brass |
| 2004 | Manhattan Music | Brass quintet and orchestra | Premiered by the Vancouver Symphony Orchestra and Canadian Brass, with Tovey conducting |
| 2005 | Eighteen (film soundtrack) | Voice and orchestra | Recorded by Vancouver Symphony and Chor Leoni with Tovey conducting Song "In a Heartbeat" nominated for 2007 Genie Award for "Best Achievement in Music – Original Song" |
| 2005 | The Night to Sing | Brass band | Commissioned by the British Open Brass Band Championship as the test-piece |
| April 2006 | Urban Cabaret (renamed The Lincoln Tunnel Cabaret) | Solo trombone, brass and percussion | Commissioned for and premiered by the National Youth Brass Band of Great Britain and Joe Alessi, principal trombone of the New York Philharmonic, with Tovey conducting Recording released in 2007 |
| January 2007 | Pictures in the Smoke | Piano, brass band and percussion (Also version for piano, orchestral brass and percussion – see below) | Premiered at the Royal Northern College of Music (Manchester, England), with Tovey playing piano and conducting |
| May 2007 | Nine Daies Wonder | Brass band and violin | Commissioned and premiered by the Hannaford Band with Mark Fewer (violin) and Tovey conducting |
| September 2007 | Fugitive Voices | 2 sopranos, mezzo-soprano and string septet | Commissioned by Sweetwater Festival, Ontario |
| September 2007 | Manhattan Music (revised version) | Brass quintet and wind orchestra | Commissioned by Canadian Brass and premiered at the Eastman School of Music with Mark Scatterday conducting |
| October 2007 | Echoes of Jericho | 4 horns, 3 trumpets, 3 trombones, tuba, percussion and timpani | Composed for and premiered at the 10th Anniversary of the Chan Centre of the Performing Arts in British Columbia Premiere by the Vancouver Symphony Orchestra brass section and the University of British Columbia Orchestra, with Tovey conducting. |
| January 2008 | Pictures in the Smoke (revised version) | Orchestral brass, percussion and solo piano | North American premiere took place in January 2008 as part of the Vancouver Symphony Orchestra's new music series, with Tovey playing and conducting |
| July 2008 | Urban Runway | Strings, harps, piano/celesta, percussion, and timpani | Los Angeles Philharmonic co-commission with the New York Philharmonic. First performed 4 July 2008 with New York Philharmonic, Tovey conducting. LA premiere a week later at Hollywood Bowl |
| January 2011 | The Inventor | Full-length opera with voices and instrumentation | Calgary Opera Commission. World premiere Calgary Opera with Calgary Philharmonic 29 January 2011 Recorded live with Vancouver Symphony, UBC Opera and original cast, June 2012 |

Cultural offices
| Preceded by David Shallon | Music Director, Luxembourg Philharmonic Orchestra; 2002–2006 | Succeeded by Emmanuel Krivine |
| Preceded by Keith Lockhart | Principal Conductor, BBC Concert Orchestra; 2018–2022 | Succeeded by Anna-Maria Helsing |
