= Stanley and His Monster =

DC Comics comic book series

- Stanley Dover and his monstrous companion, with his grandfather, Stanley Dover, Sr. on the background of a page of Green Arrow: Secret Files & Origins #1 (December 2002); art by Phil Hester & Ande Parks.

Publication information
- Publisher: DC Comics
- First appearance: The Fox and the Crow #95 (January 1966)
- Created by: Arnold Drake and Win Mortimer

In-story information
- Alter ego: Stanley Dover
- Team affiliations: Justice League
Stanley and His Monster
- Stanley and His Monster #109 (May 1968), the debut issue, featuring several supporting characters. Cover art by Bob Oskner (penciler).
Publication information
- Publisher: DC Comics
- Schedule: Monthly
- Format: Ongoing series
- Genre: Humor, Fantasy
- Publication date: May 1968 – May 1993
- No. of issues: 4
- Main character(s): Stanley Dover; The Beast With No Name a.k.a. S.N. Massachusetts a.k.a. Spot; Shaugnessy Poltroon; Schnitzel; Napoleon's ghost Marcia
Creative team
- Written by: Arnold Drake (vol 2.): Phil Foglio
- Artist(s): Win Mortimer (vol 2.): Phil Foglio

Stanley and His Monster is an American comic book humor feature and later series from DC Comics, about a boy who has a monster as his companion instead of a dog. Created by writer Arnold Drake and artist Winslow Mortimer as a backup feature in the talking animal comic The Fox and the Crow #95 (January 1966), it went to its own 1960s title and a 1990s revival limited series.

== Publication history ==
The backup feature "Stanley and His Monster" appeared in DC Comics' comic The Fox and the Crow #95–108, upon which the series became Stanley and His Monster from #109–112 (May–Nov. 1968), the final issue.

The characters' next major appearance was in a 1993 four-issue mini-series, Stanley and His Monster vol. 2, by writer-artist Phil Foglio, who had previously done their origin in Secret Origins #48 (April 1990). This humorous adventure series, revealing the monster as a demon from Hell who had turned good and was cast out by Lucifer, incorporated and parodied elements of DC Comics' mature-reader Vertigo imprint in a lighthearted, general-audience fashion. Among the characters who appeared are Remiel, Duma, the Phantom Stranger, and the John Constantine-like Ambrose Bierce.

The characters appeared in 1999's Conjurers, a limited, three-issue, Elseworlds series. The run was written by Chuck Dixon, et al., and drawn by Eduardo Barreto, et al.. The series was later collected in the compendium, Elseworlds: Justice League, Vol. 3. Wise-cracking, self-possessed Stanley appears to be in his mid-teens. His monster is said to have arrived on earth having been sent to retrieve a device stolen from the monster's people ("the Elders") a million years prior, and with which the "Father of Magic" (i.e., the thief) created the first generation of humans possessed of magical abilities. At the same time, he removed all evil from the monster. In the present, their magical descendants now comprise ten percent of the world's population. The crisis to be overcome is that the Elders still want their device back and want the Father of Magic brought to them so that they may consume his soul.

The title characters returned in 2001 as supporting players in the Green Arrow series, written by filmmaker Kevin Smith, but in a much darker tone than any previous appearance, and with Stanley by now a young teenager. They next appeared in the 2005–06 miniseries Infinite Crisis, where, in issue #6, they are part of a gathering of supernatural characters attempting to summon the mystical spirit of vengeance, the Spectre, for aid.

The characters next appeared from April to July 2011 in Batman/Superman: Sorcerer Kings as members of a mostly magical Justice League in a dystopian future. Stanley appeared as a young adult.

== Fictional character biographies ==
Stanley Dover is a six-year-old boy who finds his monster companion in a sewer. In a twist on monster lore, the creature – a tall, bulky, pink-furred behemoth with small tusks – proves as scared of the world as the world is of it. The monster, whom Stanley names Spot, comes home to live with the boy, with many hijinks ensuing. These occasionally include the bickering leprechaun Shaugnessy Poltroon, a gremlin named Schnitzel (sold to the Dovers as toys in issue #99), the ghost of French emperor Napoleon (introduced in issue #97) and teenaged babysitter Marcia. Comedian Jerry Lewis once visited them as well (issue #110).

The monster, unbeknownst to Stanley, is in fact a demon known as "The Beast With No Name", banished from Hell by Lucifer for being "too nice" for Hell. Lucifer had hoped that frightened and bigoted humans would embitter the Beast and make him accept his destiny as a being of evil, a plan that almost succeeded. However, when Stanley meets the monster and takes him in as his friend, the monster chooses the path of good and continues living on Earth. The first name the Beast took was "Massachusetts", because the Massachusett were the first people who were kind to him, but since the closest Stanley could struggle out was "Mathatoothis", readers were encouraged to send in a new name that Stanley could say.

Stanley's middle-class parents, Mitch and Sheila, firmly believe their child's companion to be imaginary until eventually learning otherwise. They initially want the monster gone, but after becoming aware of the creature's good nature decide that in a world of superheroes, magic, and alien invasions, they decide that having a benign demon companion for their son seems rather normal and allow him to stay.

Years later, it is revealed that other arcane forces have played into the monster's arrival on Earth (events of this telling of the story fundamentally invalidate any earlier versions, to the extent that tying them together becomes impossible). The monster had accidentally been bonded to Stanley by Stanley's demon-worshiping grandfather, also named Stanley Dover.

Some time later, Stanley and his monster appear with the several other of the world's magic users to help summon the Spectre during the Infinite Crisis.

Stanley and his monster also appeared in a possible future/alternate timeline as members of the Justice League. With Aquaman, Scream Queen, Klarion the Witch Boy, Traci Thirteen, Batman, and Superman, they fight to prevent an Armageddon of magical proportions.

A version of Stanley and his Monster appears on Earth-13 in the Tavern of Mystery.

== In other media ==
- Stanley Dover and Spot appear as character summons in Scribblenauts Unmasked: A DC Comics Adventure.
