= Star City Slayer =

Publication information
- Publisher: DC Comics
- First appearance: Green Arrow (vol. 3) #1 (April 2001)
- Created by: Kevin Smith; Phil Hester

In-story information
- Alter ego: Stanley Dover Sr.
- Species: Homo magi (current); Human (originally)
- Abilities: Occult master

Star City Slayer (Stanley Dover) is a supervillain appearing in American comic books published by DC Comics. He is the grandfather of Stanley Dover who is named after him, though he is not named Stanley Dover Sr.

Brendan Fletcher portrayed a variation of the character in the seventh season of the Arrowverse television series Arrow.

== Fictional character biography ==
The Star City Slayer is first seen feeding a vial of blood to a creature who is imprisoned in a glass cage underground. Stanley Dover later buys the Star City Youth Center, with Mia Dearden as his first employee. Dover explains to Mia his believe that Oliver Queen has missed the last 10 years of his life following his resurrection.

Oliver Queen finds himself at the house of Stanley Dover, who knocks him unconscious and brings him down to the basement. Upon regaining consciousness, Oliver learns that Dover is the Star City Slayer as he gestures to an imprisoned child dressed as a monster.

It is revealed that Dover Sr. had summoned the Beast in order to use it to grant him immortality using the Magdaline Grimoire, but inadvertently bound the Beast to his grandson Stanley Dover, who he was babysitting at the time. After realizing what had happened, Dover locked Stanley in a large glass container and tormented him in an attempt to bring back the Beast back. Eventually abandoning his original plans to search for the Beast, Dover Sr. decides to transfer his soul into Green Arrow, who lost his soul following his resurrection. Dover intends to gain access to the Watchtower monitoring systems to find the Beast. However, Green Arrow makes contact with his soul in Heaven and reunites with it. The Beast kills and eats Dover Sr., erasing Stanley's memories of his imprisonment.

== Powers and abilities ==
The Star City Slayer is a master of the occult.

== In other media ==
Stanley Dover appears in the seventh season of Arrow, portrayed by Brendan Fletcher. This version is a mentally unstable serial killer who is held in Slabside Maximum Security Prison and puts on a timid, weak facade. While imprisoned in Slabside, Dover quickly befriends Oliver Queen, who frequently defends Dover from the other inmates. After discovering Dover's true personality and his framing of Ben Turner for the stabbing of a prison guard, Queen abandons Dover.
