= Brendan Fletcher =

Canadian actor (born 1981)

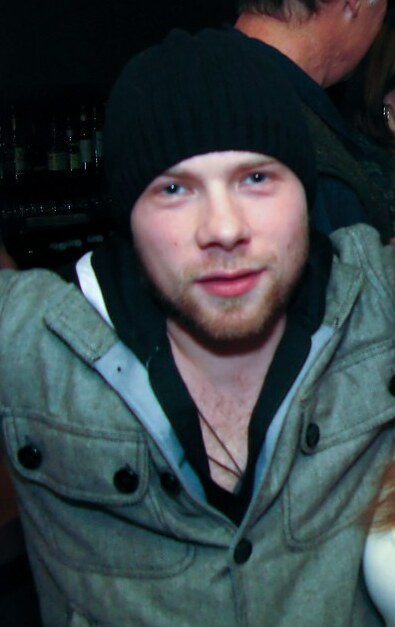
- Fletcher at a screening of Rampage in 2009
- Born: December 15, 1981 (age 44); Comox Valley, British Columbia, Canada
- Occupation: Actor
- Years active: 1995–present

Brendan Fletcher (born December 15, 1981) is a Canadian actor. He first gained recognition as a child actor, being nominated for a Gemini Award for his acting debut in the made-for-television film Little Criminals and winning a Leo Award for his role in the TV series Caitlin's Way. He subsequently won the Genie Award for Best Leading Actor for John Greyson's The Law of Enclosures, and was nominated for Best Actor in a Supporting Role for Turning Paige.

Fletcher is known for playing troubled, eccentric, or unhinged characters, and is considered a character actor. He has appeared in high-profile films like Tideland, Freddy vs. Jason, Citizen Gangster, The Revenant and Violent Night. He had the leading role in Uwe Boll's Rampage trilogy, playing mass murderer Bill Williamson. He has also appeared in television series such as Smallville, Supernatural, The Pacific, Rogue, Hell on Wheels, Siren, Arrow, and Superman & Lois.

== Early life ==
Fletcher was born on December 15, 1981, in Comox Valley, British Columbia, Canada.

== Career ==
His acting debut was in 1995 in the CBC television movie Little Criminals, earning him a Gemini Award nomination. His filmography includes Tideland, Freddy vs. Jason, Ginger Snaps 2: Unleashed, Ginger Snaps Back: The Beginning, The Five Senses, Air Bud, Rampage 1-3, Eighteen, and Law of Enclosures. He also played Stirling Patterson (nickname: Stink) in The Adventures of Shirley Holmes, appeared as Eric Anderson in Caitlin's Way and as Max in the Supernatural episode "Nightmare" and he appeared in the season 8 episode "Injustice" of Smallville as Rudy Jones aka The Parasite. He portrayed PFC Bill Leyden in the HBO miniseries The Pacific, which received a number of prestigious accolades including a Peabody Award and eight Primetime Emmys.

Fletcher has made a number of collaborations with director Uwe Boll starting with his 2002 film Heart of America, and portraying mass murderer Bill Williamson in the director's controversial Rampage trilogy. He had a recurring guest role on the Western drama series Hell on Wheels, and appeared in a supporting role on the crime drama Cardinal. He appeared in the critically lauded 2015 Western film The Revenant alongside Leonardo DiCaprio and Tom Hardy.

Fletcher has received numerous accolades for his work, having received a total of 4 Gemini Award nominations, 4 Leo Award nominations, and 2 Genie Award nominations. He has won 2 Geminis, 1 Leo, and 1 Genie.

In September 2018, Fletcher portrayed Stanley Dover in the seventh season of Arrow.

In 2021, Fletcher portrayed Arlen Scarlett in the TV series Joe Pickett.

== Filmography ==
=== Film ===
Year	Title	Role	Notes
1997	Keeping the Promise	Matthew Hallowell	
1997	Air Bud	Larry Willingham	Nominated- Young Artist Award for Best Supporting Actor in a Feature Film
1997	Trucks	Logan	
1999	The Five Senses	Rupert	
1999	Jimmy Zip	Jimmy Zip	
1999	My Father's Angel	Vlada	
1999	Rollercoaster	Stick	Vancouver Film Critics Circle Award for Best Actor in a Canadian Film; Copper Wing for Best Ensemble (Phoenix Film Festival)
1999	Summer's End	Hunter Baldwin	
2000	Trixie	CD Thief	
2000	The Law of Enclosures	Henry	Genie Award for Best Performance by an Actor in a Leading Role
2001	The Unsaid	Troy Pasternak	
2001	De grot	Arthur Nussbaum	
2001	Turning Paige	Jeff Simms	Nominated- Genie Award for Best Performance by an Actor in a Supporting Role
2002	Touch	Narrator / Victim	Short film
2002	Heart of America	Ricky Herman	
2003	The Big Charade	Russ	Short film
2003	21st Century Scott	Scott's Buddy	Short film
2003	Freddy vs. Jason	Mark Davis	
2004	Ginger Snaps 2: Unleashed	Jeremy	
2004	The Final Cut	Michael	
2004	Ginger Snaps Back: The Beginning	Finn	
2004	Everyone	Dylan	Nominated- Leo Award for Best Male Supporting Performance - Feature Drama
2004	Death Valley	Johnny	
2004	Deadly Friends	Andrew Leyshon-Hughes	
2004	Lucky Stars	Asaf	
2005	Alone in the Dark	Cabbie	
2005	Paper Moon Affair	Hart Turner	Nominated- Leo Award for Best Male Performance - Feature Drama
2005	Tideland	Dickens	
2005	Eighteen	Jason Anders	
2006	RV	Howie	
2006	Black Eyed Dog	David	
2007	88 Minutes	Johnny D'Franco	
2007	BloodRayne 2: Deliverance	Muller	
2007	The Green Chain	Dylan Hendrix	
2008	The Onion Movie	White Black Guy Tim	
2009	Rampage	Bill Williamson	Also co-producer
2010	Badass Thieves	Ethan	Short film
2011	Blubberella	Nathaniel Gregor	
2011	BloodRayne: The Third Reich	Nathaniel Gregor	
2011	American Animal	James	
2011	Citizen Gangster	Willie "The Clown" Jackson	
2013	Suddenly	Deputy Anderson	
2013	13 Eerie	Josh	
2014	Rampage: Capital Punishment	Bill Williamson	
2014	Altergeist	Jason	
2014	Leprechaun: Origins	David	
2015	The Revenant	Fryman	
2016	Rampage: President Down	Bill Williamson	Also writer and executive producer
2016	Lost Solace	Rob	
2017	Mercs	Ratt	Short film
2018	Braven	Weston	
2018	Open 24 Hours	Bobby	
2018	Distorted	Russell Curran	
2018	Night Hunter	Simon Stulls / Simon's Twin	
2018	F**k You All: The Uwe Boll Story	Himself	Documentary film
2019	The Road	Matt	Short film
2019	Brotherhood	Arthur Lambden	
2021	Dangerous	Massey	
2022	Violent Night	Krampus	
2025	Normal	Keith	

=== Television ===
Year	Title	Role	Notes
1995	Little Criminals	Des	Television film Nominated- Gemini Award for Best Leading Performance by an Actor in a Dramatic Program
1995	The Marshal	Lincoln 'Link' Fetter	Episode: "Gone Fishing"
1996	Dead Ahead	Doug Loch	Television film
1996	Goosebumps	Grady Tucker	Season 1, Episodes 18-19, “The Werewolf of Fever Swamp - Parts 1 & 2”
1996-2000	The Adventures of Shirley Holmes	Sterling 'Stink' Patterson	Recurring role; Seasons 1-4
1997	Keeping the Promise	Matthew Hallowell	Television film
1997	Contagious	Brian	Television film
1997	High Stakes	Sean	Television film
1997	Nothing Sacred	Mark	Episode: "Proofs for the Existence of God"
1997	Trucks	Logan Porter	Television film
1998	Millennium	Alex Hanes	Episode: "Anamnesis"
1998	Floating Away	Brad	Television film
1998	Welcome to Paradox	Rudy	Episode: "All Our Sins Forgotten"
1998	The Crow: Stairway to Heaven	Jesse Hickock	Episode: "Voices"
1998	Da Vinci's Inquest	William Turner	Episode: "Gabriel"
1999	Summer's End	Hunter Baldwin	Television film
1999	Family Blessings	Joey Reston	Television film
1999	Dead Man's Gun	Walter	Episode: "Bad Boys"
2000	Scorn	Derik	Television film
2000–01	Caitlin's Way	Eric Anderson	Main role; Seasons 1-2 Gemini Award for Best Performance by an Actor in a Youth Program
2001	Anatomy of a Hate Crime	Aaron McKinney	Television film
2001	Cold Squad	Will Lutz	Episode: "My So Called Death"
2001	Night Visions	Shane Watkins	Episode: "Bitter Harvest"
2001	Dice	Alasdair MacCrae	Miniseries
2001	Da Vinci's Inquest	Gary	Episode: "Be a Cruel Twist"
2002	Breaking News	Daryl Higgins	Episode: "Bad Water"
2002	100 Days in the Jungle	Bean (Neil Barber)	Television film Nominated- Gemini Award for Best Performance by a Supporting Actor in a Dramatic Program
2003	The Death and Life of Nancy Eaton	Andrew Leyshon-Hughes	Television film Gemini Award for Best Performance by a Supporting Actor in a Dramatic Program
2003	Tom Stone	Private Stevie Hasting	Episode: "It's All Fun and Games"
2003	Jake 2.0	MacP	Episode: "The Good, the Bad, and the Geeky"
2003	Tru Calling	Derek De Luca	Episode: "Star Crossed"
2004	Touching Evil	Vince	Episode: "K"
2004	The Collector	Pizza Delivery Guy / The Devil	Episode: "The Ice Skater"
2005	Tripping the Wire: A Stephen Tree Mystery	Paul Small	Television film
2005	Intelligence	Bobbie	Television film
2006	Supernatural	Max Miller	Episode: "Nightmare"
2006	Masters of Horror	Deputy Strauss	Episode: "The Damned Thing"
2006	Saved	Steve Fembley	Episode: "Code Zero"
2006	Rapid Fire	Billy	Television film
2007	CSI: Crime Scene Investigation	Lionel Dell / Mitchell Douglas	Episode: "Monster in the Box"
2008	Ogre	Stephen Chandler	Television film
2008	The Capture of the Green River Killer	Bobby	Miniseries
2009	The Listener	Taz	Episode: "A Voice in the Dark"
2009	Smallville	Parasite / Rudy Jones	Episode: "Injustice"
2009	The Guard	Owen	Episode: "Boom"
2009	Defying Gravity	Russell Zachary	Episode: "Bacon"
2009	Flashpoint	Kevin	Episode: "You Think You Know Someone"
2009	Heartland	Liam	Episode: "The Starting Gate"
2010	The Pacific	PFC Bill Leyden	Miniseries
2010	Shattered	Rick Baker	Episode: "Where's the Line?"
2010	Smoke Screen	Pat Jr.	Television film
2011	Endgame	Merritt Singer	Episode: "Opening Moves"
2012	Hannah's Law	Zechariah Stitch	Television film
2012	Ring of Fire	Samuel Janen	Miniseries
2012	Alcatraz	Joe Limerick	2 episodes
2013	Whisper of Fear	Tim	Television film
2013	King & Maxwell	Dax Walters	Episode: "Job Security"
2013	The Killing	Goldie	Recurring; Season 3
2014	Rogue	Spud	Main role; Season 2
2014	The Grim Sleeper	Morales	Television film
2014	Hell on Wheels	Dultey	Recurring role; Season 4
2014	Bates Motel	Kyle	Episode: "Shadow of a Doubt"
2014	The Haunting Hour: The Series	Seamus	Episode: "Lotsa Luck"
2014	Gracepoint	Lars Pierson	Miniseries
2017	Cardinal	Eric Fraser	Recurring role; Season 1
2017	iZombie	Zombie Truther / Spence	Recurring role; Season 3; 3 episodes
2018–19	Arrow	Stanley Dover / Star City Slayer	Recurring role (Season 7); 7 episodes
2019	Siren	Rick Marzden	Recurring role; Season 2
2021	Superman & Lois	Thaddeus Killgrave	Episode: "Haywire"
2021	Joe Pickett	Arlen Scarlett	Recurring Role
2022	Billy the Kid	George Coe	2 episodes
2023	The Last of Us	Robert	Episode: "When You're Lost in the Darkness"
2023	Fargo	Gun Store Clerk	Episode: "The Paradox of Intermediate Transactions"
2025	Reacher	Harley	3 episodes

== Awards and nominations ==
Year	Award	Category	Film	Result	Refs
1997	Gemini Awards	Best Performance by an Actor in a Leading Role in a Dramatic Program	Little Criminals	Nominated	
1997	YTV Achievement Awards	Acting		Nominated	
1998	Young Artist Award	Best Performance in a Feature Film - Supporting Young Actor	Air Bud	Nominated	
1999	YTV Achievement Awards	Acting		Won	
2000	Wine Country Film Festival	Best Actor (Tied with Tony Nardi for My Father's Angel)	My Father's Angel	Won	
2000	Young Artist Award	Best Performance in a TV Movie or Pilot - Supporting Young Actor	Summer's End	Nominated	
2001	Gemini Awards	Best Performance in a Children's or Youth Program or Series	Caitlin's Way (episode "The Easy Way")	Won	
2001	Leo Awards	Best Performance Youth or Children's Program or Series	Caitlin's Way (episode "Outlaws")	Won	
2001	Phoenix Film Festival	Copper Wing Award - Best Ensemble (Shared With: Kett Turton, Crystal Buble, Brent Glenen, Sean Amsing, David Lovgren)	Rollercoaster	Won	
2001	Vancouver Film Critics Circle Award	Best Actor in a Canadian Film	Rollercoaster	Won	
2002	Genie Award	Best Performance by an Actor in a Leading Role	The Law of Enclosures	Won	
2003	Gemini Awards	Best Performance by an Actor in a Featured Supporting Role in a Dramatic Program or Mini-Series	100 Days in the Jungle	Nominated	
2003	Genie Award	Best Performance by an Actor in a Supporting Role	Turning Paige	Nominated	
2004	Jessie Richardson Theatre Awards	Outstanding Performance By An Actor In A Leading Role	Equus	Nominated	
2005	Gemini Awards	Best Performance by an Actor in a Leading Role in a Dramatic Program or Mini Series	The Death and Life of Nancy Eaton	Won	
2005	Leo Awards	Best Supporting Performance by a Male in a Feature Length Drama	Everyone	Nominated	
2006	Leo Awards	Best Lead Performance by a Male in a Feature Length Drama	Paper Moon Affair	Nominated	
2009	Leo Awards	Best Guest Performance by a Male in a Dramatic Series	The Guard	Nominated	
2015	Leo Awards	Best Supporting Performance by a Male in a Dramatic Series	Rogue	Nominated	
2020	Leo Awards	Best Performance by a Male in a Short Drama	The Road	Nominated	
