= List of Masters of Sex episodes =

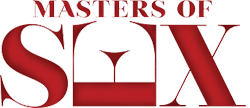

Masters of Sex is an American television drama series developed for television by Michelle Ashford and based on the biography Masters of Sex: The Life and Times of William Masters and Virginia Johnson, the Couple Who Taught America How to Love by Thomas Maier. Masters of Sex tells the story of Dr. William Masters (Michael Sheen) and Virginia Johnson (Lizzy Caplan), two pioneering researchers of human sexuality at Washington University in St. Louis, Missouri. The series premiered on September 29, 2013 on Showtime, and was cancelled on November 30, 2016 after four seasons.

During the course of the series, 46 episodes of Masters of Sex aired, between September 29, 2013, and November 13, 2016.

== Series overview ==
Season	Episodes	Originally released	
Season	Episodes	First released	Last released
1	12	September 29, 2013	December 15, 2013
2	12	July 13, 2014	September 28, 2014
3	12	July 12, 2015	September 27, 2015
4	10	September 11, 2016	November 13, 2016

== Episodes ==
=== Season 1 (2013) ===
No. overall	No. in season	Title	Directed by	Written by	Original release date	US viewers (millions)
1	1	"Pilot"	John Madden	Michelle Ashford	September 29, 2013	0.998
2	2	"Race to Space"	Michael Dinner	Michelle Ashford	October 6, 2013	1.090
3	3	"Standard Deviation"	Lawrence Trilling	Sam Shaw	October 13, 2013	1.042
4	4	"Thank You for Coming"	Jennifer Getzinger	Amy Lippman	October 20, 2013	1.012
5	5	"Catherine"	Michael Apted	Sam Shaw & Michelle Ashford	October 27, 2013	1.009
6	6	"Brave New World"	Adam Davidson	Lyn Greene & Richard Levine	November 3, 2013	0.933
7	7	"All Together Now"	Tim Fywell	Tyler Bensinger	November 10, 2013	1.095
8	8	"Love and Marriage"	Michael Apted	Story by : Tyler Bensinger; Teleplay by : Michael Cunningham	November 17, 2013	1.050
9	9	"Involuntary"	Jennifer Getzinger	Noelle Valdivia	November 24, 2013	1.128
10	10	"Fallout"	Lesli Linka Glatter	Sam Shaw	December 1, 2013	1.076
11	11	"Phallic Victories"	Phil Abraham	Amy Lippman	December 8, 2013	1.234
12	12	"Manhigh"	Michael Dinner	Michelle Ashford	December 15, 2013	1.207

=== Season 2 (2014) ===
No. overall	No. in season	Title	Directed by	Written by	Original release date	US viewers (millions)
13	1	"Parallax"	Michael Apted	Michelle Ashford	July 13, 2014	0.825
14	2	"Kyrie Eleison"	Michael Apted	David Flebotte	July 20, 2014	0.716
15	3	"Fight"	Michael Apted	Amy Lippman	July 27, 2014	0.838
16	4	"Dirty Jobs"	Michael Engler	Steven Levenson	August 3, 2014	0.706
17	5	"Giants"	Jeremy Webb	Bathsheba Doran	August 10, 2014	0.971
18	6	"Blackbird"	Keith Gordon	Eileen Myers	August 17, 2014	0.793
19	7	"Asterion"	Michael Dinner	David Flebotte & Michelle Ashford	August 24, 2014	0.840
20	8	"Mirror, Mirror"	Michael Apted	Steven Levenson	August 31, 2014	0.726
21	9	"Story of My Life"	Jeremy Webb	Amy Lippman	September 7, 2014	0.760
22	10	"Below the Belt"	Adam Arkin	Bathsheba Doran & Eileen Myers	September 14, 2014	0.804
23	11	"One for the Money, Two for the Show"	Adam Bernstein	Amy Lippman	September 21, 2014	0.714
24	12	"The Revolution Will Not Be Televised"	Adam Arkin	Michelle Ashford	September 28, 2014	0.889

=== Season 3 (2015) ===
No. overall	No. in season	Title	Directed by	Written by	Original release date	US viewers (millions)
25	1	"Parliament of Owls"	Jeremy Webb	Michelle Ashford	July 12, 2015	0.583
26	2	"Three's a Crowd"	Dean Parisot	Amy Lippman	July 19, 2015	0.535
27	3	"The Excitement of Release"	Miguel Sapochnik	Steven Levenson	July 26, 2015	0.509
28	4	"Undue Influence"	Christopher Manley	Gina Fattore	August 2, 2015	0.585
29	5	"Matters of Gravity"	Adam Arkin	Esta Spalding	August 9, 2015	0.552
30	6	"Two Scents"	Michael Weaver	David Flebotte	August 16, 2015	0.734
31	7	"Monkey Business"	Adam Arkin	Michelle Ashford & David Flebotte	August 23, 2015	0.643
32	8	"Surrogates"	Matt Earl Beesley	Steven Levenson	August 30, 2015	0.688
33	9	"High Anxiety"	Dan Attias	Jonathan Igla	September 6, 2015	0.562
34	10	"Through a Glass, Darkly"	Jeremy Webb	Steven Levenson & Esta Spalding	September 13, 2015	0.601
35	11	"Party of Four"	Susanna White	Amy Lippman	September 20, 2015	0.548
36	12	"Full Ten Count"	Michael Apted	Michelle Ashford	September 27, 2015	0.605

=== Season 4 (2016) ===
No. overall	No. in season	Title	Directed by	Written by	Original release date	US viewers (millions)
37	1	"Freefall"	Colin Bucksey	Michelle Ashford	September 2, 2016 (online); September 11, 2016 (Showtime)	0.518
38	2	"Inventory"	Jeremy Webb	Steven Levenson	September 18, 2016	0.420
39	3	"The Pleasure Protocol"	Adam Arkin	Ellen Fairey	September 25, 2016	0.422
40	4	"Coats or Keys"	Colin Bucksey	Amy Lippman	October 2, 2016	0.525
41	5	"Outliers"	Eric Galileo Tignini	Esta Spalding	October 9, 2016	0.341
42	6	"Family Only"	Colin Bucksey	Seth Fisher	October 16, 2016	0.506
43	7	"In To Me You See"	Michael Apted	Matthew-Lee Erlbach	October 23, 2016	0.486
44	8	"Topeka"	Julie Anne Robinson	Esta Spalding	October 30, 2016	0.393
45	9	"Night and Day"	Karyn Kusama	Steven Levenson	November 6, 2016	0.463
46	10	"The Eyes of God"	Michael Apted	Michelle Ashford	November 13, 2016	0.457

== Ratings ==
Masters of Sex : U.S. viewers per episode (thousands)

Season	Episode number											
Season	1	2	3	4	5	6	7	8	9	10	11	12
1	998	1090	1042	1012	1009	933	1095	1050	1128	1076	1234	1207
2	825	716	838	706	971	793	840	726	760	804	714	889
3	583	535	509	585	552	734	643	688	562	601	548	605
4	518	420	422	525	341	506	486	393	463	457	–	

Audience measurement performed by Nielsen Media Research
