= Masters of Sex season 3 =

Masters of Sex
- Season 3
- Season 3 promotional poster
- No. of episodes: 12

Release
- Original network: Showtime
- Original release: July 12 – September 27, 2015

Season chronology
- ← Previous; Season 2 Next → Season 4

The third season of the American television drama series Masters of Sex premiered on July 12, 2015, and concluded on September 27, 2015, consisting of 12 episodes. Showtime broadcast the third season on Sundays at 10:00 pm (ET) in the United States.

The series was developed for television by Michelle Ashford and is based on the biography Masters of Sex: The Life and Times of William Masters and Virginia Johnson, the Couple Who Taught America How to Love by Thomas Maier. Masters of Sex tells the story of Dr. William Masters (Michael Sheen) and Virginia Johnson (Lizzy Caplan), two pioneering researchers of human sexuality at Washington University in St. Louis. The third season takes place between 1965 and 1968.

== Cast ==
=== Main ===
- Michael Sheen as Dr. William Masters
- Lizzy Caplan as Virginia Johnson
- Caitlin FitzGerald as Libby Masters
- Annaleigh Ashford as Betty Dimello

=== Recurring ===
- Josh Charles as Daniel Logan
- Kevin Christy as Lester Linden
- Ben Koldyke as Paul Edley
- Jaeden Lieberher as Johnny Masters
- Isabelle Fuhrman as Tessa Johnson
- Beau Bridges as Barton Scully
- Colin Woodell as Ronald Sturgis
- Heléne Yorke as Jane Martin
- Emily Kinney as Nora Everett
- Alyvia Alyn Lind as Jenny Masters
- Rob Benedict as Jonathan Laurents
- Kevin Fonteyne as Matt
- Susan May Pratt as Joy Edley
- Michael O'Keefe as Harry Eshelman
- Teddy Sears as Dr. Austin Langham
- Sarah Silverman as Helen
- Garrett M. Brown as Chancellor Doug Fitzhugh
- Dennis Cockrum as Francis Masters
- Tate Donovan as Graham Pennington
- Julie Ann Emery as Jo
- Frances Fisher as Edna Eshelman
- Eve Gordon as Judith
- Danny Jacobs as Bob Drag
- Allison Janney as Margaret Scully
- Mather Zickel as George Johnson

=== Guests ===
- Maggie Grace as Dr. Christine Wesh
- Judy Greer as Alice Logan
- Eric Lange as David Buckland
- Jack Laufer as Herb Spleeb
- Noah Robbins as Henry Johnson
- Necar Zadegan as Queen of Iran
- Waleed Zuaiter as Mohammad, Shah of Iran

== Production ==
The series was renewed for a 12-episode third season on August 20, 2014, by Showtime. In March 2015, Allison Janney confirmed she would return for the third season in a multi-episode arc, and Beau Bridges was also confirmed to be returning by series developer Michelle Ashford. Series regular Teddy Sears, who portrays Austin Langham, returned in a recurring role for the third season. In April 2015, it was reported that Maggie Grace would guest star in an episode, playing a gynecologist. Isabelle Fuhrman was cast in a recurring role, playing Virginia's daughter, Tessa; Fuhrman took over the role from Kayla Madison, who played the character for the first two seasons. In May 2015, several recurring roles were announced, including Josh Charles, Tate Donovan, Julie Ann Emery, and that Heléne Yorke would return as Jane Martin in a recurring role after only appearing once in season 2 due to Yorke's unavailability. In June 2015, it was announced that Sarah Silverman would reprise her role as Helen for a multi-episode arc in season 3. In July 2015, it was announced that Emily Kinney was cast in a recurring role as Nora.

The season premiere was released online on YouTube and Showtime's official website on July 2, 2015. The episode, however, is censored for content, including strong language and nudity.

== Episodes ==
No. overall	No. in season	Title	Directed by	Written by	Original release date	US viewers (millions)
25	1	"Parliament of Owls"	Jeremy Webb	Michelle Ashford	July 12, 2015	0.583
Masters and Johnson take comments from the press regarding the publication of their upcoming book Human Sexual Response. In flashbacks to the previous summer, the Masters and Johnson families vacation together at a lake house. Libby attempts to remedy her depression.
26	2	"Three's a Crowd"	Dean Parisot	Amy Lippman	July 19, 2015	0.535
Johnson takes a leave of absence as she undergoes a pregnancy. To give her partnership with Masters legitimacy, she agrees to remarry George. The Shah of Iran and his wife seek fertility treatment from Masters.
27	3	"The Excitement of Release"	Miguel Sapochnik	Steven Levenson	July 26, 2015	0.509
Human Sexual Response is published and receives a mixed response from the public. Masters wants the book to be utilized as a textbook while Johnson seeks an investor for the clinic. Libby gives support to her neighbor. Tessa's experience at school is impacted by her mother's work.
28	4	"Undue Influence"	Christopher Manley	Gina Fattore	August 2, 2015	0.585
Johnson receives a worrying letter from her son in Vietnam and finds support in the clinic's new investor, Dan Logan. Masters attempts to soften his personality. Libby helps her neighbors recover from a tragedy. Margaret tries to adapt to a much different kind of relationship.
29	5	"Matters of Gravity"	Adam Arkin	Esta Spalding	August 9, 2015	0.552
Masters is invited back to Washington University to deliver a speech after the success of the book. Johnson's parents arrive unannounced. Religious fanatics protest the clinic. Johnny is bullied at school and Masters seeks justice.
30	6	"Two Scents"	Michael Weaver	David Flebotte	August 16, 2015	0.734
The Masters and Johnson clinic take on a high-profile Hollywood couple. Johnson reaches her breaking point with her mother. Masters attempts to reinvigorate his relationship with Johnson just as Logan attempts to pursue her. Libby discovers Joy's secret apartment.
31	7	"Monkey Business"	Adam Arkin	Michelle Ashford & David Flebotte	August 23, 2015	0.643
Masters and Johnson are enlisted to apply their sexual dysfunction remedies to a gorilla. Johnson's relationship with Logan deepens. Masters is enticed by the idea of surrogate work. Betty and Helen want a baby and weigh their options. Libby begins an affair with Paul.
32	8	"Surrogates"	Matt Earl Beesley	Steven Levenson	August 30, 2015	0.688
Johnson and Logan disappear to Las Vegas for a weekend. Masters uses her absence to launch the surrogacy program despite Johnson's reservations. Betty, Helen, and Austin participate in an elaborate ruse to get pregnant via the clinic. Libby gives Paul insight into her past affair.
33	9	"High Anxiety"	Dan Attias	Jonathan Igla	September 6, 2015	0.562
Johnson returns from Nevada incensed by Masters launching the surrogacy program behind her back. Her objections to the program ultimately fall on deaf ears as Masters develops a bond with one of the surrogates. Logan's research at the clinic hits a dead end. Austin seeks comfort from Betty and Helen after he loses custody of his children.
34	10	"Through a Glass, Darkly"	Jeremy Webb	Steven Levenson & Esta Spalding	September 13, 2015	0.601
Masters becomes desperate in his efforts to repair his relationship with Johnson. In his fervor, he agrees to sacrifice the surrogacy program. Libby's birthday approaches and the men in her life aim to please. Johnson's relationship with her daughter deteriorates. Barton goes out with a co-worker.
35	11	"Party of Four"	Susanna White	Amy Lippman	September 20, 2015	0.548
In the aftermath of a tense meeting with their publisher in New York, Masters organizes a dinner with Johnson, Logan, and Mrs. Logan. As the night unfolds, Masters' true intentions are exposed. Libby discovers that Masters is being investigated by the police.
36	12	"Full Ten Count"	Michael Apted	Michelle Ashford	September 27, 2015	0.605
Masters and Johnson are faced with trumped up prostitution charges, an ill-timed event to promote their next book, and the possible disintegration of their partnership. Logan returns from Mexico an unmarried man. Libby announces she's leaving Masters. In a last-ditch attempt to win over Johnson, Masters professes his love for her.

== Reception ==
=== Critical response ===
The third season has received generally positive reviews from critics. It has a Metacritic score of 72 out of 100 based on 14 reviews. On Rotten Tomatoes, it has a 77% approval rating among critics based on 26 reviews, with a rating average of 7.9 out of 10. Verne Gay of Newsday wrote that the series "just gets better and better" and that it has "layered, intricate stories". Robert Rorke of the New York Post praised the performances of Michael Sheen and Lizzy Caplan.

=== Accolades ===
For the 68th Primetime Emmy Awards, Allison Janney was nominated for Outstanding Guest Actress in a Drama Series.
