= Masters of Sex season 2 =

Masters of Sex
- Season 2
- Season 2 promotional poster
- No. of episodes: 12

Release
- Original network: Showtime
- Original release: July 13 – September 28, 2014

Season chronology
- ← Previous; Season 1 Next → Season 3

The second season of the American television drama series Masters of Sex premiered on July 13, 2014, and concluded on September 28, 2014. Showtime broadcast the twelve episode second season on Sundays at 10:00 pm (ET) in the United States. The second season was released on DVD and Blu-ray in region 1 on May 5, 2015.

The series was developed for television by Michelle Ashford and is based on the biography Masters of Sex: The Life and Times of William Masters and Virginia Johnson, the Couple Who Taught America How to Love by Thomas Maier. Masters of Sex tells the story of Dr. William Masters (Michael Sheen) and Virginia Johnson (Lizzy Caplan), two pioneering researchers of human sexuality at Washington University in St. Louis, Missouri. The second season takes place between 1958 and 1961.

== Cast ==
=== Main ===
- Michael Sheen as Dr. William Masters
- Lizzy Caplan as Virginia Johnson
- Caitlin FitzGerald as Libby Masters
- Teddy Sears as Dr. Austin Langham
- Annaleigh Ashford as Betty Dimello

=== Recurring ===
- Betsy Brandt as Barbara Sanderson, a secretary at Gateway Memorial Hospital
- Artemis Pebdani as Flo Packer
- Jocko Sims as Robert Franklin
- Kevin Christy as Lester Linden
- Kayla Madison as Tessa Johnson, Virginia's daughter
- Greg Grunberg as Gene Moretti
- Julianne Nicholson as Dr. Lillian DePaul
- Ann Dowd as Estabrooks Masters, William's mother
- Keke Palmer as Coral, the Masters' nanny
- Adam Arkin as Shep Tally
- John Billingsley as Dr. Lloyd Madden
- Christian Borle as Frank Masters, younger brother of Dr. Masters
- Danny Huston as Dr. Douglas Greathouse
- Marin Ireland as Pauline Masters
- Jack Laufer as Herb Spleeb
- Cole Sand as Henry Johnson, Virginia's son
- Courtney B. Vance as Dr. Charles Hendricks, the chief of staff at Buell Green Hospital
- Barry Watson as Shelley Decklin
- Alex Wyse as Elliot
- Elizabeth Bogush as Elise Langham
- Beau Bridges as Provost Barton Scully
- Nicholas D'Agosto as Dr. Ethan Haas
- Rose McIver as Vivian Scully, daughter of Barton and Margaret Scully
- Sarah Silverman as Helen
- Mather Zickel as George Johnson, Virginia's ex-husband

=== Guests ===
- Allison Janney as Margaret Scully, Barton's wife
- Heléne Yorke as Jane Martin
- René Auberjonois as Georgios Papanikolaou

== Production ==
Showtime renewed the series for a second season of 12 episodes on October 22, 2013. In March 2014, Showtime announced the season would premiere in July 2014 as opposed to in the fall as the first season did.

=== Casting ===
Annaleigh Ashford, who had a recurring role in the first season as Betty Dimello, was promoted to series regular for season two. Nicholas D'Agosto, who portrays Dr. Ethan Haas does not return as a series regular in season two, however he has a voice-only role in the season premiere. Several new recurring roles were cast for the second season, including Betsy Brandt and Keke Palmer in March 2014, Sarah Silverman in April, René Auberjonois, Christian Borle, and Courtney B. Vance in May, and Erin Cummings in June. Auberjonois and Cummings however, ultimately only appeared in single episodes.

== Episodes ==
No. overall	No. in season	Title	Directed by	Written by	Original release date	US viewers (millions)
13	1	"Parallax"	Michael Apted	Michelle Ashford	July 13, 2014	0.825
The presentation continues to affect the reputations of both Masters and Johnson. Johnson faces continued harassment while Masters is implored to find a new position. Dr. Scully recovers from his electro-shock treatment.
14	2	"Kyrie Eleison"	Michael Apted	David Flebotte	July 20, 2014	0.716
Masters begins work at Memorial Hospital, though he is unable to convince his superiors to hire Johnson. Libby hires a nanny for the baby. Dr. Scully's whereabouts are questioned.
15	3	"Fight"	Michael Apted	Amy Lippman	July 27, 2014	0.838
Masters is troubled by a parent's response to a case of atypical genitalia. That night, he and Johnson engage in a rendezvous at a hotel. The evening takes a dark turn when details regarding his childhood emerge.
16	4	"Dirty Jobs"	Michael Engler	Steven Levenson	August 3, 2014	0.706
Masters' continued efforts to hire Johnson at Memorial face opposition. Langham suspects that Masters and Johnson are having an affair. Betty's infertility lie reaches the end of the line. Libby suspects that Coral may have brought lice into the house.
17	5	"Giants"	Jeremy Webb	Bathsheba Doran	August 10, 2014	0.971
Masters and Johnson move their study to Buell Green, a predominantly black St. Louis hospital. DePaul confronts Johnson regarding her affair. Betty's former lover attempts to rekindle their romance. Libby and Coral continue to remain at odds.
18	6	"Blackbird"	Keith Gordon	Eileen Myers	August 17, 2014	0.793
New restrictions are put on the study at Buell Green while Masters' attempts to speak to a journalist backfire. Johnson is distraught by DePaul's decision to quit her chemotherapy. Betty's relationship with Helen is outed.
19	7	"Asterion"	Michael Dinner	David Flebotte & Michelle Ashford	August 24, 2014	0.840
Masters cuts off his sexual work with Johnson following the revelation she's been seeing other men. Over the course of three years, Masters and Johnson attempt to keep their new clinic solvent.
20	8	"Mirror, Mirror"	Michael Apted	Steven Levenson	August 31, 2014	0.726
Masters takes on a patient from his past while Johnson takes unusual steps to help Barbara. Libby is caught in the middle of a racial dilemma. Langham joins a new line of work.
21	9	"Story of My Life"	Jeremy Webb	Amy Lippman	September 7, 2014	0.760
Johnson's use of therapy forces her to confront her feelings. Masters accompanies his brother to an AA meeting. Libby agrees to testify for Robert. Barbara and Lester connect.
22	10	"Below the Belt"	Adam Arkin	Bathsheba Doran & Eileen Myers	September 14, 2014	0.804
Masters confides to Johnson that he's been suffering from impotence, prompting them to find a cure for sexual dysfunction. A television crew takes an interest in the clinic's work. Masters reaches his limit with his brother. Libby begins volunteering for CORE.
23	11	"One for the Money, Two for the Show"	Adam Bernstein	Amy Lippman	September 21, 2014	0.714
A television crew documents Masters and Johnson's work. Johnson consults a divorce lawyer regarding a family issue. Langham continues his relationship with Flo. Libby and Robert accompany each other home.
24	12	"The Revolution Will Not Be Televised"	Adam Arkin	Michelle Ashford	September 28, 2014	0.889
Masters is horrified by the presentation of his work in the CBS documentary. Johnson takes an enormous gamble to keep custody of her children. A rival study emerges out of California. The tables turn in Flo and Langham's relationship.

== Reception ==
=== Critical response ===
The second season of Masters of Sex has received acclaim from critics. The season has a Metacritic score of 89 out of 100 based on 15 reviews. Alan Sepinwall of HitFix wrote that season 2 is even better than season 1, and that the series "has much more on its mind than simply the tumultuous relationship between its two famous central characters. But if it just had those two, it would still be among the best things you could watch on television this summer." Hank Stuever of The Washington Post wrote "It is intelligent, witty, quick-paced and surprising; it is tragic without being emotionally devastating." Verne Gay of Newsday wrote that season 2 is "Better, richer, more compelling than season one" and the season's third episode, "Fight", is the best episode the series has done to date.

=== Accolades ===
For the 5th Critics' Choice Television Awards, Julianne Nicholson was nominated for Best Guest Performer in a Drama Series. For the 67th Primetime Emmy Awards, Beau Bridges was nominated for Outstanding Guest Actor in a Drama Series and Allison Janney was nominated for Outstanding Guest Actress in a Drama Series.
