= Masters of Sex season 1 =

Masters of Sex
- Season 1
- Season 1 promotional poster
- No. of episodes: 12

Release
- Original network: Showtime
- Original release: September 29 – December 15, 2013

Season chronology
- Next → Season 2

The first season of the American television drama series Masters of Sex premiered on September 29, 2013, and concluded on December 15, 2013. It consists of twelve episodes, each running for approximately 55 minutes in length. Showtime broadcast the first season on Sundays at 10:00 pm (ET) in the United States. Internationally, the season aired in Canada on The Movie Network concurrently with the American broadcast, and it debuted in the UK on Channel 4 on October 8, 2013.

The series was developed for television by Michelle Ashford and is based on the biography Masters of Sex: The Life and Times of William Masters and Virginia Johnson, the Couple Who Taught America How to Love by Thomas Maier. Masters of Sex tells the story of Dr. William Masters (Michael Sheen) and Virginia Johnson (Lizzy Caplan), two pioneering researchers of human sexuality at Washington University in St. Louis. The first season takes place between 1956 and 1958.

== Cast ==
=== Main ===
- Michael Sheen as Dr. William Masters
- Lizzy Caplan as Virginia Johnson
- Caitlin FitzGerald as Libby Masters
- Teddy Sears as Dr. Austin Langham
- Nicholas D'Agosto as Dr. Ethan Haas

=== Recurring ===
- Heléne Yorke as Jane Martin
- Beau Bridges as Provost Barton Scully
- Julianne Nicholson as Dr. Lillian DePaul
- Allison Janney as Margaret Scully, Barton's wife
- Kayla Madison as Tessa Johnson, Virginia's daughter
- Rose McIver as Vivian Scully, their daughter
- Cole Sand as Henry Johnson, Virginia's son
- Kevin Christy as Lester Linden
- Finn Wittrock as Dale, a prostitute whom Barton Scully patronizes
- Annaleigh Ashford as Betty Dimello
- Garrett M. Brown as Chancellor Doug Fitzhugh
- Ann Dowd as Estabrooks Masters, William's mother
- Mather Zickel as George Johnson, Virginia's ex-husband

=== Guests ===
- Margo Martindale as Miss Horchow
- Elizabeth Bogush as Elise Langham
- Greg Grunberg as Gene Moretti

== Production ==
Showtime ordered the pilot for Masters of Sex in August 2011, and greenlit it for series in June 2012, with the first season consisting of twelve episodes.

Writer/producer Michelle Ashford serves as showrunner for Masters of Sex. She assembled a majority-female writing staff, although she says this was unintentional.

Ashford created the character of Barton Scully out of a combination of several men whom Masters knew. One of them was gay, but was not the man serving as Provost during Masters's initial study.

Prop master Jeffrey Johnson noted the difficulty of obtaining accurate information about sexual devices from the time period. "They were so taboo it was hard to find research drawings. People didn’t even put them in writing." He obtained some vintage vibrators and dildos for use in the series along with acquiring condoms manufactured in the era (which did not have the reservoir tips of modern condoms). He designed "Ulysses," a transparent dildo with attached camera first seen in the pilot episode, from scratch, along with a diaphragm sizing kit seen in later episodes.

== Episodes ==
No. overall	No. in season	Title	Directed by	Written by	Original release date	US viewers (millions)
1	1	"Pilot"	John Madden	Michelle Ashford	September 29, 2013	0.998
In October 1956, Washington University researcher Dr. William "Bill" Masters (Michael Sheen) proposes a controversial study of human sexuality but is rejected by his university. Undaunted, he begins the study anyway and hires Virginia Johnson (Lizzy Caplan), a nightclub singer-turned-secretary, as his assistant. Upon learning that their sole subject, prostitute Betty Dimello (Annaleigh Ashford), is a lesbian, Virginia sets about recruiting additional female and male subjects, including Bill's colleague Dr. Austin Langham (Teddy Sears). She enters into a sexual relationship with Dr. Ethan Haas (Nicholas D'Agosto) but he becomes overly attached and eventually physically abusive. Bill induces his wife Libby (Caitlin FitzGerald) to undergo painful and invasive infertility treatments, despite, according to Haas, Bill being the infertile one. Bill suggests that he and Virginia defuse possible "sexual transference" by having sex with each other as part of the study.
2	2	"Race to Space"	Michael Dinner	Michelle Ashford	October 6, 2013	1.090
Virginia has trouble telling Bill that she cannot accept his proposal, but Bill informs her that Scully has cancelled the study because he found out they were monitoring couples having sex. Bill believes it was Ethan who told Scully and fires Virginia on the spot for sleeping with him. Bill moves the study to a brothel with the help of Betty, but he and the participating prostitutes are arrested shortly after. Meanwhile, after being rejected by Virginia, Ethan tries to replicate their sexual liaison with other girls, but to no avail. Virginia coaxes some reluctant prostitutes to rejoin the study, and Bill temporarily takes her back to work with him, but refuses to commit beyond the day-to-day.
3	3	"Standard Deviation"	Lawrence Trilling	Sam Shaw	October 13, 2013	1.042
Bill and Virginia continue working at the brothel but Bill grows increasingly frustrated with the conditions. Betty recruits some men for the study but Bill is nonplussed to learn they are homosexual prostitutes. Betty blackmails Bill into reversing her tubal ligation but the procedure fails, leading Betty to commit to deceiving her fiancé. Haas takes the case of a woman carrying quadruplets but Scully reassigns it to Bill. Bill drops the homosexual men from his study on the grounds that they are not "deviant" but "deviate", and uses information gleaned from one of them, Dale, to blackmail Scully into allowing the study back into the hospital. Libby learns she is pregnant.
4	4	"Thank You for Coming"	Jennifer Getzinger	Amy Lippman	October 20, 2013	1.012
With the study back in the hospital, Bill and Virginia recruit new participants on campus. Virginia has a one-night tryst with her ex-husband, George, who appears at the hospital, having signed up as a study participant. Bill begins sleepwalking, possibly due to anxiety. His mother comes to visit, and suggests that she move to an apartment close to them to spend more time with the baby, but this stirs up painful childhood memories of the physical abuse Masters suffered at the hands of his father, and his mother’s inaction in the face of it. Libby's attempt at playing matchmaker with Virginia and Ethan does not go smoothly. Ethan ends up forming a relationship with Provost Scully’s daughter, Vivian. Masters snaps at Virginia's son at a dinner party, which disturbs Libby, who witnesses this.
5	5	"Catherine"	Michael Apted	Sam Shaw & Michelle Ashford	October 27, 2013	1.009
When Bill and Virginia expand the study to include couples, they discover that the nature of sex is affected by the participants' attraction to one another. Austin is asked to participate in the study again, but is disappointed that his partner is not Jane, and cannot achieve an erection. This angers him, and he demands that the findings be thrown out and that he be paired with no one else, as Jane will only have sex with him as part of the study, due to the fact that Austin is married. Bill experiences anxiety about becoming a father. Ethan is worried about dating Barton Scully's daughter, Vivian, but she reassures him that they were meant to be together. Libby suffers a miscarriage, a loss that leads Barton to begin to reconcile his relationship with Bill. Virginia deals with her son Henry's resentment and rebelliousness. Bill delivers his stillborn daughter, and later shares a moment with Johnson, during which he breaks down in tears.
6	6	"Brave New World"	Adam Davidson	Lyn Greene & Richard Levine	November 3, 2013	0.933
Libby and Bill vacation in Miami, but Masters is drawn back into his work by a sexually adventurous couple there, while Libby tries to open a dialogue with them. Virginia enlists Jane in an effort to debunk Freud's theory that a vaginal orgasm is more mature one than a clitoral one. Dr. DePaul complains to Masters about the respect given to Johnson, who is often mistaken as a doctor, whereas DePaul is often mistaken for a member of the secretarial pool. She also accuses him of conferring legitimacy upon Johnson because of his sexual attraction to her. Langham finds a cure for his sexual dysfunction in Barton's wife, Margaret. Bill realizes that it is a disservice to call Virginia a "secretary", and says that she will now be called his Research Assistant. He will also hire a secretary to help them, which will allow Johnson to focus on the study. Virginia reveals that female participants in the study have shown or reported that they can orgasm without genital stimulation, and when Masters expresses skepticism at this, Johnson disrobes, attaches the electrodes to her body, and induces him to help her show this to him. They then have sex.
7	7	"All Together Now"	Tim Fywell	Tyler Bensinger	November 10, 2013	1.095
Virginia tries to find a new secretary. Bill tries to balance the study and his affair with his home life. Austin continues his sexual relationship with Margaret Scully, while Barton Scully is stabbed by a trio of gay-bashing thugs while waiting in a car cruising for gay sex. Feeling he cannot be seen at a hospital, he tries to treat himself, but Masters intervenes and stitches him up. He comes home to catch Margaret in her infidelity, but his indifference to it hurts Margaret, who believes him to be cheating on her with other women. Though Barton insists there are no other women, and that she is everything to him, a hurt Margaret concludes that he does not find her sexually attractive any more. Meanwhile, despite the fact that Bill has decided to give up trying for a baby, Libby asks Ethan to continue with the infertility treatment, in fear that without a child, Bill will grow bored of his life and run away with another woman.
8	8	"Love and Marriage"	Michael Apted	Story by : Tyler Bensinger; Teleplay by : Michael Cunningham	November 17, 2013	1.050
Johnson redoubles her efforts to get a college degree, but when she learns that Dr. DePaul's Basic Anatomy class is a requirement, DePaul refuses to give her class credit for her work with Masters, though she later concedes that Johnson is one of her better students. Margaret encounters Dale, Scully’s lover, at a bar, and after he states that he is meeting someone there, she sees that the someone is Barton, who had told her that he had a board meeting that night, and who tries to cover by saying that Dale is a graduate student of his. Margaret, however, sees through this lie. Barton later tries to tell her that Dale is the pimp who supplies him with prostitutes, while also expressing heartbreak at her infidelity. He attempts to renew his relationship with Margaret, and vows never to cheat on her again. Margaret realizes that he has never been sexually attracted to her, and wants a divorce. Barton purloins drugs from the hospital and asks Dale to help him with aversion therapy to change his sexuality but Dale refuses. Ethan and Vivian become engaged. Libby faints during a dance lesson and learns that she is pregnant again.
9	9	"Involuntary"	Jennifer Getzinger	Noelle Valdivia	November 24, 2013	1.128
Bill and Virginia decide to film external bodily reactions in the study, and hire filmmaker Lester to film Jane masturbating. Vivian wants a Christian wedding. After revealing that he is Jewish, Ethan agrees to convert to Christianity. Estabrooks expresses regret that she never spoke up to oppose the physical abuse Bill's father inflicted upon him. She also reveals that he had a years-long affair with his secretary, and says that she sees that there is something going on between Bill and Virginia, making a comparison between father and son that provokes Bill's anger. She says that he needs to resolve the problems in his marriage. Libby tells Bill that she is pregnant, but his disbelief that Libby could have gotten pregnant, and her own views on the lack of humanity in his work makes it an awkward revelation. Ethan tells Vivian that he will not convert to Christianity and breaks up with her. Jane sees the footage of her masturbation study, and, displeased with seeing her orgasm "from the outside", refuses to allow it to be used. Virginia agrees to be filmed masturbating, but only if Bill is the only other person in the room, working the camera himself. Bill, in response to his growing feelings for Virginia, attempts to distance himself by paying her for being a subject in the study. Virginia decides that she needs to emotionally detach herself as well.
10	10	"Fallout"	Lesli Linka Glatter	Sam Shaw	December 1, 2013	1.076
Flora Banks, a young woman, tells Bill and Virginia that she got pregnant from her participation in the study, and wants to know who the father is. Bill and Virginia disagree as to whether to maintain study confidentiality or divulge the father's identity. Ethan learns that he has been denied a future job at the hospital. Barton informs him that it is because he failed his performance review, as some of his superiors had concerns about his professionalism and character, which Ethan interprets as Bill's doing. This leads to a physical altercation between the two. DePaul struggles to get sufficient funding for her Pap smear proposal, and tries heeding Virginia's suggestion to use charm when speaking to University Chancellor Fitzhugh, to no avail. Margaret consults with a prostitute, who deduces that Barton is gay. She subsequently meets with Austin. Lester makes a romantic overture to Jane, who responds positively. Virginia finds out that the father of Flora's child is Austin, informs him of this, and gives Flora $2,000 from the study’s discretionary fund, both of which anger Bill. Before he can do anything about it, however, Virginia quits, and goes to work for DePaul as her secretary, telling her that they should try focusing on charming the Board of Trustees.
11	11	"Phallic Victories"	Phil Abraham	Amy Lippman	December 8, 2013	1.234
With Virginia no longer a part of his office, Bill accepts Libby's offer to temporarily serve as his secretary, to help him help compile the study work for a hospital-wide presentation. However, in the course of her work, she learns of a file on a couple who had sex in the study 23 times. She questions Bill about it, not realizing that the couple in question is Bill and Virginia. When Bill sees another doctor's presentation put his colleagues to sleep, he becomes determined to grab their attention even if it means presenting provoking, but incomplete, research on the issue of penis size and sexual satisfaction. DePaul and Virginia travel to a medical convention to give a presentation on the Pap smear. When their bus breaks down they are forced to spend a night at a motel, during which DePaul is angered to learn how Bill is compensated for his work, in light of the difficulty she has in securing funds. Because they missed the convention, DePaul instead presents her information to the doctors' wives. She later reveals to Virginia that a Pap smear revealed that she had cervical cancer in her mid-twenties, which led to a hysterectomy. She also reveals that the cancer returned 18 months ago and is past the point of treatment, as it has progressed to her liver. She asks Virginia to carry on her work after she is gone. Virginia's ex-husband George returns home and is dismayed to find Ethan taking care of his children. Though this leads initially to rivalry, Ethan eventually convinces him that he is good for Virginia and the children.
12	12	"Manhigh"	Michael Dinner	Michelle Ashford	December 15, 2013	1.207
Margaret confronts Barton about his homosexuality. He intends to pursue electroshock treatment with the hope of curing it, but Margaret has concerns about the risks involved. DePaul takes a more Bill-like approach when speaking again to Chancellor Fitzhugh about funding. But he tells her that the funding Bill gets is due to the patients he brings into the hospital, which DePaul does not. When she says that patients are not referred to her, Fitzhugh says this is because most women do not want to see a female gynecologist. Bill gives the presentation on his and Virginia's research to the hospital, but it does not get the response he had hoped. Chancellor Fitzhugh stops the presentation, calling the footage "smut". Ethan gets a job offer at UCLA, and proposes to Virginia. Libby later asks Bill who the second woman in the footage was, saying that the two doctors sitting beside Libby thought it was Virginia, but Bill evades her question. The other doctors also deduce that the first woman in the footage is Jane, though she denies this. They also start a petition that spurs Fitzhugh to fire Barton and Bill. Bill covers for Barton by portraying Barton as having been unaware of the study. To complete this illusion, Barton fires Bill in front of Fitzhugh; Barton later regrets this. While Libby goes into precipitous labor and gives birth, Bill goes to see Virginia and tells her he cannot live without her.

== Reception ==
=== Reviews ===
The first season of Masters of Sex has received acclaim from critics. Based on 49 reviews collected by Rotten Tomatoes, the first season received a 90% approval rating from critics, with a rating average of 8.4 out of 10. The sites consensus states: "Seductive and nuanced, Masters of Sex features smart performances, deft direction, and impeccable period decor." Metacritic gave the first season a score of 85/100, based on 32 reviews.

Matt Roush of TV Guide wrote that "There is no more fascinating, or entertaining, new series this fall season." Diane Werts of Newsday gave it an "A" grade, complimenting the series on its use of humor, stating "its deft balance of epic scope and whimsical humanity", as well as the strong performances of the actors and creator Michelle Ashford's "scene-setting scripts". David Wiegand of the San Francisco Chronicle particularly praises the performances, calling them "extraordinary" and "stunning", and noting the series' A-list directors such as Michael Apted and John Madden. Hank Stuever of The Washington Post wrote that after the first two episodes, "the characters get better and more complex, the story builds, strange things start to happen and now I can't wait to see how its interweaving plots unfold. Alan Sepinwall of HitFix praised lead actors Michael Sheen and Lizzy Caplan, calling them "terrific", and that "Masters of Sex is the best new show of the fall by a very long stretch. It's also a refreshing anomaly: a prestige cable drama that doesn't feel like a recombination of elements from 15 shows that came before it."

=== Accolades ===
In June 2013, the series was honored, along with five others, with the Critics' Choice Television Award for Most Exciting New Series. The series received two nominations for the 2014 Writers Guild of America Awards, for Best New Series and Best Episodic Drama for "Pilot". For the 71st Golden Globe Awards, the series was nominated for Best Drama Series, and Michael Sheen was nominated Best Drama Actor. For the 4th Critics' Choice Television Awards, the series received nominations for Best Drama Series, Michael Sheen for Best Actor in a Drama Series, Lizzy Caplan for Best Actress is a Drama Series, Beau Bridges for Best Guest Performer in a Drama Series, with Allison Janney winning for Best Guest Performer in a Drama Series. For the 66th Primetime Emmy Awards, Lizzy Caplan was nominated for Outstanding Lead Actress in a Drama Series, Beau Bridges was nominated for Outstanding Guest Actor in a Drama Series, and Allison Janney won for Outstanding Guest Actress in a Drama Series.

== Home media releases ==
The first season was released on DVD and Blu-ray in region 1 on June 24, 2014, in region 2 on July 28, 2014, and in region 4 on March 20, 2014.
