= Masters of Sex season 4 =

Masters of Sex
- Season 4
- Season 4 promotional poster
- No. of episodes: 10

Release
- Original network: Showtime
- Original release: September 11 – November 13, 2016

Season chronology
- ← Previous; Season 3

The fourth and final season of the American television drama series Masters of Sex premiered on September 11, 2016, and concluded on November 13, 2016, consisting of 10 episodes. Showtime broadcast the fourth season on Sundays at 10:00 pm (ET) in the United States. On November 30, 2016, shortly after the season ended, Showtime announced that the series had been cancelled.

The series was developed for television by Michelle Ashford and is based on the biography Masters of Sex: The Life and Times of William Masters and Virginia Johnson, the Couple Who Taught America How to Love by Thomas Maier. Masters of Sex tells the story of Dr. William Masters (Michael Sheen) and Virginia Johnson (Lizzy Caplan), two pioneering researchers of human sexuality at Washington University in St. Louis, Missouri. The fourth season takes place in 1968 and 1969.

== Cast ==
=== Main ===
- Michael Sheen as Dr. William Masters
- Lizzy Caplan as Virginia Johnson
- Caitlin FitzGerald as Libby Masters
- Annaleigh Ashford as Betty Dimello

=== Recurring ===
- Beau Bridges as Barton Scully
- Kevin Christy as Lester Linden
- Nick Clifford as Guy
- Frances Fisher as Edna Eshelman
- Isabelle Fuhrman as Tessa Johnson
- Betty Gilpin as Nancy Leveau
- Danny Jacobs as Bob Drag
- Erin Karpluk as Darleen Connolly
- Jack Laufer as Herb Spleeb
- Jaeden Lieberher as Johnny Masters
- Niecy Nash as Louise Bell
- Kelli O'Hara as Dody Oliver
- Michael O'Keefe as Harry Eshelman
- Alysia Reiner as Anita
- Teddy Sears as Dr. Austin Langham
- Sarah Silverman as Helen
- Jeremy Strong as Art Dreesen
- David Walton as Bram Keller
- Ashley Zukerman as Gary Diebold

=== Guests ===
- Judy Greer as Alice Logan
- Andre Royo as Sammy Davis Jr.

== Production ==
The series was renewed for a 12-episode fourth season on August 11, 2015, by Showtime; however, the episode count was later reduced to 10. In June 2016, production began in Los Angeles and several recurring roles for the season were announced, including Niecy Nash, Betty Gilpin, Erin Karpluk, Alysia Reiner, Jeremy Strong, Ashley Zukerman, and David Walton. In July 2016, it was announced that Andre Royo would be playing Sammy Davis Jr. and in August 2016, it was announced that Kelli O'Hara had been cast in a recurring role.

== Episodes ==
No. overall	No. in season	Title	Directed by	Written by	Original release date	US viewers (millions)
37	1	"Freefall"	Colin Bucksey	Michelle Ashford	September 2, 2016 (online); September 11, 2016 (Showtime)	0.518
Betty struggles to keep the clinic afloat as the Masters and Johnson partnership appears to be dead. Masters' legal woes continue to pile up. Johnson attempts to publish a column through Hugh Hefner. Hefner sees this as an opportunity to reunite the sex experts. Libby expresses her rage against Masters.
38	2	"Inventory"	Jeremy Webb	Steven Levenson	September 18, 2016	0.420
Masters and Johnson return to work and fulfill their commitment to hire new partners for both of them: Masters hires Nancy Leveau (Betty Gilpin) as a partner and Johnson goes through several candidates before ultimately hiring Art Dreesen (Jeremy Strong). Libby gets a job.
39	3	"The Pleasure Protocol"	Adam Arkin	Ellen Fairey	September 25, 2016	0.422
Alice Logan (Judy Greer) returns and informs Masters that Johnson never married Dan Logan. Masters assembles his legal team. Johnson continues a self-destructive spiral. Nancy and Art's marriage is exposed.
40	4	"Coats or Keys"	Colin Bucksey	Amy Lippman	October 2, 2016	0.525
Art and Nancy host a swingers party attended by Masters, Johnson, Betty, Libby, and Lester (all of whom unaware of the kind of party they are at). Masters and Libby reexamine their marriage. Johnson confronts her feelings toward Masters.
41	5	"Outliers"	Eric Galileo Tignini	Esta Spalding	October 9, 2016	0.341
Masters and Johnson go to court to settle their outstanding legal case. Masters rekindles his relationship with Libby. Johnson attempts to salvage their book deal. Art and Nancy discover that the clinic is being bugged. Helen must conceal her relationship with Betty from her conservative parents.
42	6	"Family Only"	Colin Bucksey	Seth Fisher	October 16, 2016	0.506
Johnson makes continued attempts to rekindle her romance with Masters. Masters and Johnson suspect that their book agent is a closeted homosexual. Nancy and Johnson's disagreements reach a boiling point. Helen goes into labor. Libby visits a nudist colony.
43	7	"In To Me You See"	Michael Apted	Matthew-Lee Erlbach	October 23, 2016	0.486
Masters gives Art authority to begin studying homosexuals. Johnson and Nancy investigate self-proclaimed sex gurus stealing the clinic's techniques. Masters' AA sponsor (Niecy Nash) requests help reinvigorating her sex life with her paraplegic husband.
44	8	"Topeka"	Julie Anne Robinson	Esta Spalding	October 30, 2016	0.393
Masters and Johnson go undercover to investigate charlatans pirating their methods. Masters uses this trip to reconnect with a past lover (Kelli O'Hara). Nancy takes advantage of their absence by developing a plan to start her own clinic with Art. Libby considers going to law school.
45	9	"Night and Day"	Karyn Kusama	Steven Levenson	November 6, 2016	0.463
Masters learns that Louise has fallen off the wagon. Johnson is distraught to hear that her parents' marriage is crumbling. Libby and Bram get caught in traffic. Nancy lies to Art regarding her pregnancy.
46	10	"The Eyes of God"	Michael Apted	Michelle Ashford	November 13, 2016	0.457
Series finale. Masters and Johnson announce their engagement. Nancy's competing business venture is exposed. Masters and Johnson signal to their publisher that they are open to the study of conversion therapy, although their first "success" story appears to be anything but. Libby leaves for California.

== Reception ==
The fourth season has received generally positive reviews from critics. It has a Metacritic score of 70 out of 100 based on 5 reviews.
