= Pilot (Masters of Sex) =

- Masters of Sex episode
- Episode no.: Season 1 Episode 1
- Directed by: John Madden
- Written by: Michelle Ashford
- Original air date: September 29, 2013
- Running time: 61 minutes

Guest appearances
- Beau Bridges as Barton Scully; Heléne Yorke as Jane Martin; Annaleigh Ashford as Betty DiMello; Roslyn Ruff as Josephine May; Margo Martindale as Miss Horchow

Episode chronology
← Previous —	Next → "Race to Space"
- Masters of Sex (season 1)

"Pilot" is the first episode of the first season of the American period drama television series Masters of Sex. It originally aired on September 29, 2013, in the United States on Showtime. The episode was written by series creator Michelle Ashford and directed by John Madden. The series is based on Thomas Maier's biography Masters of Sex: The Life and Times of William Masters and Virginia Johnson, the Couple Who Taught America How to Love.

== Plot ==
The series opens in October 1956 at Washington University in St. Louis where Bill Masters (Michael Sheen) is honored for his work in obstetric surgery. While making a speech, Bill states that he has to go. Later, he watches through a peephole as Betty DiMello (Annaleigh Ashford), a prostitute whom he hired, has sex with Ernie (Steve Rosen). Afterwards, Bill talks with Betty at a bar where they discuss her sexual response. She tells him she faked her orgasm, a practice which Bill is unfamiliar with.

A young doctor, Ethan Haas (Nicholas D'Agosto) speaks to Bill about a new female employee in their department who is going through a divorce. Bill tells him that he is getting support from Scully (Beau Bridges) about presenting his research to the board. Ethan is skeptical and Bill states that the project will be conducted in secrecy. Later that night, Bill comes home to his wife Libby (Caitlin FitzGerald). They are having trouble conceiving. Ethan drives Virginia E. Johnson (Lizzy Caplan) home where he makes a pass at her. She performs oral sex on him off-screen.

Virginia interviews for the position of Bill's new secretary. She reveals to him that she has been divorced twice and has two children. She tells him that she believes sex and love can be completely separate. Virginia signs up for sociology classes. Scully tells Bill that he didn't present his project to the board and that he'll be labeled a pervert. Bill tells Virginia that his wife is coming in to join his cervical cap trial to help them conceive. After sleeping together, Ethan tells Virginia that it's because of Bill's low sperm count that he and his wife are unable to conceive.

Bill brings Betty in to begin his new study, where she reveals to him that she's gay. Virginia recruits Jane (Heléne Yorke) to take part in the study. Bill convinces Scully to watch as the young woman uses a dildo (fixed with a miniature camera) and masturbates. Bill tries to convince Scully to submit his proposal to the board. When he is reluctant, Bill threatens to quit. In his office later that night, Bill and Virginia wait for Scully's call. Bill tells her of his frustration with everyone being embarrassed and guilty by the discussion of sex and that it is the “beginning of life”. Scully calls them before they leave with his approval.

At a benefit, Bill and Virginia recruit Austin Langham (Teddy Sears), a promiscuous doctor, to take part in their study. Ethan berates Virginia for spending so much time with Bill and ignoring him. She tells him they're just friends and while they argue, he hits her, giving her a bruise on her face. The next day Bill and Virginia watch and monitor Langham and Jane as they have sex.

Bill tells Virginia that they should avoid any potential transference between them and their patients. He suggests that they should have sex with each other to interpret the data first-hand, which Virginia asks him for the weekend to think about.

== Production ==
Masters of Sex was picked up for a first season consisting of 12 episodes on June 11, 2012. "Pilot" premiered on September 29, 2013. The episode was written by series creator Michelle Ashford and directed by John Madden.

Prop master Jeffrey Johnson designed "Ulysses," a transparent dildo with attached camera first seen in the pilot episode, from scratch.

On September 16, 2013, Showtime made the pilot episode available to watch online before the official premiere.

== Reception ==
Approximately one million people viewed the pilot episode before its Showtime premiere. The episode was watched by approximately 1.4 million people upon its debut.

For her performance in this episode, Lizzy Caplan was nominated for a Primetime Emmy Award for Outstanding Lead Actress in a Drama Series. Michelle Ashford was nominated at the 2014 Writers Guild of America Award for Television: Episodic Drama.

== Deviations from Maier's biography ==
Sarah Hughes of The Guardian notes that participants in Masters and Johnson's study "wore pillowcases with eyeholes on their heads"; writer Michelle Ashford didn't include that detail in her adaptation because "they made the actors look like Ku Klux Klan members".
