= Race to Space (Masters of Sex) =

- Masters of Sex episode
- Episode no.: Season 1 Episode 2
- Directed by: Michael Dinner
- Written by: Michelle Ashford
- Original air date: October 6, 2013
- Running time: 54 minutes

Guest appearances
- Beau Bridges as Scully; Heléne Yorke as Jane Martin; Annaleigh Ashford as Betty DiMello; Brian Howe as Sam; Elizabeth Dennehy; Rae Foster as Dottie; April Parker Jones as Mrs. Katcher; Ruby Lewis as Connie; Nicholle Tom as Maureen; Ellen Wroe as Ginger

Episode chronology
← Previous "Pilot"	Next → "Standard Deviation"
- Masters of Sex (season 1)

"Race to Space" is the second episode of the first season of the American period drama television series Masters of Sex. It aired on October 6, 2013 in the United States on Showtime.

== Plot ==
While getting her children ready for school, Virginia Johnson (Lizzy Caplan) considers how she will tell William Masters (Michael Sheen) that she has declined his proposal that they have sex with each other for their study from the previous episode. When she arrives at work, Bill tells her that Scully (Beau Bridges) has canceled their research because they were studying couples. Bill berates her for sleeping with Ethan Haas (Nicholas D'Agosto), as he assumes it was Haas who told Scully, and fires her. Virginia then receives a call that her son has been suspended from school for spitting on his teacher.

Bill moves the study to a brothel, with the help of Betty (Annaleigh Ashford), and compensates the participating prostitutes with double their regular salary. Betty asks him for a job at the hospital and she is hired as a receptionist. Virginia begs Bill for her job back, but he is unresponsive. Dr. Langham (Teddy Sears) and Jane (Heléne Yorke) learn that the study has been canceled in the hospital, which disappoints Jane, who felt that she was a part of something important. Langham suggests they continue to sleep together regardless.

At the brothel, Bill instructs the prostitutes on how the study will be conducted, but he is interrupted by police officers, who arrest him and the girls. Later, when his wife Libby (Caitlin FitzGerald) drives him home, he tries to explain that he was doing work at the brothel. Meanwhile, Ethan sleeps with a nurse and tries to convince her to perform oral sex on him like Virginia did, but she is uncomfortable with it and he drives her home. Virginia puts her son to bed, and he asks her to read the last issue of a Race to Space comic with him, but she has to work. She goes to the brothel, where she convinces some reluctant girls to take part in the study, stating that they know more about sex than anyone.

Betty asks Bill to reverse her tubal ligation, which Bill strongly declines to do. He asks Virginia to speak with her, in the hope that she will change Betty's mind. Libby asks Bill if he likes watching people have sex at work and volunteers to masturbate in front of him, which makes him uncomfortable, and he asks her to stop. The next morning, she convinces him to bring back Ethan as her doctor. In his office, Bill imagines Virginia accepting his request. Virginia speaks to Betty about her request to Bill, and Betty tells her that she met a wealthy man who’d like to marry her. Virginia asks Bill to consider performing the procedure. She tells him that he needs her for the study, and asks if she’s rehired, to which Bill tells her that she has her job tomorrow, but after that, he is uncertain. Inside, Virginia’s babysitter tells her that she and Virginia’s son read the Race to Space comic, upsetting her. In the final scene, Virginia reads the comic alone.

== Production ==
The episode was written by series creator Michelle Ashford and directed by Michael Dinner.

== Reception ==
In its original American broadcast, "Race to Space" was seen by an estimated 1.09 million viewers. "Race to Space" grew an overall nine percent from the pilot episode.

Sonia Saraiya of The A.V. Club gave the episode a B+ grade, commenting "...the show is still wickedly funny and awkward and touching in ways that feel thrilling and unexpected. This episode is a necessary step for even a great show. Let’s see how it pays off." Alan Sepinwall of HitFix called "Race to Space" a "very impressive second episode."
