= Manhigh (Masters of Sex) =

- Masters of Sex episode
- Episode no.: Season 1 Episode 12
- Directed by: Michael Dinner
- Written by: Michelle Ashford
- Original air date: December 15, 2013
- Running time: 58 minutes

Guest appearances
- Beau Bridges as Barton Scully; Julianne Nicholson as Dr. Lillian DePaul; Heléne Yorke as Jane Martin; Kevin Christy as Lester Linden; Garrett M. Brown as Chancellor Fitzhugh; Jason Kravits; James Eckhouse as Doctor; Robert Joy as Dr. Ellenberg; Allison Janney as Margaret Scully

Episode chronology
← Previous "Phallic Victories"	Next → "Parallax"
- Masters of Sex (season 1)

"Manhigh" is the twelfth episode and the season finale of the first season of the American period drama television series Masters of Sex. It premiered on December 15, 2013 in the United States on Showtime.

== Plot ==
William Masters (Michael Sheen) prepares to present the results of the study to the hospital. Ethan Haas, (Nicholas D'Agosto) after leaving the hospital, looks for a new job in California. Margaret Scully (Allison Janney) confronts Barton (Beau Bridges) about his sexuality, where he reveals that he fell in love with only one man in his life, when he was 18. Attempting to reconcile with Margaret, Barton tells her that he is to undergo aversion therapy. Bill speaks to Barton about his upcoming presentation where he attempts to salvage their relationship after blackmailing him previously about his sexuality.

Margaret visits a doctor who tells her of the treatment Barton is to receive, which includes electroconvulsive therapy, with possible side effects including memory loss. Jane Martin (Heléne Yorke) attempts to convince Bill to invite Virginia (Lizzy Caplan) to the presentation because of her contributions to the study, but before he can, Virginia meets him in the hallway to wish him luck.

Bill finally presents his findings from the study to the board members and hospital employees. It goes well up until he shows footage of Jane's vaginal canal and of Virginia masturbating, which outrages members of the audience and his presentation is shut down. Later, Bill fumes of the jealousy of his co-workers to Barton, who promises to stick by him.

Virginia and her son watch Major David G. Simons ascend 101,516 feet (30,942 m) in a balloon for Project Manhigh. Libby (Caitlin FitzGerald) asks Bill about who was masturbating in the film he presented, seemingly believing it to be Virginia. Bill implies that it was not and tells her that the participant's identity is confidential. Margaret tells Barton that she does not want him to go through with the aversion treatments and tells him that there is still love between them.

Barton informs Bill that they are both to be fired for his actions. He tells Bill that he always envied him and assures him that he will have no problem finding another job. Ethan calls Virginia from California and tells her that he received a job offer and wants her and her children to move with him. He asks her to marry him and gives her time to decide. Bill and Barton are in the process of being fired by Chancellor Fitzhugh (Garrett M. Brown), who tells Bill that his presentation was pornography and inappropriate. Bill saves Barton's job by berating him in front of Fitzhugh, acting as if Barton had no idea the study was being conducted. Fitzhugh has Barton fire Bill. Libby soon goes into labor, cannot contact Bill, and has her baby, but does not phone Bill after the birth and holds the baby. Bill and Barton go for a drink, where Bill tells him that they did not both need to lose their jobs. Barton tells him of his plans to go through with the aversion therapy, despite Margaret's protests.

Late at night, Bill shows up at Virginia's house. Standing at the door in the rain, he speaks of his disappointment that their work is finished at the hospital, and she mentions that he put her name on the study and Bill tells her she has earned it. He then says that he has nothing to offer her but the truth and tells Virginia that he cannot live without her.

== Production ==
The episode was written by series creator Michelle Ashford and directed by Michael Dinner.

== Reception ==
In its original American broadcast, "Manhigh" was seen by an estimated 1.21 million viewers. The A.V. Club said of the episode "Upon finishing "Manhigh," I had just one thought: I’ve been waiting for this episode since the beginning of the season. “Manhigh” is a great episode—an episode that, I think, shows all of the potential of Masters Of Sex, in one short hour." Alan Sepinwall of HitFix gave the episode a positive review, complimenting Sheen's performance.
