= List of awards and nominations received by Masters of Sex =

Masters of Sex awards and nominations
Awards and nominations
Award	Wins	Nominations
American Film Institute Awards	1	1
Critics' Choice Television Awards	2	7
Golden Globe Awards	0	2
Primetime Emmy Awards	1	11
Satellite Awards	0	5
Writers Guild of America Award	0	2

Totals (Note: Certain award groups do not simply award one winner. They acknowledge several different recipients, have runners-up, and have third place. Since this is a specific recognition and is different from losing an award, runner-up mentions are considered wins in this award tally. For simplification and to avoid errors, each award in this list has been presumed to have had a prior nomination.)
- Wins: 4
- Nominations: 28

Masters of Sex, an American drama television series that debuted on Showtime on September 29, 2013, received many awards and nominations during its run. The series stars Michael Sheen and Lizzy Caplan.

== Awards and nominations ==
Awards and nominations received by Modern Family
Award	Year	Category	Nominee(s)	Result	Ref.
American Film Institute Awards	2013	Television Program of the Year	Masters of Sex	Won	
Critics' Choice Television Awards	2013	Most Exciting New Series	Masters of Sex	Won	
Critics' Choice Television Awards	2014	Best Drama Series	Masters of Sex	Nominated	
Critics' Choice Television Awards	2014	Best Actress in a Drama Series	Lizzy Caplan	Nominated	
Critics' Choice Television Awards	2014	Best Actor in a Drama Series	Michael Sheen	Nominated	
Critics' Choice Television Awards	2014	Best Guest Performer in a Drama Series	Allison Janney	Won	
Critics' Choice Television Awards	2014	Best Guest Performer in a Drama Series	Beau Bridges	Nominated	
Critics' Choice Television Awards	2015	Best Guest Performer in a Drama Series	Julianne Nicholson	Nominated	
Golden Globe Awards	2014	Best Television Series – Drama	Masters of Sex	Nominated	
Golden Globe Awards	2014	Best Performance by an Actor in a Drama Series	Michael Sheen	Nominated	
Primetime Emmy Awards	2014	Outstanding Lead Actress in a Drama Series	Lizzy Caplan	Nominated	
Primetime Emmy Awards	2014	Outstanding Guest Actor in a Drama Series	Beau Bridges (for "Manhigh")	Nominated	
Primetime Emmy Awards	2014	Outstanding Guest Actress in a Drama Series	Allison Janney (for "Brave New World")	Won	
Primetime Emmy Awards	2014	Outstanding Main Title Design	Leanne Dare, art director; Yi-Jen Liu, designer; Jon Forsman, animator; Gabriel Britz, editor	Nominated	
Primetime Emmy Awards	2014	Outstanding Art Direction for a Period Series, Miniseries or a Movie (Single-Camera)	Andrew Jackness, production designer; Kevin Rupnik, art director; Ellen Christiansen, set decorator (for "Pilot")	Nominated	
Primetime Emmy Awards	2015	Outstanding Guest Actor in a Drama Series	Beau Bridges (for "Parallax")	Nominated	
Primetime Emmy Awards	2015	Outstanding Guest Actress in a Drama Series	Allison Janney (for "Parallax")	Nominated	
Primetime Emmy Awards	2015	Outstanding Art Direction for a Period Series, Miniseries or a Movie (Single-Camera)	Michael Wylie, production designer; Elizabeth H. Gray, art director; Halina Siwolop, set decorator (for "Blackbird")	Nominated	
Primetime Emmy Awards	2016	Outstanding Guest Actress in a Drama Series	Allison Janney (for "Matters of Gravity")	Nominated	
Primetime Emmy Awards	2016	Outstanding Production Design for a Narrative Period Program (One Hour or More)	Elizabeth H. Gray, production designer; Valerie Green, art director; Halina Siwolop, set decorator (for "The Excitement of Release", "Surrogates", "Party of Four")	Nominated	
Primetime Emmy Awards	2017	Outstanding Production Design for a Narrative Period Program (One Hour or More)	Elizabeth H. Gray, production designer; Samantha Englender, art director; Halina Siwolop, set decorator (for "Freefall", "Inventory", "The Pleasure Protocol")	Nominated	
Satellite Awards	2014	Best Television Series, Drama	Masters of Sex	Nominated	
Satellite Awards	2014	Best Actor in a Series, Drama	Michael Sheen	Nominated	
Satellite Awards	2014	Best Actress in a Series, Drama	Lizzy Caplan	Nominated	
Satellite Awards	2015	Best Actor in a Series, Drama	Michael Sheen	Nominated	
Satellite Awards	2015	Best Actress in a Series, Drama	Lizzy Caplan	Nominated	
Writers Guild of America Awards	2014	Television: New Series	Michelle Ashford, Tyler Bensinger, Michael Cunningham, Lynnie Greene, Richard Levine, Amy Lippman, Sam Shaw, and Noelle Valdivia	Nominated	
Writers Guild of America Awards	2014	Television: Episodic Drama	Michelle Ashford (for "Pilot")	Nominated	
