= Standard Deviation (Masters of Sex) =

- Masters of Sex episode
- Episode no.: Season 1 Episode 3
- Directed by: Lawrence Trilling
- Written by: Sam Shaw
- Original air date: October 13, 2013
- Running time: 52 minutes

Guest appearances
- Beau Bridges as Barton Scully; Julianne Nicholson as Dr. Lillian DePaul; Annaleigh Ashford as Betty DiMello; Finn Wittrock as Dale; Mae Whitman as College student; Greg Grunberg as The Pretzel King; Lauren Weedman; Rae Foster as Dottie; Nicholle Tom as Maureen; Ellen Wroe as Ginger; Bobby Campo as Carl; David Ury; Marlane Barnes as Gladys; Jennifer Holloway as Ramona

Episode chronology
← Previous "Race to Space"	Next → "Thank You for Coming"
- Masters of Sex (season 1)

"Standard Deviation" is the third episode of the first season of the American period drama television series Masters of Sex. It originally aired on October 13, 2013 in the United States on Showtime.

== Plot ==
In 1945, William Masters (Michael Sheen) shows Barton Scully (Beau Bridges) an experiment he is conducting with rabbits. He then reveals to Scully that he wants to stop studying animal sexuality and move on to humans, claiming that everyone, including Bill himself, is clueless about sex. Time transitions back to February 1957, where an engaged college student (Mae Whitman) is consulting Bill about contraception. Not even aware of where her cervix is, she is clearly uneducated about sex.

Virginia Johnson (Lizzy Caplan) eagerly tells Bill about the prostitutes from the brothel that have agreed to partake in their study. She is disappointed by Bill treating her like his secretary, when she prefers to be considered his assistant. Betty (Annaleigh Ashford) confronts Bill about his refusal to reverse her tubal ligation. He eventually agrees to do it, but still believes it is not a good idea.

At the brothel, Bill and Virginia watch multiple prostitutes masturbate, one of which fakes her orgasm. The next day, Ethan Haas (Nicholas D'Agosto) comes to the aid of a heavily pregnant woman. Meanwhile, Bill introduces Dr. Lillian DePaul (Julianne Nicholson) to Virginia, who also treats Virginia like a secretary. Ethan tells Master's wife Libby (Caitlin FitzGerald) that the pregnant woman he was with is having quadruplets. He becomes interested as Libby tells him about the Badgett quadruplets, who, alongside the hospital that delivered them, received much publicity. He then goes to Scully and asks to be the doctor to deliver the babies. Scully reluctantly agrees, but due to his lack of experience, requests that Bill be in the delivery room with him. Back at the brothel, Bill tells Virginia that they are going to need men in the study.

During Betty's surgery, Bill makes a doctor scrub out after he makes a degrading joke. He later discovers a complication and must discontinue the operation. Coming out of the operating room, he meets Betty's fiancée. Afterwards, he informs Betty that she has salpingitis and will be unable to get pregnant. He and Virginia meet men that have signed up for the study, who are soon revealed to be homosexual. Bill watches two of the men have sex, then comes to the conclusion that using "outliers" such as prostitutes and homosexuals will keep them from gathering accurate data. Another flashback shows Scully telling Bill that he needs to go into obstetrics at a teaching hospital, along with a perfect image, which includes a wife and kids.

One night at the hospital, a reporter from the newspaper begins to interview Bill about the quadruplets, which Bill was unaware of. He then goes to Scully and demands he be the one to deliver them. He eventually does while Ethan angrily watches, and all four babies survive the surgery. Virginia listens as multiple secretaries mock Dr. DePaul. She defends her, claiming she is educated and skilled, but the other women still do not take her seriously. Later, she visits Libby, who is on bed rest. She sobs about her infertility and tells Virginia to give away the baby clothes her mother bought her. Unable to see her so distraught, Virginia finally tells her that Bill's low sperm count is the reason they haven't been able to conceive.

As Betty is going home from the hospital, she tells Virginia that she is not going to tell her fiancée about her condition, saying that the only way a woman can get anywhere in life is with the help of a man. She then tells Virginia that Bill is in love with her, which she denies. Libby finds out from Ethan that she is pregnant. Virginia tells Bill that the way he treats her confuses her, to which he responds that she is his secretary. In Scully's office, Bill tells him that the study must be moved back to the hospital, blackmailing him with the new information that Scully himself is homosexual. The study is scheduled to resume. Bill comes home to his wife, who sits him down to tell him she's pregnant.

== Production ==
"Standard Deviation" was written by Sam Shaw and directed by Lawrence Trilling.

The episode included vintage condoms and a diaphragm sizing kit obtained by prop master Jeffrey Johnson.

== Reception ==
In its original American broadcast, "Standard Deviation" was seen by an estimated 1.04 million viewers, down slightly from the previous week's 1.09 million viewers.

Alan Sepinwall of HitFix called "Standard Deviation" a strong episode, and cited Sheen's performance as a highlight.
