= St. Louis Daily Record =

Newspaper of St Louis, Missouri, USA

The St. Louis Daily Record is a newspaper in St. Louis, Missouri published by Missouri Lawyers Media. It was founded in 1890. Its specialty is legal news. Archival copies through at least February 2004 are on microfilm at the St. Louis Public Library.

Virginia E. Johnson was a business writer for the St. Louis Daily Record before becoming a noted sexologist with scientist William Masters.
