= Robert C. Kolodny =

Robert C. Kolodny (born 1944) is an American writer about human sexuality and related topics.

== Early life and career ==
Born in New York City as the eldest child of Maxwell H. Kolodny and Selma B. Kolodny, he attended Edgemont High School in Scarsdale, New York, and Columbia University (B.A., 1965), where he studied with Moses Hadas and Susan Sontag, with whom he maintained a lifelong friendship. He then went on to Washington University School of Medicine in St. Louis (M.D., 1969), where he co-founded the school's first course on medical ethics in 1969 and studied with noted child psychiatrist E. James Anthony, who had trained under Piaget and Anna Freud. Kolodny did his internship and residency at Harvard University (at what is now the Beth Israel-Deaconess Hospital) and a fellowship in Endocrinology and Metabolism at Barnes Hospital in St. Louis. As the first medical student to study with William H. Masters and Virginia E. Johnson at what was then called the Reproductive Biology Research Foundation in St. Louis in 1968–69 (subsequently renamed the Masters & Johnson Institute in December 1978), Kolodny returned to this research institution after his training in 1972 and eventually became Associate Director, Director of Training and Head of the Endocrine Research Section of the Masters & Johnson Institute. His research focused primarily on the effects of drugs (both illicit and prescription) on sexual function, the effects of chronic illnesses such as diabetes, cancer, and hypertension on sexual well-being, and studies of process and outcome of sex therapy, as well as topics in infertility. With his colleague Joan Bauman, Ph.D., Kolodny also conducted research seeking to identify the biochemical components (short chain aliphatic fatty acids) in human vaginal secretions that serve as pheromones in other mammalian species

Kolodny is Medical Director and Chairman of the Board of the Behavioral Medicine Institute in New Canaan, Connecticut. He has served as a member of the Board of Advocates of Planned Parenthood for more than a quarter century. In 1983, he received the National Award from the Society for the Scientific Study of Sex in recognition of his distinguished career. He has been a visiting professor or guest lecturer at institutions such as The Smithsonian, the National Institutes of Health, Massachusetts General Hospital, and the UCLA Neuropsychiatric Institute, and has conducted postgraduate medical education programs for tens of thousands of physicians and other health care professionals. Kolodny has been a featured guest on hundreds of national television shows, from Good Morning America and the David Susskind Show to Larry King Live, Nightline, Crossfire, and the MacNeil-Lehrer Report.

In 1997, he joined the board of directors of Advanced Viral Research Corporation, a biotechnology company specializing in peptide nucleic acids.

== Published works ==
Kolodny co-authored 16 books for both professional and lay audiences, including 14 books written with Masters and Johnson, including:

- Ethical Issues in Sex Therapy and Research (Little, Brown, Vol. I, 1977; Vol. II, 1980)
- Textbook of Sexual Medicine
- Textbook of Human Sexuality for Nurses
- Human Sexuality, a college textbook which has been published in five editions
- Masters and Johnson on Sex and Human Loving (Little, Brown, 1985), which won an award as one of the Best Books on Science and Technology of the Year
- Crisis: Heterosexual Behavior in the Age of AIDS (Grove Press, 1988)
- Biological Foundations of Human Sexuality (1993)
- Heterosexuality (Harper, Collins, 1994).
- How to Survive Your Adolescent's Adolescence (Robert. C. Kolodny, Nancy J. Kolodny, and Thomas E. Bratter, Little, Brown: Boston, 1984)
- Smart Choices (also about adolescence) (Robert C. Kolodny, Nancy J. Kolodny, Thomas E. Bratter, and Cheryl Deep, Little, Brown: Boston, 1986)

Kolodny wrote a detailed defense of Masters and Johnson's sex therapy statistics following an attack on Masters and Johnson's credibility by the psychologists Bernie Zilbergeld and Michael Evans in Psychology Today in 1981. In addition to providing updated and expanded details on how statistics were compiled at the Masters & Johnson Institute, Kolodny presented new data on psychiatric diagnoses in their sex therapy clients from 1971 to 1979 as well as further information about details of the Masters & Johnson Institute's telephonic follow-up of sex therapy clients. He also clarified the fact that the Masters and Johnson program was not obtaining its outstanding rates of success because of screening out complex or difficult cases, indicating that fewer than one out of 50 applicant couples were turned down for therapy.
