= Masters and Johnson Institute =

US research organization

- Formation: 1964 (62 years ago)
- Dissolved: 1994 (32 years ago)
- Purpose: Sexology research
- Location: 4910 Forest Park Avenue, St. Louis, Missouri, United States
- Coordinates: 38.638719°N 90.263011°W
- Key people: William H. Masters; Virginia E. Johnson
- Formerly called: Reproductive Biology Research Foundation (1964–1978)

The Masters and Johnson Institute (1964–1994) was the clinical and research foundation of sexologist duo Masters and Johnson. Located in St. Louis, Missouri, the institute was established to study human sexuality with particular emphasis on the anatomy and physiology of human sexual response and the diagnosis and treatment of sexual dysfunctions.

Founded as the Reproductive Biology Research Foundation, the organization changed its name to the Masters and Johnson Institute in 1978; it closed in 1994.

== History ==
After William H. Masters hired Virginia E. Johnson in 1957 as a research assistant on a project in human sexuality, they originally worked together in the Department of Obstetrics and Gynecology at Washington University in St. Louis, before continuing to create an independent research institution at 4910 Forest Park Avenue in the Central Medical Building in St. Louis in 1964, deliberately named the Reproductive Biology Research Foundation (rather than using the word "sex" in its title) to keep their work out of the limelight. The foundation did, in fact, conduct studies of conception, contraception, and infertility, although the major focus of its work was on advancing the scientific study of human sexuality.

Their work, which pioneered human sexuality as a science, was primarily conducted at this institute. They published books including Human Sexual Response (1966; OCLC 318151909) and Human Sexual Inadequacy (1970; OCLC 299881470).

Masters and Johnson married in 1971 and by 1978, at the urging of their board of directors, agreed to rename their foundation Masters & Johnson Institute believing that the institute's work might capitalize to a degree on their personal fame.

At the height of its operations, the institute included a multi-disciplinary staff of medical professionals (including specialists from the fields of obstetrics and gynecology, internal medicine and endocrinology, psychiatry, and nursing) as well as behavioral clinicians (including clinical psychologists, social workers, theologians, and pastoral counselors) and a dedicated biochemical and endocrine laboratory.

The institute conducted a wide range of workshop and seminar programs for health care professionals both in St. Louis and across the country and also ran a full-time training program for sex therapists. In addition to the research and educational work it conducted, and its world-renowned therapy program, the institute also spearheaded a drive during the 1970s to establish ethical guidelines for sex educators, therapists, and researchers.

The institute was closed when Masters retired in 1994.

== Popular culture ==
The founders and their institute inspired the Showtime TV series Masters of Sex.
