= Masters and Johnson =

1950s pioneer sex research partnership

Masters and Johnson in 1965

The Masters and Johnson research team, composed of William H. Masters (1915–2001) and Virginia E. Johnson (1925–2013), pioneered research into the nature of human sexual response and the diagnosis and treatment of sexual disorders and dysfunctions from 1957 until the 1990s.

The work of Masters and Johnson began in the Department of Obstetrics and Gynecology at Washington University in St. Louis and was continued at the independent not-for-profit research institution they founded in St. Louis in 1964, originally called the Reproductive Biology Research Foundation and renamed the Masters and Johnson Institute in 1978.

In the initial phase of Masters and Johnson's studies, from 1957 until 1965, they recorded some of the first laboratory data on the anatomy and physiology of human sexual response based on direct observation of 382 women and 312 men in what they conservatively estimated to be "10,000 complete cycles of sexual response". Their findings, particularly on the nature of female sexual arousal (for example, describing the mechanisms of vaginal lubrication and debunking the earlier widely held notion that vaginal lubrication originated from the cervix) and orgasm (showing that the physiology of orgasmic response was identical whether stimulation was clitoral or vaginal, and, separately, proving that some women were capable of being multiorgasmic), dispelled many long-standing misconceptions. They jointly wrote two classic texts in the field, Human Sexual Response and Human Sexual Inadequacy, published in 1966 and 1970 respectively. Both of these books were best-sellers and were translated into more than thirty languages.

The team has been inducted into the St. Louis Walk of Fame. Additionally, they are the focus of a television series called Masters of Sex for Showtime based on the 2009 biography by author Thomas Maier.

== Research work ==
Masters and Johnson met in 1957 when William Masters hired Virginia Johnson as a research assistant to undertake a comprehensive study of human sexuality. According to author Thomas Maier, as part of their clinical research Masters and Johnson observed paid volunteers engaging in sexual activity while hooked to wires in their lab. At Masters's request, Masters and Johnson engaged in intercourse as subjects of their own study and eventually became lovers. Maier stated that Masters spent more time in the lab with Johnson than he did with his wife Libby and their children, and also spent summer vacations together with Johnson. By the time Masters divorced his first wife in 1971, associates believed that he and Johnson essentially lived together and worked and traveled together seven days a week. Masters and Johnson married in 1971 but then later divorced on March 18, 1993, in the Circuit Court of St. Louis County; they nonetheless continued to work together professionally.

Previously, the study of human sexuality (sexology) had been a largely neglected field of study due to the restrictive social conventions of the time, with prostitution as a notable exception.

Alfred Kinsey and colleagues at Indiana University had previously published two volumes on sexual behavior in the human male and female (known as the Kinsey Reports), in 1948 and 1953 respectively, both of which had been revolutionary and controversial in their time. Kinsey's work, however, had mainly investigated the frequency with which certain behaviors occurred in the population and was based on personal interviews, not on laboratory observation. In contrast, Masters and Johnson set about to study the structure, psychology, and physiology of sexual behavior through observing and measuring masturbation and sexual intercourse in the laboratory.

Initially, participants used in their experiments were prostitutes. Masters and Johnson explained that they were a socially isolated group of people, they were knowledgeable about sex, and that they were willing to cooperate with the study. Of the 145 prostitutes who participated, only a select few were further evaluated for their genital anatomy and their physiological responses. In later studies, however, Masters and Johnson recruited 382 women and 312 men from the community. The vast majority of participants were white, had higher education levels, and most participants were married couples.

As well as recording some of the first physiological data from the human body and sex organs during sexual excitation, they also framed their findings and conclusions in language that espoused sex as a healthy and natural activity that could be enjoyed as a source of pleasure and intimacy.

The era in which their research was conducted permitted the use of methods that had not been attempted before, and that have not been attempted since: "[M]en and women were designated as 'assigned partners' and arbitrarily paired with each other to create 'assigned couples'."

== Four-stage model of the sexual response ==
One of the most enduring and important aspects of their work has been the four stage model of sexual response, which they described as the human sexual response cycle and defined as:

- Excitement phase (initial arousal)
- Plateau phase (at full arousal, but not yet at orgasm)
- Orgasm
- Resolution phase (after orgasm)

Their model shows no difference between Sigmund Freud's purported categories of "vaginal orgasm" and "clitoral orgasm": the physiological response was identical, even if the stimulation was in a different place.

Masters and Johnson's findings also revealed that men undergo a refractory period following orgasm during which they are not able to ejaculate again, whereas there is no refractory period in women: this makes women capable of multiple orgasm. They also were the first to describe the phenomenon of the rhythmic contractions of orgasm in both sexes occurring initially in 0.8 second intervals and then gradually slowing in both speed and intensity.

== Sexual response in the aging person ==
Masters and Johnson were the first to conduct research on the sexual responsiveness of older adults, finding that given a state of reasonably good health and the availability of an interested and interesting partner, there was no absolute age at which sexual abilities disappeared. While they noted that there were specific changes to the patterns of male and female sexual responses with aging – for example, it takes older men longer to become aroused and they typically require more direct genital stimulation, and the speed and amount of vaginal lubrication tends to diminish with age as well – they noted that many older men and women are perfectly capable of excitement and orgasm well into their seventies and beyond, a finding that has been confirmed in population-based epidemiological research on sexual function in the elderly.

== Laboratory comparison of homosexual male versus homosexual female sex ==
Masters and Johnson randomly assigned two men into couples and two women into couples and then observed them having sex in the laboratory, at the Masters and Johnson Institute. They provided their observations in Homosexuality in Perspective:

Assigned male homosexual study subjects A, B, and C..., interacting in the laboratory with previously unknown male partners, did discuss procedural matters with these partners, but quite briefly. Usually, the discussion consisted of just a question or a suggestion, but often it was limited to nonverbal communicative expressions such as eye contact or hand movement, any of which usually proved sufficient to establish the protocol of partner interaction. No coaching or suggestions were made by the research team.

— p. 55

According to Masters and Johnson, this pattern differed in the female homosexual couples:

While initial stimulative activity tended to be on a mutual basis, in short order control of the specific sexual experience usually was assumed by one partner. The assumption of control was established without verbal communication and frequently with no obvious nonverbal direction, although on one occasion discussion as to procedural strategy continued even as the couple was interacting physically.

— p. 55

== Sexual dysfunction ==
Their research into the anatomy and physiology of sexual response was a springboard to developing a clinical approach to the treatment of sexual problems in a revolutionary manner. Prior to 1970, when they described their treatment program to the world for the first time, sexual dysfunctions such as premature ejaculation, impotence, vaginismus, and female frigidity had been generally treated by long-term (multi-year) psychotherapy or psychoanalysis with very low rates of success. Masters and Johnson revolutionized things by devising a form of rapid treatment (2 week) psychotherapy always involving a couple, rather than just an individual, working with a male-female therapist team that resulted in a success rate of more than 80%. This was strictly a talking therapy – couples in their sex therapy program were never observed in sexual activity.

== Treatment of homosexual behavior ==
From 1968 to 1977, the Masters and Johnson Institute ran a program to convert homosexuals to heterosexuality. This program reported a 71.6% success rate over a six-year treatment period. At the time of their earlier work, homosexuality was classified as a psychological disorder by the American Psychiatric Association, and such attempts to treat homosexuality were not unusual. This classification was repealed in 1973.

Thomas Maier stated "that Virginia Johnson had serious reservations about Masters' conversion theory, and she suspected that, at worst, the results of the study may have been fabricated by William Masters". Psychiatrist Robert C. Kolodny, a clinical associate of the Masters', also expressed reservations about the veracity of the findings in Masters' book on the topic and alleged that Masters had not kept files of the case studies cited in the book. Shortly before the book was published, he wrote Masters a two-page letter expressing Johnson's and Kolodny's reservations on the alleged successful reconversion findings and urging him to reconsider publication of the book, to no avail. As homosexuality was on the verge of being dropped from the Diagnostic and Statistical Manual of Mental Disorders (DSM), Masters's insistence on publishing the book proved to be tone-deaf and was shunned by book critics.

== Criticisms ==
Some sex researchers, Shere Hite in particular, have focused on understanding how individuals regard sexual experience and the meaning it holds for them. Hite has criticized Masters and Johnson's work for uncritically incorporating cultural attitudes on sexual behavior into their research; for example, her work concluded that the 70% of women who do not have orgasms through intercourse are able to achieve orgasm easily by masturbation. She, as well as Elisabeth Lloyd, have criticized Masters and Johnson's argument that enough clitoral stimulation to achieve orgasm should be provided by thrusting during intercourse, and the inference that the failure of this is a sign of female "sexual dysfunction". While not denying that both Kinsey and Masters and Johnson have made major contributions to sex research, she believes that people must understand the cultural and personal construction of sexual experience to make the research relevant to sexual behavior outside the laboratory. Hite's work has also been challenged for methodological defects.

Masters and Johnson's research methodology has been criticized. Paul Robinson argues that because many of their participants were sex workers, it is highly likely that these individuals have had more sexual experience and are more comfortable with sex and sexuality in general. He says that one must approach these results with caution, because the participants do not represent the general population. Other researchers have argued that Masters and Johnson eliminated same-sex attracted participants when studying the human sexual response cycle, which also limits the generalizability of their results.

Masters and Johnson have been criticized for studying sexual behaviors in the laboratory. While they attempted to make participants as comfortable as possible in the lab by giving them a "practice session" before their behavior was recorded, critics have argued that two people engaging in sexual activity in a lab is a different experience compared to being in the privacy and comfort of one's home. Another persistent critique was that despite her extensive years of clinical work, Virginia Johnson never earned a university degree and often did not correct those who referred to her in the press or in person as "Dr. Johnson".

== Television ==
Masters and Johnson appeared together on the NBC daily news program America Alive! in the second half of 1978, as authorities on the subject of sex.

== In popular culture ==
The American cable network Showtime debuted Masters of Sex, a dramatic television series based on the 2009 biography of the same name, on September 29, 2013. The series stars Michael Sheen as Masters and Lizzy Caplan as Johnson. (The same actors briefly portrayed "Masters and Johnson", as similar characters but in the present day, in The Simpsons episode "Kamp Krustier".)

== Publications ==
- Masters, W.H.; Johnson, V.E. (1966). Human Sexual Response. Toronto; New York: Bantam Books. ISBN 978-0-553-20429-2. 1981 edition ISBN 978-0553204292.
- Masters, W.H.; Johnson, V.E. (1970). Human Sexual Inadequacy. Toronto; New York: Bantam Books. ISBN 978-0-553-20699-9.
- Masters, W.H.; Johnson, V.E. (1974). The Pleasure Bond. Toronto; New York: Bantam Books. ISBN 978-0-553-20915-0.
- Masters, W.H.; Johnson, V.E. (1979). Homosexuality in Perspective. Toronto; New York: Bantam Books. ISBN 978-0-553-20809-2.
- Masters, W.H.; Johnson, V.E.; Kolodny, R.C (1988). Masters and Johnson on Sex and Human Loving. Little, Brown and Company. ISBN 978-0316501606.
- Masters, W.H.; Johnson, V.E.; Kolodny, R.C (1994). Heterosexuality. New York; London: HarperCollins. ISBN 978-0-7225-3027-6.
