= New York News =

American newspaper drama television series

- Genre: Drama
- Created by: Michelle Ashford
- Starring: Gregory Harrison; Melina Kanakaredes; Madeline Kahn; Kelli Williams; Mary Tyler Moore
- Composer: Shari Johanson
- Country of origin: United States
- Original language: English
- No. of seasons: 1
- No. of episodes: 13 (5 unaired)

Production
- Executive producers: Michelle Ashford; Ian Sander
- Producer: Nan Bernstein Freed
- Running time: 60 minutes (with commercials)
- Production companies: Sander/Moses Productions; Round Two Productions; Warner Bros. Television

Original release
- Network: CBS
- Release: September 28 – November 30, 1995

New York News is an American newspaper drama television series created by Michelle Ashford, which was broadcast in the United States by CBS from September 28 to November 30, 1995 as part of its 1995 fall lineup.

== Cast ==
- Gregory Harrison as Jack Reilly
- Melina Kanakaredes as Angela Villanova
- Madeline Kahn as Nan Chase
- Kelli Williams as Ellie
- Anthony DeSando as Tony Amato
- Kevin Chamberlin as Victor
- Joe Morton as Mitch Cotter
- Mary Tyler Moore as Louise Felcott

== Premise ==
New York News is the story of the fictional New York Reporter, a struggling tabloid in the US's largest, most competitive newspaper market, New York City. Major characters included Jack Reilly (Gregory Harrison), an old-style newspaperman (so old-style that he actually went sneaking around in a trench coat); Angela Villanova (Melina Kanakaredes), a young writer who seemingly alternated between admiring Reilly and being in love with him; Nan Chase (Madeline Kahn), a gossip columnist somewhat in the vein of Rona Barrett; and Tony Amato (Anthony DeSando), the paper's leading sports columnist.

Supervising all of these talented, high-strung people was Editor-in-Chief Louise Felcott (Mary Tyler Moore), the "Dragon", who kept the pressure up on these employees and others, including their immediate boss, Managing Editor Mitch Cotter (Joe Morton). The paper's budget cutting and the related attempt of ownership to sell it took their toll on Cotter, who suffered a minor heart attack in the early episodes.

Moore was reportedly very unhappy with how her character was written, as a tough, unsympathetic, and unglamourous woman who peered out at her subordinates through thick "Coke-bottle" glasses. She was reputedly in negotiations to get out of her contract to do the program when this was made unnecessary by CBS's cancellation of it due to low Nielsen ratings two months after its premiere.

== Episodes ==
No.	Title	Directed by	Written by	Original release date
1	"Pilot"	Michael Apted	Michelle Ashford	September 28, 1995
2	"Fun City"	John David Coles	Michelle Ashford	October 5, 1995
3	"Thin Line"	Unknown	Barbara Hall	October 8, 1995
4	"Broadway Joe"	Unknown	Eric Overmyer & Michelle Ashford	October 12, 1995
5	"Goodbye Gator"	Unknown	Velma Black & Barbara Hall	October 19, 1995
6	"A Question of Truth"	Unknown	Georgia Jeffries	November 2, 1995
7	"Welcome Back Cotter"	Unknown	Story by : Wayne Grigsby & Barbara Samuels; Teleplay by : Jack Orman	November 9, 1995
8	"You Thought the Pope Was Something"	Unknown	Michelle Ashford	November 30, 1995
9	"Cost of Living"	TBD	Barbara Hall	UNAIRED
10	"Yankee Glory"	TBD	Jack Orman	UNAIRED
11	"Past Imperfect"	TBD	Geoffrey Thomas George	UNAIRED
12	"Forgotten"	TBD	Juan Carlos Coto	UNAIRED
13	"The Using Game"	TBD	Mike McAlary	UNAIRED

== Nielsen ratings ==
Episode	Original air date	Rating/Share	Million viewers	Rank
1	September 28, 1995	7.1/11	9.9	70
2	October 5, 1995	6.1/9	8.6	65
3	October 8, 1995	6.8/11	9.1	56
4	October 12, 1995	6.0/9	8.2	73
5	October 19, 1995	6.5/10	8.8	69
6	November 2, 1995	6.8/10	9.1	76
7	November 9, 1995	5.5/9	7.5	86
8	November 30, 1995	5.9/9	7.8	88
