= A.T.F. =

1999 TV film directed by Dean Parisot

- Written by: Patricia Cornwell; Michelle Ashford
- Story by: Patricia Cornwell
- Directed by: Dean Parisot
- Starring: Kathy Baker; Amy Brenneman
- Music by: Wendy Blackstone
- Country of origin: United States
- Original language: English

Production
- Producers: Michelle Ashford; Patricia Cornwell; Tracy Fetterolf; Jeff Henry; David J. Latt; Dean Parisot; Larry Rapaport
- Cinematography: Jerzy Zieliński
- Editor: Ned Bastille
- Running time: 88 minutes
- Production companies: Round 2 Productions; Columbia TriStar Television

Original release
- Network: ABC
- Release: September 6, 1999

A.T.F. is a 1999 American television film directed by Dean Parisot and written by Patricia Cornwell and Michelle Ashford, based on a story by Cornwell. The film stars Kathy Baker and Amy Brenneman as ATF agents who work to infiltrate an armed militia, a group which the film describes as akin to the Branch Davidians, a religious group held off ATF agents and were later set siege to by the FBI in Waco, Texas, in the Waco Siege of 1993.

A.T.F. was produced by Round 2 Productions and Columbia TriStar Television as a television pilot for ABC, on which it aired on September 6, 1999.

== Plot ==
Following the infamous tragedy in Waco, Texas, in which the Bureau of Alcohol, Tobacco and Firearms (A.T.F.) found themselves in a battle with an armed militia, the organization, led by director Maggie Hale (Kathy Baker), finds itself in a new fight. Agent Robyn O'Brien (Amy Brenneman) goes undercover to infiltrate a militia selling illegal street-sweeper guns, dismissing Hale's orders to stay away. When O'Brien gets held prisoner inside the militia's compound, the A.T.F. is left with the decision to start another Waco and attack the militia, or come up with another way to save her.

== Cast ==
- Kathy Baker as A.T.F. Director Maggie Hale
- Amy Brenneman as Agent Robin O'Brien
- Vincent Angell as Agent Reeve Aquilar
- Michael O'Neill as Asst. A.T.F. Director Ben Walker
- Keith David as F.B.I Director Richard Long
- Mark Boone Junior as Jake Neill
- William Richert as Patrick McKennan
- Sarah Trigger as Carol
- John Philbin as Randy
- Raphael Sbarge as Director Hale's Assistant
- John Beasley as Secretary Robert Edwards
- Coby Bell as Agent Dinko Bates
- Sean Bridgers as Smitty

== See also ==
- Waco Siege
- List of television films produced for American Broadcasting Company
