= Carousel (2026 film) =

- Directed by: Rachel Lambert
- Written by: Rachel Lambert
- Produced by: Alex Saks; Bobby Daly Jr.; David Lipper; Chris Pine; Ian Gotler
- Starring: Chris Pine; Jenny Slate; Abby Ryder Fortson; Sam Waterston; Katey Sagal; Heléne Yorke; Jessica Harper; Jeffrey DeMunn
- Cinematography: Dustin Lane
- Edited by: Ryan Kendrick
- Music by: Dabney Morris
- Production companies: Latigo Films; Barry Linen Motion Pictures
- Release date: January 22, 2026 (Sundance Film Festival)
- Running time: 105 minutes
- Country: United States
- Language: English

Carousel is a 2026 American romantic drama film written and directed by Rachel Lambert. It stars Chris Pine, Jenny Slate, Abby Ryder Fortson, Sam Waterston, Katey Sagal, Heléne Yorke, Jessica Harper, and Jeffrey DeMunn.

== Cast ==
- Chris Pine as Noah
- Jenny Slate as Rebecca
- Abby Ryder Fortson as Maya
- Sam Waterston as Sam
- Katey Sagal as Noah’s mother
- Heléne Yorke
- Jessica Harper as Rebecca’s mother
- Jeffrey DeMunn as Rebecca’s father

== Production ==
In October 2025, principal photography had wrapped in Cleveland, Ohio, on a new romantic drama film, written and directed by Rachel Lambert, and Chris Pine, Jenny Slate, Abby Ryder Fortson, Sam Waterston, Katey Sagal, Heléne Yorke, Jessica Harper, and Jeffrey DeMunn rounding out the main cast.

== Release ==
Carousel premiered at the 2026 Sundance Film Festival in Park City and Salt Lake City, Utah on January 22, 2026.
