= Nicholas D'Agosto =

American actor (born 1980)

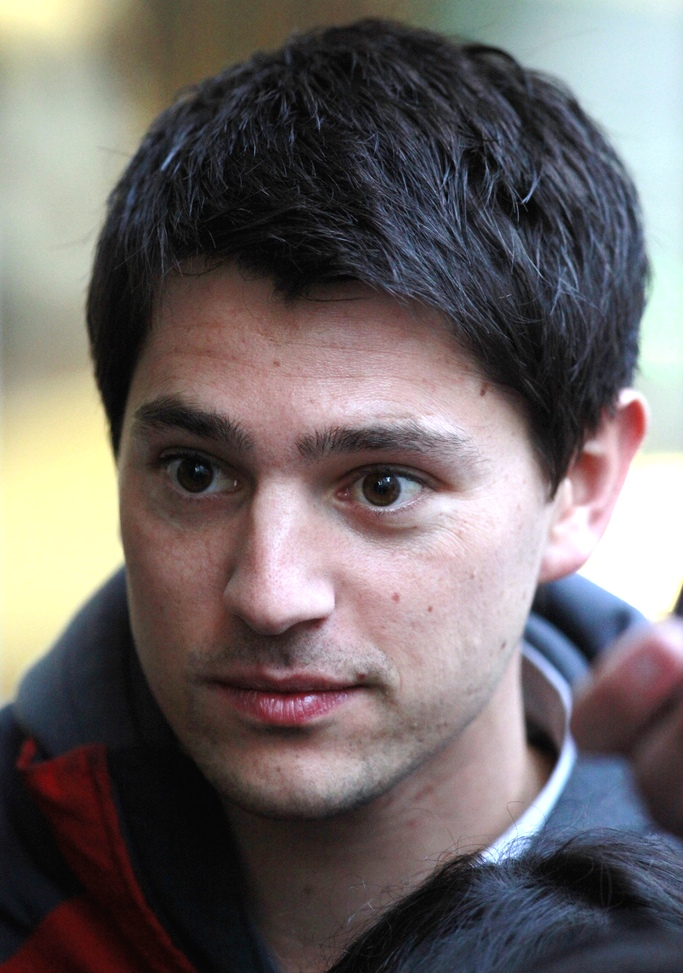
- D'Agosto filming Final Destination 5 in Vancouver, October 2010
- Born: April 17, 1980 (age 46); Omaha, Nebraska, U.S.
- Other name: Nick D'Agosto
- Education: Marquette University
- Occupation: Actor
- Years active: 1999–present
- Spouse: Andrea Bricco (m. 2015)
- Children: 1

Nicholas "Nick" D'Agosto (born April 17, 1980) is an American actor. He made his film debut with a supporting role in Election (1999). D'Agosto gained recognition with recurring roles as West Rosen on season 2 of the NBC superhero television series Heroes (2007) and Hunter on season 3 of the NBC sitcom The Office (2007).

After supporting roles in the films Rocket Science (2007) and Extreme Movie (2008), D'Agosto had his breakout with a starring role in the teen sex comedy film Fired Up! (2009). In the 2010s, D'Agosto had the lead role in the supernatural horror film Final Destination 5 (2011) and a supporting role in Dirty Girl (2010) before transitioning primarily to television. He had a main role as Dr. Ethan Haas on season 1 of the Showtime series Masters of Sex (2013) and had a recurring, later main, role as Harvey Dent on the Fox superhero series Gotham (2014–2016). In the late 2010s, he had a lead role as Josh Segal on the NBC sitcom Trial & Error (2017–2018).

== Early life ==
D'Agosto was born in Omaha, Nebraska, the son of Deanna Rae (née Vellinga) and Alan D'Agosto, Omaha's major Arby's restaurant franchisee. His mother is from Sioux City, Iowa, while his father is from Omaha.

He has two older brothers, Andrew and Patrick, and two younger sisters, Julie and Katie.

D'Agosto was raised Roman Catholic and selected Genesius of Rome, the patron saint of actors, as his confirmation name. D'Agosto said that he wanted to be a priest when he was young, then when he was 10 years old he started getting into improv.

D'Agosto was very involved in drama and theatre growing up, acting in many different plays and musicals. He participated in competitive forensics speech tournaments during sixth, seventh, and eighth grades. He graduated from Creighton Preparatory School in 1998 and attended Marquette University, where he graduated cum laude in 2002 with a double major in history and theatre.

== Career ==
D'Agosto's big break came when he was cast as the ethical committee chairman Larry Fouch in the dark teenage comedy Election (1999), while he was still a senior at Creighton Prep. The film was written and directed by Alexander Payne, another alumnus of Creighton Prep. D'Agosto starred in the film Psycho Beach Party (2000) while still in college. In 2002, he moved to Los Angeles to pursue a full-time acting career.

He landed guest appearances on primetime television series such as Boston Public, ER, Six Feet Under, Cold Case, House, Supernatural, and Without a Trace. He appeared in three episodes of The Office. He also played West Rosen on the series Heroes.

To prepare for the film Fired Up!, D'Agosto spent three weeks at a cheer camp and worked with a professional choreographer. He also starred in From Prada to Nada with Camilla Belle, which is loosely based on Jane Austen's Sense and Sensibility. In 2011, he starred as Sam Lawton in Final Destination 5.

In Fall 2012, D'Agosto played the role of Tony Kirby in You Can't Take It with You at the Antaeus Theatre Company in Los Angeles.

As of 2013, D'Agosto co-starred in Showtime's Masters of Sex as obstetrician Dr. Ethan Haas, fictional protégé of pioneering sex researcher Dr. William H. Masters (of Masters and Johnson fame). His character is a composite of two of Masters' actual associates.

To prepare for the part of Dr. Haas, in addition to reading the biography that Masters of Sex is based on, D'Agosto read The Fifties by David Halberstam. He also watched movies from the 1950s and documentaries on journalist Edward R. Murrow, which had a lot of "individual footage of interviews with these sort of everyday people from that time period."

In late 2014, he appeared on Grey's Anatomy playing the OB/GYN surgical resident Graham Maddox. He left the show late November 2014 in the episode 'Risk'.

D'Agosto was cast in early October 2015 in the role of Harvey Dent in the television series Gotham.

In 2017, D'Agosto starred in the lead role in NBC's mockumentary legal comedy series, Trial & Error. Season 2 wrapped in August 2018.

In November 2022, D'Agosto has a recurring role as Deputy Director Doug Bailey in Criminal Minds: Evolution.

== Personal life ==
He married Andrea Bricco in 2015. They have one child, a son. He is currently pursuing a Masters in Divinity through Meadville Lombard.

== Filmography ==
=== Film ===
Year	Title	Role	Notes
1999	Election	Larry Fouch	Credited as Nick D'Agosto
2000	Psycho Beach Party	Counterman	Credited as Nick D'Agosto
2006	Inside	Alex	
2007	Rocket Science	Ben Wekselbaum	
2007	Drive-Thru	Fisher Kent	
2007	L.A. Blues	Adam Cooper	
2008	Extreme Movie	Evan	
2009	Fired Up!	Shawn Colfax	
2010	Dirty Girl	Joel	
2011	From Prada to Nada	Edward Ferris	
2011	Final Destination 5	Sam Lawton	
2011	New Romance	Nick	Short film
2011	Mardi Gras: Spring Break	Mike Morgan	
2018	The Last Days of TJ Staggs	Boss	Short film
2022	Rattled!	Elliott	
2024	Perfect Ten	Jeff	Short film

=== Television ===
Year	Title	Role	Notes
2002	Do Over	Todd York	Episode: "Valentine's Day Dance"
2003	ER	Andy	2 episodes
2003	Boston Public	Richard Kinney	Episode: "Chapter Seventy-Two"
2004	Cracking Up	Ben	Episode: "Pilot"
2004	Six Feet Under	Jonathan Gorodetsky	Episode: "Bomb Shelter"
2004	Cold Case	Chris (1979)	Episode: "Daniela"
2005	House	Keith Foster	Episode: "Detox"
2005	Supernatural	Gavin	Episode: "Asylum"
2006	Related	P.J.	2 episodes
2006	Without a Trace	Ted Soros	Episode: "Fade-Away"
2006	Big Day	Dr. Zaks	Episode: "Boobzilla"
2007	The Office	Hunter	3 episodes (1 uncredited)
2007	Heroes	West Rosen	Recurring role (season 2; 9 episodes)
2010	This Little Piggy	Eric	TV movie
2012	Breakout Kings	Travis Muncey	Episode: "Double Down"
2013	Don't Trust the B— in Apartment 23	Will	Episode: "The D..."
2013–14	Masters of Sex	Dr. Ethan Haas	Main role (season 1; 11 episodes), recurring role (season 2; 2 episodes)
2014	Review	Mark	4 episodes
2014–16	Gotham	Harvey Dent	Recurring role (season 1; 3 episodes), main role (season 2; 3 episodes)
2014	Grey's Anatomy	Graham Maddox	3 episodes
2014	Talking Marriage with Ryan Bailey	Himself	Episode: "Nicholas D'Agosto"
2015	Grace and Frankie	Dutch	Episode: "The Spelling Bee"
2017–2018	Trial & Error	Josh Segal	Main role
2021	The Good Doctor	Eric Porter - (Insurance Rep)	Episode: "Decrypt"
2022–2024	Criminal Minds: Evolution	Deputy Director Doug Bailey	Recurring role

=== Music videos ===
Year	Title	Artist	Notes
2011	New Romance	Miles Fisher	
