= Masters of Sex (book) =

2009 biography of Masters and Johnson

Masters of Sex: The Life and Times of William Masters and Virginia Johnson, the Couple Who Taught America How to Love
- Cover of the first edition
- Author: Thomas Maier
- Language: English
- Subject: Masters and Johnson
- Publisher: Basic Books
- Publication date: 2009
- Publication place: United States
- Media type: Print (Hardcover and Paperback)
- Pages: 440

Masters of Sex: The Life and Times of William Masters and Virginia Johnson, the Couple Who Taught America How to Love is a 2009 biography by Thomas Maier. The book chronicles the early lives and work of two American sexologists, Dr. William Masters and Virginia Johnson, who studied human sexuality from 1957 to the 1990s. The 2013 Showtime television series Masters of Sex, starring Michael Sheen and Lizzy Caplan, is based on the book.

== Reception ==
The book had a positive reception. Debby Applegate described the biography as "a terrific book about the unlikely couple who touched off the sexual revolution. More than a biography, this is an intimate history of sex in the twentieth century." The New York Times commended Maier's writing style and sense of humor. The Chicago Tribune named it as one of their favorite non-fiction books of 2009.
