= Thomas Maier =

American author and journalist

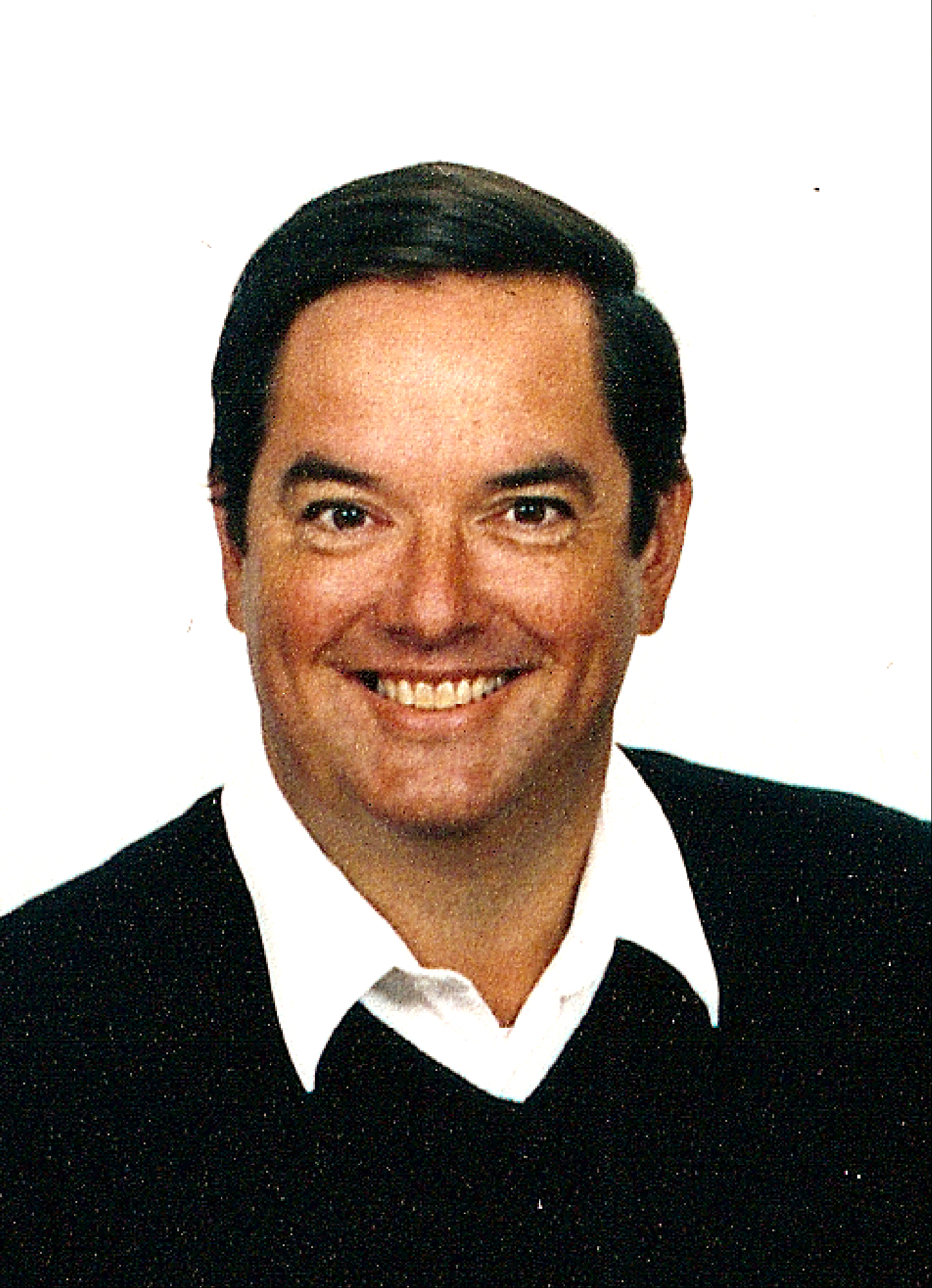
- Education: Fordham University, Columbia University Graduate School of Journalism
- Occupations: Author, journalist, television producer
- Employer(s): Chicago Sun-Times, Newsday
- Known for: Writing, investigative journalism
- Notable work: Masters of Sex; When Lions Roar

Thomas Maier is an American author, journalist, and television producer. His book Masters of Sex: The Life and Times of William Masters and Virginia Johnson, the Couple Who Taught America How to Love is the basis for the Primetime Emmy-winning Showtime drama Masters of Sex.

External audio
- Pioneering 'Masters Of Sex' Brought Science To The Bedroom, 32:38, Fresh Air

Maier is also the author and a producer of "Mafia Spies", a six-part Paramount+ docuseries, based on his book of the same name. In 2022, he won the Columbia Journalism School Alumni Award for career achievement.

Maier is the author of When Lions Roar: The Churchills and the Kennedys, a history of the two families. His other books include The Kennedys: America's Emerald Kings, a multi-generational history of the Kennedy family and the impact of their Irish-Catholic background on their lives, and Dr. Spock: An American Life. The latter was named a "Notable Book of the Year" in 1998 by The New York Times and the subject of a BBC and A&E biography documentary.

His 1994 book, Newhouse: All the Glitter, Power and Glory of America's Richest Media Empire and the Secretive Man Behind It, won the Frank Luther Mott Award by the National Honor Society in journalism and mass communication for best media book of the year.

Maier joined Newsday in 1984 after working at the Chicago Sun-Times. He has won several awards in the field of journalism, including the national Society of Professional Journalists' top reporting prize on two occasions, the National Headliner Award, the Worth Bingham Prize, and the New York Deadline Club award. In 2002, he won the International Consortium of Investigative Journalists' top prize for a series about immigrant workplace deaths. He won the John M. Patterson Prize from the Columbia University Graduate School of Journalism for television documentary production and later received the John McCloy Journalism Fellowship to Europe. He lives on Long Island, New York.

== Bibliography ==
- Newhouse: All the Glitter, Power and Glory of America's Richest Media Empire and the Secretive Man Behind It (1994)
- Dr. Spock: An American Life (1998)
- The Kennedys: America's Emerald Kings (2003)
- Masters of Sex: The Life and Times of William Masters and Virginia Johnson, the Couple Who Taught America How to Love (2009)
- When Lions Roar: The Churchills and the Kennedys (2014)
- Mafia Spies: The Inside Story of the CIA, Gangsters, JFK, and Castro (2019), Skyhorse Publishing, ISBN 978-1-5107-4171-3
- "All That Glitters: Anna Winter, Tina Brown and The Rivalry Inside America's Richest Media Empire" (2019)

== Awards ==
- 1986: National Sigma Delta Chi Award, Society of Professional Journalists, "The Confession-Takers" series.
- 1987: Worth Bingham Award, "Rush To Burn", Newsday.
- 1987: Page One Award for Crusading Journalism, "Rush to Burn", Newsday.
- 1987: New York State Associated Press Award for In-Depth Reporting, "Rush to Burn", Newsday.
- 1994: Frank Luther Mott-Kappa Tau Alpha Research Award for Newhouse: All the Glitter, Power and Glory of America's Richest Media Empire and the Secretive Man Behind It.
- 1998: New York Times Notable Book of The Year, Author Dr. Spock: An American Life.
- 2002: ICIJ, now known as Daniel Pearl Awards for Outstanding International Investigative Reporting, Death on the Job: Immigrants at Risk.
- 2010: National Headliners Award, Fallout: The Legacy of Brookhaven Lab in the Pacific.
- 2010: New York Emmy Finalist, Documentary, "Fallout," Newsday.
- 2012: Sigma Delta Chi Award, The Society of Professional Journalist, Online Investigative Reporting.
- 2012: Society of American Business Editors and Writers Best in Business.
- 2012: Investigative Reporters and Editors (IRE), Finalist with NPR.
- 2012, Karpoor Chandra Kulish (KCK) International Award for Excellence in Print Journalism, Winner.
- 2013, Critics Choice Television Award, "Most Exciting New Series,"Author/Producer Masters of Sex.
- 2014, Golden Globes, Best Drama Nominee, Author/Producer Masters of Sex.
- 2014, American Film Institute (AFI), TV Program of The Year, Author/Producer Masters of Sex.
- 2014: New York Press Club, Television, The Body Business, News 12 Long Island/Newsday.
- 2015, The Silurians Press Club, Merit Certificate, "Cash Crop: Marijuana on Long Island and Across the United States," Newsday/News 12.
- 2016, USC Scripter Award, Nominated, Author/Producer Masters of Sex.
- 2018, Silurians Press Club, Merit Certificate, Reporting on Minority Issues, "Unequal Justice", Newsday.
- 2020, New York Press Club Award, Documentary, "An Innocent Man?" Newsday.
- 2020, New York Emmy Finalist, "An Innocent Man?" Newsday.
- 2021, New York Emmy Award, "Proving Innocence: The Story of Keith Bush", Newsday.
- 2022, New York Press Club Award, Feature-Science Medicine & Technology NY Metro

Newspaper, “The Gift, Interrupted”, Newsday.

- 2022, Columbia Journalism School Alumni Award,
- 2023, Silurians Press Club, Merit Certificate, Arts and Culture Reporting, "The Godfather: 50 Years Later", Newsday.
