= Heléne Yorke =

Canadian actress

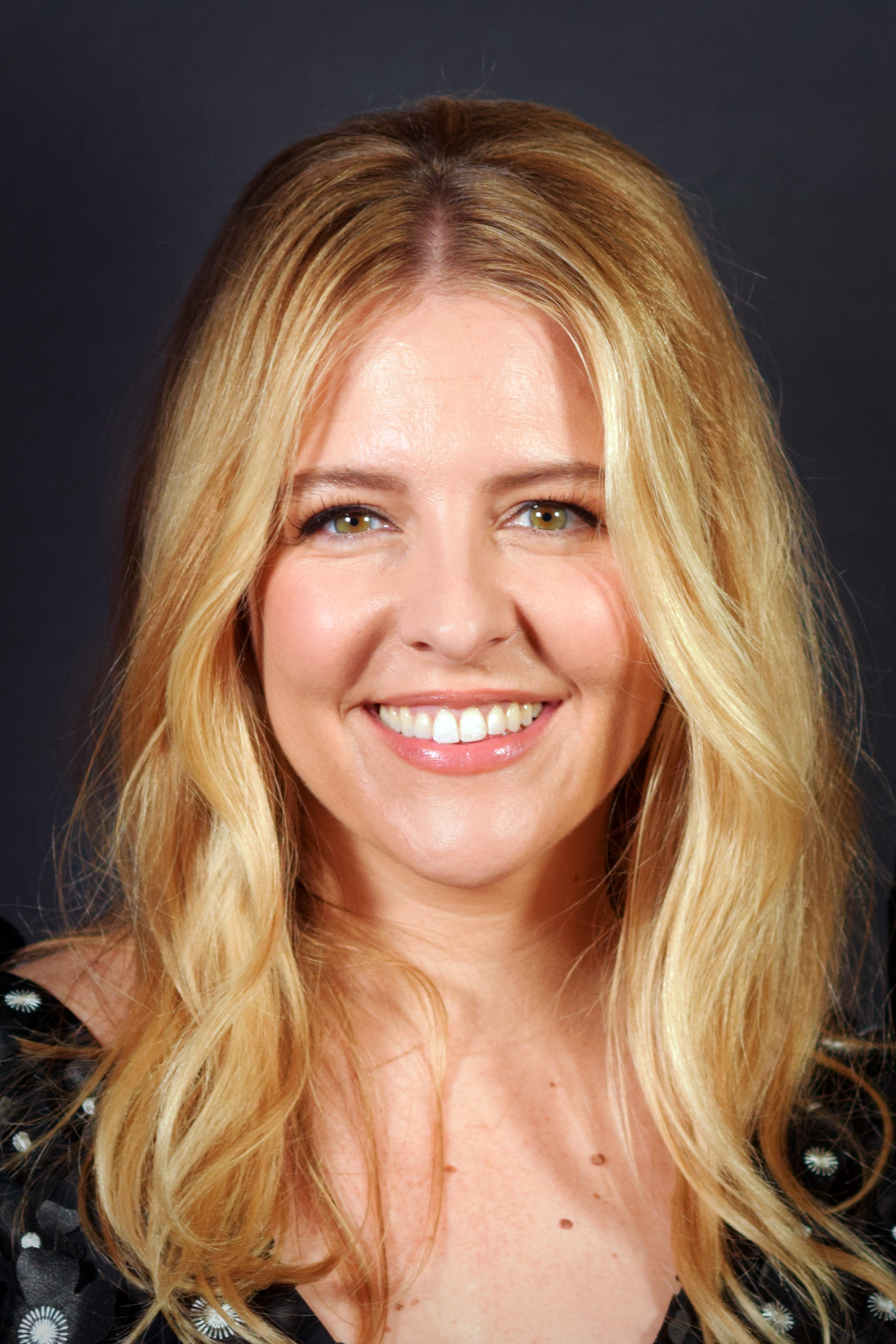
- Yorke in 2023
- Born: 1984 or 1985 (age 40–41)
- Occupation: Actress
- Years active: 2007–present
- Spouse: Bary Dunn (m. 2021)
- Children: 2

Heléne Yorke is a Canadian actress. From 2019 to 2023, she starred as Brooke Dubek on the Comedy Central/HBO Max television series The Other Two. She has also played the roles of Jane Martin on the Showtime American period drama television series Masters of Sex, Olivia Graves on Graves and Amy Breslin on The Good Fight. Her work on Broadway includes originating the roles of Olive Neal in Bullets Over Broadway and Evelyn Williams in American Psycho, as well as G(a)linda in the second National Tour of Wicked.

== Career ==
Yorke has worked on various Broadway productions, including Bullets Over Broadway, American Psycho, and Grease. She also played Glinda in Wicked on tour.

In 2013, Yorke was cast in a recurring role as Jane Martin on the Showtime period drama television series, Masters of Sex. From 2016 to 2017, she played the major role of Olivia Graves, the daughter of Nick Nolte's character, on the Epix television series Graves.

In 2019 she began starring as Brooke Dubek on the Comedy Central/HBO Max television series The Other Two, which ran for three seasons before concluding in June 2023.

== Personal life ==
Yorke dated chef Bobby Flay from 2016 to 2019. Throughout their relationship she ran a food-based Instagram account chronicling her cooking adventures with Flay, but the account was deleted following their breakup.

Yorke married Bary Dunn in a Jewish ceremony on September 3, 2021, in Brooklyn, New York. In January 2022, she announced her pregnancy, and in June 2022, the couple had a son. In February 2024, Yorke announced her second pregnancy, expected in June 2024.

== Notable works ==
=== Theater ===
Year(s)	Production	Role	Location	Category
2007	Walmartopia	Hooters Girl / Daphne	Minetta Lane Theatre	Off-Broadway
2008	What's That Smell: The Music of Jacob Sterling	Ensemble	Atlantic Theater Company	Off-Broadway
2008	High School Musical	Sharpay Evans (replacement)	N/A	United States Tour
2008–2009	Grease	Marty Maraschino (replacement)	Brooks Atkinson Theatre	Broadway
2009–2010	Wicked	Glinda	Various	Second National Tour
2014	Bullets Over Broadway	Olive Neal	St. James Theatre	Broadway
2016	American Psycho	Evelyn Williams	Gerald Schoenfeld Theatre	Broadway
2016	Kiss Me, Kate	Lois Lane/Bianca	Studio 54	Benefit Concert Reading
2018	Grand Hotel	Flaemmchen	City Center	Encores! Revival
2024	Strategic Love Play	Woman	Minetta Lane Theater	Off-Broadway

=== Film ===
Year	Title	Role	Notes
2012	All Wifed Out	Steph	
2014	Are You Joking?	Mona Burack	
2015	The Night Before	Cindy	
2026	Carousel	TBA	
2026	Hershey †	Margaret	Post-production

=== Television ===
Year	Title	Role	Notes
2010	Louie	Hot Girl	Episode: "Night Out"
2012	A Gifted Man	Ella Halloran	Episode: "In Case of Blind Spots"
2012	30 Rock	Jessica	Episode: "Standards and Practices"
2012	I Just Want My Pants Back	Kate	Episode: "Quid No Quo"
2013	High Maintenance	Lainey	Web series; episode: "Olivia"
2013–2015	Masters of Sex	Jane Martin	Recurring role (seasons 1–3) 16 episodes
2014	Robot Chicken	Jem / Cheetara / Marilyn Monroe	Voice role; episode: "Up, Up, and Buffet"
2014	American Dad!	Mary Smith	Voice role; 2 episodes
2014–2017	Family Guy	various	Recurring voice roles; 6 episodes
2015	Person of Interest	Lauren Buchanan	Episode: "Q & A"
2016	Quantico	Leigh Davis	4 episodes
2016–2020	High Maintenance	Lainey	2 episodes
2016–2017	Graves	Olivia Graves	Main role
2017–2018	The Good Fight	Amy Breslin	Recurring role (seasons 1–2), 7 episodes
2019–2023	The Other Two	Brooke Dubek	Lead role
2019	Elementary	Holly Meers	Episode: "Red Light, Green Light"
2020	Future Man	Randall	2 episodes
2020	Katy Keene	Amanda	Recurring role
2021	Ziwe	Leah	Episode: "Whitewashing"
