= Masters of Sex =

American period drama television series

- Genre: Period drama
- Based on: Masters of Sex by Thomas Maier
- Developed by: Michelle Ashford
- Starring: Michael Sheen; Lizzy Caplan; Caitlin FitzGerald; Teddy Sears; Nicholas D'Agosto; Annaleigh Ashford
- Composer: Michael Penn
- Country of origin: United States
- Original language: English
- No. of seasons: 4
- No. of episodes: 46 (list of episodes)

Production
- Executive producers: Michelle Ashford; Sarah Timberman; Carl Beverly; Amy Lippman; Judith Verno
- Producers: Michael Sheen; Lizzy Caplan; Thomas Maier
- Production locations: New York City; Los Angeles
- Cinematography: Ben Davis; Michael Weaver
- Running time: 55–60 minutes
- Production companies: Round Two Productions; Timberman/Beverly Productions; Sony Pictures Television; Showtime Networks

Original release
- Network: Showtime
- Release: September 29, 2013 – November 13, 2016

Masters of Sex is an American period drama television series that premiered on September 29, 2013, on Showtime. It was developed by Michelle Ashford and loosely based on Thomas Maier's biography Masters of Sex. Set in the 1950s through the late 1960s, the series tells the story of Masters and Johnson (Dr. William Masters and Virginia Johnson) who are portrayed by Michael Sheen and Lizzy Caplan, respectively. The series has received critical acclaim. It was nominated for a Golden Globe Award for Best Drama Series in 2013. The series was canceled by Showtime on November 30, 2016, after four seasons.

== Premise ==
The series explores the research and the relationship between William Masters (Michael Sheen) and Virginia Johnson (Lizzy Caplan), two pioneering researchers of human sexuality at Washington University in St. Louis, Missouri. The series begins in October 1956 and ends in August 1969 with the fourth season.

== Plot ==
Season	Episodes	Originally released	
Season	Episodes	First released	Last released
1	12	September 29, 2013	December 15, 2013
2	12	July 13, 2014	September 28, 2014
3	12	July 12, 2015	September 27, 2015
4	10	September 11, 2016	November 13, 2016

William Masters (Michael Sheen) is a renowned fertility specialist at Washington University in St. Louis. In 1956, he prepares to initiate a study on human sexuality but predicts opposition from the university's provost Barton Scully (Beau Bridges). He hires Virginia Johnson (Lizzy Caplan), a former nightclub singer, to be his new secretary and help organize his new research program. He quickly discovers that she is extremely intelligent and personable, putting all participants at ease. They begin by observing the physiology of the human body during sexual intercourse and masturbation. Although the study is conducted in secrecy, Scully is informed of its existence and shuts it down. Masters briefly relocates the study to a brothel but it eventually returns to Washington University after Masters discovers Scully's homosexuality and blackmails him. Meanwhile, Masters' wife Libby (Caitlin FitzGerald) wants a baby. Masters, who doesn't want a child, lies to her that she is infertile when in actuality his sperm count is low. Libby discovers her husband's lies and proceeds to be artificially inseminated; she subsequently gives birth to their child Johnny.

After Masters promotes Johnson to be his research associate, the two make themselves the subjects of their own study by having sex with each other and charting their physiology. Both are of the belief that this is only for the work, although the ethics of this begins to pain Masters. He demeans Johnson by offering to pay her for her contributions to "his" study. Johnson is insulted and quits. Masters prepares to present their findings to Washington University. The presentation is a disaster and Masters is fired. Devastated, he tells Johnson he needs her and the two have sex for the first time without wires. They begin meeting regularly at a hotel on the Illinois-Missouri border to continue their affair. Masters takes on several positions at other hospitals but his study continues to face scrutiny. He and Johnson finally open a clinic to continue the work without opposition. Meanwhile, Masters is left impotent for a year after discovering that Johnson has been seeing other men, and they stop seeing each other in secret outside of work. After their reconciliation, together they use this as an opportunity to develop a treatment for sexual dysfunction. After developing a successful technique, Masters and Johnson move on to treating couples and are interviewed by CBS for their work. During this time, Libby becomes aware of her husband's affair. Feeling lost, and incentivized to start focusing on herself, Libby begins her own affair with a black man she's been volunteering with at the Congress of Racial Equality.

In 1965, Masters and Johnson publish their findings in a book called Human Sexual Response. While the public reception is mixed, it increases their recognition and they begin taking on high-profile clients hoping to remedy their sex life. The duo take on an investor to help fund their practice, perfume magnate Dan Logan (Josh Charles). Logan begins courting Johnson romantically as she begins losing interest in her continued affair with Masters. Meanwhile, Masters develops a training program for sexual surrogates for single men and women displaying sexual dysfunctions. The controversial program, dangerously close to prostitution, is objected to by Johnson. Masters uses Johnson's brief absence to launch the program, which incenses Johnson. With Logan's work at the clinic nearing its end, he and Johnson seem to develop true feelings for each other; this devastates Masters. In his desperate fervor to repair his relationship with Johnson, Masters organizes a disastrous dinner with Johnson, Logan, and Logan's wife Alice (Judy Greer). Upon returning to the clinic, both Masters and Johnson are arrested after one of their surrogates comes forward with trumped-up prostitution charges. Libby sees this as an opportunity to protect her family and leaves Masters. After Logan proposes to Johnson, Masters admits his love for her but Johnson instead chooses to go to Las Vegas where she'll be married to Logan. Despite chasing her to the airport, Masters ultimately lets her go.

In the aftermath of Johnson's rejection of his love, Masters is left at a low point. After being forced to attend AA meetings, he attempts to mend his relationship with Libby. Johnson, on the other hand, is spiraling after leaving Logan in Las Vegas under unclear circumstances. With the Masters and Johnson partnership appearing dead, potential investor Hugh Hefner insists they repair their brand. Both Masters and Johnson return to the clinic, but with Masters working with Dr. Nancy Leveau (Betty Gilpin) and Johnson with psychologist Art Dreesen (Jeremy Strong). After an intimate discussion with Dreesen, Johnson realizes she loves Masters. However, he is no longer receptive to her advances. The prostitution charges against the clinic disappear after Masters takes a plea deal to protect Johnson; despite this, he remains steadfast in his rejections of Johnson's advances. Meanwhile, the Masters and Johnson institute begins inspiring copycats spreading false information. They pose as a couple to investigate a clinic in Topeka; during their charade, Johnson tells Masters she loves him. Masters finally reciprocates and the two are engaged shortly after. The series ends with Masters and Johnson getting married and about to set forth on their widely-controversial conversion therapy studies.

== Cast and characters ==
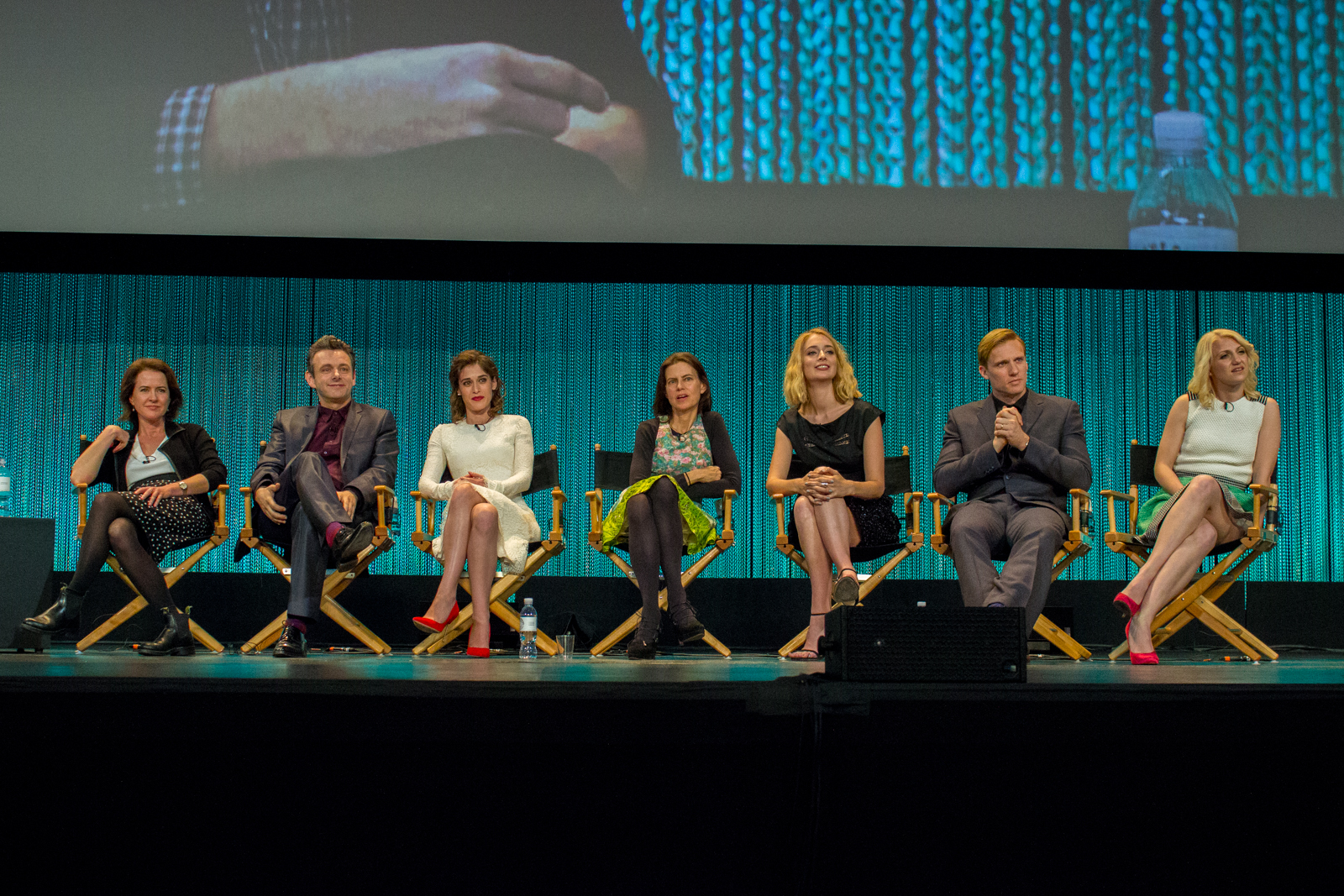
The cast and crew at PaleyFest 2014. From left: Michelle Ashford, Michael Sheen, Lizzy Caplan, Sarah Timberman (executive producer), Caitlin FitzGerald, Teddy Sears and Annaleigh Ashford

=== Main ===
- Michael Sheen as William Masters
- Lizzy Caplan as Virginia E. Johnson
- Caitlin FitzGerald as Libby Masters
- Teddy Sears as Dr. Austin Langham (seasons 1–2, recurring seasons 3–4)
- Nicholas D'Agosto as Dr. Ethan Haas (season 1, guest season 2)
- Annaleigh Ashford as Betty DiMello (seasons 2–4, recurring season 1)

=== Recurring ===
- Beau Bridges as Barton Scully, medical school provost and longtime friend of William Masters (seasons 1–4)
- Allison Janney as Margaret Scully, Barton's wife (seasons 1–3)
- Rose McIver as Vivian Scully, Barton and Margaret's daughter (seasons 1–2)
- Heléne Yorke as Jane Martin, a hospital secretary and participant in the sex study (seasons 1–3)
- Kevin Christy as Lester Linden, the archivist of Masters and Johnson's work (seasons 1–4)
- Julianne Nicholson as Dr. Lillian DePaul, a doctor working in the Obstetrics Department of Washington University Hospital (seasons 1–2)
- Ann Dowd as Estabrooks 'Essie' Masters, William's mother (seasons 1–2)
- Mather Zickel as George Johnson, Virginia's ex-husband and father of her children (seasons 1–3)
- Cole Sand (seasons 1–2) and Noah Robbins (season 3) as Henry Johnson, Virginia's son
- Kayla Madison (seasons 1–2) and Isabelle Fuhrman (seasons 3–4) as Tessa Johnson, Virginia's daughter
- Greg Grunberg as Gene Moretti, Betty's husband (seasons 1–2)
- Finn Wittrock as Dale, a male prostitute whom Barton Scully patronizes (season 1)
- Garrett M. Brown as Chancellor Doug Fitzhugh, the head of a Washington University (seasons 1, 3)
- Brian Howe as Sam Duncan, chief of police (seasons 1–3)
- Elizabeth Bogush as Elise Langham, Austin's wife (seasons 1–2)
- Betsy Brandt as Barbara Sanderson, Masters' new secretary, and later a patient of his clinic (season 2)
- Artemis Pebdani as Flo Packer, the owner of a diet pill company (season 2)
- Keke Palmer as Coral, the Masters' African-American nanny (season 2)
- Jocko Sims as Robert Franklin, Coral's brother and a civil rights activist (season 2)
- Sarah Silverman as Helen Schiff, Betty's lover (seasons 2–4)
- Christian Borle as Francis 'Frank' Masters Jr., the younger brother of William Masters (season 2)
- Marin Ireland as Pauline Masters, Frank's wife (season 2)
- Danny Huston as Dr. Douglas Greathouse, the head of a hospital's Obstetrics Department (season 2)
- Courtney B. Vance as Dr. Charles Hendricks, the head of an African-American St. Louis hospital who seeks integration (season 2)
- Adam Arkin as Shep Tally, a PR expert hired by Masters and Johnson to help them present their work (season 2)
- Jack Laufer as Herb Spleeb, a lawyer (seasons 2–4)
- Josh Charles as Dan Logan (season 3)
- Jaeden Martell as Johnny Masters, Bill and Libby's son (seasons 3–4)
- Alyvia Alyn Lind as Jenny Masters, Bill and Libby's daughter (seasons 3–4)
- Ben Koldyke as Paul Edley, Master's neighbour (season 3)
- Susan May Pratt as Joy Edley, Master's neighbour (season 3)
- Colin Woodell as Ronald Sturgis (season 3)
- Emily Kinney as Nora Everett, a woman fascinated with Bill and Virginia's work who later becomes part of Bill's surrogacy program (season 3)
- Michael O'Keefe as Harry Eshelman, Virginia's father (seasons 3–4)
- Frances Fisher as Edna Eshelman, Virginia's mother (seasons 3–4)
- John G. Connolly as Hugh Hefner, editor-in-chief of Playboy (seasons 3–4)
- Danny Jacobs as Bob Drag, a publisher (seasons 3–4)
- Jeremy Strong as Dr. Art Dreesen, a psychologist who is brought in to help lessen Bill and Virginia's workload (season 4)
- Betty Gilpin as Dr. Nancy Leveau, Art's wife and a doctor who is brought in to help lessen Bill and Virginia's workload (season 4)
- Niecy Nash as Louise Bell, the head of Alcoholics Anonymous (season 4)
- David Walton as Bram Keller, Bill's lawyer (season 4)
- Nick Clifford as Guy (season 4)
- Kelli O'Hara as Dody Oliver, Bill's first love who did not answer his marriage proposal (season 4)

== Development and production ==
Showtime ordered the pilot for Masters of Sex in August 2011, and greenlit it for series in June 2012, with the first season consisting of twelve episodes. Paul Bettany was originally cast as William Masters and had a say in the casting of the female lead which had reportedly stalled the process. After his exit, Michael Sheen replaced him and Lizzy Caplan was cast as Virginia Johnson.

Writer/producer Michelle Ashford serves as showrunner for Masters of Sex. She assembled a majority-female writing staff, although she says this was unintentional.

Ashford created the character of Barton Scully out of a combination of several men whom Masters knew. One of them was gay, but was not the man serving as provost during Masters' initial study.

Prop master Jeffrey Johnson noted the difficulty of obtaining accurate information about sexual devices from the time period. "They were so taboo it was hard to find research drawings. People didn't even put them in writing." He obtained some vintage vibrators and dildos for use in the series along with acquiring condoms manufactured in the era (which did not have the reservoir tips of modern condoms). He designed "Ulysses", a transparent dildo with attached camera first seen in the pilot episode, from scratch, along with a diaphragm sizing kit seen in later episodes.

Annaleigh Ashford, who has a recurring role in the first season as Betty Dimello, was promoted to series regular in season two.

The opening credits sequence was created by design studio Elastic. The sequence, which includes suggestive, tongue-in-cheek sex metaphors and symbols, received a mixed response from critics; it placed on both best and worst lists for opening credit sequences. It was also nominated for the Primetime Emmy Award for Outstanding Main Title Design.

== Historical accuracy ==
As noted by the Los Angeles Times television critic, the series "hangs on bones of fact"; "it's more useful for the viewer to think of it as all made up. Because, mostly, it is, and because to the extent it tells the story of two real people, it also adorns the telling with dramatic practicalities, invented characters and narrative detours. Indeed, it's down these side streets, casting a brief light on a passing character (patients, prostitutes, a provost's wife), that the show finds many of its best moments."

Other than principal characters, which are partly fictional, adults are significantly fictional and children are entirely fictional. In real life, Masters and Johnson each have two children, but in the series, they have three children each. Episodes featuring the children include a disclaimer stating that their story lines are "entirely fictitious". Series creator Michelle Ashford explained, "We are telling a non-fiction story and one where there are people who are still alive out there, and those people need to be protected. We were advised to add [the baby] to protect the people that are still alive. It wasn't a storytelling prerogative. It had to do with protecting living people".

Robert C. Kolodny, who worked alongside Masters and Johnson for decades, commented on the series "It would be a shame for young students in the field to believe that the Showtime series has any factual basis whatsoever other than managing to get [Masters and Johnson] at the right medical school in the right city."

== International broadcast ==
In Canada, the series debuted on September 29, 2013, on The Movie Network. In Australia, the series premiered on SBS One on October 3, 2013. In Ireland, the series premiered on October 4, 2013, on RTÉ Two. In the UK, it debuted on Channel 4 on October 8, 2013. In New Zealand, it debuted on SoHo on October 23, 2013. Virgin Media acquired the UK rights for Masters of Sex and it started airing on September 21, 2018. In the UK, the series was available on STV Player until February 2023.

== Reception ==
=== Critical response ===
Critical response of Masters of Sex
Season	Rotten Tomatoes	Metacritic
1	90% (59 reviews)	86 (32 reviews)
2	98% (44 reviews)	89 (17 reviews)
3	69% (32 reviews)	72 (15 reviews)
4	80% (10 reviews)	70 (5 reviews)

The first season of Masters of Sex received critical acclaim. Based on 59 reviews collected by Rotten Tomatoes, the first season received a 90% approval rating from critics, with a rating average of 8.3 out of 10. The site's consensus states: "Seductive and nuanced, Masters of Sex features smart performances, deft direction, and impeccable period decor." Metacritic gave the first season a score of 86 out of 100, based on 32 reviews. The American Film Institute listed it as one of the top ten television series of 2013.

Matt Roush of TV Guide wrote that "There is no more fascinating, or entertaining, new series this fall season." Diane Werts of Newsday gave it an "A" grade, complimenting the series on its use of humor, stating "its deft balance of epic scope and whimsical humanity", as well as the strong performances of the actors and creator Michelle Ashford's "scene-setting scripts". David Wiegand of the San Francisco Chronicle particularly praised the performances, calling them "extraordinary" and "stunning", and noting the series' A-list directors, among them Michael Apted and John Madden. Hank Stuever of The Washington Post wrote that after the first two episodes, "the characters get better and more complex, the story builds, strange things start to happen and now I can't wait to see how its interweaving plots unfold." Alan Sepinwall of HitFix praised lead actors Michael Sheen and Lizzy Caplan, calling them "terrific", and saying that "Masters of Sex is the best new show of the fall by a very long stretch. It's also a refreshing anomaly: a prestige cable drama that doesn't feel like a recombination of elements from 15 shows that came before it." According to Robert Lloyd, the Los Angeles Times television critic, the show is a "handsome thing, another well-dressed romp through the American mid-century, when things (we imagine) were simpler and (so we like to think) less sophisticated, but also more exciting. And it's true that sexual naiveté of that age can seem incredible in a day when pornography is just another thing on your platform of choice. But even in an age when Masters of Sex is a TV show, the subject remains stubbornly powerful, private and confounding. We have come far, and we are still cavemen."

The second season also received critical acclaim equal to if not greater than the first season. It received a score of 89 out of 100 on Metacritic based on 17 reviews, indicating "universal acclaim". On Rotten Tomatoes, it has a 98% approval rating among critics based on 44 reviews, with a rating average of 8.5 out of 10. The consensus reads: "Boasting an expanded storyline and broader focus, Masters of Sex's second season improves on its already outstanding predecessor."

The third season received generally positive reviews from critics, although received more mixed reviews than the previous seasons. It has a Metacritic score of 72 out of 100 based on 15 reviews. On Rotten Tomatoes, it has a 69% approval rating among critics based on 32 reviews, with a rating average of 7.6 out of 10. The consensus reads, "With a six-year leap forward in the timeline, Masters of Sex takes an intriguing dramatic turn, but may leave a few viewers feeling frustrated."

The fourth season received generally positive reviews from critics. It has a Metacritic score of 70 out of 100 based on 5 reviews. On Rotten Tomatoes, it has an 80% approval rating among critics based on 10 reviews, with a rating average of 7.6 out of 10. The consensus reads, "Masters of Sex closes the book with a stylish final season that doesn't aim to scale the heights of the series' artistic peak, but satisfies with its thoughtful investigation of its two protagonists' diverging paths."

=== Controversy ===
The third season episode "Monkey Business" drew substantial controversy for a fictitious storyline wherein Masters and Johnson attempt to cure the sexual dysfunction of a gorilla. Reviewers were especially critical of a scene where Johnson flashes the gorilla her breasts. The episode was panned by critics. The A.V. Club said of the episode, "Once in a while, Masters of Sex turns out a script that not even its actors can save, and 'Monkey Business' is one of those episodes." Indiewire defended the premise as "an opportunity to explore just how close we are to our evolutionary forebears," but called the execution "baffling". The episode was described by The Hollywood Reporter as "infamous", and by The New York Times as the show's "shark-jump" moment.

In an interview conducted during the airing of the third season, Michael Sheen criticized the storyline: "We were all very concerned about it, but other people were very confident that it was going to work and that it would be great. At a certain point, you just have to trust, and that doesn’t necessarily mean that it’s going to work out." In 2022, Lizzy Caplan reflected on the controversial scene, filmed on her birthday in 2015, as something she fought against doing: "When I tell you the amount of times we tried to push back on this storyline to no avail... Working on that show was one of the most collaborative experiences, which was probably why this felt extra strange. There were things that pushed my level of comfort, but certainly, it was all my own choice and I was aiming to push it. I was never pushed by any producers to do anything I didn’t want to do — up until this point."

=== Awards and nominations ===
In June 2013, the series was honored, along with five others, with the Critics' Choice Television Award for Most Exciting New Series. The series received two nominations for the 2014 Writers Guild of America Awards, for Best New Series and Best Episodic Drama for "Pilot". For the 71st Golden Globe Awards, the series was nominated for Best Drama Series, and Michael Sheen was nominated Best Drama Actor. For the 66th Primetime Emmy Awards, Lizzy Caplan received a nomination for Outstanding Lead Actress in a Drama Series, Beau Bridges received a nomination for Outstanding Guest Actor in a Drama Series, and Allison Janney won for Outstanding Guest Actress in a Drama Series.
