= Michelle Ashford =

American screenwriter and film producer

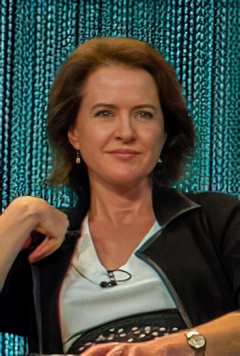
- Ashford at PaleyFest 2014
- Born: 1960 (age 65–66)
- Occupations: Screenwriter, film producer
- Spouse: Greg Walker

Michelle Ashford (born 1960) is an American screenwriter and film producer. She is best known for her Emmy-nominated writing for the 2010 Miniseries The Pacific. In 2013, Ashford's TV series Masters of Sex debuted in the US on Showtime.

== Filmography as a writer ==
- Cat Person - 2023
- Operation Mincemeat - 2022
- Masters of Sex – 2013–16
- The Pacific – 2010
- John Adams – 2008
- Suburban Shootout – 2008
- Medical Investigation – 2004
- Boomtown – 2002–03
- ATF – 1999
- L.A. Doctors – 1998
- New York News – 1995

== Filmography as a producer ==
- Mayfair Witches – 2023–
- Masters of Sex – 2013–16
- The Pacific – 2010
- Suburban Shootout – 2008
- Medical Investigation – 2004
- Boomtown – 2002–2003
- ATF – 1999
- L.A. Doctors – 1998
- Michael Hayes – 1997
- New York News – 1995

== Personal life ==
Ashford is married to television writer and producer Greg Walker, whom she met while he was working for her. The couple have two children together.
