= Virginia E. Johnson =

American sexologist and writer (1925–2013)

- Born: Mary Virginia Eshelman; February 11, 1925; Springfield, Missouri, U.S.
- Died: July 24, 2013 (aged 88); St. Louis, Missouri, U.S.
- Other name: Virginia Gibson
- Education: Drury College; University of Missouri; Kansas City Conservatory of Music; Washington University in St. Louis
- Occupation: Sexologist
- Known for: Masters and Johnson human sexuality research team
- Spouse(s): Two brief early marriages, followed by George Johnson (m. 1950; div. 1956) William Masters (m. 1971; div. 1993)
- Children: 2

Virginia E. Johnson (born Mary Virginia Eshelman; February 11, 1925 – July 24, 2013) was an American sexologist and a member of the Masters and Johnson sexuality research team. Along with her collaborator, William H. Masters, she pioneered research into the nature of human sexual response and the diagnosis and treatment of sexual dysfunctions and disorders from 1957 until the 1990s.

== Early life ==
Virginia Johnson was born Mary Virginia Eshelman in Springfield, Missouri, the daughter of Edna (née Evans) and Hershel "Harry" Eshelman, a farmer. Her paternal grandparents were members of the LDS Church, and her father had Hessian ancestry. When she was five, her family moved to Palo Alto, California, where her father worked as a groundskeeper for a hospital. The family later returned to Missouri and farming. Virginia enrolled at her hometown's Drury College at age 16, but dropped out and spent four years working in the Missouri state insurance office. She eventually returned to school, studying at the University of Missouri and the Kansas City Conservatory of Music, and during World War II began a music career as a band singer. She sang country music for radio station KWTO in Springfield, where she adopted the stage name Virginia Gibson.

Johnson moved to St. Louis, Missouri, where she became a business writer for the St. Louis Daily Record. Eschewing a singing career, Johnson enrolled at Washington University in St. Louis, intending to earn a degree in sociology but never attaining one.

== Sexological works ==
Johnson met William H. Masters in 1957 when he hired her as a research assistant at the Department of Obstetrics and Gynecology at Washington University in St. Louis. Masters trained her in medical terminology, therapy, and research during the years she worked as his assistant. Together they developed polygraph-like instruments that were designed to measure sexual arousal in humans. Using these tools, Masters and Johnson observed and measured about 700 men and women who agreed to engage in sexual activity with other participants or masturbate in Masters' laboratory. By observing these subjects, Johnson helped Masters identify the four stages of sexual response. This came to be known as the human sexual response cycle. The cycle consists of the excitement phase, plateau phase, orgasmic phase, and resolution phase. In 1964, Masters and Johnson established their own independent nonprofit research institution in St. Louis called the Reproductive Biology Research Foundation. The center was renamed the Masters and Johnson Institute in 1978. At the institute, Johnson stepped into an administrative role.

In April 2009, Thomas Maier reported in Scientific American that Johnson had serious reservations about the Masters and Johnson Institute's program to convert homosexuals into heterosexuals, a program which ran from 1968 to 1977.

== Personal life ==
By her early 20s, Johnson had married a Missouri politician; the marriage lasted two days. She then married a much older attorney, whom she also divorced. In 1950, Johnson married bandleader George Johnson, with whom she had a boy and a girl, before divorcing in 1956. In 1971, Johnson married William Masters after he divorced his first wife. They were divorced in 1993, though they continued to collaborate professionally. Johnson died in July 2013 "of complications from several illnesses".

== In popular culture ==
The American cable network Showtime debuted Masters of Sex, a dramatic television series loosely based on the 2009 biography of the same name, on September 29, 2013. The series stars Lizzy Caplan as Johnson.
