= William Masters =

American gynecologist (1915–2001)

- Born: William Howell Masters; December 27, 1915; Cleveland, Ohio, U.S.
- Died: February 16, 2001 (aged 85); Tucson, Arizona, U.S.
- Education: Lawrenceville School; Hamilton College; University of Rochester Medical Center
- Spouses: Elizabeth Ellis (m. 1942; div. 1971) Virginia E. Johnson (m. 1971; div. 1993) Geraldine B. Oliver (m. 1993)
- Children: 2

William Howell Masters (December 27, 1915 – February 16, 2001) was an American gynecologist and the senior member of the Masters and Johnson human sexuality research team. Along with his partner Virginia E. Johnson, he pioneered research into the nature of human sexual response and the diagnosis and treatment of sexual dysfunctions and disorders from 1957 until the 1990s.

== Early life ==
Born in Cleveland, Ohio, William Masters was the older son of Francis Wynn Masters and Estabrooks Taylor Masters. His younger brother was named Frank. Growing up, Masters had a particularly rough childhood at the hands of his father, a difficult man who liked to be in control and had a very bad temper. All household decisions had to be cleared through the father, and in fits of anger he beat young Bill with a belt, sometimes until Bill bled. Nevertheless, Bill was a bright child and excelled at school. After his Aunt Sally decided to pay his tuition, Masters attended the Lawrenceville School, a preparatory school in New Jersey, then for boys only. Once Bill began his education, his father considered him an adult and gave him little to no financial or family support, and so he rarely visited home. With the completion of his early education Masters then attended and graduated from Hamilton College in upstate New York. Afterward, he enrolled at the University of Rochester Medical School, from which he received his medical degree. He was a member of Alpha Delta Phi, and became a faculty member at Washington University in St. Louis. In 1942, he married his first wife, Elizabeth Ellis, who was known as Libby or Betty. The couple had two children.

== Career ==
=== Relationship with Virginia Johnson ===
Masters met Virginia E. Johnson in 1957 when he hired her as a research assistant to undertake a comprehensive study of human sexuality. Masters divorced his first wife, Elizabeth Ellis Masters, to marry Johnson in 1971. Masters and Johnson eventually divorced over two decades later but continued their professional collaboration.

== Death ==
William Masters suffered complications from Parkinson's disease and died in Tucson, Arizona, on February 16, 2001. Masters's second wife, Virginia Johnson, died in July 2013. Dr. Masters was survived by two children from his marriage to Elizabeth Ellis: Sarah Masters Paul, and William Howell Masters III. He was a church-going Episcopalian and a registered Republican.

== In popular culture ==
The American cable network Showtime debuted Masters of Sex, a dramatic television series loosely based on the 2009 biography of the same name, on September 29, 2013. The series stars Michael Sheen as Masters and Lizzy Caplan as Virginia Johnson.

Sheen has stated in an interview that he does not know what the real Bill Masters was like and he was doing his own interpretation in his portrayal of him.
