= Cardinal Carter Academy for the Arts =

Catholic high school in Toronto, Ontario, Canada

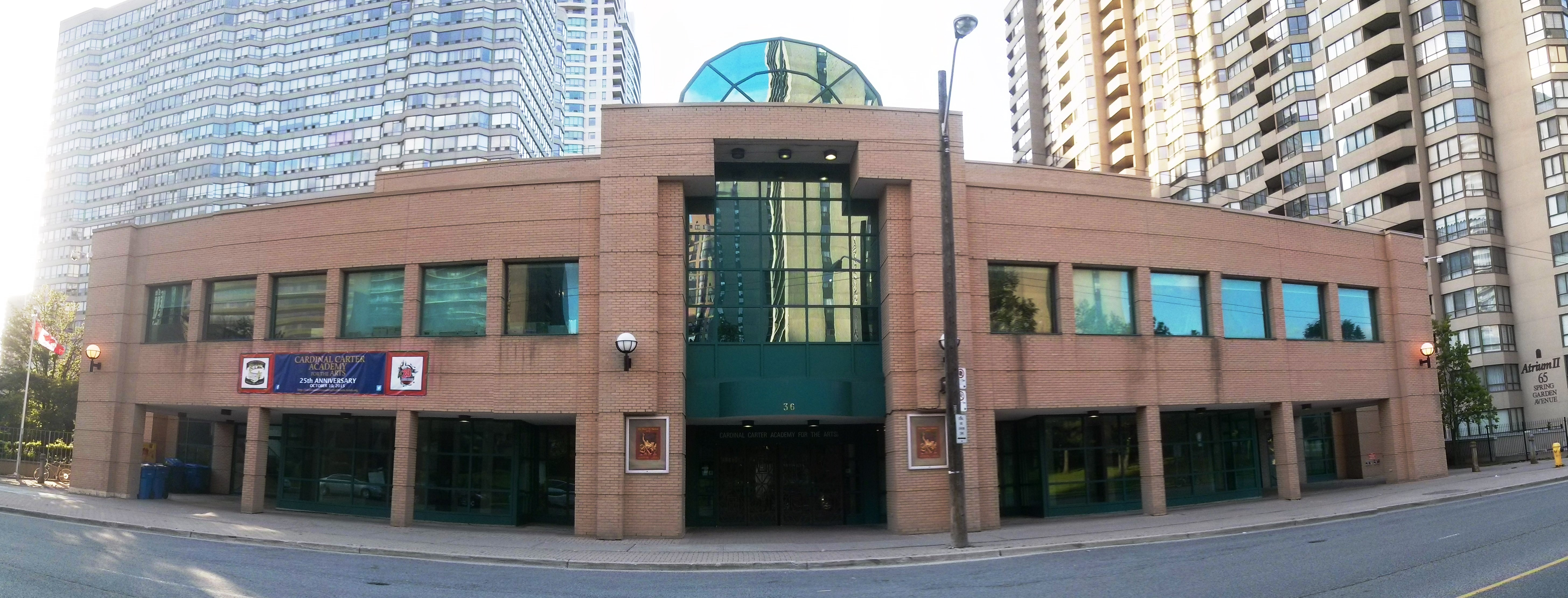

Location
- 36 Greenfield Avenue; Toronto, Ontario, M2N 3C8; Canada; 43.7640°N 79.4097°W

Information
- School type: Catholic High school Catholic Elementary school
- Motto: Artes Dei Gloria (Arts for the Glory of God)
- Religious affiliation: Roman Catholic
- Founded: 1990
- School board: Toronto Catholic District School Board
- Superintendent: John Shain Area 4
- Area trustee: Maria Rizzo Ward 5
- School number: 556 / 694550; 556 / 694509
- Principal: Linton Soares
- Grades: 7-12
- Enrolment: 659 (2017–18)
- Language: English
- Campus: Urban
- Colours: Navy, red, gold, khaki
- Parish: St. Edward
- Program Focus: Arts Focus; Cyber Arts

Cardinal Carter Academy for the Arts Catholic Education Centre (Satellite Campus)
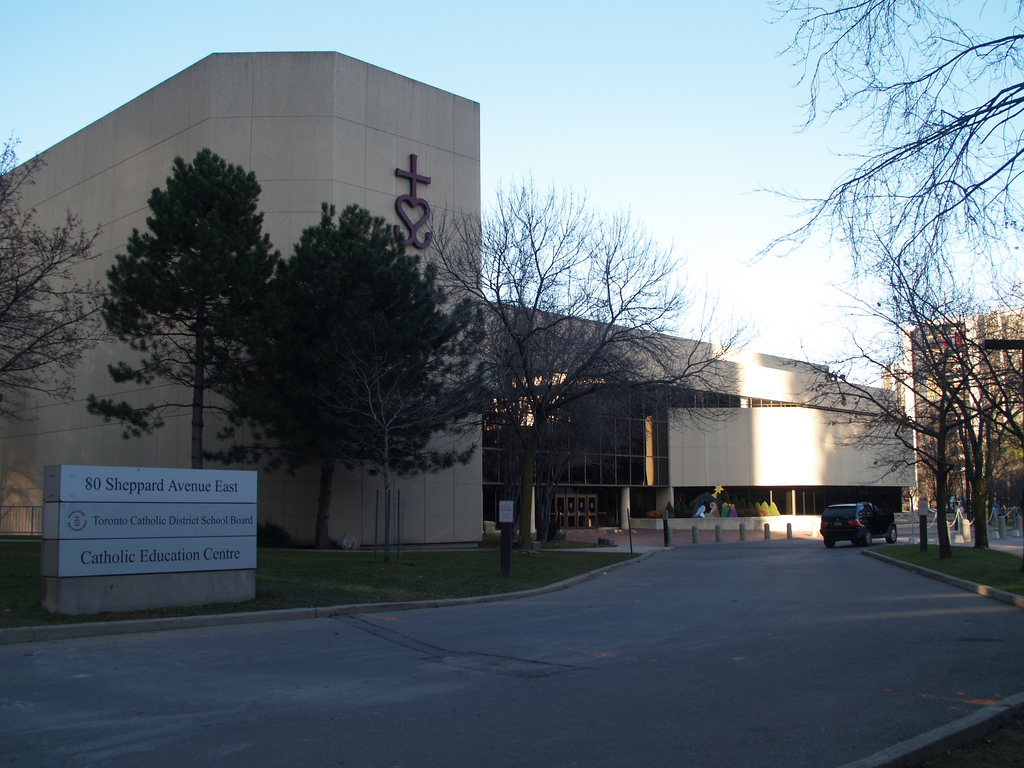

Location
- 80 Sheppard Avenue East; Toronto, Ontario, M2N 6E8; Canada; 43.7635°N 79.4078°W

Information
- Superintendent: John Shain Area 4
- Area trustee: Maria Rizzo Ward 5

Cardinal Carter Academy for the Arts (CCAA, Cardinal Carter, or Carter) is a Catholic arts high school located in Toronto, Ontario, Canada. Admission to the school is granted through an audition process. Serving students from grade 7 to 12, it is one of three schools in the Toronto Catholic District School Board that is an elementary and secondary hybrid (the others being Francis Libermann Catholic High School and St. Michael's Choir School).

== History ==
The school was named after Cardinal Gerald Emmett Carter, Ordinary of the Archdiocese of Toronto since 1979, a supporter of education and a patron of the arts.

Following the provincial government funding extension to Roman Catholic high schools in June 1984, the Metropolitan Separate School Board (now the Toronto Catholic District School Board) considered establishing a school for the visual and performing arts.

Cardinal Carter was built at the former St. Edward Catholic School which moved to the North York Board of Education's closed Burnett Public School on Eddiefield Avenue in 1985. That same year, it was the satellite campus of the newly established Mary Ward Catholic Secondary School. In 1986, the MSSB reached a deal with Tridel, a Canadian condominium developer, to acquire 0.41 acres (0.17 ha) of St. Edward property owned by the Board. In return, Tridel built a $10 million three-storey school on the board's 1.3-acre (0.53 ha) property. The first set of auditions was held in January 1990. The school facilities were designed by Makrimichalos Cugini Architects and features a proscenium stage, full orchestra pit, dance, drama, music and art studios, practice and rehearsal rooms.

Before the opening of Cardinal Carter, the building was then temporarily used by St. Bruno Catholic School, located in Downtown Toronto, which was closed due to health problems. Because of budget problems, the MSSB originally delayed the school's opening to September 1991 citing a tax increase to 9.5% and pulled Carter from the budget during its 26 April meeting. However, on 17 May 1990, the MSSB trustees reversed the decision proceeding the opening of Carter as planned.

On 4 September 1990, Cardinal Carter opened its doors to 269 pupils in the seventh, eighth, and ninth grades with Millie Seguin as its founding principal. The school was blessed in 1991 and the first graduates emerged in 1994.

Since 1999, the school operates a second campus using the TCDSB's Catholic Education Centre building just across the street.

== Admissions ==
The primary intake years are grades 7 and 9. Admission at senior levels is possible if space is available, and only at times of the school year when it is educationally sound to transition students.

Audition requirements differ with every arts area. Drama majors must complete a workshop and perform a memorized monologue. Dance students must participate in a 90-minute dance class and perform a one-minute improvisation. All music students will be given an ear training/rhythm test; furthermore, instrumentalists need to sight read a piece of music and perform a solo piece, while vocalists need to sing 'O Canada' without accompaniment. Visual artists must first submit a portfolio of assigned exercises (Round 1); further audition requirements are then sent out (Round 2).

== Arts ==
Students receive a balanced and thorough education in the arts, and through the arts. The integrated and accelerated arts program allows students to concentrate in one of four majors: music (vocal, band, string instruments), drama, dance, or visual arts. There is a theoretical and practical aspect within each art major.

=== Dance ===
Dance students learn both classical ballet and contemporary dance. They also learn about dance theory and composition to choreograph original performances.

Dancers perform in outreach performances, school liturgies and Dance Night, a year-end performance. Every two years, the Dance Department puts on a Christmas production of The Nutcracker.

The Dance facilities include two 40 feet wide, 30 feet deep studios with floor to ceiling mirrors, permanent ballet barres, and non-slip sprung hardwood floors.

=== Drama ===
The curriculum covers voice, movement, theatre games, mask, mime, musical theatre, improvisation, stage combat, theatre history, outreach performances, short film production and directing. Students can also participate in the Canadian Improv Games, the National Theatre School Festival and various short film competitions.

=== Instrumental music ===
The Instrumental Music Department includes Strings and Band. Music students perform many times during the year and host a Christmas and spring concert. Music students frequently participate in festivals and competitions, such as Kiwanis Music Festival and TCDSB Music Festival. The Music Department performs internationally on biennial music trips.

==== Strings ====
The Strings Department is organized into four orchestras. The Junior Strings Orchestra consists primarily of the students in Grades 7 and 8. Intermediate Strings include students in Grades 9 and 10. Senior Strings primarily include the students in Grades 11 and 12, with deserving younger musicians integrated into the ensemble. The Senior Chamber Strings are a chamber string orchestra who perform select standard repertoire for String Orchestra.

The Cardinal Carter String Orchestras have earned over 100 first-place finishes in the Kiwanis Music Festival.

CCAA Chamber Strings was the only Canadian string orchestra to perform at the Midwest Clinic in Chicago in 2008. CCAA Chamber Strings performed at Carnegie Hall in New York City in 2011.

==== Band ====
The Band Department is organized into the following ensembles: Junior Concert Band, which plays repertoire at the 200-300 level, Intermediate Concert Band, which plays repertoire at the 300-400 level, and Wind Symphony, which plays repertoire at the 400-500 level.

The Band Department regularly participates in the Ontario Band Association Concert Band Festival. The Wind Symphony performed at the Festival at Carnegie Hall in 2014.

=== Vocal ===
In all vocal music courses, students study theory, history, listening, dictation, ear training, sight singing/solfège and prepare for performance of choral repertoire, vocalises, and solos. Senior students plan and perform their own solo recitals.

Vocalists make up the choir for school Mass.

Students participate in the school's annual Christmas and spring music concerts as well as the sadly no longer annual Festival of Nine Lessons and Carols, held at various churches in the Greater Toronto Area. The Vocal Program has achieved a number of first-place finishes (platinum awards) at the Kiwanis festivals. Students have performed the Duruflé Requiem with the Brampton Symphony Orchestra, sacred concerts with Elmer Iseler Singers, and several performances of the Missa Gaia.

=== Visual arts ===
The Visual Arts curriculum covers drawing, painting, sculpture, installation art, photography, printmaking, media studies, performance art, design and information design. Art appreciation, theory and history are inclusive for each grade. Specializations and portfolio preparation for college, university and art based alternatives are provided for all senior students. The Visual Arts program further provides opportunities for students to take part in a variety of outreach community projects, interact with professional artists, experience current gallery trends and take part in interdisciplinary projects.

=== Specialist High Skills Major (SHSM) ===
SHSM is a specialized program approved by the Ministry of Education that allows students to focus their studies in a specific economic sector while still earning credits towards their Ontario Secondary School Diploma.

Cardinal Carter offers the SHSM program in Arts and Culture program for grades 11 and 12. Interested students apply at the end of grade 10.

Successful completion and graduation of the SHSM program grants a SHSM seal of distinction on the student's diploma, as well as a SHSM Record Card for documentation.

== Academics ==
Students must take a full academic course load in addition to their arts major. Cardinal Carter has a Gifted/Enriched program to further accommodate students with individualized needs.

The school has been continually ranked as one of the best performing high schools in Ontario based on academics by the Fraser Institute.

Cardinal Carter has earned a spot among the top 40 schools in the country as chosen by Maclean's and Today's Parent Magazine. CCAA was selected as a runner up in the "Classrooms of Creativity" category.

== Uniform ==
Required tops include a navy blue or white crested golf shirt or a white or light blue dress shirt. Optional tops include a crested cardigan vest, zippered jacket, crewneck pullover or zip polo, all of which must be worn over the golf shirt or dress shirt.

== Notable alumni ==
=== Dance ===
- Leah Miller, Television host
- Anjelika Reznik, Olympic gymnast

=== Drama ===
- Raymond Ablack, Degrassi: The Next Generation, Ginny and Georgia
- Lauren Dahl, The Last Don, Diagnosis: Murder
- Giacomo Gianniotti, Grey's Anatomy, Murdoch Mysteries
- Eliana Jones, Hemlock Grove
- Jamie Johnston, Degrassi: The Next Generation
- Caterina Scorsone, Grey's Anatomy and Private Practice

=== Music ===
- Toya Alexis, singer
- Natalie Di Luccio, vocalist
- Amanda Joy, Second Jen
- Alessandra Paonessa, vocalist
- Tony Yike Yang, youngest prizewinner of the International Chopin Piano Competition
- FrancisGotHeat, multi-platinum music producer
- Chelsea Clark, actor

== See also ==
- Education in Ontario
- List of secondary schools in Ontario
- Cardinal Carter Catholic High School
