= List of Party of Five episodes =

Party of Five is an American television teen and family drama created by Christopher Keyser and Amy Lippman that premiered on Fox on September 12, 1994, and ended on May 3, 2000. A total of 142 episodes were produced, spanning six seasons.

== Series overview ==
Season	Episodes	Originally released	
Season	Episodes	First released	Last released
1	22	September 12, 1994	March 15, 1995
2	22	September 27, 1995	March 27, 1996
3	25	August 21, 1996	April 2, 1997
4	24	September 17, 1997	May 13, 1998
5	25	September 16, 1998	May 19, 1999
6	24	October 5, 1999	May 3, 2000

== Episodes ==
=== Season 1 (1994–95) ===
No. overall	No. in season	Title	Directed by	Written by	Original release date	Prod. code	Viewers (millions)
1	1	"Pilot"	Richard Pearce	Christopher Keyser & Amy Lippman	September 12, 1994	101	12.8
Six months after their parents were killed in a car accident involving a drunk driver, the five Salinger orphans are struggling to make ends meet and keep their family together to raise their 10-month old newest brother Owen. They try to search for a replacement for Owen's 65-year-old nanny, Mrs. Kelleher, who suddenly quits. Bailey assumes most of the responsibility for the family and develops a romantic crush on the attractive grad student Kirsten Bennett, whom he hires on the spot as Owen's new nanny. The troubled Julia turns her back on the family and household chores after a classmate named P.K. shows an interest in her. After her heart is broken when P.K. breaks up with her, she longs for her mother's advice and comfort. Meanwhile, the womanizing and immature Charlie loses $12,000 of the family's money after being scammed by the friend-of-a-friend in an ill-conceived real estate investment. Joe Mangus, their late father's business partner at Salingers Restaurant, lends Charlie enough money to tide them over, on the condition that Charlie work at Salingers as a bartender, a job which Charlie accepts reluctantly. Young Claudia pawns her violin and announces that she'd rather be a regular kid than a child prodigy. Her violin instructor, Ross Werkman, reminds her that she has a rare gift and encourages her to stick with it. When Charlie moves back into his parents house full-time to look after his siblings, Claudia is forced to make a camping tent in the family living room as her sleeping quarters, unwilling to share a room with Julia or Bailey or baby Owen.
2	2	"Homework"	Richard Pearce	Christopher Keyser & Amy Lippman	September 19, 1994	102	8.7
Bailey begins having romantic dreams about Kirsten. Claudia tries to find their lost grandfather. Julia is tired of her life of studying; she starts going to parties with the outgoing Nina DiMayo, and begins to fail at school. Meanwhile, Charlie dumps his older mistress (guest star Laura Innes) and flirts with Kirsten. Bailey makes up an imaginary friend to get Kirsten's attention, and she accidentally tells everybody about it. Charlie and Kirsten kiss. Claudia finds a man named Jack Gordon (guest star Alan Young) who might be their grandfather, but Bailey finds that he is not. Charlie does not go out with Kirsten, for Bailey's sake.
3	3	"Good Sports"	Steve Robman	W.K. Scott Meyer	September 26, 1994	103	7.4
Bailey witnesses a fight between one of his football teammates and some members of an opposing team. When he refuses to name the teammate who was involved in the incident, aware that the teammate will be unfairly punished, he is suspended from the football team. While Charlie is against Bailey's choice to stay silent, Kirsten is supportive to Bailey in standing up for his principles. Meanwhile, Julia holds a party for Nina and her "new friends", but they quickly abuse her generosity by trashing the house. Kirsten starts dating a lawyer named George, which makes Charlie jealous and regrets not making his move on her. Because he lied about his profession, Kirsten dumps George, and accuses Charlie of being jealous and admits to being impressed with Bailey’s bravery.
4	4	"Worth Waiting For"	Stephen Cragg	Susannah Grant	October 3, 1994	104	7.3
Sex seems to be the only thing on everyone's mind, but no one answers Claudia's questions about it. Julia decides she's ready to go all the way with her school friend, Justin Thompson, but backs off. Meanwhile, Charlie and Kirsten finally go a date, but just as their romance is heating up, she learns that he used one of his weak pick-up lines on her. Elsewhere, Bailey likes Kate Bishop, the pretty customer he meets at his after-school job at a local shoe store, but is saddened to learn that she has a boyfriend.
5	5	"All's Fair"	Peter O'Fallon	Ann Lewis Hamilton	October 10, 1994	105	8.4
Charlie's ex-girlfriend, Rebecca, visits and turns to him for comfort, due to her failing marriage. They end up sleeping together, and now Charlie begins lying to Kirsten and Rebecca. Meanwhile, Bailey finds out that Kate's boyfriend, Tom, is too nice and feels badly trying to win Kate over. He eventually succeeds. Also, Julia tries to pass for 21 to get a job waitressing in a nightclub. Elsewhere, Claudia pretends to be younger so she can enter a violin competition.
6	6	"Fathers and Sons"	Ellen S. Pressman	Christopher Keyser & Amy Lippman	October 17, 1994	106	7.7
At work, Julia runs into her ex-one-time boyfriend P.K. He later shows up on her doorstep sporting a black eye and seeking refuge from his abusive stepfather. As the family takes in P.K., they soon worry that hiding him could get them in trouble with social services when P.K.'s mother calls the police to report his running away from home. Julia eventually gives P.K. enough money from her waitressing job for him to leave town for places unknown. Meanwhile, Joe promotes Charlie from bartender to night manager, but Charlie's not interested for he wants to find his own path in life. Also, Bailey tries to impress Kate's stern father.
7	7	"Much Ado"	Ken Topolsky	Hollis Rich	October 24, 1994	107	8.0
Kirsten finds out about Rebecca and breaks up with Charlie. Charlie sees Julia at the club and assumes that she is there partying. Meanwhile, Claudia becomes jealous of Bailey's new relationship with Kate and gives Kate the wrong message so she'll miss a date with Bailey. Also, Owen is rushed to the hospital with the flu.
8	8	"Kiss Me Kate"	Richard Pearce	Susannah Grant	November 2, 1994	108	9.9
Bailey is shocked when Kate tells him she plans to remain a virgin until she marries. When Bailey does not accept her decision and Kate does not change her mind, they break up. Meanwhile, Julia teams with a songwriter who wants to put her poetry into music. Claudia is named one of the Bay area's most gifted young musicians and lets her success go to her head as her self-absorbed attitude begins to alienate her siblings.
9	9	"Something Out of Nothing"	Steve Robman	Story by : Christopher Keyser & Amy Lippman; Teleplay by : Susannah Grant	November 7, 1994	109	8.0
A free-spirited friend of the family, named Greer Erikson, visits the Salingers. Her well-meaning interference causes problems for the Salinger siblings. Greer tries to boost Julia's confidence by sending her to a fashion photographer, and Julia spends $800 on the photo session. Greer also tries to help get Bailey over his breakup with Kate by fixing him up on a blind date. Bailey soon develops an attraction for Greer instead. Ross comes out of the closet and reveals to Claudia that he is gay. Meanwhile, Charlie searches for a new nanny for Owen.
10	10	"Thanksgiving"	Michael Engler	Christopher Keyser & Amy Lippman	November 14, 1994	110	8.4
As the Thanksgiving holiday draws near, the Salinger siblings finally meet Walter Alcott, the drunk driver who killed their parents whom was recently paroled from prison. Walter Alcott wants to see the Salingers in person. They each talk privately with Walter. Claudia visits him at a bookstore he manages just to see what he looks like. The angry Bailey also pays Walter a visit and tells him he wants Walter to suffer like they have. Bailey later leaves and shows up at Kate's house, where they reconcile. Julia assures Walter that she can forgive him for killing their parents. Finally, Charlie visits Walter to have a casual talk about moving on.
11	11	"Private Lives"	Peter O'Fallon	W.K. Scott Meyer	November 21, 1994	111	8.8
Mrs. Gideon, the social worker, shows up without notice and finds the house a complete mess. Julia gets to the house wearing her new waitress costume, and Claudia is missing, causing a very bad impression. They call the police and report Claudia. When the phone rings in the morning, they find Claudia in the kitchen; she blames them for ignoring her and not knowing anything about her life. Charlie has a secret and will not tell, so they think he might be on drugs. Morgan fires all the waitresses, but later he tries to get Julia back, unsuccessfully. Bailey and Julia play parents on Claudia's date, ruining it. Charlie reveals that he's back at school, taking night classes at Berkley. Bailey asks Kirsten to help them when Mrs. Gideon visits again, and they all act as a perfect happy family to her. Bailey and Charlie agree to help each other. Claudia asks Mrs. Gideon not to split them up. Owen takes his first steps.
12	12	"Games People Play"	Michael Engler	Susannah Grant	November 28, 1994	112	9.4
Kirsten and Charlie finally sleep together. Later, she is cold to him and tells him she slept with him because she is sick and scared. Bailey plans a trip with Kate. Her father wants to send her to boarding school in Connecticut, and Bailey finds out that she wants to go. They fight and Kate tells him she will have sex with him, but he refuses to because she does not mean that. Before Julia and her boss, Morgan, go on a date, Nina tells Julia to be mysterious and surprising, and to make him jealous. Claudia overhears their conversation and tries to do all that to get Artie's attention. Charlie tells Kirsten he loves her and will be there for her. She tells him she can not have children.
13	13	"Grownups"	Ellen S. Pressman	Ann Lewis Hamilton	December 12, 1994	113	8.2
Bailey meets Jill Holbrook, a pretty and outgoing coffee shop waitress he falls for and ends up sleeping with immediately after their first date. Meanwhile, Morgan begins to drink after his club is closed down and he is forced to pay a fine. Julia wants to help, but he does not accept her apology or her money to pay the fine. Claudia receives her first period. Also, Kirsten's family wants her to return home to Chicago.
14	14	"Not Fade Away"	Peter O'Fallon	Christopher Keyser & Amy Lippman	January 4, 1995	114	10.0
Claudia spends time thinking about converting to Judaism to be close to her schoolfriend Artie. Julia finds her mother's old journal and finds that her mother planned to have an affair with another man. In the meantime, Kirsten moves into Charlie's room and gets into a fight with Julia over taking up space in the house, and becomes jealous over the attention and dependency Claudia is giving her.
15	15	"It's Not Easy Being Green"	Michael Engler	Susannah Grant	January 11, 1995	115	9.5
Jealousy plagues everyone as Charlie tries to figure out what Kirsten's relationship with Ben Atkins is. Julia is surprised to find out that Justin is dating her bookish friend Libby Dwyer. Also, Claudia's relationship with Artie is in question when she takes over his role in the school play Oliver.
16	16	"Aftershocks"	Ken Topolsky	Ann Lewis Hamilton & Mark B. Perry	January 18, 1995	116	11.0
After an earthquake, Claudia and Jill start acting weirdly, especially Jill. Charlie is suspicious about Jill's behavior and he's convinced that the problem is drugs. Bailey at first refuses to believe Charlie's suspicions, but after confronting Jill, realizes it is true. Meanwhile, Julia's friendship with Libby is again shaken because of Julia's feelings for Justin.
17	17	"In Loco Parentis"	Ken Topolsky	Christopher Keyser & Amy Lippman	February 1, 1995	117	10.6
Jill shows up one night at the Salinger house after a minor car accident, and Bailey thinks she might be on drugs. When Bailey tries talking to Jill's mother about Jill's drug use, he learns that Jill (anticipating he would do just that) had already told her mother a false story about Bailey's harassing her. Meanwhile, Julia and Justin tell Justin's mother they're going out. When Justin gets angry with Julia for spending too much time with his prudish mother whom he cannot stand, she explains that she misses having a mother to talk to. Arnie's parents are breaking up, and Claudia makes a plan to get them back together, which fails. Elsewhere, Charlie tries to be a better father for Owen, and the baby says "Dad" to Charlie. Bailey goes to Jill's mother for help, but she does not care. Jill is missing and her nurse mother goes to Bailey for help, apologizing for her previous rudeness.
18	18	"Who Cares?"	Ellen S. Pressman	Susannah Grant	February 15, 1995	118	9.1
Bailey urgently travels to L.A. to find Jill, who is missing. After finding her, he tries to persuade her to return to San Francisco. In the meantime, everyone is too occupied and self-absorbed with their own life problems to plan Claudia's 12th birthday. Julia spends some time with Danny, a regular customer at the coffee shop who is HIV positive.
19	19	"Brother's Keeper"	Richard Chamberlin	Mark B. Perry	February 22, 1995	119	8.5
Upon receiving an incredible job opportunity with a very high salary, Charlie faces a dilemma when he realizes, in order to accept this position, the entire family would have to move to Seattle. His siblings immediately express their disapproval, and when Charlie attempts to make the decision for them, he risks losing his family for good. Meanwhile, as Bailey's math grades gradually slip, his teacher pairs him with Julia; because Bailey is so jealous of his sister's blossoming relationship with Justin, these tutoring sessions flare into a nightmare for both of them.
20	20	"The Trouble With Charlie"	Ken Topolsky	Christopher Keyser & Amy Lippman	March 1, 1995	120	8.1
Bailey has doubts when Kate, who has returned, and Jill both want to get back together with him and continue their relationship where it stopped. After thinking about it, Bailey chooses Jill. Meanwhile, Charlie becomes troubled when he refuses to let Claudia eat junk food and grounds her, takes away the television and does not give Bill, the nanny, a raise. After an argument with the family, Charlie decides to move out and find his own apartment. Also, Julia wins an award for her writing, but her siblings are humiliated by what she wrote about them.
21	21	"All-Nighters"	Steve Robman	Susannah Grant & Mark B. Perry	March 8, 1995	121	8.8
Bailey interferes in Jill's business when she decides to take over of preparations for a 36-hour school dance marathon. Julia does not want to rush into having sex with Justin. Claudia and her friend Artie witness a robbery at a convenience store which she assumes is the cause of her nightmares. Meanwhile, Charlie realizes that he needs his family now more than ever, so he's in doubts about leaving the house.
22	22	"The Ides of March"	Ellen S. Pressman	Christopher Keyser & Amy Lippman	March 15, 1995	122	11.8
In the season finale, Jill dies suddenly (off-camera) from a drug overdose. Bailey refuses to believe she's dead and tries to bury his grief by going out with Will, getting drunk, and behaving recklessly. In the meantime, Griffin Holbrook (guest star James Marsden), Jill's moody older brother, shows up and does not want to have any business with Julia, so he avoids her. Finally, Charlie and Kirsten get engaged.

=== Season 2 (1995–96) ===
No. overall	No. in season	Title	Directed by	Written by	Original release date	Viewers (millions)
23	1	"Ready or Not"	Peter O'Fallon	Christopher Keyser & Amy Lippman	September 27, 1995	9.7
The arrival of Charlie's old girlfriend, Pamela Rush, interrupts Kirsten and Charlie's wedding plans. She claims that Charlie fathered her four-year-old son, Spencer. Meanwhile, Will plays matchmaker for Bailey, who is still grieving over the death of Jill, by trying to set him up on a date with school friend Sarah Reeves. Justin returns from Europe and Julia learns that he was not alone. But she has yet to tell him that she spent her summer getting to know Jill's brother, Griffin (now played by Jeremy London). Note: Jennifer Love Hewitt joins the cast as Sarah Reeves.
24	2	"Falsies"	Ellen S. Pressman	Mark B. Perry	October 4, 1995	7.6
Claudia feels out of place during her first day of junior high. Will, along with Bailey, checks out a college on the East Coast. In San Francisco, Julia and Justin take action by organizing a school protest to a new rule that prohibits kissing in school, while Griffin continues to show an interest in Julia. Charlie tracks down Pamela. It turns out that Spencer Is not Charlie's son, but that Pamela was desperate for money. Kirsten wonders if he'll be happy with her, knowing that she can never have children. To reassure her, they decide to adopt Owen.
25	3	"Dearly Beloved"	Michael Engler	Lisa Melamed	October 18, 1995	8.5
After being irritated by the family's interference in her wedding plans, Kirsten and Charlie decide to run off to Reno and elope. Charlie's friend, Dudley, continues to plan their engagement party, despite the happy couple's disappearance. Meanwhile, Bailey decides to run for class vice president and Sarah volunteers to be his campaign manager. But when Sarah ends up doing all the work and Bailey pays less attention to her, she tells Bailey how she really feels about him. Also, Julia lies to Justin in order to spend time with the loner outcast Griffin.
26	4	"Have No Fear"	Rodman Flender	Melissa Gould	October 25, 1995	9.6
Joe suffers a heart attack and Charlie takes over management of Salingers. Meanwhile, Julia assumes Griffin will want to have sex with her, but when he asks to sleep with her, it turns out he literally wants to sleep. Also, Bailey injures a teammate during football practice, which makes him afraid he's going to injure someone else.
27	5	"Change Partners... and Dance"	Ken Topolsky	Susannah Grant	November 1, 1995	8.4
Claudia breaks her arm while ice-skating, and Ross worries about her future as a violinist. Julia gets Griffin a job at Salinger's Restaurant as a busboy after seeing his poor financial status, but Griffin does not show up for work on his first day and Charlie fires him quickly on the second day when Griffin slacks off, talks back to Charlie and almost gets into a fistfight with him. Meanwhile, Bailey and Sarah's relationship starts to get serious. A fortuneteller tells Kirsten that she would not marry Charlie. She convinces him to take dancing classes for their wedding, and they fight. Elsewhere, Julia sees Justin with another girl, and he is openly mean to her after learning that she has been spending time with Griffin because of his bad guy reputation. Julia gets upset with Griffin for not being romantic and getting fired from the job where Julia vouched for him. Griffin resents Julia trying to change him and that he never asked for a job or her charity or being romantically involved with her. Julia continues to mistakenly think that Griffin's lackadaisical attitude and his inability to express any emotion stems from indifference, similar to Julia's own over her parents deaths. Note: Swing band Big Bad Voodoo Daddy made an uncredited appearance in this episode.
28	6	"Analogies"	Ellen S. Pressman	Christopher Keyser & Amy Lippman	November 8, 1995	10.6
Kirsten's parents, Ellie and Gene, arrive suddenly to spend some time with them. Charlie tells Kirsten that she is like her mother, and she says she's not. Claudia does not like Griffin, so he tries to win her heart. Julia gets jealous and Griffin tells her that he misses having a little sister, while Claudia develops a crush on him. Determined to get into an out-of-state college to escape from his unhappy life, Bailey only gets a 900 on the SAT and his teacher offers him private lessons. He takes it again and gets the same score. Charlie tells him how it was when their parents were still alive, so Bailey decides to apply for college, writing about his mother in his essay.
29	7	"Where There's Smoke"	Daniel Attias	Mark B. Perry	November 15, 1995	9.2
A fire destroys the restaurant. The insurance company refuses to give Charlie the money because they think he did it. Even Kirsten begins to suspect that Charlie started the fire, but she helps him and they get the insurance money, but it is only half of the agreed amount since there is no evidence that Charlie intentionally started the fire. Meanwhile, Will asks Bailey if he can go out with Sarah, and he says 'yes', but later regrets and realizes he still likes her. Griffin steals money from one of the restaurant's employees, and he goes to jail. Julia finally sees that Griffin comes from an abused home; Griffin's father is a Major in the U.S. Army who yells and beats Griffin every day and has zero tolerance for insolence or loafing. When Charlie and everyone else is unsympathetic to Griffin's plight and refuses to help out, Julie approaches and begs Major Chase Holbrook to help Griffin and not abandon him. Julia's plea seems to work as Griffin's father hires a professional U.S. Army lawyer who works out a plea deal; Griffin will not do prison time, but has to go away for six months to a military academy in Louisiana. Also, Claudia meets a new school friend named Jody, who is a troublemaker, and the girl convinces her to smoke cigarettes and play pranks.
30	8	"Best Laid Plans"	Rodman Flender	Lisa Melamed	November 22, 1995	7.8
Kirsten prohibits Dudley to give Charlie a bachelor's party, so he asks Bailey if he would do it. Charlie runs into a desperate woman in the hallway of the hotel. They go to the bar and have some drinks, and she asks him to sleep with her. They go up to her room and Bailey sees them. Charlie tells her that he's in love with Kirsten and he would not sleep with the other woman. Bailey is mad at him, but when he finds out what happened, he says their parents would be proud of him. Meanwhile, Justin is mean to Julia for rejecting him for Griffin, and they run into each other at a concert. They see Justin's father with another woman. Claudia's plans to make a special night for Kirsten fail. Charlie is not sure about the wedding and flips a coin to decide.
31	9	"The Wedding"	Steve Robman	Christopher Keyser & Amy Lippman	December 13, 1995	10.5
It is the wedding day, but the insecure Charlie is not sure and asks Kirsten to wait six more months. Kirsten's mother, Ellie, tells Kirsten to pressure Charlie, and so she tells him that is now or never. He leaves the house. Just as she is announcing to everybody that the wedding is off, he shows up. He decided to get married in order not to lose her forever. He is waiting for her in the altar, but she never shows up. He goes to talk to her, and she tells him that they should not get married like this, afraid of what might happen in the future. She returned the wedding ring and leaves. Meanwhile, Bailey tells Will that he might love Sarah and she feels the same way, so Will decides to step out of the picture, letting them stay together. Also, Julia and Justin get drunk and have sex for the first time.
32	10	"Grand Delusions"	Ken Topolsky	Susannah Grant	December 20, 1995	10.5
Charlie decides to take Claudia with him to Mexico by using his two worthless honeymoon tickets. Charlie meets a woman at the hotel lobby, and Claudia gets mad at him, saying that he never loved Kirsten in the first place. She meets a boy who is the son of the hotel's owner and they kiss. In San Francisco, Julia and Justin can not stop having sex, and she gets confused when he is cold to her. Justin tells Julia that he does not want to go through the same thing again. Bailey joins Sarah at her grandmother's party. While reading grandma's old letters to her, she finds out that she's adopted. She is very confused about herself and goes to Bailey for comfort. Charlie tells Claudia that he misses Kirsten, and they run into her in the house when they get back.
33	11	"Unfair Advantage"	Michael Engler	Mark B. Perry & Lisa Melamed	January 3, 1996	11.0
A male teacher is hitting on Julia, and she feels uncomfortable. He asks her if he can give her a ride home and tries to kiss her. When confronted by Justin, Mr. Peck tells the Principal that Julia is the one harassing him. She gets scared and tries to change classes, but Charlie convinces her to confront him. Meanwhile, Sarah gets a credit card and begins to buy without bounds to at her parents for lying to her. It is her birthday and Bailey takes her to have dinner and they fight. He tells her that her parents love her, no matter what. Claudia is hanging out with Jody, and they steal a bottle of rum from the bar and get drunk. Also, Charlie reverts to his immature and womanizing personality when he flirts with a waitress at the restaurant, but when she tells him that she does not want anything with him, he gets angry and gives her a hard time. As a result, she quits.
34	12	"Hold On Tight"	Oz Scott	Melissa Gould	January 10, 1996	9.8
Claudia tells Charlie that Kirsten called. He goes after her, but she just wanted some help with the taxes. They have dinner and end up sleeping together. Meanwhile, Julia wants to move to the attic and Bailey says he should be the one moving there. Bailey sabotages Julia's audition for the lead singer of a band by sending Sarah, who gets the job. And in retribution, Julia sabotages Bailey's audition for a job, sending Justin, who also gets the job. The couples have a fight and when Bailey receives a letter that says he was accepted to attend a university in Massachusetts, Julia decides to let him have the attic. Elsewhere, Claudia takes off her cast and decides to quit playing the violin. The family discusses her decision, and she says she just wants to be normal. She says goodbye to her violin, putting it on the shelf in the basement.
35	13	"Poor Substitutes"	Davis Guggenheim	Christopher Keyser & Amy Lippman	January 17, 1996	10.4
After a woman mistakes Sarah for someone else's daughter, she decides to try to find her birth mother. They find her in the phone book, and Bailey calls her behind Sarah's back and goes to meet her. She's an actress named Robin Merin, and she tells him that she does not want to meet her. To protect Sarah's feelings, Bailey tells her that the woman he met was not her mother, killing her hopes. Meanwhile, Charlie tries to potty train Owen so he can go to pre-school. Claudia is shocked when she finds out that Kirsten is dating someone else. She tries to have Kirsten return to the family, but Kirsten tells her that she has to move on. Justin's friend Allison comes from England to visit him. At first, Julia is jealous, but they really get along. Allison comes on to Julia, who later reveals her secret that she is gay. Julia advises Allison not to run away from her problems. Note: This is Paula Devicq's last episode as a series regular. She is recurring from the rest of this season through season four.
36	14	"Strange Bedfellows"	Steve Robman	Mark B. Perry	January 24, 1996	9.1
Claudia is caught smoking, and her math teacher, Emily, advises Charlie to make a deal with her. The deal is that Claudia would not smoke if Charlie does not get involved with her teacher, which he does. Claudia walks on them making out, and she starts to smoke. Charlie dumps her, but when Emily gets back by giving Claudia a hard time in class, Jody asks her to reunite Charlie and Emily. Meanwhile, Will has a new girlfriend named Gina, who is really talkative and annoying, and he breaks up with her because Bailey does not like her. He regrets it and Bailey apologizes. They reunite and Bailey tries to like her for Will, despite the fact that Gina is still annoying. Also, Justin's mother is pregnant, and Justin worries about his father's affair.
37	15	"Benefactors"	Daniel Attias	Susannah Grant	January 31, 1996	10.7
One of Charlie's regular restaurant clients, an attractive and wealthy woman named Kathleen Isley, tries to seduce him, but he refuses. On Charlie and Emily's second date, she says she thinks it is too soon to sleep with Charlie, so he betrays her when he has sex with Kathleen behind Emily's back. Meanwhile, Julia is having problems in her computer class and asks a student to be her tutor. She does not want any help from Justin, so they make a deal: an 'A' for a date. Elsewhere, Bailey gets a $40,000 scholarship to attend a college in New Hampshire from an elderly stranger. During dinner, his benefactor asks too much about Bailey's parents. The next day Bailey goes to the cemetery and finds yellow roses by his mother's grave. After confronting him, Bailey figures that the man who is helping him is in fact his maternal grandfather Jacob 'Jake' Gordon (guest star Carroll O'Connor). Bailey asks him to meet the others, but he refuses, claiming that he does not want to associate himself with his daughter's children. As a result, Bailey tells him that he does not want anything from him. He surprises everybody at the end when he introduces himself during family dinner at Salinger's.
38	16	"Comings and Goings"	Ken Topolsky	Story by : Melissa Gould; Teleplay by : Lisa Melamed	February 7, 1996	11.2
Emily finds out about Charlie's affair with Kathleen and they break up. Kathleen tells him that she does not want to be just another woman he has sex with and then rejects the next day, and wants to take their relationship ahead. Meanwhile, Sarah is mad at Bailey because he did not tell her about his college plans by planning to move away to college to start his life over. Robin Merin meets Sarah for the first time and introduces herself as Sarah's biological mother. Robin later tells Sarah that she's leaving in two days for an acting job in Hollywood. Sarah asks her to stay, and Robin gives Sarah her cat, promising that she will return. Also, Claudia is trying to get closer to her grandfather Jake, and she asks him to move into the house. Julia tells her how much their mother hated him for abandoning her and their grandmother. Jake tells Julia that he wants to be a part of the family, and so she accepts him, thinking that their mother would have done the same.
39	17	"Valentine's Day"	David Semel	P.K. Simonds	February 14, 1996	9.9
It is Valentine's Day. Bailey has unromantic plans to attend a Monster Truck Rally, and Sarah does not like it. An old friend (guest star Ivan Sergei) of hers returns from Argentina, and Bailey gets jealous. They go to a bar, and he reads a poem that Bailey thinks was written for Sarah. Bailey punches him and realizes he was wrong. He tries to be romantic to Sarah to make up for his mistake. Meanwhile, Kathleen loans money to Charlie so he can hire a new chef to grow the business. Charlie takes her for a romantic weekend after she is demoted from her job as a producer at a local TV station. Griffin returns to town to visit Julia in which he decides to leave military school. Julia asks Justin to help him, although he does not like Griffin, whom he sees as a loser (as does everyone else). Seeing that Justin has feelings for Julia, Griffin tells her that he's in love with her and he takes off to return to military school. Justin asks Julia to be his fiancée and she tells him that she's late and might be pregnant.
40	18	"Before and After"	Steve Robman	Christopher Keyser & Amy Lippman	February 21, 1996	11.7
Julia is pregnant. She's not sure if she wants to have an abortion. Charlie finds her pregnancy test in the trash and talks to her. Claudia finds out and gets shocked. Bailey and Sarah plan on sleeping together, but she makes it too special. Bailey asks her to make it simple, but Julia's news scares them. Julia tries to talk with Sarah about her pregnancy, but Sarah says that if her mother decided to have an abortion, she would not be there. Julia has a miscarriage. Claudia apologizes to Julia.
41	19	"Altered States"	Michael Engler	Susannah Grant	February 28, 1996	9.6
Julia does not want to return to school following her miscarriage, and when she does, she feels awful and guilty. She lies to Justin and Charlie, and runs away to New Orleans to meet Griffin at his military academy. They spend time together, talk about what happened to her, and he tells her to go back home. Meanwhile, Bailey is jealous about Sarah for wearing tight clothes in her shows and for hanging out too much with her new band. They fight because she thinks he's controlling her too much. Elsewhere, Kathleen wants to be more in Charlie's life despite the fact that Bailey and Claudia do not like her very much due to her controlling and possessive nature. She invites the whole family to go to Hawaii for a vacation, and Charlie gets mad at her because he wants to keep their relationship casual. He finally tells Kathleen that he does not love her, and she attempts suicide, which makes him decide to stay with her for the time being.
42	20	"Happily Ever After"	Rodman Flender	Story by : Lisa Melamed; Teleplay by : P.K. Simonds & Melissa Gould	March 20, 1996	9.6
Jake is missing during a business trip, and Bailey worries about him never returning. Jake does comes back and apologizes, but Bailey can not get over it. A woman calls Jake at the house, saying she's his daughter and is getting married. Bailey investigates and learns that Jake has another daughter from a second marriage, whom he also walked out on just like he did with the Salingers' mother. Bailey, trying to protect his family, kicks Jake out of the house, which divides the family. Later, Bailey talks to him and asks him not to disappear entirely. Meanwhile, Kathleen wins a TV award and declares on television that she loves Charlie, who makes up a story about reuniting with Kirsten just to dump her. Kathleen finds out the lie and decides to get back at Charlie, saying that she will buy the restaurant and close it down as payback.
43	21	"Spring Breaks: Part 1 & 2"	Daniel Attias	Mark B. Perry	March 27, 1996	11.1
44	22	"Spring Breaks: Part 1 & 2"	Steve Robman	Christopher Keyser & Amy Lippman	March 27, 1996	11.1
Bailey is feeling distant from Sarah because she is spending all her free time with the band. She and Matt get robbed in an alley, and they end up in the hospital with minor injuries. Matt kisses Sarah, and she tells Bailey. They have another argument, and she says she has to be more on her own. Meanwhile, Julia joins a photography class after Justin turns it down, and she meets a boy named Ian. They are taking pictures on the street when she spots Justin strolling with another girl, named Corey (guest star Kate Hudson). Corey flirts with Justin, and Ian kisses Julia. Claudia grows tired of Jody after she drags Claudia to a party where she is pressured to make out with a boy. Claudia tells Jody she wants things to be the way they were, and not hanging out with boys all the time. Also, Joe arrives back in town and is worried because they might lose the restaurant after Charlie reveals that Kathleen has put together an investment group to buy the building housing it in order to close it down in retribution for their breakup. The angry and frustrated Charlie goes out, gets drunk and gets arrested for starting a brawl at a local bar, and Joe is forced to bail Charlie out of jail. Everyone unfairly blames Charlie for what is happening to the restaurant (yet no one thinks about blaming Kathleen). Claudia tells Charlie she would not forgive him because the restaurant was a piece of their parents. At the end, a devastated Charlie goes to Kirsten asking her to get back together, but it is too late. She tells him that she will marry Michael the next week. One week later The scorned and vindictive Kathleen is still hell-bent on taking and closing down the restaurant as part of her personal vendetta to make Charlie suffer for breaking up with her. Everyone continues to unfairly blame Charlie for dumping Kathleen which has led to her turning against the Salinger family. Ostracized by everybody he knows, Charlie is forced to ask Jake for help to find a way to stop the restaurant from going out of business. At the same time, Charlie continues to try to win back Kirsten by literally stalking her at her job, and later showing up at her pre-wedding party urging her to come back to him. Charlie eventually shows up at Kirsten's wedding and she finally runs away with him. Meanwhile, Bailey breaks up with Sarah because he does not want her to feel sorry for him as he plans to leave town after graduation for college (without saying goodbye to anyone) to start his life over. A little later, Jake tells Bailey that he has to decide what to do with his college money: Jake can use Bailey's $40,000 scholarship money to save the restaurant by bribing the building owners not to sell the restaurant to Kathleen and her investment group, or send Bailey away to college. After thinking about it all night, Bailey reluctantly decides to save the restaurant and stay in town to be close to Sarah. Also, Julia and Justin decide to break up due to their differences and indifference to each other's recent actions. Elsewhere, Claudia becomes more tired of Jody and her boyfriend, so they split up. Claudia asks Ross to be her tutor as she starts playing the violin again. At the end, as the family sorrowfully looks at the closed down Salinger's Restaurant, Joe arrives with good news that the sale for the restaurant somehow fell through and the restaurant is now back in their ownership. Neither Charlie or Bailey tell anyone the truth, and they quietly reconcile during the celebration. Note: This is Scott Grimes' last appearance as a series regular. He is on recurring status from season three through season five, as well as Michael Goorjian's last episode as a series regular. He goes back on recurring status for the rest of the show's run.

=== Season 3 (1996–97) ===
No. overall	No. in season	Title	Directed by	Written by	Original release date	Viewers (millions)
45	1	"Summer Fun, Summer Not"	Steve Robman	Christopher Keyser & Amy Lippman	August 21, 1996	9.6
Having graduated from high school and working all summer at Salingers Restaurant, Bailey and Will plan a trip to Mexico for Labor Day, but Sarah and Will's girlfriend, Gina, decide to tag along. Unfortunately, they never make it to Mexico when their jeep breaks down in the middle of an unfamiliar neighborhood in downtown San Diego. As a result, Sarah and Gina desert the guys and head back to San Francisco on a bus. When Bailey and Will try to look for a telephone to call for help, they return to the jeep only to find it gone, having been stolen by unknown locals because Bailey unwisely left the keys in the jeep's ignition system. Bailey and Will have a fistfight because each blames the other for their predicament, but they realize that ten years of friendship is not worth a fight. Back in San Francisco, Kirsten's mother, Ellie, is spending a few days living at the Salinger house with Charlie and Kirsten because her marriage is falling apart. She tells Kirsten that Gene discovered about an old affair of hers, and Kirsten would not forgive her until she forgives Charlie. Meanwhile, Julia, working all summer as a receptionist, runs into Griffin, who has arrived back in town without telling her. He tells her that after serving his sentence, he returned to visit his mother, but unwilling to live with his authoritarian father, he joined the Merchant Marines and is currently on shore leave for a few weeks. Julia gets somewhat angry that Griffin never answered her letters that she wrote to him while he was in New Orleans, because he claims that he is not the type of person who communicates or writes letters. He tells her he is still in love with her. Also, Claudia returns home from summer camp in love with a boy who everybody thinks is made up, but he comes to visit Claudia and their disbelief infuriates her.
46	2	"Going, Going, Gone"	Michael Engler	P.K. Simonds & Mark B. Perry	August 28, 1996	9.3
Will is leaving for college in Seattle and his new roommate, Tucker, comes to meet him. Bailey feels threatened by his presence, and they have a fight. The authorities find and return Bailey's jeep (but stripped of several parts including all four tires), and shortly afterwards, he decides to live in a dorm to meet people and move on with his life. Kirsten gets a job far away and they have to deal with the distance. She tells Charlie that if they were married things might have been different. Meanwhile, Julia wants the immature and irresponsible Griffin to find a place of his own and gives him some money, but he spends all the money (and his) buying her a car to impress her. Later, Griffin shows up unannounced at an office building where Julia works as a receptionist wanting to hang out with her and refuses to leave. After Griffin confronts and mouths off to Julia's stern boss for making her work too hard, Julia gets fired. Afterward, Julia and Griffin have a serious argument about the incident where after Griffin brushes it off, the frustrated Julia gets angry and she tells him to grow up and stop acting like a lovesick wild child. Griffin reacts by angrily yelling back at Julia, claiming that he's always had a problem with authority stemming from the lifelong abuse and mistreatment by his abusive, military-minded father. Afterwards, Griffin finally accepts the fact that he is, and always will be, an immature loser and slacker with no ambition, so he decides to leave town to settle in San Diego with the Merchant Marines to move on with his life and give Julia some space, but he tells Julia that he may return for her some day. Elsewhere, Claudia wants her relationship with Byron to be just like Julia and Griffin's, but Byron is more interested in Julia than in her. As a result, Claudia breaks up with Byron and unfairly blames Julia for stealing her boyfriend.
47	3	"Short Cuts"	Ellen S. Pressman	Lisa Melamed	September 4, 1996	8.1
Bailey meets a guy named Cooper at his first day of college. Cooper convinces Bailey to take easy classes so he can make good grades and have time to have fun. Bailey faces a very difficult computer test and finds cheating as the only way out. At Grant High School, Sarah, Julia and Justin are seniors competing for a writing competition that gives a college spot. Sarah and Julia are writing about their family dramas and Justin decides to write about Julia's pregnancy, which makes her really furious. After Kirsten's boss discovers that she copied her essay from a book, Charlie decides to help her and accidentally finds her anti-depressives prescription. Kirsten reveals that she has been diagnosed as a manic depressive which the symptoms apparently surfaced the previous year shortly after their aborted wedding. She loses her PhD and her job.
48	4	"Deal With It"	Dennie Gordon	Susannah Grant	September 11, 1996	9.2
Kirsten becomes more and more depressed, and not even a job as Salinger's hostess makes her feel better. Charlie tries to help her as much as he can, but nothing seems to work, yet he stubbornly refuses to give up on her. He wants her to get better fast and medication can take six weeks. Meanwhile, Cooper lets Bailey crash at his place. Julia starts to date him, and things get awkward between the three of them. Bailey asks Julia not to date his friend, but she decides to date him anyway. Later, she realizes how much she and Cooper do not have in common. Bailey is looking for a new place and finds a cheap apartment with a good roommate, an older woman named Callie Martel, who Sarah really does not like, but Bailey tells her not to worry. Claudia has to find a plumber to fix the pipes and gets yelled at by Charlie because it costs $3,000, but she says she's only age 13 and that was not her job. Note: This is Alexondra Lee's first appearance on the show as Callie Martel.
49	5	"Mixed Signals"	Ken Topolsky	Christopher Keyser & Amy Lippman	September 18, 1996	8.9
Cooper wants to sleep with Julia, but she tells him that she is not ready because of her pregnancy scare. Julia then tries to see if she can go through with sleeping with Cooper, but she can not so they break up for good. After Bailey moves out of the house, Claudia finally takes down the camping tent in the living room where she has been sleeping for the past two years and moves into his old bedroom. Jody tells Claudia that her mother's new live-in boyfriend came into her room one night and kissed her, but Jody begs Claudia not to tell anyone because the boyfriend has been a positive influence in Jody's mother's life because she has stopped drinking, using drugs, has gotten a steady job, and so it would devastate her to learn that the boyfriend is a suspected pedophile. Claudia invites Jody to stay for a couple of days at the Salinger household which drags on into over one week. After Charlie tells Claudia that Jody cannot sleep over anymore, she finally confides in him that Jody's mother's boyfriend is sexually abusing her. Meanwhile, Kirsten tries a new anti-depressent medication which her depression turns into compulsive cleaning and organizing, which drives her crazy and she decides to go off the medication, but she immediately becomes depressed and withdrawn more than ever. Elsewhere, Callie tells Bailey that her old boyfriend, Tom, is going to be at the art show she's appearing in to display her paintings, and asks Bailey to pretend to be her boyfriend so he will stop asking her out. Bailey says he'll help her out, but then finds out that Tom is his art professor. Later, Jody angrily confronts Claudia for telling Charlie about her mother's boyfriend's advances and adding that Charlie told Jody's mother, who reacted by throwing her boyfriend out, and then fell off the wagon by getting drunk and is then arrested and jailed ... exactly as Jody feared would happen. Social Services is sending Jody to live with her divorced father far away. After Claudia has an argument with Charlie for betraying her trust about Jody, she makes a phone call to Kirsten's parents.
50	6	"Going Home"	Daniel Attias	Christopher Keyser & Amy Lippman	September 25, 1996	9.1
Kirsten's parents, Gene and Ellie, arrive and Charlie gets furious with Claudia for telling them about Kirsten's worsening mental problems since he does not want help dealing with Kirsten due to his stubborn pride. Gene keeps blaming Charlie for Kirsten's worsening mental condition and threats to sue him. Ellie can not interfere or side with Charlie this time because she does not want to ruin her marriage again. They decide to take Kirsten back to Chicago to commit her to a mental hospital, and Charlie tries to stop them. Eventually, they call a truce and all ask Kirsten what she wants to do, but she is too withdrawn and disturbed by this point into a child-like state to decide or understand anything. Meanwhile, Julia and Sarah travel to Whitmore University in New Hampshire for their college interviews, but they can not keep their minds away from home. Julia realizes it is better to go to a college close to home. After Bailey has an argument with Charlie about keeping Kirsten's mental problems a secret, he goes back to his apartment where Callie confides in him that she is having similar problems with her estranged father, who is having a 60th birthday party that weekend, and she and Bailey drink to celebrate their independence from their dysfunctional families. After Charlie caves in and allows Gene and Ellie to take the near-catatonic Kirsten away to have her committed, Bailey and Julia decide to go home to comfort Charlie. Claudia can not forgive herself for what happened, but Charlie tells Claudia that it was not all her fault.
51	7	"Personal Demons"	Michael Engler	Mark B. Perry	October 30, 1996	9.5
Charlie is angry and frustrated because Kirsten is gone from his life. A social worker named Grace Wilcox comes by the restaurant looking for support in her feed-the-homeless program. She wants the leftovers from Salinger's, but Charlie kicks her out of the place. An old friend of Nick Salinger's named Earl arrives looking for a job, and Charlie gives him one because his father used to know him. Claudia believes that everything bad happening is the house's fault, so she gets an exorcist. Someone opens an account in the name of Nick Salinger, and they think it was the exorcist, but actually it was Earl. Meanwhile, Bailey tells Callie that the last time he had sex was two years ago. She seduces him, and they sleep together. Sarah is throwing a Halloween party, and Bailey goes so he would not feel so bad for cheating on her. Julia is upset because Justin is dating a new girl and tries to ruin everything, but regrets it and gets them back together. Bailey has a fight with Sarah and goes to Callie for comfort, but she is with another guy, so Bailey decides to look for comfort in a beer.
52	8	"Not So Fast"	Ken Topolsky	Karen Krenis	November 6, 1996	9.8
Julia meets a Stanford teacher, who is also a writer. They become friends, and she gets inspired to write. She asks for his opinion, and he tells her that she's not good. She is devastated, but after she finds out that her mother only chose music after college, she realizes that it is too soon to decide what to do for the rest of her life. An old violinist colleague of Diana named Avery Baltus introduces himself to Claudia and tries to develop in her Diana's talent with the violin. Claudia gets overexcited and Charlie tells her not to hurry, that she still has her whole life ahead, but she is stubborn and decides to enter the conservatory. Elsewhere, Bailey has the chicken pox, and Sarah takes care of him, but he does not want to deal with his guilt over cheating on her. They have a fight, but Sarah loves him too much to stay mad at him forever. Note: This is Alexondra Lee's first episode credited as a series regular after recurring for the previous episodes this season.
53	9	"Gimme Shelter"	Steve Robman	Susannah Grant	November 13, 1996	10.2
Charlie has a slogan contest at Salinger's, and the winner wants to bring homeless people to have dinner at the restaurant. Charlie has to kick them out so his clients would not leave, and Grace prints in the newspaper a bias opinion what he did, giving him a hard time. They have a discussion, and after Grace admits being wrong about him, they come up with a solution: to allow one evening per week to close the Salinger's Restaurant for a feed-the-homeless dinner. Meanwhile, Sarah is worried because Bailey is drinking too much, but he says he's only celebrating. He tries to get on the college hockey team, but he's not in good shape, so he gets invited to join the wrestling team, which is the worst at the college and his coach, Mr. Petrocelli, is too lenient on the team. Bailey does not support Sarah's new job, and they have a fight. She says he's changed since he moved in with Callie. Julia is having problems with the roofers, Sam and his brother Alec. Alec offers her pot, and she turns it down. She talks with his brother, Sam, and he fires Alec. They flirt. Also, Claudia tries to get back at Charlie for not letting her go to the conservatory.
54	10	"Close To You"	Vicki Jackson LeMay	Catherine Butterfield	November 20, 1996	10.0
Bailey saves Callie from being date raped. She is scared of going out of the apartment, and Sarah tries to be her friend and wonders why she does not have many female friends. Meanwhile, Charlie is helping Grace with her homeless program. He worries about her safety because she lives in a dangerous neighborhood. She tries to kiss him, but he tells her that he has someone – Kirsten. After Sam gets fired for not covering the roof, Julia rehires him from her own money. He discovers her lie, and she kisses him. Elsewhere, Claudia is offered a column in the school paper, and she soon realizes that something's up with Bailey due to his moody behavior. Callie tells him that she wants someone like him.
55	11	"I Do"	Ellen S. Pressman	P.K. Simonds & Lisa Melamed	November 27, 1996	7.6
Joe is marrying a younger woman and wants the wedding held at the Salinger house, which reminds Charlie of his own aborted wedding to Kirsten. Charlie realizes that if he and Kirsten had gotten married, they would be celebrating their first anniversary. Charlie asks Grace to be his date at the wedding, but she gets confused when he makes a speech that is definitely about Kirsten. She tells him to make decisions about his life. Meanwhile, Sarah wants to fix Callie with her cousin to keep her away from Bailey, but Callie turns it into a double date right away. She believes that she and Bailey are drifting apart, and she decides to sleep with him, but Bailey cannot do it. They promise to give it another try, but Bailey sleeps with Callie again. Elsewhere, Sam does not want anything with Julia and Claudia says she's pathetic, but Julia insists and Sam decides to return to the house.
56	12	"Desperate Measures"	Michael Engler	Mark B. Perry	December 11, 1996	10.4
Charlie decides to go to Chicago to see Kirsten and leaves Julia in charge of the household chores. Kirsten is very happy to see him, although Ellie is not. She tells him that she wants to run away to San Francisco on a road trip, but halfway there she becomes depressed and withdrawn again and Charlie realizes she's not ready to go back and they return to Chicago. Kirsten tells Charlie that he is part of her mental problems. Charlie leaves her there. Back in San Francisco, Julia is more concerned about her personal life and going out with Sam than her little brother and sister. Claudia claims to be sick, but Julia does not believe her and thinks she's faking to gain attention. Julia continues spending all her time with Sam until she gets a phone call the very next day from the local hospital, saying Claudia had collapsed at school the previous day from appendicitis and had a surgery. Claudia will not forgive Julia for ignoring her until she overhears how sorry she is. Bailey lies to Sarah in order to not sleep with her. He skips wrestling practice, and Sarah finds a drunk Bailey passed out at his place. He tells her he slept with Callie, but they do not break up. Callie is tired of being used by Bailey.
57	13	"Christmas"	Dennie Gordon	Susannah Grant	December 18, 1996	10.6
It is Christmas time and the Salinger's grandfather Jake Gordon comes back. Charlie decides to get rid of all Kirsten's stuff so he can finally move on with his life. He tries to help a homeless man at the restaurant find a job and place to live, but later learns that it was all a waste because the homeless man suffers from the exact same mental illness as Kirsten. Sarah and Callie are away for the holidays. Bailey, alienated with his family, wants to spend Christmas all by himself, but Coach Petrocelli does not let him and instead asks Bailey over to his place to watch wrestling on TV, where they bond by talking about Bailey's dead parents and Petrocelli's failed marriage and a daughter who never calls or writes. Meanwhile, Julia notices that Jake can not see very well, and he tells her he's going blind. Charlie sees him leaving early Christmas morning, and Jake says he has to go for a chemotherapy appointment for cancer and he does not want to be a burden on them anymore. Charlie agrees not to tell anyone about Jake's failing health. Julia asks Bailey to spend Christmas in the house, and he brings Coach Petrocelli with him since Coach's daughter is not coming to visit anymore. Stuart gives Claudia a very expensive gift and she tries to give him a bad gift, but he loves it. She tells him that she does not like him in that way, and he gets mad, but apologizes and stays for Christmas dinner. Grace shows up and Charlie invites her to stay, and they all happily celebrate Christmas.
58	14	"Life's Too Short"	Eric Jewett	Lisa Melamed & Christopher Keyser & Amy Lippman	January 8, 1997	9.56
Libby Dwyer, Julia's old friend, has killed herself. Justin and Julia feel like if they paid more attention to her she would be alive. Her death makes everybody wonder what they are doing with their lives as they find her journal, and by reading it, they realize that the pressure for Libby to study hard to enter college was too much for her to take. Sarah realizes that life's too short to spend it with a ruined relationship, so she decides to break up with Bailey, who takes it very hard and begins drinking even more. Meanwhile, Charlie is having some friends over for his high school reunion. He misses the good old days, but when the truth comes up about his friends troubled lives, Charlie realizes his high school life was not as good as he remembered.
59	15	"Significant Others"	Ken Topolsky	P.K. Simonds	January 15, 1997	9.92
Bailey is very excited with wrestling and wants to tryout for All Stars. Although Coach Petrocelli does not think he is able, Bailey gets obsessed to win. He wants someone to be there for him, but Callie is mad at him and wants him to move out. Everybody else is busy but Claudia, who misses him at home, and she shows up. Afterwards, Bailey celebrates every victory with a few drinks, and every time he gets more and more drunk. Meanwhile, Julia finds out that Sam was engaged, and she joins him in his dinner with his ex-fiancée. She is getting married, and Sam realizes he still loves her. Elsewhere, Charlie gets an award for helping the homeless, and he realizes how much he likes Grace when another man asks her out.
60	16	"I Declare"	Michael Engler	Chris Levinson	January 22, 1997	9.87
Bailey is not doing so well in school due to his increasing drinking. Callie throws a big party at their place and the landlord threats to kick them out for the loud noise and not paying the rent on time. He is trying to stay sober, but he finds it very hard. Unable to keep up with school, Bailey decides to quit some classes. Meanwhile, Charlie does not want to rush things with Grace, but the more they try to slow it down, the more they want to be together, so they sleep together. Julia is accepted in Stanford, but is not sure she wants to go. She wants some time off from studies and to find herself. Charlie thinks it is all Sam's fault for influencing her. Elsewhere, Ross is dating one of Claudia's teachers, and she outs him to the entire school. She tries to fix it, but Ross tells her it is not that easy.
61	17	"Misery Loves Company"	Rodman Flender	Mark B. Perry	January 29, 1997	10.43
Will surprises Bailey showing up at his place for a weekend visit. After seeing how frequently (and how much) Bailey drinks beer and hard liquor on a daily basis, Will thinks Bailey drinks too much after learning that he never appears to stop. Will asks Sarah what is going on, but she does not want to talk about Bailey because of their recent breakup... because of Bailey drinking all the time. Before leaving town to return to college, Will privately tries to advise Bailey about cutting back on his excessive drinking, but Bailey convinces Will that it is no big deal. Callie asks Bailey to move into her room. Meanwhile, Grace's apartment burns down, so she moves into the Salinger house. Charlie does not want Julia to turn down Stanford. Julia, angry with Charlie, moves to Sam's so she would not have to listen to him. Charlie does not want her there, and they have a big fight. Upset over Julia invading his privacy, Sam tells Julia she should go back to the house. Seeing how drunk that Bailey frequently is, Claudia tries to get Bailey to stop drinking, but he ignores her. Note: Bailey shows Will his fake ID and Will states there is 'No way he could pass for twenty-seven'. At the time of filming, Scott Wolf was in fact twenty-seven.
62	18	"MYOB"	Daniel Attias	Lisa Melamed	February 5, 1997	10.72
Bailey is spending so much money on drinking that he can not even afford rent. Julia wants to get Bailey and Sarah back together, but she's still very mad at him and Bailey continues being rude and belligerent (due to being drunk all the time). Sarah warns Julia about Bailey's drinking problem, but Julia does not believe it. Julia gets Bailey a job with Sam at another construction site after seeing how short on money that Bailey has. Bailey steals expensive liquor from the house he was working on and gets fired. After Julia confronts Bailey by asking if he has a drinking problem, he refuses to give an answer and tries changing the subject. Julia wonders if what Sarah told her is true. They try to talk to Bailey about it, but he will not listen. Taking advantage of Julia and Charlie's fight, Bailey gets Charlie to support him. Meanwhile, Julia and Claudia do not like Grace living at their house. Grace begins to think that moving in with Charlie was not a good idea after she has an encounter with a woman at a grocery store while shopping with Charlie and Owen in which the woman mistakes Grace (a black woman) as being Owen's nanny instead of Charlie's girlfriend. Also, Charlie tells Claudia she should try to be Grace's friend, so Claudia offers to volunteer at her program, but that does not last long. It is revealed that the non-maternal Grace can not stand the kids. Charlie wonders if Grace really wants to be there.
63	19	"Point of No Return"	Michael Engler	Susannah Grant	February 12, 1997	10.90
Grace's friendly and liberal African American parents, Martin and Rose, are spending time with them, and Grace does not like it since they seem to try to give them advice, but Charlie does not seem to mind. Meanwhile, Claudia is spending time with Avery, which makes his son jealous of her. Bailey spends all his money in drinking and can not afford a clown for Owen's third birthday party, so he dresses as a clown. He gets to the party drunk and ruins it with his antics and belligerence. Afterwards, Martin tells Charlie that Bailey might have a drinking problem, but Charlie still refuses to accept that idea, even though everybody else thinks so too. They all convince Charlie that Bailey has a serious drinking problem. Also, Julia breaks up with Sam because he's a racist.
64	20	"Intervention"	Steve Robman	Christopher Keyser & Amy Lippman	February 19, 1997	12.68
The Salinger family tries to solve Bailey's drinking problem. Claudia calls him and tells a story about Owen falling down the stairs. Bailey rushes to the house, when Charlie, Julia, Claudia, Grace and Sarah confront him. One by one, they all try to show Bailey that he has a serious drinking problem. Still in denial, Bailey refuses to accept it and fights with everybody. Joe arrives later that day and tells Bailey and everyone else that his late father, Nick Salinger, also had a serious drinking problem for many years, but he stayed sober for 18 years until he died. Bailey does not believe Joe, but Charlie does and proves it to be true with stories from his childhood. They all try to get Bailey into an AA program, but he refuses claiming that alcoholism is a part of who he is, and he openly states he would rather die than seek treatment. After everybody has given up, Claudia tells Bailey that if he does not face his drinking problem and look for help to stop his self-destructive lifestyle, than he will no longer be a part of the family. Bailey leaves without saying a word. In 2009, TV Guide ranked this episode #92 on its list of the 100 Greatest Episodes.
65	21	"Hitting Bottom"	Dennie Gordon	P.K. Simonds	February 26, 1997	13.32
Bailey is alone, and the Salingers' strategy to not speak to him does not seem to be working. Bailey actually increases his drinking and vandalizes his father's gravestone, blaming his dead father for giving him this "disease." After contemplating suicide, Bailey decides to drink himself to death. As a result, Bailey continues to alienate other people in his life with his constant drunkenness, first by angering Coach Petrocelli by missing an important wrestling match and later Callie by wanting to use her for sex. The drunken Bailey even puts three-year-old Owen in danger by kidnapping him from day care and keeping him out all day. Meanwhile, Claudia goes to Avery searching for answers for questions about her father. Like Bailey, Claudia too blames their late father for Bailey's drinking problem. Elsewhere, Griffin Holbrook returns with a minor leg injury from a boating accident in the Merchant Marines, and Julia encourages him to sue so he can be financially stable for a while he looks for steady work. Later that night, Bailey gets into a car accident while driving his jeep with Sarah, who gets seriously injured. After trying to drink himself to death by drinking several whiskey bottles, Bailey passes out, but later wakes up and upon seeing that he's not dead, goes to Sarah's hospital bed and asks for her help.
66	22	"Leap of Faith"	Susannah Grant	Lisa Melamed	March 5, 1997	11.91
As Sarah begins to recover from Bailey's car accident that has left her face physically scarred, he starts to go to AA meetings. At Bailey's first meeting, he bumps into Walter Alcott, the man that killed his parents. Bailey has second thoughts about going to the meetings, and he quits. Meanwhile, Griffin gets $100,000 from his lawsuit settlement and decides to help his estranged father. Julia realizes that Major Holbrook is friendly with Griffin just for the money. Elsewhere, Grace decides to run for city council and makes the Salingers's house her campaign headquarters.
67	23	"Promises, Promises"	Lou Antonio	Mark B. Perry	March 19, 1997	11.84
Bailey is sober for a week. Callie gets jealous because Bailey is spending much more time with Sarah--who meets a guy at her doctor's office and they hit it off--than with her. Callie tries to help Bailey, but he tells her that she's part of the reason for his drinking. Callie goes to Sarah and tries to find out why Sarah is helping Bailey so much. In response, Sarah tells Callie that she does not want to get back with Bailey because she's dating someone new. Callie gets drunk and insults Bailey. The next day, Bailey moves out of Callie's apartment and back to the Salinger house. Meanwhile, Julia starts skipping school in order to hang out with rebel Griffin, and she starts to get an 'F' in history. Griffin tells her to go back to school, and she does. Also, Claudia is rightfully convinced that Grace is too self-absorbed with running for city council and does not care about her and Owen, so she makes up a story about a reporter wanting to meet her just to spend some time with Grace. When the ruse is revealed, Charlie gets somewhat angry with Claudia that she led Grace on, but Claudia points out that she proved that Grace is more concerned about the reporter and the publicity from the family. Note: This marks Alexondra Lee's final appearance in the series.
68	24	"A Little Faith"	Ken Topolsky	Christopher Keyser & Amy Lippman & Chris Levinson	March 26, 1997	10.65
Claudia is invited to play the violin at a concert in Los Angeles, and nobody can take her there but Bailey. They go and Claudia kicks him out of the rehearsals because he is distracting her. In the hotel room, Bailey has nothing to do... and he really wants to drink. He calls Sarah, but she is not home. He calls Charlie, but he is not at the restaurant or at home. He drinks his entire hotel room's mini-bar and forgets to pick up Claudia. Joe shows up and finds a drunk Bailey. He and his wife pick up Claudia, who is very disappointed at Bailey. Afterwards, Joe has a serious talk with Bailey, where once again Bailey tries to pass the blame for all this on his dead father as well as the fact that Nick Salinger never told his children or anyone else about his drinking problem since alcoholism is hereditary. Joe responds that even if Bailey did inherit his father's alcoholism, he also inherited the will to stop drinking. On the way back home, Bailey and Claudia pass by an AA meeting at a local church, and Claudia tells Bailey to go and he does. Back in San Francisco, Grace is really sick, and she may be pregnant. After taking a pregnancy test, she finds out she is not, which makes her thrilled. Charlie is sad, and when they talk, Grace tells him that she does not want to have children. Also, Julia decides to travel with Griffin on a road trip through Nevada, but the motorcycle breaks down and they have to get back to San Francisco to get it fixed. Griffin decides to buy the repair shop.
69	25	"You Win Some, You Lose Some"	Michael Engler	Christopher Keyser & Amy Lippman	April 2, 1997	12.24
Bailey begins to show signs of recovery as he makes peace with Coach Petrocelli and other people that he let down during his drinking binges. At the same time, Sarah dumped her boyfriend. Her mother tells Bailey that she got into Brown University (Sarah's disapproving parents are trying to keep her away from Bailey). Bailey gets angry at her because she is moving away, but she decides to go to Berkeley instead. They kiss, but Sarah tells Bailey that she just wants to be friends with him. Meanwhile, Charlie and Grace break up because she reveals that she does not like children. Charlie, although telling Grace that he does love her, says that his parental responsibilities come first. Shortly afterwards, Grace wins the election for city council and after a victory party Charlie throws for her at the restaurant, she gladly moves out of the Salinger house and gives up all her responsibilities to the family. Justin is going to Europe for two months and ask Julia to go with him. She does not and marries Griffin in haste. At the end, Charlie, Bailey and Claudia give Julia their mother's wedding ring, and she moves out to travel in Europe.

=== Season 4 (1997–98) ===
No. overall	No. in season	Title	Directed by	Written by	Original release date	Prod. code	Viewers (millions)
70	1	"What a Drag"	Michael Engler	Mark B. Perry	September 17, 1997	160911	13.13
After spending all summer in Europe, Julia has trouble adjusting to married life as she settles in with Griffin. Meanwhile, Claudia wants to be popular during her first day of high school, so she tries out for the cheerleading squad, but ends up with the humiliating job of being the mascot. Sarah's vindictive father presses drunk driving charges against Bailey for the accident that put Sarah in the hospital after Bailey refuses to back off from being with her. Charlie finds Owen dressing up in drag and in talking about it to Owen's pre-school teacher, Jenny, and finds himself drawn to her. Note: This is Jeremy London's first episode credited as a series regular.
71	2	"Past Imperfect"	Ken Topolsky	P.K. Simonds	September 24, 1997	160912	10.91
Griffin is annoyed when his sexist Merchant Marine friend, Schuyler (guest star Michael Cudlitz) pays a visit and becomes a burden on both Griffin and Julia. Claudia gets busted while snooping inside the locker of Reed Isley, a football player whose affections she is trying to win. Meanwhile, Charlie is bothered by the rumors about child abuse involving Jenny, so he decides to not let Owen go back to pre-school. Bailey prepares for his trial for drunk driving, while Sarah decides to lie on the witness stand to protect him. Eventually, Bailey decides to accept a plea deal of having a three-year suspended sentence and having his driver's license revoked for one year that the district attorney offers despite the protests of Sarah's parents. Sarah’s parents don’t feel bad what they did to Bailey. Sarah decides to move out and stay with the Salingers until she finds her own place.
72	3	"Handicaps"	Lou Antonio	Christopher Keyser & Amy Lippman	October 1, 1997	160913	10.68
Griffin begins having financial problems at the garage but keeps them to himself to avoid troubling Julia. Meanwhile, Bailey and Sarah decide to move in together, believing they will resolve their problems after she is cut off by her parents and he becomes blacklisted by the employment market due to his court plea bargain. Claudia becomes more worried about being a standout in school. All of Charlie's dates turn out to be a disaster.
73	4	"Zap"	Eric Jewett	Mitchell Burgess & Robin Green	October 15, 1997	160914	10.52
Julia gets a new job as a museum curator and her new boss, Daniel (guest star Peter Krause), misreads her intentions and kisses her. He tells her she does not appear like a married woman. Meanwhile, Owen finds Charlie the perfect woman, Nina, who works as a zookeeper. Bailey and Sarah settle down as platonic roommates and building managers in their new apartment. They almost immediately get complaints from an irate tenant named Annie, a recently divorced single mother who's discovered to also be a recovering alcoholic after Bailey runs into her at an AA meeting. Claudia continues to try to get Reed's attention.
74	5	"Fight or Flight"	Patrick Norris	Julia Dahl	October 22, 1997	160915	10.78
Charlie and Nina's relationship gets slowed down when they realize they have different looks at the world. Meanwhile, Bailey and Annie start bonding and talking about their addictions while Sarah feels alone and left out. Griffin realizes that something is wrong with Julia, and after following her to her place of work, finds Daniel flirting with her. Charlie sulks about the restaurant being closed down for repairs.
75	6	"Immediate Family"	Daniel Attias	Mark B. Perry	October 29, 1997	160916	12.07
Following Julia's advice, Griffin tries to bond with Charlie by helping out for the restaurant's grand re-opening. Charlie confesses to Nina that he loves her. Meanwhile, Bailey and Annie quit their short relationship over both of their AA sponsors advice not to get involved due to their fragile states. Charlie faces Kirsten, who returns to town and causes tension with Nina. Elsewhere, Claudia gets Reed a job at Griffin's garage, but he continues to remain oblivious to her crush on him.
76	7	"Positive Attitude"	Michael Engler	P.K. Simonds	November 5, 1997	160917	13.66
The family prepares to throw Julia and Griffin a wedding party. Griffin continues to keep the truth about his financial problems from Julia and decides to borrow a lot of money from a "business associate" named Howie. Charlie collapses on a racquetball court, and he is diagnosed with having lymphoma. Charlie does not tell anyone, but he later tells everything to Kirsten. Charlie also meets Kirsten's new husband, Paul Thomas, a resident intern at the hospital where Kirsten also works. Meanwhile, Sarah is convinced that now is the right time for her to lose her virginity with her boyfriend Elliot, but her plan fails. Due to her decision, Bailey ends up in bed with Annie.
77	8	"Sickness/Health, Richer/Poorer"	Rodman Flender	Christopher Keyser & Amy Lippman	November 12, 1997	160918	13.30
Julia finally finds out about Griffin's financial problems before they renew their wedding vows. Nina can not face the fact that Charlie is sick, which leads to him breaking up with her. Meanwhile, Bailey brings Annie and her seven-year-old daughter, Natalie, to the wedding, but his choice to bring Natalie causes a big disaster.
78	9	"Truth Be Told"	Steve Robman	Christopher Keyser & Amy Lippman	November 19, 1997	160919	12.78
Now that she knows the truth about their financial problems, Julia starts working on resolving the problem with Griffin after they are evicted from their apartment and move in the shed next to the Salinger house. Meanwhile, Charlie's relatives struggle to deal with the fact that Charlie is sick. Each one deals with the news in their own way with Claudia's worry, Bailey's insecurity and Julia's indifference, which leads Charlie to turn to Kirsten for emotional support.
79	10	"Adjustments"	Vicki Jackson LeMay	Mitchell Burgess & Robin Green	December 3, 1997	160920	12.44
Sarah convinces Julia that she needs to find a real job for herself, but Julia's new job as an office intern does almost nothing to help her and Griffin's financial woes. After her car is towed for being parked illegally, Julia has to use her weekly paycheck to get the car released. Meanwhile, the prideful Charlie would not accept the help that his family is offering him after he begins radiation treatment. Bailey misunderstands Sarah's frustrations towards Annie as she struggles to find a new job. Claudia is furious to find out that Julia and Griffin fired Reed to get out of their financial problems.
80	11	"S'Wunnerful Life"	Jan Eliasberg	Mark B. Perry	December 10, 1997	160921	11.55
Sarah and Bailey host a Christmas party at their apartment, while Charlie decides to go on a long distance road trip with Kirsten. Meanwhile, Will pays Bailey a visit and realizes that he and Bailey are living in totally different worlds. Elsewhere, Justin shows up for a visit, and Julia paints a nice picture inspired by him.
81	12	"Empty Shoes"	Arvin Brown	P.K. Simonds	January 7, 1998	160922	11.43
Charlie asks for help at home and the restaurant after he realizes he is unable to function due to radiation therapy. Bailey realizes he needs to fire Julia from the restaurant because she is a terrible waitress and lousy homemaker. Claudia realizes that Reed does not have the same romantic feelings that she does for him. Sarah decides to build a miniature theater set as a college project with a little help from Charlie.
82	13	"Parent Trap"	Kevin Inch	Tammy Ader	January 14, 1998	160923	12.03
Tired of hiding their romantic relationship to Natalie, Bailey and Annie decide to tell her the truth, but she does not take it too well. Meanwhile, Reed finally tells Claudia the hard truth to convince her that he is not her boyfriend and that he is not interested in her. Julia and Griffin's relationship worsens over their separate work schedules and Griffin's continuing bad luck with running the garage. Prompted by an unexpected persistent rash brought by radiation side effects, Charlie decides to try out a new herbal medicine supplied by Kirsten. Guest stars Lauren Dahl, Tamara Braun.
83	14	"Of Human Bonding"	Brian Mertes	Julia Dahl & Mitchell Burgess & Robin Green	January 21, 1998	160924	11.91
Charlie meets a fellow cancer patient named Kevin, who inspires Charlie to live life to the fullest, and he changes his behavior. Julia spends time with Jeanie, a woman she works with, and they talk about their troubled marriages. Meanwhile, Bailey wants to bond with Annie's daughter, Natalie, despite the fact that the youngster wants nothing to do with him. Sarah has problems with her boyfriend Elliot, who may be losing interest in her. At the end, Julia is surprised when she finds out that Jeanie left her husband.
84	15	"Here and Now"	Daniel Attias	Mark B. Perry	January 28, 1998	160925	11.55
Charlie finds out his friend Kevin is in complete remission and is convinced that his cancer recovery made his chances to recover smaller. Meanwhile, Julia and Griffin finally realize they are investing money in a failed business after they scrap together money to produce a TV commercial for the garage which falls flat. Sarah is convinced that she'll die as a virgin, until Elliot comes out of the closet to Bailey. Claudia is hard-pressed to complete a school assignment on a time capsule that requires her to look to the future.
85	16	"I Give Up"	Ken Topolsky	P.K. Simonds	February 4, 1998	160926	11.30
Griffin is selling the shop and the only one interested in buying it is his business opponent. He has no choice and sells it. He and Julia are now debt free. The new owner, Rosalie, offers him a job at the store, which he refuses to take until Julia convinces him to. Meanwhile, Charlie has pneumonia and is back to the hospital. He gets better, but is too depressed to feel good. Everybody worries about him, including Kirsten. He decides to make a will just in case. Bailey, overwhelmed by responsibilities of managing the restaurant and going to school, decides to drop out of college so he can deal with everything. Paul tells Kirsten that he suspects that she's still in love with Charlie. Elsewhere, Claudia begins skipping school over being ignored by her siblings and because of Charlie's medical condition.
86	17	"Of Sound Mind and Body"	Steve Robman	Lisa Melamed	February 11, 1998	160927	11.83
Still in the hospital, Charlie asks Kirsten if he can leave Claudia and Owen to her if he dies. She wants to raise them, but Paul does not like children so much. Meanwhile, Claudia has been missing school for several weeks, and the school calls for a meeting. Bailey and Julia are so busy that they do not show up. As a result, Social Services are called and they pick up Claudia and Owen after they find both of them alone and unsupervised at the house. Claudia tells them that she and Owen are being neglected, and Julia and Bailey do the best they can to get them back. Everybody is mad at Claudia for skipping school and soon after, Charlie, Bailey and Julia naturally begin to blame each other instead of blaming themselves for the predicament they are in. Julia and Griffin go to Social Services and offer to take care of Claudia and Owen and manage to get them released. Claudia confides in Julia about being very depressed and lonely. Elsewhere, Rosalie continues to flirt with Griffin, and kisses him.
87	18	"True or False"	Lou Antonio	Ellen Herman	February 25, 1998	160928	10.38
Claudia gets help from a psychologist, which leads her to ask Charlie to spend more time with her and he decides to teach her how to drive a car so she can get a learner's permit. Meanwhile, Griffin discovers that he cannot fight with his growing attraction to Rosalie anymore. Julia rediscovers the academic world in a college literature class that she takes. Elsewhere, Bailey discovers that Annie has fallen off the wagon after he finds her drunk on the second anniversary of her sobriety.
88	19	"Go Away"	Jan Elisaberg	Christopher Keyser & Amy Lippman	March 4, 1998	160929	11.82
Julia, Bailey and Charlie leave town to drive up to their family cabin up in the Sierras to relax while Charlie waits for the results of his latest medical test. The getaway gives Bailey an opportunity to escape Annie's overwhelming neediness for him, and for Julia to seek a way to forget about Griffin's suspected infidelity. Back in San Francisco, Kirsten and Paul look after Claudia and Owen. Claudia is convinced that no one really cares about her anymore and sends off some out-of-state school applications. After arriving back, Julia talks to Griffin about Rosalie. After a fight with Julia, Griffin turns to Rosalie for comfort and they finally sleep together. Bailey finds out Annie was forced to go into a rehab clinic after Sarah finds her passed out in her apartment.
89	20	"Square One (1)"	Daniel Attias	P.K. Simonds	April 22, 1998	160930	10.22
Charlie decides to throw a party to celebrate his cancer being in remission, but everyone has something else to do on the date he wants to throw the party. He meets Daphne, a stripper, who makes him realize his life should change now that he is out of danger. Meanwhile, Julia wants to start her marriage over with Griffin. He feels so guilty about his fling with Rosalie that he quits his job at the garage and finally confesses to Julia about his infidelity. Bailey and Sarah both go crazy babysitting Natalie while Annie is in rehab. To be continued...
90	21	"Free and Clear (2)"	Steve Robman	Robin Green & Mitchell Burgess	April 22, 1998	160931	10.22
Sarah and Bailey continue to take care of Annie's daughter, and Sarah realizes she still has feelings for him. Bailey finally gets his driver's license reinstated and also feels the same romantic feelings for Sarah. Meanwhile, Julia and Griffin go to a marriage counselor after Julia announces that she has decided to enroll in college. Joe decides to sell the restaurant, so the family buys it, because Bailey is ready to manage it. Elsewhere, a visiting prep school student rep named Jamie Burke makes a play for Claudia, until she learns that his parents have had a long-term rivalry with her late parents.
91	22	"Opposites Distract"	Julianna Levin	Lisa Melamed	April 29, 1998	160932	10.47
Julia expects help from Justin to solve her marriage, but it all turns out differently. As he's done before in the past (in Season 2), Justin tries to convince Julia that Griffin is a loser after he gets into a bar fight over frustration about his marital troubles. Meanwhile, Sarah wants to make peace between Annie and Bailey, so she finally decides to get them together to resolve their problems. Charlie enrolls himself to appear in a stage production in Daphne's musical. Jamie expresses a strong interest in Claudia despite her lack of interest towards him.
92	23	"Fools Rush In"	Michael Engler	Story by : Christopher Keyser & Amy Lippman; Teleplay by : P.K. Simonds	May 6, 1998	160933	10.74
In a rare stroke of good luck, Griffin wins a free weekend trip to Los Angeles when he turns out to be the 1,000th customer at the local supermarket. He and Julia get closer and their relationship seems to be filled with love again; but it turns out to be short-lived. Meanwhile, Charlie is bothered by Daphne's stripping profession and that makes some trouble in their new-found romance. The real shock comes when she admits to being pregnant from their first sexual encounter. Bailey has deep misgivings about moving in with Annie when she gets an unexpected visit from her ex-husband, Jay (guest star John Slattery), seeking to get back together with her and their daughter. Claudia is finally happy when Jamie asks her to go to his prom.
93	24	"Fools Rush Out"	Michael Engler	Story by : Christopher Keyser & Amy Lippman; Teleplay by : P.K. Simonds	May 13, 1998	160934	11.50
In the fourth season finale, Sarah confesses to Bailey that she still loves him. Bailey decides to let go of Annie so she and her daughter can get back together with her ex-husband. After Annie moves out of her apartment, Sarah and Bailey get back together and they make love. Meanwhile, Julia gets accepted into college at Stanford, making Griffin feel like he is holding her back from her college life. Charlie tells Daphne he will take full responsibility as the father of her baby if he has to. Jamie takes Claudia to his school prom, where they end up dancing on the baseball field by themselves.

=== Season 5 (1998–99) ===
No. overall	No. in season	Title	Directed by	Written by	Original release date	Viewers (millions)
94	1	"Moving On"	Ken Topolsky	P.K. Simonds	September 16, 1998	11.92
Julia packs her bags and leaves Griffin to go to Stanford, while Bailey has to leave to help move Claudia to Massachusetts for boarding school. Meanwhile, Charlie drives Daphne crazy with his overprotectiveness. Having gotten back together, Sarah and Bailey move into a new loft apartment. After many arguments, Daphne decides to move out of the house and leave Charlie. Note: Paula Devicq is credited again as a series regular after recurring for the past two and a half seasons. She'll stay credited as a series regular through the next and final season of the show.
95	2	"Separation Anxiety"	Daniel Attias	Tammy Ader	September 23, 1998	10.51
Sarah learns that her parents have separated. Meanwhile, Claudia feels like a nerd at her new school, but as time passes she realizes that being smart is not a bad thing after all. Charlie goes to a lawyer to ask about parental rights, and Daphne returns to the Salinger house when her new living situation becomes unbearable. After being told he has little chance of custody while unemployed, Charlie takes a new job as a high school shop teacher. During her first week at Stanford, Julia realizes she has feelings for Josh, which makes her roommate's boyfriend, Ned, jealous.
96	3	"Naming Names"	Steve Robman	Christopher Keyser & Amy Lippman	September 30, 1998	10.44
Julia and Griffin both lie to each other about their current dating situations. Julia tries interacting with Josh while Griffin moves back to the Salingers' shed as he looks for a new place to live. Meanwhile, Charlie is very happy to find out that he is going to have a baby girl, but Daphne did not want to know the sex and is upset when it is blurted out in front of her. Sarah is shocked to find out that her biological mother has died in a plane crash. Elsewhere, Claudia tries to lead a normal, perfect life at her new school and has little interest in rebelling with her new friends.
97	4	"A Mid-Semester's Night Dream"	Adam Nimoy	Julia Dahl	October 28, 1998	10.39
Charlie and Daphne make peace with each other, and Daphne admits to him that she is scared about having a baby. Meanwhile, Julia tries to stay away from Ned after their recent kiss, but she ends up in his arms after a dorm Halloween party. Sarah suspects something's up with Will when he begins to act strangely. She and Bailey then discover that Will is running away from college after impregnating his classmate Hannah. In Massachusetts, Claudia's former boyfriend, Jamie Burke, arrives at her school for a visit, but she wants to leave him in the past in order to fit in more with her new friends.
98	5	"The Baby"	Daniel Attias	Christopher Keyser & Amy Lippman	November 4, 1998	11.06
Daphne collapses and is taken to the hospital. She and Charlie are forced to decide between a premature birth or Daphne dying from liver failure. Maggie catches Ned and Julia together. Griffin meets Ned at the hospital. Meanwhile, Sarah and Bailey kick out Will and instead let Hannah stay with them. Sarah is shocked when Bailey gives Hannah money for an abortion.
99	6	"Forgive and/or Forget"	Steve Robman	P.K. Simonds	November 11, 1998	10.82
Owen is dissatisfied when all the attention goes to Daphne and Charlie's new baby, Diana. Daphne is worried about how will she do with the baby, and she suspects that everything will go wrong. Claudia comforts Owen. Bailey moves out of Sarah's apartment when he feels that the strong line of love between them broke. Julia is worried about the consequences of her relationship with Ned, but they make love.
100	7	"Tender Age"	Ken Topolsky	John Romano	November 18, 1998	11.68
Thanksgiving Day at the Salingers' is anything but peaceful. Owen runs away from Charlie in the mall, and the family must look for him. Julia invites Ned to the house for Thanksgiving Day. In Massachusetts, Claudia tries to reach out to her family, but Daphne keeps on dodging her phone calls until Claudia starts to be worried. Bailey and Sarah talk about their relationship.
101	8	"Love and War"	Vicki Jackson LeMay	Allan Heinberg	December 2, 1998	10.62
Charlie has a hard time trying to be there for both Owen and Diana and gets little sleep. Bailey fights with the opening of a new restaurant that begins taking away the business from Salingers. Julia finds out just how bad Ned's relationship with his parents is, and that he has an autistic brother named Richie. Meanwhile, Claudia wants to go home immediately thus dropping out of school, but there is no one to help.
102	9	"Gifts"	Joe Ann Fogle	Julia Dahl & Tammy Ader	December 9, 1998	10.01
After finding out more about Ned's relationship with his abusive parents and his autistic brother Richie, Julia wants to get closer to Richie. Meanwhile, Griffin goes to Boston on a job task and finds Claudia there, where she asks him to take her back to California. Charlie realizes that Daphne is not really bonding with their daughter.
103	10	"One Christmas to Go"	Ken Topolsky	P.K. Simonds	December 16, 1998	9.73
At Christmas time, Ned does his best to keep Julia to himself during the holidays. Meanwhile, Daphne's irresponsible mother (guest star Karen Black) visits and Daphne begins to realize just how much she is like her mother – and that is why she has hard time taking care of her baby. Owen has a little fun of his own – stealing – and Bailey is there to teach him not to. Claudia wants to just have a normal Christmas with her family.
104	11	"Rings of Saturn"	Lou Antonio	Mark Richard	January 13, 1999	11.29
When Charlie can not take care of Owen, Bailey takes him on a camping trip and it turns out to be a total disaster. Meanwhile, Kirsten and Paul talk about adopting a baby after Kirsten accepts a volunteer position in a hospital. Daphne is still having hard time trying to take care of baby Diana. She goes to church after 15 years of absence and it makes her think about her life. Ned finds out that Maggie has a new boyfriend. He convinces Julia to move into his room, but Maggie changes her mind. When Ned realizes it, he hits Julia.
105	12	"Witness for the Persecution"	Ellen S. Pressman	John Romano & Allan Heinberg	January 20, 1999	10.27
Julia is still shocked by Ned's violent behavior, and she would not talk to anyone about it. Meanwhile, Griffin tries to get Claudia to join his band and play the violin, but he forgets to get the approval of his other band members. Charlie has a hard time trying to cope with the fact that Daphne left. Bailey and Sarah go to a restaurant, where a robber attacks them and steals some money and Sarah's necklace. Sarah is afraid that the robber will return, so she's in constant fear. Julia decides to talk to Ned, but finds just how possessive he really is.
106	13	"Fillmore Street"	Eric Jewett	Julia Dahl	January 27, 1999	10.46
Griffin realizes that something bad happened between Julia and Ned. He tries to help, but it leads to nowhere since she will not talk with him about what is going on. Meanwhile, Charlie becomes a chick-magnet now that he is a single father but does not realize it. Claudia tries to put the members of the band back together, so she tries to become friends with Cody, the guitarist. Kirsten feels that she's ready to adopt a baby, but Paul is reckless. Sarah tries to become friends with Albert, the guy that mugged her.
107	14	"Stand by Me"	Jonathan Prince	Tammy Ader	February 3, 1999	9.89
Griffin still feels that something is wrong in Julia and Ned's relationship, so he contacts Justin to help Julia before it is too late. Meanwhile, Charlie decides to find Daphne after reading her file. Kirsten and Paul decide to get separated. Ned convinces Justin that there's nothing wrong in his and Julia's relationship. Sarah trusts Albert and brings him to her apartment. When she's absent, Albert predictably betrays Sarah's trust by stealing Sarah's keys and Bailey's gun, which leads to a total disaster in the building when Albert robs a tenant. Cody and Claudia get close.
108	15	"Whatever Works"	Daniel Attias	P.K. Simonds	February 10, 1999	10.27
Now even more determined to find Daphne, Charlie leaves for Los Angeles. Meanwhile, a troubled Julia convinces everyone that everything is all right in her relationship with the abusive Ned, and it leads Griffin to madness. He refuses to sign the divorce papers and ends up beating Ned up. Ned is rushed to the hospital, while Griffin gets arrested. Bailey has to choose between his family life with Owen and a new amazing business offer. Cody steals a gift for Valentine's day and gives it Claudia, who knows about it.
109	16	"Party of Freud"	Steve Robman	Christopher Keyser & Amy Lippman	February 17, 1999	9.85
Now that he turned down the business offer, Bailey gets closer to Owen and is surprised to find out that he may have a learning disability. In L.A., Charlie convinces Daphne to return to San Francisco, but she backs out at the last moment, thinking she is not ready. Charlie kicks Griffin out of the shed for beating up Ned and refuses to believe Griffin's claims that Ned is abusing Julia. At the same time, Julia tries to make Ned get some help, but it backfires heavily. After leaving Paul, Kirsten goes back to Chicago to visit her parents.
110	17	"fam-i-ly"	Lou Antonio	Julia Dahl	March 3, 1999	9.89
Maggie confesses to the Salingers that Ned hit Julia because he used to physically hit her too when they were together. They all try to get Julia to break up with him, but she refuses. Charlie and Bailey fight over Owen's custody. Meanwhile, Sarah finds out that her mother is getting remarried. Claudia announces that she will go to Stanford to confront Julia about her relationship with Ned.
111	18	"Driven to Extremes"	Joe Pennella	Mark Richard & Allan Heinberg	March 10, 1999	10.34
The battle between Charlie and Bailey for Owen's custody continues, and it drives everyone else crazy. Meanwhile, Owen's learning disability grows. Maggie and Julia leave class to go to the museum. Griffin kidnaps Julia to convince her that Ned is dangerous while Ned searches for her. Maggie confesses to him that she's not with her. Julia finally leaves Ned.
112	19	"Judgment Day"	Ellen S. Pressman	John Romano & P.K. Simonds	March 17, 1999	10.12
The fight between Charlie and Bailey for the custody of Owen continues. They go to a judge. After Julia leaves Ned, he starts to stalk her by following her everywhere. The whole family goes to court, and Charlie is awarded sole custody of Owen. Charlie has a change of heart and lets Owen live with Bailey.
113	20	"The Wish"	Adam Nimoy	Dan Peterson	April 14, 1999	9.62
Claudia is preparing to celebrate her 16th birthday and her only wish is that the whole family gets back together. Meanwhile, Julia and Griffin are trapped in an elevator in a blackout. They reunite. Paul talks to Charlie about Kirsten and tells him that she belongs to him. Sarah talks to Claudia about men. At the end, Claudia's birthday wish comes true.
114	21	"Get Back"	Steve Robman	Tammy Ader	April 21, 1999	8.30
Julia and Griffin are finally back together. Julia meets Claudia at school and tells her the happy news. Meanwhile, Bailey realizes that Owen is losing his heritage by living away from the Salinger house. Claudia realizes that she has a crush on Griffin. Claudia talks to Charlie about Kirsten and him getting back together with her. Charlie enrolls Kirsten in an overseas program, but changes his mind when he finds out that she'll be gone for two years. Griffin decides to not get back together with Julia, and he finally decides to sign their divorce papers.
115	22	"Fragile"	Harry Winer	Mimi Schmir	April 28, 1999	9.61
Charlie and Kirsten's relationship grows as he moves into her apartment. Sarah and Bailey move back to the Salinger house. Julia gets close to a visiting female English professor named Perry Marks (guest star Olivia d'Abo). Bailey tries to stay faithful to Sarah when he's around Lauren all the time. Claudia and Cody go on a date to a concert and find out more about each other.
116	23	"I'll Show You Mine"	Daniel Attias	Julia Dahl	May 5, 1999	9.45
Claudia tries to slow down her new relationship with Cody. She's too afraid about moving way too fast, thinking that it will lead to sex, which she feels is not ready for. Meanwhile, Julia moves closer to her writing professor, Perry, and ends up kissing her, but she is the one that does not want to be played. Sarah and Bailey move even more away from each other. Charlie tries to talk to Kirsten, but learns that the easy way is not the way he has to go with Kirsten.
117	24	"Haunted"	Jan Eliasberg	John Romano & Allan Heinberg	May 12, 1999	9.15
Julia spends all her time dating Josh and after a talk with Perry, she realizes just how much she needs some time alone. Meanwhile, Daphne finally shows up in San Francisco. Kirsten feels threatened by her, while Charlie tries to explain Daphne that he's with Kirsten now. Sarah has a hard time trying to figure out just what is she wants to do with her life. Daphne tells Charlie that she's back in San Francisco to take Diana back. Bailey decides to solve the situation with Sarah by buying an engagement ring.
118	25	"Otherwise Engaged"	Daniel Attias	Mark Richard & P.K. Simonds	May 19, 1999	9.90
Bailey proposes to Sarah and she says 'yes', but changes her mind later, thinking that she is way too young to go into something this deep. Meanwhile, Charlie proposes to Kirsten and she accepts. Daphne has a hard time trying to fit into their new situation. Claudia tries to get closer to Cody and she's ready to drink with his friends in order to get more close to him. Justin wants to help Julia with her finals, but she seems to be doing just fine on her own.

=== Season 6 (1999–2000) ===
No. overall	No. in season	Title	Directed by	Written by	Original release date	Viewers (millions)
119	1	"Don't Let Go"	Steve Robman	P.K. Simonds	October 5, 1999	8.52
Bailey tries to plan a perfect wedding for Charlie and Kirsten. But when his plans fail, he tells Charlie to plan his own wedding. Kirsten's parents, Gene and Ellie, come to town, but they are not supportive of the engagement because of Charlie and Kirsten's previously failed wedding in the past (from Season 2). Meanwhile, Claudia breaks up with Cody after she catches him cheating on her. Sarah confronts Bailey about his anger towards her after she called off their engagement. After an editor named Evan offers Julia a book deal, she transfers to a fine arts college and moves back home. Note: This is Jennifer Aspen's first episode credited as a series regular.
120	2	"Naked"	Daniel Attias	Julia Dahl	October 12, 1999	8.37
Charlie and Kirsten have a terrible honeymoon in Mexico when Charlie gets sunburned and Kirsten gets Montezuma's revenge, but when they start to experiment sexually, they end up having a great time. Back in San Francisco, Cody tries to win back Claudia, who turns him away. Bailey and Sarah are having communication problems, but are solving them by having sex. Joe visits and tells Bailey about his separation from his wife, Frannie. Julia has writer's block, but Evan refuses to help her out.
121	3	"Bye, Bye, Love"	Adam Nimoy	Allan Heinberg & Mimi Schmir	October 19, 1999	6.53
Daphne hires Victor as a nanny for Diana, and gets help job-hunting from Kirsten. Charlie counsels a troubled teen named Myra at work. Meanwhile, Julia investigates her parents' relationship for her written assignment, which upsets Bailey. Claudia figures out that Cameron is attacking his friends on a web page. Sarah thinks she's found her father in New York and plans to meet him, meaning that she will have to leave Bailey. Note: This marks Jennifer Love Hewitt's final appearance in the series. She will continue her quest to search for her biological father in the spinoff series Time of Your Life
122	4	"Wrestling Demons"	Lou Antonio	Melissa Rosenberg	October 26, 1999	7.29
Victor turns the house into a haunted one for Owen on Halloween. Julia realizes that she has feelings for Evan. Charlie and Kirsten explore having their own baby. Bailey finds out that Will is back in San Francisco and is chauffeuring wrestlers for a living after dropping out of college. Claudia sees that Cameron has feelings for her when he tells her about his decision to break up with Alexa. Note: Starting with this episode, Scott Grimes is credited again as a series regular for the rest of the show's sixth and final season after recurring for the past three seasons.
123	5	"The Shortest Distance"	Eric Jewett	Tom Garrigus & Ian Biederman	November 2, 1999	6.75
Kirsten and Charlie are having difficulty with the regimen associated with trying to get pregnant. His effort to pay for in-vitro fertilization leads him to take a second job, and he no longer has time to tutor Myra. Claudia helps tutor Myra and receives some helpful advice from her about her situation with Cameron and Alexa. Bailey decides to pay Sarah a visit in New York with Griffin and Will, but does not get very far. Evan and Julia finally sleep together. Daphne lies to Charlie about finding a new job.
124	6	"Too Close"	Daniel Attias	Julia Dahl & P.K. Simonds	November 9, 1999	6.29
Bailey goes to a bar and almost drinks, but meets a woman named Tracy, who turns out to be married. Griffin sees Daphne working at a strip club. Bailey invites Will to move in with him. Meanwhile, Myra keeps turning to Charlie for help, but when he reports her to her principal, Myra's mother claims that he was involved with her sexually. Julia wants to make her and Evan's relationship public, but he becomes very hesitant. Claudia finds out that Cameron got back together with Alexa. She tries her luck with a football player, named Derek, but when he gets her alone, he would not take no for an answer and almost rapes her.
125	7	"We Gather Together"	Steve Robman	Allan Heinberg	November 16, 1999	6.36
Charlie convinces Myra's mother to drop statutory rape charges against him. Claudia decides to not report Derek's attack in order to deal with it. Daphne and Griffin get drunk and end up together. Kirsten learns that she is pregnant. Bailey continues seeing Tracy, while Julia gets closer to Evan and his son, Brian.
126	8	"Faith, Hope and Charity"	Daniel Attias	Melissa Rosenberg & Christopher Keyser & Amy Lippman & Mimi Schmir	November 30, 1999	6.44
Julia decides to break up with Evan after she discovers his emotional unavailability. Claudia gets drunk at Grant High School's homecoming dance when no one reacts to Derek's problems. Meanwhile, Charlie considers leaving his counseling job and working at the furniture factory. Bailey spends time dating a lot of girls and gets interested in Holly, an attractive English immigrant and medical intern. Daphne and Griffin survive a terrible motorcycle accident, and the Salingers are ready to pay for his expensive hand surgery since he does not have insurance.
127	9	"Ties That Bind"	Lou Antonio	Mimi Schmir & Robin Schiff	December 7, 1999	5.62
Bailey continues dating Holly. They spend the night together and end up having sex. Griffin feels that he has a debt to the Salingers, since they paid for his expensive hand surgery. Meanwhile, Claudia tries to return to playing her violin, but gets upset when she finds out she's no longer the best among her classmates. Also, Charlie and Kirsten try to buy illegal hormones, but end up realizing they should get pregnant naturally.
128	10	"Dog Day After New Year"	Keith Samples	Julia Dahl & Tom Garrigus	January 11, 2000	5.94
Bailey goes to a wedding with Holly and all her relatives think they're married. Julia's new editor has not answered her about her book, so she tries to find her and not just sit and wait. When she finds her, she tells Julia that another book with the same story of hers has been published, so her book would not be published anymore. Thurber, the family bulldog, is sick. Claudia takes him to the veterinary. Charlie and Kirsten go on a double date with Daphne and her new boyfriend named Luke Sheppard. Charlie quits his job after his boss says 'no' to his projects, but when they talk, he gets his job back. Bailey and Claudia decide to put Thurber to sleep due to his old age and ill health, and the whole family spread his ashes in the park, saying goodbye for the last time to the long-time family pet.
129	11	"Fear and Loathing"	Joe Pennella	Ian Biederman	January 18, 2000	6.17
Julia accompanies Claudia on a trip to Yale University for a college tour and to visit Justin, where they meet his new girlfriend, Laura. At the same time, Claudia becomes acquainted with a fellow student named Peter, who is assigned to show her around the campus. Back in San Francisco, Victor steps in when Owen comes home every day claiming to be bullied at school. Meanwhile, Bailey questions himself on how casual he wants to be with Holly when they spend almost every day together, which changes when she tells that it is all too much for her. Charlie becomes wary about Luke in handling baby Diana, but learns that his parenting is not all perfect either since he has to make a deadline with his new furniture designs and be with Kirsten for a surgery.
130	12	"Bad Behavior"	Harry Winer	Melissa Rosenberg & Allan Heinberg	January 25, 2000	6.54
Julia becomes intrigued by a writer, named Adam Matthews, in her writing class with no apparent writer's block, but later discovers that Adam is pretending to be a college student uses writing to channel his personal feelings. Meanwhile, Owen's friend's father make disparaging remarks about Victor since he happens to be gay. While dating and sleeping with a number of different women in an attempt to purge his pain after breaking up with Holly, Bailey betrays Will's trust when he sleeps with Will's new girlfriend's sister. Charlie gives Daphne a job at the furniture factory as a consultant, while Kirsten has her own hands full with her busy schedule. Claudia reconnects with another school musician named Todd, who inspires her to go with her instincts when it comes to music. At the end, Bailey reaches into the kitchen refrigerator and drinks one of Charlie's beers.
131	13	"The Declaration of Co-Dependence"	Danny Leiner	Mimi Schmir	February 1, 2000	5.68
Bailey has a full plate to deal when he starts drinking again and then discovers money missing from the restaurant, learning that Joe is responsible. Charlie and his foreman, Gun, clash on cost cutting for the new furniture line. After some incidents with the workers, Gus decides to let Charlie run the business all by himself. Bailey's love life takes yet another turn when he meets a young woman, named Evvie, at an AA meeting who asks him to be her sponsor. Meanwhile, Adam takes Julia out for a time on the town, where she curbs his romantic ideas for her and he suspects that she does not like him. Daphne announces that she and her Army boyfriend, Luke, have decided to move back to Texas and she wants to take baby Diana with her.
132	14	"One for the Road"	Steve Robman	Ian Biederman & P.K. Simonds	February 8, 2000	5.62
Justin returns to San Francisco for his engagement party, where Julia tries to remain supportive of his coming marriage to Laura. But when Adam notes to Julia that Justin and Laura lack a link between them, Julia tries to tell Justin not to get married, which alienates both him and Laura. Meanwhile, Daphne objects to Charlie's control over her and baby Diana. But when Charlie realizes that he does not want to fight another ugly court battle and let Daphne be unhappy, he eventually tells her that she can leave town with their daughter and Luke. Bailey tells Evvie that they should start living up their lives by going to a party and drinking, where Bailey drinks in moderation and Evvie ends up collapsing from alcohol poisoning and is rushed to the hospital. Both Evvie's sponsor and Holly blames Bailey for this turn of events. Later at home, Julia and Claudia discover that Bailey's been drinking again and he storms out of the house and drives away, crashing into a pole.
133	15	"What If..."	Ken Topolsky	Allan Heinberg & P.K. Simonds	February 22, 2000	5.94
After a drunken Bailey crashes his jeep into a stoplight post, he blacks out and has a vision of an alternate reality of what life would be like if his parents never died in the car accident six years ago. In this alternate world, set during a weekend of planning Nick and Diana Salinger's 31st anniversary party, all of the siblings are insecure with their parents, whom they cannot stand up to. Bailey is revealed to be living with Will and both of them work as roadies for a heavy metal band after Bailey dropped out of college and never stopped drinking or grew up. Charlie appears better off having gone back to college, earning a Master's degree in architecture, and is a fairly wealthy man working in a prestigious company. But like Bailey, Charlie never met Kirsten or ever grew up. He has to deal with his pregnant girlfriend's abortion, where he meets Kirsten for the first time working as a medical consultant at an abortion clinic. Julia also never grew up and has been engaged to Justin for years, which changes when she meets Griffin for the first time and loses her virginity with him. Claudia, on the other hand, is a home-schooled violinist, having gone on various world tours in which she wants to quit her profession for a little rest. All of them, nevertheless, come together for their parents' anniversary party at Salinger's Restaurant. At the end, Bailey wakes up from his fantasy and decides to seek help for himself.
134	16	"Blast the Past"	Daniel Attias	P.K. Simonds & Melissa Rosenberg	March 14, 2000	4.63
After spending a few weeks in rehab, Bailey does not feel as good as he looks to others and is beside himself over his life troubles. Meanwhile, Claudia and Todd accompany Julia and Adam on a drive to Las Vegas when Justin decides to elope with Laura. Julia must decide on where she stands with Adam, while Todd does not know how to make his move on Claudia. Tensions between Charlie and Joe over managing the restaurant come to a head when Charlie states that he does not trust Joe because of the embezzlement incident. An unusually moody Kirsten thinks she's going through withdrawal since she quit taking her anti-depressant pills, only to get an even bigger surprise that will change her life and Charlie's.
135	17	"Getting There"	Joe Penella	Tom Garrigus	March 21, 2000	4.67
Unable to find his calling, Bailey becomes reacquainted with Holly, where he attempts to help her older sister, Fiona, find her calling as a costume designer. Meanwhile, Claudia gets the violin position Todd coveted, which leads to some competition for both of them. An order for a hotel chain may be more than Charlie can handle due to his lack of funds and manpower to build the chairs at the factory, while Kirsten deals with morning sickness during her first trimester of her pregnancy. Julia seeks to cure her writer's block with frequent sex trysts with Adam as their relationship heats up, which unwittingly creates writer's block for him.
136	18	"Too Cool for School"	Scott Brazil	Ian Biederman & Mimi Schmir	April 4, 2000	4.83
Charlie looks into buying the furniture factory when Gus decides to sell it to a major corporation. But Charlie learns more about owning it when he must come up with some collateral for a bank to give him a loan. Meanwhile, Bailey's lack of education and no college degree sets him back on his unchosen career, until he learns more about a college business education while accompanying Holly on her pre-med lectures. Julia begins to resent Adam when he challenges criticism from his writing instructor and he responds frustrated at himself and everything. Adam then breaks up with Julia and leaves town. Victor deals with his young son over his one-time tryst with a woman. Claudia privately celebrates her 17th birthday as she deals with a brief separation from Todd, who is going to New York for a violin concert.
137	19	"Isn't It Romantic"	Ken Topolsky	Allan Heinberg	April 11, 2000	5.40
Just as Bailey begins taking business college classes, Holly's student visa is revoked, which means that she must return to England. After considering every option, Bailey then asks Will to pretend to be married to Holly in order for her to get a green card. Meanwhile, a discontented Daphne returns to town with baby Diana. She reveals to Charlie and Kirsten about her difficulties and doubts about Luke, which Kirsten sees as a parallel to her own life with Charlie over his busy hours at the furniture factory. Despite Griffin's objections, Julia confronts her former boyfriend, Ned, after spotting him in town, which leads Julia to re-examine her own troubled life. Victor rejects Claudia's matchmaking for him and Ross.
138	20	"Great Expectations"	Christian D. Della Penna	Emily Whitesell	April 18, 2000	4.7
Will panics after a meeting with an INS agent asking about the authenticity of his and Holly's "marriage," while Bailey's discomfort grows after Will and Holly pretend to act intimate in public. Meanwhile, Adam arrives back in San Francisco and asks Julia to join him and his artist friends living at a camp in Mexico. Kirsten frets about her pregnancy and fear of losing her baby by miscarriage. Claudia lets the "love" word slip to Todd after telling him about a romantic dream about him. A factory foreman named Mitch opposes Charlie's assembly-line plan when production gets slowed down due to a shortage of labor.
139	21	"Taboo or Not Taboo"	Matthew Fox	Mimi Schmir & Melissa Rosenberg	April 19, 2000	5.9
Claudia is tempted by an academic shortcut of plagiarizing a term paper while trying to balance her time between school and seeing Todd. Meanwhile, Will's discomfort grows after he moves in with Holly to continue his and Bailey's charade about being married. Justin arrives back in town after having left his wife with ironic timing for Julia, who is giving an interview to Phoebe, a young writer researching Julia's life story. Kirsten goes out on the town with Daphne and her free-spirited friends, who inspire Kirsten not to be afraid to be spontaneous and take a chance in her life.
140	22	"Falling Forward"	David Dworetzky	Allan Heinberg & Tom Garrigus & Ian Biederman	April 26, 2000	6.07
Charlie and Bailey decide to increase production of the furniture assembly line sales when a big client offers a generous fee. But Charlie is forced to cut production after Mitch has an accident and is hospitalized for a heart condition. Meanwhile, Holly gets wind of Will's feelings and growing attraction to her, which leads her to think that Bailey's marriage plan was not a good idea after all. Holly leaves to go back to England, and Will tells Bailey that he has decided to return to college. A women's magazine offers Julia a column to write and a possible job opportunity while she rekindles and consummates her romance with Justin. With college decisions weighing on them, Claudia and Todd finally sleep together. Note: This is Scott Grimes' final appearance on the show as Will McCorkle.
141	23	"All's Well..."	Steve Robman	P.K. Simonds	May 3, 2000	6.49
(Part 1 of 2) Bailey considers moving to Philadelphia to go back to college by attending the University of Pennsylvania following Joe's advice, but has some complications when Owen does not want to go with him and Charlie tells Bailey about keeping their parental responsibilities. Meanwhile, Julia ponders a choice to moving to Washington, D.C. for an internship working for the National Organization for Women, and being away from Justin and the rest of the family. After Julia tells Justin about her new job opportunity, Justin decides to transfer to Georgetown University to be near Julia in D.C. Claudia ponders about accepting a scholarship to attend the Juilliard School of Music in New York City or staying near Todd in San Francisco. Ross persuades Claudia to take the scholarship and not pass up an opportunity like this. Todd hears about Claudia's scholarship offer and tells her that he too wants her to leave, even though he does love her and it might risk ending their romance. Daphne confides in Charlie about her problems with Luke, who wants a job in Texas and leaves no time for her to be with Diana. Charlie then decides to make Luke the new partner in his furniture factory to give him, Daphne, and Diana support after Bailey tells him about moving to Pennsylvania to go to college. Note: This is Jennifer Aspen's final appearance on the show as Daphne Jablonsky.
142	24	"...That Ends Well"	Ken Topolsky	Christopher Keyser & Amy Lippman	May 3, 2000	6.49
(Part 2 of 2) In the series finale, Bailey, Julia and Claudia all announce their plans to leave town during the weekly family dinner at Salinger's Restaurant. It starts a wave of arguments over one's priorities. Charlie has a surprising revelation of his own when he tells them that he has decided to sell the family house and split the money between them. After thinking about it, the rest of siblings agree and decide to move on and let go of their past for good. Griffin also decides that it is time for him to move out of the Salingers' shed and into a place of his own. Charlie and Kirsten, expecting their first child, move into a new house with Owen to start anew.
