= Samantha Wan =

Canadian actress, screenwriter, and producer

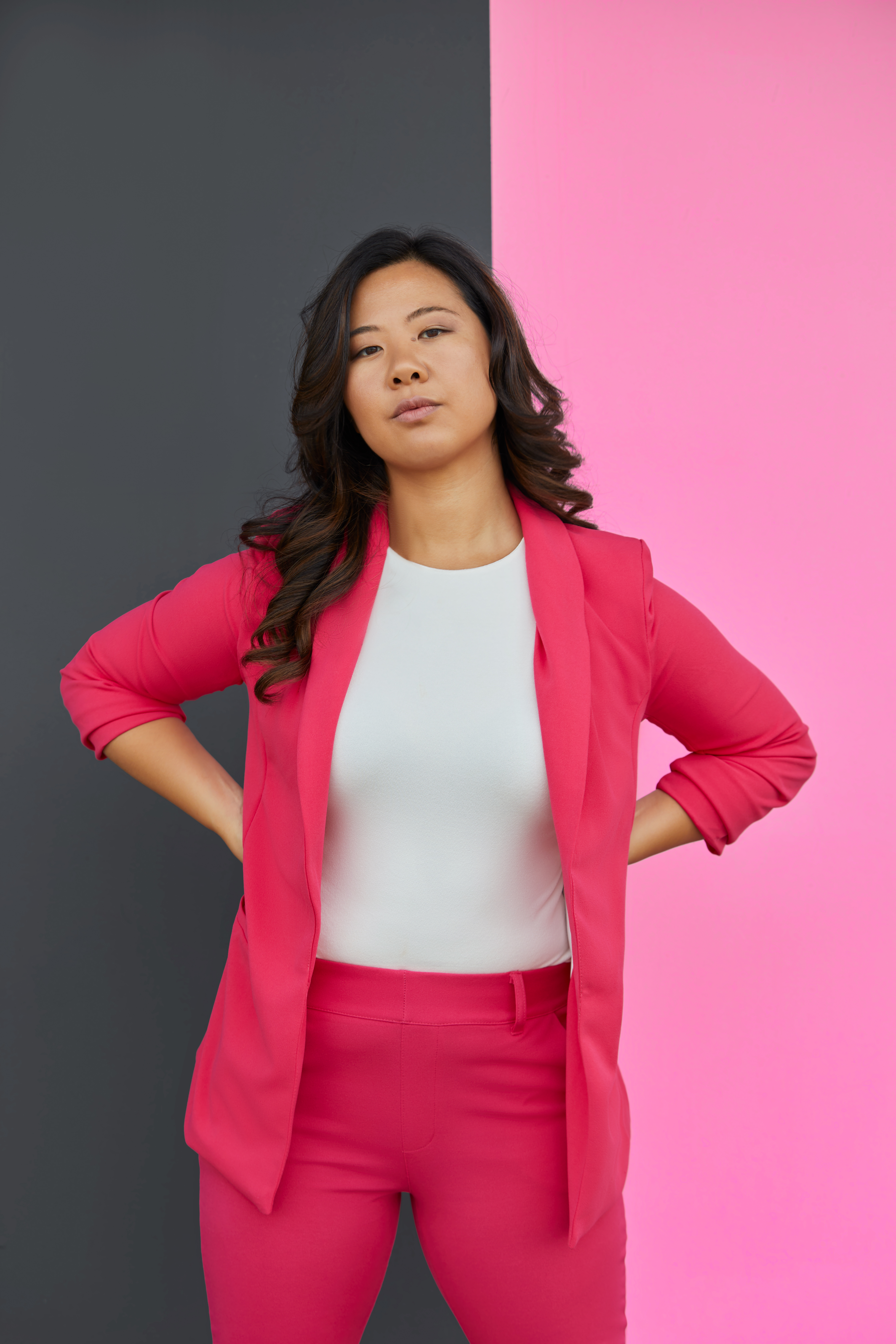
- Wan in 2023
- Occupations: Actress; film director; screenwriter; film producer; web series creator
- Years active: 2010–present
- Known for: Jen Wu on Second Jen; Zoe Chow in Private Eyes; Cathy Tan on Run the Burbs
- Website: www.samanthawan.com

Samantha Wan is a Canadian actress, screenwriter, producer, and web series creator. She is known for co-creating, writing, and starring in the City television series Second Jen. Since 2017, she has starred in the Global Television Network series Private Eyes, and in 2022 CBC's Run the Burbs.

== Career ==
Wan began her career in the early 2010s, playing supporting roles in several low-budget productions, including a recurring role on the popular web series Out with Dad.

=== Second Jen ===
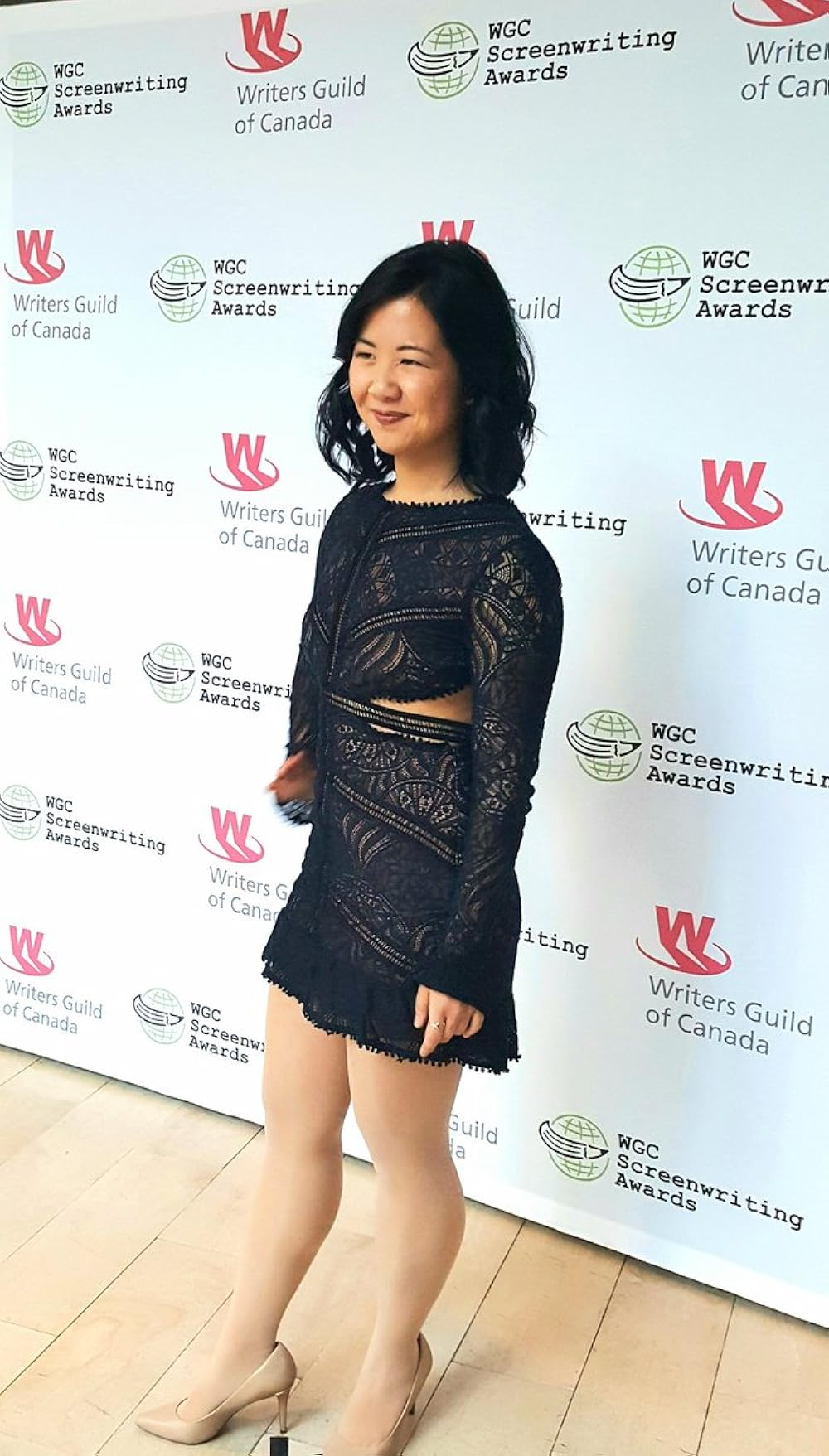
Wan in 2023

Wan garnered further attention in 2016, when she co-created, co-wrote, and starred in the Canadian sitcom Second Jen, alongside Amanda Joy. The series follows two young Asian Canadian women experiencing the ups and downs of being independent after moving out of their parents' homes for the first time.

The series received mixed reviews from critics upon release; Brad Wheeler of The Globe and Mail hailed the show as "A Laverne & Shirley for the Digital Age" as it stars "two sparky second-generation Asian-Canadian millennial women coming of age in an era so economically challenging that Laverne and Shirley would be crying in their beers instead of merrily goofing off at the bottling plant." In contrast, John Doyle, also of The Globe and Mail, panned the show, calling it "light, slight, silly and only occasionally outright funny." However, he also called it "mediocre," writing: "Second Jen is notable for having two female Asian lead characters but it is not notable, nor funny, as a comedy."

Nevertheless, it was renewed for a second season in late 2017. The second season premiered on August 4, 2018.

Second Jen was cancelled after its third season in 2021.

=== Other work ===
In addition to her work on Second Jen, Wan is also the creator, writer, and star of Sudden Master, which is a female-centric web series that focuses on Chinese martial arts. It was funded and produced with OMNI and has won several awards, including Best Action Series at the Vancouver Web Series Festival in 2016. The series was released on YouTube via the KindaTV channel, which is run by Smokebomb Entertainment.

As of 2022, she has a recurring role in the CBC Television sitcom Run the Burbs.

== Personal life ==
Wan is of Chinese descent. In interviews, Wan has been outspoken about the need for more diversity and accurate Asian representation on television and in the media.
