= Lauren Dahl =

Canadian actress, artist

- Born: October 24, 1978; North York, Ontario, Canada
- Died: December 12, 2004 (aged 26); Hollywood, Los Angeles, California, U.S.
- Other names: Lauren Bess Dahl Foley
- Education: Cardinal Carter Academy for the Arts
- Occupations: Actress; artist
- Years active: 1997-2004
- Known for: The Last Don; Diagnosis: Murder

Lauren Dahl (October 24, 1978 - December 12, 2004) was a Canadian actress and artist. She is known for her roles in The Last Don, Finding Kelly and Diagnosis: Murder.

== Early life ==
Dahl was born in North York, Ontario, Canada. She attended Cardinal Carter Academy for the Arts in Toronto, Ontario, Canada.

== Career ==
Dahl appeared in the miniseries The Last Don. Other television shows include Party of Five. She was on Diagnosis: Murder, playing the character Dr. Carla Meyer. She also appeared in the mystery film, Finding Kelly. Dahl moved to Los Angeles where she apprenticed with artist Bryten Goss. Her work was displayed at an art show in Los Angeles hosted by actor Danny Masterson and purchased by celebrities such as Jason Lee.

== Personal life ==
Dahl has two sisters, Caitlin Dahl and Melinda Dahl, who are both actresses.

== Death ==
Dahl died in a car accident in Hollywood, Los Angeles on December 12, 2004. She was killed instantly when the driver of the car she was in lost control on a foggy night and collided with a van. The Lauren Dahl Artist Foundation has been created to preserve her work and assist other artists to promote their work.

== Filmography ==
=== Film ===
Year	Film	Role	Notes
2000	Finding Kelly	Nita Harold	Mystery family film

=== Television ===
Year	Title	Role	Notes
1997	The Last Don	Maya	Episode: "Part II"
1998	Party of Five	Dee Dee	Episode: "Parent Trap"
1999	Diagnosis: Murder	Dr. Carla Meyer	Episode: "The Killer Within"
