= Devil's Mile =

- Directed by: Joseph O'Brien
- Written by: Joseph O'Brien
- Produced by: Joseph O'Brien; Mark Opausky; Motek Sherman
- Starring: David Hayter; Maria del Mar; Casey Hudecki; Amanda Joy Lim; Frank Moore; Adrienne Kress; Samantha Wan; Shara Kim; Craig Porritt
- Cinematography: David Z. Lam; Brian Chambers
- Edited by: Joyce Poon; Joseph O'Brien
- Music by: Chris Alexander
- Production companies: Grovers Mill Productions; Swim Pictures
- Distributed by: Phase 4 Films
- Release dates: July 26, 2014 (FIFF); August 12, 2014
- Running time: 88 minutes
- Country: Canada
- Language: English

Devil's Mile is a 2014 Canadian horror film and the feature film directorial debut of Joseph O'Brien, who also wrote the script (developed in collaboration with producer Mark Opausky) and created the film's visual effects. The film premiered at the Fantasia Film Festival on July 26, 2014, and was released on DVD and VOD on August 12, 2014. The film arrived on AMC's premiere horror streaming service Shudder on May 11, 2020.

It stars Casey Hudecki, Maria del Mar and David Hayter as a team of kidnappers who find themselves lost on a sinister stretch of highway where the laws of not only time and space, but life and death, no longer apply.

O'Brien cast the film with a mixture of newcomers and faces familiar to genre audiences. He re-united with Maria del Mar, having first worked with her on the Sci-Fi Channel miniseries Robocop: Prime Directives, which he co-wrote. The physically demanding lead role of Jacinta was written specifically for Casey Hudecki, whose background as a stage actor and stunt performer made her ideal for the part. O'Brien was already a fan of David Hayter's work as both a writer and actor, and was delighted when he agreed to join the cast as the villainous Toby after reading the script.

== Synopsis ==
Toby (David Hayter), Cally (Maria del Mar), and Jacinta (Casey Hudecki) are a fractious team of professional kidnappers who become lost while en route to deliver a valuable "package"—two teenage girls, Kanako (Amanda Joy) and Suki (Samantha Wan) -- to their employer Mr. Arkadi (Frank Moore), a mysterious and terrifying mob boss. Tensions between the group reach critical mass after a botched escape attempt leaves Kanako dead, a failure that the notoriously cruel Arkadi will not forgive. As the survivors struggle to find an escape from the dire consequences awaiting them, they discover they have a bigger problem: Devil's Mile, the lonely stretch of highway they've found themselves on, seems to have no end. But when Kanako returns from the dead, transformed into a shape-shifting demonic entity (Shara Kim), they are forced to accept that the laws of not only time and space, but life and death, no longer apply. With no escape in sight, secrets are exposed, true identities are revealed, and one of them discovers that redemption can be had... at a terrible price.

== Cast ==
- David Hayter as Toby McTeague
- Maria del Mar as Callista "Cally" Chavez
- Casey Hudecki as Jacinta "JC" Ballantine
- Amanda Joy Lim as Kanako Kobayashi
- Samantha Wan as Suki Tsuburaya
- Frank Moore as Mr. Arkadi
- Adrienne Kress as Cally's Girlfriend
- Shara Kim as Demon
- Craig Porritt as The Caretaker

== Reception ==
The film received polarized reviews. Shock Till You Drop panned the film overall, criticizing the film's script and direction, as they felt that O'Brien "goes overboard with the tricks and gimmicks." Bloody Disgusting was also highly critical of the film and commented that they saw the film as being "weird for weirdness sake, without any real thematic or pulpy endgame in mind"

However, Twitch Film praised the film's visual elements, script, and post effects, stating that "O'Brien displays the right amount of patience to get the right amount of tension out of his audience.", while Ain't It Cool News enthused that the film "throws everything and a flaming kitchen sink at the bandits and the viewer.", while also noting "O’Brien ends up wrapping it up rather poetically with a few smart twists along the way."
