= Lily Gao =

Canadian actress

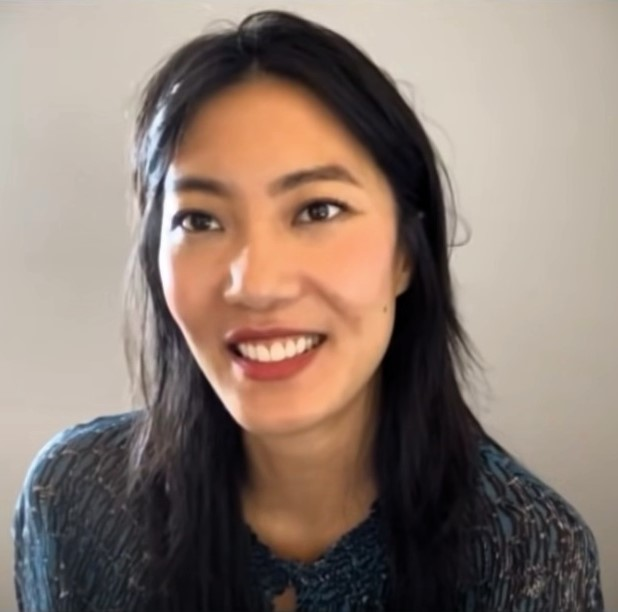
Gao interviewed by RE Database in 2023

Lily Gao (Chinese: 高雪蓮; pinyin: Gāo xuělián) is a Chinese-born Canadian actress who had roles in the TV shows The Expanse and Second Jen. She portrayed Ada Wong in Resident Evil: Welcome to Raccoon City and the 2023 video game Resident Evil 4.

== Filmography ==
=== Film ===
| Year | Title | Role | Notes | Refs |
|---|---|---|---|---|
| 2013 | Doyers Street | | Short film | |
| 2018 | Kin | Female cleaner | | |
| 2018 | Through Black Spruce | Lauren | | |
| 2019 | Rabid | Stella | | |
| 2019 | Resolve | Older Allie | Short film | |
| 2021 | Die in a Gunfight | Lily | | |
| 2021 | Between Realities Along the Edge of Time | Maureen | Short film | |
| 2021 | Resident Evil: Welcome to Raccoon City | Ada Wong | | |
| 2022 | The End of Sex | Kelly | | |
| 2023 | Dream Scenario | Realtor | | |
| 2023 | Christmas with the Knightlys | Nikki | | |
| 2024 | Blue Sun Palace | | | |
| 2024 | Believer | Nurse Li | | |

=== Television ===
| Year | Title | Role | Notes | Refs |
|---|---|---|---|---|
| 2012 | True Justice | Mei | 2 episodes | |
| 2014 | Transporter: The Series | Nicole | Episode: "Euphro" | |
| 2016–2018 | Second Jen | Karen | 7 episodes | |
| 2016–2017 | Blood and Water | Jennifer | 3 episodes | |
| 2017 | Mayday | Flight attendant | Episode: "Deadly Solution" | |
| 2018 | Carter | Siobhan | Episode: "Harley's Got a Gun" | |
| 2018–2020 | Letterkenny | Ellen | 5 episodes | |
| 2019 | My Mother's Killer Boyfriend | Lily Yamato | Television film | |
| 2019 | The Handmaid's Tale | Evelyn Chu | Episode: "Under His Eye" | |
| 2019 | Private Eyes | Michelle Choi | Episode: "It Happened One Fight" | |
| 2019 | Art of Falling in Love | Carolyn | Television film | |
| 2019–2020 | The Expanse | Nancy Gao | 7 episodes | |
| 2020 | Rising Suns | | 3 episodes | |
| 2020 | Transplant | Lucy Marsh | 2 episodes | |
| 2020 | Grand Army | S.A.N.E. | Episode: "Valentine's Day" | |
| 2021 | Chapelwaite | Maya Boone | 2 episodes | |
| 2021 | Coroner | Officer Spears | Episode: "Christmas Eve" | |
| 2022 | Hudson & Rex | Emily | Episode: "Roses of Signal Hill" | |
| 2022 | Catering Christmas | Isabella | Television film | |
| 2022 | Christmas in Rockwell | Sara | Television film | |
| 2023 | The Love Club | Sydney Wei | 4 episodes | |
| 2023 | Slip | Vanessa | 3 episodes | |
| 2024 | Operation Nutcracker | Vanessa | Television film | |
| 2025 | Doc | Luna Elliot | Episode: "One Small Step" | |
| 2025 | Twisted Metal | Jessica | Episode: "DOLF4C3" | |
| 2026 | Avatar: The Last Airbender | Ursa | 2 episodes | |

=== Video games ===
| Year | Title | Role | Notes | Refs |
|---|---|---|---|---|
| 2023 | Resident Evil 4 | Ada Wong | | |
| 2025 | Goddess of Victory: Nikke | Ada Wong | | |
