= Second Jen =

2016 Canadian television sitcom

- Genre: Sitcom
- Starring: Amanda Joy; Samantha Wan; Munro Chambers; Al Mukadam; Janet Lo; Atticus Mitchell; Nile Séguin; Lily Gao
- Country of origin: Canada
- Original language: English
- No. of seasons: 3
- No. of episodes: 18

Production
- Running time: 30 minutes
- Production company: Don Ferguson Productions

Original release
- Network: City (first season); Omni
- Release: October 27, 2016 – March 21, 2021

Second Jen is a Canadian television sitcom that premiered on City on October 27, 2016. The series is produced by Don Ferguson Productions and stars Amanda Joy and Samantha Wan as Mo and Jen, two young East Asian Canadian women experiencing the ups and downs of being independent after moving out of their parents' homes for the first time. Joy and Wan are also co-creators and writers for the series.

Following its release in 2016, the series received mixed reviews. In 2018, Omni Television announced it had commissioned a second season. It premiered on August 4, 2018. On February 8, 2019, the second season was nominated for Best Comedy Series by the Academy of Canadian Cinema & Television. The third and final season premiered February 14, 2021.

== Cast and characters ==
- Amanda Joy as Jennifer 'Mo' Monteloyola
- Samantha Wan as Jennifer 'Jen' Wu
- Munro Chambers as Nate (Season 1)
- Al Mukadam as Lewis (Season 1)
- Janet Lo as Bunny
- Atticus Mitchell as Garth (Season 1)
- Nile Séguin as Alister
- Lily Gao as Karen
- Lovell Adams-Gray as Marcus (Season 2)
- Oscar Moreno as Diego
- Andrew Bushell as Riley (Season 3)
- Isabel Kanaan as Scout (Season 3)

== Episodes ==
Season	Episodes	Originally released	
Season	Episodes	First released	Last released
1	6	October 27, 2016	December 1, 2016
2	6	August 4, 2018	September 8, 2018
3	6	February 14, 2021	March 21, 2021

=== Season 1 (2016) ===
No. overall	No. in season	Title	Directed by	Written by	Original release date	Canada viewers (millions)
1	1	"Couch Surfing"	Unknown	Unknown	October 27, 2016	N/A
2	2	"Jenny Has the Gay"	Unknown	Unknown	November 3, 2016	N/A
3	3	"Re-Tales"	Unknown	Unknown	November 10, 2016	N/A
4	4	"Borrow-a-Buddy Forever"	Unknown	Unknown	November 17, 2016	N/A
5	5	"Pap Fiction"	Unknown	Unknown	November 24, 2016	N/A
6	6	"Asian Night"	Unknown	Unknown	December 1, 2016	N/A

=== Season 2 ===
No. overall	No. in season	Title	Directed by	Written by	Original release date	Canada viewers (millions)
7	1	"Forecast Calls for Wedding Showers"	Romeo Candido	Carly Heffernan	August 4, 2018	N/A
8	2	"The Break In"	Romeo Candido	Carly Heffernan	August 11, 2018	N/A
9	3	"Like a Girl"	Romeo Candido & Samantha Wan	Amanda Joy	August 18, 2018	N/A
10	4	"The Book of Jenesis"	Romeo Candido	Amanda Joy	August 25, 2018	N/A
11	5	"No Escape Room"	Romeo Candido	Carly Heffernan	September 1, 2018	N/A
12	6	"Wall Squirrelly"	Romeo Candido	Carly Heffernan & Amanda Joy	September 8, 2018	N/A

=== Season 3 ===
No. overall	No. in season	Title	Directed by	Written by	Original release date	Canada viewers (millions)
13	1	"Vive Le Conflict Resolution"	Unknown	Unknown	February 14, 2021	N/A
14	2	"Happy Birthday"	Unknown	Unknown	February 21, 2021	N/A
15	3	"Sense and Sensuality"	Unknown	Unknown	February 28, 2021	N/A
16	4	"Exes and CEOS"	Unknown	Unknown	March 7, 2021	N/A
17	5	"In Session"	Unknown	Unknown	March 14, 2021	N/A
18	6	"Balikbayan"	Unknown	Unknown	March 21, 2021	N/A

== Development ==
Show creators Amanda Joy and Samantha Wan met on the set of the 2014 film Devil's Mile. Tired of auditioning for the same stereotypical East Asian roles, they discussed creating their own work together.

Joy and Wan stated that their show was originally rejected at an unnamed Canadian pitch contest. It later went on to win Best Television Pitch at NexTV L.A. in 2013, before being picked up for development with Rogers. Joy wrote the original pilot script, with Wan directing alongside Joseph O'Brien. The original spec pilot screened at Toronto's Reelworld Film Festival in 2014, as well as Toronto's Asian Heritage Month.

== Reception ==
Prior to the release of the show, Tony Wong of the Toronto Star published an article declaring Second Jen "groundbreaking" in its depiction of two female East Asian leads "as if we had already arrived in a post-racial world."

Brad Oswald of the Winnipeg Free Press praised Second Jen, calling it "Sharp, funny, slightly cheeky and smartly in tune with this country’s diverse demographic mix." Oswald wrote that "while it’s fair to say that attitude plays a bit part in this likable series’ early success, there are actually several elements that make Second Jen a must-see production." Oswald also praised the strength of the cast noting that Joy and Wan are particularly "likeable and relatable" in the lead roles of Jen and Mo.

Toronto Life's Will Sloan complimented the show's light-hearted tone. He noted that, while "not necessarily laugh out loud funny," Second Jen is a pleasant watch, with strong moments carried by "the likability of its goofy cast, and the familiar streets, bars and houses of its Little Italy setting." Sloan also praised Joy and Wan's performances, calling them breakout stars.

Brad Wheeler of The Globe and Mail hailed the show as "A Laverne & Shirley for the Digital Age" as it stars "two sparky second-generation Asian-Canadian millennial women coming of age in an era so economically challenging that Laverne and Shirley would be crying in their beers instead of merrily goofing off at the bottling plant."

In contrast, John Doyle, also of The Globe and Mail, panned the show, calling it "light, slight, silly and only occasionally outright funny [...] Second Jen is notable for having two female Asian lead characters but it is not notable, nor funny, as a comedy."
