= Bryten Goss =

American painter

- Born: August 23, 1976
- Died: October 26, 2006 (aged 30)
- Known for: Painting
- Movement: Contemporary
- Patrons: Jason Lee, Danny Masterson, Giovanni Ribisi

Bryten Edward Goss (August 23, 1976 – October 26, 2006) was an American contemporary figurative painter. A self-taught native Californian, he began having exhibitions in Los Angeles at the age of 16.

His works include the Triumph of Death series, Alex on Pig, Two Women Riding Pigs, The Little Pope, The Blind Leading the Blind, and his burning building pieces such as Tribecca. When asked about being an artist in Los Angeles instead of New York, Goss said, "If I was a shoemaker, would I go to a town where everybody had shoes or to a town where nobody was wearing them?."

According to Goss, his influences include Alfred Kubin, Pieter Bruegel, Caravaggio, Lucian Freud, Edgar Degas, Egon Schiele, Alberto Giacometti, Balthus, Stanley Spencer, and his mother, Rose.

Some celebrities who have owned paintings by Goss include Nicolas Cage, Jason Lee, Nancy Cartwright. Also, Kevin Smith commissioned Goss to paint a portrait of Smith's wife, Jennifer.

The Bryten Goss Foundation for the Arts was established in order to organize, catalog, and promote his work.
