= Amanda Joy =

Canadian actress

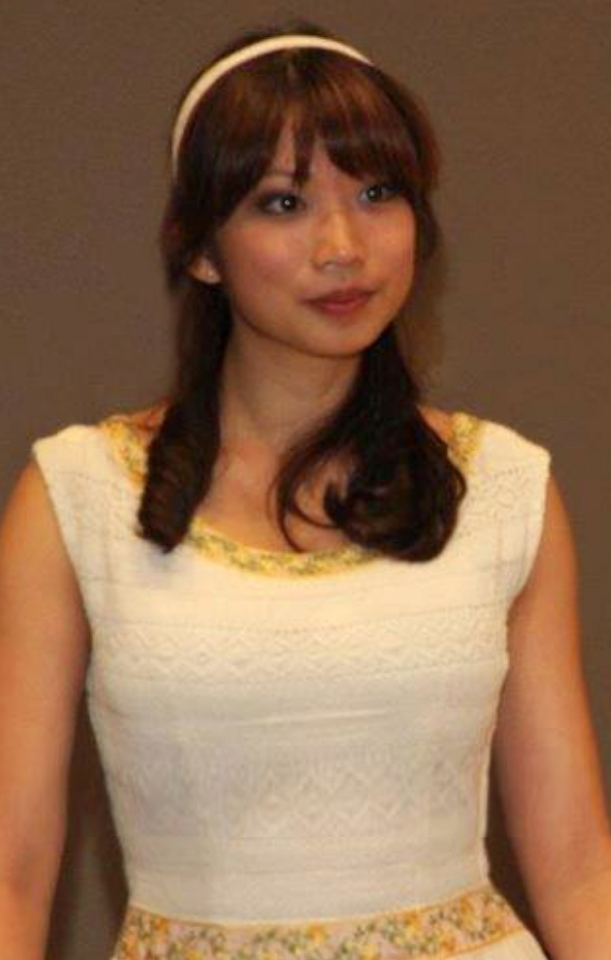
- Joy in 2014
- Education: Cardinal Carter Academy for the Arts
- Alma mater: Ryerson University (now Toronto Metropolitan University)
- Occupations: Actress, comedian, screenwriter, producer
- Years active: 2001–present
- Notable work: Mo on Second Jen, Kanako in Devil's Mile

Amanda Joy is a Canadian actress, screenwriter, comedian, satirist, and producer. She is best known for co-creating and starring in the Omni Television original series Second Jen.

== Early life and education ==
Joy studied vocal music at Cardinal Carter Academy for the Arts, before pursuing Contemporary Studies at Ryerson University (now Toronto Metropolitan University). Joy's mother is Filipina, and her father is of Chinese descent. Joy starred in her first short film as a child in 2001, under the name Amanda Joy Lim.

While originally training for a career in musical theatre (and later film), a high school teacher encouraged her to pursue screenwriting.

== Career ==
Joy achieved recognition in 2016 when her sitcom, Second Jen, premiered on City. Joy has professed her desire to combat the invisibility and misrepresentation of Filipinos in western media. She has also been outspoken about the need for more diversity on TV, telling interviewers that she would "like to stop seeing [diversity] as an intentional choice," adding that she wants "kids growing up now to see people who look like them onscreen."

She was featured by FLARE as one of five Canadian "rabble rousers," telling the magazine she believes "many [women of colour] are leaders despite forces that see [them] as unworthy, as threats, as less than—as other."

Joy writes for the online satirical news site, The Beaverton, covering topics including: Hollywood whitewashing, online dating, and sexism in journalism.

=== Awards ===
In 2017, Joy was nominated for a Writers Guild of Canada Award for Second Jen's pilot script "Couch Surfing." In 2019, she was nominated for a Canadian Screen Award for the second season of Second Jen, and for Best Comedy Script at the Writers Guild of Canada Awards for the Second Jen episode "Like a Girl." In 2022 she won a Writers Guild of Canada award for Amelia Parker/The Parker Andersons. Joy has also received a shared Canadian Screen Award nomination for Son of a Critch.

=== Influences ===
Joy credits Radio Free Vestibule as her earliest comic influence.

== Personal life ==
Joy's hobbies include weight-lifting, and playing video games. She is a supporter of the Toronto Blue Jays.
