= Chaffee =

Chaffee or Chafee may refer to:

== Places ==
=== United States ===
- Chaffee, Missouri, a city
- Chaffee, New York, a hamlet
- Chaffee, North Dakota, an unincorporated community
- Chaffee, West Virginia, an extinct town
- Chaffee County, Colorado
- Lake Chaffee, Connecticut
  - Lake Chaffee (CDP), Connecticut, lakeside community

=== Outer space ===
- Chaffee (crater), on the far side of the Moon
- Chaffee Hill, unofficial name of one of the Apollo 1 Hills on Mars

== In the military ==
- M24 Chaffee, a World War II and later light tank
- Fort Chaffee Maneuver Training Center, Arkansas, previously named Camp Chaffee, then Fort Chaffee
- USS Chafee (DDG-90), a guided missile destroyer
- USS Chaffee (DE-230), a World War II destroyer escort

== People ==
- Chaffee (surname), a list of people with the surname Chaffee or Chafee

== Other uses ==
- Fresno Chaffee Zoo, Fresno, California
- Chaffee Art Center, Rutland, Vermont

== See also ==
- Roger B. Chaffee Planetarium
- Loomis Chaffee, a school in Windsor, Connecticut
