= Uncommon Women and Others (film) =

- Created by: Wendy Wasserstein
- Starring: Meryl Streep; Swoosie Kurtz; Jill Eikenberry

Original release
- Network: PBS
- Release: May 1978

Uncommon Women and Others is a 1978 made-for-television film (based upon the play of the same name. Wendy Wasserstein wrote both the original play as well as the teleplay for the televised production. It was shown in May, 1978 as part of the Great Performances series on PBS. It was directed by Steven Robman and included all of the original cast from the 1977 Off-Broadway debut (with the exception of Glenn Close who was replaced by Meryl Streep).

== Plot summary ==
Alumnae of Mount Holyoke College (Wasserstein's alma mater) meet for lunch one day in 1978 and talk about their time together in college. The play is thus a series of flashbacks to the 1972–1973 school year as seven seniors and one freshman try to "discover themselves" in the wake of second-wave feminism.

== Cast ==
- Meryl Streep - Leilah
- Swoosie Kurtz - Rita Altabel
- Jill Eikenberry - Kate Quin
- Ellen Parker - Muffet DiNicola
- Ann McDonough - Samantha Stewart
- Alma Cuervo - Holly Kaplan
- Josephine Nicholas - Mrs. Plumm
- Cynthia Herman - Susie Friend
- Anna Levine - Carter
- Alexander Scourby - Narrator (voice)
