= Fran Bull =

American artist

Fran Bull (born 1938) is an American sculptor, painter, and print-maker living and working in Brandon, Vermont and Barcelona, Spain.

== Personal life and education ==
In her childhood, Bull frequented the Newark Museum of Art in New Jersey to study. Bull next expanded her studies into painting when she attended Bennington College, headed at the time by artist Paul Freely, where she graduated with a B.A. in Music and Art in 1960.

In 1969, she married painter Malcolm Morley. The marriage lasted until their divorce in 1972, yet his pieces would go on to influence her earliest works. She would then attend New York University, where she graduated in 1980 with an M.A. degree in Art and Art Education.

== Career ==
Bull became known originally for her Photorealism paintings made in the mid 1970s and 80s. Among her most famous Photorealist works are Flamingo Stereopticon, Lincoln Center Reclining Figure and Winged Narcissus. This earlier work was influenced by her mentor and ex-husband, Malcolm Morley and by the Pop spirit of Photorealism. It was shown and sold through the Louis K. Meisel Gallery in New York City and has been collected widely in Kansas City through the Morgan Gallery, owned before her death by curator and gallerist Myra Morgan. During this time, Bull was one of the most noted photo-realists along with Morley.

In the late 1980s, Bull’s art began to develop towards abstraction, or neo-abstract expressionism. Instead of seeking to depict the familiar, touchable surfaces of this world, Bull felt compelled to investigate and capture the teeming, yet unseen forces giving rise to those surfaces. In her break-through series of paintings The Magdalene Cycle (1992) for example, the large canvases seem to lay bare the hidden energies and biomorphic entities that animate and enliven the physical realm.

Sparked by her newfound approach to painting, in the mid-1990s Bull began to explore other media. Since that time her artistic output has included performance art, sculpture, mixed media, and printmaking, as well as painting. She has been especially prolific in the area of printmaking, creating numerous bodies of work in collaboration with master printer Virgili Barbara at Taller 46, a prestigious printmaking studio in Barcelona, Spain. At the height of their careers, Picasso, Tàpies, Miró and Saura also worked in this place with the founder and father of Virgili, Joan Barbara.

In 2003 Bull’s award-winning series of carborundum etchings entitled Barcelona! (2001) was exhibited at Gallerie Universitini in Plzeň, Czech Republic. The Barcelona! etchings are surging pictures whose influences are redolent of those natural structures created by the forces of wind, water and organic process. Bull has produced many diverse series of etchings that continue to be exhibited worldwide.

Bull’s most recent works on canvas, Dark Matter (2008), are relief or sculptural paintings. Bull uses the term “topographies” to describe these works. The images in the Dark Matter series appear to be growing off the canvas, and, like her earlier abstract paintings, they appear to be covering and uncovering at once, the mysteries dwelling below the visible surfaces of this world.

In 2009, Bull debuted In Flanders Fields: A Meditation on War, a series of installations based on the poem In Flanders Fields by World War I Lieutenant Colonel John McCrae. Inspired by her personal experience witnessing World War II as a child, Bull sought to emulate the poem's portrayal of the devastation of war and a hope for peace through depicting the symbols and imagery in print and sculpture. These symbols would include the flying larks, the fields of poppies, and the dead that laid among them. Exhibitions of In Flanders Fields were shown at the Carving Studio and Sculpture Center in Rutland, Vermont in 2009, the Woman Made Gallery in 2010, the Christine Price Gallery at Castleton College in 2011, the Chaffee Art Center in 2015, and the Henry Sheldon Museum in 2018.

When she is not working in Barcelona, Bull lives and works in Vermont, where in 2005 she founded Gallery in-the-Field, a fine art gallery and performance space, whose mission is to present the work of provocative, innovative living artists.

Along with the production of her own art, Bull teaches in universities and art schools throughout the United States and abroad.

Fran Bull is represented by Walker Fine Art in Denver, Colorado.

== Books ==
In 1990, Bull collaborated with Ann Salwey on an artist's book Mordant Rhymes for Modern Times.

In Barcelona in 2001, Bull co-authored an artist's book with Carolyn Corbett: Balm of Dreams = Bálsamo de mis sueños. It combines Corbett's love poetry with Bull's copper plate etchings, "Suite Sweet."

In 2019, Bull collaborated with Yolanda Cuomo to create a book that showcases her poetry and visual art titled "Choose your own title."
