= Roger B. Chaffee Planetarium =

Coordinates: 42°57′56″N 85°40′37″W

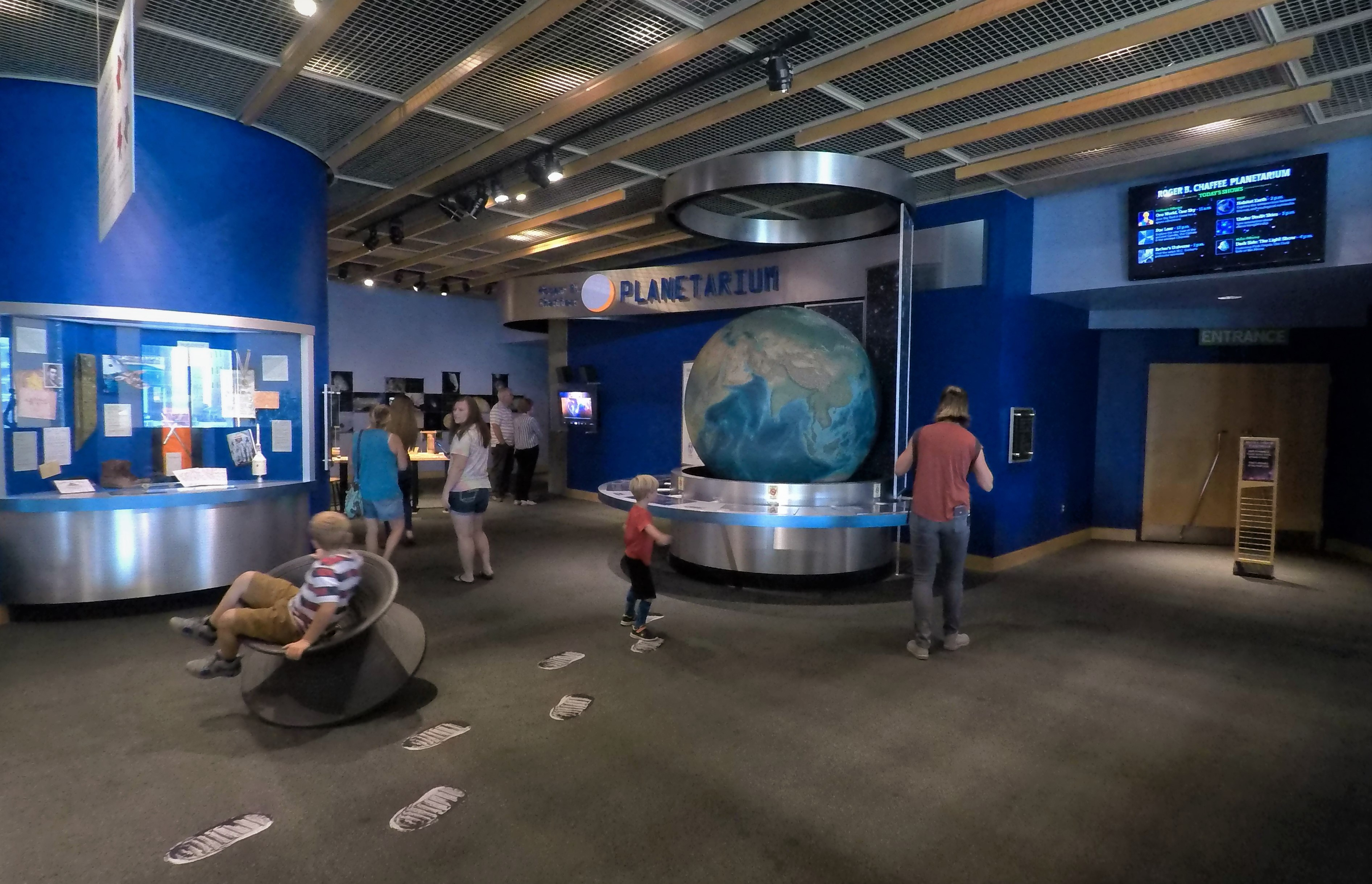

The Roger B. Chaffee Planetarium, named for astronaut Roger B. Chaffee, was constructed in the early 1960s as part of the Public Museum of Grand Rapids. The facility initially featured a 30-foot (9.1 m) plaster dome and a Goto Optics mechanical star projector. Among the planetarium's first shows was "Star of Wonder", an astronomical attempt at an explanation of the Star of Bethlehem. The show received positive reviews in the Grand Rapids area and remained in the Chaffee's catalogue for several years.

The Chaffee, then known as the Planetarium of the Public Museum of Grand Rapids, came under the curatorship of David L. DeBruyn in 1964. A young man fresh out of college at the University of Michigan, DeBruyn helped found the Great Lakes Planetarium Association in 1965, hosting the first meeting in Grand Rapids. In 1967 the theater was dedicated as the Roger B. Chaffee Planetarium, following the death of the astronaut in the Apollo 1 mission.

During the late 1960s the Grand Rapids Amateur Astronomical Association began a project to construct a new dark sky observatory in the Grand Rapids area. A site was leased to them on Kissing Rock Hill and the James C. Veen Observatory was constructed by the Association members, with some support from the Public Museum and Chaffee Planetarium. Today the Veen remains tied to the museum and the Chaffee.

In 1994 the planetarium was relocated to a new facility, along with the entire museum, where it would feature a new 50-foot (15 m) aluminum dome and the state-of the art projection system: a prototype of the Evans and Sutherland Digistar II digital star projector, running on Digistar software. Within a few years this was upgraded to software for Digistar II. The system also features three Sony video projectors, a Barco video projector, scores of Kodak ektagraphic slide projectors and even more special effect projectors and devices. The planetarium is well known for its many educational programs, as well as its unique library of laser light shows, many programmed at the Chaffee itself, making use of the unique effects of the Chaffee and innovative and original Digistar programming.

Visiting the Planetarium is a popular activity for students of all ages in Grand Rapids and across Michigan, from preschoolers who learn about the cycles of day and night, to elementary students studying the Solar System and stars, up to high schoolers and even college students focused on the more mysterious wonders of the universe. The Chaffee also draws in visitors to its educational public shows, especially its informal "Under Starlit Skies" descriptive astronomy lectures and spectacular laser light shows.

The Chaffee remains a member of the Great Lakes Planetarium Association, and as of 1995 began hosting conferences on the decennial anniversaries. David L. DeBruyn officially retired after forty years of curatorship in 2003, and still serves in an advisory capacity as a volunteer.

In 2014 the planetarium received a 1.2 million dollar upgrade.
