= Henry Gorski =

American painter

Henry Gorski (1918–2010) was an American Figurative Expressionist artist. Born in Buffalo, New York, of Polish descent, Gorski received his BFA from the University at Buffalo in 1939. Gorski lived in the New Haven, Connecticut, area, and was married to the textile artist Bernie Gorski.

Active from 1948 through 2003, Gorski's method and style developed throughout his long career. Gorski is widely known for his sports lithographs and self-portraits. His canvases deal actively with religion, politics, and human suffering.

Gorski's early work deals largely with his experiences in World War II while serving as a cartographer in the U.S. Navy. Later works deal with discomfort with the Vietnam War ("Ship of Fools"), sexuality ("The Rape of the Rose"), and his own family life ("The Child of Darkness"). Gorski termed much of his work from the 1960s as his "Pain-Things Series". These paintings were exhibited nationally and internationally and hung alongside works by Robert Rauschenberg, Andy Warhol, and Elaine de Kooning.

Later in his career, Gorski became very interested in the role of the athlete in society and created many art themed paintings, including "Blocked" and "Black Hawk Goalie". Gorski's last works dealt primarily with issues of disability, depicting autistic and developmentally disabled youths.

Many of Gorski's works have been collected by Albert J. Levis and are now part of the permanent collection of the Museum of the Creative Process. Levis, a psychiatrist, worked closely with Gorski, using Gorski's canvases to articulate a theory of unconscious dynamics present within the creative process.

In 2009, a Gorski retrospective was held at the Chaffee Art Center in Rutland, Vermont, titled "Stealing the Fire of the Gods". In 2011, the Art's Alive Gallery at Main Street Landing's Union Station in Burlington, Vermont, hosted the Gorski retrospective in an exhibit titled "Art as Evidence of Science".
