= Museum of the Creative Process =

Coordinates: 43°8′50.1″N 73°3′49.3″W

The Museum of the Creative Process is a museum and learning center dedicated to understanding the role of creativity as a conflict resolving mechanism. Founded and directed by Albert Levis, M.D., the museum brings together a global collection of contemporary and historical pieces of artwork. The museum is located on the grounds of the Wilburton Inn in Manchester, Vermont. The museum also holds traveling exhibits throughout New England.

The museum features four permanent exhibits: "The Gorski Retrospective"; "The Sculptural Trail"; "The Metaphoria Murals"; and "Wizard and Wisdom Collection".

The Gorski Retrospective features over a hundred canvases of the artist Henry Gorski, illustrating his psychological, emotional, and religious development. Presented chronologically, the exhibit illustrates cycles of conflict and resolution present within the artist's paintings. The Sculptural Trail presents the evolutions of religious paradigms, tracing the development of religion and its impact on society. The Metaphoria Murals illustrate Levis' psychological research, depicting diverse cultural models of resolving conflict, while highlighting universal patterns and common structures. The Panels of the Wizard of Oz deconstruct the story of The Wizard of Oz, analyzing the characters' unique identities, their personal journeys, and the power of Oz.

These four exhibits document Levis' research into the harmonics of the creative process as a physiological homeostatic response to stress. Levis detailed this method in his books Conflict Analysis: The Formal Theory of Behavior and Conflict Analysis Training, publications that evaluate the structure of unconscious dynamics.

The Gorski Retrospective was exhibited in 2009 at the Chaffee Art Center in Rutland, Vermont, as well as in Burlington, Vermont, at the Main Street Landing Gallery at Union Station during July and August 2011.
