= Steven Robman =

American television and theatre director (born 1944)

- Born: September 27, 1944 (age 81)
- Education: University of California, Berkeley (BA); Yale University (MFA)
- Occupations: Television director; theatre director; theatrical producer
- Spouse: Kathy Baker (m. 2003)

Steven I. "Steve" Robman (born September 27, 1944) is an American television and theatre director/producer.

== Biography ==
Steve Robman graduated from Alexander Hamilton High School in Los Angeles, California (1962), University of California, Berkeley (1966), and the Yale School of Drama (1973).

He has been married to actress Kathy Baker since 2003.

He was Artistic Director of the Phoenix Theatre in New York City from 1980 to 1982. He has also staged plays at the Manhattan Theatre Club, Playwrights Horizons, Long Wharf Theatre, the Guthrie Theater, Arena Stage, Actors Theatre of Louisville, Mark Taper Forum, Yale Repertory Theatre, and the Goodman Theatre. He has directed more than 100 hours of television, including dramatic and comedy series as well as movies-of-the-week.

== Television directing credits ==
- Ghost Whisperer
- Shark
- Pasadena
- Strong Medicine
- Relative Chaos
- Hello Sister, Goodbye Life
- Picking Up & Dropping Off
- Medium
- Windfall
- Love Rules
- I Do, They Don't
- The O.C.
- Gilmore Girls
- The Guardian
- Thieves
- Boston Public
- American Dreams
- The Audrey Hepburn Story (including Co-Executive Producer)
- Bull
- Charles in Charge
- The Sons of Mistletoe
- Time of Your Life
- Dawson's Creek
- Blood on Her Hands
- L.A. Firefighters
- Moloney
- Party of Five
- Nowhere Man
- Murder One
- The Client
- Doogie Howser, M.D.
- Law & Order
- Diagnosis: Murder
- L.A. Law
- Melrose Place
- Brand New Life
- Baby Boom
- Northern Exposure
- Sisters
- thirtysomething
- Sweet Justice
- SeaQuest DSV
- Silver Spoons
- Family Ties
- The Facts of Life
- Theatre In America: Sea Marks
- Hull High
- Uncommon Women and Others (He has also directed the stage play that the movie was based on)
