= Walburg Township, North Dakota =

Township in North Dakota, US

- Township
- Location within North Dakota
- Coordinates: 46°45′35″N 97°22′02″W
- Country: United States
- State: North Dakota
- County: Cass

Area
  - Total: 35.983 sq mi (93.20 km^{2})
  - Land: 35.978 sq mi (93.18 km^{2})
  - Water: 0.005 sq mi (0.013 km^{2})
- Elevation: 974 ft (297 m)

Population (2020)
  - Total: 111
  - Density: 3.09/sq mi (1.19/km^{2})
- Time zone: UTC-6 (Central (CST))
  - Summer (DST): UTC-5 (CDT)
- Area code: 701
- FIPS code: 38-82740
- GNIS feature ID: 1036366

Walburg Township is a township in Cass County, North Dakota, United States. The population was 111 at the 2020 census.

The unincorporated community of Chaffee is located in Walburg Township.

== Geography ==
Walburg Township has a total area of 35.983 square miles (93.20 km^{2}), of which 35.978 square miles (93.18 km^{2}) is land and 0.005 square miles (0.013 km^{2}) is water.

== Demographics ==
As of the 2023 American Community Survey, there were an estimated 62 households.
