= Chaffee (surname) =

Chaffee or Chafee is a surname. Notable people with the surname include:

- Ada Gilmore Chaffee (1883–1955), American watercolorist and printmaker
- Adna Chaffee (1842–1914), American lieutenant general
- Adna R. Chaffee Jr. (1884–1941), American major general, son of Adna
- Cathleen Chaffee, American curator, art historian
- Calvin C. Chaffee (1811–1896), American doctor, politician and abolitionist
- Emory Leon Chaffee (1885–1975), American physicist and engineer
- George D. Chafee (1839–1927), American politician and lawyer
- Harold G. Chaffee (1926–2020), American football player and coach
- Jerome B. Chaffee (1825–1886), American entrepreneur and senator from Colorado
- John Chafee (1922–1999), American politician and Secretary of the Navy
- Judith Chafee (1932–1998), American architect
- Lincoln Chafee (born 1953), Rhode Island governor and U.S. Senator; son of John
- Oliver Newberry Chaffee (1910–1944), American painter and printmaker
- Rick Chaffee (born 1945), American skier, brother of Suzy
- Roger B. Chaffee (1935–1967), American Apollo astronaut
- Suzy Chaffee (born 1946), American skier and actress
- Zechariah Chafee (1885–1957), American free speech and legal scholar

Fictional characters

- Alan Chaffee, in the 1995 film Village of the Damned

== See also ==
- Chaffey (surname)
