= Wendy Wasserstein =

American playwright (1950–2006)

- Born: October 18, 1950; Brooklyn, New York City, U.S.
- Died: January 30, 2006 (aged 55); Manhattan, New York City, U.S.
- Education: Mount Holyoke College (BA); City University of New York, City College (MA); Yale University (MFA)
- Children: 1
- Relatives: Bruce Wasserstein (brother)
- Writing career
- Period: 1977–2006
- Notable awards: Pulitzer Prize for Drama (1989); Tony Award for Best Play (1989)

Wendy Wasserstein (October 18, 1950 – January 30, 2006) was an American playwright. She was an Andrew Dickson White Professor-at-Large at Cornell University. She received the Tony Award for Best Play and the Pulitzer Prize for Drama in 1989 for her play The Heidi Chronicles.

== Biography ==
=== Early years ===
Wasserstein was born to a Jewish family in Brooklyn, the daughter of Morris Wasserstein, a wealthy textile executive, and his wife, Lola (née Liska) Schleifer, who moved to the United States from Poland when her father was accused of being a spy. Wasserstein "once described her mother as being like 'Auntie Mame'". Lola Wasserstein reportedly inspired some of her daughter's characters. Wendy was the youngest of five siblings, including brother Bruce Wasserstein, a well-known investment banker. Her sister, Georgette, married psychiatrist Albert J. Levis, a Greek-American Holocaust Survivor.

Her maternal grandfather was Simon Schleifer, a yeshiva teacher in Włocławek, Poland, who moved to Paterson, New Jersey, and became a high school principal. Claims that Schleifer was a playwright are probably apocryphal, as contemporaries did not recall this and the assertion only appeared once Wasserstein had won the Pulitzer Prize for Drama.

A graduate of the Calhoun School (she attended from 1963 to 1967), Wasserstein earned a B.A. in history from Mount Holyoke College in 1971, an M.A. in creative writing from City College of New York in 1973, and an M.F.A. in fine arts from the Yale School of Drama in 1976. In 1990 she received an honoris causa Doctor of Humane Letters degree from Mount Holyoke College and in 2002 she received an honoris causa degree from Bates College.

=== Career ===
Wasserstein's first production of note was Uncommon Women and Others (her graduate thesis at Yale), a play which reflected her experiences as a student at, and an alumna of, Mount Holyoke College. The play was workshopped at the Eugene O’Neill Theater Center in 1977, and a full version of the play was produced in 1977 Off-Broadway with Glenn Close, Jill Eikenberry, and Swoosie Kurtz playing the lead roles. The play was subsequently produced for PBS with Meryl Streep replacing Close. While at Yale, she co-wrote a musical with fellow student Christopher Durang, When Dinah Shore Ruled the Earth.

In 1989, she won the Tony Award, the Susan Smith Blackburn Prize, and the Pulitzer Prize for Drama for her play The Heidi Chronicles.

Her plays, which explore topics ranging from feminism to family to ethnicity to pop culture, include The Sisters Rosensweig, Isn't It Romantic, An American Daughter, Old Money, and her last work, which opened in 2005, Third.

During her career, which spanned nearly four decades, Wasserstein wrote eleven plays, winning a Tony Award, a Pulitzer Prize, a New York Drama Critics Circle Award, a Drama Desk Award, and an Outer Critics Circle Award.

In addition, she wrote the screenplay for the 1998 film The Object of My Affection, which starred Jennifer Aniston and Paul Rudd.

Wasserstein is described as an author of women's identity crises. "Her heroines—intelligent and successful but also riddled with self-doubt—sought enduring love a little ambivalently, but they did not always find it, and their hard-earned sense of self-worth was often shadowed by the frustrating knowledge that American women's lives continued to be measured by their success at capturing the right man." In a conversation with novelist A. M. Homes, Wasserstein said that these heroines are the starting points for her plays: "I write from character, so it begins with people talking, which is why I like writing plays."

Wasserstein commented that her parents allowed her to go to Yale only because they were certain she would meet an eligible lawyer there, get married, and lead a conventional life as a wife and mother. Although appreciative of the critical acclaim for her comedic streak, she described her work as "a political act", wherein sassy dialogue and farcical situations mask deep, resonant truths about intelligent, independent women living in a world still ingrained with traditional roles and expectations.

In 2007 she was featured in the film Making Trouble, a tribute to female Jewish comedians, produced by the Jewish Women's Archive.

Wasserstein also wrote the books to two musicals. Miami, written in collaboration with Jack Feldman and Bruce Sussman, was presented at Playwrights Horizons in 1985–1986, and starred among others, Marcia Lewis, Phyllis Newman, Jane Krakowski, and Fisher Stevens. Pamela's First Musical, written with Cy Coleman and David Zippel, based on Wasserstein's children's book, received its world premiere in a concert staging at Town Hall in New York City on May 18, 2008.

She wrote the libretto for the opera Best Friends, based on Clare Boothe Luce's play The Women, but it was uncompleted when she died. It was subsequently completed by Christopher Durang, set by Deborah Drattell, and is in development with Lauren Flanigan.

In 1996 she appeared as the guest caller "Linda" on the Frasier episode "Head Game".

Wasserstein was named the President's Council of Cornell Women Andrew D. White Professor-at-Large in 2005.

=== Personal life and death ===
Wasserstein gave birth to a daughter, Lucy Jane, in 1999 when she was 48 years old. The baby, who was conceived via in vitro fertilization, was three months premature and is recorded in Wasserstein's collection of essays, Shiksa Goddess. Wasserstein, who was not married, never publicly identified her daughter's father.

Wasserstein was hospitalized with lymphoma in December 2005 and died at Memorial Sloan Kettering Cancer Center on January 30, 2006, at age 55. News of her death was unexpected because her illness had not been widely publicized outside the theater community. The night after she died, Broadway's lights were dimmed in her honor. In addition to her daughter, Wasserstein was survived by her mother and three siblings, Abner Wasserstein (who died 2011), businessman Bruce Wasserstein (who died in 2009), and Wilburton Inn owner Georgette Wasserstein Levis (who died in 2014).

== Bibliography ==
=== Plays ===
- Any Woman Can't (1973)
- Uncommon Women and Others (1977)
- Isn't It Romantic (1981)
- Tender Offer (1983)
- The Man in a Case (1985)
- The Heidi Chronicles (1988)
- The Sisters Rosensweig (1992)
- An American Daughter (1997)
- Old Money (2000)
- Psyche In Love (2004)
- Welcome to My Rash (2004)
- Third (2004)

=== Screenplays ===
- Tender Offer (1977)
- The Heidi Chronicles (1995)
- The Object of My Affection (1998)
- An American Daughter (2000)

=== Books ===
- Wasserstein, Wendy (1990). Bachelor Girls. New York: Knopf. ISBN 0-394-56199-6.
- Wasserstein, Wendy (1999). Pamela's First Musical. New York: Bt Bound. ISBN 0-613-08513-2.
- Wasserstein, Wendy (2001). Shiksa Goddess: Or, How I Spent My Forties: Essays (First ed.). New York: Knopf. ISBN 0-375-41165-8.
- Wasserstein, Wendy (2005). Sloth (First ed.). New York: Oxford University Press. ISBN 0-19-516630-2.
- Wasserstein, Wendy (2006). Elements of Style: A Novel (First ed.). New York: Knopf. ISBN 1-4000-4231-3.

=== Essays ===
- Wasserstein, Wendy (February 21, 2000). "Complications". The New Yorker.

=== Papers ===
The Wendy Wasserstein Papers, 1954–2006, are available to researchers at the Mount Holyoke College Archives and Special Collections. The finding aid for this collection is available online at http://asteria.fivecolleges.edu/findaids/mountholyoke/mshm325_main.html .

== Awards ==
- 1983: John Simon Guggenheim Fellowship
- 1989: Pulitzer Prize for Drama – The Heidi Chronicles
- 1989: Tony Award for Best Play – The Heidi Chronicles
- 1989: Outer Critics Circle Award – The Heidi Chronicles
- 1989: Drama Desk Award – The Heidi Chronicles
- 1989: Susan Smith Blackburn Prize – The Heidi Chronicles
- 1993: Outer Critics Circle Award – The Sisters Rosensweig
- 1993: William Inge Award for Distinguished Achievement in American Theatre
- 2006: American Theater Hall of Fame
