= Chaffey (surname) =

Chaffey is a surname. Notable people with the surname include:

- Ben Chaffey (1876–1937), Australian pastoralist, businessman and racehorse owner, son of George
- Bill Chaffey (1915–1987), Australian farmer and politician, son of Frank
- Don Chaffey (1917–1990), British film director
- Frank Chaffey (1888–1940), Australian politician, father of Bill
- George Chaffey (1848–1932), Canadian engineer, developer in California and Australia, father of Ben, brother of William
- Mark Chaffey (born 1977), Australian rules footballer
- Jamie Chaffey, Australian politician
- John Chaffey, English actor
- Pat Chaffey (born 1967), American football player
- Paul Chaffey (born 1965), Norwegian politician
- Sam Chaffey (1934–1998), New Zealand alpine skier
- William Chaffey (1856–1926), Canadian engineer, developer in California and Australia, brother of George

== See also ==
- Chaffee (surname), a list of people with the surname Chaffee or Chafee
