= Wilburton Inn =

Coordinates: 43.14719°N 73.06367°W

The Wilburton Inn is a historic hotel, restaurant, and estate located in Manchester Village, Vermont.

Built in 1902 by Albert Gilbert, a wealthy Chicago industrialist, the Wilburton was at the time the largest privately held estate in the region. James Wilbur, president of a Chicago bank, purchased the 400-acre (160 ha) estate in 1906 and named it Wilburton Hall. Wilbur was known for his research into the historical Vermont revolutionary Ira Allen as well as his generosity to the University of Vermont. When the Wilbur family's fortune declined, the farmland was sold and the mansion was leased to the Windsor Mountain School, a school for refugee children of prominent families from Nazi Europe. In 1945, Wilburton Hall became the Wilburton Inn, an exclusive resort. It was purchased in the 1970s by General Tire/ R.K.O., a conglomerate, which used the property as an executive retreat.

Albert J. Levis and Georgette Wasserstein Levis purchased the Inn in 1987 from RKO General Tire. By 1987, the estate holdings had been reduced to 25 acres (10 ha) of land. The owners are, respectively, a Greek-born retired psychiatrist, art collector, and educator and the sister of financier Bruce Wasserstein and playwright Wendy Wasserstein.

The Wilburton Inn is a Member of Historic Hotels of America. The Museum of the Creative Process, located on the estate of the Wilburton Inn, is a national center for creativity research and educational training. The inn is partnered with the Earth Sky Time Farm, an organic CSA farm and bakery operated by one of the Levis' children.
