= Roger B. Chaffee =

American astronaut and pilot (1935–1967)

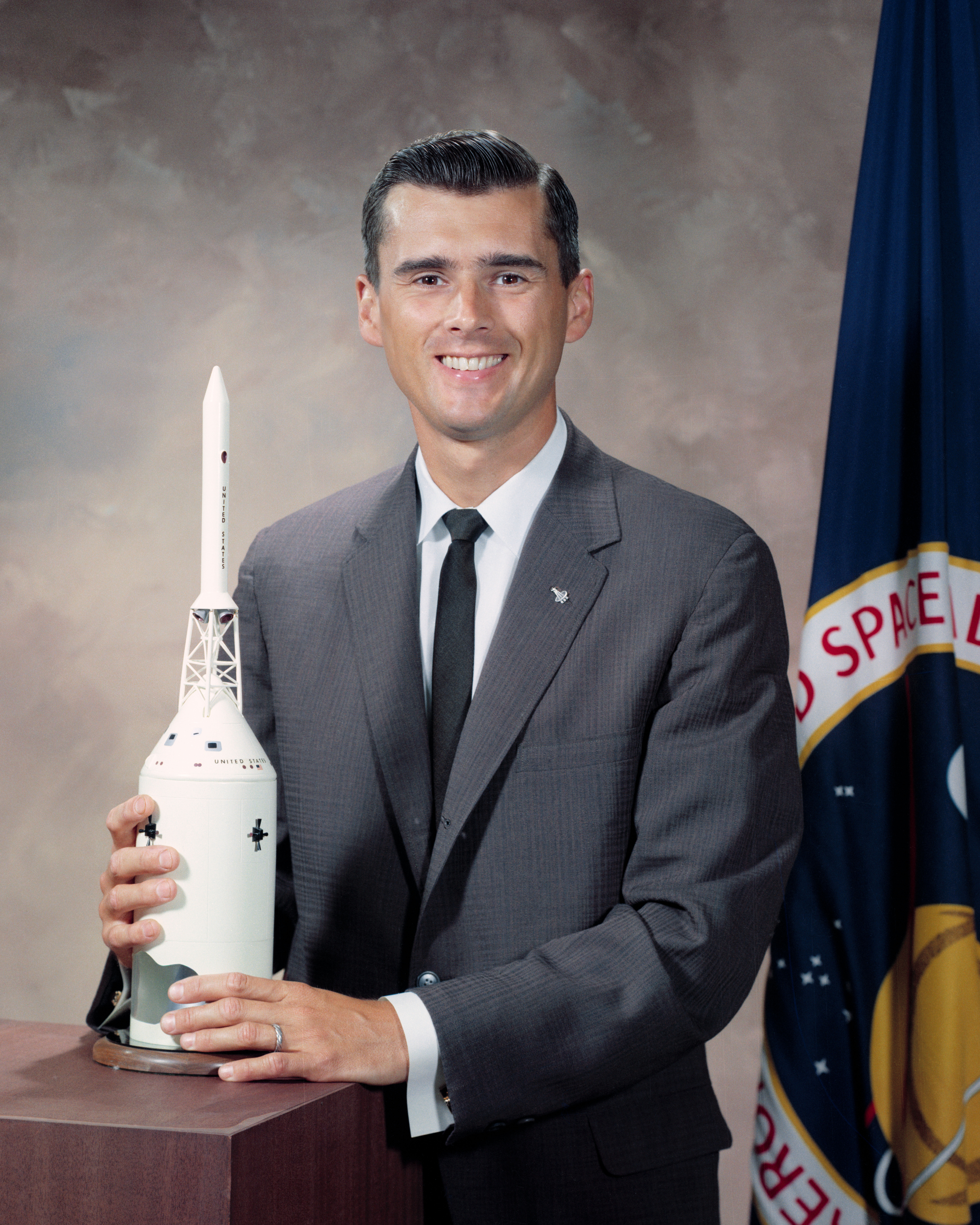
- Chaffee in 1964
- Born: Roger Bruce Chaffee; February 15, 1935; Grand Rapids, Michigan, U.S.
- Died: January 27, 1967 (aged 31); Cape Kennedy, Florida, U.S.
- Resting place: Arlington National Cemetery
- Education: Illinois Institute of Technology; Purdue University (BS); Air University
- Spouse: Martha Louise Horn (m. 1957)
- Children: 2
- Awards: Congressional Space Medal of Honor; Air Medal (2)
- Space career

NASA astronaut
- Rank: Lieutenant commander, USN
- Selection: NASA Group 3 (1963)
- Missions: Apollo 1

Roger Bruce Chaffee (/ˈtʃæfiː/; February 15, 1935 – January 27, 1967) was an American naval officer, aviator and aeronautical engineer who was a NASA astronaut in the Apollo program.

Chaffee was born in Grand Rapids, Michigan, where he became an Eagle Scout. He graduated from Central High School in 1953, and accepted a Naval Reserve Officers Training Corps (NROTC) scholarship. He began his college education at Illinois Institute of Technology, where he was involved in the fraternity Phi Kappa Sigma. He transferred to Purdue University in 1954, continuing his involvement in Phi Kappa Sigma serving as chapter president in 1956 and obtaining his private pilot's license.

After graduating from Purdue in 1957 with a Bachelor of Science degree in Aeronautical Engineering, Chaffee completed his Navy training and was commissioned as an ensign. He began pilot training at Naval Air Station Pensacola, Florida, flying aircraft such as the T-34, T-28, and A3D. He became quality and safety control officer for Heavy Photographic Squadron 62 (VAP-62). His time in this unit included taking crucial photos of Cuba during the Cuban Missile Crisis, earning him the Air Medal. He was promoted to lieutenant commander in 1966.

Along with thirteen other pilots, Chaffee was selected to be an astronaut as part of NASA Astronaut Group 3 in 1963. He served as capsule communicator (CAPCOM) for the Gemini 3 and Gemini 4 missions and received his first spaceflight assignment in 1966 as the third-ranking pilot on Apollo 1. In 1967, he died in a fire along with fellow astronauts Virgil "Gus" Grissom and Ed White during a pre-launch test for the mission at what was then the Cape Kennedy Air Force Station Launch Complex 34, Florida. He was posthumously awarded the Congressional Space Medal of Honor and a second Air Medal.

== Early life ==
Roger Bruce Chaffee was born on February 15, 1935, in Grand Rapids, Michigan, the second child of Donald Lynn Chaffee (1910–1998) and Blanche May (Mike) Chaffee (née Mosher; 1912–1996). He had an older sister, Donna, born two years earlier. In January 1935, in their hometown of Greenville, Michigan, his father was diagnosed with scarlet fever, so his mother moved in with her parents in Grand Rapids, where Roger was born. The family spent the next seven years in Greenville before moving to Grand Rapids, where his father took a job as the chief Army Ordnance inspector at the Doehler-Jarvis plant. Chaffee's interest in aerospace was sparked at a young age when his father, a former barnstorming pilot, took him on his first flight at the age of seven. Chaffee was thrilled by the flight and soon after started building model airplanes with his father.

=== Boy Scouts ===
Chaffee excelled as a Boy Scout, earning his first merit badge at the age of thirteen. He earned ten more badges that year. Many of these awards were typically earned by the older scouts. He continued his success by earning four more badges at the age of fourteen. He earned four badges for each of the next two years, almost all the badges available at the time. After becoming an Eagle Scout, he managed to earn another ten merit badges, for which he was awarded the bronze and gold palms. Between his camping trips with his family and his involvement with the Boy Scouts, Chaffee developed a passion for the outdoors.

=== Education ===
Chaffee attended the Dickinson School in Grand Rapids, and later graduated from Central High School in the top 20% of his class in 1953. Turning down a possible appointment to the United States Naval Academy at Annapolis, Maryland, he accepted a Naval Reserve Officers Training Corps (NROTC) scholarship, and in September 1953 enrolled at the Illinois Institute of Technology. He performed well, making the Dean's List and finishing with a B+ average. While enrolled, he joined Phi Kappa Sigma.

Chaffee was passionate about flying, and had a strong aptitude for science and engineering. To apply those talents, he transferred to Purdue University in the autumn of 1954 to attend the school's well-known aeronautical engineering program. Before arriving in West Lafayette, he reported for an 8-week tour on USS Wisconsin as a part of the NROTC program. To qualify, he had to finish training and pass further tests. He initially failed the eye exam, but the physician permitted him to retake it the next morning, and he passed. He was then allowed to tour on Wisconsin to England, Scotland, France, and Cuba. Upon his return to American soil, he worked as a gear cutter.

After starting classes at Purdue, Chaffee sought out a job to complement his coursework and involvement in the Phi Kappa Sigma social fraternity. His first job during his sophomore year was working as a server at one of the women's residences, but he disliked the job and sought new employment. He was hired as a draftsman at a small business near Purdue. As a junior, he was hired as a teaching assistant in the Mathematics Department to teach classes to freshman students. He was elected to the Tau Beta Pi national engineering honor society which is equivalent to Phi Beta Kappa in the non-engineering disciplines, and Sigma Gamma Tau engineering honor societies. In 1955, Chaffee took four flying lessons, but he did not have enough money to get his private pilot's license. Two years later, the NROTC sponsored flight training for him to become a naval aviator. He soloed on March 29, 1957, and obtained his private pilot's license on May 24, 1957. He earned a Bachelor of Science degree, with distinction, in aeronautical engineering at Purdue in 1957.

=== Family ===
Chaffee met his future wife Martha Louise Horn on a double-blind date in September 1955. They started dating, and he proposed to her on October 12, 1956. They married in Oklahoma City, Martha's hometown, on August 24, 1957. Martha was a homemaker. The couple had two children, Sheryl Lyn (born in 1958) and Stephen Bruce (born in 1961).

== Navy service ==
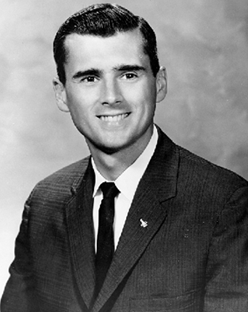
Chaffee's Astronaut selection portrait. Note the NASA insignia on the left lapel

After graduation, Chaffee completed his Navy training on August 22, 1957, and received commission as an ensign. Following his honeymoon, he was assigned to the aircraft carrier USS Lake Champlain for a six-week assignment in Norfolk with the Naval Air Force, U.S. Atlantic Fleet. By the time Chaffee arrived at the base, the ship had already left port. He temporarily worked at the base until October 1957, when he attended flight school at Naval Air Station Pensacola, Florida. He started his training by flying the T-28 and the T-34. He was posted to Naval Air Station Kingsville, Texas, from August 1958 to February 1959 as a part of Advanced Training Unit 212. In Kingsville, he trained on the F9F Cougar jet fighter. His daughter Sheryl was born the day before he left for his first aircraft carrier training. He was awarded his naval aviator wings in early 1959.

Chaffee was transferred to Naval Air Station Jacksonville, Florida, to continue his training. His first project was not flying, but repairing an A3D twin-engine jet photo reconnaissance plane. This plane was typically flown by pilots with the rank of lieutenant commander or above, but Chaffee became so familiar with the plane from repairing it he became one of the youngest pilots ever to fly it. He joined Attack Squadron 44 (VA-44) in September 1959, and from October 1959 to March 1960 he trained with Heavy Attack Squadron 3 (VAH-3).

There's only room for one mistake. You can buy the farm only once.

— Roger Chaffee

Chaffee received a variety of assignments and participated in multiple training duties over the next several years, spending most of his time in photo reconnaissance squadrons. He was stationed at NAS Jacksonville as safety officer and quality control officer for Heavy Photographic Squadron 62 (VAP-62) flying the A3D. He wrote a quality control manual for the squadron, although some of his peers saw this as too demanding. By coincidence, he was assigned to a mission where he flew over Cape Canaveral, during which aerial photographs of future launch sites were taken.

Between April 4, 1960, and October 25, 1962, including during the critical time of the Cuban Missile Crisis, Chaffee flew 82 missions over Cuba, sometimes up to three per day, and achieved over 100 flight hours each month. Some of these trips included shuttling three men per plane back and forth to Guantanamo Bay, including the pilot, co-pilot, and the photographer. Some biographies credit him with flying the U-2 plane to spy on Cuba, but this is erroneous since he was a Navy pilot and the U-2 was an Air Force plane.

After this, Chaffee undertook aircraft carrier flight training, including time spent on USS Saratoga performing both day and night flights. He said of day flying, "Setting that big bird down on the flight deck was like landing on a postage stamp"; and of night flying, "Getting catapulted off that flight deck at night is like getting shot into a bottle of ink!" While working in Jacksonville, he concurrently worked on a master's degree. He was on a cruise to Africa when his son Stephen was born in Oklahoma City.

During Chaffee's Navy service he logged more than 2,300 hours flying time, including more than 2,000 hours in jet aircraft. On February 1, 1966, he was promoted to lieutenant commander.

== NASA career ==
=== Selection ===
The world itself looks cleaner and so much more beautiful. Maybe we can make it that way—the way God intended it to be—by giving everybody that new perspective from out in space.

— Roger Chaffee

In August 1962, Chaffee confided in his family that he had submitted an application for the NASA astronaut training program, and informed his superiors of his desire to train as a test pilot for astronaut status. In mid-1962, he was accepted in the initial pool of 1,800 applicants for the third group of NASA astronauts. After his naval tour was over, and he had racked up over 1,800 hours of flying time, the Navy offered him the opportunity to continue work on his master's degree. In January 1963, he entered the U.S. Air Force Institute of Technology (AFIT) at Wright-Patterson Air Force Base in Dayton, Ohio, of Air University, to work on his Master of Science degree in reliability engineering.

While at AFIT, Chaffee continued participating in astronaut candidate testing as the pool of candidates dropped to 271 in mid-1963. It was noted during testing that he had a very small lung capacity but he used it better than most people with greater capacity. On his return from a hunting trip to Fairborn, Ohio, on October 14, 1963, he found a message from NASA in Houston, Texas. He called them back, and discovered he had been chosen as an astronaut. On October 18, 1963, it was officially announced that he was one of fourteen chosen for NASA's third group of astronauts. He said, "I was very pleased with the appointment. I've always wanted to fly and perform adventurous flying tasks all my life. Ever since the first seven Mercury astronauts were named, I've been keeping my studies up."

=== Training ===
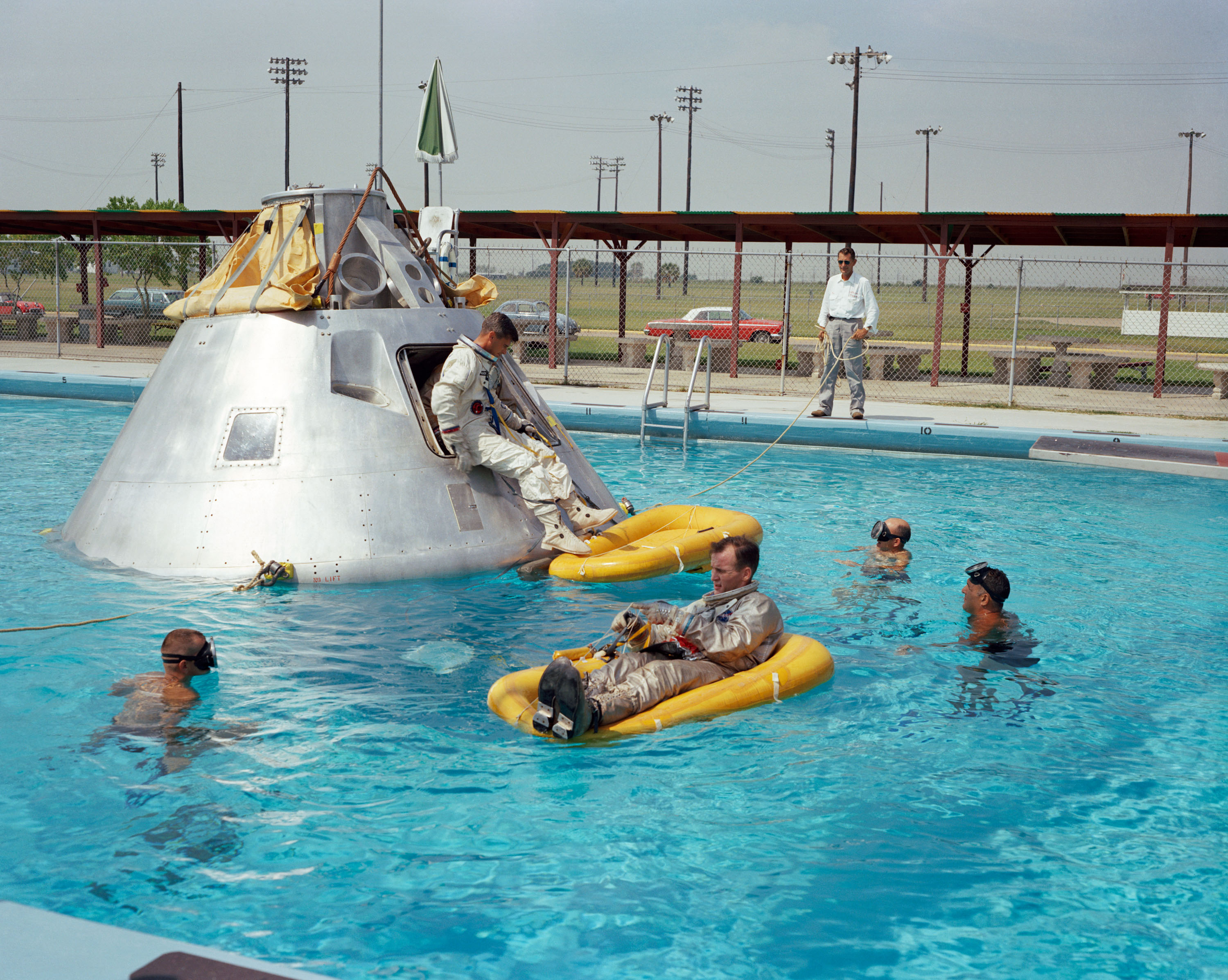
Chaffee (sitting on hatch sill) during water egress training for Apollo 1

Phase one of training for the third group of astronauts began in 1964 in lecture halls. Lectures in several fields were supplemented with trips to locations with geological significance so the astronauts gained hands-on experience. As well as piloting the spacecraft, the astronauts were to perform scientific experiments and measurements on the Moon. The astronauts traveled to the Grand Canyon to learn about geography and to Alaska, Iceland, and Hawaii to learn about rock formations and lava flows.

The second phase was contingency training, which focused on astronauts learning the skills required to survive if the landing did not occur where planned. The group started their training by being dropped off in the middle of the jungle in Panama. They performed the survival training in pairs, carrying only their parachutes and survival kits. Chaffee, with help from his Boy Scout training, foraged for enough food to survive during the three-day training mission. Following the jungle training, the astronauts traveled to an entirely different environment: the desert of Reno, Nevada. For clothing, the astronauts had only long underwear, shoes, and robes they manufactured from their parachutes. Lizards and snakes were the main source of food, and the astronauts used their parachutes as makeshift tents for shelter for the two days of desert training.

The third and final phase was operational training for the astronauts. This focused on giving them hands-on experience using the instruments and equipment required during their spaceflight. They received training in the effects of microgravity and rapid acceleration. The astronauts spent time in simulators, aboard cargo planes that simulated weightlessness, underwater to practice extravehicular activities (EVAs), and on visits to manufacturing plants to check on the progress of the hardware.

=== Project Gemini ===
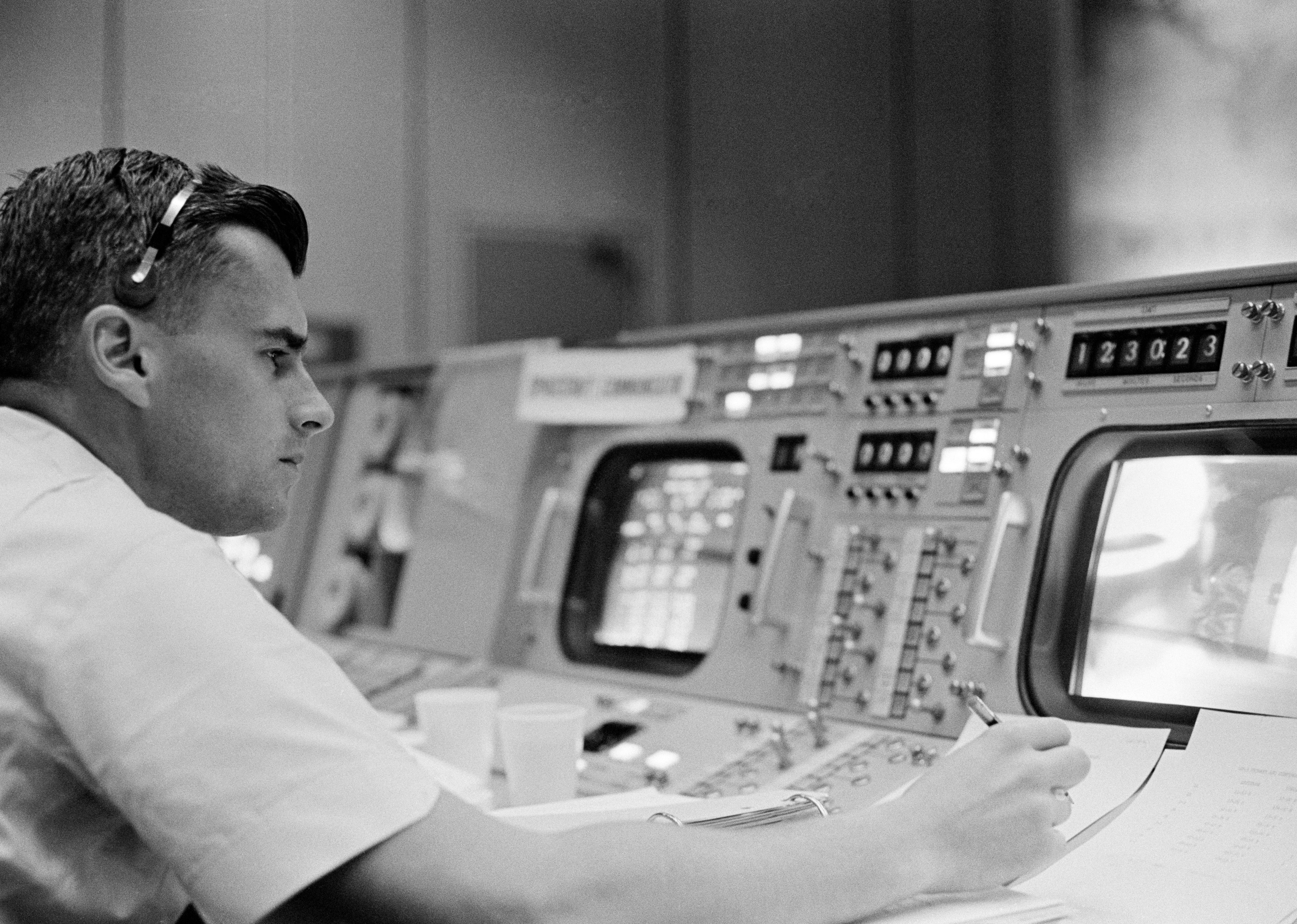
Chaffee at the consoles in Mission Control during the Gemini 3 mission

Every astronaut was required to have a specialty, and Chaffee's specialty was communications. He focused on the Deep Space Instrumentation Facility (DSIF), which the astronauts needed for navigation in space.

At the Manned Spacecraft Center in Houston, Chaffee served as capsule communicator (CAPCOM) in March 1965 for Gemini 3. Later that year, he was CAPCOM, along with Virgil "Gus" Grissom and Eugene Cernan, for the Gemini 4 mission, in which Ed White performed the first spacewalk by an American. As CAPCOM, Chaffee relayed information between the crew members and the Director of Flight Operations, Chris Kraft. He never got a seat on a Gemini mission, but was assigned to work on flight control, communications, instrumentation, and attitude and translation control systems in the Apollo program. During this time, along with Grissom, he also flew chase planes at an altitude of between 30,000 and 50,000 feet (9,100 and 15,200 m) to take motion pictures of the launch of an uncrewed Saturn 1B rocket.

=== Apollo program ===
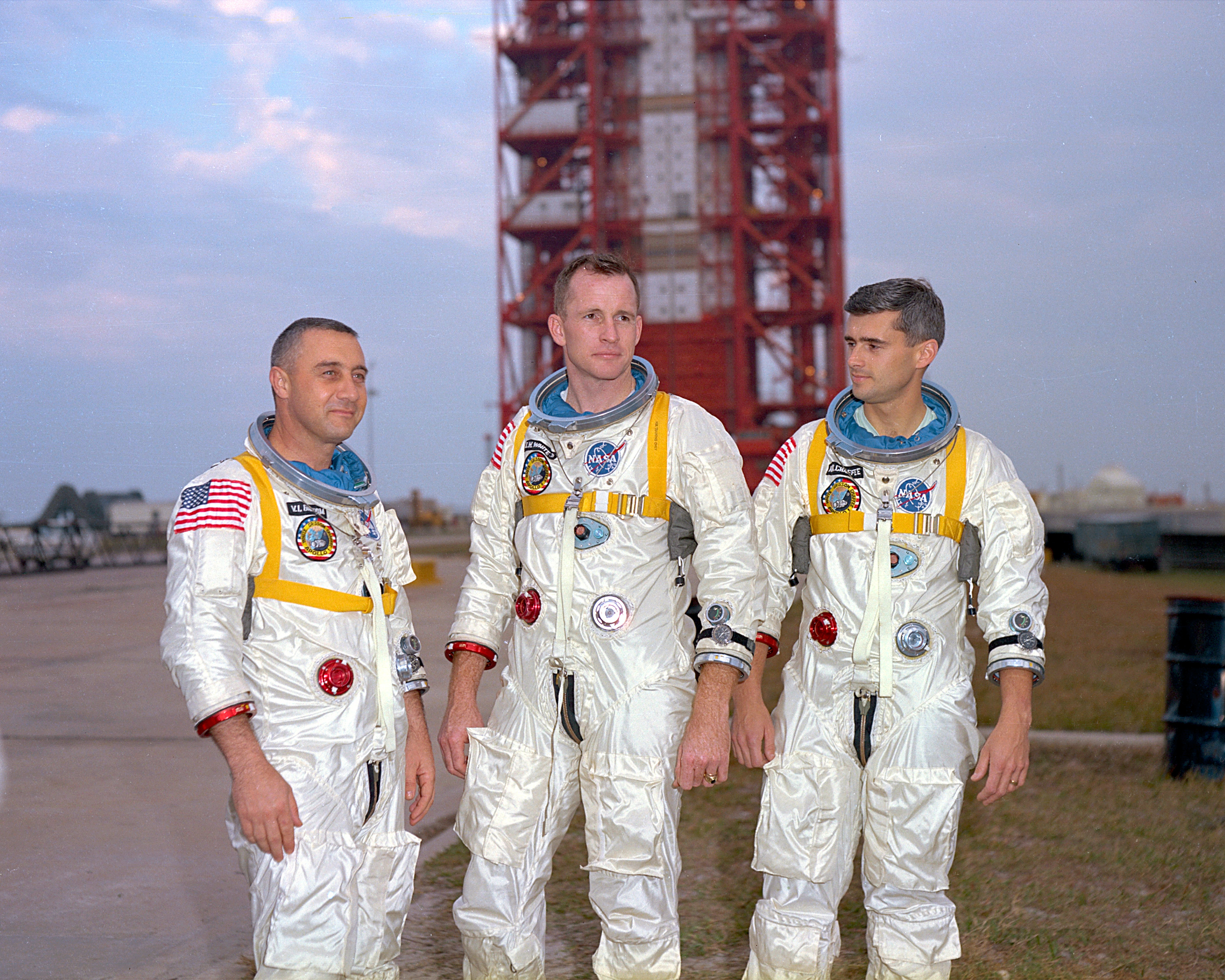
Apollo 1 crew, Grissom, White, and Chaffee

Chaffee received his first spaceflight assignment in January 1966, when he was selected for the first crewed Apollo-Saturn flight, AS-204. At the time, he was the youngest American astronaut to be selected for a mission. Joining Command Pilot Grissom and Senior Pilot White, he replaced the injured Donn F. Eisele in the third-ranked pilot position. Eisele required surgery for a dislocated shoulder, which he sustained aboard the KC-135 weightlessness training aircraft. He was reassigned to a second Apollo crew, commanded by Wally Schirra.

The crew announcement was made public on March 21, 1966. The two-week flight of Apollo 1 was to test the spacecraft systems and the control and ground tracking facilities. While Chaffee had monitored the manufacture of the Gemini spacecraft, he had not witnessed the building of the Apollo spacecraft. Three days after being selected for the Apollo 1 crew, he flew to the North American Aviation Plant in Downey, California, to see it.

Later in April, the crew traveled to Chapel Hill, North Carolina, to study stars that were programmed into their flight computer. In October, the six crewmembers planned to test the spacecraft in sea level and altitude conditions. The failure of an oxygen regulator prevented them from performing the vacuum test, but they managed to complete the sea level test. They also performed egress tests, where capsule simulators were dropped in the Gulf of Mexico under various conditions and the crew had to exit the spacecraft. The crew was able to spend time with their families at Christmas. Chaffee entered a local Christmas decoration contest and he received first prize. Four Purdue astronauts were requested to attend the Rose Bowl as guests of honor; Grissom, Gene Cernan, Neil Armstrong, and Chaffee attended the game on January 2, 1967. Progress on pre-mission activities was nearing completion; NASA announced on Monday, January 23, that February 21 was the target launch date. The primary and backup crews moved back to the Cape for the last few weeks of training. They had their own living quarters, a private waiter and chef, and gymnasium to remain fit.

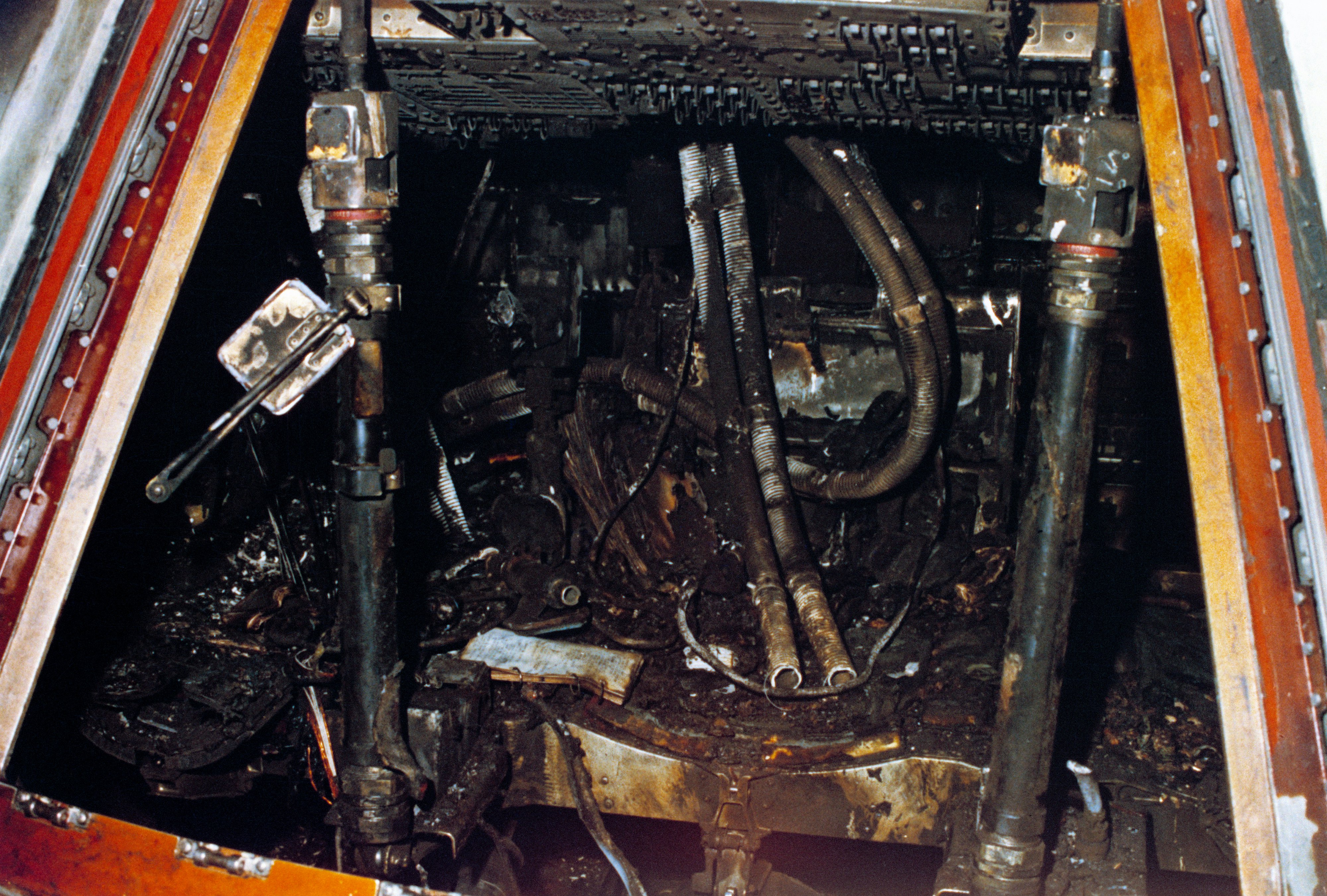
Charred remains of the Apollo 1 Command Module, in which Chaffee was killed along with Grissom and White

On Friday, January 27, Grissom, White, and Chaffee were participating in a "plugs-out" countdown demonstration test at Cape Kennedy in preparation for the planned February 21 launch. Chaffee was sitting at the right side of the cabin. His main role was to maintain communications with the blockhouse. A momentary power surge was detected at 23:30:55 GMT (6:30 pm EST), which was believed to accompany an electrical short in equipment located on the lower left side of the cabin, the presumed ignition source for the fire. At 23:31:04 GMT, a voice was heard declaring, "[We]'ve got a fire in the cockpit." Most investigative listeners believe that voice was Chaffee's.

Assigned emergency roles called for Grissom, in the left-hand seat, to open the cabin pressure vent valve, after which White in the center seat was to open the plug door hatch, while Chaffee in the right-hand seat was to maintain communications. Grissom was prevented from opening the valve by the intensity of the fire, which started in that region and spread from left to right. Despite this, White removed his restraints and apparently tried in vain to open the hatch, which was held closed by the cabin pressure. The increasing pressure finally burst the inner cabin wall on the right-hand side at 23:31:19 GMT. After approximately thirty seconds of being fed by a cabin atmosphere of pure oxygen at pressures of 16.7 to 29 psi (115 to 200 kPa), and now fed by nitrogen-buffered ambient air, the primary fire decreased in intensity and started producing large amounts of smoke, which killed the astronauts. Chaffee lost consciousness because of a lack of oxygen which sent him into cardiac arrest. He died from asphyxia due to the toxic gases from the fire, with burns contributing to his death.

Failed oxygen and ethylene glycol pipes near the fire's origin point continued burning an intense secondary fire which melted through the cabin floor. By the time firefighters were able to open the hatch, the fire had extinguished itself. The back of Chaffee's couch was found in the horizontal position, with the lower portion angled towards the floor. His helmet was closed and locked, his restraints were undone, and the hoses and electrical connections to the suit remained connected. As he was farthest from the origin of the fire, he suffered the least burn and suit damage.

=== Aftermath ===
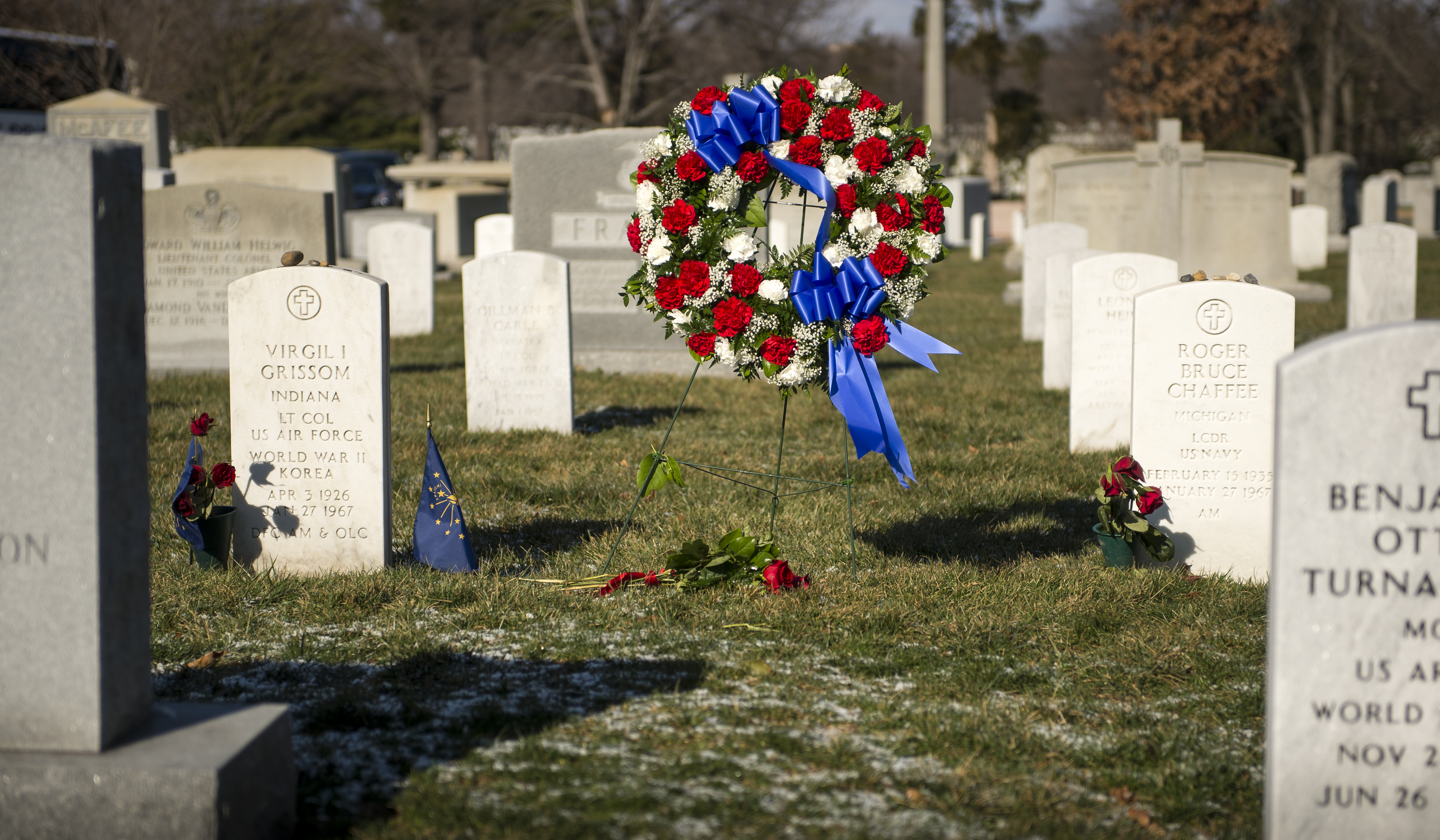
Gus Grissom's and Roger Chaffee's headstones during the NASA Day of Remembrance ceremony in 2013

Shortly after the AS-204 fire in 1967, NASA Associate Administrator for Manned Spaceflight George Mueller announced the mission would be officially designated as Apollo 1. The capsule underwent a significant redesign as a result of the disaster. The atmosphere in the cabin was changed from 100% oxygen to a 60% oxygen and 40% nitrogen environment at launch. The astronauts' spacesuits, originally made of nylon, were changed to beta cloth, a non-flammable, highly melt-resistant fabric woven from fiberglass and coated with Teflon. There were other changes, including replacing flammable cabin materials with self-extinguishing ones, and covering plumbing and wiring with protective insulation.

Chaffee and Grissom were buried in Arlington National Cemetery, while White was buried at West Point Cemetery. Chaffee's widow received $100,000 from the life insurance portion of the contract the astronauts signed with two publishing firms so they would have exclusive rights to stories and photographs of the astronauts and their families. She also received $16,250 per year for the life of the contract.

== Memorials ==
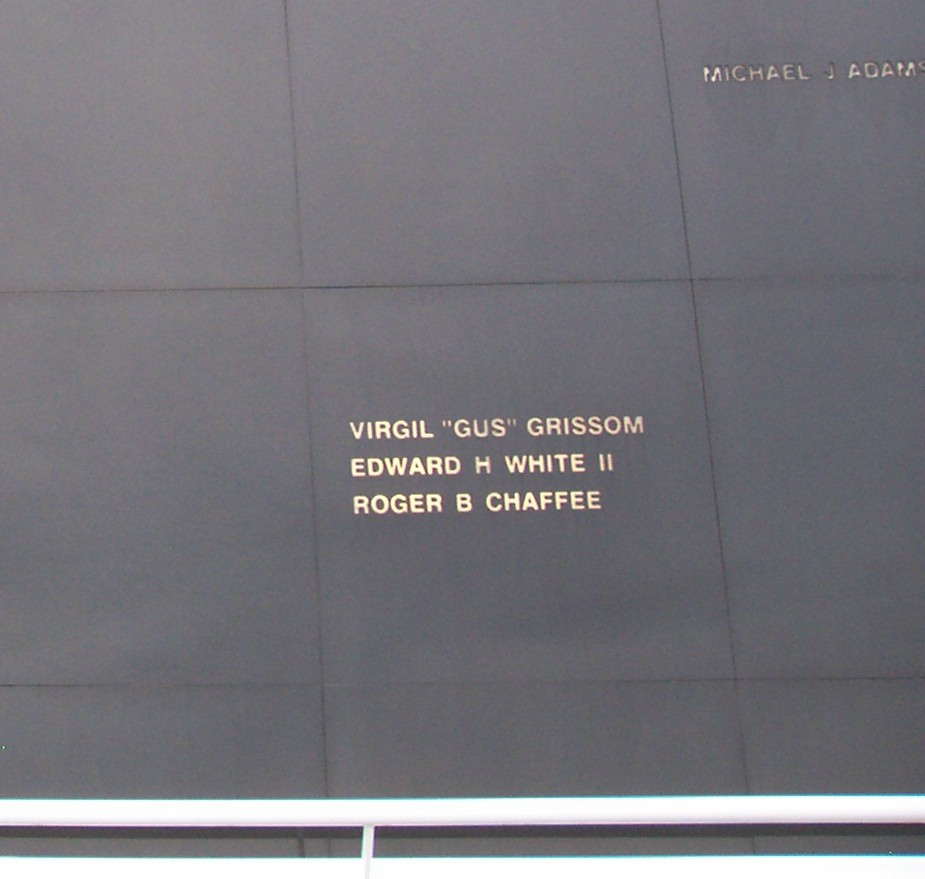
Chaffee's name, along with Grissom's and White's, on the Space Mirror Memorial

Chaffee is memorialized in many ways, from the Chaffee Crater on the far side of the Moon, to the Roger B. Chaffee Planetarium in his hometown of Grand Rapids, Michigan. When the Kent County International Airport relocated farther out in suburban Grand Rapids in 1963, the main runway of the original airport was repurposed into a major roadway and named Roger B. Chaffee Boulevard. A short distance northwest of Grand Rapids, the Gerber Scout Reservation dedicated Chaffee Bunkhouse to memorialize him. Another memorial is a hill on Mars, Chaffee Hill, 14.3 kilometres (8.9 miles) south-southwest of Columbia Memorial Station, part of the Apollo 1 Hills. Regor (Roger spelled backwards), is a seldom-used nickname for the star Gamma Velorum. Grissom used this name, plus two others for White and himself, on his Apollo 1 mission planning star charts as a joke, and the succeeding Apollo astronauts kept using the names as a memorial. A terrestrial memorial is Chaffee Island, an artificial island off Long Beach, California, created in 1966 for drilling oil (along with White, Grissom and Freeman Islands). A park in Fullerton, California, was named after Chaffee; parks were also named after his fellow Apollo 1 comrades. Chaffee is named with his Apollo 1 crewmates on the Space Mirror Memorial, which was dedicated in 1991. Chaffee's name is included on the plaque left on the Moon with the Fallen Astronaut statue in 1971 by the crew of Apollo 15.

The dismantled Launch Pad 34 at Cape Canaveral bears two memorial plaques:

They gave their lives in service to their country in the ongoing exploration of humankind's final frontier. Remember them not for how they died but for those ideals for which they lived.

In memory of those who made the ultimate sacrifice so others could reach for the stars. Ad astra per aspera (a rough road leads to the stars). God speed to the crew of Apollo 1.

The Roger B. Chaffee scholarship named for him has been awarded annually since 1967 to exceptional students in the Kent Intermediate School District for high school seniors who will be pursuing a career in math and science. Chaffee Hall, an engineering building, was dedicated to him at his alma mater, Purdue University, in 1968. Grissom High School, Ed White Middle School and Chaffee Elementary School in Huntsville, Alabama, were named for the Apollo 1 astronauts.

Roger That! is an annual event sponsored by the Grand Rapids Public Museum and Grand Valley State University that celebrates space exploration and the life of Chaffee, who was a Grand Rapids native.

== Awards and honors ==
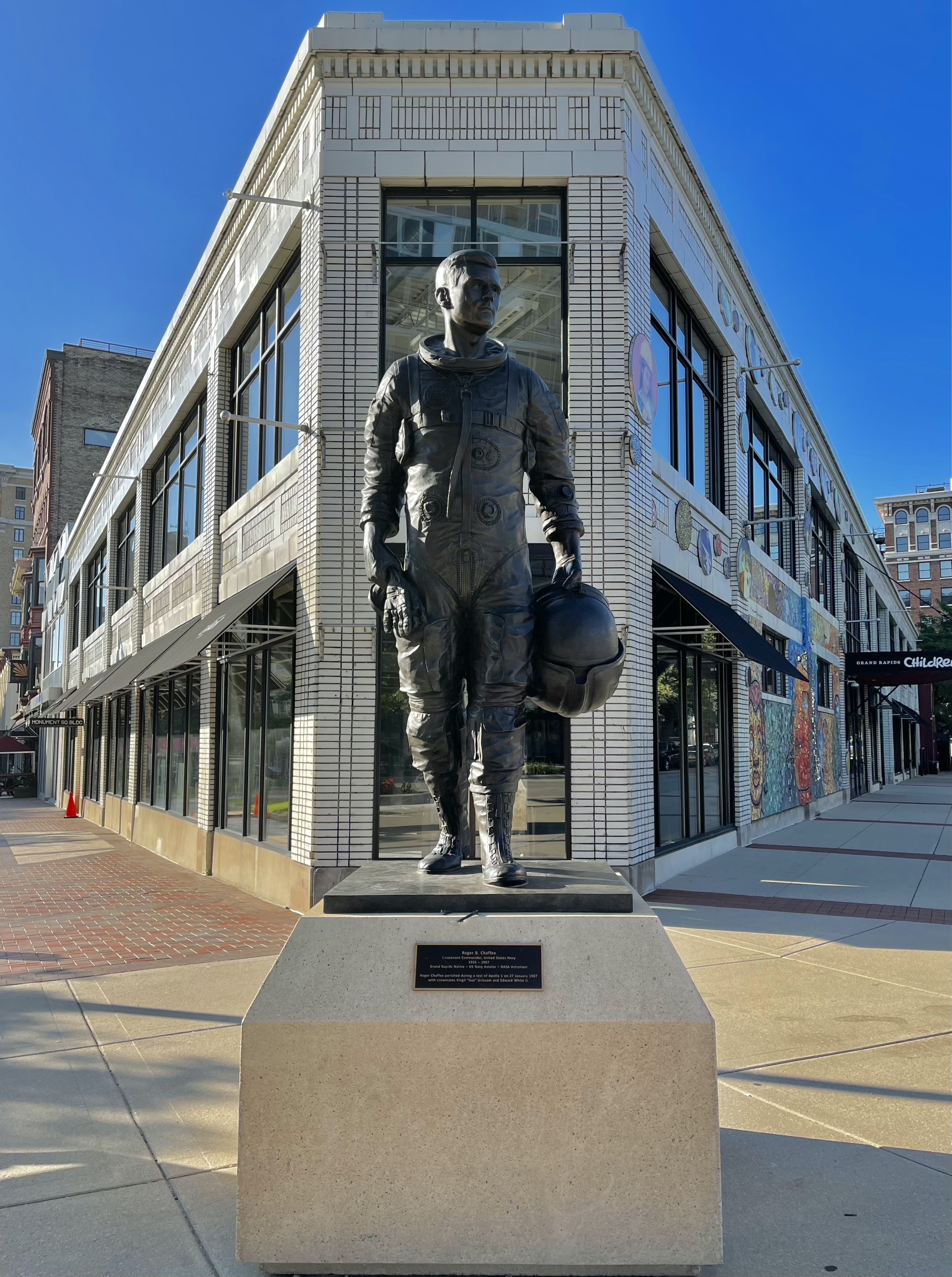
Statue of Chaffee in Grand Rapids, Michigan

Chaffee was awarded the Navy Air Medal for his involvement in Heavy Photographic Squadron 62. He completed 82 classified missions "of paramount military importance to the security of the United States". The Apollo 1 crew was awarded the NASA Distinguished Service Medal posthumously in a 1969 presentation of the Presidential Medal of Freedom to the Apollo 11 crew. He was posthumously awarded a second Air Medal. He was inducted into the International Space Hall of Fame in 1983 and into the U.S. Astronaut Hall of Fame, on October 4, 1997. Chaffee and White were awarded the Congressional Space Medal of Honor posthumously in 1997 (Grissom received the medal in 1978). He was later awarded the NASA Ambassador of Exploration Award for involvement in the U.S. space program in 2007.

On the television show Star Trek: Deep Space Nine a fictional 24th century spacecraft was named after him, designed by Doug Drexler. They named it after Chaffee as a reminder about the dangers of space exploration. Star Trek and NASA have a long history of collaborations going back to the late 1960s when the television show made its debut.

In 2018 a life-size bronze statue of Chaffee was unveiled outside the Grand Rapids Children's Museum in Chaffee's hometown. His wife, other family members, and astronaut Jack Lousma (a Grand Rapids native) were present for the event.

== See also ==
- Fallen Astronaut
- List of Eagle Scouts
- The Astronaut Monument
- List of spaceflight-related accidents and incidents
