= Swoosie Kurtz =

American actress (born 1944)

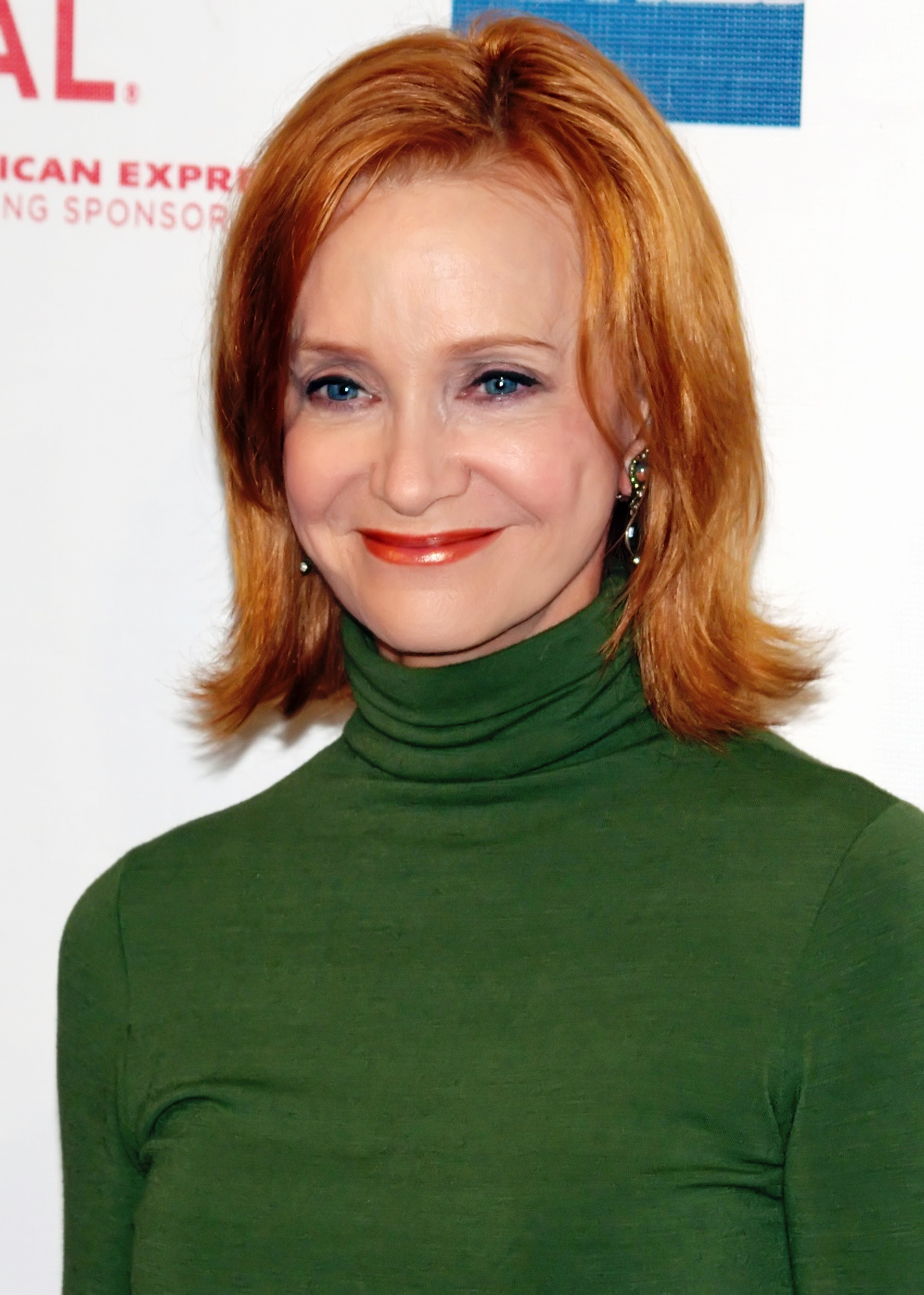
- Kurtz in 2009
- Born: September 6, 1944 (age 82); Omaha, Nebraska, U.S.
- Education: University of Southern California; London Academy of Music and Dramatic Art
- Occupation: Actress
- Years active: 1962–present
- Parent: Frank Kurtz Jr. (father)

Swoosie Kurtz (/ˈswuːsi/ SWOO-see; born September 6, 1944) is an American actress. She has won one Emmy Award and two Tony Awards.

Kurtz made her Broadway debut in the 1975 revival of Ah, Wilderness. She has received five Tony Award nominations, winning for both Fifth of July (1981) and The House of Blue Leaves (1986); her other nominations were for Tartuffe (1988), Frozen (2004), and Heartbreak House (2007).

For her television work, she has received eight Emmy Award nominations, with one win for Carol and Company in 1990. Other television credits include the NBC drama Sisters (1991–96), Huff (2004–06), Pushing Daisies (2007–09), and the hit CBS sitcom Mike & Molly (2010–16). Her films include Wildcats (1986), Dangerous Liaisons (1988), Stanley & Iris (1990), Citizen Ruth (1996), Liar Liar (1997) and Bubble Boy (2001).

== Early life ==
Kurtz was born on September 6, 1944, in Omaha, Nebraska, the only child of author Margaret "Margo" (née Rogers) and Air Force Colonel Frank Allen Kurtz Jr., a decorated World War II American bomber pilot. She got her first name "Swoosie" (which rhymes with Lucy, rather than woozy) from her father. It is derived from the B-17D Flying Fortress bomber which her father piloted during World War II, which was named "The Swoose" (half swan, half goose).

== Career ==
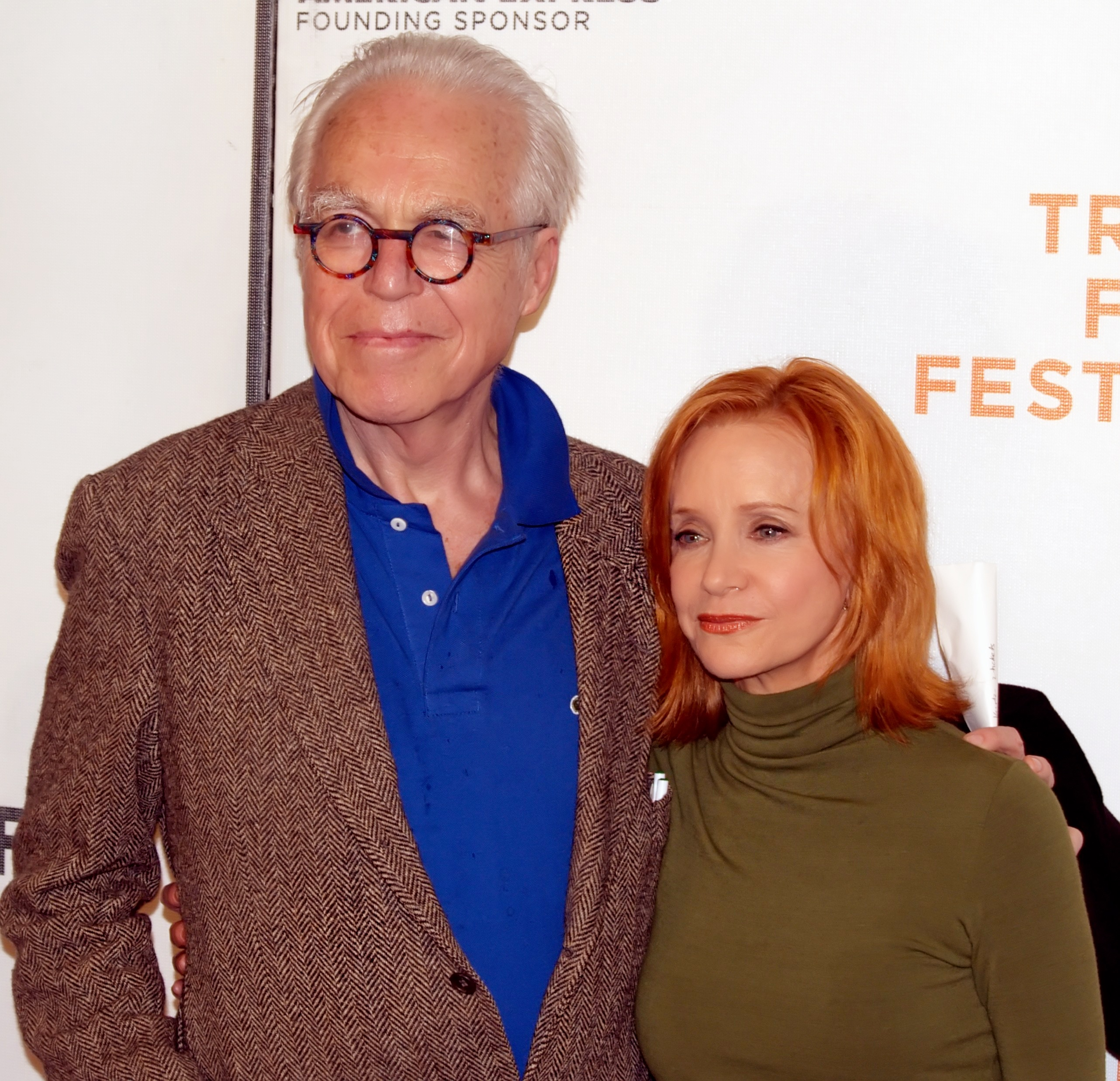
John Guare and Kurtz at the 2009 Tribeca Film Festival

Kurtz's first television appearance at age 17 was on The Donna Reed Show 4th-season episode "The Golden Trap" (February, 1962). She also appeared on To Tell the Truth at eighteen, identifying her father from two impostors. She made her debut as a series regular on the daytime drama As The World Turns in 1971. Kurtz began her career in theater, making her Broadway debut in the 1975 revival of Ah, Wilderness! She first gained wide recognition in 1978 for two theatrical productions, Uncommon Women and Others, the breakthrough play by Wendy Wasserstein in which she appeared in a 1977 workshop at the Eugene O'Neill Theater Center and then Off-Broadway, and the musical A History of the American Film for which she won a Drama Desk Award. Kurtz was soon awarded Broadway's "triple crown" (the Tony Award, Drama Desk, and Outer Critics Circle awards) for her portrayal of Gwen in Lanford Wilson's Fifth of July. She won a second Tony for her performance as Bananas in a 1986 revival of The House of Blue Leaves by John Guare. She starred as playwright Lillian Hellman in the 2002 Nora Ephron play Imaginary Friends.

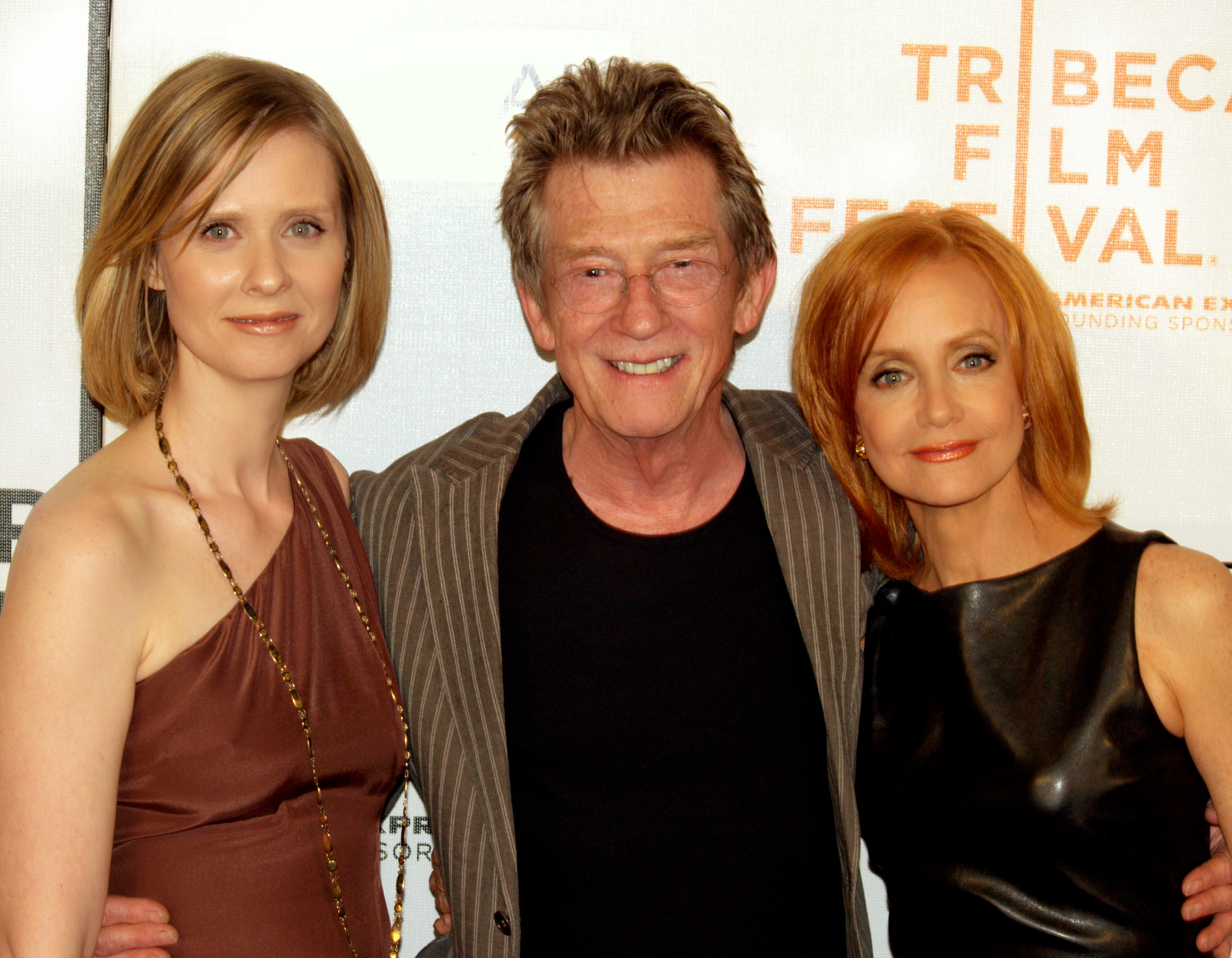
Cynthia Nixon, John Hurt, and Kurtz at the Tribeca Film Festival showing of An Englishman in New York (2009)

In 1978, Kurtz was part of the ensemble cast of Mary Tyler Moore's short-lived variety series Mary, that also included David Letterman and Michael Keaton. In 1981, Kurtz began two seasons alongside Tony Randall in the sitcom Love, Sidney, in a role that earned her the first of her 10 Emmy Award nominations. In 1990, she won her first Emmy for a guest-starring role on Carol Burnett's comedy series Carol & Company.

From 1991 to 1996, Kurtz had her longest-running television role, starring as wealthy divorcee Alex Reed Halsey on the NBC drama Sisters, a role that earned her two more Emmy Award nominations. She also starred in the ABC television series Pushing Daisies as Lily Charles.

In recent years, Kurtz has guest-starred on the hit series ER and Lost and Desperate Housewives and has also had recurring roles as Valerie on the drama That's Life, as Judy's mother Helen on the sitcom Still Standing, as Madeleine Sullivan on the Showtime drama series Huff, and most recently as part of a lesbian married couple with Blythe Danner on the drama series Nurse Jackie. In 2010, Kurtz began starring on the CBS sitcom Mike & Molly as Joyce Flynn. Kurtz has also appeared in a recurring part as Matt LeBlanc's mother in the comedy series Man with a Plan. In 2021, she began appearing as Mayim Bialik's mother in the comedy series Call Me Kat.

Although her main focus has been television, Kurtz has starred in several major Hollywood films including the Agatha Christie drama Caribbean Mystery (1983), Dangerous Liaisons (1988), its remake Cruel Intentions (1999), as a lesbian activist in the acclaimed indie film Citizen Ruth (1996), and alongside Jim Carrey in Liar Liar (1997).

== Personal life ==
From 1964 to 1970, Kurtz was romantically involved with Joshua White of The Joshua Light Show.

She is an Episcopalian and is on the Advisory Board of the Episcopal Actors Guild.

== Filmography ==
=== Film ===
Year	Title	Role	Notes
1977	Slap Shot	Shirley Upton	
1977	First Love	Marsha	
1978	Oliver's Story	Gwen Simpson	
1982	The World According to Garp	The Hooker	
1983	A Caribbean Mystery	Ruth Walter	
1984	Against All Odds	Edie	
1986	Wildcats	Verna McGrath	
1986	True Stories	Miss Rollings	
1988	Vice Versa	Lillian Brookmeyer / Turk	
1988	Bright Lights, Big City	Megan	
1988	Dangerous Liaisons	Madame de Volanges	
1990	Stanley & Iris	Sharon	
1990	A Shock to the System	Leslie Marshall	
1991	Walking the Dog	—N/a	Short film
1994	Reality Bites	Charlane McGregor	
1996	Citizen Ruth	Diane Siegler	
1996	Storybook	Queen Evilia	
1997	Liar Liar	Dana Appleton	
1998	Outside Ozona	Rosalee	
1999	Cruel Intentions	Dr. Regina Greenbaum	
1999	The White River Kid	Mummy Weed	
2001	Get Over It	Beverly Landers	
2001	Bubble Boy	Mrs. Livingston	
2002	The Rules of Attraction	Mrs. Jared	
2003	Duplex	Jean	aka Our House
2004	Sleep Easy, Hutch Rimes	Binny Redwine	
2007	Superman: Doomsday	Martha Kent	Voice
2009	An Englishman in New York	Connie Clausen	
2018	Overboard	Grace	

=== Television ===
Year	Title	Role	Notes
1962	The Donna Reed Show	Mimi	Episode: "The Golden Trap"
1971	As the World Turns	Ellie Bradley	Unknown episodes
1976	Kojak	Julie Di Nata	Episode: "Black Thorn"
1978	Mary	Skit characters	Unknown episodes
1979	Uncommon Women and Others	Rita Altabel	Unknown episodes
1979	Walking Through the Fire	Caria	TV movie
1980	Marriage is Alive and Well	Jane Tremont	TV movie
1980	The Mating Season	Roberta	TV movie
1981–83	Love, Sidney	Laurie Morgan	44 episodes Nominated—Primetime Emmy Award for Outstanding Lead Actress in a Comedy Series (1982–83)
1985	Guilty Conscience	Jackie Willis	TV movie
1985	A Time to Live	Patricia	TV movie
1987	American Playhouse	Bananas Shaughnessy / Gwen Landis	2 episodes
1987	Trying Times	Wanda	Episode: "The Visit"
1988	Baja Oklahoma	Doris Steadman	Television film Nominated—CableACE Award for Best Supporting Actress in a Movie or Miniseries; Nominated—Golden Globe Award for Best Supporting Actress – Series, Miniseries or Television Film
1990	Carol & Company	Laurie	Episode: "Reunion"; Primetime Emmy Award for Outstanding Guest Actress in a Comedy Series
1990	The Image	Joanne Winstow-Darvish	Television film Nominated—Primetime Emmy Award for Outstanding Supporting Actress in a Miniseries or a Movie
1991	Terror on Track 9	Marcia Hobbs	TV movie
1991–96	Sisters	Alex Reed Barker	Main role (127 episodes); Nominated—Primetime Emmy Award for Outstanding Lead Actress in a Drama Series (1993–94); Nominated—Screen Actors Guild Award for Outstanding Performance by a Female Actor in a Drama Series
1993	The Positively True Adventures of the Alleged Texas Cheerleader-Murdering Mom	Marla Harper	TV movie
1993	And the Band Played On	Mrs. Johnstone	Television film Nominated—CableACE Award for Best Supporting Actress in a Movie or Miniseries; Nominated—Primetime Emmy Award for Outstanding Supporting Actress in a Miniseries or a Movie
1994	One Christmas	Emily	TV movie
1995	Betrayed: A Story of Three Women	Joan Bixler	TV movie
1995	Hope and Gloria	Herself	Episode: "How to Get an Ed in Business"
1995	The Magic School Bus	Mrs. Hudson	Voice, episode: "Out of This World"
1996	Party Girl	Judy Burkhard	3 episodes
1996	A Promise to Carolyn	Kay	TV movie
1996	Harvey	Verna Simmons	TV movie
1996–97	Suddenly Susan	Liz Miller Keane	3 episodes
1997	Touched by an Angel	Libby King	Episode: "Charades"
1997	Little Girls in Pretty Boxes	Allison Bryant	TV movie
1998	ER	Tina Marie Chambliss	Episode: "Suffer the Little Children"; Nominated—Primetime Emmy Award for Outstanding Guest Actress in a Drama Series
1998	More Tales of the City	Betty Borg Ramsey	3 episodes
1998	My Own Country	Hope Flanders	TV movies
1999–2000	Love & Money	Effie Conklin	13 episodes
2000	The Outer Limits	Justice Kendall Woods	Episode: "Final Appeal"
2001	The Fighting Fitzgeralds	Martha	Episode: "When Irish Eyes Are Smilin'"
2001	The Wilde Girls	Sierra Lambert	TV movie
2001–02	That's Life	Valerie Wilkinson	4 episodes
2002	Street Time	Victoria Van Kleek	Episode: "The Truth Hurts... Bad"
2003	The Wild Thornberrys	Michelle Naidell	Voice, episode: "The Wild Snob-berry"
2004–06	Huff	Madeleine Sullivan	8 episodes Nominated—Primetime Emmy Award for Outstanding Guest Actress in a Drama Series (2005–06)
2005	Lost	Emily Annabeth Locke	Episode: "Deus Ex Machina"
2005	Still Standing	Helen Michaels	2 episodes
2005	True		TV movie
2005	Category 7: The End of the World	Penny Hall	TV movie
2005	Nadine in Date Land		TV movie
2005–14	American Dad!	Betty Smith / Marylin Thacker	Voice, 6 episodes
2007–09	Pushing Daisies	Lily Charles	15 episodes
2008	Living Proof	Elizabeth	TV movie
2009	Desperate Housewives	Jessie	Episode: "The Story of Lucy and Jessie"
2009	Heroes	Millie Houston	2 episodes
2009	Law & Order: Special Victims Unit	Judge Hilda Marsden	Episode: "Crush"
2009	Rita Rocks	Marilyn	7 episodes
2009–11	Nurse Jackie	Mrs. Scheinhorn	2 episodes
2010	Chuck	Laura Turner	Episode: "Chuck Versus the Role Models"
2010–16	Mike & Molly	Joyce Flynn	Main role (127 episodes)
2016–18	Grace and Frankie	Janet	2 episodes
2017–20	Man with a Plan	Beverly Burns	Recurring role (25 episodes)
2018	The Dangerous Book for Boys	Tiffany McKenna	6 episodes
2018	Lethal Weapon	Ruthie	2 episodes
2021–23	Call Me Kat	Sheila	Main role (53 episodes)
2021–26	Rugrats	Minka Kropotkin	Voice, recurring role
2025	It's Florida, Man	Mrs. Myrtle	Episode: "Cuckoo Girl"

== Theatre credits ==
Year	Show	Role	Notes
1968	The Firebugs	Ann	Martinique Theatre; July 1, 1968 – July 7, 1968
1970	The Effect of Gamma Rays on Man-in-the-Moon Marigolds	Janice Vickery	Mercer Arts Center; April 7, 1970 – May 14, 1972
1975	Ah, Wilderness!	Muriel McComber	Circle in the Square Theatre; September 18, 1975 – November 23, 1975
1976	Children	Jane	Stage 73; October 20, 1976
1977	Uncommon Women and Others	Rita Altabel	Marymount Manhattan Theatre; November 17, 1977 – December 4, 1977
1977	Tartuffe	Mariane	Circle in the Square Theatre; September 25, 1977 – November 20, 1977
1978	A History of the American Film	Bette	ANTA Playhouse; March 30, 1978 – April 16, 1978
1979	Wine Untouched	Unknown	Harold Clurman Theater; June 18, 1979 – June 28, 1979
1980	Fifth of July	Gwen Landis	New Apollo Theatre; November 5, 1980 – January 24, 1982
1985	The Beach House	Annie	Circle Repertory Company; December 19, 1985 – February 2, 1986
1986	The House of Blue Leaves	Bananas Shaughnessy	Vivian Beaumont Theater; April 29, 1986 – March 15, 1987
1989	Love Letters	Melissa Gardner (replacement)	Edison Theatre; November 14, 1989 – November 19, 1989
1991	Lips Together, Teeth Apart	Sally Truman	New York City Center; May 28, 1991 – January 5, 1992
1999	The Mineola Twins	Myrna/Myra	Laura Pels Theatre; February 18, 1999 – May 30, 1999
1999	The Vagina Monologues	Unknown	Westside Theatre; October 3, 1999 – January 26, 2003
2002	The Guys	Unknown	The Flea Theater; January 17, 2002 – December 20, 2002
2002	Imaginary Friends	Lillian Hellman	Ethel Barrymore Theatre; December 12, 2002 – February 16, 2003
2003	Intrigue with Faye	Woman	Acorn Theater; June 11, 2003 – July 16, 2003
2004	Frozen	Nancy	Circle in the Square Theatre; May 4, 2004 – August 22, 2004
2006	Heartbreak House	Hesione Hushabye	American Airlines Theatre; October 11, 2006 – December 17, 2006

== Awards and nominations ==
Year	Awards	Category	Work	Result
1978	Tony Awards	Best Featured Actress in a Play	Tartuffe	Nominated
1978	Drama Desk Awards	Outstanding Featured Actress in a Play	Uncommon Women and Others	Nominated
1978	Drama Desk Awards	Outstanding Featured Actress in a Musical	A History of the American Film	Won
1981	Tony Awards	Best Featured Actress in a Play	Fifth of July	Won
1981	Drama Desk Awards	Outstanding Featured Actress in a Play	Fifth of July	Won
1981	Outer Critics Circle Awards	Outstanding Actress in a Play	Fifth of July	Won
1982	Emmy Awards (Primetime)	Outstanding Lead Actress in a Comedy Series	Love, Sidney	Nominated
1983	Emmy Awards (Primetime)	Outstanding Lead Actress in a Comedy Series	Love, Sidney	Nominated
1986	Tony Awards	Best Featured Actress in a Play	The House of Blue Leaves	Won
1986	Drama Desk Awards	Outstanding Actress in a Play	The House of Blue Leaves	Nominated
1990	Emmy Awards (Primetime)	Outstanding Guest Actress in a Comedy Series	Carol and Company	Won
1993	Emmy Awards (Primetime)	Outstanding Lead Actress in a Drama Series	Sisters	Nominated
1994	Emmy Awards (Primetime)	Outstanding Lead Actress in a Drama Series	Sisters	Nominated
1994	Emmy Awards (Primetime)	Outstanding Supporting Actress in a Limited Series or Television Movie	And the Band Played On	Nominated
1998	Emmy Awards (Primetime)	Outstanding Guest Actress in a Drama Series	ER	Nominated
1999	Drama Desk Awards	Outstanding Actress in a Play	The Mineola Twins	Nominated
1999	Drama League Awards	Distinguished Performance	The Mineola Twins	Nominated
1999	Outer Critics Circle Awards	Outstanding Actress in a Play	The Mineola Twins	Nominated
2004	Tony Awards	Best Leading Actress in a Play	Frozen	Nominated
2004	Outer Critics Circle Awards	Outstanding Actress in a Play	Frozen	Nominated
2005	Emmy Awards (Primetime)	Outstanding Guest Actress in a Drama Series	Huff	Nominated
2006	Emmy Awards (Primetime)	Outstanding Guest Actress in a Drama Series	Huff	Nominated
2007	Tony Awards	Best Leading Actress in a Play	Heartbreak House	Nominated
