= Old Money (play) =

Old Money is a play written by Wendy Wasserstein. The play is "a comedy of manners, one that examines the theme of materialism."

== Production history ==
Old Money premiered in an Off-Broadway Lincoln Center production at the Mitzi Newhouse Theater on December 7, 2000 and closed on January 21, 2001. Directed by Mark Brokaw, the cast featured John Cullum, Mary Beth Hurt, Mark Harelik, Emily Bergl, and Kathryn Meisle. Choreography was by John Carrafa and original music was by Lewis Flinn. Jane Greenwood won the Lucille Lortel Award, Outstanding Costume Design.

== Plot ==
The play takes place at a party at the private house of Jeffrey Bernstein on the Upper East Side of Manhattan. It time-travels between the present-day party goers and the "Gilded Era" of the early 20th century.

== Critical response ==
New York Times critic Ben Brantley wrote that the play was " busy, frazzled" and "emphasize[s] theme and situation over character...Every so often an unexpected surge of emotional current electrifies Old Money, touching on feelings that range from the loneliness that follows the death of a family member to the anger that propels an outsider who wants in. But these eruptions subside all too quickly. What we're left with as we contemplate the lucre-worshipers of today and yesterday is a surface comparison of worlds defined by surfaces."
