= Uncommon Women and Others =

1977 play by Wendy Wasserstein

- Written by: Wendy Wasserstein
- Characters: Leilah; Rita Altabel; Kate Quin; Muffet DiNicola; Samantha Stewart; Holly Kaplan; Mrs. Plumm; Susie Friend; Carter; Narrator (voice)
- Setting: A restaurant in 1978 and Mount Holyoke College in 1972–1973

Uncommon Women and Others (1977), is the first play by noted 20th-century American playwright Wendy Wasserstein.

== Production history ==
The play was initially produced at Yale University in 1975, as Wasserstein's master's thesis.

The play premiered Off-Broadway in a production by the Phoenix Theatre on November 21, 1977, and closed on December 4, 1977, after 22 performances. It was directed by Steven Robman and performed at the Marymount Manhattan Theatre, New York.

The play was revived Off-Broadway by the Second Stage Theatre, in a production at the Lucille Lortel Theatre, running from October 26, 1994, to January 1, 1995. Directed by Carole Rothman, the cast featured Joan Buddenhagen (Leilah).

=== Characters and stage cast (1977) ===
Source: Lortel

- Meryl Streep - Leilah
- Swoosie Kurtz - Rita Altabel
- Jill Eikenberry - Kate Quin
- Ellen Parker - Muffet DiNicola
- Ann McDonough - Samantha Stewart
- Alma Cuervo - Holly Kaplan
- Josephine Nichols - Mrs. Plumm
- Cynthia Herman - Susie Friend
- Anna Levine - Carter
- Alexander Scourby - Narrator (voice)

=== Plot summary ===
Alumnae of Mount Holyoke College (Wasserstein's alma mater) meet for lunch one day in 1978 and talk about their time together in college. The play is thus a series of flashbacks to the 1972–1973 school year as seven seniors and one freshman try to "discover themselves" in the wake of second-wave feminism.

== Film ==
A made-for-television film was broadcast on the PBS Great Performances series in 1978, with all of the stage cast reprising their roles, except that Meryl Streep played Leilah.

== Critical response ==
In reviewing the 1994 revival, Jeremy Gerard wrote in Variety that the premiere of Uncommon Women and Others was "a happy matching of a new writer with a gifted director and an amazing cast, all for a play that seemed to distill the conflicts and uncertainties of its time into a memorable blend of raunchy wit and sober apprehension...a new voice in the theater had an extraordinary debut."

== Sources ==
- Wasserstein, Wendy. The Heidi Chronicles, Uncommon Women and Others, & Isn't It Romantic. New York: Vintage, 1990. ISBN 0-679-73499-6
- Wasserstein, Wendy. Uncommon Women and Others - google books
