= Ellen Parker (actress) =

American actress

- Born: September 30, 1949 (age 76); Paris, France
- Occupation: Actress
- Awards: Outstanding Supporting Actress in a Drama Series; 1993 Guiding Light

Ellen Parker (born September 30, 1949) is an American actress, best known for her role as Maureen Bauer in Guiding Light (1986-1993).

== Stage work ==
Parker is primarily a New York stage actress. Among her credits was the original production of The Heidi Chronicles, as well as Equus, David Hare's Plenty, and the play "Strangers". She also had a role in the film Kramer vs. Kramer.

== Television credits ==
Parker's first television appearance was in the PBS adaptation of another one of Wasserstein's works, Uncommon Women and Others. Her first major television role was as Ethel Kennedy in the miniseries Kennedy in 1983. Among her other television credits are appearances on Law & Order and Law & Order: Special Victims Unit, as well as The Education of Max Bickford and Ed.

=== Guiding Light ===
Parker is perhaps best known for her role as Maureen Reardon Bauer on Guiding Light, which she played from 1986 to 1993. She replaced Ellen Dolan in the role of Maureen in 1986, and played the role for seven years. During that time, the show's tentpole character, Bert Bauer, died when actress Charita Bauer, who played Bert, died. Maureen then became the show's matriarchal figure. In 1993, then-executive producer Jill Farren Phelps made a surprising decision to kill the character of Maureen, based on lackluster responses to the character during a focus group session. Parker's performance during her character's death (Maureen died in a car accident after discovered her husband Ed had been unfaithful) earned her a Daytime Emmy Award in 1993. She subsequently returned to the show in 1997, 1998, 1999, 2004 and 2005 for flashback scenes and moments where Maureen appeared as a spirit. The character's death, and Parker's departure from the show, proved controversial and unpopular.

== Personal life ==
Parker is New York City based and tends to take mostly New York-based roles. Ms. Parker is a graduate of Bard College. She and her ex- husband Dr. Mack Lipkin, a physician, have one child, a daughter, whom they adopted from China.

== Filmography ==
=== Film ===
Year	Title	Role	Notes
1979	Kramer vs. Kramer	Teacher	Feature film
1980	Night of the Juggler	Gladys	Feature film
1982	Supervisors	Fran	Short film
1986	Dream Lover	Nurse Jennifer	Feature film
1990	Desperate Hours	Kate	Feature film
1997	Ties to Rachel	Millie	Feature film
2018	The Clinic	Dr. Richards	Short film

=== Television ===
Year	Title	Role	Notes
1979	Great Performances	Muffett DiNicola	Episode: "Uncommon Women... and Others"
1982	CBS Library	Hanna	Episode: "Robbers, Rooftops and Witches"
1983	Kennedy	Ethel Kennedy	TV miniseries (3-part)
1984	Bay City Blues	Andrea Stern	Episode: "Look Homeward, Hayward"
1985	Another World	Le Soleil (voice only)	Episode: #5359
1986–1993, 1997, 1998, 1999, 2004, 2005	Guiding Light	Maureen Reardon Bauer #2	Daytime serial (contract 1986-1993; guest 1997, 1998, 1999, 2004 & 2005) For Daytime Emmy info, see Awards and nominations section below for details
1990	ABC Afterschool Special	Mrs. Noonan	Episode: "Stood Up!"
1994	Law & Order	Gwen Savitt	Episode: "Breeder"
1996	Lifestories: Families in Crisis	Mary Dobson	Episode: "Someone Had to Be Benny"
1997	Disney's Doug	Voice	Episode: "Doug's Secret of Success"; Episode: "Doug's Friend's Friend"; Episode: "Doug's Chubby Buddy"; Episode: "Doug: Quailman VI - The Dark Quail Saga"; Episode: "Judy, Judy, Judy"; Episode: "Doug's Dougapaloooza"; Episode: "Doug's Thanksgiving"; Episode: "Doug Gets It All"
2001	Law & Order: Special Victims Unit	Erin Blake	Episode: "Stolen"
2001	The Education of Max Bickford	Noleen Bettis	Episode: "It's Not the Wrapping, It's the Candy"
2002	Ed	Linda Fletcher	Episode: "Ends and Means"
2008	Law & Order	Judge Henrietta Lee	Episode: "Lost Boys"
2012	Blue Bloods	Mrs. Polanski	Episode: "Reagan vs. Reagan"
2014	Black Box	Lucy Dacy	Episode: "Kiss the Sky"
2014	The Leftovers	A-F Check-in Aide	Episode: "Guest"

== Awards and nominations ==
Year	Award	Work	Result	Ref
1993	Outstanding Supporting Actress in a Drama Series	Guiding Light	Won	
