= Chaffee, North Dakota =

Community in North Dakota, US

- Unincorporated community
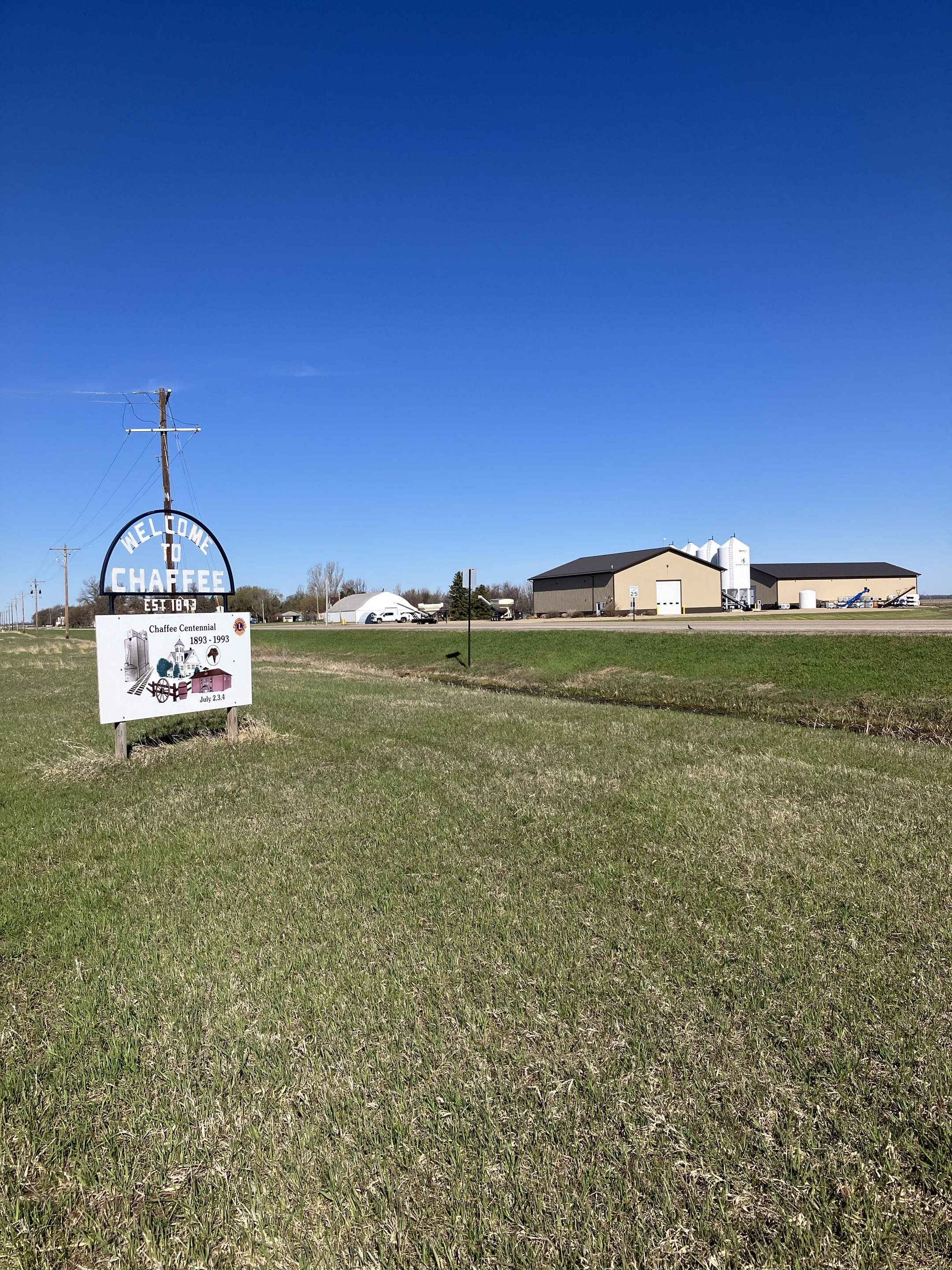

- Location within North Dakota Location within the United States
- Coordinates: 46°46′28″N 97°21′09″W
- Country: United States
- State: North Dakota
- County: Cass
- Township: Walburg
- Platted: 1898
- Elevation: 968 ft (295 m)
- Time zone: UTC-6 (Central (CST))
  - Summer (DST): UTC-5 (CDT)
- ZIP code: 58079 (Wheatland)
- Area code: 701
- GNIS feature ID: 1028331

Chaffee is an unincorporated community in Walburg Township, Cass County, North Dakota, United States.

== History ==
A post office was established at Chaffee in 1894, and remained in operation until 1966. The community, named for promoter Eben Chaffee, was platted in 1898 soon after the railroad was extended to that point.

Herbert Fuller Chaffee (Eben's son) was a first-class passenger aboard the RMS Titanic, with his wife Carrie Constance Toogood (1864–1931). She survived, but his body was never recovered.

The population was 125 in 1940.
