= Grand Rapids Public Museum =

Public museum in Grand Rapids, Michigan

- Be curious.

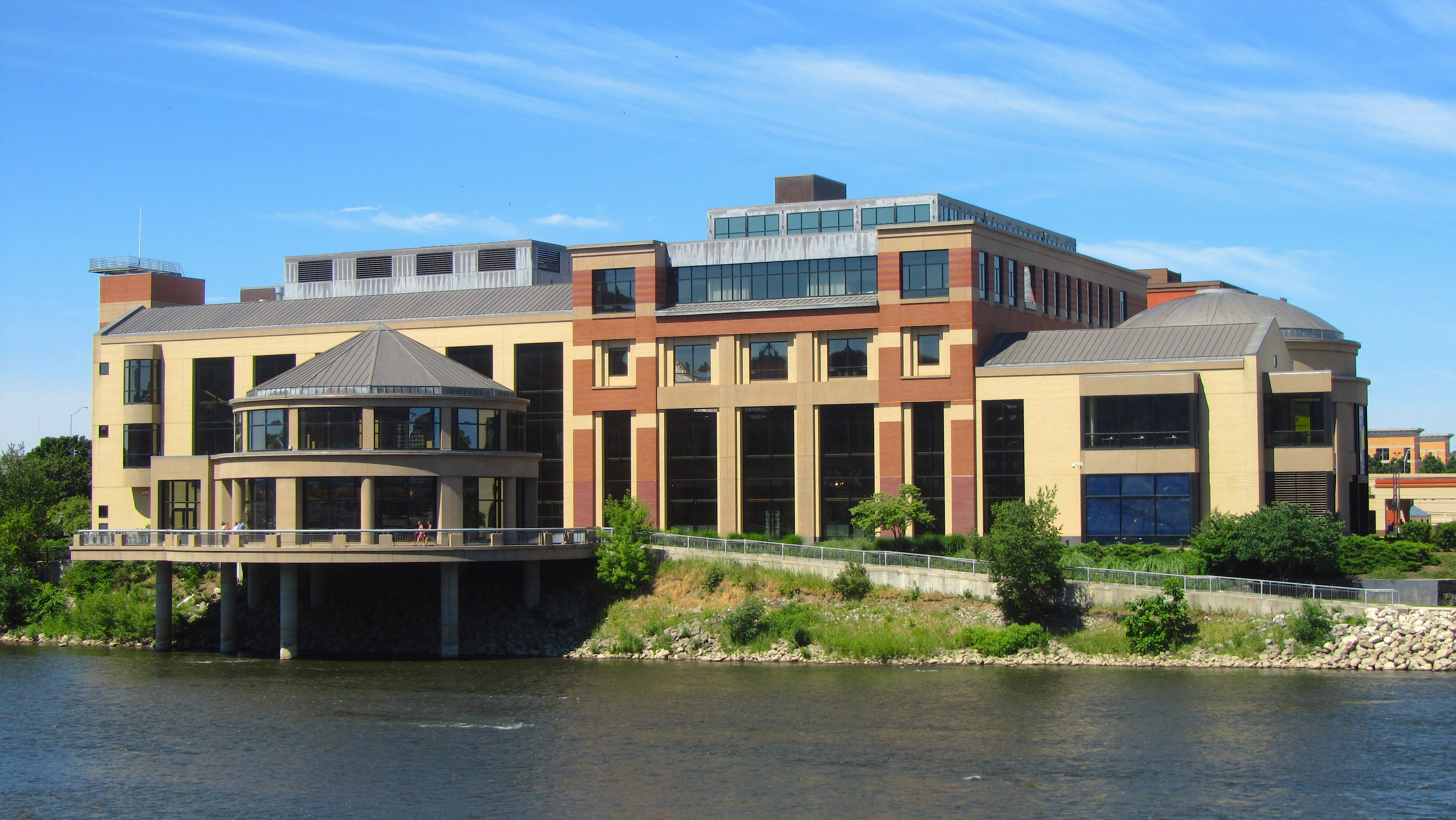
- Van Andel Museum Center
- Established: 1854
- Location: 272 Pearl Street; Grand Rapids, Michigan /
- Coordinates: 42°57′56″N 85°40′37″W
- Type: Public museum
- Accreditation: American Association of Museums
- President: Dale Robertson
- Website: www.grpm.org

The Grand Rapids Public Museum, located on the bank of the Grand River in downtown Grand Rapids, Michigan, is among the oldest history museums in the United States. It was founded in 1854 as the "Grand Rapids Lyceum of Natural History". In 1971, the Public Museum became the first museum to be accredited by the American Association of Museums.

The museum includes a cafe, a gift shop, and a 1928 Spillman carousel, which is situated in a pavilion over the Grand River. A Wurlitzer #157 Band Organ that plays 165 rolls provides the carousel's music. The Museum building also houses the Roger B. Chaffee Planetarium.

The current Pearl Street N.W. location, built in 1994, replaced the former Art Deco location on Jefferson Avenue S.E.; that building now serves as a high school and is connected to the GRPM's Community Archives and Research Center (CARC) and the City of Grand Rapids Archives.

The GRPM brings in a variety of traveling exhibitions annually ranging among topics related to science, history and culture.

== Core exhibits ==
- Anishinabek: The People of This Place
  - The story of the Native American culture of West Michigan
- Collecting A through Z
  - This alphabet-linked exhibit provides a means to bring out artifacts from many of the museum's collections e.g. "D is for Dolls"
- Newcomers: The People of This Place
  - Showcases the variety of ethnic groups that have contributed their unique imprints to the greater Grand Rapids community.
- Play Ball! The World's Largest Collection of Detroit Tiger's Autographed Baseballs
  - Features nearly 1,200 autographed baseballs and 119 years of Detroit Tigers baseball history.
- The Streets of Old Grand Rapids
  - 1890s-era 3/4 scale recreation of an allegorical Grand Rapids business district. Features businesses such as the Van Dort Print Shop, the Rudell Drug Store, the Voigt Herpolsheimer Department Store, and a Fire Station.
- West Michigan Habitats
  - A look at both the ecosystems of Western Michigan along with the history of the museum as an interpreter of the natural world. Features large scale dioramas and a mounted skeleton of a Mastodon

== Voigt House Victorian Museum ==
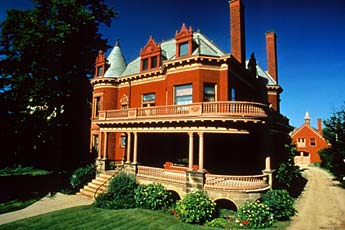
Voigt House Victorian Museum

The museum also maintains the Voigt House Victorian Home, located at 115 College Ave. SE. The Voigt House, built in 1896, was the residence of the Carl Voigt family for over 76 years. Donated to the Grand Rapids Foundation upon the death of the youngest child Ralph Voigt in 1971, the property came into the eventual possession of the museum in 1974. The Voigt house is a time capsule to the late Victorian era, having never been remodeled by the family since 1907.

The Voigt House has been closed to the public since 2009.
