= Albert J. Levis =

Greek-American psychiatrist and author

Albert J. Levis (born 1937) is a Greek-American psychiatrist and author of the Formal Theory of Behavior. He is also the founder and director of the Museum of the Creative Process in Manchester, Vermont. He along with his late wife, Georgette Wasserstein Levis, is the innkeeper of the Wilburton Inn, also in Manchester.

== Biography ==
Albert Levis was born in 1937 in Athens to a Romaniote Jewish family with deep roots in the Greek history and culture. After surviving the Holocaust in hiding, Levis continued his studies at Athens College where he graduated in 1957 and was awarded the Capps prize for an essay on the history of the Jewish diaspora as cycles of emancipation and justification for persecutions.

He studied medicine in Switzerland at the Universities of Geneva and Zurich, 1958–1963, immigrated to the United States in 1964, married Georgette Wasserstein (sister of Bruce Wasserstein) in 1966 and completed his psychiatric residence at Yale University in 1968. He settled with his family in Hamden, Connecticut, where in 1970 he founded a clinical research and training practice, the Center for the Study of Normative Behavior. There he conducted his research work and writing of books. He retired in 2002 to dedicate his attention to the Wilburton Inn, incorporated as the Art to Science project with the vision of developing a forum for his theoretical position.

Levis installed on the grounds of the inn, several permanent art exhibits identified as the Museum of the Creative Process. One of the exhibits, the Henry Gorski retrospective, is a collection of the lifetime work of Gorski. Another is the Sanctuary of the Wizard and of Wisdom. The Sculptural Trail in the History of Love retraces the evolution of religions as a progression of discoveries of improving the family institution. Levis's Holocaust memorial emphasizes the shift of paradigms from our love of stories that can mislead to the universality of the plot of stories as the scientific conflict resolution process. Many items from the museum's collections have been featured in museums and gallery exhibits around the New England region.

== Career ==
Levis is best known for his Formal Theory, an integrative approach to behavioral analysis and personality assessment. The Formal Theory of Behavior seeks to qualify the physical properties of behavior through applying principles of Physics to the study of emotional energetic transformation. Levis has published several volumes on this research, including Conflict Analysis: The Formal Theory of Behavior and Conflict Analysis Training. Levis' Conflict Analysis Training includes among other tests the Animal Metaphor Test, an integrative projective assessment.

His study of the creative process introduced the cross-disciplinary integration of psychology, religion, art and science, revamping psychology's epistemology, diagnostic categories, modes of assessment, features of morality as a science, and therapy as a concise program of emotional education. The Moral Science spiritualizes psychology, demystifies religions and reconciles them, while it popularizes psychotherapy as a mandatory education for the general public.

Levis, born to a Jewish family, was inspired to the discovery of the creative process working through his childhood experiences of WWII, the Holocaust and the Communist Civil War in the light of the wisdom of the Greek culture. He spent his career pondering on behavior and religions seeking to heal the person and the world.

He departed observing a phenomenon repeated five times in the Greek Cosmogony. He proceeded to unite conceptually behavior and morality with science and validated this theory demonstrating the scientific and moral nature of the creative process. He used art exhibits, and devised two technologies demonstrating the creative process as a scientific phenomenon: A self-assessment available online and a card game called Moral Monopoly.

His work was articulated in seven self-published volumes. They departed from a dramatic play, The Argives, continued with an overview of the Contributions of the Formal Theory, then a thorough presentation of the concepts in a textbook, simultaneously with a workbook that introduced the self-assessment; he continued with three volumes of evidence validating the theory. One book was on the museum exhibits, and two volumes on case studies. His research work is summed up with the Moral Monopoly, an educational card-game, applying the formal analysis to eight cultural stories integrating the religions of the world as a progression of scientific discoveries of the relational modalities improving the family institution and the abstraction on the nature of the divine. The game clarifies the six role structure of stories, their leading to alternative relational modalities, and points out the progression to improving resolutions promoting mutual respect as the key to the Moral Science. The game promotes the scientific analysis of the creative process as transformative.

== Publications ==
- Conflict Analysis: the Formal Theory of Behavior, outlines the principles of the Formal Theory, and develops a scientific method for understanding behavior. The textbook formulates a method of studying emotional energetic transformations with the guidance of physics, studying the dialectics of unconscious dynamics as a scientific phenomenon.
- Conflict Analysis Training is a workbook of exercises and assessments that lead towards greater self awareness and understanding. The book guides its readers to an understanding of their relational modality, how they deal with conflict, and how they can best improve.
- Science Stealing the Fire of the Gods and Healing the Worlds, published Summer 2011, explores in detail the Museum's exhibits, investigating the emotional discovery present in the Gorski Retrospective, and retracing the evolution of abstraction in religious paradigms. Based upon the myth of Prometheus stealing the fire of Olympus, the book presents science as now demystifying religion and offering humanity the tools of moral life.
- Creativity & Power Management, A Concise Program of Emotional Education I: The Clinical Delivery of the Conflict Analysis Battery: A Didactic, Diagnostic and Therapeutic Self-Assessment, published in Spring 2016, is book of clinical case studies, illustrates a new theory, the Formal Theory, and a new therapy, Creativity and Power Management, as a concise program of emotional education utilizing the Conflict Analysis Battery and the simple scientific principles of the Formal Theory .
- Creativity and Power Management, A Concise Program of Emotional Education II: The Psychoeducational Delivery of the Conflict Analysis Battery, published Fall 2016, is a book of case studies from clients that have completed the online emotional education program as well as cases from students and other-non clinical clients. The book presents a model of wellness education for the masses and a format for introducing emotional education to the classroom.
- The Moral Science Primer, published Winter 2023, sums up the theory and its multiple validations confirming psychology to be a science. The volume identifies the disciplines of psychology in its four sections: Epistemology, Diagnoses and Therapy, Assessment and Morality.
