= Grand Rapids Amateur Astronomical Association =

American astronomy group

The Grand Rapids Amateur Astronomical Association (or "GRAAA") is an astronomy group located in Grand Rapids, Michigan. It was formed in 1955 by an enthusiastic group of individuals led by businessman James C. Veen, with a love of astronomy and science. Veen initially provided a meeting place in his office, but died in an automobile accident in 1958.

The Association participates in public education activities at various metropolitan venues, comet watches, meteor observing, as well as opening their Observatory to the public two nights per month, excluding winter. Besides the public education programs, members involve themselves in many other pursuits from observing programs to astrophotography and CCD imaging.

The Association owns/ operates the Veen Observatory, located S.W. of Lowell, Michigan, situated on private land per a ninety-nine year lease granted by James M. and H. Evelyn Marron. Construction was started in 1965 and the Observatory was dedicated in 1970, originally with a 12-inch Newtonian reflector constructed by the members. The Chaffee Planetarium made considerable contribution to the building, as well as Kent County businesses and a foundation. It is the largest amateur facility in the state of Michigan, with a 16-inch (Borr), 14-inch (Marron), and 17-inch (Hawkins) telescopes, as well as smaller portable instruments including a hydrogen-alpha solar telescope.

The GRAAA is a 501(c)(3) non-profit educational and scientific organization dedicated to advancing the study of astronomy and promoting astronomy and science education. Meetings are held monthly, in the warmer months at the Veen Observatory, and at Schuler Books and Music in the city during the rest of the season.

== See also ==
- List of observatories
