= Veen Observatory =

Observatory in Michigan, US

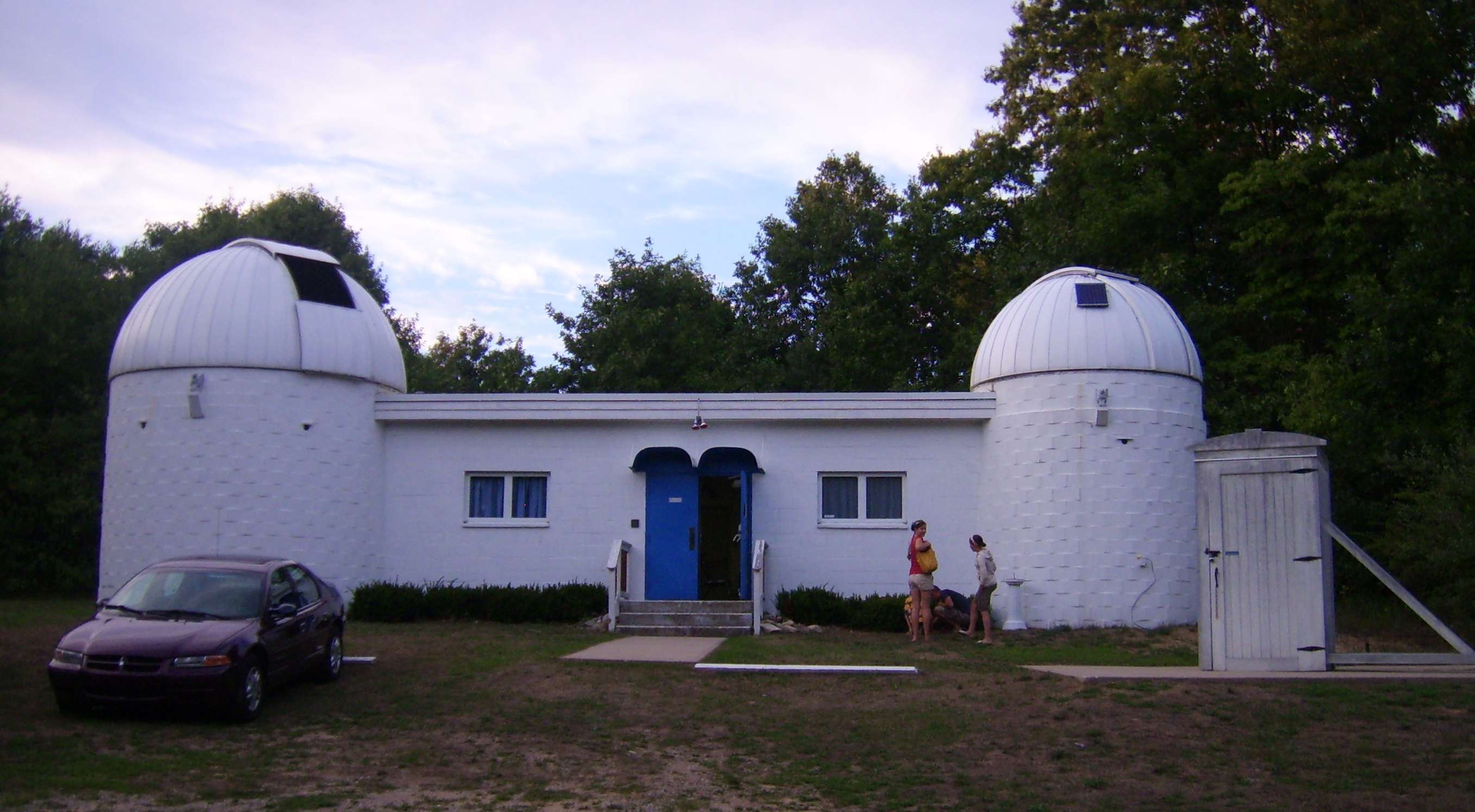
- Organization: GRAAA
- Location: Lowell, MI
- Coordinates: 42°54′16″N 85°24′13″W
- Altitude: 210 m (690 ft)
- Website: www.graaa.org/veen.html

Telescopes
- James & Evelyn Marron Telescope: 14-inch SCT
- Jeffrey Borr Telescope: 16-inch SCT
- Percy Hawkins Telescope: 17-inch reflector

The James C. Veen Observatory is an astronomical observatory owned and operated by the Grand Rapids Amateur Astronomical Association. Built during the 1960s and opened in 1970, it is located 3.6 miles west-southwest of Lowell, Michigan, United States. Its two domes house the main instruments (a Meade 16-inch LX-200 and a Celestron C-14) and a roll-off structure houses a 17-inch Dobsonian.

The Grand Rapids Amateur Astronomical Association takes pride in its James C. Veen Observatory near Lowell, Michigan, a multifaceted educational and research facility named after the co-founder and first president of the GRAAA.

The GRAAA hosts public nights at the Veen Observatory, every other Saturday evening from April through November. Members of the GRAAA can be trained for free on the various telescopes, gain key access to the observatory, and can reserve any of the scopes for observation time using the member reservation calendar.

The observatory also a large meeting room, an extensive library, and an audio-visual system for presentations to both GRAAA members and the public. In addition, the grounds of the observatory are open for members to use as an observation site using their own instruments, and walking trails are on site for daytime use by members.

== See also ==
- List of observatories
