= Chaffee, West Virginia =

Extinct town in West Virginia, US

Coordinates: 39°24′23″N 79°09′44″W

Chaffee is an extinct town in Mineral County, in the U.S. state of West Virginia. The GNIS classifies it as a populated place.

== History ==
A post office called Chaffee was established in 1883, closed in 1886, reopened in 1895, and reclosed in 1916. The town was named for Jerome B. Chaffee, a senator and railroad promoter.
