= Chaffee Art Center =

Art center in Rutland, Vermont, US

Coordinates: 43.607707°N 72.97191°W

The Chaffee Art Center for the Visual Arts is a non profit art center located in Rutland, Vermont. Operated by the Rutland Area Arts Association, the center's exhibit gallery usually displays artwork made by artists that reside in the Rutland County area.

The Center offers visual art classes for children and adults.

== History ==
The Center was founded in 1961 by the Rutland Area Arts Association. It is located in the 1896 George Chaffee House, a Queen Anne Victorian mansion called “Sunny Gables”.
