= Party of Five (2020 TV series) =

American TV series

- Genre: Teen drama; Family drama
- Created by: Amy Lippman & Christopher Keyser
- Based on: Party of Five by: Christopher Keyser; Amy Lippman
- Starring: Brandon Larracuente; Niko Guardado; Emily Tosta; Elle Paris Legaspi
- Music by: Jon Ehrlich and Jason Derlatka
- Country of origin: United States
- Original language: English
- No. of seasons: 1
- No. of episodes: 10

Production
- Executive producers: Rodrigo García; Christopher Keyser; Amy Lippman; Michal Zebede; Esta Spalding
- Producers: François Sylvestre; Maria Melograne
- Cinematography: Igor Jadue-Lillo; Carlos Gonzalez
- Editors: Matt Maddox; David Dworetzky; Jill D'Agnenica; Addison Donnell
- Running time: 41–45 minutes
- Production companies: Pamplona Productions; Mad Ben Productions; Sony Pictures Television

Original release
- Network: Freeform
- Release: January 8 – March 4, 2020

Party of Five is an American teen and family drama television series created for Freeform by Amy Lippman and Christopher Keyser, based on the 1994 Fox series of the same name. The series is produced by Sony Pictures Television, with Lippman, Keyser, and Rodrigo García serving as executive producers.

The series stars Brandon Larracuente, Emily Tosta, Niko Guardado, and Elle Paris Legaspi as four of the five Acosta children who must navigate daily struggles after their parents are deported to Mexico. By September 2017, Lippman and Keyser were developing a reboot of their television series Party of Five. The series received a put pilot commitment at Freeform in January 2018, with a pilot ordered in January 2018. Larracuente, Tosta, Guardado, and Legaspi were cast in October 2018, and the series was officially ordered by Freeform in February 2019.

Party of Five premiered on January 8, 2020, and its first season consists of 10 episodes. In April 2020, the series was canceled after one season.

== Premise ==
The series follows the five Acosta children as they navigate daily struggles after their parents are deported back to Mexico. Until they find a way to get their parents back in the country, these five kids will have to find a way to make it on their own.

== Cast and characters ==
=== Main ===
- Brandon Larracuente as Emilio Acosta, an aspiring musician and the eldest sibling of the family
- Niko Guardado as Beto Acosta, the second oldest brother of the family
- Emily Tosta as Lucia Acosta, a straight-A student and Beto's twin sibling
- Elle Paris Legaspi as Valentina Acosta, the precocious and resourceful youngest sister

=== Recurring ===
- Bruno Bichir as Javier Acosta, father of Emilio, Beto, Lucia, Valentina and Rafael
- Fernanda Urrejola as Gloria Acosta, mother of Emilio, Beto, Lucia, Valentina and Rafael
- Amanda Arcuri as Vanessa, a psychology graduate student and love interest for Emilio. She works at the restaurant as a hostess.
- Mann Alfonso as Oscar, a worker at the Acostas' restaurant
- Garcia as Matthew, an undocumented young trans man that Val and Lucia meet at church
- Rogelio Ramos as Father Jimenez
- Audrey Gerthoffer as Ella Barnett, Beto's love interest
- David Rees Snell as Jim Barnett, Ella's father
- Scott Michael Campbell as Andrew Nichols
- Sol Rodríguez as Natalia, the Acostas' new babysitter
- Elizabeth Grullon as Sully, a lesbian immigration activist and Lucia's mentor.
- Paulina Alvarez as Allison Morales

=== Guest starring ===
- Jessica Lord as Alice, a young mother
- Cristina Rosato as Dana Franzetti
- Danny Nucci as Uncle Louie, uncle of Emilio, Beto, Lucia, Valentina and Rafael
- Meagen Fay as Patty McDonald
- Lidia Porto as Inez Buendia
- Ashley Wood as Margaux Barnett, Ella's mother
- Erika Prevost as Sophie

== Episodes ==
No.	Title	Directed by	Written by	Original release date	U.S. viewers (millions)
1	"Pilot"	Rodrigo García	Michal Zebede & Amy Lippman & Christopher Keyser	January 8, 2020 (Note: The episode was first released online on January 1, 2020.)	0.442
Javier and Gloria Acosta, the owners of a restaurant in Los Angeles, are arrested by ICE and taken to a detention center due to not having proper documentation. Their children, Emilio, Beto, Lucia and Valentina, struggle to take care of each other and their baby brother Rafael while managing the restaurant. Emilio, who left home and is now in a band, barely comes around, while Beto and Lucia have trouble in school. Emilio finds out and hires a lawyer to help the family, but they are unable to prevent their parents' deportation. After Lucia throws a wild party, Emilio decides to come home and eventually run the restaurant.
2	"Margin of Error"	Rodrigo García	Amy Lippman & Christopher Keyser	January 8, 2020	0.317
The Acosta children struggle to manage without their parents. Lucia begins hanging out with others who have lost their families, alienating her friends. Beto struggles in physics class, and Lucia decides to give him the answers to his next test. When she is held up, he fails. She attempts to persuade his teacher to let him pass, but the teacher refuses. Meanwhile, Valentina prays for things to get better, and later finds a roll of cash in the house, and asks to go on a trip to Mexico to see their parents. Emilio refuses, and starts to distrust Oscar at work, as his father has noticed some money going missing after Oscar locks up. After Oscar quits over this, Gloria tells him that she was taking the money, causing Emilio to apologize to Oscar. Emilio and Vanessa hook up, while Lucia and Valentina meet Matthew, an undocumented immigrant, at the church. However, he rejects Lucia, stating she does not understand him, as he has no family.
3	"Long Distance"	Eva Vives	Amy Lippman & Christopher Keyser	January 15, 2020	0.329
Beto becomes disgusted when he discovers Emilio and Vanessa are hooking up, and tries to win her over. Valentina becomes more upset over their parents not checking in as often. An earthquake in Mexico knocks out the grid, taking out their parents' phone service and Internet, limiting communications with their children, though their father still calls the restaurant several times. Emilio discovers that the restaurant's liquor licenses is in the name of another man, who they owe money to, and ends the arrangement. Lucia tries to hire Matthew as a dishwasher after one of their employees is deported, but he is rejected for not having ID. After illegally obtaining a social security number, he is hired. Valentina skips school to check in with their parents. After a false tip is called in that ICE is coming, Emilio and Javier get in a fight over how Emilio believes other people are manipulating them, and how his father does not trust him to run the restaurant, as well as his relationship with Vanessa. After a talk with Vanessa, Emilio and Beto call Javier and Gloria respectively, Emilio telling his father that he needs some freedom to do things his way, while Beto tells his mother to be less present so Valentina will not be as dependent on her.
4	"Authentic Mexican"	Jenée LeMarque	Gabriel Llanas	January 22, 2020	0.233
Emilio and Vanessa make their relationship exclusive. The restaurant is offered to cater a party. Emilio decides to do it, despite none of his siblings agreeing. Beto changes his opinion after meeting the employers granddaughter, Ella, who he develops an attraction to. Lucia and Valentina cook together, and Lucia becomes angry when Valentina implies she is becoming like their mother, before she is forced to leave to help cater. When a mariachi band does not arrive, Emilio is forced to play music in a costume, to Lucia's disapproval. Lucia talks down a man whose car was accidentally damaged by the van she forgot to park correctly by giving him their tip, to Emilio's disapproval. Beto and Ella become closer, but after they are caught making out, her father demands Emilio fire Beto. Emilio refuses, shutting down the party, and later admits to Beto they would have made more money at the restaurant. At home Valentina calls their mother and sees that she has some relationship with the daughter of the family she is a nanny for. When Beto and Lucia return, Valentina is upset about them leaving, and Lucia admits she does not want to be like their mother. Emilio tells Vanessa he wants to one day have more than just the restaurant, and does not know if their relationship can last. Beto and Ella begin a relationship.
5	"Rafa"	Patricia Cardoso	Michal Zebede	January 29, 2020	0.239
Emilio gives advice to Beto on his relationship with Ella, and tries to get Valentina into other activities to stop her from obsessing over their parents so much. Rafa's babysitter tells Lucia he has become a picky eater. When he gets sick and they bring him to the hospital, the staff do not attend to him immediately. Beto is obsessed with his relationship with Ella, to the point of not noticing other things in his life. When they try to have sex for the first time, he is called to the hospital after Rafa has a seizure. When he arrives, they reprimand him for not telling them Rafa has not been eating. Lucia meets the woman who sold Matthew her son's social security number, and realizes the boy was not her son. Rafa is determined to have lead poisoning, and the Acostas have the house checked. During this time, a social worker arrives, and they convince him they are taking good care of Rafa. The lead poisoning is determined to have come from the daycare, and Lucia steals the information of a man who has recently died to give to Matthew instead of that of the boy. Emilio worries that he is not a good enough parent, but Valentina consoles him, agreeing to try other activities. Ella tells her father she and Beto are in love, while the social worker tells Emilio he will be visiting the family regularly.
6	"Patch Job"	Alonso Alvarez-Barreda	Mary Angélica Molina	February 5, 2020	0.236
Following the events of the prior episode, Emilio has spent more time with Rafa, causing the restaurant to fall behind. Following Vanessa quitting her job at the restaurant, one of the applicants for her position, Natalia, is a former nanny, and is hired to watch Rafa. After the kids throw a party where a girl takes interest in Matthew, Emilio expresses worry that something will happen again. Valentina demands specific dance classes which cost a lot of money, which Emilio refuses. The sink breaks, and Lucia goes to the hardware store to find parts for it, where she sees the owner standing up for immigrants' rights. Emilio refuses to pay for Beto to treat Ella on their one month anniversary. Matthew refuses Lucia's help, while Valentina and Ella decide to sell some of her stepmother's former clothes to pay for the dance lessons, which Emilio disapproves of. His father calls, asking to know everything that has happened. On their anniversary, Beto and Ella argue over money, while Natalia quits following Emilio's paranoia, before he is forced to leave to pick up Beto after Ella ditches him. When Emilio pays for the meal, Beto has an epiphany, and he and Ella come to terms with each other in the relationship. Emilio admits to Natalia how he feels about having to take care of all the problems, and she tells him his parents must have also needed help at some point. He finally accepts help from her cousin, while Matthew confesses to Lucia that his mother wanted a girl, which is why he cannot renew his DACA status. Valentina uses a fake name at the dance class.
7	"Speak for Yourself"	Michael Medico	Mike Skerrett	February 12, 2020	0.219
Emilio finds that his band has replaced him, and tries to get in on the band's first EP deal. Lucia works for Dream for Justice, but has a tough time raising funds, so she tries to get Emilio to help her, and they set up an open mic night at the restaurant. Beto meets Ella's father, and attempts to earn his respect. He does not invite Ella to the open mic night, but she does come, and becomes drunk. Valentina finds it harder to maintain her lie about who she is when Natalia wants to see her dance. One of her friends from dance class comes by the open mic night, but Natalia covers for her. Lucia gives a passionate speech, but Emilio is unable to play a song he wrote, causing a fight between another member of his band and a customer. When the police arrive, Sully prevents Lucia from stopping them, while Beto calls Ella's father, and the band leaves without Emilio. Matthew attempts to flirt with a girl who showed interest in him, while Sully shows pride in Lucia for having reached their goal. Valentina admits to Natalia that she feels safer as Amanda, while Natalia suggests to Emilio that his time in the band is over, which he refuses to accept.
8	"Dos y Dos"	James Larkin	Gabriel Llanas & Esta Spalding	February 19, 2020	0.173
Emilio discovers Valentina is using a fake name at her dance class, and consults a priest on what to do, causing him to learn something about himself. He officially quits his band following this, as their songs no longer fit his life. After the priest talks to Valentina, she confesses her lie and is shunned by her class, blaming Emilio. When he talks to Natalia about this, he admits he doesn't feel he fits into the "Mexican" culture due to his upbringing. He later finds Valentina has run away. Following the event at the restaurant, Sully and Lucia arrange a dinner for the activists to plan their next event, where they are all revealed to be in non-exclusive relationships with each other. Lucia becomes drunk and questions this, causing Sully to ban her from the dinner. Beto tries to make an impression on Ella's mother. She approves of him and reveals Ella was once in a mental hospital. After he comes to the conclusion she tried to kill herself, he is called by Emilio. The family discovers Valentina has been detained attempting to cross the border. On the way to pick her up, Ella suggests ways to handle the situation based on her own experiences, while Sully calls Lucia and tells her their relationship will be platonic. When they arrive, Emilio allows her and the others to go to Mexico to see their parents in person, and finds inspiration for his music.
9	"Mexico"	Edward Ornelas	Amy Lippman	February 26, 2020	0.188
Emilio returns to the restaurant after dropping the others off at the border, where Oscar tells him to take a few days off. He, Ella and Natalia attempt to write love songs during this time. The others meet their parents at a hotel, and catch up, but find it difficult to communicate. Flashbacks throughout the episode reveal the struggle Javier and Gloria went through get on their feet after deportation, and that they are trying to find themselves outside of their marriage. Beto misses Ella, Lucia struggles to tell her parents about her feelings for Sully, and Valentina is crushed when she sees her mother has a close relationship with the girl she babysits. Later, the children give their wisdom from experience to their parents and a boy also trying to get to America. Ella leaves after hearing a voicemail from Beto, and Emilio and Natalia discuss the idea of love, causing him to realize he has never struggled because he never saw his parents do so. They later share an intimate moment. It is revealed that Gloria abandoned her family to follow Javier to America, and does not want to leave her life again. The next morning, the family decides to go to church, but Gloria does not want to come. A final flashback shows that she is considering separating from Javier.
10	"Diaspora"	Patricia Cardoso	Amy Lippman	March 4, 2020	0.143
Gloria blames herself for the family drifting apart. Ella arrives in Mexico to see Beto. The social worker arrives due to Valentina's arrest and asks to speak to the kids, which causes Emilio to book tickets for the kids to come home in two days. He is also forced to take a parenting class, which he storms out of. Lucia hooks up with a boy, while Gloria rejects Javier's idea to have another baby. Valentina tells her parents she wants to stay in Mexico with them. Her parents argue about this, revealing their marriage is failing, and are overheard by Ella, who tells Beto. Beto convinces his mother to allow Valentina to stay. She calls Emilio to tell him she and Rafa are staying, which devastates him, while Gloria tells Lucia she will be fine with whatever choices she makes. Lucia decides to come home early, and gets a call from Alison about another event. Emilio questions whether caring for his siblings gave him a real purpose, and he and Natalia hook up. The next morning, they find out their song was selected for an audition, and Lucia. Javier and Gloria decide to try to make their marriage work, while Beto and Valentina share an emotional farewell. Ella tells Beto she can possibly become emancipated, while Lucia admits to Matthew she is not sure who she is. Emilio and Natalia go to New York for the songwriting competition, while Valentina and Rafa return to Javier and Gloria's home in Mexico.

== Production ==
=== Development ===
In September 2017, it was reported that Christopher Keyser and Amy Lippman were developing a reboot of their 1994 Fox series Party of Five for Sony Pictures Television. In January 2018, Freeform landed the reboot with a put pilot commitment, to be written by original series creators Keyser and Lippman, alongside Michal Zebede with Rodrigo García signed on to direct and executive produce the pilot. The series follows siblings who must take care of themselves after their parents are deported back to Mexico. Freeform officially ordered the series to pilot in September 2018, and the show was officially picked up to series on February 4, 2019. On April 17, 2020, Freeform canceled the series after one season.

=== Casting ===
In October 2018, Brandon Larracuente was cast as Emilio Buendía, Emily Tosta as Lucia Buendía, Niko Guardado as Beto Buendía, and Elle Paris Legaspi as Valentina Buendía The family name was later changed from Buendía to Acosta.

=== Filming ===
Filming took place in Santa Clarita, California. Production was briefly halted in October 2019 due to the California wildfires.

== Release ==
The series premiered on January 8, 2020, and its first season consisted of 10 episodes.

== Awards ==
In 2020, Party of Five was awarded an Impact Award by the National Hispanic Media Coalition for "Outstanding Television Series".

== Reception ==
=== Critical response ===
On Rotten Tomatoes, the series has an approval rating of 97% based on 30 reviews, with an average rating of 7.47/10. The website's critical consensus states, "With a strong cast and empathetic storytelling, Party of Five's timely reinvention adds a new layer of urgency while still honoring the original series." On Metacritic, it has a weighted average score of 77 out of 100, based on 17 critics, indicating "generally favorable reviews".

=== Ratings ===
However, it was a modest performer with the audiences. The first season was one of the least watched shows on the Disney-owned networks that season. This, accompanied with a steady decline in viewership right through till the end led to the show being cancelled after only one season.

Viewership and ratings per episode of Party of Five
No.	Title	Air date	Rating (18–49)	Viewers (millions)	DVR (18–49)	DVR viewers (millions)	Total (18–49)	Total viewers (millions)
1	"Pilot"	January 8, 2020	0.2	0.442	0.1	0.210	0.3	0.652
2	"Margin of Error"	January 8, 2020	0.2	0.317	—N/a	0.229	—N/a	0.546
3	"Long Distance"	January 15, 2020	0.2	0.329	—N/a	0.160	—N/a	0.489
4	"Authentic Mexican"	January 22, 2020	0.1	0.233	0.1	0.156	0.2	0.389
5	"Rafa"	January 29, 2020	0.1	0.239	0.1	0.199	0.2	0.438
6	"Patch Job"	February 5, 2020	0.1	0.236	0.1	0.186	0.2	0.422
7	"Speak for Yourself"	February 12, 2020	0.1	0.219	0.0	0.136	0.1	0.355
8	"Dos y Dos"	February 19, 2020	0.1	0.173	—N/a	0.194	—N/a	0.367
9	"Mexico"	February 26, 2020	0.1	0.188	0.1	0.176	0.2	0.364
10	"Diaspora"	March 4, 2020	0.1	0.143	TBD	TBD	TBD	TBD
