= Michael Engler =

American director and television producer

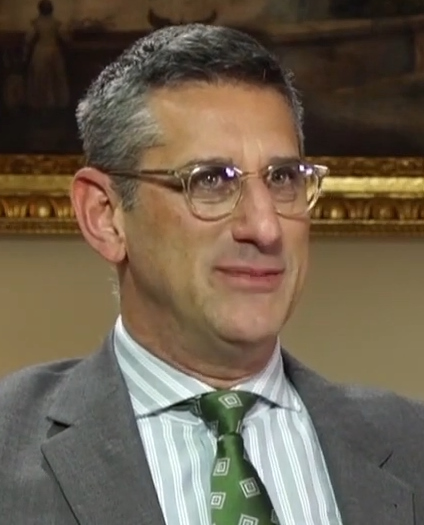
- Michael Engler in 2019
- Occupations: Director, television producer
- Years active: 1989–present

Michael Engler is an American director and television producer. Besides television, he has also worked on theatre and film.

== Theater ==
His Broadway credits include Eastern Standard, starring Dylan Baker, Patricia Clarkson, Kevin Conroy, and Anne Meara, as well as Mastergate, written by Larry Gelbart, and I Hate Hamlet, written by Paul Rudnick and starring Evan Handler and Alan Arkin.

His direction of the 2003 off-Broadway production of the Alan Bennett play Talking Heads garnered him a nomination for the Outer Critics Circle Award.

== Film and television ==
=== 1990s ===
Engler began his career in television with the TV movie Mastergate (1992) based on the play he directed by Larry Gelbart. The following year he worked on the television series Bakersfield P.D., starring Ron Eldard, Giancarlo Esposito, and Brian Doyle Murray, as well as the series Sisters, starring Swoosie Kurtz and Sela Ward.

In 1993 and 1994 Engler directed two episodes of the HBO series Dream On, created by David Crane and Marta Kauffman, and starring Brian Benben and Wendie Malick, as well as an episode of the Claire Danes starrer My So-Called Life, and began directing what would become fifteen episodes of the series Party of Five, on which he was also a producer. The series starred Neve Campbell and Jennifer Love Hewitt.

In 1995 Engler worked on the Mary Tyler Moore series New York News and Under One Roof, starring James Earl Jones, followed by the David E. Kelley series Chicago Hope in 1996, as well as the TV series Profit, starring Adrian Pasdar in 1997.

In 1998 Engler wrote and directed the short film The Victim. In the same year he worked on the short-lived series Significant Others, starring Jennifer Garner, and Cupid, starring Jeremy Piven. Engler wrapped up the 1990s with Time of Your Life, a spin-off of Party of Five. Engler served as a consulting producer on Cupid and a co-executive producer on Time of Your Life.

=== 2000s ===
Engler began the decade with the series Once and Again, starring Sela Ward, Billy Campbell, Evan Rachel Wood, and Shane West, followed by the Aaron Sorkin drama The West Wing, the HBO series Six Feet Under, starring Peter Krause and Michael C. Hall, Hidden Hills, and the series My Guide to Becoming a Rock Star starring Oliver Hudson, two episodes of Watching Ellie and an episode of Do Over.

In 2001 Engler began directing for the HBO series Sex and the City for which he would go on to earn one Emmy nomination and two Directors Guild of American nominations.

In 2004 Engler directed an episode of the series Keen Eddie, starring Mark Valley and Sienna Miller, followed by an episode of the HBO series Deadwood, starring Timothy Olyphant and Ian McShane. This was followed by Life As We Know It, which he co-executive produced, and the TV movie Twenty Questions which he also executive produced, and the series The PTA. In 2006, Engler directed the pilot episode for the USA series Psych.

In 2007 Engler directed for the series 12 Miles of Bad Road, starring Lily Tomlin, followed by the TV movies Two Families and Single with Parents, starring Beau Bridges, and the series Privileged, for which Engler served as executive producer on the pilot episode. Engler ended the decade with the TV movie Lost and Found, featuring Brian Cox.

Beginning in 2007, Engler directed eleven episodes of the NBC series 30 Rock, for which he was nominated for a Directors Guild of America Award and an Emmy for directing the episode Rosemary's Baby.

=== 2010s ===
Engler began the decade by directing two episodes of the NBC series Parenthood in 2010, and The Big C, starring Laura Linney, for which Engler was an executive producer. He followed with an episode of Go On, starring Matthew Perry, and Nashville, starring Connie Britton and Hayden Panettiere, both in 2012. In 2013 Engler directed the pilot episode for the series Welcome to the Family, starring Ricardo Chavira and Mike O'Malley.

== Filmography ==
Short film

- The Victim (1998) (Also writer)

Feature film

- The Chaperone (2018)
- Downton Abbey (2019)

TV movies

- Mastergate (1992)
- Twenty Questions (2006) (Also executive producer)
- Two Families (2007)
- Single with Parents (2008)
- Lost and Found (2009)

TV series

Year	Title	Notes
1992–1993	Sisters	"The Best Seats In The House" "Out of the Ashes" "Sleepless in Winnetka"
1993	Bakersfield P.D.	"A Bullet For Stiles"
1993–1994	Dream On	"One Ball, Two Strikes" "Blame it on Reo"
1994	My So-Called Life	"Self-Esteem"
1994–1998	Party of Five	Also executive producer "Thanksgiving" "Games People Play" "It's Not Easy Being Green" "Dearly Beloved" "Unfair Advantage" "Altered States" "Going, Going, Gone" "Personal Demons" "Desperate Measures" "I Declare" "Point of No Return" "You Win Some, You Lose Some" "What a Drag" "Positive Attitude" "Fools Rush Out"
1995	New York News	"Past Imperfect"
1995	Under One Roof	"Ronnie's Got A Gun"
1996	Chicago Hope	"Sweet Surrender"
1997	Profit	"Security"
1998	Significant Others	"The Next Big Thing" "Matters of Gravity"
1998	Cupid	Also consulting producer "Heaven... He's In Heaven" "Heart of the Matter"
1999	Time of Your Life	Also co-executive producer "The Time She Came To New York" "The Time She Got Mobbed" "The Time The Truth Was Told" "The Time They Got E-Rotic" "The Time They Cheated" "The Time They Broke The Law"
2000–2001	Once And Again	"Ozymandias 2.0" "Love's Laborer's Lost" "The Awful Truth" "Acting Out"
2001	The West Wing	"Ellie"
2001–2003	Six Feet Under	"The Trip" "In Place of Anger" "I'll Take You" "The Eye Inside"
2001–2004	Sex and the City	"Time and Punishment" "My Motherboard, Myself" "The Big Journey" "I Love a Charade" "Lights, Camera, Relationship" "Hop, Skip, and a Week" "Catch-38" "Out of the Frying Pan"
2002	My Guide to Becoming a Rock Star	"Fame" "The Road Gig" "Pay to Play"
2002	Watching Ellie	"Cheetos" "Tango"
2002	Hidden Hills	"The Mark of Manolo" "Halloween"
2002	Do Over	"Hot For Teacher"
2004	Keen Eddie	"Inciting Incident"
2004	Deadwood	"Bullock Returns to the Camp"
2004–2005	Life As We Know It	Also co-executive producer "Pilot" "Pilot Junior" "The Best Laid Plans" "A Little Problem"
2006	The PTA	
2006	Psych	"Pilot"
2007	12 Miles of Bad Road	"Pilot"
2007–2012	30 Rock	"The Baby Show" "Up All Night" "Jack Gets In The Game" "Rosemary's Baby" "Cougars" "Secrets and Lies" "Brooklyn Without Limits" "Hey, Baby, What's Wrong? Part 1" "Hey, Baby, What's Wrong? Part 2" "What Will Happen to the Gang Next Year?" "Stride of Pride"
2008	Privileged	Also executive producer (pilot only) "Pilot" "All About Honesty" "All About Insecurities" "All About Love, Actually"
2010	Parenthood	"Wassup" "The Situation"
2010–2013	The Big C	Also executive producer "Summertime" "There's No C in Team" "Everything That Rises Must Converge" "Taking the Plunge" "Losing Patients" "Musical Chairs" "Goldilocks and the Bears" "The Last Thanksgiving" "Crossing the Line" "Thin Ice" "What's Your Story?" "Vaya Con Dios" "Fly Away" "Quality of Life" "The Finale"
2012	Go On	"Do You Believe in Ghosts ... Yes!"
2012	Nashville	"Someday You'll Call My Name"
2013	Welcome to the Family	"Pilot" "Dad Finds Out" "The Big RV Adventure" "Lisette's Abuela Visits"
2014	Brooklyn Nine-Nine	"The Party"
2014	Masters of Sex	"Dirty Jobs"
2014–2016	Downton Abbey	"Episode Eight" "Episode Five" "Episode Six" "The Finale"
2015–2016	Empire	"Out, Damned Spot" "A Rose By Any Other Name"
2015–2017	Unbreakable Kimmy Schmidt	"Kimmy Goes to School" "Kimmy's Bad at Math!" "Kimmy Finds Her Mom!" "Kimmy Googles the Internet!"
2016	Notorious	"Pilot" "The Prep Talk" "Tell Me a Secret"
2016	Pure Genius	"A Bunker Hill Christmas"
2017	The Guest Book	"Story Six" "Story Eight"
2018	The Affair	"408"
2018	Splitting Up Together	"Asking For a Friend"
2022	The Gilded Age	5 episodes; Also executive producer
