= Significant Others (1998 TV series) =

American drama television series

- Genre: Drama
- Created by: Christopher Keyser; Amy Lippman
- Written by: Ellen Herman; Christopher Keyser; Amy Lippman
- Directed by: Michael Engler; George Huang; Scott Winant
- Starring: Scott Bairstow; Eion Bailey; Michael Weatherly; Jennifer Garner; Elizabeth Mitchell; Gigi Rice
- Composer: Danny Lux
- Country of origin: United States
- Original language: English
- No. of seasons: 1
- No. of episodes: 6 (1 unaired)

Production
- Executive producers: Christopher Keyser; Amy Lippman
- Producer: Paul Marks
- Cinematography: Michael Spiller
- Editors: Joanna Cappuccilli; David Dworetzky
- Running time: 60 minutes
- Production companies: Keyser/Lippman Productions; Columbia TriStar Television

Original release
- Network: Fox
- Release: March 11 – April 15, 1998

Significant Others is an American drama television series that aired on the Fox Network from March 11 to April 15, 1998. The series was created and executive produced by Christopher Keyser and Amy Lippman.

== Summary ==
The series centered on Henry Callaway, Cambell Chasen, and Nell Glennon, three twenty-something friends living in Los Angeles. Other stars included Michael Weatherly, Elizabeth Mitchell, Gigi Rice, and Richard Masur.

== Production ==
The show was first announced in the fall of 1997, and filming later began on December 4, 1997. Only five episodes were shown before cancellation, although six episodes were produced.

== Cast ==
- Scott Bairstow as Henry Callway
- Eion Bailey as Cambell Chasen
- Michael Weatherly as Ben Chasen
- Jennifer Garner as Nell Glennon
- Elizabeth Mitchell as Jane Merril-Chasen
- Gigi Rice as Charlotte
- Richard Masur as Leonard Chasen

== Episodes ==
No.	Title	Directed by	Written by	Original release date
1	"Pilot"	Scott Winant	Christopher Keyser & Amy Lippman	March 11, 1998
2	"The Next Big Thing"	Michael Engler	Christopher Keyser & Amy Lippman	March 18, 1998
3	"The Plan"	Scott Winant	Ellen Herman	March 25, 1998
4	"The Shoot"	Ken Topolsky	Christopher Keyser & Amy Lippman	April 1, 1998
5	"My Left Kidney"	George Huang	Ellen Herman	April 15, 1998
6	"Matters of Gravity"	Michael Engler	Christopher Keyser & Amy Lippman	Unaired

== Home media ==
Sony Pictures Home Entertainment released the entire series, including the unaired episode, on DVD in Region 1 in 2004 after Jennifer Garner had gained fame on the TV series Alias.
