= Time of Your Life (American TV series) =

American television drama series

- Genre: Teen drama
- Created by: Christopher Keyser; Amy Lippman
- Starring: Jennifer Love Hewitt; Jennifer Garner; Pauley Perrette; Gina Ravera; Johnathon Schaech; Diego Serrano
- Composer: Jon Ehrlich
- Country of origin: United States
- Original language: English
- No. of seasons: 1
- No. of episodes: 19 (7 unaired)

Production
- Executive producers: Christopher Keyser; Amy Lippman; Mark B. Perry; Ken Topolsky
- Producers: Darin Goldberg; Jennifer Love Hewitt; Paul Marks; Shelley Meals; Ellen S. Pressman
- Running time: 45–48 minutes
- Production companies: Keyser/Lippman Productions; Columbia TriStar Television

Original release
- Network: Fox
- Release: October 25, 1999 – June 21, 2000

Related
- Party of Five

Time of Your Life is an American teen drama television series starring Jennifer Love Hewitt that aired for one season on Fox from October 25, 1999, to June 21, 2000. A spin-off of Party of Five, the series followed Sarah Reeves Merrin as she moved to New York City to learn more about her biological parents. Co-stars included Jennifer Garner, Pauley Perrette and Gina Ravera. The series was produced by Keyser/Lippman Productions and Columbia TriStar Television.

Time of Your Life debuted on Fox on October 25, 1999, but was later put on an indefinite hiatus that ended up lasting five months due to low ratings. The series returned to Fox in June 2000 as a part of its summer schedule, but was soon officially cancelled. As a result, the series' final seven episodes remained unaired in the United States, but were later broadcast in several European countries. GetTV aired the entire series on October 28, 2021.

== Plot ==
The series centers on the new life of Hewitt's character Sarah Reeves Merrin as she moves to New York City to learn more about her biological mother's life there before she bore Sarah, while also searching for her biological father. Along the way, Sarah moves into her mother's old apartment and makes a new group of friends. Her first friend is her new roommate Romy Sullivan (Jennifer Garner), a struggling actress.

== Cast ==
- Jennifer Love Hewitt as Sarah Reeves Merrin
- Jennifer Garner as Romy Sullivan
- Pauley Perrette as Cecilia Wiznarski
- Gina Ravera as Jocelyn "Joss" House
- Johnathon Schaech as John Maguire
- Diego Serrano as Jesse Byron "J.B." Castel

== Debut and cancellation ==
Promotional advertisement

Time of Your Life first aired on October 25, 1999; it was canceled in the middle of its first season (following a five-month hiatus), on June 21, 2000. Despite Hewitt's popularity at the time, the show was not well received and had poor ratings. The original pilot for the show was completely re-shot and largely rewritten before Fox would air it.

Fox tried to save the show by putting it on a hiatus that lasted five months. Fox promoted the return of the show in June 2000 as part of its "Summer of Love," a reference to Hewitt's name. However, despite the promotion, ratings for the series' return episode remained low, and it was immediately canceled, with seven episodes remaining unaired in the United States; they were later broadcast in several European countries.

The entire series aired on October 28, 2021, on getTV.

== Episodes ==
All episode titles begin with the phrase "The Time..."

No.	Title	Directed by	Written by	Original release date
1	"The Time She Came to New York"	Michael Engler	Amy Lippman & Christopher Keyser	October 25, 1999
2	"The Time Sarah Got Her Shih-Tzu Together"	Ellen S. Pressman	Mark B. Perry	November 1, 1999
3	"The Time They Threw That Party"	Ellen S. Pressman	Mark B. Perry	November 8, 1999
4	"The Time She Got Mobbed"	Michael Engler	Ivan Menchell	November 15, 1999
5	"The Time They All Came Over for Thanksgiving"	Ellen S. Pressman	Amy Lippman & Christopher Keyser	November 22, 1999
6	"The Time the Truth Was Told"	Michael Engler	Mark B. Perry	November 29, 1999
7	"The Time They Had Not"	Steven Robman	Shelley Meals & Darin Goldberg	December 13, 1999
8	"The Time the Millennium Approached"	Robert Berlinger	Richard Greenberg	December 20, 1999
9	"The Time They Decide to Date"	Ken Topolsky	Amy Lippman & Christopher Keyser	January 10, 2000
10	"The Time She Turned 21"	Daniel Attias	Mark B. Perry	January 24, 2000
11	"The Time They Got E-Rotic"	Michael Engler	Krista Vernoff	June 14, 2000
12	"The Time Everything Changed"	Ellen S. Pressman	Amy Lippman & Christopher Keyser	June 21, 2000
13	"The Time They Were Scared of the City"	Aaron Lipstadt	Allison Robinson	October 28, 2021 (GetTV)
14	"The Time They Cheated"	Michael Engler	Mark B. Perry	October 28, 2021 (GetTV)
15	"The Time She Made a Temporary Decision"	Miguel Arteta	Amy Lippman & Christopher Keyser	October 28, 2021 (GetTV)
16	"The Time They Found a Solution"	Ellen S. Pressman	Ivan Menchell & Allison Robinson	October 28, 2021 (GetTV)
17	"The Time They Got Busy"	Daniel Attias	Darin Goldberg & Shelley Meals & Krista Vernoff	October 28, 2021 (GetTV)
18	"The Time They Broke the Law"	Michael Engler	Mark B. Perry	October 28, 2021 (GetTV)
19	"The Time He Saved the Day"	Ellen S. Pressman	Amy Lippman & Christopher Keyser	October 28, 2021 (GetTV)

== Reception ==
On Rotten Tomatoes the show's first season has an approval rating of 45% based on reviews from 11 critics.
