= Sisters (American TV series) =

American family drama television series (1991–1996)

- Genre: Family drama; Soap opera
- Created by: Ron Cowen; Daniel Lipman
- Starring: Swoosie Kurtz; Sela Ward; Patricia Kalember; Julianne Phillips; Sheila Kelley; Elizabeth Hoffman
- Composers: Jay Gruska; W. G. Snuffy Walden; David Benoit; Bennett Salvay; John Debney; Joseph Vitarelli
- Country of origin: United States
- Original language: English
- No. of seasons: 6
- No. of episodes: 127

Production
- Executive producers: Ron Cowen; Daniel Lipman; Michael Filerman; Anita W. Addison; Robert Butler
- Producers: Peter Schneider; Allison Hock; Kevin Inch
- Running time: 60 minutes
- Production companies: Cowlip Productions (seasons 2–6); Lorimar Television (1991–1993) (seasons 1–3); Warner Bros. Television (1993–1996) (seasons 4–6)

Original release
- Network: NBC
- Release: May 11, 1991 – May 4, 1996

Sisters is an American family drama television series that aired from May 11, 1991, to May 4, 1996, on NBC. The series was created by Ron Cowen and Daniel Lipman, who were also the executive producers and showrunners.

== Overview ==
Sisters focused on four very different sisters living in Winnetka, Illinois. Their recently deceased father, Thomas Reed, a doctor, had been absent and a workaholic, while their long-suffering mother, Beatrice, turned to alcoholism to cope with his neglect and affairs. Having always wanted sons, their father had called the girls by male versions of their full names: Alexandra was called Alex; Theodora, Teddy; Georgiana, Georgie; and Francesca, Frankie.

For the first two seasons, each episode began with the sisters' weekly ritual of chatting in a steam bath together, but switched to a more traditional opening sequence beginning with the 1992–1993 season: glossy, black-and-white filmed scenes of the sisters engaging in various activities during both their childhood and adult years. Initially, the only soundtrack used for the opening was the sounds of the characters, but in the fall of 1993 a piano solo composed by John Debney was added as theme music.

Most episodes of the show featured a number of flashbacks, in which the characters would interact with or simply observe their younger selves (played by younger actresses). Although the show was a drama with soap opera–style storylines, the show was also quirky and offbeat in the style of other shows at the time like CBS's Northern Exposure.

=== Season One ===
One year after her husband's death, Beatrice reluctantly sold the family home to move into a seniors' condominium building. Depressed, Beatrice relapses on alcohol and is arrested for driving under the influence. Teddy comes back into town from California to discover her ex-husband Mitch is dating her younger sister Frankie. Alex believes her husband Wade is cheating on her, but instead discovers he is a crossdresser. Bea goes to court for her DUI charge; the judge on her case, Truman Ventner, is an acquaintance of hers who also happens to live in her building. Teddy pursues Mitch and although he resists her, they eventually spend a night together; shortly afterward Mitch and Frankie (who is unaware of the encounter) announce their engagement and plan a quick wedding. Teddy breaks up their wedding drunk with a shotgun; Frankie decides not to reschedule the wedding and she and Mitch stop seeing each other. Ashamed of how her behavior is affecting the family and especially her daughter Cat, Teddy leaves Cat with Mitch and announces she will return to California alone. Georgie's son Evan is diagnosed with leukemia, and Teddy decides to stay in Winnetka.

=== Season Two ===
Georgie attempts to balance her needs with Evan's during his treatment. Alex discovers Wade has been cheating on her for six months with a former patient, and she and Wade divorce. Reed (Ashley Judd) reacts by rebelling and dropping out of school. Frankie makes a financial investment in Mitch's fish market; while filing paperwork at City Hall, they decide to elope. Teddy discovers she is pregnant with Mitch's baby following their earlier brief encounter; she tells the family that she became pregnant after a one-night stand. Mitch eventually finds out the truth, but Frankie never does. Truman and Beatrice begin a relationship. Teddy begins a job doing window dressing at a fashion boutique, then suffers a miscarriage. Alex begins dating her plumber, Victor, while Wade tries to win her back. After Evan's favorite teacher is dismissed for being HIV-positive, Georgie runs for the school board, but narrowly loses. Teddy is let go from the fashion boutique, embarks on a brief career as a "Wonderful You" makeup saleslady, and begins her clothing design career when during an (unsuccessful) makeup sales party, Alex's socialite friends notice Teddy's hand-painted blouse and demand to order blouses of their own. Alex and Wade decide to reconcile. Frankie discovers she cannot carry a child; following a failed adoption, she asks Georgie to be a surrogate mother for her baby.

=== Season Three ===
Alex plans an elaborate ceremony and reception at her house for Truman and Beatrice's wedding, but they decide to elope; Reed and Kirby (Paul Rudd) are married there instead. Georgie gives birth to Frankie's son Thomas George after a car accident; Georgie has difficulty seeing him as her sister's child. Alex and Teddy feud due to Alex's jealousy of Teddy's newfound success as a clothing designer. Simon Bolt (Mark Frankel) invests in Teddy's fashion design company but later sells it to a Texan investor without consulting Teddy. Teddy walks away from her company when the new owner does not respect her artistic vision. A Hollywood producer makes a TV movie of the family's surrogacy story. Alex is diagnosed with breast cancer, which leads her to doing a standup comedy act about her cancer experience. Frankie and Mitch divorce and spar over custody of Thomas George.

=== Season Four ===
Cat is attacked and raped by a college acquaintance; James Falconer (George Clooney) is assigned to investigate the case. He is able to help Cat remember her attacker, Kyle, and he is arrested. However the prosecution cannot prove its case and Kyle is found not guilty only to be shot and killed on the courthouse steps by a previous victim. Frankie quits her executive job and buys the Sweet Sixteen diner. Teddy and Falconer run into each other at an AA meeting and begin dating. Trevor rebels and is sent to boarding school, then runs away from the school and disappears. Georgie falls into a depression about her perceived failure as a parent and considers suicide, but decides against it and asks for help. Truman is diagnosed with Alzheimer's disease and initially refuses to tell Beatrice. The stress of Trevor's disappearance leads Georgie and John to separate. Alex gets her own talk show with a lesbian producer named Norma (Nora Dunn). Alex meets Big Al (Robert Klein) when he agrees to sponsor her talk show; she initially dislikes him but they soon begin dating. A fifth sister, Charlotte Bennett (Jo Anderson), is introduced. Charlotte is a cancer patient who needs a bone marrow donation from a relative. Although none of the sisters are a match, she receives the bone marrow from an unrelated donor. Keeping the customary manner in which her half-sisters go by male versions of their full names, Charley is brought into the family and welcomed, primarily through Frankie's effort and determination. Alex and Big Al marry; on their wedding night he is arrested for tax evasion. Georgie and John reunite after realizing they cannot control what happens to Trevor. Reed returns for a visit and gives birth to Halsey. Trevor finally returns from the streets when Winnetka is hit by a tornado, and Falconer and Teddy marry on a plane that is caught in the storm.

=== Season Five ===
Falconer is killed. His murder was ordered by a criminal he was about to testify against in court. Georgie begins seeing a new therapist, Dr. Caspian (Daniel Gerroll), who manipulates her into believing she had been molested by her father. Frankie inherits a boxer, Lucky (John Wesley Shipp), from a former client, and eventually begins a relationship with him. A viewer with terminal cancer asks Alex to take care of her daughter, Roxie (Kathryn Zaremba); Alex wants to adopt the little girl, but her father returns and they move away together. Unable to cope with Falconer's death, Teddy relapses with alcohol. Big Al is released from prison early and runs for mayor. Teddy shows up drunk to his election night victory party and hits Evan on his bicycle with her car; she leaves to enter rehab. Truman gives Alex a videotaped message asking her to help him end his life once his Alzheimer's has advanced. Dr. Caspian and Georgie begin an affair during her therapy sessions; Georgie leaves John, believing Dr. Caspian loves her, but Dr. Caspian ignores her and claims she has misinterpreted their "work" together. Georgie realizes she has been manipulated, but has no evidence to get the psychological board to revoke his license. Charley begins therapy with Dr. Caspian and eventually manages to record him behaving inappropriately toward her during their sessions. Norma fires Alex from her talk show for talking about AIDS against the network's wishes. Frankie accidentally creates Cowlotta, a large pink cow character that children love, and is asked to move to Japan to manage the character. Alex helps Truman end his life; she is arrested, but avoids prison when a terminally ill judge recuses himself from her case. Teddy has an affair with Daniel Albright (Gregory Harrison), the man who had Falconer killed, in an attempt to gather evidence that will send him to jail. With Lucky's help, she succeeds and Albright is arrested. Alex and Norma run a pledge drive for the local PBS station and are asked to create a new version of Alex's talk show. Bea is depressed following Truman's death; Charley offers her a job working as a receptionist in her free clinic. Teddy meets Jack Chambers (Philip Casnoff), the man who received Falconer's transplanted heart, and strikes up a brief relationship with him.

=== Season Six ===
Now divorced from John, Georgie goes to graduate school in psychology. She begins a relationship with Brian (Joe Flanigan), a 24-year-old student in her classes who was very standoffish to her at first. Teddy and Cat are carjacked; Cat meets police officer Billy Griffin (Eric Close) when reporting the crime. Later, Teddy is accidentally shot in the head with the gun she bought for protection. She falls into a coma, but Alex convinces brilliant neurosurgeon Dr. Gabriel Sorenson (Stephen Collins) to operate and save her life. Teddy eventually begins a relationship with Sorenson, and Cat decides to enter the police academy. Charley (now played by Sheila Kelley) becomes a foster parent to Jesse (Sean Nelson), the son of a woman at her free clinic who died. She also begins dating her colleague Dr. Wes Hayes (Michael Whaley), though he is initially resistant to an interracial relationship. Reed (now played by Noelle Parker) returns to town after divorcing Kirby and losing custody of her daughter Halsey, and ends up running a high-priced call-girl ring. Alex turns crucial evidence over to the police and Reed is sentenced to community service. Teddy and Gabe decide to marry, but their wedding is interrupted when a heart donor is found for Big Al; Teddy and Gabe finally marry at the hospital just before Big Al is taken into surgery. Charley decides to adopt Jesse, and plans to quickly marry Wes because two parents make a more appealing adoptive family; however, Charley eventually realizes Jesse should instead be adopted by the family that had already adopted his brother. Charley and Wes marry anyway. Alex's talk show is canceled again and she decides to take an extended trip to help flooding victims in Tennessee. In the final episode, Georgie's college thesis about her sisters deeply angers Alex and Charley, though Teddy finds it amusing. The sisters must put aside their differences when Beatrice has a major stroke. Shortly before Beatrice dies Frankie returns from Japan and clashes with Charley. Later, Frankie announces she wants to move back home to Winnetka. Georgie sees John at Bea's memorial service and realizes she misses him; shortly afterward, she breaks up with Brian. The sisters scatter their mother's ashes on the rosebushes she named after them. Teddy announces she is pregnant with a daughter, who she plans to name Beatrice Rose. Georgie and John discuss reconciling and share an embrace. Finally, Alex assumes the role of family matriarch.

== Characters ==
=== Main ===
Sisters cast members Julianne Phillips, Patricia Kalember, Sela Ward and Swoosie Kurtz.

- Swoosie Kurtz as Alexandra "Alex" Reed Halsey Barker
- Sela Ward as Theodora "Teddy" Reed Margolis Falconer Sorenson
- Patricia Kalember as Georgiana "Georgie" Reed Whitsig
- Julianne Phillips as Francesca "Frankie" Reed Margolis (seasons 1–5, special guest star in season 6)
- Jo Anderson as Dr. Charlotte "Charley" Bennett Hayes (recurring, seasons 4–5)
  - Sheila Kelley as Dr. Charlotte "Charley" Bennett Hayes (main, season 6)
- Elizabeth Hoffman as Beatrice "Bea" Reed Ventnor

=== Supporting ===
- Garrett M. Brown as John Whitsig (seasons 1–5, special guest star in season 6)
- Ed Marinaro as Mitch Margolis (seasons 1–4)
- Heather McAdam as Catherine "Cat" Margolis (recurring, seasons 1–5; main, season 6)

=== Recurring ===
- David Dukes as Dr. Wade Halsey (seasons 1–3)
- Kathy Wagner as Reed Halsey Philby (season 1)
  - Ashley Judd as Reed Halsey Philby (seasons 2–4)
  - Noelle Parker as Reed Halsey Philby (season 6)
- Philip Sterling as Truman Ventner (seasons 1–5)
- David Gianopoulos as Victor Runkel (season 2)
- Paul Rudd as Kirby Philby (seasons 3–4, 6)
- Mark Frankel as Simon Bolt (seasons 3–4)
- George Clooney as Detective James Falconer (seasons 4–5)
- Nora Dunn as Norma Lear (seasons 4–6)
- Robert Klein as Alvin "Big Al" Barker Barkowitz (seasons 4–6)
- Michael Whaley as Dr. Wes Hayes (seasons 5–6)
- Stephen Collins as Dr. Gabriel Sorenson (season 6)
- Joe Flanigan as Brian Kohler-Voss (season 6)
- Eric Close as Billy Griffin (season 6)

== Episodes ==
=== Series overview ===
| Season | Episodes | Originally released | |
| Season | Episodes | First released | Last released |
|---|---|---|---|
| 1 | 7 | May 11, 1991 | June 20, 1991 |
| 2 | 22 | September 21, 1991 | May 2, 1992 |
| 3 | 24 | September 26, 1992 | May 22, 1993 |
| 4 | 22 | September 25, 1993 | May 21, 1994 |
| 5 | 24 | September 24, 1994 | May 6, 1995 |
| 6 | 28 | September 23, 1995 | May 4, 1996 |

=== Season 1 (1991) ===
| No. overall | No. in season | Title | Directed by | Written by | Original release date | Viewers (millions) |
|---|---|---|---|---|---|---|
| 1 | 1 | "Moving In, Moving Out, Moving On" | Robert Butler | Ron Cowen & Daniel Lipman | May 11, 1991 | 15.5 |
Winnetka, Illinois. One year after the death of their father from a long battle with cancer, the four very different sisters of the Reed family try to put aside their personal differences and help their widowed, alcoholic mother, Beatrice, sell her house. Alex, the eldest of the sisters, is a wealthy and snobbish, WASP wife of Wade Halsey, a plastic surgeon, with a teenage daughter, Reed, and is too self-involved with her perfect life to notice anything else, until she's forced to bail out her own mother from jail when she's arrested for drunk driving. Georgie is a real estate agent who takes over as the matriarch of the family to support it and her two sons, Trevor and Evan, when her flaky, unemployed husband, John Whitsig, confines himself to their house singing karaoke in his bathrobe after suffering a nervous breakdown since losing his job. Teddy, the second oldest of the sisters, is a free-spirited drifter and artist who arrives in town after years of living on the road with her teenage daughter Cat and tries to win back her ex-husband Mitch Margolis, a fish store owner, who is now romantically involved with the youngest sister Frankie, an ambitious marketing analyst living in nearby Chicago.
| 2 | 2 | "80%" | Robert Butler | Ron Cowen & Daniel Lipman | May 18, 1991 | 15.9 |
Alex, on the eve of her 15th wedding anniversary party with Wade, realizes that her idyllic marriage may be falling apart when she finds out that he is a cross dresser. Meanwhile, Teddy continues to try to win back her ex-husband Mitch, who will not give in to her pleads for a renewed commitment.
| 3 | 3 | "A Thousand Sprinkles" | Steven Robman | Eric Overmyer & Ron Cowen & Daniel Lipman | May 25, 1991 | 12.8 |
Teddy looking for work, asks Frankie to give her a job at her office as an intern, which only heats up tensions between them over Teddy's continuing ploy to win back Mitch, and Frankie trying to steal the affection of Cat by giving her expensive gifts. Meanwhile, Alex and Wade join a counseling group for cross-dressing husbands much to his anger when he feels that their marital problems be kept private. Georgie tries to find psychiatric help for John while he continues to sulk around the house and sing to himself. Elsewhere, Beatrice meets Judge Truman Ventner after she is indicted for drunk driving and shortly afterward, begins a relationship with him.
| 4 | 4 | "Devoted Husband, Loving Father" | Jan Eliasberg | Ron Cowen & Daniel Lipman | June 1, 1991 | 10.2 |
Frankie, probing into their dead father's past, finds some disturbing secrets she never knew which hints of an extra marital affair he had with one of Beatrice's friends. Meanwhile, Georgie wrestles with temptation when she considers romance with an old college boyfriend when he comes into town, while John decides to pursue a singing career.
| 5 | 5 | "Of Mice and Women" | James A. Contner | Diana Gould | June 8, 1991 | 12.8 |
Georgie, trying to get a raise and a promotion at the reality office, invites her boss over at her house for dinner, which nearly turns disastrous due to Trevor and Evan's problems, and everyone else crashing the event to dump their problems on Georgie. Meanwhile, Alex begins to realize that her financial situation is more in trouble then she thought when all her credit cards are rejected, and she meets a repo man who repossesses her car for non-payments, and at this point, she finally realizes that Wade had invested all of their wealth in a stock that failed. Mitch phones a party-line where he confides his problems about his problems with Frankie, unaware that it is Teddy, now employed as a phone operator. Also, John hires a film crew to rent out the house to record his songs for a cable TV commercial.
| 6 | 6 | "Deja Vu All Over Again" | Arlene Sanford | Eric Overmyer | June 15, 1991 | 12.5 |
Frankie and Mitch announce their engagement to everyone and decide to get married quickly, and Alex is more than happy to hold the wedding at her house. But Teddy is the only one not happy, and after falling off the wagon, she crashes the exchange of vows with a shotgun she stole from Alex and gives the new meaning to the term: "shotgun wedding. While the family members talk to the camera about Frankie and Mitch, Alex gets stuck with some unexpected bills after Wade skips town to escape bill collectors.
| 7 | 7 | "Some Tuesday in July" | Anita W. Addison | Ron Cowen & Daniel Lipman | June 20, 1991 | 13.5 |
With Cat angry and at her for falling off the wagon, Teddy decides that Cat is better off living with Mitch while she thinks about leaving town again. Alex tries to get Reed the lead part in her high school play of 'Romeo and Juliet' despite the fact that Reed cannot act and cannot remember her lines. Meanwhile, Georgie's youngest son Evan, is hospitalized for leukemia. The grim turn of events begin to push Georgie to her breaking point, but it also brings John to his senses when he finally sees the seriousness of his life which brings him out of his near-catatonic state to take a job offer and give support to his family again.

=== Season 2 (1991–92) ===
| No. overall | No. in season | Title | Directed by | Written by | Original release date | Viewers (millions) |
|---|---|---|---|---|---|---|
| 8 | 1 | "One to Grow On" | Steven Robman | Christopher Keyser & Amy Lippman | September 21, 1991 | 15.8 |
Georgie and her sisters plan a birthday party for Evan, who is returning from the hospital. Frankie must decide whether to attend the party or travel to Japan on business. Teddy's continued drinking drives the other sisters away.
| 9 | 2 | "The Picture of Perfection" | Sandy Smolan | Cathryn Michon | September 28, 1991 | 14.9 |
Mitch and Frankie get married.
| 10 | 3 | "Strikes and Spares" | Steven Robman | Alex Gansa & Howard Gordon | October 5, 1991 | 14.7 |
Wade's mistress, Tiffany Blue, tries to convince Wade to have a hit man kill Alex before she can finalize their divorce. Teddy's relationship with Hank Seawall heats up.
| 11 | 4 | "Living Arrangements" | Sandy Smolan | Cynthia Saunders | October 12, 1991 | 14.9 |
Cat runs away to avoid living with Mitch and Frankie. Teddy, Mitch, and Frankie go looking for her. Teddy can't bring herself to tell her family she's pregnant and that Mitch might be the father, so she considers having an abortion.
| 12 | 5 | "A Kiss is Still a Kiss" | Deborah Reinisch | Christopher Keyser & Amy Lippman | October 19, 1991 | 15.1 |
Alex finds romance when she attends her 20-year high school reunion. Truman asks Beatrice to spend the weekend with him. John wants to spend some romantic time with Georgie.
| 13 | 6 | "Freedom's Just Another Word" | Christopher Hibler | Ron Cowen & Daniel Lipman | November 2, 1991 | 14.5 |
Hank's nude photographs of Teddy surface at an art exhibit hosted by Alex. Teddy lands in jail when she assaults a police officer. Alex asks Victor to escort her to the art exhibit in order to make Wade jealous when she learns that he is bringing a date. Two radio DJs humiliate John during an on-the-air interview.
| 14 | 7 | "The Family Way" | Fred Gerber | Christopher Keyser & Amy Lippman | November 9, 1991 | 16.1 |
Hank tries to convince Teddy to tell Mitch about her pregnancy. Alex finds out about her mother's relationship with Truman. Trevor becomes rebellious due to feeling neglected by John and Georgie, who have been giving all their attention to his sickly younger brother Evan.
| 15 | 8 | "The Kindness of Strangers" | Jan Eliasberg | Richard Gollance | November 16, 1991 | 16.5 |
Alex, getting no help from a computer dating service, decides that Victor is the perfect choice to fit the bill despite the fact that they both come from very different backgrounds. While Mitch is out of town with Cat, his overbearing and meddlesome mother, Naomi, pays an unexpected and unwelcome visit to Frankie at her loft. But they soon discover that they have a lot in common. Georgie and John's cranky neighbor, Mr. Ratner, causes problems for them over property rights, and Georgie eventually discovers the real deep-rooted reason for Mr. Ratner's unhappiness.
| 16 | 9 | "Georgie Through the Looking Glass" | Lorraine Senna Ferrera | Richard Greenberg | November 23, 1991 | 14.2 |
On Thanksgiving, Georgie visits the old Reed home where she grew up and mysteriously is transported back in time where she views one particular Thanksgiving that put a change on her life. Back at the Wistig house, John and the others wait impatiently for Evans health tests to say if he will live or not. Meanwhile, Reed returns from a six-month trip to France transformed into a rebellious activist and causes problems for both Alex and Wade over her newfound personality.
| 17 | 10 | "Two Steps Forward, Three Steps Back" | James A. Contner | Jeff Baron | December 14, 1991 | 13.9 |
While trying to keep her window decoration job, Teddy has a miscarriage that is an emotional setback for her. Alex discovers that Reed has her own reasons why she wants to enter with her in the annual Mother/Daughter costume pageant, that Reed wants to use the first prize money to return to France since learning that her parents are now divorced. Meanwhile, Frankie can't decide whether or not to complain of an annoying office Lothario who makes unwanted sexual passes at her because he is her ticket to becoming corporate vice president of the firm.
| 18 | 11 | "Eggnog" | Kevin Inch | Ron Cowen & Daniel Lipman | December 21, 1991 | 16.9 |
On Christmas Eve, Georgie attempts to infect the family with Christmas cheer, but Bea's contaminated eggnog infects them with food poisoning. Alex attempts to get out of the family Christmas and go on a vacation to Mexico with Victor. Frankie and Mitch come to blows over Mitch's attention to Teddy over her recent miscarriage. Meanwhile, Teddy receives an emotional boost when she begins having conversations with the ghost of Charles Dickens (Tony Jay) over what to do with her life. Also, Trevor, Evan, and Cat rent a series of horror movies ("Santacide") with a Christmas theme.
| 19 | 12 | "Good Help is Hard to Find" | James A. Contner | Jeffrey Stepakoff | January 11, 1992 | 14.2 |
Georgie finds her voice when she comes to the defense of Evan's HIV-positive teacher (Raphael Sbarge), who the school wants to fire. Alex tries to stop the deportation of her Guatemalan maid (Shelley Morrison), and Frankie reluctantly helps Mitch and Teddy with their tax audit.
| 20 | 13 | "Troubled Waters" | Jan Eliasberg | Amy Lippman & Christopher Keyser | January 18, 1992 | 15.3 |
Alex has to decide between going with ex-husband Wade or new boyfriend Victor to an awards show. Mitch tries to convince Frankie to go on a fishing trip. Teddy has difficulty deciding on a car.
| 21 | 14 | "Working Girls" | Steven Robman | Gardner Stern | January 25, 1992 | 15.9 |
Frankie is faced with a difficult choice when the man who harassed her at work has started to harass a new coworker (Heidi Swedberg). Teddy is fired from her job as a window dresser, and decides to start selling cosmetics door-to-door. Bea and Truman announce their plans to move in together, but find it hard to make compromises.
| 22 | 15 | "Tippecanoe and Georgie Too!" | Kevin Inch | Abraham Tetenbaum | February 8, 1992 | 12.0 |
Georgie announces her candidacy for the Local School Board. However, she has second thoughts when a campaign consultant (Nicholas Pryor) starts to alienate her from her family. Alex and Wade interview a private school for Reed. Frankie and Mitch try to sell a stove that they think is worthless.
| 23 | 16 | "The Four Elements" | James A. Contner | Ron Cowen & Daniel Lipman & Michael Filerman | February 15, 1992 | 10.1 |
Teddy's new clothing designs are destroyed in a fire. Victor saves Reed from drowning in the bath tub.
| 24 | 17 | "A Matter of Life and Death" | Gwen Arner | Thomas Babe | February 22, 1992 | 11.3 |
Georgie continues to campaign before the city council election, while Teddy and Frankie quarrel over personal items they want to keep. Beatrice is rushed to the hospital suffering a heart attack.
| 25 | 18 | "The First Time" | Jan Eliasberg | Story by : Christopher Keyser & Amy Lippman; Teleplay by : Daniel Lipman & Jeffrey Stepakoff | February 29, 1992 | 15.7 |
Teddy and Mitch are upset upon learning that Cat intends to have sex with her boyfriend.
| 26 | 19 | "Empty Rooms" | Fred Gerber | Jeff Baron | April 11, 1992 | 13.7 |
The sisters try to cheer up Beatrice, who has become depressed after her heart attack. Frankie considers adoption when she learns that she can't become pregnant.
| 27 | 20 | "Heart and Soul" | David Carson | Christopher Keyser & Amy Lippman | April 18, 1992 | 13.4 |
Teddy finds a new romantic interest in her Alcoholics Anonymous sponsor, Harry Chris Sarandon. Wade asks Alex to reconcile.
| 28 | 21 | "Pandora's Box" | Fred Gerber | Jeffrey Stepakoff | April 25, 1992 | 14.5 |
A teenage mother has second thoughts after offering her baby to Mitch and Frankie to adopt. Beatrice decides to break up with Truman if he doesn't marry her.
| 29 | 22 | "Not in a Million Years" | Kevin Inch | Ron Cowen & Daniel Lipman | May 2, 1992 | 14.7 |
Georgie agrees to carry Frankie and Mitch's baby.

=== Season 3 (1992–93) ===
| No. overall | No. in season | Title | Directed by | Written by | Original release date | Viewers (millions) |
|---|---|---|---|---|---|---|
| 30 | 1 | "Sunstroke" | James A. Contner | Ron Cowen & Daniel Lipman | September 26, 1992 | 15.5 |
During a late-summer heat wave, Alex wants to have the perfect wedding for her mother and Truman. But Beatrice doesn't like her daughter's plans. While Alex spends a romantic evening with her ex-husband, Wade, Reed informs them that she wants to quit college to be with her boyfriend Kirby. Later, Reed informs everyone that she has married Kirby, and Alex reacts by breaking every piece of crystal in her house. Meanwhile, Frankie is concerned that Georgie, who is seven months pregnant, may be over-exerting herself, so she hires a housekeeper for Georgie. While Cat prepares to leave town for college, Teddy fears that Beatrice will move away from everyone after she marries Truman.
| 31 | 2 | "The Bottom Line" | Steve Robman | Kimberly Costello | October 3, 1992 | 13.0 |
Teddy finds a way to help her struggling clothing business when, after Alex invites her to a dinner party, Teddy meets Simon Bolt, a wealthy but cynical British corporate magnate who becomes interested in her work and wants to invest $10 million to help expand her business. Meanwhile, Laura, a sexy TV reporter, wants to know about Mitch and his fish store which makes Frankie jealous. Also, the very pregnant Georgie fights her sudden craving for chocolate.
| 32 | 3 | "A Promise Kept" | James A. Contner | Lisa Melamed | October 10, 1992 | 15.0 |
Frankie decides to convert and raise a Jewish family with Mitch, much to the shock of the family, especially the conservative Beatrice. Meanwhile, Teddy and Simon fight over how to run Teddy's new clothing factory and over McKinley working for the company. Also, Alex helps Reed and Kirby with moving into their new apartment and afterward takes them into her house after they are evicted.
| 33 | 4 | "And God Laughs" | Steve Robman | Christopher Keyser & Amy Lippman | October 17, 1992 | 15.6 |
Georgie flashes back after learning John's plane crashed; Bolt coaches Teddy for a news conference spotlighting her line.
| 34 | 5 | "Sins of the Mothers" | Harry Harris | Kimberly Costello | October 24, 1992 | 13.2 |
Teddy becomes concerned when she catches Cat drunk, Alex gets a lesson in political correctness, and Frankie fears she might be pregnant.
| 35 | 6 | "Lost Souls" | Barbara Amato | Ron Cowen & Daniel Lipman | October 31, 1992 | 13.6 |
Alex thinks she accidentally killed a man, Frankie and Mitch spend the night in a haunted house, and Teddy learns of the secret that haunts Simon.
| 36 | 7 | "Accidents Will Happen" | Kevin Inch | Lisa Melamed | November 7, 1992 | 14.9 |
Mitch gets into a dispute with a friend who takes a fall outside of Mitch's store, and Beatrice, Georgie and Alex win the lottery.
| 37 | 8 | "Crash and Born" | Nancy Malone | Christopher Keyser & Amy Lippman | November 14, 1992 | 17.6 |
After being hit by a drunk driver, Georgie now trapped inside her car, goes into labor-while her sisters look on helplessly.
| 38 | 9 | "The Best Seats in the House" | Michael Engler | Story by : Christopher Keyser & Amy Lippman; Teleplay by : Kimberly Costello & Lisa Melamed | November 21, 1992 | 16.9 |
Teddy has her first Fashion Show, and Georgie struggles with postpartum depression and her feelings toward Frankie and their shared child.
| 39 | 10 | "Rivals" | James A. Contner | Hugh O'Neill | December 5, 1992 | 12.8 |
Alex proposes a line of jewelry to Simon, Frankie and Beatrice feud over the upbringing of Frankie's baby, and Reed is caught in a test of wills between her father and Kirby.
| 40 | 11 | "Portrait of the Artists" | Michael Lange | Lisa Melamed | December 12, 1992 | 14.3 |
Teddy learns that her high school beau has AIDS, Alex enrolls in a writing class taught by a famous author and Frankie drives Georgie's family crazy.
| 41 | 12 | "Teach Your Children Well" | Gwen Arner | Christopher Keyser & Amy Lippman | December 19, 1992 | 12.0 |
During Frankie's first Hanukkah, a swastika is painted on Mitch's storefront, and John's dad shows up to make peace.
| 42 | 13 | "All That Glitters" | Barbara Amato | Kimberly Costello | January 9, 1993 | 15.1 |
Restless Frankie wants to curtail her maternity leave, putting her at odds with Mitch; Teddy cautiously agrees to live with Bolt.
| 43 | 14 | "Crimes and Ms. Demeanors" | Gwen Arner | Janet Himelstein & P.K. Knelman | January 16, 1993 | 14.3 |
Teddy declares war on a fashion critic (Concetta Tomei); Georgie backs over a neighbor's (George Furth) chihuahua.
| 44 | 15 | "The Whole Truth" | Jan Eliasberg | Ruth Wolff | January 23, 1993 | 12.9 |
A screenwriter profiles Georgie's surrogacy and starts family fights; Alex tries to get her daughter and son-in-law to leave.
| 45 | 16 | "Things Are Tough All Over" | Harry Harris | Christopher Keyser & Amy Lippman | February 6, 1993 | 13.9 |
A TV movie on the sisters unites Alex with her romantic idol.
| 46 | 17 | "Moving Pictures" | Kevin Inch | Ron Cowen & Daniel Lipman | February 13, 1993 | 13.0 |
As Alex undergoes breast-augmentation surgery, a small malignancy is found, forcing the removal of the tumor and part of her breast.
| 47 | 18 | "Mirror, Mirror" | Fred Gerber | Richard Greenberg | February 20, 1993 | 14.7 |
Worry over chemotherapy makes Alex more sarcastic; Teddy offers to sell her shares to ward off a takeover; tests indicate Evan is a genius.
| 48 | 19 | "Different" | Harry Harris | Lisa Melamed | February 27, 1993 | 12.3 |
Georgie is hired to write an advice column for the local newspaper; John thinks Teddy has fallen in love with him; Alex and Frankie accuse Truman of cheating on their mother.
| 49 | 20 | "Dear Georgie" | Fred Gerber | Lisa Melamed | April 24, 1993 | 14.2 |
Georgie is hired to write an advice column for the local newspaper; John thinks Teddy has fallen in love with him; Alex and Frankie accuse Truman of cheating on their mother.
| 50 | 21 | "Some Other Time" | Fred Gerber | Christopher Keyser & Amy Lippman | May 1, 1993 | 12.5 |
A podiatrist (John Schuck) romances Alex; Frankie spends time with an executive; Georgie and John try to rekindle romance.
| 51 | 22 | "The Cold Light of Day" | Kevin Inch | Ron Cowen (story), Daniel Lipman (teleplay), Kimberly Costello (teleplay & story) | May 8, 1993 | 12.7 |
Bolt proposes to Teddy; Alex buys a wig from a mystic who claims it has powers; Frankie and Mitch consult a marriage counselor.
| 52 | 23 | "Out of the Ashes" | Michael Engler | Amy Lippman & Christopher Keyser | May 15, 1993 | 12.9 |
Moving into a new house makes Mitch confront Frankie; a diminutive Texas billionaire (Henry Gibson) buys out Teddy's firm.
| 53 | 24 | "The Icing on the Cake" | Kevin Inch | Story by : Christopher Keyser & Amy Lippman; Teleplay by : Lisa Melamed & Daniel Lipman | May 22, 1993 | 12.7 |
The siblings fight as the airing of their TV movie approaches; Frankie takes a job offer in New York.

=== Season 4 (1993–94) ===
| No. overall | No. in season | Title | Directed by | Written by | Original release date | Viewers (millions) |
|---|---|---|---|---|---|---|
| 54 | 1 | "Back on Track" | Kevin Inch | Lisa Melamed | September 25, 1993 | 13.6 |
Frankie and Mitch battle in court over their son; Cat trains Alex for a marathon; the first lady seeks Teddy's services.
| 55 | 2 | "The Land of the Lost Children" | Steven Robman | Kathryn Pratt | October 2, 1993 | 12.1 |
Seeking to avenge the attack on Cat, Teddy interferes in the investigation; Reed joins a religious cult.
| 56 | 3 | "Demons" | Sharron Miller | Story by : Christopher Keyser & Amy Lippman; Teleplay by : Ron Cowen & Lisa Melamed | October 9, 1993 | 14.9 |
Teddy overreacts when Cat's attacker makes bail; Frankie prepares for a date with a man she met over her computer; Alex wants John on her show.
| 57 | 4 | "A Kick in the Caboose" | Steven Robman | Christopher Keyser & Amy Lippman | October 16, 1993 | 11.2 |
Alex is offered a job as a talk show host. Frankie buys the Sweet Sixteen with Georgie as her partner. Teddy decides that she and Mitch should remain friends.
| 58 | 5 | "Sleepless in Winnetka" | Michael Engler | Ron Cowen, Daniel Lipman & Lisa Melamed | October 23, 1993 | 11.5 |
| 59 | 6 | "The Good Daughter" | James A. Contner | Ron Cowen, Daniel Lipman & Georgia Jeffries | October 30, 1993 | 16.1 |
| 60 | 7 | "Something in Common" | Mel Damski | Kathryn Pratt | November 6, 1993 | 14.4 |
Teddy falls for Falconer (George Clooney). Georgie's older son begins dating an older girl, drinking, and failing in school.
| 61 | 8 | "A Bolt From the Blue" | Michael Engler | Christopher Keyser & Amy Lippman | November 13, 1993 | 12.7 |
| 62 | 9 | "The Best Intentions" | Gwen Arner | Lisa Melamed | November 20, 1993 | 13.9 |
| 63 | 10 | "The Things We Do for Love" | Jan Eliasberg | Linda Mathious & Heather MacGillvray | November 27, 1993 | 14.0 |
| 64 | 11 | "Broken Angel" | Bethany Rooney | Daniel Lipman | December 11, 1993 | 12.3 |
| 65 | 12 | "Second Thoughts" | Jan Eliasberg | Lisa Melamed & Kathryn Pratt | December 18, 1993 | 12.1 |
| 66 | 13 | "A Path Through the Snow" | Kevin Inch | Amy Lippman & Christopher Keyser | January 15, 1994 | 13.2 |
| 67 | 14 | "Chemical Reactions" | Bethany Rooney | Kathryn Pratt & Lisa Melamed | January 22, 1994 | 14.2 |
| 68 | 15 | "Poison" | Mel Damski | Amy Lippman & Christopher Keyser | January 29, 1994 | 13.5 |
| 69 | 16 | "Tangled Webs" | Kevin Inch | Eric Estrin & Michael Berlin | February 5, 1994 | 13.3 |
| 70 | 17 | "Up to His Old Tricks" | James A. Contner | Story by : Daniel Kipman & Kathryn Pratt; Teleplay by : Ron Cowen & Kathryn Pratt | February 12, 1994 | 12.2 |
| 71 | 18 | "Blood is Thicker Than Water" | Mel Damski | Christopher Keyser & Amy Lippman | April 23, 1994 | 14.1 |
| 72 | 19 | "Lock and Key" | James A. Contner | Lisa Melamed | April 30, 1994 | 13.3 |
| 73 | 20 | "Life Upside-Down" | Mel Damski | Eric Estrin & Michael Berlin | May 7, 1994 | 11.8 |
| 74 | 21 | "Protective Measures" | Steven Robman | Christopher Keyser & Amy Lippman | May 14, 1994 | 12.2 |
| 75 | 22 | "Up in the Air" | Kevin Inch | Story by : Christopher Keyser & Amy Lippman; Teleplay by : Lisa Melamed & Ron Cowen | May 21, 1994 | 12.7 |

=== Season 5 (1994–95) ===
| No. overall | No. in season | Title | Directed by | Written by | Original release date | Viewers (millions) |
|---|---|---|---|---|---|---|
| 76 | 1 | "Bombshell" | James A. Contner | Kathryn Pratt | September 24, 1994 | 13.5 |
| 77 | 2 | "Blinders" | Robert C. Mandel | Lisa Melamed | October 1, 1994 | 13.8 |
| 78 | 3 | "I Only Have Eyes for You" | James A. Contner | Kathryn Pratt | October 8, 1994 | 11.2 |
| 79 | 4 | "Falling Leaves" | Alan Myerson | Peter Schneider | October 15, 1994 | 12.5 |
| 80 | 5 | "Heroes" | Janet G. Knutsen | Allison Hock | October 22, 1994 | 10.9 |
| 81 | 6 | "Scandalous" | Bethany Rooney | Tammy Ader | October 29, 1994 | 10.7 |
| 82 | 7 | "Down for the Count" | Kevin Inch | Kathryn Pratt | November 5, 1994 | 11.8 |
| 83 | 8 | "Cold Turkey" | Helaine Head | Lisa Melamed | November 12, 1994 | 11.4 |
| 84 | 9 | "Paradise Lost" | James A. Contner | Peter Schneider | November 19, 1994 | 12.6 |
| 85 | 10 | "Twilight Time" | Rachel Feldman | Allison Hock | December 3, 1994 | 12.8 |
| 86 | 11 | "A Child Is Given" | Harry Harris | Tammy Ader | December 17, 1994 | 11.2 |
| 87 | 12 | "No Pain, No Gain" | Jan Eliasberg | Lisa Melamed | January 7, 1995 | 13.0 |
| 88 | 13 | "A Lullaby to My Father" | Kevin Inch | Jan Eliasberg | January 14, 1995 | 13.0 |
| 89 | 14 | "A Good Deed" | Michael Schultz | Bertha Mason | January 21, 1995 | 12.2 |
| 90 | 15 | "A House Divided" | Davis Guggenheim | Lindsay Harrison | February 4, 1995 | 12.6 |
| 91 | 16 | "A Proper Farewell" | Bruce Humphrey | Tammy Ader | February 11, 1995 | 13.2 |
| 92 | 17 | "Angel of Death" | Kevin Inch | Kathryn Pratt & Lisa Melamed | February 18, 1995 | 11.3 |
| 93 | 18 | "Sleeping with the Devil" | Alan Myerson | Lindsay Harrison | March 4, 1995 | 12.5 |
| 94 | 19 | "Judgement Day" | Michael Engler | Tammy Ader | April 1, 1995 | 11.7 |
| 95 | 20 | "Word of Honor" | Michael Lange | Story by : Ron Cowen & Daniel Lipman; Teleplay by : Lisa Melamed & Kathryn Pratt | April 8, 1995 | 10.9 |
| 96 | 21 | "Remembrance of Sisters Past" | Kevin Inch | Jan Eliasberg | April 15, 1995 | 9.9 |
| 97 | 22 | "A Fighting Chance" | Rachel Feldman | Lindsay Harrison | April 22, 1995 | 10.1 |
| 98 | 23 | "Matters of the Heart" | Jan Eliasberg | Tammy Ader & Lisa Melamed | April 29, 1995 | 10.5 |
| 99 | 24 | "Enchanted May" | Harry Harris | Story by : Ron Cowen & Daniel Lipman; Teleplay by : Kathryn Pratt | May 6, 1995 | 10.5 |

=== Season 6 (1995–96) ===
| No. overall | No. in season | Title | Directed by | Written by | Original release date | Viewers (millions) |
|---|---|---|---|---|---|---|
| 100 | 1 | "100" | Kevin Inch | Ron Cowen & Daniel Lipman | September 23, 1995 | 9.6 |
| 101 | 2 | "Out of the Woods" | James A. Contner | Jan Eliasberg | September 30, 1995 | 10.4 |
| 102 | 3 | "The Passion of Our Youth" | Harry Harris | Tammy Ader | October 7, 1995 | 9.8 |
| 103 | 4 | "One Fine Day" | Rachel Feldman | Kathryn Pratt & Deborah Starr Seibel | October 21, 1995 | 10.4 |
| 104 | 5 | "Deceit" | Michael Schultz | Kathryn Pratt & Lindsay Harrison | November 4, 1995 | 8.9 |
| 105 | 6 | "For Everything a Season: Parts 1 & 2" "A Perfect Circle" "Change of Life" | Joan Micklin Silver (part 1) | Jan Eliasberg (part 1) | November 11, 1995 | 8.3 |
| 106 | 7 | "For Everything a Season: Parts 1 & 2" "A Perfect Circle" "Change of Life" | Kevin Inch (part 2) | Molly Newman (part 2) | November 11, 1995 | 8.3 |
| 107 | 8 | "Renaissance Woman" | James A. Contner | Tammy Ader | November 18, 1995 | 10.1 |
| 108 | 9 | "A Perfectly Reasonable Explanation" | Mel Damski | Deborah Starr Seibel | November 25, 1995 | 10.6 |
| 109 | 10 | "Sleeping Beauty" | Kevin Inch | Jan Eliasberg | December 2, 1995 | 9.7 |
| 110 | 11 | "A Tough Act to Follow" | Janet G. Knutsen | Lindsay Harrison | December 9, 1995 | 8.9 |
| 111 | 12 | "A Sudden Change of Heart" | Harry Harris | Molly Newman | January 6, 1996 | 8.0 |
| 112 | 13 | "The Man That Got Away" | Ronald L. Schwary | Tammy Ader | January 13, 1996 | 7.7 |
| 113 | 14 | "Double, Double, Toil and Trouble" | Bruce Humphrey | Deborah Starr Seibel | January 20, 1996 | 8.1 |
| 114 | 15 | "Impersonators" | Michael Schultz | Lindsay Harrison | January 27, 1996 | 10.1 |
| 115 | 16 | "The Best Man" | Rachel Feldman | Jan Eliasberg | February 3, 1996 | 9.0 |
| 116 | 17 | "A Little Snag" | Kevin Inch | Molly Newman | February 10, 1996 | 7.6 |
| 117 | 18 | "Don't Go to Springfield" | Mel Damski | Kathryn Pratt | March 2, 1996 | 7.5 |
| 118 | 19 | "Where There's Smoke" | Kevin Inch | Lindsay Harrison | March 9, 1996 | 8.2 |
| 119 | 20 | "Leap Before You Look" | Davis Guggenheim | Jan Eliasberg | March 16, 1996 | 8.2 |
| 120 | 21 | "Dreamcatcher" | Graeme Clifford | Deborah Starr Seibel | March 23, 1996 | 6.6 |
| 121 | 22 | "The Price" | Harry Harris | Molly Newman | March 30, 1996 | 8.7 |
| 122 | 23 | "Guess Who's Coming to Seder" | Mel Damski | Tammy Ader & Lindsay Harrison | April 6, 1996 | 7.4 |
| 123 | 24 | "Nothing Personal" | Shawn Nelson | Nora Dunn | April 13, 1996 | 7.6 |
| 124 | 25 | "Housecleaning" | Harry Harris | Deborah Starr Seibel | April 20, 1996 | 7.3 |
| 125 | 26 | "Taking a Gamble" | Graeme Clifford | Lindsay Harrison | April 27, 1996 | 8.8 |
| 126 | 27 | "War & Peace: Part 1 & 2" | James A. Contner | Story by : Ron Cowen & Daniel Lipman; Teleplay by : Kathryn Pratt & Tammy Ader | May 4, 1996 | 10.1 |
| 127 | 28 | "War & Peace: Part 1 & 2" | James A. Contner | Story by : Ron Cowen & Daniel Lipman; Teleplay by : Kathryn Pratt & Tammy Ader | May 4, 1996 | 10.1 |

== Home media ==
On June 2, 2015, it was announced that Shout! Factory (under WB license) had acquired the rights to the series in Region 1; they have subsequently released all six seasons on DVD.

| DVD name | Ep # | Release date |
|---|---|---|
| Seasons One and Two | 29 | September 15, 2015 |
| Season Three | 24 | January 19, 2016 |
| Season Four | 22 | April 12, 2016 |
| Season Five | 24 | July 19, 2016 |
| Season Six | 29 | November 8, 2016 |

== Reception ==
=== Ratings ===
| Season | | U.S. ratings | Network | Rank |
|---|---|---|---|---|
| 1 | 1990-1991 | N/A | NBC | N/A |
| 2 | 1991–1992 | 10.45 million | NBC | #55 |
| 3 | 1992–1993 | 10.11 million | NBC | #56 |
| 4 | 1993–1994 | 10.11 million | NBC | #52 |
| 5 | 1994–1995 | 9.0 million | NBC | #75 |
| 6 | 1995–1996 | 6.8 million | NBC | #103 |

=== Accolades ===
The series received eight Emmy Award nominations over the course of its run, winning once in 1994 for Sela Ward as Outstanding Lead Actress in a Drama Series. Swoosie Kurtz was also nominated twice in the same category in 1993 and 1994.
