= Mastergate =

Mastergate is a play by Larry Gelbart, which he describes as "A Play On Words". The title refers to a fictional political scandal enacted on "Master Pictures Studios", a fictional movie company that is actually a cover for arms trading. The title of the play also references other real-life political scandals, such as Watergate and others subsequently given the suffix -gate.

== Plot summary ==
The play is set in the Sherman Adams Room at the John Mitchell Building in Washington, D.C. The "Select Joint Congressional Committee Investigating Alleged Covert Arms Assistance to Alleged Other Americas" investigates the CIA's attempt to divert arms to Central American guerrillas through a motion picture company's high-budget action film, entitled "Tet." (a reference to the Tet Offensive)

Mastergate is a satire on congressional investigative committee hearings that took place during the McCarthy Era, on the Watergate investigation, and on the Iran-Contra affair. In his opening address, the chairman explains that the purpose of the hearings is to find out what the president knew and if he had any idea of the affair. The satire employs many aspects of rhetoric and word-play, including puns, malapropism, mixed metaphors, tautology and Washington double-speak. The playwright said of his work that it is "First and foremost...a play about language. It's not for me to discover that politicians are corrupt or full of hot air. It's really about what they and television have done to the way we speak and the way we listen." The play uncovers aspects of the absurd in the working life of government employees; for example, it portrays a non-meeting, a non-discussion, and people being present in the minutes of the meeting despite not attending.

It has been argued that several of the characters have real-life counterparts, for example, Major Manley Battle may be based on Oliver North.

== Characters ==
- The committee:
  - Merry Chase, a reporter for TNN (Total Network News)
  - Archer Bowman, the committee chairman
  - Oral Proctor, a congressman who had been elected for thirty terms
  - Shepherd Hunter, the chief general counsel for the Combined Permanent Sub-Committee
  - Representative Byers
  - Senator Knight
  - Representative Sellers
- The witnesses:
  - Stuart Butler, a Department of Justice employee and acting assistant to the acting assistant deputy attorney general
  - Foster Child, Butler’s attorney of the fictional law firm 'Prior, Pastor, Priest and Pope'
  - Senator Abel Lamb
  - Nat Picker, his attorney of the fictional law firm 'Block, Stall, Wilde and Wilder'
  - Courtleigh Bishop, Secretary of State
  - Major Manley Battle
  - Lance Boyle, Battle’s attorney
  - Vice President Dale Burden
  - Wily Slaughter, director of the CIA

== Performance History ==
Original Broadway Run
Criterion Centre Stage Right
First Preview: September 22, 1989
Opening Date: October 12, 1989
Closing Date: December 10, 1989
Previews: 23
Performances: 69

Original Production Credits
Larry Gelbart Writer
Michael Engler Director
Philipp Jung Scenic Design
Candice Donnelly Costume Design
Stephen Strawbridge Lighting Design
Marc Salzberg Sound Design

The play was filmed for television in 1992. The production used the Emerald Room of the Biltmore Hotel, Los Angeles as a backdrop to the hearings.

The play was recorded by L.A. Theatre Works during their 1991-1992 season with a cast including Walter Matthau and Harold Gould.

== Reviews of Mastergate ==
Positive reviews included that of Jack Kroll in Newsweek, who wrote, "If George Orwell were a gag writer, he could have written Mastergate. Larry Gelbart's scathingly funny takeoff on the Iran-Contra hearings is a spiky cactus flower in the desert of American political theatre." Similarly, Frank Rich of The New York Times wrote, "When Mastergate is funny, it is very funny. When it is not, it still stands up for a patriotic integrity beyond the understanding of the clowns who parade across its national stage."

By contrast, Howard Kissel of the Daily News, wrote "If you think the title is funny, you'll probably enjoy Mastergate. If you find it adolescent, which I'm afraid I do, stay home and read Mark Twain on politics." Likewise, Linda Winer of Newsday wrote, "Mastergate is a one-joke extended sketch that, unfortunately, never manages the leap to dramatic - much less philosophical - revelation of much we didn't already know. Nevertheless, the joke is a very good one, performed with deadpan delight by deft imitators."

== Awards ==
- Outer Critics Circle 1990 Special Award: Larry Gelbart - (Winner)
- 1990 Theatre World Award: Daniel von Bargen - (Winner)

== Adaptation ==
A film was made in 1992 based on the play. The film was directed by Michael Engler and written by Larry Gelbart and produced by David Jablin.

=== Cast ===
==== Main ====
- Tim Reid as Chip Chatworth
- Marcia Strassman as Merry Chase
- Buck Henry as Clay Fielder
- Richard Kiley as Archer Bowman
- Ed Begley Jr. as Steward Butler
- David Ogden Stiers as Shepherd Hunter
- Henry Jones as Oral Proctor
- Bruno Kirby as Abel Lamb
- Jerry Orbach as Clifton Byers
- Ken Howard as Courtleigh Bishop
- Pat Morita as Kevin Naito
- James Coburn as Major Manley Battle
- Darren McGavin as Folsom Bunting
- Robert Guillaume as Sydley Sellers
- Dennis Weaver as V.P. Dale Burden
- Burgess Meredith as Wiley Slaughter

==== Supporting ====
- Mark L. Taylor as Foster Child
- Ron Vawter as Nat Picker
- Louis Giambalvo as Lance Boil
- Ben Stein as Marvin Rotweiler
- Hy Averback as TNN announcer
- Lynn Sellers as Mrs. Abel Lamb
