= Gigi Rice =

American actress (active 1989– )

- Education: Ohio State University (BFA)
- Occupation: Actress
- Years active: 1989–present
- Known for: The John Larroquette Show; Delta; Do Over; Frasier
- Spouse: Ted McGinley (m. 1991)
- Children: 2

Gigi Rice is an American actress best known as Carly Watkins in The John Larroquette Show (1993-1996).

== Biography ==
Rice graduated from The Ohio State University, with a bachelor of fine arts in musical theatre. Following her graduation, Rice served as an apprentice at Burt Reynolds's in Jupiter, Florida. While there, she appeared in Mame, directed by Charles Nelson Reilly, and I'm Not Rappaport, directed by Burt Reynolds.

On television, Rice portrayed Lavonne Overton on Delta, Karen Larsen on Do Over, Samantha Glick on Harry and the Hendersons, Carlie Watkins on The John Larroquette Show, and Charlotte Lerner on Significant Others.

Rice married actor Ted McGinley, and they have two sons, Beau and Quinn. They reside in Los Angeles.

== Filmography ==
Year	Title	Role	Notes
1989–1990	B.L. Stryker	Peppi Hausman	2 episodes
1990	Columbo	Dian's Secretary	One episode
1990	Coach	Clerk	One episode
1990	Revealing Evidence: Stalking the Honolulu Strangler	Betsy King	TV movie
1990–1991	Harry and the Hendersons	Samantha Glick	One episode
1991	K-9	Monice du Tour	TV movie
1991	Quantum Leap	Tina Martinez	One episode
1992	Tequila and Bonetti	Elizabeth	One episode
1992	Herman's Head	Mrs. Crawford	One episode
1992–1993	Delta	Lavonne Overton	17 episodes
1993	Deadfall	Blanche	
1993–1996	The John Larroquette Show	Carly Watkins	84 episodes
1994	Mr. Write	Shelly	
1994	A Gift from Heaven	Messy Samuals	
1995	Deadly Family Secrets	Linda	TV movie
1996	Deadly Web	Terri Lawrence	TV movie
1998	A Night at the Roxbury	Vivica	
1998	Significant Others	Charlotte Lerner	5 episodes
1999	Hard Time: The Premonition	Janice	TV movie
1999	Partners	Phyllis	TV movie
1999	Any Day Now		One episode
1999–2001	Frasier	Regan Shaw	3 episodes
2000	The Fugitive	Shelly	One episode
2001	Will & Grace	Heidi Dauro	One episode
2002	It's All About You	Gail	
2002	My Guide to Becoming a Rock Star	Roberta	2 episodes
2002–2003	Do Over	Karen Larsen	15 episodes
2004	The Stones		One episode
2004	NTSB: The Crash of Flight 323	Annie	TV movie
2004	CSI: Crime Scene Investigation	Terry Durbin	One episode
2004	Center of the Universe	Donna Kidwell	One episode
2004	George Lopez	Wendy	One episode
2005	Two and a Half Men	Christine	One episode
2005	McBride: The Doctor Is Out... Really Out	Jessica	TV movie
2005	George Lopez	Tammy	One episode
2005	The Man	Susan	
2005	Hope & Faith	Trudy	One episode
2005	Nip/Tuck	Gretchen Carr	One episode
2006	The Closer	Linda Salk	One episode
2007	The Storm Awaits	JaJa Lancelot	Short film
2007	Moonlight	Martha Ellis	One episode
2007	Las Vegas	Rita Kagle	One episode
2008	The New Adventures of Old Christine	Shelley	One episode
2008	Cold Case	Jules Murphy	One episode
2007–2012	Army Wives	Marda Brooks	5 episodes
2009	Crossing Over	Hooker	
2009	CSI: Crime Scene Investigation	Yvette Baker	One episode
2009	Ghost Whisperer	Paula Collier	One episode
2010	Ashley's Ashes	Sandy	
2011	And They're Off	Keri Wannamaker-Flamm	
2012	The Mentalist	Dana Martin	One episode
2012	Bad Girls	Cate's Mom	TV movie
2013	See Dad Run	Gigi McGinley	One episode
2014	Mostly Ghostly: Have You Met My Girlfriend?	Harriet Doyle	Video
2014	Mission Air	Diane Ireland	
2015	Safelight	Lillian	
2016	Diagnosis Delicious	Vivian Stevens	TV movie
2017	No Tomorrow	Gloria	3 episodes
2018	Nightclub Secrets	Barbara	TV movie
2019	No Good Nick	Presley	2 episodes
2019	Christmas Reservations	Kay Griffin	TV movie
2024	Night Court	Katie	One episode
