= The Tuxedo Begins =

- 30 Rock episode
- Episode no.: Season 6 Episode 8
- Directed by: John Riggi
- Written by: Josh Siegal; Dylan Morgan
- Production code: 608
- Original air date: February 16, 2012

Guest appearances
- Will Forte as Paul L'astname; Steve Buscemi as Lenny Wosniak; Mr. Met as himself

Episode chronology
← Previous "Hey, Baby, What's Wrong"	Next → "Leap Day"
- 30 Rock season 6

"The Tuxedo Begins" is the eighth episode of the sixth season of the American television comedy series 30 Rock, and the 111th overall episode of the series. It was directed by John Riggi, and written by Josh Siegal and Dylan Morgan. The episode originally aired on NBC in the United States on February 16, 2012. Guest stars in this episode include Will Forte and Steve Buscemi.

In this episode, Jack Donaghy (Alec Baldwin) considers running for mayor of New York City after he is mugged on his way to work; Liz Lemon (Tina Fey) becomes frustrated by increasing disorderly behaviour on the subway, so she decides to get in on it by imitating a mentally ill elderly woman to scare people away; and Jenna Maroney (Jane Krakowski) and boyfriend Paul (Will Forte) consider living normally as a couple as a potential new fetish, but become concerned that they are in fact simply settling down.

== Plot ==
On her way to work, Liz Lemon (Tina Fey) is delayed by what she perceives to be the failure of other subway goers to observe basic social norms. In generalizing their behavior, Liz sees it as a sign of the breakdown of New York society. While she is complaining to Jack Donaghy (Alec Baldwin) about this in a call, his cell phone is stolen at knifepoint in a construction tunnel. Jack responds to his mugging by hiding in his office for days and organizing the wealthy to protect themselves from the apparently angry lower classes.

Shortly thereafter, Liz comes down with a cold and dons an elderly woman costume from one of The Girlie Show with Tracy Jordan sketches. To her amazement, she discovers that the getup causes people to avoid her on the subway, as they fear that she is sick and potentially mentally ill. Liz concludes that society rewards rulebreaking and anti-social behavior, so she escalates her imitation of an insane old woman to get more personal space in her day-to-day errands. Meanwhile, Jenna Maroney (Jane Krakowski) and her boyfriend Paul (Will Forte) consider that behaving like a normal couple may be a new fetish. This is inspired by Paul falling asleep instead of taking part in an evening of sexual adventure. The two embrace their new way of living with gusto.

Fearing that he needs to exercise control over the lower classes, Jack considers a run for mayor. Eventually, he ventures out with the help of Tracy Jordan (Tracy Morgan) to confront his fear of walking by the site of his mugging. Suddenly, Liz, in full costume, approaches him to borrow money and a startled Jack throws her in a pile of garbage bags. When the crowd reacts positively to his apparent conquest of the old woman that had been terrorizing the subway, both Jack and Liz come to realize that New Yorkers do cheer those that uphold order after all. Finally, Jenna and Paul reach the realization that their normal behaviour is not a fetish and rather a sign that they are beginning to settle down. They resolve to take a "sexual walkabout" for three months to make sure they are ready.

The plot of this episode closely paralleled elements from the Dark Knight trilogy. The episode's title is a reference to Batman Begins.

== Reception ==
=== Critical reception ===
Meredith Blake of The A.V. Club scored this episode a B, writing that she hoped the story would continue with Jack running for mayor and also expressing interest in the Jenna C-plot: "I hope that their relationship can withstand their sexual walkabout, but I’m also pretty excited to see what comes of it (so to speak)." In Entertainment Weekly, Breia Brissey writing that she loves Will Forte, but the Jenna plot was "lost on" her. Writing for Uproxx, Alan Sepinwall writing that he liked the flipped roles in Jenna's relationship and he also liked Jack and Liz interacting with New York City landmarks. A 2020 review of the best 30 Rock episodes by Caroline Framke of Variety ranked this 28th for letting "Fey unleash Liz at her least ashamed, culminating in a dramatic standoff between her and Jack in which she goes full Joker while coughing up a lung and a half".

A flashback gag of Steve Buscemi's character Lenny Wosniak appearing undercover as an unconvincing high-schooler greeting "How do you do, fellow kids?" became an internet meme illustrating personalities and companies out of touch with their targeted audiences; the meme first appeared in 2012. In 2021, Buscemi paid homage to his character by dressing in the get-up for Halloween while giving away treats in his Park Slope neighborhood.

=== Ratings ===
According to the Nielsen Media Research, this episode of 30 Rock was watched by 3.59 million households in its original American broadcast. It earned a 1.5 rating/4 share in the 18–49 demographic.
