= Hey, Baby, What's Wrong =

- 30 Rock episodes
- Episode nos.: Season 6 Episodes 6/7
- Directed by: Michael Engler
- Written by: Kay Cannon
- Production code: 606/607
- Original air date: February 9, 2012

Guest appearances
- James Marsden as Criss Chros; Mary Steenburgen as Diana Jessup; Kristen Schaal as Hazel Wassername; Dean Winters as Dennis Duffy; Chris Parnell as Dr. Leo Spaceman; Billy Bush as himself; Erik Jensen as Cjokula

Episode chronology
← Previous "Today You Are a Man"	Next → "The Tuxedo Begins"
- 30 Rock season 6

"Hey, Baby, What's Wrong" is the sixth and seventh episode of the sixth season of the American television comedy series 30 Rock, and the 109th and 110th overall episode of the series. It was directed by Michael Engler and written by Kay Cannon. The episode originally aired on NBC in the United States on February 9, 2012. Guest stars in this episode include James Marsden, Mary Steenburgen, and Kristen Schaal.

In this hour-long episode, Liz Lemon (Tina Fey) tries to have the first good Valentine's Day of her life with boyfriend Criss (James Marsden); Jack Donaghy (Alec Baldwin) and his mother-in-law (Mary Steenburgen) go to the United Nations to attempt getting his wife out of North Korea; Pete Hornberger (Scott Adsit) tries to help Jenna Maroney (Jane Krakowski) have a successful live singing performance; Kenneth Parcell (Jack McBrayer) trains his page replacement (Kristen Schaal); and Tracy Jordan (Tracy Morgan) and Frank Rossitano (Judah Friedlander) try to show how Lutz (John Lutz) can find a date despite his undesirability.

== Plot ==
Criss (James Marsden) wants to cook Liz Lemon (Tina Fey) a great Valentine's Day dinner. The two head to an IKEA to buy a dining room table together (the "Kurtz", a reference to a character in Joseph Conrad's Heart of Darkness). In the store, they join other couples arguing over the furniture as metaphors for their respective relationships. Jack Donaghy and his mother-in-law, Diana (Mary Steenburgen), go to the United Nations to try getting Avery back from North Korea. Throughout the day, the two bond over the things they have in common and battle sexual tension due to their mutual attraction.

Pete Hornberger (Scott Adsit) tries to prepare Jenna Maroney (Jane Krakowski) for her first live singing performance on America's Kidz Got Singing, where everyone is hoping that she will crash and burn following her cruel comments as a judge. Jenna can't sing well due to "the yips" that Pete, a former archer, diagnoses her with (as he too suffered from them at the 1984 Olympic trials). She eventually has a solid performance, as Pete realizes she needs pain to distract her from the pressure to sing well. He shoots her with an arrow from a cupid prop to help her perform successfully. Meanwhile, Kenneth Parcell (Jack McBrayer) trains his page replacement, Hazel (Kristen Schaal), who is horrified upon realizing how rude the people who work at TGS are. She is discouraged until she sees how amazing Liz's life is, which makes her feel ready to work as a page at the show.

Tracy Jordan (Tracy Morgan) and Frank Rossitano (Judah Friedlander) decide to teach Lutz (John Lutz) "jerk"-esque ways to pick up emotionally vulnerable women. He tries them all out, but fails. Lutz realizes he still had a great time hanging out with Tracy and Frank all day, while they discover they have neglected their own respective partners. Liz resigns herself to the notion that she has lost another boyfriend, only to return home and find that Criss has cooked her an amazing Valentine's Day dinner. He tells her that he wasn't upset about their argument and that he does not mind when they disagree. Finally, Jack and Diana find a way to deal with their sexual tension by vigorously hitting the driving range together.

== Reception ==
According to the Nielsen Media Research, this episode of 30 Rock was watched by 3.88 million households in its original American broadcast. It earned a 1.6 rating/4 share in the 18–49 demographic. This means that it was seen by 1.6 percent of all 18- to 49-year-olds, and 4 percent of all 18- to 49-year-olds watching television at the time of the broadcast.

Overall, the episode received mixed reviews from critics. Alan Sepinwall of HitFix opined that "Double-length comedy episodes are hard to pull off, particularly on a show as joke-driven as 30 Rock is [...] and while there were funny moments because it's 30 Rock and they're talented and it's almost always funny at some point, on the whole, [the episode] dragged." However, he complimented the performances of Mary Steenburgen and Alec Baldwin, and commended their United Nations plot line as "the kind of broad, clever satire 30 Rock does so well." Nathan Rabin of The A.V. Club was particularly negative toward the episode, calling it a "disconcertingly dreadful Valentine’s Day episode of 30 Rock that luxuriates in a bubble bath of sour misanthropy for an interminable hour." He awarded it a C−.
