= Amy Lippman =

American television writer and producer

- Other name: Amy Flender
- Education: Harvard University
- Spouse: Rodman Flender
- Relatives: Timothée Chalamet (nephew); Pauline Chalamet (niece)

Amy Lippman is an American television writer and producer known for Party of Five (1994–2000)

== Biography ==
Lippman grew up in Los Angeles and San Francisco. She attended Harvard College, where she studied English. In a playwriting class, Lippman met her future writing partner Christopher Keyser, who was a student at Harvard Law School at the time. They both graduated in 1985 and moved to New York City, where Lippman wrote for soap operas such as Santa Barbara and Loving and Keyser was a speechwriter for political figures (including the 1988 presidential candidate and Arizona governor Bruce Babbitt) and wrote screenplays.

In 1988, Lippman and Keyser moved to Los Angeles with their future spouses and became known as a television writing duo by 1989. After working as writers for the shows L.A. Law (1986–1994) and Sisters (1991–1996), Lippman and Keyser were asked by Fox to develop a series about young orphans, which became Party of Five (1994–2000), a primetime drama that aired on for six seasons. In 1996, Party of Five won the Golden Globe Award for Best Drama Series. Lippman and Keyser received the Humanitas Prize for the episode "Thanksgiving", in which the main characters confront the drunk driver that was responsible for their parent's deaths.

Lippman also worked with Keyser also developed the television dramas Significant Others (1998) and Time of Your Life (1999–2000), a spin-off of Party of Five starring Love Hewitt's character Sarah leaving San Francisco in favor of New York and searching for the biological family she never even knew she had.

Lippman has since worked on a variety of shows, including In Treatment (2008–2010) and Masters of Sex (2013–2016), a Showtime series based on the sex researchers William Masters and Virginia Johnson for which Lippman served as executive producer. She oversaw the 2020 reboot of Party of Five, which dealt with immigration. In 2023, it was announced that she would be writer and showrunner for a television adaption of Three Identical Strangers.

== Personal life ==
Lippman is married to American actor, writer, director, and producer Rodman Flender. Together, they have one son, Haskell Flender, who was named after cinematographer Haskell Wexler. Her nephew by marriage is Academy Award-nominated actor Timothée Chalamet. She is politically conscious and has donated to Democratic candidates and causes.

== Awards ==
- 1995 Humanitas Prize for Party of Five with Christopher Keyser.
