= Christopher Keyser =

American screenwriter

- Born: Christopher Adam Keyser; 1960 (age 65–66); Long Island, New York
- Children: 2

Christopher Adam Keyser (born 1960) is an American producer and writer of primetime dramas. He is best known for creating the television series The Society and Party of Five.

== Early life ==
Keyser grew up in Merrick, a hamlet on Long Island, New York, in a Jewish family. He attended Harvard College, where he was president of the Harvard University Debate Council. He became involved in theater during his last two years, and appeared in Harvard College theatrical productions. He went on to Harvard Law School, from which he graduated with honors and received offers of employment from various New York City law firms.

While Keyser was in law school, he took a playwriting class where he met future writing partner Amy Lippman, then an undergraduate English student. Keyser and Lippman formed a writing partnership in New York City after their graduation in 1985, where Lippman wrote for soap operas such as Santa Barbara and Loving and Keyser worked as a lawyer as well as a speechwriter for political figures including 1988 presidential candidate Bruce Babbitt.

== Career ==
In 1988, Keyser and Lippman moved to Los Angeles, California and were signed on to write teleplays for L.A. Law and Equal Justice. From 1991 to 1996, they also wrote for and produced the shows Sisters and Eddie Dodd. Keyser and Lippman became known as an established team in the TV business.

He and Lippman are best known for being the creators, executive producers, and writers of the primetime family-oriented soap opera Party of Five, which aired for six seasons on Fox from 1994 to 2000. The show depicts the Salinger family's adolescent and young adult children working to stay afloat after their parents are killed by a drunk driver, maintaining the family restaurant and pursuing their own careers, with the eldest son serving as head of the family and eldest daughter pursuing professional writing career while the youngest daughter musical prodigy.

In 1996, the show won the Golden Globe Award for Best Drama Series. Keyser (along with Lippman) received the Humanitas Prize for the episode "Thanksgiving", in which the Salingers confront the mysterious drunk driver that was responsible for their parent's deaths. Actress Neve Campbell, who got her breakout role on the show, has referred to the show as "the most realistic show on television."

Keyser and Lippman continued to develop TV programs including Significant Others (1998) and Time of Your Life (1999–2000), a spin-off of Party of Five starring Love Hewitt's character Sarah leaving San Francisco in favor of New York and searching for the biological family she never even knew she had.

In October 2013, it was announced that Keyser and Sydney Sidner were writing the script for a reboot of Charmed, which was in development at CBS. Keyser and Sidner were also going to executive produce the reboot alongside CBS Television Studios and The Tannenbaum Company. However, in August 2014, it was revealed that CBS was not going ahead with the reboot, although the reboot finally came to fruition in 2018 on The CW with Jennie Snyder Urman, Jessica O'Toole, and Amy Rardin replacing Keyser.

From 2011 through 2015, Kayser was president of the Writers Guild of America, West.

Keyser was the creator, writer, and executive producer of the Netflix mystery drama, The Society, which premiered on May 10, 2019. The series received positive reviews; on July 9, 2019, it was renewed for a second season, which was set to be released in 2020. However, on August 21, 2020, Netflix reneged on the renewal deal and canceled the series, citing complications of the COVID-19 pandemic having led to cost increases and difficulty scheduling production. Keyser was the showrunner of the 2022 HBO series Julia starring Sarah Lancashire as chef Julia Child.

== Personal life ==
Christopher Keyser married Susan Sprung, a friend from high school, after they reconnected while attending law school. They have one daughter and one son, and reside in Los Angeles, California. Their daughter Madeline Sprung-Keyser acted in the movie 13 Going On 30.
