= Ken Topolsky =

American film producer

- Born: August 1, 1951 (age 73)
- Occupation(s): Director, producer and music production manager
- Years active: 1983–present

Ken Topolsky is an American film producer, television director and music production manager.

== Career ==
Topolsky began his career working as a music production manager for music producer Phil Ramone. Together they worked with the artists Billy Joel, Karen Carpenter and Simon & Garfunkel. In 1983, he served as music co-ordinator for the film Flashdance (1983) and music supervisor for the television film The Last Fling (1987) starring John Ritter and Connie Sellecca.

Topolsky moved on to television, producing the films Bates Motel (1987) and Desert Rats (1988). In 1989, he produced the feature film The Wizard starring Fred Savage. He would reunite with Savage becoming one of the producers of The Wonder Years and went to direct eleven episodes of the series. In 1990 and 1991 he shared Primetime Emmy nominations for Outstanding Comedy Series for his work on The Wonder Years.

Topolsky's other directorial television credits include Party of Five and the spin-off Time of Your Life. After the latter show ended in 2000, he has focused more on showrunning television series namely MDs, Clubhouse, Kevin Hill, 3 lbs, Kidnapped and Scoundrels. As of 2013, he is a producer on the relaunched Dallas.

Ken Topolsky is currently an Executive Producer attached to the Taylor Sheridan's series 1923
