= Party of Five =

American television series (1994–2000)

- Genre: Family drama; Teen drama
- Created by: Christopher Keyser; Amy Lippman
- Starring: Scott Wolf; Matthew Fox; Neve Campbell; Lacey Chabert; Scott Grimes; Paula Devicq; Jennifer Love Hewitt; Michael Goorjian; Alexondra Lee; Jeremy London; Jennifer Aspen
- Opening theme: "Closer to Free" by BoDeans
- Country of origin: United States
- Original language: English
- No. of seasons: 6
- No. of episodes: 142 (list of episodes)

Production
- Executive producers: Christopher Keyser; Amy Lippman; Ken Topolsky; P.K. Simonds; Bruce J. Nachbar; Mark B. Perry; John Romano; Mitchell Burgess; Robin Green
- Producers: Paul Marks; P. K. Simonds; Bruce J. Nachbar; Steven Robman; Daniel Attias; Ian Biederman; Allan Heinberg
- Editors: Richard Freeman; Steve Potter; David Dworetzky
- Running time: 43–45 minutes
- Production companies: Keyser/Lippman Productions; Columbia Pictures Television (1994–1997) (seasons 1–3); Columbia TriStar Television (1997–2000) (seasons 4–6)

Original release
- Network: Fox
- Release: September 12, 1994 – May 3, 2000

Related
- Time of Your Life

Party of Five is an American teen and family drama television series created by Christopher Keyser and Amy Lippman that originally aired on Fox from September 12, 1994, to May 3, 2000, with a total of six seasons consisting of 142 episodes. The series featured an ensemble cast led by Scott Wolf as Bailey, Matthew Fox as Charlie, Neve Campbell as Julia, and Lacey Chabert as Claudia Salinger, who with their baby brother Owen (played by several actors) constitute five siblings whom the series follows after the loss of their parents in a car accident. Notable co-stars included Scott Grimes, Paula Devicq, Michael Goorjian, Ben Browder, Jeremy London, and Jennifer Love Hewitt. While categorized as a series aimed at teenagers and young adults, Party of Five explored several mature themes, including substance and domestic abuse, teen pregnancy, mental illness, cancer, and the long-term effects of parental loss.

Despite receiving positive reviews from television critics after its debut, including TV Guide naming it "The Best Show You're Not Watching" in 1995, the series suffered from low ratings during its first and second seasons, during which speculation arose that it would soon be cancelled. In 1996, Party of Five won the Golden Globe Award for Best Television Series – Drama, after which ratings and popularity grew for the majority of the remainder of the series.

A spin-off, Time of Your Life, starring Hewitt, debuted on Fox on October 25, 1999, and was cancelled after one season and 19 episodes.

== Synopsis ==
The show, set in San Francisco, centered on the five Salinger siblings (the "party of five" of the show's title), who become orphans after their parents are killed in a car accident caused by a drunk driver. The family is composed of 24-year-old Charlie (Matthew Fox), the eldest, a womanizing, immature manual laborer who struggles with the responsibility of being the new head of the family; 16-year-old Bailey (Scott Wolf), the once-rebellious teen forced into a role of responsible caretaker and later veering into alcoholism; 15-year-old Julia (Neve Campbell), a sensitive teen; 11-year-old Claudia (Lacey Chabert), a precocious child prodigy musician; and baby Owen, age one.

The siblings take over the running of their family's restaurant, Salinger's. Charlie initially serves as bartender and manager, and later Bailey takes over. Over the years, the Salingers face various struggles: the long-term effects of parental loss; in season three, Bailey's attempt to recover from alcoholism; in season four, Charlie's diagnosis with cancer; and in season five, Julia's dealing with domestic violence in a relationship.

As the series progressed, romantic relationships became plot points and new cast members joined the show, including Jennifer Love Hewitt as Sarah, Bailey's girlfriend; Jeremy London as Griffin, Julia's "bad-boy" boyfriend and later husband; and Paula Devicq as Kirsten, Owen's nanny, who develops an on-again-off-again relationship with Charlie throughout the series, until they get married during the show's sixth and final season.

== Cast and characters ==
=== Cast timeline ===
Actor	Character	Seasons					
Actor	Character	1	2	3	4	5	6
Scott Wolf	Bailey Salinger	Main	Main	Main	Main	Main	Main
Matthew Fox	Charlie Salinger	Main	Main	Main	Main	Main	Main
Neve Campbell	Julia Salinger	Main	Main	Main	Main	Main	Main
Lacey Chabert	Claudia Salinger	Main	Main	Main	Main	Main	Main
Paula Devicq	Kirsten Bennett Salinger	Main (Note: Devicq departs in "Poor Substitutes" (ep. 2.13). She returns in a recurring role from "Spring Breaks" (ep. 2.21).)	Main	Recurring	Recurring	Main	Main
Scott Grimes	Will McCorkle	Main	Main	Recurring	Guest	Guest	Main (Note: Grimes returns to the opening credits from "Wrestling Demons" (ep. 6.4).)
Jennifer Love Hewitt	Sarah Reeves Merrin		Main (Note: Hewitt departs in "Bye, Bye, Love" (ep. 6.3).)	Main	Main	Main	Main
Michael Goorjian	Justin Thompson	Recurring	Main	Recurring	Guest	Guest	Recurring
Alexondra Lee	Callie Martel			Main (Note: Lee is added to the opening credits in "Not So Fast" (ep. 3.8), before departing in "Promises, Promises" (ep. 3.23).)			
Jeremy London	Griffin Chase Holbrook	Guest (Note: James Marsden initially plays the character in "The Ides of March" (ep. 1.22).)	Recurring	Recurring	Main	Main	Main
Jennifer Aspen	Daphne Jablonsky				Recurring	Recurring	Main

Cast notes

=== Main ===
- Scott Wolf as Bailey Salinger; the second-born sibling who is forced to grow up fast after growing up as a rebellious teenager and deal with life after his parents' deaths. He is 16 at the start of the series, 21 at its conclusion.
- Matthew Fox as Charlie Salinger; the eldest sibling who struggles to live his own life in the reluctant role of legal guardian to his brothers and sisters. Immature and insecure, he dropped out of college his senior year to "find himself" and was planning to re-enroll when his parents' deaths made him his siblings' legal guardian. He is 24 at the start of the series, 30 at its conclusion.
- Neve Campbell as Julia Salinger; a highly intelligent, emotionally sensitive teen who struggles to adjust to being an orphan and having more family responsibilities. She is 15 at the start of the series, 20 at its conclusion.
- Lacey Chabert as Claudia Salinger; a gifted violinist struggling to build a life for herself and also deal with being an orphan. She is 11 at the start of the series, 17 at its conclusion.
- Paula Devicq as Kirsten Bennett Salinger (seasons 1–2, 5–6, recurring seasons 2–4); a graduate student who is hired as Owen Salinger's nanny and becomes romantically involved with Charlie off-and-on during the series, eventually marrying him by season six and being pregnant with their first child by the end of the series.
- Scott Grimes as Will McCorkle (seasons 1–2, 6, recurring seasons 3–5); Bailey's best friend from high school.
- Michael Goorjian as Justin Thompson (season 2, recurring seasons 1, 3–6); Julia's friend, and later off-and-on boyfriend, during the series.
- Jennifer Love Hewitt as Sarah Reeves Merrin (seasons 2–6); Bailey's sensitive, off-and-on girlfriend from high school who struggles to "find herself" after she finds out that she was adopted.
- Alexondra Lee as Callie Martel (season 3); Bailey's roommate and girlfriend during his freshman year at college.
- Jeremy London as Griffin Chase Holbrook (seasons 4–6, recurring seasons 2–3); A moody and troubled teenager whom Julia dates, and later marries and divorces. Older brother of Jill Holbrook, Bailey's ex-girlfriend who dies from a drug overdose. The character was originally portrayed by James Marsden in the first-season finale episode.
- Jennifer Aspen as Daphne Jablonsky (season 6, recurring seasons 4–5); a part-time stripper who becomes briefly romantically involved with Charlie and later has his baby.

=== Recurring ===
The following lists all actors who appeared in five or more episodes during the run of the show.

- Owen Salinger, the youngest sibling was recast three times as the character grew. He was played by Alexander and Zachary Ahnert in the pilot episode, Brandon and Taylor Porter as an infant, Andrew and Stephen Cavarno as a preschooler, and Jacob Smith as a school-age child until the end of the show. He is 1 at the start of the series, 6 at its conclusion.
- Tom Mason as Joe Mangus (seasons 1–6); co-owner of the family restaurant Salinger's, who grew up with their father Nick in an orphanage, taking over as full-time owner after Nick's death. He also often acts as a father figure to the children.
- Mitchell Anderson as Ross Werkman (seasons 1–6); a professional violinist and Claudia's personal violin tutor and friend.
- Cari Shayne as Nina DiMayo (seasons 1–2); Julia's rebellious, outgoing friend from high school.
- Jennifer Blanc as Kate Bishop (season 1); Bailey's first girlfriend from high school.
- Michael Shulman as Artie Baum (season 1); Claudia's friend from elementary school, a fellow child violinist.
- David Burke as Bill (season 1); Owen's part-time nanny.
- Megan Ward as Jill Holbrook (season 1); Bailey's outgoing and troubled girlfriend, younger sister of Griffin Holbrook.
- Kathleen Noone as Ellie Bennett (seasons 2–3, 6); Kirsten's mother.
- Marla Sokoloff as Jody Lynch (seasons 2–3); Claudia's troublemaking friend from junior high school.
- Alyson Reed as Mrs. Reeves (seasons 2–5); Sarah's adoptive mother.
- Carroll O'Connor as Jacob "Jake" Gordon (seasons 2–3); the Salingers' maternal grandfather, father of their deceased mother, Diana Gordon Salinger.
- Brenda Strong as Kathleen Isley (season 2); a wealthy TV producer whom Charlie dates. When Charlie broke up with her after feeling like a "kept man", she maliciously uses her wealth to nearly close down the family restaurant.
- Tamara Taylor as Grace Wilcox (season 3); a social worker and peer counselor who briefly becomes Charlie's girlfriend. She also runs a successful election campaign to become a city councilwoman.
- Ben Browder as Sam Brody (season 3); a construction worker who briefly becomes Julia's boyfriend.
- Dan Lauria as Coach Russ Petrocelli (season 3); Bailey's wrestling coach during his first year at college.
- Jackie Mari Roberts as Marcia (season 3); Grace's co-worker, who later works for Grace's city council election campaign.
- Andrew Keegan as Reed Isley (season 4); a high-school football player whom Claudia has a crush on and pursues.
- Paige Turco as Annie Mott (season 4); a divorced single mother who briefly becomes Bailey's girlfriend.
- Allison Bertolino as Natalie Mott (season 4); Annie's young daughter.
- Jessica Lundy as Nina Rondstadt (season 4); a zoologist who briefly becomes Charlie's girlfriend.
- Tim DeKay as Dr. Paul Thomas (seasons 4–5); Kirsten's husband, who then becomes her ex-husband.
- Brenda Wehle as Dr. Stephanie Rabin (seasons 4–5); Charlie's oncologist during his cancer treatments.
- Ever Carradine as Rosalie (season 4); a garage co-worker with whom Griffin cheats on Julia.
- Ross Malinger as Jamie Burke (seasons 4–5); Claudia's friend and later love interest, who is the son of a rival restaurant owner.
- Scott Bairstow as Ned Grayson (seasons 5–6); Julia's boyfriend during her first year at Stanford who later abuses her.
- Heather McComb as Maggie (season 5); Julia's college roommate who dated Ned before he cheated on her with Julia.
- Adam Scott as Josh Macon (season 5); one of Julia's friends at college and Julia's crush.
- Joanna Garcia as Hallie (season 5); a classmate of Claudia's at her New England boarding school.
- Lynsey Bartilson as Parker Brookes (season 5); a classmate of Claudia's at her New England boarding school.
- Chad Todhunter as Cody (seasons 5–6); Claudia's troubled boyfriend from the band that she joins with Griffin.
- Kyle Secor as Evan Stilman (season 6); Julia's writing editor with whom she becomes briefly romantically involved.
- Maggie Lawson as Alexa (season 6); a cheerleader friend of Claudia's.
- Andrew Levitas as Cameron Welcott (season 6); Alexa's football-player boyfriend who becomes romantically involved with Claudia.
- Wilson Cruz as Victor (season 6); Daphne's gay friend who works as her daughter's nanny, and later works as Owen's nanny for the Salingers.
- Lauren Ambrose as Myra Wringler (season 6); a troubled high school student who clashes with Charlie.
- Rhona Mitra as Holly Marie Beggins (season 6); an English pre-med student who becomes Bailey's girlfriend.
- Charles Esten as Luke Sheppard (season 6); Daphne's boyfriend who's in the U.S. Army.
- Sean Maher as Adam Matthews (season 6); an aspiring writer who briefly dates Julia.
- Thomas Ian Nicholas as Todd Marsh (season 6); Claudia's boyfriend who works as a session musician and is a fellow violinist.

== Production ==
Fox Entertainment Group chairman Sandy Grushow commissioned the show as a possible replacement for Beverly Hills, 90210, which was then in its fourth season. Grushow stated that "I wanted a show that would possess many of the same values that '90210' had in the beginning. A show about teenagers and for teenagers. I pitched the notion of a group of kids who lost their parents in a tragic accident and therefore were forced to raise themselves."

When Christopher Keyser and Amy Lippman came on board to create the show, they disliked the more lighthearted premise the network had come up with, essentially of a bunch of teens without parents left to go wild, which Keyser called a "Don't Tell Mom the Babysitter's Dead kind of thing." They decided to take the show in a more dramatic direction, where the characters have to deal with the serious repercussions of being orphaned and growing up.

Jerry O'Connell was initially offered the role of Bailey, but he chose to sign with the series Sliders instead. Scott Wolf auditioned and was cast the very same day, the first of the actors to be cast. Neve Campbell, who was still living in Canada at the time, auditioned for Party of Five while she was in Los Angeles interviewing with different talent agencies to represent her. She auditioned along with her then-roommate Tara Strong, and ended up winning the role of Julia and moving to Los Angeles for the show, after it was picked up by Fox for a full series.

The show was produced by Columbia Pictures Television (CPT) and High Productions. CPT would later be folded into Columbia TriStar Domestic Television, which soon afterward became Sony Pictures Television.

=== Nielsen ratings ===
Season	Episodes	Timeslot (ET)	Season Premiere	Season Finale	Rank	Rating (Households)	Viewers (in millions)
1	22	Monday 9:00 Wednesday 9:00	September 12, 1994	March 15, 1995	#125	6.2	—N/a
2	22	Wednesday 9:00	September 27, 1995	March 27, 1996	#96	7.1	—N/a
3	25	Wednesday 9:00	August 21, 1996	April 2, 1997	#82	7.4	—N/a
4	24	Wednesday 9:00	September 17, 1997	May 13, 1998	#56	—N/a	11.5
5	25	Wednesday 9:00	September 16, 1998	May 19, 1999	#65	7.2	—N/a
6	24	Tuesday 9:00 Wednesday 9:00	October 5, 1999	May 3, 2000	#113	4.3	6.135

== Episodes ==
Season	Episodes	Originally released	
Season	Episodes	First released	Last released
1	22	September 12, 1994	March 15, 1995
2	22	September 27, 1995	March 27, 1996
3	25	August 21, 1996	April 2, 1997
4	24	September 17, 1997	May 13, 1998
5	25	September 16, 1998	May 19, 1999
6	24	October 5, 1999	May 3, 2000

== Home media ==
On April 27, 1999, Columbia TriStar Home Video released the season 2 episode "The Wedding", the season 3 episode "Intervention", and the season 4 episode "Richer, Poorer, Sickness, and Health" on VHS.

Sony Pictures Home Entertainment released all six seasons of Party of Five on DVD in Region 1 between 2004 and 2013.

In August 2013, it was announced that Mill Creek Entertainment had acquired the rights to various television series from the Sony Pictures library including Party of Five. They subsequently re-released season 1 on DVD on June 24, 2014, followed by season 2 on January 6, 2015. On January 5, 2016, Mill Creek released a complete series set featuring all six seasons of the series, available together for the first time.

In January 2016, it was announced that Hulu had acquired the rights to every episode of the series.

In 2021, it was announced by a Sony representative that the show had been remastered in 4K HDR quality. The show's remastered version was made available for streaming in multiple Prime Video regions starting in 2022, although only in 1080p quality thus far.

DVD name	Ep #	Region 1	Region 2	Region 4	DVD Special Features
The Complete 1st Season	22	May 4, 2004; June 24, 2014 (re-release)	Sept, 25 2006	May 5, 2006; June 7, 2017 (re-release)	Audio Commentary on Selected Episodes. "Party of Five: A Family Album", 17 minutes of a documentary about the shows first 4 seasons. 9 Behind the Scenes Featurettes with the Cast and Crew (On Original DVD Release Only)
The Complete 2nd Season	22	December 20, 2005; January 6, 2015 (re-release)	Sept, 3 2007	February 14, 2007; June 7, 2017 (re-release)	Audio Commentary on Selected Episodes. Documentary on the Series featuring Jennifer Love Hewitt. (On Original DVD Release Only)
The Complete 3rd Season	25	March 25, 2008	N/A	June 7, 2017	Minisodes
The Complete 4th Season♦	24	March 5, 2013	N/A	June 7, 2017	None
The Complete 5th Season♦	25	July 2, 2013	N/A	June 7, 2017	None
The Complete 6th and Final Season♦	24	October 1, 2013	N/A	June 7, 2017	None
The Complete Series	142	January 5, 2016	N/A	November 1, 2017	"Party of Five: A Family Album", the complete 44 minute documentary.

♦ - Manufacture-on-Demand (MOD) release.

== Critical reception ==
For the show's first season, review aggregator website Rotten Tomatoes reported an approval rating of 85% based on 13 critic reviews, with an average rating of 6.4/10. The website's critics consensus reads, "A sincere family drama full of tear-jerking moments, Party of Five excels at its authentic depiction of young adult issues."

== Awards and nominations ==
Award	Year	Category	Nominee(s)	Result	Ref.
ALMA Awards	2000	Emerging Actor in a Drama Series	Wilson Cruz	Won	
Casting Society of America	1995	Best Casting for Pilot Episode	Mary V. Buck and Susan Edelman for "Pilot"	Nominated	
GLAAD Media Award	2000	Outstanding TV Individual Episode	"I'll Show You Mine"	Nominated	
GLAAD Media Award	1996	Outstanding Television Series		Nominated	
Golden Globe Awards	1997	Best Television Series - Drama		Nominated	
Golden Globe Awards	1996	Best Television Series - Drama		Won	
Humanitas Prize	1998	60 Minute Category	Christopher Keyser and Amy Lippman for "Before and After"	Nominated	
Humanitas Prize	1996	60 Minute Category	Christopher Keyser and Amy Lippman for "Thanksgiving"	Won	
Kids' Choice Awards	2000	Favorite Television Actress	Jennifer Love Hewitt	Nominated	
Primetime Emmy Awards	1996	Outstanding Sound Editing for a Series	"The Wedding"	Nominated	
Teen Choice Awards	1999	TV – Choice Actor	Scott Wolf	Nominated	
Teen Choice Awards	1999	TV – Choice Actress	Neve Campbell	Nominated	
Teen Choice Awards	1999	TV – Choice Actress	Jennifer Love Hewitt	Nominated	
Teen Choice Awards	1999	TV – Choice Drama		Nominated	
Writers Guild of America Awards	1997	Television: Episodic Drama	Mark B. Perry for "Falsies"	Nominated	
Young Artist Awards	1999	Best Performance in a TV Drama or Comedy Series - Leading Young Actress	Lacey Chabert	Won	
YoungStar Awards	1998	Best Performance by a Young Actress in a Drama TV Series	Lacey Chabert	Won	
YoungStar Awards	1997	Best Performance by a Young Actress in a Drama TV Series	Lacey Chabert	Won	

== Reboot ==
In January 2018, Freeform ordered a pilot for a reboot of Party of Five, featuring five children who must take care of themselves after their parents are deported back to Mexico. In April 2020, the reboot was canceled after one season.

== In popular culture ==
Party of Five is credited with "[moving] televised stories about and targeted at young adults away from the soap-opera genre and [helping to] make the medium safer for the more realistic teenagers we’d meet later on Dawson’s Creek, Freaks and Geeks, Friday Night Lights, and Gilmore Girls."

In 2021, Party of Five was one of the shows featured in the third episode of season 1 of Vice Media's Dark Side of the 90s entitled "TV for Teens."

== Adaptation ==
In April 2026, it was announced that this show is being adapted in Hindi under Yash Patnaik's production house Beyond Dreams Entertainment for Sony SAB titled as Kyunki Papa Kehte Hain and will star Khushi Dubey and Raj Anadkat in lead roles.
