= List of films: X–Z =

indexed lists of films
0–9	A	B	C	D	E	F
G	H	I	J–K	L	M	N–O
P	Q–R	S	T	U–V–W	X–Y–Z	

This is an alphabetical list of film articles (or sections within articles about films). It includes made for television films. See the talk page for the method of indexing used.

== X ==
- X (1986)
- X (1996)
- X (2002)
- X (2022)
- X: Night of Vengeance (2011)
- The X from Outer Space (1967)
- X: Past Is Present (2015)
- X: The Man with the X-ray Eyes (1963)
- X: The Unheard Music (1986)
- X-15 (1961)
- X500 (2016)
- X2000 (1998)
- X+Y (2014)
- X-Cross (2007)
- The X-Files (1998)
- The X-Files: I Want to Believe (2008)
- X Games 3D: The Movie (2009)
- X-Large (2011)
- X Marks the Spot (1931)
- X Marks the Spot (1942)
- X-Men series:
  - X-Men (2000)
  - X2 (2003)
  - X-Men: The Last Stand (2006)
  - X-Men Origins: Wolverine (2009)
  - X-Men: First Class (2011)
  - X-Men: Days of Future Past (2014)
  - X-Men: Apocalypse (2016)
  - X-Men: Dark Phoenix (2019)
- The X from Outer Space (1967)
- X-Paroni (1964)
- X=Prem (2022)
- X Ray: The Inner Image (2019)
- X-Ray of a Lie (2004)
- The X-Rays (1897)
- X the Unknown (1956)
- X Videos (2018)
- X & Y (2018)
- X to Y (2009)
- X Y & Zee (1972)
- Xagoroloi Bohudoor (1995)
- Xala (1975)
- Xanadu (1980)
- XChange (2000)
- XCU: Extreme Close Up (2001)
- Xcuse Me (2003)
- Xenia (2014)
- Xennials (2021)
- Xeno (2025)
- Xenoa (2007)
- Xenogenesis (1978)
- Xero (2010)
- Xero Error (2010)
- The Xi'an Incident (1981)
- Xiao Shan Going Home (1995)
- Xiao Wu (1997)
- Xica (1976)
- XIII: The Conspiracy (2008)
- Xime (1994)
- Xingu (2011)
- Xinnian Is Coming – Uproar of Chuxi (2015)
- Xira (2019)
- Xiu Xiu: The Sent Down Girl (1998)
- XL - Extra Large (2008)
- XOXO (2016)
- The Xposé (2014)
- XS: The Worst Size (2003)
- XTC: This Is Pop (2017)
- Xtinction: Predator X (2010)
- Xtra (2004)
- Xtreme (2021)
- Xtreme (2025)
- Xtro series:
  - Xtro (1983)
  - Xtro II: The Second Encounter (1991)
  - Xtro 3: Watch the Skies (1995)
- Xuanzang (2016)
- Xuxa Abracadabra (2003)
- Xuxa e os Duendes (2001)
- Xuxa e os Duendes 2 - No Caminho das Fadas (2002)
- Xuxa em O Mistério de Feiurinha (2009)
- Xuxa Gêmeas (2006)
- Xuxa Popstar (2000)
- Xuxa Requebra (1999)
- Xuxa em Sonho de Menina (2007)
- Xuxa e o Tesouro da Cidade Perdida (2004)
- Xuxinha e Guto contra os Monstros do Espaço (2005)
- XX (2017)
- XX: Beautiful Beast (1995)
- XX: Beautiful Hunter (1994)
- XX: Beautiful Prey (1996)
- XX/XY (2002)
- XXL (1997)
- XXX series:
  - XXX (2002)
  - XXX: State of the Union (2005)
  - XXX: Return of Xander Cage (2017)
  - XXX 4 (TBD)
- xxxHolic: A Midsummer Night's Dream (2005)
- xxxHolic (2022)
- XXXY (2000)
- XXY (2008)
- X/Y (2014)

== Y ==
- Y: (2017 & 2022)
- Y Mabinogi (2003)
- Y que patatín...y que patatán (1971)
- Y Tu Mamá También (2001)
- Y2K (1999 & 2024)
- YZ (2016)

=== Ya ===
- Ya nunca más (1984)
- Ya Rab (2014)
- Ya tiene comisario el pueblo (1936)
- Ya veremos (2018)
- Ya Ya (2013)

==== Yaa ====
- Yaaba (1989)
- Yaad Rahe (1940)
- Yaad Rakhegi Duniya (1992)
- Yaadein (1964, 2001)
- Yaadgaar: (1970 & 1984)
- Yaadhavam (1993)
- Yaadhumagi Nindraai (2020)
- Yaadon Ki Baaraat (1973)
- Yaadon Ki Kasam (1985)
- Yaakkai (2017)
- Yaamirukka Bayamey (2014)
- Yaan (2014)
- Yaana (2019)
- Yaanai Mel Kuthirai Sawaari (2016)
- Yaanum Theeyavan (2017)
- Yaar? (1985)
- Yaar Anmulle Returns (2021)
- Yaar Annmulle (2011)
- Yaar Baash (2006)
- Yaar Gaddar (1994)
- Yaar Mera (1972)
- Yaar Meri Zindagi (2008)
- Yaar Nee? (1966)
- Yaar Paiyyan (1957)
- Yaar Pardesi (2012)
- Yaara o Dildaara (2011)
- Yaara Dildara (1991)
- Yaara Silly Silly (2015)
- Yaaradi Nee Mohini (2008)
- Yaaram (2019)
- Yaaran Naal Baharan (2005)
- Yaarana: (1981 & 2015)
- Yaare Koogadali (2012)
- Yaare Neenu Cheluve (1998)
- Yaarige Saluthe Sambala (2000)
- Yaariyan: (2008 & 2014)
- Yaaro Ezhuthiya Kavithai (1986)
- Yaaron Ka Yaar (1977)
- Yaaron Ki Baraat (2018)
- Yaaruda Mahesh (2013)
- Yaarukkaga Azhudhaan (1966)
- Yaarukku Theriyum (2012)
- Yaaruku Yaaro (2007)
- Yaathrayude Anthyam (1989)
- Yaava Janmada Maitri (1972)

==== Yac–Yal ====
- Yachakan (1951)
- The Yacht Isabel Arrived This Afternoon (1949)
- Yacht of the Seven Sins (1928)
- Yachts and Hearts, or The Opium Smugglers (1918)
- Yackety Yack (1974)
- The Yacoubian Building (2006)
- Yad Vashem: Preserving the Past to Ensure the Future (1989)
- Yadana (2006)
- Yadanabon (1953)
- Yadvi – The Dignified Princess (2017)
- Yaen? (1970)
- Yagam: (1982 & 2010)
- Yagaswam (1978)
- Yagavarayinum Naa Kaakka (2015)
- Yagnam (1992)
- Yagnam (2004)
- Yagyū Ren'yasai: Hidentsuki Kageshō (1956)
- Yahaan (2005)
- Yahaan Sabki Lagi Hai (2015)
- Yahaluvo (2007)
- Yahan Ameena Bikti Hai (2016)
- Yahşi Batı (2010)
- Yahudi (1958)
- Yahudi Ki Ladki: (1933 & 1957)
- Yai Nee Romba Azhaga Irukke (2002)
- Yaiskulgee Pakhang Angaoba (2012)
- Yajamana: (2000 & 2019)
- Yaji and Kita series:
  - Yaji and Kita: The Battle of Toba Fushimi (1928)
  - Yaji and Kita: The Midnight Pilgrims (2005)
  - Yaji and Kita: Yasuda's Rescue (1927)
- Yajilarra (2007)
- Yaju-deka (1982)
- Yak: The Giant King (2012)
- Yakada Pihatu (2003)
- Yakeen: (1969 & 2005)
- Yakov Sverlov (1940)
- Yaksha: Ruthless Operations (2022)
- Yakshagaanam (1976)
- Yakshi (1968)
- Yakshi – Faithfully Yours (2012)
- Yakshi Paaru (1979)
- Yakshiyum Njanum (2010)
- The Yakuza (1974)
- Yakuza Apocalypse (2015)
- Yakuza Deka (1970)
- Yakuza Graveyard (1976)
- Yakuza Princess (2021)
- Yakuza Weapon (2011)
- Yakuza's Law: Yakuza Keibatsushi: Rinchi (1969)
- Yale vs. Harvard (1927)
- Yalghaar (2017)
- Yalkae, a Joker in High School (1977)
- Yalom's Cure (2014)
- Yalu Malu Yalu 2 (2018)

==== Yam ====
- Yam Daabo (1986)
- Yam Yasothon (2005)
- Yama Raja Siri (2018)
- Yama—Attack to Attack (1985)
- Yamada: The Samurai of Ayothaya (2010)
- Yamagola (1977)
- Yamagola Malli Modalayindi (2007)
- Yamaho Yama (2012)
- Yamakasi (2001)
- Yamakinkarudu (1982)
- Yamaleela (1994)
- Yamaleela 2 (2014)
- Yaman (2017)
- Yamanam (1992)
- Yamanukku Yaman (1980)
- Yamashita: The Tiger's Treasure (2001)
- Yamata (1919)
- Yamata no Orochi no Gyakushū (1985)
- Yamato (2005)
- Yamato: The New Voyage (1979)
- Yambaó (1957)
- Yamini (1973)
- Yamiutsu shinzo (2005)
- Yamla Jat (1940)
- Yamla Pagla Deewana series:
  - Yamla Pagla Deewana (2011)
  - Yamla Pagla Deewana 2 (2013)
  - Yamla Pagla Deewana: Phir Se (2018)
- Yamraaj (1998)
- Yamudiki Mogudu (1988)
- Yamudiki Mogudu: Ee Nela Thakkuvodu (2012)
- Yamuna (2013)

==== Yan ====
- Yan Thu (2018)
- Yana's Friends (1999)
- Yanai Paagan (1960)
- Yandé Codou, la griotte de Senghor (2008)
- Yang ± Yin: Gender in Chinese Cinema (1996)
- Yangtse Incident: The Story of H.M.S. Amethyst (1957)
- The Yank (2014)
- A Yank in Australia (1942)
- A Yank on the Burma Road (1942)
- A Yank Comes Back (1949)
- A Yank in Ermine (1955)
- A Yank at Eton (1942)
- A Yank in Indo-China (1952)
- A Yank in Korea (1951)
- A Yank in Libya (1942)
- A Yank at Oxford (1938)
- A Yank in the R.A.F. (1941)
- A Yank in Rome (1946)
- A Yank in Viet-Nam (1964)
- Yankee (1966)
- Yankee Buccaneer (1952)
- The Yankee Clipper (1927)
- The Yankee Consul (1924)
- Yankee Don (1931)
- Yankee Dood It (1956)
- Yankee Doodle in Berlin (1919)
- Yankee Doodle Boy (1929)
- Yankee Doodle Bugs (1954)
- Yankee Doodle Daffy (1943)
- Yankee Doodle Dandy (1942)
- The Yankee Doodle Mouse (1943)
- Yankee Dudler (1973)
- Yankee Fakir (1947)
- The Yankee Girl (1915)
- A Yankee Go Getter (1921)
- Yankee Pasha (1954)
- Yankee Pluck (1917)
- A Yankee Princess (1919)
- The Yankee Señor (1926)
- Yankee Speed (1924)
- The Yankles (2009)
- Yanks (1979)
- Yanks Ahoy (1943)
- The Yanks Are Coming: (1942 & 1963)
- Yanky Clippers (1929)

==== Yao–Yaz ====
- Yao (2018)
- Yaps and Yokels (1919)
- The Yaqui Cur (1913)
- Yaqui Drums (1956)
- The Yaqui Girl (1910)
- Yar Manamagan? (1961)
- Yaraana (1995)
- Yardie (2018)
- The Yards (2000)
- Yare Nee Abhimani (2000)
- Yari Dushmani (1980)
- Yarın Ağlayacağım (1986)
- Yarınsız Adam (1976)
- Yarukku Maappillai Yaro (1975)
- Yarukku Sontham (1963)
- Yarukkum Vetkam Illai (1975)
- Yasak Aşk (1961)
- Yaşam Kavgası (1978)
- Yaşamak Ne Güzel Şey (1969)
- Yasemin (1988)
- Yash (1996)
- Yashoda Krishna (1975)
- Yasmin: (1955 & 2004)
- Yasmina (1927)
- Yasukuni (2007)
- Yatchan (2015)
- Yateem (1988)
- Yatheem (1997)
- Yathra (1985)
- Yathra Chodikkathe (2016)
- Yathrakarude Sradhakku (2002)
- Yathrakkoduvil (2013)
- Yathumaagi (2010)
- Yatra: (2007 & 2019)
- Yatrik (1952)
- Yatterman (2009)
- Yauwan (1973)
- Yavanika (1982)
- Yavarum Nalam (2009)
- Yavvanam Katesindi (1976)
- Yaya and Angelina: The Spoiled Brat Movie (2009)
- Yayathi (1938)
- Yazawin Yine Thu Myar (2017)

=== Ye ===
- Ye Happy Pilgrims (1934)
- Ye Maaya Chesave (2010)
- Ye Mantram Vesave (2013)
- Ye Olde Minstrels (1941)
- Ye Olden Days (1933)
- Ye Re Ye Re Paisa (2018)
- Ye Stupid Pyar (2011)
- Ye Wooing of Peggy (1917)

==== Yea ====
- Yea Toh Two Much Ho Gayaa (2016)
- Yeah Right! (2003)
- The Year 01 (1973)
- A Year Ago in Winter (2008)
- A Year Along the Abandoned Road (1991)
- Year of the Carnivore (2009)
- A Year and Change (2015)
- Year of the Comet (1992)
- Year at Danger (2007)
- A Year in the Death of Jack Richards (2004)
- Year of the Devil (2002)
- Year of the Dog (2007)
- The Year of the Dog (1994)
- Year of the Dogs (1997)
- The Year Dolly Parton Was My Mom (2011)
- Year of the Dragon (1985)
- Year of Enlightment (1986)
- The Year of the Everlasting Storm (2021)
- Year of the Fish (2007)
- Year of Freedom. Mariupol After DNR (2015)
- The Year of Getting to Know Us (2008)
- Year of the Gun (1991)
- A Year and a Half in the Life of Metallica (1992)
- The Year of the Hare (1977)
- Year of the Horse (1997)
- Year of the Jellyfish (1984)
- The Year of Living Dangerously (1982)
- Year as Long as Life (1966)
- The Year of the Mouse (1965)
- The Year My Parents Went on Vacation (2006)
- The Year My Voice Broke (1987)
- Year of the Nail (2007)
- A Year of the Quiet Sun (1984)
- Year One (2009)
- The Year of the Rabbit (1987)
- Year by the Sea (2016)
- The Year of Sir Ivor (1969)
- The Year of Spectacular Men (2017)
- The Year of the Tiger (2011)
- A Year Toward Tomorrow (1966)
- The Year We Thought About Love (2015)
- A Year Without Love (2005)
- The Year Without a Santa Claus: (1974 TV & 2006 TV)
- The Year of the Wolf (2007)
- The Year of the Yao (2004)
- The Yearling: (1946 & 1994)
- Yearning: (1964, 1990 & 1993)
- Yearning to Belong (2007)
- Years of the Beast (1981)
- The Years Between (1946)
- The Years of the Locust (1916)
- The Years Pass (1945)
- Yeats Country (1965)

==== Yed–Yei ====
- Yedanthasthula Meda (1980)
- Yedi Evlat İki Damat (1973)
- Yedyanchi Jatra (2012)
- Yeelen (1987)
- Yeh Aag Kab Bujhegi (1991)
- Yeh Adam (1986)
- Yeh Desh (1984)
- Yeh Dil (2003)
- Yeh Dil Aap Ka Huwa (2002)
- Yeh Dil Aashiqanaa (2002)
- Yeh Dil Kisko Doon (1963)
- Yeh Dillagi (1994)
- Yeh Dooriyan (2011)
- Yeh Faasley (2011)
- Yeh Gulistan Hamara (1972)
- Yeh Hai Bakrapur (2014)
- Yeh Hai Chakkad Bakkad Bumbe Bo (2003)
- Yeh Hai India (2017)
- Yeh Hai Jalwa (2002)
- Yeh Hai Mumbai Meri Jaan (1999)
- Yeh Hui Na Mardon Wali Baat (2000)
- Yeh Ishq Nahin Aasaan (1984)
- Yeh Jawaani Hai Deewani (2013)
- Yeh Jo Mohabbat Hai (2012)
- Yeh Kaisi Mohabbat (2002)
- Yeh Khula Aasmaan (2012)
- Yeh Kya Ho Raha Hai? (2002)
- Yeh Lamhe Judaai Ke (2004)
- Yeh Mera India (2008)
- Yeh Mohabbat Hai (2002)
- Yeh Nazdeekiyan (1982)
- Yeh Raaste Hain Pyaar Ke (2001)
- Yeh Raat (2000)
- Yeh Raat Phir Na Aayegi: (1966 & 1992)
- Yeh Rastey Hain Pyar Ke (1963)
- Yeh Saali Zindagi (2011)
- Yeh Sunday Kyun Aata Hai (2014)
- Yeh Teraa Ghar Yeh Meraa Ghar (2001)
- Yeh To Kamaal Ho Gaya (1982)
- Yeh Vaada Raha (1982)
- Yeh Wada Raha (2003)
- Yeh Woh Manzil To Nahin (1987)
- Yeh Zindagi Ka Safar (2001)
- Yeh Zindagi Kitni Haseen Hai (1966)
- Yehi Hai Zindagi (1977)
- Yeidhavan (2017)

==== Yel ====
- Yella (2007)
- Yelling to the Sky (2011)
- Yellow: (1998, 2006 feature, 2006 short, 2012 & 2014)
- The Yellow Arm (1921)
- Yellow Asphalt (2000)
- The Yellow Back (1926)
- The Yellow Balloon (1953)
- A Yellow Bird (2016)
- The Yellow Bird (2001)
- The Yellow Birds (2018)
- The Yellow Cab Man (1950)
- Yellow Caesar (1941)
- The Yellow Cameo (1928)
- Yellow Canary (1943)
- The Yellow Canary (1963)
- Yellow Cargo (1936)
- The Yellow Claw (1921)
- Yellow Contraband (1928)
- Yellow Crow (1957)
- The Yellow Death (1920)
- The Yellow Diplomat (1920)
- The Yellow Division (1954)
- The Yellow Dog (1918)
- Yellow Dust (1936)
- Yellow Earth (1984)
- Yellow Face (2010)
- Yellow Fin (1951)
- Yellow Fingers (1926)
- The Yellow Flag (1937)
- Yellow Flowers on the Green Grass (2015)
- The Yellow Foal (1913)
- The Yellow Handkerchief: (1977 & 2008)
- Yellow Hair (1999)
- Yellow Hair 2 (2001)
- Yellow Hair and the Fortress of Gold (1984)
- Yellow Is Forbidden (2018)
- Yellow Jack (1938)
- Yellow Lily (1928)
- The Yellow Mask (1931)
- The Yellow Mountain (1954)
- The Yellow Passport (1916)
- The Yellow Pawn (1916)
- The Yellow Rolls-Royce (1964)
- The Yellow Rose of Texas (1944)
- Yellow Sands (1938)
- The Yellow Sea (2010)
- Yellow Sky (1948)
- Yellow Star (1922)
- The Yellow Star: The Persecution of the Jews in Europe 1933-45 (1980)
- Yellow Sticky Notes (2007)
- Yellow Stockings (1928)
- Yellow Submarine (1968)
- The Yellow Teddy Bears (1963)
- The Yellow Ticket (1918)
- The Yellow Ticket (1928)
- The Yellow Tomahawk (1954)
- The Yellow Typhoon (1920)
- The Yellow Wallpaper (2011)
- The Yellowback (1929)
- Yellowbeard (1983)
- Yellowbird (2014)
- YellowBrickRoad (2010)
- Yellowknife (2002)
- Yellowneck (1955)
- Yellowstone (1936)
- Yellowstone Kelly (1959)
- Yeltsin: Three Days in August (2011)

==== Yem–Yev ====
- Yemaali (2018)
- Yemaatrathe Yemaaraathe (1985)
- Yemaindi Ee Vela (2010)
- Yemen: The Silent War (2018)
- Yenda Thalaiyila Yenna Vekkala (2018)
- Yengeç Sepeti (1994)
- Yennai Arindhaal (2015)
- Yennamo Yedho (2014)
- Yentl (1983)
- The Yeomen of the Guard (1978)
- Yerma (1984)
- Yerma (1998)
- Yerra Mandaram (1991)
- Yes (2004)
- Yes (2025)
- Yes Boss (1997)
- Yes Day (2021)
- Yes Madam (2003)
- Yes Man (2008)
- The Yes Man (1991)
- The Yes Men (2003)
- The Yes Men Are Revolting (2014)
- The Yes Men Fix the World (2009)
- Yes, My Darling Daughter (1939)
- Yes Nurse! No Nurse! (2002)
- Yes Sir, Mr. Bones (1952)
- Yes Sir, That's My Baby (1949)
- Yes Your Honour (2006)
- Yes, But... (2001)
- Yes, Giorgio (1982)
- Yes, God, Yes (2019)
- Yes, Madam: (1933, 1942 & 1985)
- Yes, Madam? (1939)
- Yes, Mr Brown (1933)
- Yes, My Love (1953)
- Yes or No (2010)
- Yes or No? (1920)
- Yes, we fuck! (2015)
- Yes, We Have No Bonanza (1939)
- Yes, Yes, Nanette (1925)
- Yes, Yes, Women Are My Weakness (1929)
- Yesa (2017)
- Yesenia (1971)
- Yeshwant (1997)
- Yessongs (1975)
- Yesterday: (1959, 1981, 1985, 2002, 2004 & 2019)
- Yesterday Girl (1966)
- The Yesterday Machine (1963)
- Yesterday Once More: (2004 & 2016)
- Yesterday, Today, Tomorrow (2011)
- Yesterday, Today and Tomorrow (1963)
- Yesterday Was a Lie (2008)
- Yesterday Was Spring (1955)
- Yesterday's Enemy (1959)
- Yesterday's Guys Used No Arsenic (1976)
- Yesterday's Hero (1979)
- Yesterday's Heroes (1940)
- Yesterday's Wife (1923)
- Yesteryou, Yesterme, Yesterday (1993)
- Yeti Obhijaan (2017)
- Yeti: Curse of the Snow Demon (2008 TV)
- Yeti: Giant of the 20th Century (1977)
- Yeti: A Love Story (2006)
- Yeto Vellipoyindhi Manasu (2012)
- Les Yeux cernés (1964)
- Les Yeux jaunes des crocodiles (2014)
- Yeva (2017)
- Yevade Subramanyam (2015)
- Yevadu (2014)

=== Yi–Yn ===
- Yi Yi (2000)
- A Yiddish World Remembered (2002)
- Yiddle with Her Fiddle (1936)
- Yield to the Night (1956)
- Yıkılmayan Adam (1977)
- Yin Bat Htae Ka Dar (2017)
- The Yin-Yang Master: Dream of Eternity (2020)
- The Yin Yang Master 2 (2003)
- The Yin and the Yang of Mr. Go (1970)
- The Yinyang Master (2021)
- Yip Yip Yippy (1939)
- Yippee (2006)
- Yira, yira (1931)
- Yitzhak Rabin: A Biography (2004)
- Yksityisalue (1962)
- Ynav Bosseba (1968)

=== Yo ===
- Yo (2015)
- Yo... el aventurero (1959)
- Yo Ho Ho (1981)
- Yo, indocumentada (2013)
- Yo maté a Facundo (1975)
- Yo Maya Ko Sagar (2000)
- Yo mimo soy (2014)
- Yo no elegí mi vida (1949)
- Yo no soy esa (2024)
- Yo pecador (1959)
- Yo quiero ser hombre (1950)
- Yo quiero ser tonta (1950)
- Yo soy Boricua, pa'que tu lo sepas! (2006)
- Yo soy tu padre (1927)
- Yo, también (2009)
- Yo también tengo fiaca (1978)
- Yo-Kai Watch series:
  - Yo-kai Watch: The Movie (2014)
  - Yo-kai Watch: Enma Daiō to Itsutsu no Monogatari da Nyan! (2015)
  - Yo-kai Watch: Soratobu Kujira to Double no Sekai no Daibōken da Nyan! (2016)
  - Yo-kai Watch Shadowside: Oni-ō no Fukkatsu (2017)
  - Yo-kai Watch: Forever Friends (2018)
- Yo Yo (1965)
- The Yo-Yo Gang (1992)
- Yo-Yo Girl Cop (2006)
- Yo Yo Honey Singh: Famous (2024)

==== Yoa–Yot ====
- Yoake no Machi de (2011)
- Yob, or The Last Brain Cell (2006)
- Yobi, the Five Tailed Fox (2007)
- Yoddha: (1992)
- Yoddha: The Warrior (2009)
- Yodelin' Kid from Pine Ridge (1937)
- Yodeling Yokels (1931)
- Yodha: (1991, 2009 & 2024)
- Yodok Stories (2008)
- Yoel, Israel & Pashkavils (2006)
- Yoga Hakwon (2009)
- Yoga Hosers (2016)
- Yogamullaval (1971)
- Yogera (2010)
- Yogi: (2007 & 2009)
- The Yogi (1916)
- Yogi Bear series:
  - Yogi's Ark Lark (1972 TV)
  - Yogi's First Christmas (1980 TV)
  - Yogi's Great Escape (1987 TV)
  - Yogi Bear and the Magical Flight of the Spruce Goose (1987 TV)
  - Yogi and the Invasion of the Space Bears (1988 TV)
  - Yogi the Easter Bear (1994 TV)
  - Yogi Bear (2010)
- Yogi Vemana (1947)
- Yogiri yo Kon'yamo Arigatō (1967)
- Yohan: The Child Wanderer (2010)
- Yohwa Eoludong (1987)
- Yojimbo (1961)
- Yojōhan monogatari: Shōfu shino (1966)
- Yokai Monsters series:
  - Yokai Monsters: 100 Monsters (1968)
  - Yokai Monsters: Spook Warfare (1968)
  - Yokai Monsters: Along with Ghosts (1969)
- A Yoke of Gold (1916)
- The Yoke's on Me (1944)
- Yokel Boy (1942)
- Yol (1982)
- Yolanda (1924)
- Yolanda and the Thief (1945)
- Yolki series:
  - Yolki (2010)
  - Yolki 2 (2011)
  - Yolki 3 (2013)
  - Yolki 1914 (2014)
  - Yolki 5 (2016)
  - Yolki 6 (2017)
  - Yolki 7 (2018)
- The Yolk's on You (1980)
- Yolngu Boy (2001)
- YOLO (2024)
- Yoma Paw Kya Tae Myet Yay (2019)
- Yomeddine (2018)
- Yomigaeri (2002)
- Yona (2014)
- Yona Yona Penguin (2009)
- Yondiradi Kuydiradi (2011)
- Yongary, Monster from the Deep (1967)
- Yonggary (1999)
- Yonkers Joe (2008)
- Yonna in the Solitary Fortress (2006)
- Yoo-Hoo, Mrs. Goldberg (2009)
- Yoogan (2015)
- Yor, the Hunter from the Future (1983)
- Yor-yor (1964)
- Yoroi Samurai Zombie (2008)
- Yorokobi mo kanashimi mo ikutoshitsuki (1957)
- Yoru no Kamome (1957)
- Yoru no kiba (1958)
- Yosemite (2015)
- Yoshiwara (1920)
- Yoshiwara (1937)
- Yossi (2012)
- Yossi & Jagger (2002)
- Yotsuya Kaidan (1956)

==== You–Yoy ====
- You: (2007 & 2009)
- You Again (2010)
- You Are Here: (2010 & 2018)
- You Are on Indian Land (1969)
- You Are My Home (2020)
- You Are My Love (1941)
- You Are My Sassy Girl (2014)
- You Are My Sunshine: (2005 & 2015)
- You Are Not Alone (1978)
- You Are Not My Mother (2021)
- You Are So Not Invited to My Bat Mitzvah (2023)
- You Belong to Me: (1934 & 1941)
- You Can Count on Me (2000)
- You Can't Always Tell (1915)
- You Can't Cheat an Honest Man (1939)
- You Can't Escape Forever (1942)
- You Can't Get Away with Murder (1939)
- You Can't Kill Stephen King (2012)
- You Can't Run Forever (2024)
- You Can't Stop the Murders (2003)
- You Can't Take It With You (1938)
- You Don't Know What You're Doin'! (1931)
- You Don't Mess with the Zohan (2008)
- You Got Served (2004)
- You Hurt My Feelings: (2011 & 2023)
- You and I: (1938 & 2008)
- You, the Living (2007)
- You I Love (2004)
- You, John Jones! (1943)
- You Kill Me (2007)
- You Know My Name (1999 TV)
- You Lucky Dog (1998 TV)
- You and Me: (1938 & 2005)
- You, Me and Dupree (2006)
- You & Me Forever (2012)
- You, Me & Her (2025)
- You, Me and Him: (2007 & 2017)
- You and Me Are Three (1962)
- You, Me & Tuscany (2026)
- You Might Be the Killer (2018)
- You Nazty Spy! (1940)
- You and the Night (2013)
- You Only Live Once: (1937, 1952 & 2017)
- You Only Live Twice (1967)
- You Ought to Be in Pictures (1940)
- You People (2023)
- You Ruined My Life (1987 TV)
- You Said a Mouthful (1932)
- You Should Have Left (2020)
- You So Crazy (1994)
- You Were Like a Wild Chrysanthemum (1955)
- You Were Never Lovelier (1942)
- You Were Never Really Here (2018)
- You Will Be My Son (2011)
- You Will Be My Wife (1932)
- You Will Die at Twenty (2019)
- You Will Meet a Tall Dark Stranger (2010)
- You Wish! (2003 TV)
- You Won't Be Alone (2022)
- You, Your, Yours (2018)
- You'd Be Surprised (1926)
- You'd Be Surprised! (1930)
- You'll Be in My Heart (1930)
- You'll Find Out (1940)
- You'll Get Over It (2002)
- You'll Like My Mother (1972)
- You'll Never Be Alone (2016)
- You'll Never Find Me (2023)
- You'll Never Get Rich (1941)
- You'll Never See Me Again (1973 TV)
- You're a Big Boy Now (1966)
- You're Cordially Invited (2025)
- You're Darn Tootin' (1928)
- You're Dead (1999)
- You're the Doctor (1938)
- You're an Education (1938)
- You're Fired (1919)
- You're Gonna Miss Me (2005)
- You're in the Army Now (1941)
- You're in the Navy Now (1951)
- You're a Lucky Fellow, Mr. Smith (1943)
- You're Killing Me (2023)
- You're Killing Me Susana (2016)
- You're Missing the Point (1940)
- You're My Boss (2015)
- You're My Everything (1949)
- You're My Pet (2011)
- You're Never Too Young (1955)
- You're Next (2011)
- You're Nobody 'til Somebody Kills You (2011)
- You're Not Built That Way (1936)
- You're Not So Tough (1940)
- You're Not You (2014)
- You're the One: (1941 & 2000)
- You're Only Young Once (1937)
- You're Only Young Twice (1952)
- You're Out of Luck (1941)
- You're a Sap, Mr. Jap (1942)
- You're Still the One (2015)
- You're a Sweetheart (1937)
- You're Telling Me (1942)
- You're Telling Me! (1934)
- You're Ugly Too (2015)
- You're on Your Own (1959)
- You've Got to Be Smart (1967)
- You've Got Mail (1998)
- You've Got Me By the Wing (1953)
- You've Got This (2020)
- You've Got to Walk It Like You Talk It or You'll Lose That Beat (1971)
- Young Adam (2003)
- Young Adult (2011)
- Young Ahmed (2019)
- The Young Americans (1993)
- The Young Animals (1968)
- The Young Baron Neuhaus (1934)
- Young Bess (1953)
- Young Billy Young (1969)
- The Young Black Stallion (2003)
- Young Blood: (1926 & 1932)
- The Young Blood Chronicles (2014)
- Young and Dangerous series:
  - Young and Dangerous (1996)
  - Young and Dangerous 2 (1996)
  - Young and Dangerous 3 (1996)
  - Young and Dangerous 4 (1997)
  - Young and Dangerous 5 (1998)
- Young Detective Dee: Rise of the Sea Dragon (2013)
- Young Doctors in Love (1982)
- Young Dr. Kildare (1938)
- Young Einstein (1988)
- The Young, the Evil and the Savage (1968)
- Young Frankenstein (1974)
- Young Friend Forever (2014)
- The Young Fritz (1943)
- The Young Girls of Rochefort (1967)
- Young Goethe in Love (2010)
- Young Guns (1988)
- Young Guns II (1990)
- Young at Heart: (1954, 1987 & 1995)
- Young@Heart (2008)
- Young Hearts: (1936, 1944 & 1953)
- Young and Innocent (1937)
- The Young Lieutenant (2005)
- The Young Lovers: (1954 & 1964)
- Young Man with a Horn (1950)
- The Young Man and Moby Dick (1979)
- The Young Master (1980)
- The Young Messiah (2016)
- Young Mr. Lincoln (1939)
- Young Nowheres (1929)
- The Young Nurses (1973)
- The Young One: (1960 & 2016)
- The Young Philadelphians (1959)
- The Young Poisoner's Handbook (1995)
- Young Policemen in Love (1995)
- The Young Savages (1961)
- Young Sherlock Holmes (1985)
- Young Törless (1966)
- The Young Victoria (2009)
- Young Washington (2026)
- Young Winston (1972)
- Young Wives' Tale (1951)
- Youngblood: (1978, 1986, & 2025)
- Youngblood Hawke (1964)
- Youngistaan (2014)
- Your Best Friend (1922)
- Your Friends & Neighbors (1998)
- Your Highness (2011)
- Your Lie in April (2016)
- Your Monster (2024)
- Your Mother Your Mother Your Mother (2026)
- Your Name (2016)
- Your Safety First (1956)
- Your Sister's Sister (2011)
- Your Studio and You (1996)
- Yours (2010)
- Yours Emotionally (2006)
- Yours, Mine, and Ours: (1968 & 2005)
- Yours Truly: (2018 & 2019)
- Yourself and Yours (2016)
- Youth: (1917, 1922, 1934, 2002, 2013, 2015 & 2017)
- Youth of the Beast (1963)
- Youth of China (1937)
- Youth in Revolt (2010)
- Youth Takes a Fling (1938)
- Youth Will Be Served (1940)
- Youth Without Youth (2007)
- Youvanam (1974)
- Yoyes (2000)
- Yoyo and Nene, the Little Witch Sisters (2013)

=== Yp–Yv ===
- Ypres (1925)
- Yrrol (1994)
- Yu (2003)
- Yu-Gi-Oh! series:
  - Yu-Gi-Oh! (1999)
  - Yu-Gi-Oh! The Movie: Pyramid of Light (2004)
  - Yu-Gi-Oh!: Bonds Beyond Time (2010)
  - Yu-Gi-Oh!: The Dark Side of Dimensions (2016)
- Yu Ming Is Ainm Dom (2003)
- Yucatán (2018)
- Yuddha Bhoomi (1988)
- Yuddha Kaanda (1989)
- Yuddham: (1984 & 2014)
- Yuddham Sei (2011)
- Yuddham Sharanam (2017)
- Yuddho (2005)
- Yudh (1985)
- Yudhabhoomi (1976)
- Yudham (1983)
- Yudhpath (1992)
- Yug Dekhi Yug Samma (1991)
- Yuga (2006)
- Yuga Purusha (1989)
- Yuga Purushudu (1978)
- Yugandhar (1979)
- Yugant (1995)
- Yuganthaya (1983)
- Yugapurushan (2010)
- Yugo & Lala series:
  - Yugo & Lala (2012)
  - Yugo & Lala 2 (2014)
  - Yugo & Lala 3 (2016)
- Yuhi Kabhi (1994)
- Yukon Flight (1940)
- Yukon Gold (1952)
- Yukon Manhunt (1951)
- Yukon Vengeance (1954)
- Yuma: (1971 & 2012)
- Yumeji (1991)
- Yummy (2019)
- Yun Hota Toh Kya Hota (2006)
- Yung Mung Sung (2019)
- Yuppi du (1975)
- The Yuppie Fantasia (1989)
- The Yuppie Fantasia 3 (2017)
- Yuri Nosenko: Double Agent (1986)
- Yuriko's Aroma (2010)
- Yuri's Day (2008)
- Yuva (2004)
- Yuvakudu (2000)
- Yuvan Yuvathi (2011)
- Yuvaraja (2001)
- Yuvaraju: (1982 & 2000)
- Yuvataram Pilicindi (1985)
- Yuvatha (2008)
- Yuvatharam Kadilindi (1980)
- Yuvathurki (1996)
- Yuvvraaj (2008)
- Yuwakusha (1989)
- Yūgure made (1980)
- Yves (2019)
- Yves Saint Laurent (2014)
- Yvette: (1928 & 1938)
- Yvette, the Fashion Princess (1922)
- Yvonne of the Night (1949)
- Yvonne from Paris (1919)

== Z ==
- Z (1969)
- Z (1999)
- Z (2019)
- Z Channel: A Magnificent Obsession (2004)
- Z Island (2015)
- Z.P.G. (1972)
- Z Storm (2014)
- Z for Zachariah (2015)
- ZMD: Zombies of Mass Destruction (2009)
- ZR-7 :The Red House Seven (2011)
- ZTS: State of Entropy (2002)

=== Za ===
- The Za-Bum Circus (1944)
- Za co? (1995)
- Za Gokiburi (1973)
- Za humny je drak (1982)
- Za La Mort (1924)
- Za svobodu národa (1920)
- Za trnkovým keřem (1980)
- Za volantem nepřítel (1974)

==== Zaa–Zam ====
- Zaalim (1994)
- The Zaarden Brothers (1918)
- Zaat (1972)
- Zabak (1961)
- Zabana! (2012)
- Zabardast (1985)
- Zabardast (2007)
- Zabata (1993)
- Zabawka (1933)
- Zabriskie Point (1970)
- Zach's Ceremony (2016)
- Zacharia Pothen Jeevichirippundu (2017)
- Zachariah (1971)
- Zack and Miri Make a Porno (2008)
- Zack and Reba (1998)
- Zack Snyder's Justice League (2021)
- Zadar! Cow from Hell (1989)
- Zadarski memento (1984)
- Zagar Pyaw Thaw Athe Hnalone (1968)
- Zaganella and the Cavalier (1932)
- Zahreelay (1990)
- Zai Jian Wo Men De Shi Nian (2015)
- Zaida, the Tragedy of a Model (1923)
- Zakazane piosenki (1946)
- Zakham (1989)
- Zakham (1994)
- Zakhm (1998)
- Zakhmee (1975)
- Zakhmee Insaan (1982)
- Zakhmi Aurat (1988)
- Zakhmi Dil: (1981 & 1994)
- Zakhmi Kunku (1995)
- Zakhmi Rooh (1993)
- Zakhmi Sher (1984)
- Zakhmi Sherni (2001)
- Zakhmi Sipahi (1994)
- Zakhmo Ka Hisaab (1993)
- Zakhmona (2017)
- Zakurozaka no Adauchi (2014)
- Zalim Saudagar (1941)
- Zalim Tera Jawab Nahin (1960)
- Zalzala (1988)
- Zalzalaa (2000)
- Zalzalaa En'buri Aun (2010)
- Zam Zam (TBD)
- Zama (2017)
- Zamaana Deewana (1995)
- Zamaanat (1977)
- Zamach stanu (1981)
- Zamana: (1985, 1993 & 2010)
- Zamane Ko Dikhana Hai (1981)
- Zamane Se Kya Darna (1994)
- Zamane Se Poocho (1976)
- Zamani Manzil Kay Maskharay (2017)
- Zamba (1949)
- Zambezia (2012)
- Zameen: (1943 & 2003)
- Zameen Aasmaan: (1946, 1972 & 1984)
- Zameen Aasman (1994)
- Zameen Kay Khuda (2004)
- Zameen Ke Tare (1960)
- Zameer (1975)
- Zameer: The Awakening of a Soul (1997)
- Zameer: The Fire Within (2005)
- Zamindar: (1952 & 1965)

==== Zan–Zaz ====
- Zana (2019)
- Zandalee (1991)
- Zander the Great (1925)
- La Zandunga (1938)
- Zandy's Bride (1974)
- Zangezur (1938)
- Zangiku monogatari (1956)
- Zanjeer: (1973, 1998 & 2013)
- Zanna Bianca e il grande Kid (1977)
- The Zany Adventures of Robin Hood (1984 TV)
- Zanzibar (1940)
- Zapata: The Dream of a Hero (2004)
- Zapata's Gang (1914)
- Los Zapaticos me Aprietan (1999)
- Zapatlela (1993)
- Zapatlela 2 (2013)
- Zapatos Viejos (1993)
- Zappa (1983)
- Zappatore (1980)
- Zapped (2014)
- Zapped! series:
  - Zapped! (1982)
  - Zapped Again! (1990)
- Zapping (1999)
- Zapruder film (1963)
- Zara Si Zindagi (1983)
- Zarafa (2012)
- Zarak (1956)
- Zardoz (1974)
- Zare (1926)
- Zaritsas: Russian Women in New York (2010)
- Zarkorr! The Invader (1996)
- Zaroorat (1972)
- Zarqa (1969)
- Zarra's Law (2014)
- Zatch Bell! Movie 2: Attack of Mechavulcan (2005)
- Zathura: A Space Adventure (2005)
- Zatoichi series:
  - Zatoichi the Fugitive (1963)
  - Zatoichi on the Road (1963)
  - Zatoichi and the Chest of Gold (1964)
  - Zatoichi's Flashing Sword (1964)
  - Zatoichi's Revenge (1965)
  - Zatoichi and the Doomed Man (1965)
  - Zatoichi and the Chess Expert (1965)
  - Zatoichi's Vengeance (1966)
  - Zatoichi's Pilgrimage (1966)
  - Zatoichi's Cane Sword (1967)
  - Zatoichi the Outlaw (1967)
  - Zatoichi Challenged (1967)
  - Zatoichi and the Fugitives (1968)
  - Zatoichi Meets Yojimbo (1970)
  - Zatoichi Goes to the Fire Festival (1970)
  - Zatoichi and the One-Armed Swordsman (1971)
  - Zatoichi at Large (1972)
  - Zatoichi: (1989 & 2003)
  - Zatoichi: The Last (2010)
- Zátopek (2021)
- Zavallılar (1974)
- Zaw Ka Ka Nay The (2009)
- Zay El Naharda (2008)
- Zaynab (1930)
- Zaynab, la rose d'Aghmat (2014)
- Zaytoun (2012)
- Zaza: (1915, 1923, 1939 & 1956)
- Zaza Rising (2017)
- Zazel (1996)
- Zazie in the Metro (1960)

=== Zd ===
- Zdroj (2005)

=== Ze ===
- Zea (1981)
- A Zealous Batman (1908)
- Zeb vs. Paprika (1924)
- The Zebra Force (1976)
- Zebra in the Kitchen (1965)
- Zebra Lounge (2001)
- Zebra Varakal (2017)
- Zebrahead (1992)
- Zebraman (2004)
- Zebraman 2: Attack on Zebra City (2010)
- Zed Plus (2014)
- A Zed & Two Noughts (1985)
- Zeder (1983)
- Zee and Co. (1972)
- Zeemansvrouwen (1930)
- De Zeemeerman (1996)
- Zeenat: (1945 & 1975)
- Zegen (1987)
- Zeher (2005)
- Zehreela Insaan (1974)
- Zeiram (1991)
- Zeisters (1986)
- Zeit der Störche (1971)
- Zeit der Wünsche (2005)
- Zeit zu leben (1969)
- Zeiten ändern dich (2010)
- Zeitgeist series:
  - Zeitgeist: The Movie (2007)
  - Zeitgeist: Addendum (2008)
  - Zeitgeist: Moving Forward (2011)
- Zelal (2010)
- Želary (2003)
- Zelda (1993 TV)
- Zelig (1983)
- Zelly and Me (1988)
- Zen: (2007 & 2009)
- The Zen of Bennett (2012)
- The Zen Diaries of Garry Shandling (2018)
- The Zen Diary (2022)
- Zen Noir (2006)
- Zenabel (1969)
- Zenda (2010)
- Zenda Swabhimanacha (2017)
- Zenigata Heiji: Ghost Lord (1954)
- Zenigata Heiji: Human-skin Spider (1956)
- Zenith (2010)
- Zenne Dancer (2012)
- Zenobia (1939)
- Zenon series:
  - Zenon: Girl of the 21st Century (1999 TV)
  - Zenon: The Zequel (2001 TV)
  - Zenon: Z3 (2004 TV)
- Zephyr (2010)
- Zepped (1916)
- Zeppelin (1971)
- Zero: (1928, 2009, 2010, 2016, 2018 & 2024)
- The Zero Boys (1986)
- Zero Charisma (2013)
- Zero Contact (2021)
- Zero for Conduct (1933)
- Zero Dark Thirty (2012)
- Zero Day: (2003 & 2020)
- Zero Days (2016)
- Zero Degree (2015)
- Zero Effect (1998)
- Zero Focus: (1961 & 2009)
- Zero Hour: (1944 & 1977)
- Zero Hour! (1957)
- The Zero Hour: (1939 & 2010)
- Zero Kelvin (1995)
- Zero Killed (2012)
- Zero Motivation (2014)
- Zero Patience (1993)
- Zero Point (2014)
- Zero Point Five Love (2014)
- Zero to Sixty (1978)
- The Zero Theorem (2013)
- Zero Tolerance: (1995, 1999 & 2015)
- Zero Woman series:
  - Zero Woman: Assassin Lovers (1996)
  - Zero Woman: The Accused (1997)
  - Zero Woman: The Hunted (1997)
  - Zero Woman: Dangerous Game (1998)
- The Zero Years (2005)
- Zero: Black Blood (2014)
- Zerograd (1989)
- Zerophilia (2005)
- Zeros and Ones (2021)
- Zeroville (2019)
- Zesshō (1958)
- Zeta One (1969)
- Zeus and Roxanne (1997)
- Zevar (1942)
- Zeven jongens en een oude schuit (1942)
- Zeyda and the Hitman (2004)
- Zeynep's Eight Days (2007)

=== Zh–Zn ===
- Zhagaram (2019)
- The Zhang Family's Daughter-in-Law (1985)
- Z'har (2009)
- Zhenya, Zhenechka and Katyusha (1967)
- Zhong Kui: Snow Girl and the Dark Crystal (2015)
- Zhou Yu's Train (2002)
- Zhuangzi Tests His Wife (1913)
- Zhukovsky (1950)
- zi (2026)
- Zibahkhana (2007)
- Zid: (1976 & 2014)
- Zidane: A 21st Century Portrait (2006)
- Ziddi: (1948, 1964, 1973, 1997 & 2013)
- Ziegfeld Follies (1946)
- Ziegfeld Girl (1941)
- Ziegfeld: The Man and His Women (1978 TV)
- Zielen Van Napels (2005)
- Zift (2008)
- Zig Zag: (1970 & 2002)
- Zigeunerweisen (1980)
- Ziggy Stardust and the Spiders from Mars (1973)
- Zigomar (1911)
- Zigomar Against Nick Carter (1912)
- Zigomar the Eelskin (1913)
- Zigzag (1963)
- The Zigzag Kid (2012)
- Zigzag of Success (1968)
- Zila Ghaziabad (2013)
- Zilch! (1989)
- Zille and Me (1983)
- Zim and Co. (2005)
- Zimbo (1958)
- Zimbo Comes To Town (1960)
- Zina (1985)
- Zinda (2006)
- Zinda Dil: (1975 & 2003)
- Zinda Laash (1967)
- Zinda Lash (1932)
- Zindagani (1986)
- Zindaggi Rocks (2006)
- Zindagi: (1940, 1964, 1976 & 1978)
- Zindagi 50-50 (2013)
- Zindagi Aur Toofan (1975)
- Zindagi Ek Juaa (1992)
- Zindagi Khoobsoorat Hai (2002)
- Zindagi aur Khwab (1961)
- Zindagi Kitni Haseen Hay (2016)
- Zindagi Na Milegi Dobara (2011)
- Zindagi Tere Naam (2012)
- Zindagi Zindagi (1972)
- Zingara (1969)
- Zingari (1920)
- Zion (2018)
- Zion and His Brother (2009)
- Zip, the Dodger (1914)
- Zip 'N Snort (1961)
- Zip & Zap and the Captain's Island (2016)
- Zip & Zap and the Marble Gang (2013)
- Zip 'n Zoo (2008)
- Zipang (1990)
- Zipper (2015)
- Zipperface (1992)
- Zipping Along (1953)
- Zis Boom Bah (1941)
- Ziva Postec: The Editor Behind the Film Shoah (2018)
- Zizek! (2005)
- Zkouška pokračuje (1959)
- Zlaté dno (1942)
- Zlatna levica, priča o Radivoju Koraću (2011)
- Zlatý podraz (2018)
- Zlé pondělí (1960)
- Zlepšovák (1960)
- Zločin a trik II. (1967)
- Znachor (1937)
- Znaki na drodze (1970)

=== Zo ===
- Zo Reken (2021)

==== Zod–Zol ====
- Zodiac (2007)
- The Zodiac (2005)
- The Zodiac Killer (1971)
- Zodiac Killer Project (2025)
- Zodiac Killers (1991)
- Zodiac Rapist (1971)
- Zodiac: Signs of the Apocalypse (2014)
- Zodiac: The Race Begins (2006)
- Zoe: (2001 & 2018)
- Zoeken naar Eileen (1987)
- Zoetrope (2011)
- Zoey 102 (2023)
- Zohi Sdom (2010)
- Zohra (1922)
- Zokkomon (2011)
- Zoku Aoi sanmyaku Yukiko no maki (1957)
- Zola (2020)
- Zoltan, Hound of Dracula (1978)
- Zolykha's Secret (2006)

==== Zom ====
- Zombeavers (2014)
- Zombi series:
  - Zombi (1978)
  - Zombi 2 (1979)
  - Zombi 3 (1988)
- Zombi Child (2019)
- Zombi Kampung Pisang (2007)
- Zombibi (2012)
- Zombie (2019)
- Zombie 108 (2012)
- Zombie Apocalypse (2011)
- Zombie Ass: Toilet of the Dead (2011)
- Zombie Bloodbath (1993)
- Zombie Brigade (1986)
- Zombie Chronicles (2001)
- The Zombie Diaries (2008)
- Zombie Dogs (2004)
- The Zombie Farm (2011)
- Zombie Fighters (2017)
- Zombie and the Ghost Train (1991)
- Zombie Girl: The Movie (2009)
- Zombie High (1987)
- Zombie Holidays 3D (2013)
- Zombie Holocaust (1979)
- Zombie Honeymoon (2004)
- Zombie Hunter (2013)
- Zombie Island Massacre (1984)
- Zombie Killers: Elephant's Graveyard (2015)
- The Zombie King (2013)
- Zombie King and the Legion of Doom (2004)
- Zombie Lake (1981)
- Zombie Massacre (2013)
- Zombie Movie (2005)
- Zombie Nation (2004)
- Zombie Night (2013)
- Zombie Night series:
  - Zombie Night (2003)
  - Zombie Night 2: Awakening (2006)
- Zombie Nightmare (1986)
- Zombie in a Penguin Suit (2011)
- Zombie Planet (2003)
- Zombie Prom (2006 short)
- Zombie Reddy (2021)
- Zombie Self-Defense Force (2006)
- Zombie Spring Breakers (2016)
- Zombie Strippers (2008)
- Zombie Undead (2010)
- Zombie Wars (2006)
- Zombie Women of Satan (2009)
- Zombie! vs. Mardi Gras (1999)
- Zombiegeddon (2003)
- Zombieland (2009)
- Zombieland: Double Tap (2019)
- Zombies (2016)
- Zombies series:
  - Zombies (2018 TV)
  - Zombies 2 (2020 TV)
  - Zombies 3 (2022)
  - Zombies 4: Dawn of the Vampires (2025)
- Zombies on Broadway (1945)
- Zombies of Mora Tau (1957)
- Zombies of the Stratosphere (1952)
- Zombies! Zombies! Zombies! (2008)
- Zombiesthaan (2019)
- Zombiez (2005)
- Zombillenium (2017)
- The Zombinator (2012)
- Zombitopia (2021)
- Zombivli (2022)

==== Zon–Zoz ====
- Zona J (1998)
- Zona pericolosa (1951)
- Zona Roja (1976)
- Zona Zamfirova (2002)
- Zonad (2009)
- The Zone: (2003 & 2011)
- Zone 414 (2021)
- Zone of the Dead (2009)
- The Zone of Death (1917)
- Zone Pro Site (2013)
- Zone Troopers (1985)
- Zontar, the Thing from Venus (1966 TV)
- Zoo: (2005, 2007 & 2017)
- Zoo in Budapest (1933)
- The Zoo Gang (1985)
- Zookeeper (2011)
- The Zookeeper (2001)
- The Zookeeper's Wife (2017)
- Zoolander (2001)
- Zoolander 2 (2016)
- Zoology (2016)
- Zooloo (2005)
- Zoom (2006, 2015, 2016 Kannada & 2016 Sinhala)
- Zoom and Bored (1957)
- Zoom In: Rape Apartments (1980)
- Zoom at the Top (1962)
- Zoom, Zoom, Superman! (1973)
- Zoombies (2016)
- Zoop in Africa (2005)
- Zoop in India (2006)
- Zoop in South America (2007)
- The Zoot Cat (1944)
- Zoot Suit (1981)
- Zootopia series:
  - Zootopia (2016)
  - Zootopia 2 (2025)
- Zor (1998)
- Zor Lagaa Ke...Haiya! (2009)
- Zora the Vampire (2000)
- Zoran, My Nephew the Idiot (2013)
- Zorawar (2016)
- Zorba the Greek (1964)
- Zorina (1949)
- Zorns Lemma (1970)
- Zorro: (1975 Italian & 1975 Hindi)
- Zorro in the Court of England (1969)
- Zorro Rides Again (1937)
- Zorro and the Three Musketeers (1963)
- Zorro's Black Whip (1944)
- Zorro's Fighting Legion (1939)
- Zorro, The Gay Blade (1981)
- Zotz! (1962)
- Zouzou (1934)
- Zoya (1944)
- The Zoya Factor (2019)
- Zozo (2005)

=== Zp–Zs ===
- Zpověď Dona Juana (1991)
- Zpověď zapomenutého (2015)
- Zpívající pudřenka (1959)
- Zsa Zsa Zaturnnah, ze Moveeh (2006)

=== Zu–Zz ===
- Zu Warriors from the Magic Mountain (1983)
- Zubaan (2016)
- Zubeidaa (2001)
- Zübük (1980)
- Zuckerkandl (1968)
- Züğürt Ağa (1985)
- Zugverkehr unregelmäßig (1951)
- Zula Hula (1937)
- Zulfiqar (2016)
- Zulm Ka Badla (1985)
- Zulm Ki Hukumat (1992)
- Zulm Ko Jala Doonga (1988)
- Zulm-O-Sitam (1998)
- Zulu (1964)
- Zulu (2013)
- Zulu Dawn (1979)
- Zulu Love Letter (2004)
- Zulu Wedding (2017)
- The Zulu's Heart (1908)
- Zum Teufel mit der Penne (1968)
- Zuma Beach (1978) (TV)
- Zur Hölle mit den Paukern (1968)
- Zur Sache, Macho! (2013)
- Zurdo (2003)
- El zurdo (1965)
- Zurich (2013)
- The Zurich Engagement (1957)
- Zus & Zo (2001)
- Zutto Mae Kara Suki Deshita (2016)
- Zuzu Angel (2006)
- Zvenigora (1928)
- Zvezda (2002)
- Zvony z rákosu (1950)
- Zwei himmlische Dickschädel (1974)
- Zwei Mütter (1957)
- Zwischen 2 Welten (1999)
- Zwischenfall in Benderath (1956)
- Zygon: When Being You Just Isn't Enough (2008)
- Zyzzyx Road (2006)
- Zzyzx (2006)

Previous: List of films: U–W

== See also ==
- Lists of films
- Lists of actors
- List of film and television directors
- List of documentary films
- List of film production companies
