= The Skies are Closer in Homesh =

- Directed by: Menora Hazani
- Release date: 2004
- Running time: 60 minutes
- Country: Israel
- Language: Hebrew with English subtitles

The Skies are Closer in Homesh (Hebrew: בחומש קרוב לשמיים), also called Hitna'ari (Hebrew: התנערי) is a 2004 documentary film that follows a newlywed Jewish couple through their first few years of married life in the Israeli settlement of Homesh in the West Bank as they experience, and recover from, a terrorist attack. It is based on the real-life experience of director Menora Hazani and her family who lived on the settlement.

Produced by Manora Hasani-Katzover, daughter of Benny Katzover, co-founder of ultranationalist activist group Gush Emunim, it has been described as "clearly an almost didactic, right-wing film".

== Description ==
The film is the second in a trilogy by Menora Hazani, a former resident of Homesh, presenting the point of view of Israeli settlers. She filmed the first of the trilogy, It Happened After the Spring (2001) before graduating from the Ma'aleh School of Television, Film and the Arts; The Skies are Closer in Homesh (2004) and Arise From the Dust (2005), recounting the evacuation of the settlement, followed. The Skies are Closer in Homesh documents the early years of Hazani's marriage and the birth of her first child at Homesh. Shortly after she moved to the isolated settlement, three residents were killed in terrorist attacks, and a month later, four members of the Gavish family were murdered. The film explores the plight of Israeli settlers in the West Bank and their yearning for the Messianic redemption.

The documentary sympathetically portrays the deep, Jewish attachment to the soil of the Holy Land. Filmed on two Israeli settlements that have experienced terrorist attacks, it also depicts the trauma experienced by Israeli settlers targeted by terrorists.

The film was screened at film festivals in New York and Washington, D.C.

== See also ==
Other documentaries about the Arab–Israeli conflict:

- The Land of the Settlers
- At the Green Line
- My Dearest Enemy
- All Hell Broke Loose
- Nadia's Friend
- The Temple Mount is Mine

== Sources ==
- "The Skies are Closer in Homesh". Jewish Film Archive Online.
