= On the Edge of Peace =

On The Edge of Peace
- Directed by: Ilan Ziv
- Release date: 1994
- Running time: 101 minutes
- Country: Israel
- Languages: Hebrew, Arabic, English

On the Edge of Peace is the first co-production film by Israeli and Palestinian filmmakers. The documentary involves a group of three Palestinians and three Israelis documenting their own lives through intimate video diaries. The video diaries span from the signing of the Oslo Accords to Yasser Arafat's return to Gaza in 1994.

== Summary ==
On The Edge of Peace shows the varied effects of politics on individuals' lives through the video diaries as well as through the media coverage of the political events that took place. The film also amplifies the perspectives of those in refugee camps, kibbutz settlements, and cities during the Israeli-Palestinian peace process.

== See also ==
Other Similar Israeli films:

- The Land of the Settlers
- My Dearest Enemy
- All Hell Broke Loose
- Reach for the Sky
- The Temple Mount is Mine
- The Skies are Closer in Homesh
