= Padrón (surname) =

Padrón is a surname of Galician origin. Its origin comes from the town of Padrón, in Galicia.

There are currently 4,729 people in Spain with the surname Padrón.

== List of persons with the surname ==
- Bernardo Padrón (contemporary), Venezuelan saxophonist and composer
- Diego Padrón (born 1939), Venezuelan Catholic cardinal
- Eduardo J. Padrón (contemporary), American academic and college president
- Frank Padrón (born 1958), Cuban film critic
- Humberto Padrón (born 1967), Cuban film director
- José Padrón (1906–1944), Spanish professional football player
- Juan Padrón (born 1947), Cuban premier animation director
- Julián Padrón (1910–1954), Venezuelan writer, journalist and lawyer
- Justo Jorge Padrón (1943–2021), Canarian Spanish poet
- Leo Padron, American watchmaker
- Justo Padron

(1964-Present), California Architect

== See also ==
- Padrón
