= Reach for the Sky (disambiguation) =

Reach for the Sky is a 1956 film starring Kenneth More as Douglas Bader.

Reach for the Sky may also refer to:

- Reach for the Sky (novel), a 1954 biography by Paul Brickhill about pilot Douglas Bader, the basis for the 1956 film
- Reach for the Sky (2001 film), a film about pilots in the Israeli army
- Reach for the Sky (The Allman Brothers Band album)
- Reach for the Sky (Ratt album)
- Reach for the Sky (Sutherland Brothers and Quiver album)
- Reach for the Sky, an album by Cowboy
- "Reach for the Sky" (FireHouse song)
- “Reach for the Sky”, a song by Gary Moore from his album Run for Cover
- "Reach for the Sky" (Mai Kuraki song)
- "Reach for the Sky", a song by Slaughter from the album The Wild Life
- "Reach for the Sky" (Social Distortion song)

== See also ==
- Reach the Sky, an American hardcore punk band
- Reach for the Skies (disambiguation)
