= The Temple Mount Is Mine =

The Temple Mount is Mine
- Directed by: Willy Lindwer
- Release date: 2003
- Running time: 52 min
- Language: English

The Temple Mount is Mine is a 2003 two-part documentary directed by Willy Lindwer that looks at why Muslims, Christians and Jews all lay claim to one of the holiest sites in the world.

== Summary ==
All three major Western religions trace the beginning of the world and the creation of the first man to the Dome of the Rock on the Temple Mount. On the same site that King David and King Solomon ruled, Jesus worshiped and Muhammad ascended into Heaven. The documentary captures the aesthetic beauty of the Holy Land as both religious leaders and average citizens explain the personal and historic importance of the Temple Mount.

Aerial shots of the city show the Dome of the Rock, hovering high above and glistening in the Middle Eastern sun. The camera also captures close-ups of the detailed mosaic exterior, which blends elements of Roman, Byzantine, Syrian, Hellenic, and Persian architectural elements, demonstrating the undeniable beauty of this Muslim house of prayer.

But the aesthetic beauty of the site contrasts with the animosity that has existed there for centuries. Through countless wars and battles, and many changes of hands, the Temple Mount's history contains mostly conflict.

The documentary explains how the Holy Land's long and turbulent history fuels the conflict over the Temple Mount. “We are not authorized to give up a heritage of our ancient fathers, who paid for thousands of years with self sacrifice,” a rabbi explains. The territorial argument extends as far back as the religions’ formations. “The Bible is our document, our right to this place,” a Jewish man insists. Muslims interviewed in the film differ.

== See also ==
Other documentary films about Israel:

- The Land of the Settlers
- At the Green Line
- The Skies are Closer in Homesh
- All Hell Broke Loose
- Beyond Mountains of Darkness
- My Dearest Enemy
