= Nadia's Friends =

- Chanoch Ze'evi
- Directed by: Chanoch Ze'evi
- Release date: 2006
- Running time: 60 minutes
- Country: Israel
- Language: Hebrew

Nadia's Friends is a 2006 Israeli documentary film which follows filmmaker Chanoch Zeevi as he travels through Israel exploring how Zionism has evolved since he was a child. Zeevi attended elementary school in the religious Zionist village of Kfar Haroeh, where his classmates represented a cross-section of Israeli society. They included Jews of every background: Ashkenazi, Sephardi, religious, secular, and even one Arab girl —Nadia, for whom the film is named. Now, more than twenty-five years after graduating from elementary school, Zeevi has organized a class reunion that brings together men and women whose lives have diverged from the original journey begun in Kfar Haroeh.

== Summary ==
Religious Zionism has become an intolerant, polarizing, radical element of Israeli society, and that change threatens to tear Israel apart from the inside, declares filmmaker Chanoch Zeevi. In Nadia's Friends, Zeevi uses the profoundly subjective lens that he and his grade school classmates offer to examine this phenomenon and its impact on the Jewish State.

“We felt that we were a part of religious Zionism’s elite unit that was destined to produce an open and religious ideal youth,” says Zeevi of his childhood years spent in the religious Zionist infrastructure. The dream was to build “a model of an ideal Jewish society of soil-tilling religious Jews who would integrate in the general Zionist society and be a bridge between the religious and the secular.”

For Zeevi, the experience of his childhood represents the ideal of religious Zionism, an inclusive movement that sought to unify the Jewish people and the Israeli public — to be the bridge between people on different sides of the ideological, political and ethnic divides. Where his own generation was taught to “walk between the drops and to beware of political radicalism,” today's religious Zionists are increasingly embracing political radicalism, he asserts. The result, says Zeevi, is that “the encounters that were so natural back then” — encounters between the religious and the secular, the Jew and the Arab — “no longer happen.”

But the viewer discovers that, in his nostalgia, Zeevi romanticizes the Israeli melting pot. The same culture of tolerance that he lauds also sought to eliminate non-Western influences and impose Ashkenazi culture and practice on Jews and Arabs of the East. Indeed, Zeevi was blissfully unaware of the difficulties faced by some of his classmates, Jews of Sephardic descent, as they tried to acclimate and adapt themselves to their new, Ashkenazi surroundings.

Nor are Zeevi's former classmates the unified religious Zionists Zeevi might have expected them to become. Indeed, they span the entire gamut of political, ideological and religious affiliations in contemporary Israel. Sarah'le is the daughter of the first victim of the Palestinian Intifada, and is herself a well-known settler activist. She declines Zeevi's invitation because, she says, she doesn't want to be the radical in the group. Another former classmate is now an ultra-Orthodox, anti-Zionist husband and father of five who resides in an insular community where contact with outsiders is extremely limited. Sophie, a divorcee and mother of two, is dating a Thai immigrant and says that she is not particularly concerned about issues of Jewish identity.

Thus, the very values that Zeevi idealizes as shaping the religious Zionist movement of his childhood are being rejected, in one form or another, by his own former classmates.

Nadia's Friends offers little in the way of answers or resolutions to the issue of conflict within Israeli society, but it does present an attempt at dialogue between the competing voices of the Israeli public. In the process, the film raises interesting and important questions about the state of the Jews in the Jewish State, and the viewer learns, together with Zeevi, that these questions don't always have pat, easy answers.

== Reception ==
Nadia's Friends received an honorable mention at the Jerusalem Film Festival.

== See also ==
Other Documentary films about Israel:

- The Land of the Settlers
- At the Green Line
- Reach for the Sky
- Yitzhak Rabin (film)
