= Lullaby (2005 film) =

- Directed by: Adi Arbel
- Produced by: Naama Pyritz
- Release date: 2005
- Running time: 52 minutes
- Country: Israel
- Languages: Hebrew; Arabic

Lullaby is a documentary film by Adi Arbel that interviews both Palestinian and Israeli mothers whose children have been killed as a result of the Palestinian-Israeli conflict.

== Summary ==
Over 150 Israeli and Palestinian children have been killed since the start of the Second Intifada in 2000. Lullaby tells the story of those grieving mothers in their own words.

“My daughter was born on the day the Intifada set off. When she turned 6 months old an Israeli baby was shot in the head; a month later a Palestinian baby was shot. This for me was intolerable,” says filmmaker Adi Arbel of her inspiration for making the film.

In the film, eleven women describe their children's deaths in this horrible conflict. Their own struggles to cope with their personal tragedies show candor, emotion, and at times even a sense of humor. Transmitted throughout the film are penetrating revelations about motherhood, the gruesomeness of armed conflict, and the burden of bearing witness in the most tragic way possible.

These eleven women come from varied backgrounds: Palestinians, Israelis, a Russian immigrant, and an American Christian living in Israel. The stories of their children's deaths are chilling, sometimes shared in explicit detail, and through these stories the viewer comes to understand a common thread among them.

For some of the mothers, their tragedy is seeing their child brutally killed before their eyes; for others, their tragedy is not having been there to witness their child's last moments. A baby-faced Palestinian mother is as traumatized by having found her infant daughter's body ripped open by IDF gunfire as an older Israeli grandmother is by not knowing what happened to her daughter and two of her four grandchildren in their last moments. “The neighbor told me she screamed ‘Mommy’ as hard as she could,” cries the grandmother in the film, “and I’m just trying to imagine, to put pieces together to know what happened to my daughter in that moment…and I can’t solve this mystery.”

Their children's deaths serve for all the mothers as a challenge to their motherhood, as they find themselves tortured by their inability to do what they feel is a mother's primary responsibility: to protect her children. “She is so small and helpless and you are everything for her because without you she couldn’t live…and all of a sudden, in this attack, you are there for her, but you can’t do anything. Nothing,” relates a secular Israeli. “Forgive me son, I could not help you when you called out to me, I was under debris,” a Palestinian mother recalls pleading to her son as she held him for the last time.

But overwhelmingly, the greatest pain these mothers share is in missing the presence of their children. They all have that same wonder of what sort of adults their children would have become, and describe being haunted by their memories of their children.

Finally, they share the necessary struggle of moving on, and of being complete parents to their remaining children. As the young Palestinian mother asks, “Tomorrow, when my children grow up, how are they to see me like this? I am supposed to instill courage in them. They shouldn’t be scared of anything. But I myself am scared, I am terrorized.”

== See also ==
Other documentaries about the Israeli-Palestinian conflict:

- The Land of the Settlers
- At the Green Line
