= Karel Hruška =

Czech opera singer

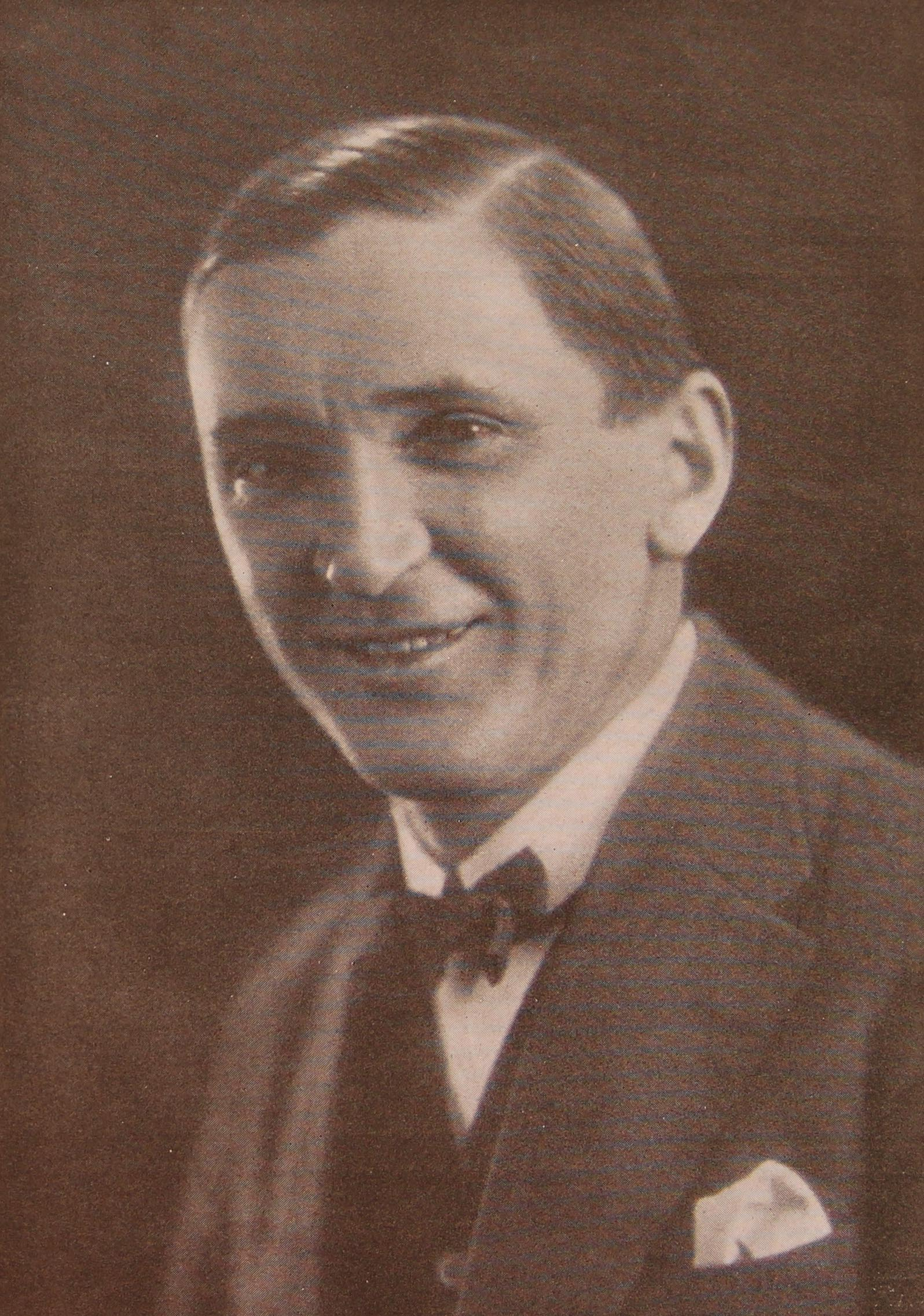
Karel Hruška

Karel Hruška (14 June 1891 – 17 October 1966) was a Czech tenor, radio personality, and actor of the stage and film. He was an unusual singer for his day in that he recorded and performed both classical and popular music. Possessing a great comic talent, he specialized in creating character parts on the opera stage. He was a much loved Principál komediantů in Bedřich Smetana's The Bartered Bride, notably portraying the role a total of 855 times during his career.

== Biography ==
Born in Plzeň, Hruška studied singing with Josef Branzovský before making his professional opera debut as Beppe in Ruggero Leoncavallo's Pagliacci at the J. K. Tyl Theatre in Plzeň in 1911. He was committed to that opera house for the next eight years. In 1919 he joined the roster of singers at the National Theatre in Prague where he portrayed mainly comprimario roles for many years. He notably created the role of the Executioner in the world premiere of Jaromír Weinberger's Schwanda the Bagpiper on 27 April 1927.

Between 1928 and 1943 Hruška made several gramophone record recordings of popular music, including a number of recordings with Vlasta Burian. He also had his own program on Czech Radio and sang on a number of complete opera recordings made on the Supraphon label.

Hruška made his first movie appearance in the 1913 Czech feature film Prodaná nevěsta. He appeared in seven more Czech feature films during his career: Červená karkulka (1922), Josef Kajetán Tyl (1926), Podskalák (1929), Třetí zvonění (1938), Zvony z rákosu (1951), Anna proletářka (1953), and Dobrodružství na Zlaté zátoce (1955).
