= San'ya =

Area in Tokyo, Japan

San'ya 山谷
- Area
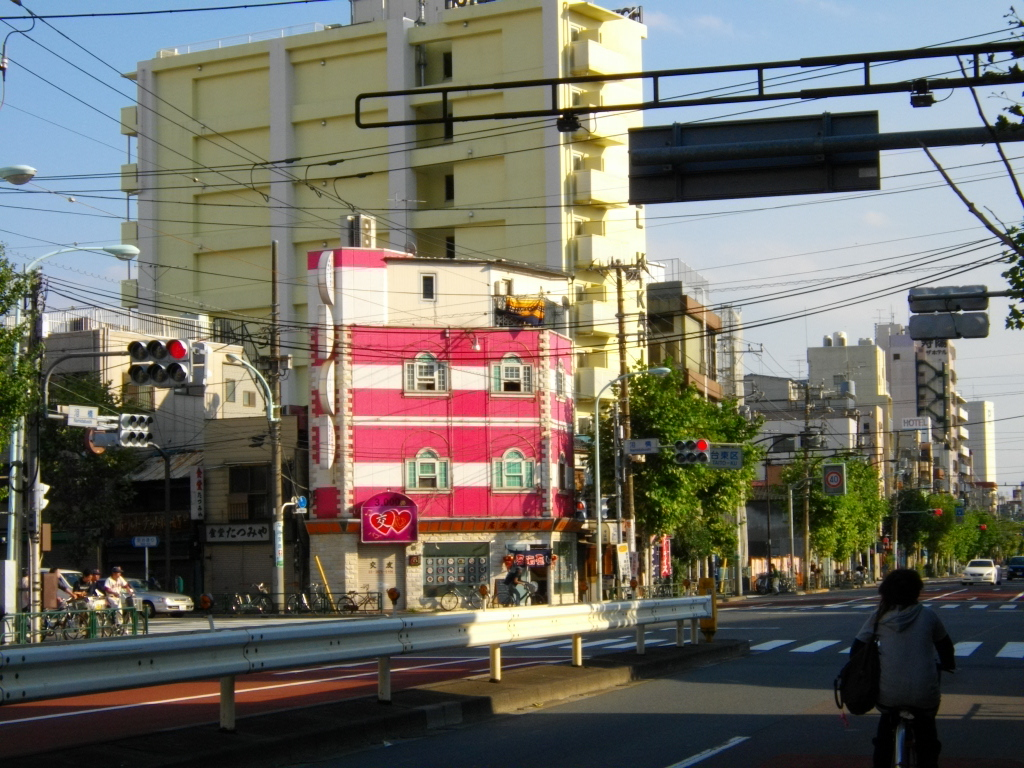
- Namidabashi Intersection

- Location in Japan Location within Tokyo
- Coordinates: 35°43′44″N 139°47′58″E (Namidabashi Intersection)
- Country: Japan
- Time zone: UTC+09:00 (JST)

San'ya (山谷, San'ya) is an area in the Taitō and Arakawa wards of Tokyo, located south of the Namidabashi intersection, around the Yoshino-dori. A neighborhood named "San'ya" existed until 1966, but the area was renamed and split between several neighborhoods.

It is a region with a distinct culture, an area of crowded, cheap rooming houses where day laborers and jōhatsu live.

San'ya dates to the Edo period. Lower caste workers, butchers, tanners, leatherworkers, and the like, were forced to live in this undesirable region by the predominantly Buddhist authorities. It has retained its association with both lower class workers and with craftsmen. Within the past few years gentrification has begun to encroach on the area.

In recent years, some of the rooming houses have converted to provide cheap accommodation for foreign backpackers.

== Summary ==
Namidabashi (on the borderline of current day Taito-Ward and Arakawa-Ward) is on the boundary of former Edo. In the vicinity there were areas such as an execution site and a temple where the corpses of prostitutes were thrown; in the southwestern part of Sanya, there is still a soapland district formerly known as Yoshiwara (this name also faded away due to the government's address renaming programming in 1966. The area is now known as Taito-Ward, Senzoku – 1 Bureau).

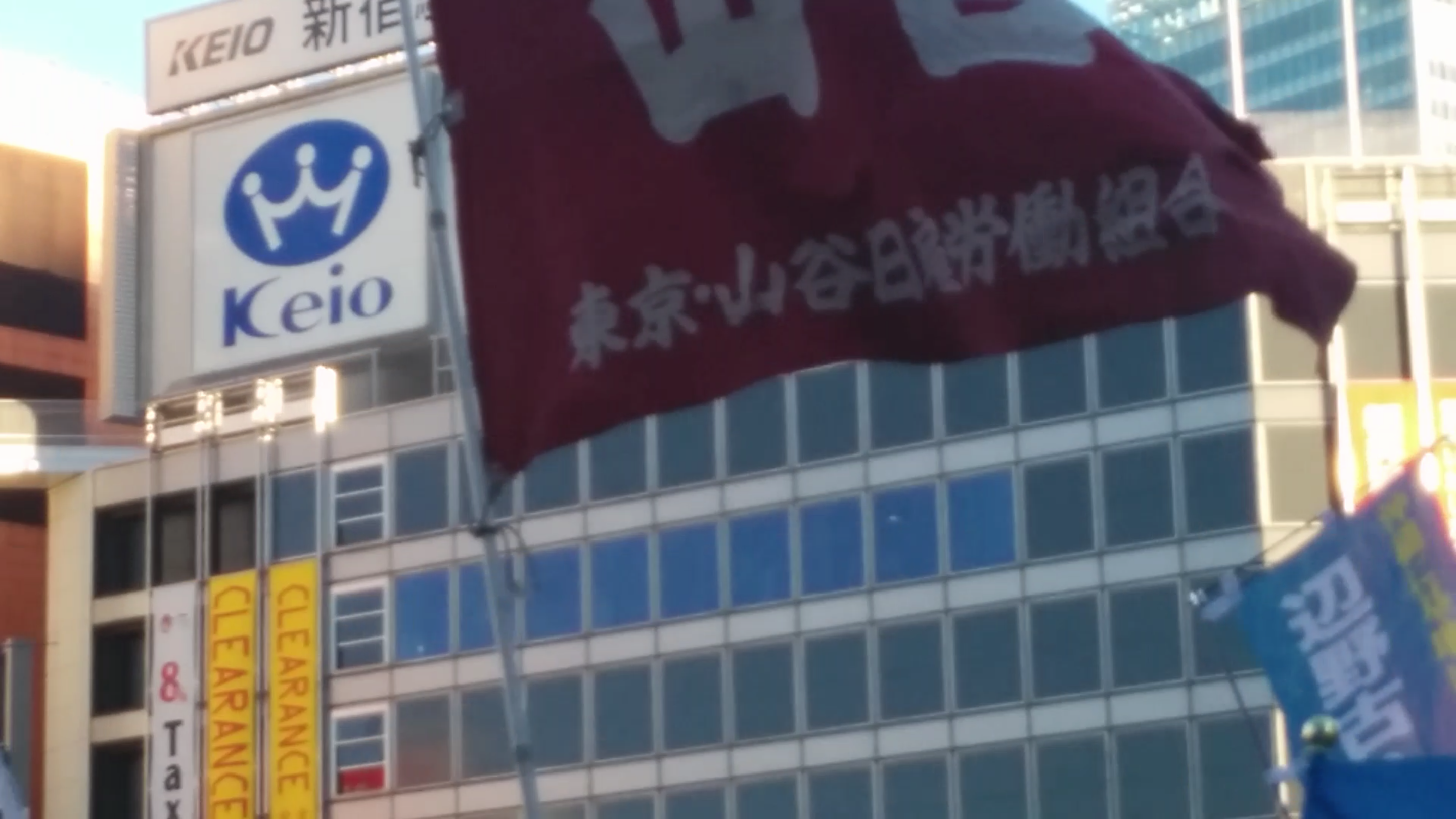
Flag of a San'ya day laborers organization at a protest in Shinjuku

The working conditions of the day laborers of Sanya are substandard, and many fall prey to the yakuza crime syndicate. In reaction, anti-war and anti-emperor system billboards and signs can also be seen in the district. Catholic and Protestant churches and other organizations took root in Sanya, and in cooperation, provide emergency food and other humanitarian services.

=== Simple-lodging establishments ===
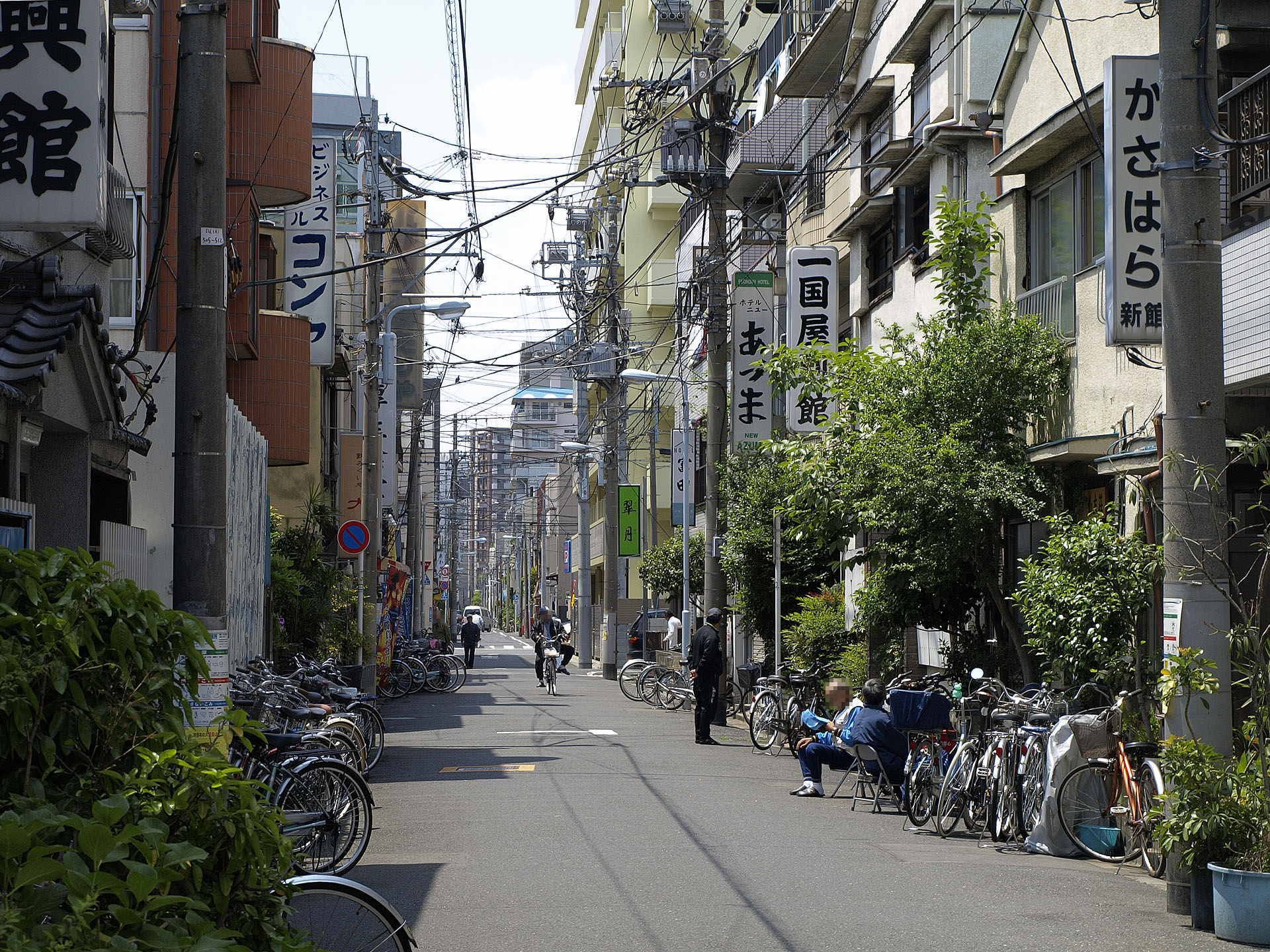
Budget hotels in San'ya district

Since the Edo period, Kichinyado (木賃宿, a type of cheap lodging house that does not serve meals) have been located along the sides of the Ōshū Kaidō and the Nikkō Kaidō routes (two of the five main Edo period routes). To this day, there are many of these simple lodging establishments in areas where day laborers assemble. Throughout Japan, these lodging establishments are called “doya"(ja:ドヤ街). Prior to 1966, the address of this area was Taito-Ward, Asakusa, Sanya 1~4 Chome, but due to a government program enforcing the renaming of displayed address across Japan, the name “Sanya” faded away.

Presently, in Tokyo, the area designated “The Sanya District” is in the heart of the Namidabashi (Bridge of Tears) intersection. The simple-lodging establishments are concentrated in the below areas:

- Taito-Ward, Kiyokawa 1-2 Chome
- Taito-Ward, Nihonzutsumi 1-2 Chome
- Taito-Ward, Asakusa 2 Chome
- Taito-Ward, Hashiba 1-2 Chome
- Arakawa-Ward, Minamisenjuu 2 Chome, West 2 Chome, 5 Chome, West 7 Chome

Most of the simple-lodging establishments provide only a place where one can sleep (things such as food services are not provided). Inside, the lodging facilities can vary; dormitory style rooms for eight people are even offered. Also, on the front of many of these lodgings, signs with promotional phrases such as “Color TV in Every Room,” “Air Conditioned and Heated Rooms” are hung. Although this trivial formality may vary lodging to lodging, with the exception of newly constructed simple-lodging establishments, these two phrases are almost always present.

Since the 2002 FIFA World Cup, foreign tourists have started using cheap lodging in Sanya (mainly in Senjuu). Foreign customers are increasing due to inexpensive prices, public order good transport links. The nearest station, the Minami Senju Subway Station, via the Hibiya Line, links the stations Ueno, Akihabara, Ginza, Roppongi and others.

On October 3, 2008, after the arson incident on the Minami adult video store in Osaka, the prefectural governor of Tokyo, Ishihara Shintaro, made the following comment concerning lodging establishments in Sanya and the people displaced from the fire, “If you go to Sanya, there are plenty of places you can stay for 200 or 300 yen, but in fashion, while you stay over at a 1500 yen a night place, you say things like, “This is dreadful.”” In regards to this statement, the Chief of Taito-Ward protested, which led to Ishihara, in an interview on October 10, 2008 to correct his previous statement by saying “The numbers were a little off.” As of 2008, places where you can stay for 200 or 300 yen do not exist.

== History ==
Originally, the area was the first inn town in the direction of Edo on the Nikkoukaidou Highway. From the early days of the Meiji Era, it was the government's intention to form the cheap housing district in the outskirts of the city near the highway in order to have a place for rickshaw workers who shuttled customers to and from the Yoshiwara Red Light District to live. By the pre-war days, there was already a largely poor class, such as day laborers, residing in the area. After the war, temporary lodging (tent village) were prepared for the war victims, however these were changed into the permanent simple-lodging establishments that are seen today. Before long, the period of rapid economic growth experienced in Japan after World War II arrived, and in order to cope with the upsurge in the demand for workers, Japan's more prominent location for temporary workers, Sanya, was developed. By 1961, the 300 simple-lodging establishments had been built in Sanya were housing approximately 20,000 workers.

During the 1960s, due to the many riots with participants numbering in the thousands, this area had to establish the Sanya District Police Station (once popularly called "Mammoth Station", is now currently renamed to Nihon-Tsutsumi Police Station). Many reasons have surfaced regarding the direct origin of the riots, with some theories pointing at the escalation of conflict between yakuza groups and organized day laborers.

In 1969, the folk singer Okabayashi released "Sanya Blues", a song about the grief of day laborers. It is said that Okabayashi manufactured the image of his lengthy stint in Sanya, when in fact his stay was to the extent of one week.

In the year 1984 and 1988, two journalists and activists producing the documentary Yama – Attack to Attack were successively assassinated. The film depicts the conflicts between day laborers and the secret maneuvering of the Yakuza. The murder suspects are members of the "Kokusuikai" yakuza group.

In 1996, Tokyo and the 23 Wards of Tokyo mutually agreed to carry out a deed that gave protection to homeless people. Until each ward decided on a residence for their homeless population, they entrusted their homeless residents to Sanya. The measure was to temporarily give custody, but problems such as who was the guarantor of the homeless existed. After that once more the wards could not find that many apartments to take over for their homeless, so more homeless were taken to Sanya, and just like that, left alone. Over a long period of time, many people were left with an uncertain address. Because of these events, Sanya is derogatorily referred to as the "district of abandoned people". In recent years, the aging of Sanya's principal residents, the day laborers, and the decreasing population have become problems. From this fact, it is said that "the town of day laborers" is in the process of becoming "the town of welfare".

Accompanying such a change in residents, the simple-lodging establishments that existed traditionally for day laborers, are instead, increasingly being used as cheap hotels, due to foreigners from many countries coming to Japan for travel. Inside of the lodgings, information has come to be written in English, and the movement of owners promoting to foreign customers can be seen. Also brand new constructions of simple-lodging establishments are appearing one by one. Furthermore, in recent years, the case can be seen where during breaks, young people from inside and outside of Japan traveling to the city or coming for events use these simple-lodging establishments.

== Transportation ==
Minami Senju Station

- Jouban Line, Hibiya Line, Tsukuba Express: 7-minute walk to Sanya

Minowa Station

- Hibiya Line: 10-minute walk to Sanya

== "Sanya" written around Tokyo ==
After the government act to change the name of Sanya and several other locations in Tokyo in the 1960s, the name Sanya has been fading away. Outside of the name's usage in outdated maps, below are some of the few locations in Tokyo where the written word "Sanya" can still be seen:

- Chuo-Ward – "Sanya River Bank" is located in the present day town of Nihonbashi. Also, there is the "Sanya Canal" which can be passed while going the Yoshiwara Red Light District from the "Sanya Boat", a shipping agency.
- Shibuya-Ward – In the current Yoyogi district, there is a "Sanya Elementary School".
