= Frutas en el café =

2005 film

- Directed by: Humberto Padrón
- Release date: 2005

Frutas en el café is a film directed by Humberto Padrón. The film won several awards in Cuban film festivals.

Frutas en el café tells the story of several characters: Faría, an audacious prostitute who has less than 24 hours to settle a debt or endanger her livelihood. Avelino is an honest and radical Communist who denounces his wife's illicit business undertakings to the police. Miro is a young painter who can't sell her artwork at the fair but manages to obtain the financial support of a foreigner in exchange for her company. These three stories of sexual corruption become intertwined when a mysterious painting crosses their paths.

== Awards ==
- Special Mention from the Jury . Festival Cinepobre 2005, Cuba
