= Video de familia =

2001 film

- Directed by: Humberto Padrón
- Written by: Humberto Padrón
- Produced by: Mayte Rey
- Starring: Enrique Molina; Veronica Lynn
- Music by: Carlos Varela
- Distributed by: ICAIC(Cuba)
- Release date: February 2001 (Cuba)
- Running time: 47 minutes
- Country: Cuba
- Language: Spanish

Video de familia is an independent Cuban film made in 2001. It tells the story of a broken Cuban family with a homosexual son which has emigrated to the US. The film is composed of 5 shots of 10 minutes each, in the form of Video Letters. The film has won a number of awards in Cuba.

== Mise en Scene ==
Shot with a VHS camcorder in 5 long un-interrupted hand-held takes, the film consists of several video letters a Cuban family records for their emigrated relative.

== Awards ==
- Grand Prize for fictional work, 14° Encuentro Nacional de Video, La Habana, Cuba.
- FIPRESCI award, Festival Cineplaza 2001, La Habana, Cuba.
- Best Screenplay Festival Cineplaza 2001, La Habana, Cuba.
- Best Director, Festival Cineplaza 2001, La Habana, Cuba.
- Best Film, Festival Cineplaza 2001, La Habana, Cuba.
- Best Actor, Festival Cineplaza 2001, La Habana, Cuba.
- Best Actress, Festival Cineplaza 2001, La Habana, Cuba.
- Best Director, Festival Caracol de la UNEAC. La Habana Cuba
- Grand Prize, Festival IMAGO, La Habana, Cuba
- Coral for Berst Short Film corto de ficción, 23rd Festival Internacional del Nuevo Cine Latinoamericano.
- Mégano Award from the National Federation of Cine Clubs at the 23rd Festival Internacional del Nuevo Cine Latinoamericano.
- Special Awards from OCIC en el 23rd Festival Internacional del Nuevo Cine Latinoamericano.
