= Rod Duncan =

British writer

- Born: 1962 (age 63–64); Wales
- Occupations: Author; Lecturer at De Montfort University
- Notable work: The Riot Trilogy; The Fall of the Gas-Lit Empire series

Rod Duncan (born 1962, Wales) is a British writer. He grew up in Aberystwyth. He was identified as dyslexic at the age of eight and made his way through the education system by avoiding writing as much as possible. Duncan went on to study Mining Geology in the University of Leicester, for which he attained a BSc (Hons). He returned to Leicester to study Geology and Satellite Imagery for a PhD, but did not complete this. Duncan moved to Taiwan in 1989, where he established an environmental education development programme on behalf of the Baháʼí Faith community. He returned to Leicestershire in 1993, where he lives in Glenfield working as an author and lecturer at De Montfort University.

Being dyslexic, it was the invention of the word processor that enabled him to develop his storytelling and writing skills. He now uses dictation software as a tool in the writing process.

== Writings ==
His first published novels form the so-called "Riot Trilogy", each of which examine the same riot, on one day in Leicester, from the experience of a different character. Backlash was shortlisted for the Crime Writers' Association CWA New Blood Dagger award for the best debut crime novel of 2003.

The books in this series are:

- Backlash
- Breakbeat
- Burnout

As part of the Crime Express series, Duncan wrote the short story "The Mentalist".

Duncan has since moved into writing steampunk novels. His first trilogy was The Fall of the Gas-Lit Empire, the first book of which, The Bullet-Catcher's Daughter, was nominated for the Philip K. Dick Award for 2014. Set in the "Gas-Lit Empire", a Victorianesque version of Leicester and Lincolnshire, the events happen in the aftermath of a Luddite revolution that has reined back technology. The novel takes place at a travelling magic show and is themed around illusion, hence the bullet catch trick in the title.

The books in this trilogy are:

- The Bullet-Catcher's Daughter
- Unseemly Science
- The Custodian of Marvels

A further trilogy, The Map of Unknown Things, features the same protagonist, Elizabeth Barnabus:

- The Queen of All Crows
- The Outlaw & the Upstart King
- The Fugitive and the Vanishing Man

Rod Duncan wrote and performed in a Rhys Davies film, "How to Make a Movie for £43". He also performed in Zombie Undead, also by Rhys Davies.
