= Yitzhak Rabin: A Biography =

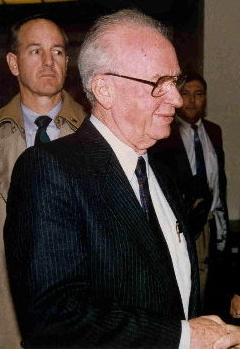
- Directed by: Ben Shani
- Country of origin: Israel
- Original language: Hebrew with English subtitles

Production
- Running time: 100 min.

Original release
- Release: 2004

Yitzhak Rabin: A Biography is a 2004 two-part documentary film that tells the life story of the former Israeli Prime Minister and Nobel Laureate, Yitzhak Rabin. The documentary features interviews with Rabin's fellow politicians and family members. Their insights along with historic film footage offer a history of modern Israel through Rabin's biography. Part I of Rabin describes Rabin's childhood in Israel, his military service that began at sixteen, and the roots of his rivalry with Shimon Peres. Part II follows the politician from a lull in his career, to the height of his popularity, ending with his assassination.

== Summary ==
Rabin's dedication to his homeland and the Jewish people was consistent. But while his early life was spent conquering territory and establishing Israel as a strong and independent nation with military force, he spent the last years of his life negotiating for peace and asking the settlers to abandon their homes.

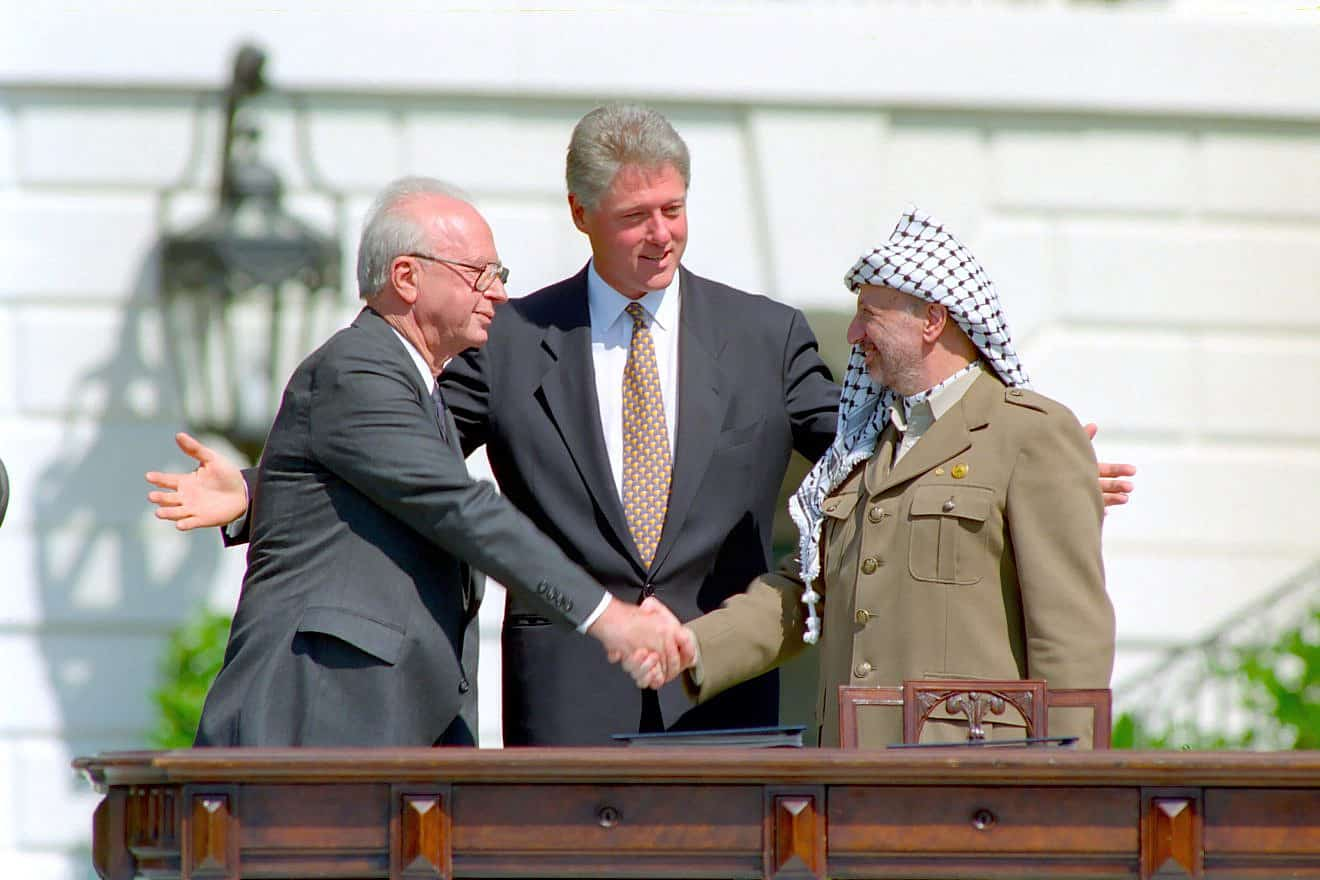
Yitzhak Rabin, Bill Clinton, and Yasser Arafat during the Oslo Accords on September 13, 1993

The documentary offers a rounded perspective of Rabin by touching briefly on his personal life. Family interviews reveal a side of Rabin that the public would otherwise be unaware of. It was at a young age that Rabin married his wife Leah, who jokes that she had, "the sense to see potential in such a shy man."

A recurring theme in Rabin's life seems to be how his anti-war instincts bring him criticism for being "hesitant" and "weak." Having experienced the horrors of battle, he was never eager to engage Israel in war. Just before the Six-Day War, his biographer says that Rabin was smoking 120 cigarettes a day and getting little sleep, worried by looming hostility. Rabin's critics read his anxiety as a sign that he was a feeble, unfit leader, while his admirers saw it as proof that he understood the gravity of the matters at hand.

When Rabin's wife, Leah, was put under trial for having an illegal American bank account (an incident which became known as the Dollar Account affair), he felt forced to resign as Prime Minister. Out of office, he published his memoirs, which were highly critical of Peres and other Leftists. He had hoped his book would boost his popularity, but it had the opposite effect. His shyness, which made him seem cold and aloof, only made matters worse. Rabin was convinced that his days of political prestige were behind him. But, thanks to his wife's unwavering support and his own determination, Rabin worked back up the political ranks to find himself again as Israel's Prime Minister.

When all seemed lost, Leah would say, "Don't worry, He'll be Prime Minister again." Annoyed and disheartened, Rabin would respond, "Woman, stop talking nonsense." He had lost hope, but she never did. Close family friends confide that there's no doubt that Lea played a crucial role in Rabin's political success because of charisma with the media and her unwavering support of her husband. As time passed his public image changed, and Rabin was seen as a warrior who was prepared to compromise for peace but wouldn't compromise Israel's autonomy and strength.

Part II of Rabin paints a picture of a leader who never shied away from the violence but worked diligently to promote peace, despite the criticism he received for it. When suicide bombers broke out in Israel, in response to the peace talks between Arafat and Rabin, Rabin insisted on being at the scene immediately to witness the horrors first hand. He was not afraid to confront violence, but wanted a future for Israel that didn't revolve around bloodshed. Just before his death, his secret peace negotiations with Jordan's King Hussein were announced to the public and his plan for peace with Yasser Arafat was about to be enacted.

After a lifetime dedicated to fighting for Israel, it's the ultimate offense that, at the end of a peace rally, an Israeli took his life. The documentary points to the haunting foreshadowing to Rabin's assassination, which he ignored. He refused to wear a bulletproof vest, explaining to his political advisors that after surviving war he should feel safe walking with civilians in the streets. At his funeral, politicians from around the globe mourned Rabin. King Hussein called a "colleague and friend" and United States President Bill Clinton said he was "in awe of" and "loved."

== Quotes ==
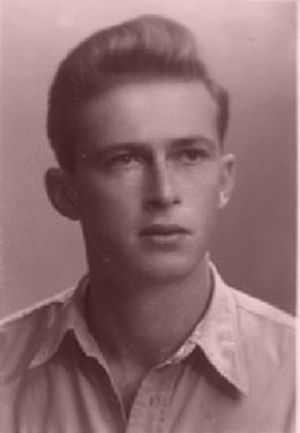
Rabin shortly before joining the Palmach

Rabin's quotes from the film:

- "You make peace with your enemies—not the Queen of Holland." (of peace negotiations with Arafat)
- "Today we are embarking on a battle which has no dead and no wounded. No blood and no anguish. This is the only battle which is a pleasure to wage. The battle for peace." (addressing the United States Congress)

== See also ==
- List of Nobel Peace Prize Laureates
- List of Israel's Chiefs of the General Staff
- Politics of Israel

Other documentaries about Israeli politics:

- At the Green Line
- The Land of the Settlers
