= Reach for the Skies =

Reach for the Skies may refer to:

- Reach for the Skies (video game), a 1993 combat flight simulator
- Reach for the Skies (TV series), a 2018 drama series

== See also ==
- Reach for the Sky (disambiguation)
