= All Hell Broke Loose =

- Directed by: Amir Feldman
- Written by: Amir Feldman
- Release date: 1995
- Running time: 45 minutes
- Country: Israel
- Languages: Hebrew (Arabic and English subtitles)

All Hell Broke Loose is a 1995 Israeli documentary that follows the victims of a Hamas suicide bombing in Israel a year after the attack.

== Summary ==
The documentary shares interviews with victims of a 1994 Hamas suicide-bomb that detonated at a bus station in Afula just as a group of students were boarding. The film looks at the cycle of prejudice and violence that feeds on itself and perpetuates the conflict between Jews and Arabs.

After the massacre, Israelis rioted and chanted, “death to the Arabs.” Some family members, outraged by the terror their loved one had faced, chanted along. But others realized that Arabs had been injured too, and a rare few worked even harder to promote understanding and peace between the divided people.

The film shares the devastating effects of having survived a terrorist attack. One little boy who survived the attack now has burn scars all over his back and arms; he was robbed of his naiveté and now stared at his playmates like a skeptical old man. He says he thinks about death now, which is something he'd never thought about before.

Despite the documentary's grim subject matter, it does leave room to hope for the future. The film profiles two young people who are working to end the pattern of violence. A young Israeli girl and her Palestinian friend are leaders in a movement that brings Arabs and Jews together to live and socialize, in an effort to prove that the two groups can exist peacefully. When three Arabs move onto a house with three Jews on a Kibbutz their lives are challenging, but the idealists are willing to suffer through slanderous attacks in order to help move their nation in the direction they want to see it go.

== See also ==
Other Israeli Documentaries about the Israeli-Palestinian conflict:

- The Land of the Settlers
- My Dearest Enemy
- The Temple Mount is Mine
- At the Green Line
