= Bernardo Padrón =

Bernardo Padrón is a saxophonist-composer who was born in Caracas, Venezuela. From the age of 5 until the age of 27 he lived in Canada, growing up in Ottawa, and studying in Toronto. He then returned to Venezuela, and lived in Caracas for the following 12 years. Now, since October 2003, although maintaining an active working base in Caracas, Bernardo has made Toronto, Ontario once again, his home.

After graduating from the University of Toronto's Faculty of Music Performance program in 1986, Bernardo played tenor and alto sax in the Toronto Latin musical community, as well as recording with various local jazz projects (Don Valley Parkway, Mosaic) as a sideman.

In the spring of 1991, Bernardo travelled to Habana, Cuba to study Cuban percussion and arranging until February 1992. Upon arriving in Caracas in 1992, he was quickly integrated into the jazz scene, and began playing with Venezuela's top jazz artists (Biela DaCosta, El Gallo Velasquez, Jesús 'Chucho' Sanoja, and Martes 8:30, among others). During this time, Bernardo participated as tenor saxophonist on the following recordings: Biela DaCosta's 'Jazz and Blues' (1994), Andy Duran's 'Timeless' Vol.1 (1996), Ramón Carranza's 'Carranza Jazz' (1996), Martes 8:30's 'Ayer y Hoy' (1998), Gerardo Chacon's 'Espacial' (2000), and Frank Quintero's 'Celebración' (2003).

In the commercial-pop genre, Bernardo has toured with Venezuela's internationally acclaimed artists: Kiara (singer), Luz Marina (as musical director) and Frank Quintero.

From 1998 until early 2003, Bernardo divided his professional time equally in the areas of music production (for documentaries and television commercials), teaching and performing with his jazz group, with which he recorded his first Compact Disc as leader, composer, and producer: 'SEADANCE', released in 2001 and distributed internationally by Latin World Entertainment.

Presently, Bernardo is concentrating on reintegrating himself into the Canadian jazz scene, and preparing for his next CD.

== Discography ==
- Seadance (2001)
