= Zooloo =

- Directed by: Nicolas Bazz
- Written by: Nicolas Bazz
- Produced by: Ann Barrel; Nicolas Bazz
- Starring: Pierre-Alain de Garrigues; Jean-Claude Dreyfus; Élise Larnicol; Pierre-François Martin-Laval; Pierre Richard; François Rollin
- Cinematography: Vincent Jeannot
- Music by: Christophe Jacquelin
- Production company: Ombres Production
- Release date: October 27, 2005
- Running time: 18 minutes
- Country: France
- Language: French

Zooloo is a 2005 short film directed by Nicolas Bazz.

== Plot ==
Between digital pirates and high sea pirates there are the Zooloos.

On the mic of their cult radio show, Rob and Nemo get the scoop... No matter what.

Tonight, as they're going after the Mayor of Paris, they 're about to fall in an ambush set up by Chief Inspector Hans (Pierre Richard) and his second in command.

== Cast ==
Rob : Pierre-Alain de Garrigues

Juan : Jean-Claude Dreyfus

Mayor's Neighbour : Élise Larnicol

Doc Galaxy : Pierre-François Martin-Laval

Chief inspector Hans : Pierre Richard

The Mayor of Paris : François Rollin

Cop : Antoine Réjasse

Nemo : Steve Suissa

Cop : Frédéric Volovitch

== Production credits ==
Directed by: Nicolas Bazz

Written by: Nicolas Bazz

Produced by: Ann Barrel and Nicolas Bazz

Music by: Christophe Jacquelin

Cinematography: Vincent Jeannot
