= Zielen van Napels =

- Directed by: Vincent Monnikendam
- Produced by: Sherman De Jesus; Cécile van Ejik
- Cinematography: Melle van Essen
- Edited by: Albert Markus
- Distributed by: 1More Film
- Release date: August 18, 2005
- Country: Netherlands
- Language: Italian

Zielen van Napels is a documentary film by director Vincent Monnikendam that was first released in the United States in a special preview at the National Gallery of Art in Washington, D.C. in 2005.

The film covers the many aspects of the diverse and socially terraced Neapolitan society and is filmed primarily in local dialects and Italian. English subtitles were available during the opening preview at the NGA.

This documentary has frequented a number of the more renowned film festivals, including the International Film Festival Rotterdam and the 2004 Toronto International Film Festival.
