= Frank Padrón =

Cuban film critic

Frank Padrón Nodarse (born 1958) is a Cuban film critic based in Havana and also host of the popular TV show De Nuestra América, in which he reviews movies for his Cuban audience. He has been a leading film critic in the country for over a quarter of a century.

== Publications ==
- Poetry:
- La profesión maldita, Santiago de Cuba. Editorial Oriente, 2004
- Las celadas de Narciso
- Más allá de la linterna
- "Prologue" to Con pies de gato, Miguel Barnet
- Miocardio culpable
