= Humberto Padrón =

Cuban film director (born 1967)

Humberto Padrón

Humberto Padrón (born 1967) is a Cuban film director.

Padrón graduated from ISA (Superior Institute of Arts) in Havana. He has since directed several awards winning documentary shorts including "Y Todavia el Sueño" (1999) and "Los Zapaticos me Aprietan" (2000). In 2001 he directed his first fictional piece, a 47-minute independent featurette called "Video de Familia" (2001) which tells the story of a broken family that decides to send a video letter to a homosexual son who left for the US. The film's sincere approach to a taboo subject in Cuba, earned rave reviews from Cuban critics audiences alike, winning the Coral Award for Best Fiction Short Film at the 23rd International Festival of New Latin American Cinema. Best Short Film at the IV Latino Film Festival in Los Angeles, and was selected by Cuban critics as the Best National Film of 2001. His first feature, also shot independently, was "Frutas en el Café", premiered at the Festival de Gibara, Cuba, 2005.

In 2010 he worked as a Producer in TV Channels in the United States, such as Univision, Telemundo, Mega TV and America TV. He has also participated in the production of programs of recognized audience such as Esta Noche Tu Night, by Alexis Valdés and Caso Cerrado, by Dr. Ana María Polo.
