= Zombie in a Penguin Suit =

- Directed by: Chris Russell
- Based on: What's Black, White & Red All Over? by Hugo Garza
- Produced by: Chris Russell; Jared Stern; Josh Breslow; Jessica Mulder; Stephanie Stender; Jim Meegan; Arian Winn
- Starring: Michael Wetherbee
- Cinematography: Jim Meegan
- Music by: Marc Mellits
- Release date: October 14, 2011
- Running time: 7 minutes

Zombie in a Penguin Suit is a 2011 American short film directed by Chris Russell.

== Plot ==
The short film follows the path of an employee at the New England Aquarium dressed as a penguin that had become a zombie during the zombie apocalypse. He walks across long stretches of land, including a city street and a forest, and ends up in a suburban neighborhood where he is supposedly shot by someone who is surviving there. As the credits roll, a video plays of the aquarium worker before the zombie outbreak.

== Cast ==
- Michael Wetherbee as the Zombie
- Dave Meegan as the Trucker

During the credits, a list of names of the extras who portrayed other zombies in the film is given, stating: "Featuring a cornucopia of things living and/or dead, as portrayed by..."

== Reception ==
The short film was generally well received by viewers and was one of Film School Rejects' "11 Best Short Films of 2011". Gazelle Emami of The Huffington Post wrote that "by the end, it kind of makes you want to hug a zombie." Cyriaque Lamar of io9 said that "it will definitely make you sympathize with the ambulating vitality-deprived." Joe Berkowitz of Fast Company described it as an "oddly affecting take on a familiar genre."
