= Reach for the Sky (Social Distortion song) =

Single by Social Distortion

from the album Sex, Love and Rock 'n' Roll
- Released: August 31, 2004
- Recorded: 2000–2004
- Genre: Punk rock, skate punk
- Length: 3:31
- Label: Time Bomb Recordings
- Songwriter: Mike Ness
- Producers: Social Distortion, Cameron Webb

Social Distortion singles chronology
"Story of My Life (live version)" (1998)	"Reach for the Sky" (2004)	"Highway 101" (2004)

"Reach for the Sky" is a song by punk band Social Distortion from their 2004 album Sex, Love and Rock 'n' Roll. It was the album's first single. "Reach for the Sky" was released to radio on August 31, 2004, and reached number 27 on the Modern Rock Tracks in November 2004.

== Appearances ==
- "Coefficient of Drag," the first episode of Season 7 of The Shield.
- Midnight Club: Los Angeles
- Used as walk-up music by former New York Yankees outfielder Raúl Ibañez.
- Tony Hawk: Shred
- The opening montage for the AST Dew Tour.
- "Claim" (2008) by Matchstick Productions.
- Used in a scene on Season 4, episode 7 "Jinx" in Smallville

== Charts ==
=== Weekly charts ===
Weekly chart performance for "Reach for the Sky"
Chart (2004)	Peak position
US Alternative Airplay (Billboard)	27

=== Year-end charts ===
Year-end chart performance for "Reach for the Sky"
Chart (2005)	Position
US Modern Rock Tracks (Billboard)	77
