= Los zapaticos me aprietan =

Cuban documentary short film

- Directed by: Humberto Padrón
- Release date: 1999
- Running time: 6 minutes
- Country: Cuba

Los Zapaticos me Aprietan is a 1999 Cuban short film that uses documentary footage of people's shoes to convey a political message. The film was directed by Humberto Padrón.

Padrón filmed the six-minute short while he was a student at Havana's Superior Institute of Arts (ISA), and intercuts sped-up shots of people's feet in various kinds of shoes with footage of soldiers marching in boots, alongside a jazz soundtrack.

== Awards ==
- Mention for Sound Design, Festival CinePlaza, 1999
- Mention for Directing, Festival CinePlaza., 1999
- Gran Prize for Documentary, Festival CinePlaza, 1999
- Best Director in NON FICTION en Festival IMAGO, 1999
- Gran Premio de Dirección at Festival IMAGO, 1999.
- First Prize for Fiction at the National Festival of Cine Clubs Yumurí, 2000.
- Gran Prize Atenas at the National Festivals of Cine Clubs Yumurí, 2000.
- Vitral Prize for Best Experimental Film en el 13th Encuentro Nacional de Vídeo, 2000.

== See also ==
- List of Cuban films
