= Zen (2007 film) =

- Directed by: Gary Davis
- Written by: Gary Davis and Chin Li
- Produced by: Chocolate Star Entertainment Group
- Starring: Kit DeZolt; Vivian Kong; Lyndon Chan
- Music by: Matt Milne
- Distributed by: Traffic Entertainment Group
- Release date: February 23, 2007
- Running time: 90 minutes
- Language: English

Zen is a 2007 drama-horror film written and directed by Gary Davis and starring Kit DeZolt, Vivian Kong, and Lyndon Chan. Filmed in Florida, it was released and screened at a Boynton Beach, Florida cinema on April 12, 2007.

== Plot ==
In 17th-Century Japan, a young samurai, Master Mitzu Zen, learns the secret way of killing vampires while learning about women and life in general. Master Zen (Kit DeZolt), a naive master who doesn't know anything about women and love, goes on a quest to find out the truth about his parents' sacred sword. While meeting people along the way, he ends up running into more than he bargained for when he starts encountering vampires.

== Cast ==
- Kit DeZolt as Zen
- Vivian Kong as Keiko
- Lyndon Chan as Count Osaka
- Asia Chao as Goju
- Gilbert Henry as Lord Ito
- Scott Rogers as Old Man
- Radimus Ocean as Lord Mitzu
- Cindy Chang as Lady Mitzu
- Gerald Favis as Lord Yamazato

== Count Osaka ==
Davis' 2009 film Count Osaka is a sequel to Zen, with DeZolt reprising his role as the original film's title character. It premiered December 2, 2009. It aired as part of the first Royal Palm Independent Film Festival in early 2010.
