= The Zone (2003 film) =

- Directed by: Esaias Baitel
- Release date: 2003
- Running time: 10 minutes
- Country: Sweden

The Zone is a 2003 Swedish short film directed by photographer Esaias Baitel. Baitel lived in the Paris suburb of Aubervilliers during the 1970s and, in this short film, he documents what was later to become neo-Nazism.
