= Zombiez =

- Directed by: John Bacchus
- Written by: John Bacchus
- Starring: Jenicia Garcia; Jackeem Sellers; Randy Clarke
- Cinematography: Paul Swan
- Production company: Purgatory Blues
- Distributed by: Lionsgate Films
- Release date: May 17, 2005
- Running time: 83 minutes
- Country: United States
- Language: English

Zombiez is a 2005 American horror film written and directed by John Bacchus (credited as ZWS). It stars Jenicia Garcia, Jackeem Sellers, and Randy Clarke. The film follows a woman who battles zombies and a deranged scientist to save her husband.

== Plot ==
After zombies kill her coworkers at a construction site, Josephine flees to her home, where she and her husband attempt to defend themselves. Both are captured, but Josephine escapes. She navigates a city overrun by the undead and eventually returns to rescue her husband from a mad scientist known as The Dr., who claims to control the zombies. Josephine defeats The Dr. in a final confrontation.

== Cast ==
- Jenicia Garcia as Josephine
- Jackeem Sellers as The Dr.
- Randy Clarke as Steve
- Raymond Spencer as Terry

== Production ==
The film was produced by Purgatory Blues, a small independent studio. Director John Bacchus, known for low-budget exploitation films, used the pseudonym ZWS for this project. The film was shot in urban and industrial locations in New York City, using guerrilla-style techniques and minimal crew.

== Release ==
Lionsgate Films released Zombiez direct-to-video on May 17, 2005.

== Reception ==
Zombiez received overwhelmingly negative reviews from critics and audiences.

- Jon Condit of Dread Central rated it 0/5 stars, calling it "the absolute worst of the direct-to-video horror genre".
- David Walker of DVD Talk also rated it 0/5 stars, writing, "There is nothing good to say about this garbage."
- Peter Dendle described it as "pointless and uninteresting, with no discernible sense of love for the topic."
- Mark H. Harris of Black Horror Movies criticized the dialogue as "improvised, resulting in repetition, clichés, awkward silence, and repetition."

Despite its poor reception, the film has gained minor cult status among fans of low-budget zombie cinema for its unintentional humor and chaotic editing.
