= Xennials (film) =

- Promotional release poster
- Directed by: Paula Chávez
- Written by: Paula Chávez
- Cinematography: Laura Correa
- Edited by: Alessandra Gamarra
- Music by: Proyecto PauCar; Sonoptero
- Production company: Willay Audio y Video
- Release date: January 21, 2021 (NIFF)
- Running time: 100 minutes
- Country: Peru
- Language: Spanish

Xennials is a 2021 Peruvian documentary film written and directed by Paula Chávez in her directorial debut. It follows three Lima women from the middle-class Xennial micro generation and the way they perceive and experience their time.

== Synopsis ==
Three portraits, three women from different parts of the city of Lima belonging to the Xennial generation, who through their experiences show us how they perceive time today by analyzing their own life stories. Their routines, combined with their daily reflections, build their own temporalities, recognizing themselves as women within society.

== Release ==
Xennials had its world premiere on January 21, 2021, at the 9th Noida International Film Festival, then screened on September 24, 2021, 2nd Lima Alterna International Film Festival.

== Accolades ==
Year	Award / Festival	Category	Recipient	Result	Ref.
2021	9th Noida International Film Festival	Special Festival Mention (Documentary)	Xennials	Won	
