= Zero Killed =

- Film poster
- Directed by: Michal Kosakowski
- Written by: Michal Kosakowski
- Produced by: Michal Kosakowski
- Starring: Uli Aigner; Aylin Ayaz; Teresa Behr; Dietmar Beinhauer; Dorothée Berghaus; Max Boehme; Barbara Braun; David Bruckner; Michele Cavaliere; Therese Davies
- Cinematography: Michal Kosakowski
- Edited by: Michal Kosakowski; Claudia Engl
- Music by: Paolo Marzocchi
- Release date: 14 June 2012
- Running time: 81 minutes
- Countries: Germany; Austria
- Languages: German; Polish; English

Zero Killed is a 2012 German documentary and crime film directed by Michal Kosakowski and starring Uli Aigner, Aylin Ayaz, Teresa Behr, Dietmar Beinhauer and Dorothée Berghaus.

== Cast ==
In alphabetical order

- Uli Aigner
- Aylin Ayaz
- Teresa Behr
- Dietmar Beinhauer
- Dorothée Berghaus
- Max Boehme
- Barbara Braun
- David Bruckner
- Michele Cavaliere
- Therese Davies
