= Zaza Rising =

- Produced by: Lena Strothe
- Starring: Christine Nyirahabimana
- Release date: 2017 (Rwanda)
- Country: Rwanda

Zaza Rising is a 2017 Rwandan short film produced by Lena Strothe.

== Synopsis ==
Christine Nyirahabimana, starts a small bakery in rural Rwanda and hires 10 HIV positive, single mothers as her employees. She inspires as an example of how one individual can eradicate poverty despite all odds.

== Festivals ==
- Virginia Film Festival, 2018
- Sydney Indie Film Festival, 2018
- African Diaspora Film Festival, 2018

== External ==
Zara Rising at IMDb
