= Yes, We Fuck! =

2015 Spanish documentary film

- Film poster
- Directed by: Antonio Centeno; Raúl de la Morena
- Cinematography: Raúl de la Morena
- Music by: Sònia Basco; Raúl Morales
- Release date: 2015
- Running time: 59 minutes
- Country: Spain
- Languages: Spanish, Catalan

Yes, We Fuck! is a 2015 Spanish documentary film directed by Antonio Centeno and Raúl de la Morena. The title parodies the famous slogan of the 2008 presidential campaign of Barack Obama, yes, we can.

== Plot ==
The documentary explores the sexuality of people with functional diversity. Through six stories, different topics are addressed, including the experience of one's sexuality, life as a couple, postpornography, prostitution or sexual assistance among others.

The use of explicit sexual images aims to break with the hegemonic vision that keeps disabled people in a state of permanent infantilization, showing that not only they have desiring bodies which may also be desirable, but that these bodies can create new political imaginaries that redefine concepts such as masculinity, eroticism or even democracy.

== Awards and festivals ==
| Festival | Country | Category | Result |
|---|---|---|---|
| Barcelona Creative Commons Film Festival 2015 | Spain | – | Included |
| Festival de Cine Independiente de Barcelona – l'Alternativa 2015 | Spain | – | Included |
| Pornfilmfestival Berlin 2015 | Germany | Best documentary | Won |
| FlixxFest International Film Festival 2015 | United States | Best LGBT documentary | Won |
| Mostra la Ploma 2016 | Spain | – | Included |
| Festival Zinegoak 2016 | Spain | – | Included |
| Fish and Chips Film Festival 2016 | Italy | Best documentary | Won |
| BFI Flare: London LGBTQ+ Film Festival 2016 | United Kingdom | – | Included |
| La Fête du Slip – Festival des Sexualities 2016 | Switzerland | – | Included |
| Festival PopPorn 2016 | Brazil | – | Included |
