= Yama—Attack to Attack =

- Directed by: Mitsuo Sato, Kyoichi Yamaoka
- Release date: 1985
- Running time: 110 minutes
- Country: Japan
- Language: Japanese

Yama—Attack to Attack (山谷─やられたらやりかえせ, San'ya—Yararetara Yarikaese) is a 1985 color documentary film produced about day laborers in Japan. The two directors were murdered by the yakuza.

== Documentary ==
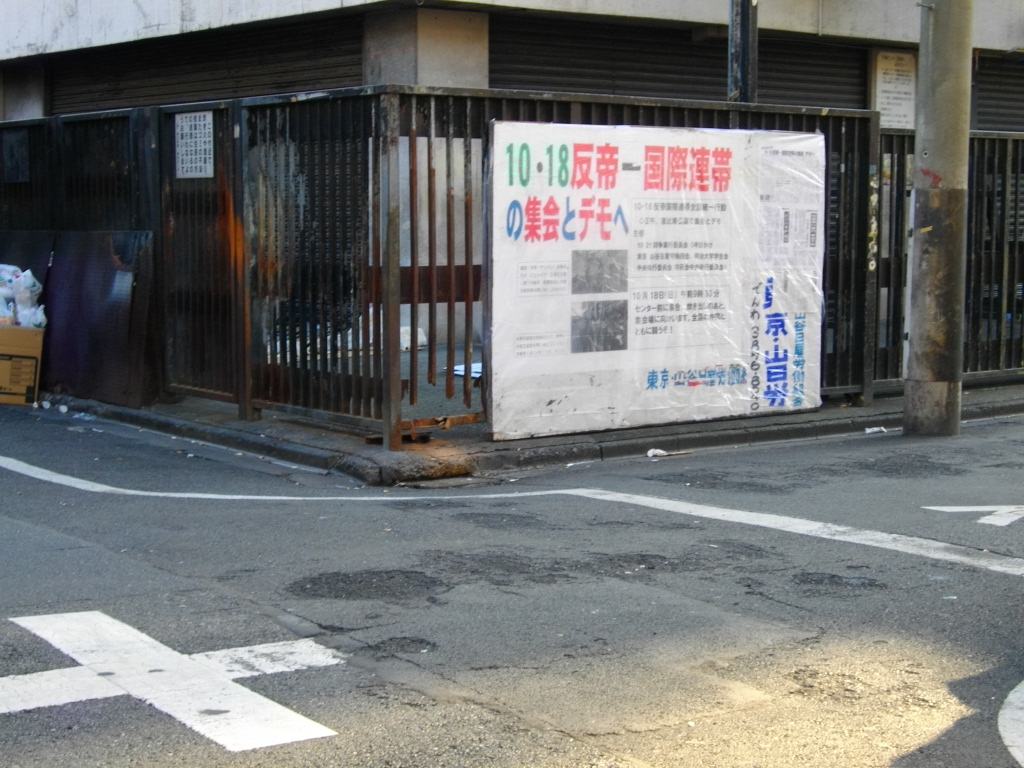
Current-day laborers union call for a demonstration, in San'ya

Most of the documentary shows the living and hiring conditions of day laborers in San'ya, a neighbourhood of Tokyo. It also includes protests, confrontation with yakuza, and celebrations.

The last part shows the situation of day laborers in other Japanese cities (Kotobuki-cho in Yokohama, Sasajima in Nagoya, Kamagasaki in Osaka, Chikko in Hakata) and the history of a former day labour area where many Korean workers lived.

== Making ==
Mitsuo Sato spent a few weeks in San'ya before starting to record in December 1984. Day laborers just happened to have a confrontation with yakuza who wanted to control the labour market, so Sato recorded both sides of the events. On December 22 of the same year, Sato was murdered by a member of the yakuza group and right-wing organization Kokusui-kai Kanamachi-ikka Nishido-gumi (国粋会金町一家西戸組).

After the murder of Sato, Kyoichi Yamaoka took over and the documentary was completed in November 1985, then premièred a month later.

Yamaoka in turn was murdered by a member of the Kokusui-kai-kei Kanamachi-ikka Kinryu-gumi (国粋会系金町一家金竜組) on January 13, 1986.

== Screenings ==
The film has been the focus of a "screening movement" to present the film in Japan and abroad. Among other places, it has been screened at the 1997 Yamagata International Documentary Film Festival, as well as in New York and Kraków. The film is not available on DVD (except for backup purposes) or commercialized in any format, the only way to watch it is to attend a screening.

Yamaoka's notes and essays were published as a book in 1996.
