= Zombie Undead =

- Directed by: Rhys Davies
- Written by: Kris Tearse
- Produced by: Rhys Davies
- Starring: Ruth King; Kris Tearse; Rod Duncan; Barry Thomas; Sandra Wildbore; Christopher J. Herbert
- Cinematography: Neill Phillips
- Music by: David Fellows; Kris Tearse
- Production company: Hive Films
- Release date: 15 January 2010 (UK)
- Running time: 79 minutes
- Country: United Kingdom
- Language: English

Zombie Undead is a 2010 British horror film directed by Rhys Davies and starring Ruth King, Kris Tearse, Rod Duncan, Barry Thomas, Sandra Wildbore, and Christopher J. Herbert. It was written by Kris Tearse. After a terrorist attack in Leicester, survivors take cover from zombies.

== Premise ==
After a terrorist attack, Sarah takes her injured father to a busy and overworked hospital, only to lose consciousness during the stressful attempt to save his life. When she comes to, the hospital seems deserted. Sarah quickly discovers that zombies have taken over the building, and, along with other survivors, flees the hospital and attempts to survive against the undead hordes.

== Cast ==
- Ruth King as Sarah
- Kris Tearse as Jay
- Barry Thomas as Steve
- Christopher J. Herbert as Phil
- Steven Dolton as Farmer
- Sandra Wildbore as Mary

== Production ==
Zombie Undead was filmed in Leicester. Filming lasted for 18 months. The filmmakers tried to avoid exposition and focus on the characters.

== Release ==
Zombie Undead premiered in Leicester on 15 January 2010 and opened in British theaters in April 2011. Metrodome Distribution released it on DVD on 30 May 2011. MVD Entertainment Group released it on DVD in the US on 24 July 2012. In its opening weekend, it took in a total of £10.

== Reception ==
Tom Huddleston of Time Out London rated it 1/5 stars and called it a clichéd and "laughably inept DIY horror movie". Jamie Russell of Total Film rated it 2/5 stars and wrote, "Zombie Undead is another no-budget, no-brains outing to treat the walking dead as an excuse for a lack of writing ability." Mark L. Miller of Ain't It Cool News called it "a breath of fresh air" but it was sloppy and poorly acted. Jeremy Blitz of DVD Talk rated it 2/5 stars and wrote, "Unfortunately, the producers of British indie Zombie Undead present little new material, though they do show a few flashes of near brilliance." Peter Dendle called it a boring zombie film that was made for marketing purposes.
