= Zombie Planet =

- Directed by: George Bonilla
- Screenplay by: George Bonilla
- Produced by: Russell Coy II; Tammy Bonilla; Douglas Campbell; Xyliena Praetor
- Starring: Frank Farhat; Christopher Rose; Matt Perry; Rebecca Minton; Karl Gustav Lindstrom
- Cinematography: Billy W. Blackwell; Todd Burrows; Jon Shelton; Roy M. White
- Edited by: Sven Granlund; Matthew Perry
- Music by: Klevin Scott
- Production company: ZP Productions
- Distributed by: Tempe Entertainment
- Release date: October 19, 2004
- Running time: 119 minutes
- Country: United States
- Language: English

Zombie Planet is a 2004 American horror film directed and written by George Bonilla. Frank Farhat stars as a zombie hunter in a post-apocalyptic world. The film also stars Christopher Rose, Matt Perry, Rebecca Minton, and Karl Gustav Lindstrom.

== Premise ==
After a pharmaceutical company develops a new wonder drug, its customers turn into zombies. T. K. Kane, a mysterious outsider, arrives in a community terrorized by local warlord Adam. Kane protects the community and hunts down the zombies plaguing the community.

== Cast ==
- Frank Farhat as T. K. Kane
- Christopher Rose as Warren
- Matthew Perry as Adam
- Rebecca Minton as Julie
- Karl Gustav Lindstrom as Frank
- Jon Noel Shelton as Stiletto
- Fran Rabe as Mary
- Rhonda Barker as Rose

== Production ==
Director George Bonilla was inspired to make a zombie film after moving to Kentucky and finding a supportive independent film community there. Bonilla believed that zombies created from a defective drug would allow for a wide variety of effects on people, and allowed him to write in both feral and intelligent zombies. The cast and crew were mainly made up of people with no experience in filmmaking. Scenes were shot at the Bluegrass Aspendale housing project in Lexington, Kentucky. Bonilla's wife Tammy is the executive producer.

== Release ==
Zombie Planet was distributed by J. R. Bookwalter's Tempe Entertainment. It was released on DVD on October 19, 2004.

== Reception ==
Peter Dendle called the film "epically awful" and embarrassing for Lexington natives. David Johnson of DVD Verdict said that the film is better than most Z movies, but its length leads to too much filler. Bill Gibron of DVD Talk rated the film 3/5 stars and said that "there are kernels of creativity and outright cleverness in this big, sloppy ersatz-spectacle."
