= ZTS: State of Entropy =

- Directed by: Stefanos Stefanidis
- Written by: Shane Kavanagh; Stefanos Stefanidis
- Produced by: Ulla Decken; Shane Kavanagh
- Starring: Jai Koutrae; Glen Davenport
- Cinematography: Peter Coleman
- Edited by: Shane Kavanagh
- Music by: Adrian Henderson
- Distributed by: Entropy Films
- Release date: 20 December 2002 (Australia)
- Running time: 81 minutes
- Country: Australia
- Language: English
- Budget: $85,000 AUD

ZTS: State of Entropy is a 2002 Australian drama film directed by Stefanos Stefanidis and starring Jai Koutrae and Glen Davenport.

== Cast ==
- Jai Koutrae ... Glen
- Glen Davenport ... Mark
- David Gambin ... Colin
- Stacey Giaprakas ... Nick
