= Reach for the Sky (2001 film) =

2001 Israeli documentary film

- Directed by: Ronit Weiss Berkowitz
- Written by: Assa Lizka
- Produced by: Nelka Films
- Release date: 2001
- Running time: 52 minutes
- Language: Hebrew with English subtitles

Reach for the Sky is a 2001 Israeli documentary film which follows a group of young Israelis as they struggle to become pilots in their nation's army. But after all that they go through, only some will enjoy the honor of wearing those wings. The rest will be ordinary soldiers. After the six days are over, they sit the young soldiers down, and in a frank tone the leading officer reads off everyone's names, telling them bluntly whether they passed or failed.

== Summary ==
Pilots in the Israeli army are so highly esteemed that young men and women are willing to subject themselves to days of torturous drills and exercises for a chance at flying planes. Reach for the Sky follows one group of young people as they suffer through never-ending runs and midnight push-ups to prove they are tough enough to hack it in the Air Force.

The film shows how a group of seemingly average high school graduates are molded into obedient soldiers, capable of enduring extreme physical pain. But, despite all their hard work, only some of them will become pilots. The rest will go home disappointed.

Every grueling day is a test of the young men and women's will, but one drill especially separates out the weak from the strong — an endless run up and down one hill known as “the Trig.” The young hopefuls start off in a sprint, but over time their pace slows. The grueling path goes on for so long and is so difficult that the viewer realizes the true feat is not maintaining one's speed – it is continuing to move at all. One girl stops only after passing out. She says she decided that as long as she was conscious, she was going to keep moving her body. Another girl explains that she felt like she “couldn’t breathe” but continued walking anyway, surprising herself. “I don’t know, I must have inner strength,” she says.

== See also ==
Other documentaries concerning the Israeli army:

- The Land of the Settlers
- At the Green Line
- My Dearest Enemy
- On the Edge of Peace
