= Zvony z rákosu =

1950 film

- Directed by: Václav Kubásek
- Written by: Václav Kubásek; Jirí Maránek; Robert Vyhlídka
- Release date: 1950
- Running time: 86 minute
- Country: Czechoslovakia

Zvony z rákosu is a 1950 Czech drama film.

== Cast ==
- Frantisek Klika
- Meda Valentová
- Viktor Ocásek
- Marie Brozová
- Otto Cermák
- Emil Dlesk
