= The Land of the Settlers =

- Directed by: Chaim Yavin
- Original language: Hebrew

Production
- Producer: Chaim Yavin
- Running time: 120 min. several parts

Original release
- Release: 30 May 2005 – 2005

The Land of the Settlers is a five-part documentary series created by Chaim Yavin, who was described by the Arab News as "the Israeli version of America's Walter Cronkite". With a handheld camera, Yavin traveled throughout his homeland of Israel and interviewed a range of Palestinians and Israelis in order to document the Israeli–Palestinian conflict. Released in 2005, his series was too controversial to air on Israel's public TV station, Channel 1, despite the fact that he had helped to create the station and served as its lead anchorman. It ran instead on Channel 2, creating a stir for its sympathy towards Palestinians.

== Summary ==
"The message of the series was," Yavin explains, "If we want peace, we have to dismantle the settlements."

In Part 1, Yavin travels through the West Bank, inviting himself into the homes of both Israelis and Palestinians in order to get a highly personal look at the conflict. Both the Palestinians and Israeli settlers tell Yavin that their lives are being toyed with because of their ethnicity, without respect for the fact that they are human beings, with rooted families and established lives. Palestinians on line at a checkpoint complain to the camera that the four-hour wait they're enduring in the hot sun is common, while an Israel mother rants, "I think Jews that vote to evacuate us from our homes should come and talk to us. If they looked us in the eyes before they did, I think I'd feel differently."

PART 2 focuses on Hebron, Abraham's ancient home, a holy city where the Palestinian majority is held suspect and monitored by the heavily armed Israeli Defense Force, hinting at a strange role reversal of the Jewish population since the Second World War. There, Yavin films a concrete wall where someone wrote in spraypaint, "Arabs to the crematorium." There's hate on both sides, but Yavin's documentary asks to what extent have the oppressed become the oppressors.

Part 2 highlights the suffering of mothers on both sides of the conflict. If they haven't experienced the heartbreak of losing a child, they worry constantly about their children's safety. Yavin speaks to a weepy Palestinian woman in Hebron whose still mourning the loss of her fourteen-year-old girl. The smiling, lanky girl was shot by rioting settlers and fell off her roof. An Israeli mother shares the similarly disturbing story of watching her seven-year-old son run up to her covered in blood after having been shot by a sniper. But instead of channeling their sorrow and pain to try to change the failing system of hate, their experiences have filled them with loathing for their enemies that perpetuates the conflict. For example, an Israeli mother argues, as she bobs her baby on her lap, that the Arabs should be bombed indiscriminately to insure her children's safety.

PART 3 follows the Israeli government's construction of the Israeli West Bank barrier surrounding the nation's major cities, creating a physical barrier between the two cultures. Israelis call it a security fence—Palestinians call it proof of a system of Israeli apartheid. This documentary begins with an interview of an Israeli woman whose husband and two sons were murdered by a suicide bomber. She tells the story from her balcony, from where she can see the restaurant in which it happened. When Yavin asks her opinion of the fence, she says her heart "curdles." "Why wasn't it built earlier? Why did I have to pay such a dear price so that we could wise up later?"

Part 3 raises the question as to whether the fence is in fact being built for security purposes or if it has political motives. Instead of running along the green line, Israel's official border, it extends into Palestinian land, which one Palestinian argues is a "robbery of land and resources." One Israeli official, nicknamed "the father of the fence," explains that they extended they boundary in order to make sure that guards have enough time to stop a person from crossing. The fence is likened to the Berlin Wall.

Yavin, also known as Mr. Television, has been reporting on the Israeli-Palestinian conflict for decades, but, until the release of this series, he's kept his political opinions to himself. These films were made with his hope to inspire moral change in his countrymen. "I cannot really do anything to relieve this misery other than to document it," Yavin says, "so that neither I nor those like me will be able to say that we saw nothing, heard nothing, knew nothing."

== Reception ==
- New York Times described it as "pessimistic, angry and highly personal."
- Lewis Roth with Americans for Peace Now said, "has had an impact in Israel because of what you see on the screen, but also because of who made it. Chaim Yavin has been Israel's lead newscaster, and probably one of the best-known voices and faces in the Jewish community."
- Tom Segev of Ha'aretz (5/27/05) wrote, "For two and half years, Yavin wandered the West Bank and the Gaza Strip with a small hand-held camera, which he operated himself, without a technical crew. Here and there he was reviled as the representative of the hostile leftist media, but in general the settlers spoke to him on the assumption that he was their man, and justly so: Until now he was everyone's man."
- Raanan Shaked of Yedioth Ahronoth (6/1/05), wrote, "After watching The Land of the Settlers, every caring Israeli, every humane Israeli, should get up next Saturday, go to the settlement nearest to his place of residence, and drag its inhabitants, kicking and screaming, across the road to the side of sanity.
- Assaf Schneider of Ma'ariv (6/1/05) wrote, "The documentation with the small Sony camera is an effective trick that always works. … The difference is that here, it all comes together to present one unappealing idea: Disengagement has taken place long ago. Thirty years ago, to be precise, when the first settlers remained in Sebastia. Only it is a disengagement by them from Israel, from Israeliness. They let it slip now and then, when they talk contemptuously about 'those who live in Tel Aviv and Haifa,' when they threaten matter-of-factly to burn their ID cards, when they call anyone who is not them 'a generation of wusses,' when they fail to understand why Yavin does not want a day to come when 'Mohammed will make us all coffee.' The feeling is harsh: After all, it is true that 'we are brothers,' and the Israeli governments over the generations did indeed send them…"

== See also ==
Other documentaries about Israel:

- At the Green Line
- Lullaby
- Nadia's Friend
- On the Edge of Peace
- Reach for the Sky
