= At the Green Line =

- Directed by: Jesse Atlas
- Produced by: Eyal Dimant
- Release date: 2005
- Running time: 52 minutes
- Country: Israel
- Languages: English; Arabic; Hebrew

At the Green Line is a 2005 Israeli documentary made by Jesse Atlas that profiles several members of Courage to Refuse, a political group whose members refuse to serve in the Israeli military because of moral opposition to its policies. In addition, it features several Israelis on active service in the military as part of their reserve duty. The title refers to the 1949 Armistice line established between Israel and Syria, the Jordanian-held West Bank, and the then Egyptian-held Gaza Strip. The latter have been referred to as the Occupied Territories.

== Description ==
The 53-minute film explores the conflict between Israelis and Palestinians from the perspective of soldiers in the Israeli Defence Forces. Specifically, those who refuse service discuss their motivations, and soldiers who are actively serving also speak about their feelings. Some describe the conflict between trying to treat Palestinians fairly while being a member of an enemy, occupying force.

"You have two different conversations running at the same time," a commanding officer explains, "One is: 'how can I be an effective soldier and protect my country by finding the terrorists?' And at the same time: 'how to be a human being that honors the lives of the Palestinians?'"

In Israel, all 18-year-olds must enter the military to serve. They see this as the end of childhood. As noted in a review of the film, "You get a rifle in your hands," another soldier remarks, "And you're with it twenty-four hours a day and seven days a week. And that's it. No more childhood."

The film explores various issues related to suicide bombings, daily treatment of Arabs at IDF checkpoints, and the West Bank barrier constructed in the early 21st century.

== Reception ==
- The Jewish Channel noted that "The documentary explores the unique situation of Israel's youth: After having grown up in a nation full of violence, every eighteen-year-old must enter the Israeli Army, marking the end of their childhood." It said, " At The Green Line brings its audience deep inside this question in a way no film has before – and discovers that even for those making life-and-death decisions every day, there are no clear answers."
- "A beautifully shot and crafted documentary! 'At the Green Line' is a fascinating look at the Courage to Refuse movement… The documentary possesses an immediacy rare in many pieces on the Occupied Territories." – Al Jadid: A Review & Record of Arab Culture and Arts
- "At the Green Line brings up important issues that should not be brushed aside and it does so in a way that elicits discussion more than confrontation. The effort is laudable." – Cynthia Ramsay, Jewish Independent

== Festivals and awards ==
The following list is given by Cinema Guild:

- Winner, Best Film - Conflict & Resolution,
- Hamptons International, Film Festival, 2005
- Winner, Best Doc (short), Doxa Documentary Film Festival, 2005
- Official Selection, Toronto Jewish Film Festival, 2005
- Official Selection, Boston Jewish Film Festival, 2005
