= List of zombie films =

Zombie films are a film sub-genre centered around zombies, fictional anthropophagous creatures usually portrayed as reanimated corpses or virally infected human beings. While zombie films generally fall into the horror genre, some cross over into other genres, such as comedy, science fiction, thriller, or romance. Distinct types of zombie films have evolved, such as the "zombie comedy" (Zom Com), "romantic comedy with zombies" (Rom Com Zom) and "zombie apocalypse". Zombies are distinct from other undead creatures such as ghosts, ghouls, mummies, Frankenstein's monsters or vampires, so this list does not include films devoted to these.

Victor Halperin's White Zombie, released in 1932, is often cited as the first zombie film.

== Films ==
Title	Director	Year	Notes	References
#Alive	Il Cho	2020	Based on the original script for Alone	
3 Hours Till Dead	Jason Mills	2016		
The 8th Plague	Franklin Guerrero Jr.	2006		
13 Eerie	Lowell Dean	2013		
28 Days Later	Danny Boyle	2002	United Kingdom; Infected humans	
28 Hours Later: The Zombie Movie	Daniel M. Seibert	2010	United States;	
28 Weeks Later	Juan Carlos Fresnadillo	2007	United Kingdom; Sequel to 28 Days Later	
28 Years Later	Danny Boyle	2025	United Kingdom; Sequel to 28 Weeks Later	
28 Years Later: The Bone Temple	Nia DaCosta	2026	United Kingdom; Sequel to 28 Years Later	
Abraham Lincoln vs. Zombies	Richard Schenkman	2012	United States; Mockbuster of Abraham Lincoln: Vampire Hunter	
After Sundown	Christopher Abram & Michael W. Brown	2006	United States;	
Alien Dead	Fred Olen Ray	1980		
All Souls Day	Jeremy Kasten	2005		
Almost Dead	Giorgio Bruno	2016		
Alone	Johnny Martin	2020		
The Amazing Adventures of the Living Corpse	Justin Paul Ritter	2012		
American Zombie	Grace Lee	2007		
Ang Huling Henya	Marlon Rivera	2013		
Anger of the Dead	Francesco Picone	2015		
Anna and the Apocalypse	John McPhail	2017		
Anonymous Zombie	Richard McQueen	2018		
Apocalypse Z: The Beginning of the End (Apocalypse Z: El principio del fin)	Carles Torrens	2024		
Aquarium of the Dead	Glenn Miller	2021		
Army of the Dead	Zack Snyder	2021		
Army of Frankensteins	Ryan Bellgardt	2013		
Army of Thieves	Matthias Schweighöfer	2021	Prequel to Army of the Dead	
The Astro-Zombies	Ted V. Mikels	1968		
Attack of the Southern Fried Zombies	Mark Newton	2017		
Automaton Transfusion	Steven C. Miller	2006		
Autumn	Steven Rumbelow	2009		
Baron Blood (Gli orrori del castello di Norimberga)	Mario Bava	1972	Blood day	
Bath Salt Zombies	Dustin Mills	2013	Drug turns people into flesh-eating zombies	
The Battery	Jeremy Gardner	2012		
Battle Girl: The Living Dead in Tokyo Bay (Batoru gâru)	Kazuo Komizu	1991		
Battle of the Damned	Christopher Hatton	2013	Robots fighting zombies	
Battlefield Baseball (Jigoku Kôshien)	Yūdai Yamaguchi	2003		
Beneath Still Waters	Brian Yuzna	2005		
Beneath the Surface	Blake Reigle	2007		
Beverly Hills Bodysnatchers	Jonathan Mostow	1989		
Beverly Lane	Joshua Hull	2010		
The Beyond	Lucio Fulci	1981	Second film in The Gates of Hell trilogy	
Beyond Re-Animator	Brian Yuzna	2003		
Big Tits Zombie (Big Tits Dragon: Hot Spring Zombie vs. Stripper 5)	Takao Nakano	2010		
Bio Zombie (Sun faa sau si)	Wilson Yip	1998		
Biohazardous	Michael J. Hein	2001		
Black Demons (Dèmoni 3)	Umberto Lenzi	1991	Unrelated to the Demoni films by Lamberto Bava	
Black Magic 2 (Gou hun jiang tou, Revenge of the Zombies)	Ho Meng Hua	1976		
Black Sheep	Jonathan King	2006	Zombie sheep	
Black Swarm (Night of the Drones)	David Winning	2007		
Bled White	Jose Carlos Gomez	2011		
Block Z	Mikhail Red	2020	Undead viral outbreak	
Blood Creek (Creek, Town Creek)	Joel Schumacher	2009		
Blood of the Beast	Georg Koszulinski	2003		
Blood of Ghastly Horror	Al Adamson	1972		
Blood Quantum	Jeff Barnaby	2019	Social effects of a zombie outbreak on a First Nations community who are physically immune to it	
Bloodlust Zombies	Dan Lantz	2011	Starring Alexis Texas	
Bloodsuckers from Outer Space	Glen Coburn	1984		
Blue Demon y Zovek en La invasión de los muertos (The Invasion of the Dead)	René Cardona	1973		
Bone Sickness	Brian Paulin	2004		
The Boneyard	James Cummins	1990		
Bong of the Dead	Thomas Newman	2011		
The Book of Zombie	Scott Kragelund, Paul Cranefield, Erik Van Sant	2009		
Bowery at Midnight	Wallace Fox	1942		
Boy Eats Girl	Stephen Bradley	2005		
Brain Blockers	Lincoln Kupchak	2007		
Brain Dead	Kevin Tenney	2007		
Brain Freeze	Julien Knafo	2021		
Braindead (Dead Alive)	Peter Jackson	1992	First zombie movie from New Zealand	
Bride of Re-Animator	Brian Yuzna	1990		
Broken Springs (Broken Springs: Shrine of the Undead Zombie Bastards)	Neeley Lawson	2009		
Bubba's Chili Parlor	Jason Mills	2008		
Bullets for the Dead	Michael Du-Shane	2015		
Burial Ground: The Nights of Terror	Andrea Bianchi	1981		
The Burning Dead	Rene Perez	2015		
Burying The Ex	Joe Dante	2014		
The Cabin in the Woods	Drew Goddard	2011	United States; Zombies only minor to the plot	
Cargo	Ben Howling and Yolanda Ramke	2017		
Carnival of Souls	Herk Harvey	1962		
Caustic Zombies	Johnny Daggers	2011		
Cell	Tod Williams	2016		
Cemetery Man (Dellamorte Dellamore)	Michele Soavi	1994		
The Child	Robert Voskanian	1977		
The Children	Max Kalmanowicz	1980		
Children of the Living Dead	Tor Ramsey	2001		
Children Shouldn't Play with Dead Things	Bob Clark	1972		
Choking Hazard	Marek Dobes	2004		
Chopper Chicks in Zombietown	Dan Hoskins	1989		
Christmas with the Dead	Terrill Lee Lankford	2012		
C.H.U.D. II: Bud the C.H.U.D.	David Irving	1989		
City of the Living Dead	Lucio Fulci	1980	First film in The Gates of Hell trilogy	
City of Rott	Frank Sudol	2006		
Cockneys vs Zombies	Matthias Hoene	2012		
Colin	Marc Price	2008		
Collapse	MJ Dixon	2011		
Contracted	Eric England	2013		
Contracted: Phase II	Josh Forbes	2015		
Cooties	Jonathan Milott & Cary Murnion	2015		
Hidden	Matt Duffer & Ross Duffer	2015		
The Corpse Eaters	Donald R. Passmore & Klaus Vetter	1974		
Corona Zombies	Charles Band	2020		
Corpses Are Forever	Jose Prendes	2004		
The Crazies	Breck Eisner	2010	Remake; infected humans	
Creature with the Atom Brain	Edward L. Cahn	1955		
Creepshow	George A. Romero	1982	Anthology film	
The Cross of the Devil	John Gilling	1975		
The Crypt	Craig McMahon	2009		
The Cured	David Freyne	2017		
The Curse of the Doll People (Muñecos Infernales)	Benito Alazraki	1961		
Curse of the Living Dead (Les Démoniaques)	Jean Rollin	1973		
Curse of the Maya (Dawn of the Living Dead, Evil Grave: Curse of the Maya)	David Heavener	2004		
Dance of the Dead	Gregg Bishop	2008		
Dark Floors	Pete Riski	2008		
Dark Harvest	Paul Moore	2004		
Dawn of the Dead	George A. Romero	1978	First sequel to Night of the Living Dead	
Dawn of the Dead	Zack Snyder	2004	Remake	
Dawn of the Mummy	Frank Agrama	1981		
Dawning of the Dead	Tony Jopia	2017		
Day of the Dead	George A. Romero	1985	Second sequel to Night of the Living Dead	
Day of the Dead	Steve Miner	2008	Remake	
Day of the Dead 2: Contagium	Ana Clavell & James Glenn Dudelson	2005	United States; Unofficial sequel to Day of the Dead	
Day of the Dead: Bloodline	Hèctor Hernández Vicens	2018	United States; Remake	
Day Zero	Joey De Guzman, Agung Gede	2022		
Daylight's End	William Kaufman	2016		
Days of Darkness	Jake Kennedy	2007		
The Dead	Howard J. Ford & Jonathan Ford	2010		
The Dead 2: India	Howard J. Ford & Jonathan Ford	2013		
Dead 7	Nick Carter	2016		
Dead Air	Corbin Bernsen	2009		
Dead & Breakfast	Matthew Leutwyler	2004		
Dead & Buried	Gary Sherman	1981		
The Dead and the Damned	Rene Perez	2010		
The Dead and the Damned 2	Rene Perez	2014		
Dead and Deader	Patrick Dinhut	2006		
Dead Before Dawn	April Mullen	2012	Half-zombie, half-demon creature	
The Dead Don't Die	Curtis Harrington	1975	Voodoo zombies	
The Dead Don't Die	Jim Jarmusch	2019		
Dead Earth (Paradise Z)	Wych Kaosayananda	2020		
The Dead Hate the Living!	Dave Parker	2000		
Dead Heat	Mark Goldblatt	1988		
Dead Meat	Conor McMahon	2004		
Dead Men Walking	Peter Mervis	2005		
Dead Moon Rising	Mark E. Poole	2007		
The Dead Next Door	J. R. Bookwalter	1989		
The Dead One (Blood of the Zombie)	Barry Mahon	1961		
The Dead Outside	Kerry Anne Mullaney	2008		
The Dead Pit	Brett Leonard	1989		
Dead Rising: Endgame	Pat Williams	2016	Sequel to Dead Rising: Watchtower	
Dead Rising: Watchtower	Zach Lipovsky	2015		
Dead Sands	Ameera Al Qaed	2013		
Dead Shack	Peter Ricq	2017		
Dead Snow	Tommy Wirkola	2009	Nazi zombies	
Dead Snow 2: Red vs. Dead	Tommy Wirkola	2014		
Dead Space: Downfall	Chuck Patton	2008	Animated film based on Dead Space video game	
Dead Trigger	Mike Cuff & Scott Windhauser	2017		
Deadgirl	Marcel Sarmiento & Gadi Harel	2008		
DeadHeads	Brett Pierce & Drew T. Pierce	2011		
Deadly Friend	Wes Craven	1986		
Deadman Inferno (Z Island)	Hiroshi Shinagawa	2015		
Death Walks	Spencer Hawken	2016		
Death Warmed Up	David Blyth	1984		
Deathdream (Dead of Night)	Bob Clark	1974		
Deathwatch	Michael J. Bassett	2002		
Decay	Luke Thompson	2012		
Deep River: The Island	Ben Bachelder	2009		
Descendents (Solos)	Jorge Olguín	2008	Billed as first-ever Chilean zombie film	
Detention of the Dead	Alex Craig Mann	2012		
Devil Fetus 2: The Rape After	Ho Meng Hua & Moon-Tong Lau	1984		
The Devil's Daughter (Pocomania)	Arthur H. Leonard	1939	Semi-remake of Ouanga	
Devil's Playground	Mark McQueen	2010		
Diary of the Dead	George A. Romero	2007	Fourth sequel to Night of the Living Dead	
Die and Let Live	Justin Channell	2006		
Die You Zombie Bastards!	Caleb Emerson	2005		
Die Zombiejäger	Jonas Wolcher	2005	First zombie movie from Sweden	
Die-ner (Get It?)	Patrick Horvath	2010		
Disease X: The Zombie Experiment	Nirmal Baby Varghese	2025	Indian film	
The Discarnates (Summer Among the Zombies, Ijintachi tono natsu)	Nobuhiko Obayashi	1988		
Do Gaz Zameen Ke Neeche (Two Yards Under the Ground)	Tulsi Ramsay	1972	First zombie movie from India	
Doc of the Dead	Alexandre O. Philippe	2014		
Doctor Blood's Coffin	Sidney J. Furie	1961	First color zombie film	
Doghouse	Jake West	2009		
Don't Go in the House	Joseph Ellison	1979		
Don't Grow Up	Thierry Poiraud	2015		
Doom	Andrzej Bartkowiak	2005	Based loosely on the 1994 video game	
Dorm of the Dead	Donald Farmer	2006		
Dr. Satán y la magia negra (Dr. Satan Versus Black Magic)	Rogelio A. González	1968		
The Driver	Wych Kaosayananda	2019		
Dylan Dog: Dead of Night	Kevin Munroe	2011		
E-Sarn Zombie	Tanawat Aiemjinda	2023		
The Earth Dies Screaming	Terence Fisher	1964		
Eat Me! (The Eaters)	Katie Carman	2009		
Ed and His Dead Mother	Jonathan Wacks	1993		
Edges of Darkness	Jason Horton & Blaine Cade	2008		
The End?	Daniele Misischia	2017		
Erotic Nights of the Living Dead (Sexy Nights of the Living Dead)	Joe D'Amato	1980		
Evil (To Κακό)	Yorgos Noussias	2005		
Ever After	Carolina Hellsgard	2018		
The Evil Dead	Sam Raimi	1981	Demonic possession	
Evil Head	Doug Sakmann	2012	Adult parody of The Evil Dead	
Evil: In the Time of Heroes (To Κακό 2: Στην Eποχή Tων Hρώων)	Yorgos Noussias	2009	Sequel to To Κακό	
Exhumed	Brian Clement	2003	Anthology film	
Exorcism at 60,000 Feet	Chad Ferrin	2019	Possession by demon	
Extinction	Miguel Angel Vivas	2015		
Fading of the Cries	Brian A. Metcalf	2008		
Feeding the Masses	Richard Griffin	2004		
Festival of the Living Dead	Jen Soska & Sylvia Soska	2024		
Fido	Andrew Currie	2006		
Flesheater (Zombie Nosh)	Bill Hinzman	1988		
Flick	David Howard	2008		
Flight of the Living Dead: Outbreak on a Plane	Scott Thomas	2007		
The Fog	John Carpenter	1980	Called ghosts in the film	
Forbidden Siren (Sairen)	Yukihiko Tsutsumi	2006	Live-action adaptation of Siren video game series	
Forest of the Dead	Brian Singleton	2007		
The Four Skulls of Jonathan Drake	Edward L. Cahn	1959		
Frankenhooker	Frank Henenlotter	1990		
Frankenstein Island	Jerry Warren	1981		
Frankenstein's Army	Richard Raaphorst	2013		
Freaks of Nature	Robbie Pickering	2015		
Friend of the World	Brian Patrick Butler	2020		
The Frozen Dead	Herbert J. Leder	1966	Nazi zombies	
Frozen Scream	Frank Roach	1980		
Gallowwalkers	Andrew Goth	2012		
Gangnam Zombie	Lee Soo-seong	2023		
Gangs of the Dead (Last Rites)	Duane Stinnett	2006		
Garden of the Dead	John Hayes	1972		
George: A Zombie Intervention	J.T. Seaton	2009		
Germ Z	J.T. Boone	2013	Infected humans	
The Ghost Breakers	George Marshall	1940		
Ghost Brigade (The Lost Brigade, Grey Knight)	George Hickenlooper	1993		
The Ghost Galleon	Amando de Ossorio	1974	Third film in de Ossorio's Blind Dead series	
The Ghouls (Cannibal Dead: The Ghouls, Urban Cannibals)	Chad Ferrin	2003		
The Girl with All the Gifts	Colm McCarthy	2016		
Go Goa Gone	Raj Nidimoru and Krishna D.K.	2013	Publicized as India's first "zom-com"	
Goal of the Dead	Thierry Poiraud and Benjamin Rocher	2014		
Gory Gory Hallelujah	Sue Corcoran	2003		
Grave Mistake	Shawn Darling	2008		
Grave Robbers	Rubén Galindo Jr.	1989		
Graveyard Alive: A Zombie Nurse in Love	Elza Kephart	2003		
The Guard Post	Kong Su-chang	2008		
Handling the Undead	Thea Hvistendahl	2024		
The Hanging Woman (Return of the Zombies)	José Luis Merino	1973		
Hard Rock Zombies	Krishna Shah	1985		
Hell of the Living Dead (Night of the Zombies)	Bruno Mattei	1980		
Hellgate	William A. Levey	1989		
Hemet, or the Landlady Don't Drink Tea	Tony Olmos	2023	Drug turns people into flesh-eating zombies	
Here Alone	Rod Blackhurst	2016		
The Hidan of Maukbeiangjow (Invasion of the Girl Snatchers, Kaspar and Prudence Laugh Till It Hurts at The Killers of the Zombie Plot: A Musical)	Lee Jones	1973	Aliens possess corpses	
Hide and Creep	Chuck Hartsell & Chance Shirley	2004		
High School Girl Rika: Zombie Hunter (Zombie Hunter Rika)	Ken'ichi Fujiwara	2009		
The Hive	David Yarovesky	2014		
Hood of the Living Dead	Eduardo Quiroz & Jose Quiroz	2005		
Hood of the Dead	Freeman White III	2026		
The Horde (La Horde)	Yannick Dahan & Benjamin Rocher	2009		
Horror Express (Pánico en el Transiberiano, Panic on the Trans-Siberian Express)	Eugenio Martín	1973		
The Horror of Party Beach	Del Tenney	1964		
Horror Rises from the Tomb	Carlos Aured	1972		
Horrors of War	Peter John Ross & John Whitney	2006		
The House by the Cemetery	Lucio Fulci	1981	Third film in The Gates of Hell trilogy	
House of the Damned	Sean Weathers	1996		
House of the Dead	Uwe Boll	2003		
House of the Dead 2	Michael Hurst	2005		
The House of Seven Corpses	Paul Harrison	1973		
How to Kill a Zombie	Tiffany McLean	2014		
Hsien of the Dead	Gary Ow	2012		
Humans vs Zombies	Brian T. Jaynes	2011		
Hysterical	Chris Bearde	1983		
I Am a Hero	Shinsuke Sato	2016		
I Am Legend	Francis Lawrence	2007	Infected humans. Third adaptation of the novel I Am Legend.	
I Am Omega	Griff Furst	2007	Mockbuster based on I Am Legend	
I Eat Your Skin (Zombies)	Del Tenney	1971		
I Sell the Dead	Glenn McQuaid	2008		
I Survived a Zombie Holocaust	Guy Pigden	2014		
I Walked with a Zombie	Jacques Tourneur	1943		
I Was a Teenage Zombie	John Elias Michalakis	1987		
I Was a Zombie for the F.B.I.	Marius Penczner	1982		
I, Zombie: The Chronicles of Pain (I, Zombie)	Andrew Parkinson	1999		
The Incredibly Strange Creatures Who Stopped Living and Became Mixed-Up Zombies	Ray Dennis Steckler	1964		
In un giorno la fine (The End?)	Daniele Misischia	2017		
IIZ: Indian Institute of Zombies	Alok Kumar Dwivedi, Gaganjeet Singh	2026		
Infected (The Dead Inside)	Andrew Gilbert	2013		
Inmate Zero (Patients of a Saint)	Russell Owen	2020		
Insanitarium	Jeff Buhler	2008		
Invisible Invaders	Edward L. Cahn	1959	Aliens possess corpses	
Island: Wedding of the Zombies (Ada: Zombilerin Düğünü, The Zombie Wedding)	Murat Emir Eren, Talip Ertürk	2010		
Isle of the Snake People (La muerte viviente)	Juan Ibáñez	1971		
It Stains the Sands Red	Colin Minihan	2016		
J'accuse	Abel Gance	1919	World War I zombies	
JeruZalem	Doron Paz and Yoav Paz	2015		
Jombieland	Deepak Thaper	2025	Punjab's first Zombie film.	
Juan of the Dead (Juan de los Muertos)	Alejandro Brugués	2010	First zombie movie from Cuba	
Junk (Shiryo-gari)	Atsushi Muroga	2000		
Kampung Zombie (Zombie Village)	Billy Christian	2015	Publicised as Indonesia's first zombie film	
Kartoffelsalat – Nicht fragen!	Michael David Pate	2015	The cast mainly consists of famous German YouTube personalities	
Killing Spree	Tim Ritter	1987		
King of the Zombies	Jean Yarbrough	1941		
Kingdom: Ashin of the North	Kim Seong-hun	2021		
Kiss Daddy Goodbye (Revenge of the Zombie)	Patrick Regan	1981		
KL Zombi	Woo Ming Jin	2011		
Krachak Krien (Zombie Fighters)	Poj Arnon	2017		
Kung Fu From Beyond the Grave	Chiu Lee	1982		
Kung Fu Zombie (Wu long tian shi zhao ji gui)	Hwa I Hung	1981		
Kuolleiden talvi (Winter of the Dead)	Markus Heiskanen	2005	Finnish short film	
L.A. Zombie (Gay of the Dead)	Bruce LaBruce	2010	Adult film	
Land of the Dead	George A. Romero	2005	Third sequel to Night of the Living Dead	
The Last Days on Mars	Ruairí Robinson	2013		
The Last Man on Earth (L'ultimo uomo della Terra)	Ubaldo Ragona	1964	Infected humans. First adaptation of the novel I Am Legend.	
Last of the Living	Logan McMillan	2009		
The Legend of the 7 Golden Vampires	Roy Ward Baker	1974		
Legion of the Night	Matt Jaissle	1995		
Let Sleeping Corpses Lie	Jorge Grau	1974		
Life After Beth	Jeff Baena	2014		
Lisik: Origin Point	John Renz Cahilig	2025		
A Little Bit Zombie	Casey Walker	2012		
Little Monsters	Abe Forsythe	2019		
Livelihood	Ryan Graham	2005		
Machine Head	Michael Patrick, Leonard Murphy	2000		
The Mad	John Kalangis	2007		
Maggie	Henry Hobson	2015		
Make-out with Violence	Deagol Brothers	2008		
Maniac	Dwain Esper	1934		
Maniac Cop	William Lustig	1988		
Maniac Cop 2	William Lustig	1990		
Maniac Cop 3	William Lustig	1992		
Mansion of the Living Dead	Jesús Franco	1982		
Meat Market	Brian Clement	2000		
Meat Market 2	Brian Clement	2001		
Messiah of Evil	Willard Huyck & Gloria Katz	1972		
Miruthan (Zombie)	Shakti Soundar Rajan	2016	Promoted as first Indian Tamil zombie film	
Miss Zombie	Sabu	2013		
Las momias de Guanajuato (The Mummies of Guanajuato)	Federico Curiel	1972		
Monster Brawl	Jesse Thomas Cook	2011		
Monster High	Rudy Poe	1989		
Monstrosity (The Atomic Brain)	Joseph Mascelli	1963	Shown on MST3K as The Atomic Brain	
La Morte Vivante (The Living Dead Girl)	Jean Rollin	1982		
Mortuary	Tobe Hooper	2005		
Mulberry Street	Jim Mickle	2006		
El mundo del los muertos (The World of the Dead)	Gilberto Martínez Solares	1970		
Mutant	John Cardos	1984		
Mutants	David Morlet	2009		
My Boyfriend's Back	Bob Balaban	1993		
My Zombabe	Bobby Bonifacio Jr.	2024		
Die Nacht der lebenden Loser (Night of the Living Dorks)	Mathias Dinter	2004		
Navy Seals vs Zombies	Stanton Barrett	2015		
Necropolis Awakened	Garrett White	2002		
Netherworld	David Schmoeller	1992		
The Night Eats the World	Dominique Rocher	2018		
Night Life	David Acomba	1989		
Night of the Comet	Thom Eberhardt	1984		
Night of the Creeps	Fred Dekker	1986		
Night of the Day of the Dawn of the Son of the Bride of the Return of the Revenge of the Terror of the Attack of the Evil, Mutant, Alien, Flesh Eating, Hellbound, Zombified Living Dead Part 2: In Shocking 2-D	James Riffel	1991		
Night of the Dead (Night of the Leben Tod)	Eric Forsberg	2006		
Night of the Living Dead	George A. Romero	1968	First film to depict zombies as reanimated cannibalistic cadavers	
Night of the Living Dead	Tom Savini	1990	Remake	
Night of the Living Dead	Chad Zuver	2014	Remake	
Night of the Living Dead 3D (Night of the Living DE3D)	Jeff Broadstreet	2006		
Night of the Living Dead 3D: Re-Animation	Jeff Broadstreet	2012	Prequel to Night of the Living Dead 3D	
Night of the Living Dead: Darkest Dawn	Zebediah de Soto	2015		
Night of the Living Dead: Reanimated	Mike Schneider	2009		
Night of the Living Dead: Resurrection	James Plumb	2012		
Night of the Living Deb	Kyle Rankin	2015		
Night of the Seagulls	Amando de Ossorio	1975	Fourth film in de Ossorio's Blind Dead series	
The Night Shift	Thomas Smith	2011	Based on a 2009 short film of the same title	
Nightmare City (City of the Walking Dead)	Umberto Lenzi	1980		
Ninja Zombies	Noah Cooper	2011		
Ninjas vs. Zombies	Justin Timpane	2008		
Nixon and Hogan Smoke Christmas	Kevin Strange	2010		
Nudist Colony of the Dead	Mark Pirro	1991		
Oasis of the Zombies	Jesús Franco	1982	French-Spanish co-production	
The Odd Family: Zombie on Sale	Lee Min-jae	2019		
Office Uprising	Lin Oeding	2018		
Oh! My Zombie Mermaid (Â! Ikkenya puroresu)	Naoki Kubo	2004	Mermaid is not a zombie, but it has a zombie character	
Ojuju	C.J. Obasi	2014		
One Cut of the Dead	Shinichiro Ueda	2017		
One Dark Night	Tom McLoughlin	1983		
Open Grave	Gonzalo López-Gallego	2013		
Ouanga	George Terwillger	1936		
Outbreak	Jeff Wolfe	2024		
Outpost	Steve Barker	2008		
Outpost: Black Sun	Steve Barker	2012		
Outpost: Rise of the Spetsnaz	Kieran Parker	2013		
Outside	Carlo Ledesma	2024		
Overlord	Julius Avery	2018		
Ozone	J. R. Bookwalter	1995	Drug turns people into zombies	
Pandemia C19	Mitchel Ramos Lomparte	2022		
Pandemic	John Suits	2016		
Parade of the Dead	Richard Coburn	2010	Australia; soundtrack by Adelaide band Hilltop Hoods	
ParaNorman	Sam Fell & Chris Butler	2012	Described as a "zombie movie for kids"	
Pathogen	Emily Hagins	2006	The documentary Zombie Girl: The Movie covers the making of this film.	
Patient Zero	Stefan Ruzowitzky	2018		
Peninsula	Yeon Sang-ho	2020	Followup to Train to Busan, set in the same Universe	
Pet Sematary	Mary Lambert	1989		
Pet Sematary	Kevin Kölsch & Dennis Widmyer	2019		
Pet Sematary Two	Mary Lambert	1992		
Phi Ha Ayodhaya (The Black Death)	Chalermchatri Yukol	2015		
Pigeons from Hell	John Newland	1961	Adaptation of the short story by Robert E. Howard, for Boris Karloff's TV series Thriller	
Pirates of the Caribbean: On Stranger Tides	Rob Marshall	2011		
Plaga Zombie	Pablo Parés & Hernán Sáez	1997	First zombie movie from Argentina and part of the Plaga Zombie film series	
Plaga Zombie: Zona Mutante	Pablo Parés & Hernán Sáez	2001		
The Plague (Clive Barker's The Plague)	Hal Masonberg	2006		
The Plague of the Zombies	John Gilling	1966		
Plaguers	Brad Sykes	2008	Alien orb turns people into zombies	
Plan 9 from Outer Space	Ed Wood	1959		
Planet Terror	Robert Rodriguez	2007		
Pontypool	Bruce McDonald	2008	Linguistic virus turns people into infected zombies	
Pop Punk Zombies	Steve Dayton	2011		
Portrait of a Zombie	Bing Bailey	2012		
Poultrygeist: Night of the Chicken Dead	Lloyd Kaufman	2006		
Premutos: The Fallen Angel (Premutos – Der gefallene Engel, a.k.a. Premutos: Lord of the Living Dead)	Olaf Ittenbach	1997		
Pride and Prejudice and Zombies	Burr Steers	2016		
Prince of Darkness (John Carpenter's Prince of Darkness)	John Carpenter	1987		
Pro Wrestlers vs Zombies	Cody Knotts	2014		
Project Z	Henrik Martin Dahlsbakken	2021		
Pushin' Up Daisies	Patrick Franklin	2010		
Quarantine	John Erick Dowdle	2008	Remake of REC	
Quarantine 2: Terminal	John Pogue	2011		
Queens of the Dead	Tina Romero	2025	United States;	
The Quick and the Undead	Gerald Nott	2006		
Rabid	David Cronenberg	1977		
Rabid	Jen Soska, Sylvia Soska	2019	Remake of Rabid	
Raiders of the Living Dead	Samuel M. Sherman	1986		
Les Raisins de la Mort (The Grapes of Death, Pesticide)	Jean Rollin	1978		
Rammbock	Marvin Kren	2010		
Rampant	Kim Sung-hoon	2018		
Range 15	Ross Patterson	2016		
Ravenous (Les Affamés)	Robin Aubert	2017		
Raw Force	Edward D. Murphy	1982		
Re-Animator	Stuart Gordon	1985		
REC	Jaume Balagueró & Paco Plaza	2007		
REC 2	Jaume Balagueró & Paco Plaza	2009	Sequel to REC	
REC 3: Genesis	Paco Plaza	2012	Parallel stories to REC	
REC 4: Apocalypse	Jaume Balagueró	2014	Parallel stories to REC	
Redcon-1	Cheung Chee Keong	2018		
Redneck Zombies	Pericles Lewnes	1987		
Reel Zombies	David J. Francis	2008	Third installment in Zombie Night series, mockumentary	
Reichsführer SS	David B. Stewart	2014		
Remains (Steve Niles' Remains)	Colin Theys	2011		
Remington and the Curse of the Zombadings (Zombadings 1: Patayin sa Shokot si Remington)	Jade Castro	2011		
Resident Evil	Paul W. S. Anderson	2002	First film in the Resident Evil series	
Resident Evil: Afterlife	Paul W. S. Anderson	2010		
Resident Evil: Apocalypse	Alexander Witt	2004		
Resident Evil: Damnation	Makoto Kamiya	2012	Animated	
Resident Evil: Degeneration (Biohazard: Degeneration)	Makoto Kamiya	2008	Animated	
Resident Evil: Extinction	Russell Mulcahy	2007		
Resident Evil: The Final Chapter	Paul W. S. Anderson	2016		
Resident Evil: Retribution	Paul W. S. Anderson	2012		
Resident Evil: Vendetta	Takanori Tsujimoto	2017	Animated	
Resident Evil: Welcome to Raccoon City	Johannes Roberts	2021	Reboot	
Resident Evil (2026 film)	Zach Cregger	2026	Reboot	
Return of the Blind Dead	Amando de Ossorio	1973	Second film in de Ossorio's Blind Dead series	
The Return of the Living Dead	Dan O'Bannon	1985		
Return of the Living Dead Part II	Ken Wiederhorn	1988		
Return of the Living Dead 3	Brian Yuzna	1993		
Return of the Living Dead: Necropolis	Ellory Elkayem	2005		
Return of the Living Dead: Rave to the Grave	Ellory Elkayem	2005		
The Returned	Manuel Carballo	2013		
The Revenant	D. Kerry Prior	2009	Combination of zombie and vampire	
Revenge of the Living Dead Girls	Pierre B. Reinhard	1987		
Revenge of the Zombies	Steve Sekely	1943		
Revolt of the Zombies	Victor Halperin	1936		
The Rezort	Steve Barker	2015		
Rise of the Zombies	Nick Lyon	2012		
Ritual (Tales from the Crypt: Ritual)	Avi Nesher	2002		
The Roost	Ti West	2005		
Route 666	William Wesley	2001		
Run!	Oudom Touch	2013	Publicised as first Cambodian zombie film	
Santo el enmascarado de plata y Blue Demon contra los monstruos (Santo and Blue Demon vs. the Monsters)	Gilberto Martínez Solares	1970		
Santo vs. the Zombies (Santo Contra los Zombies, Invasion of the Zombies)	Benito Alazraki	1961		
SARS Wars	Taweewat Wantha	2004		
Satan's Slave	Sisworo Gautama Putra	1980		
Savageland	Phil Guidry, Simon Herbert, David Whelan	2015	Found footage	
Scarecrows	William Wesley	1988		
Scary or Die	Bob Badway, Michael Emanuel, Igor Meglic	2012	Anthology film; "The Crossing" and "Lover Come Back" segments	
Scooby-Doo on Zombie Island	Hiroshi Aoyama & Kazumi Fukushima	1998		
School-Live!	Issei Shibata	2019		
Schoolgirl Apocalypse	John S. Cairns	2011		
Scouts Guide to the Zombie Apocalypse	Christopher B. Landon	2015		
Seoul Station	Yeon Sang-ho	2016		
The Serpent and the Rainbow	Wes Craven	1988		
Severed: Forest of the Dead	Carl Bessai	2005	Not to be confused with Forest of the Dead	
Sexykiller (Sexykiller, morirás por ella)	Paco Cabeza	2008		
Shadow: Dead Riot	Derek Wan	2006		
Shake, Rattle & Roll Extreme	Joey de Guzman (segment "Rage")	2023	Anthology film	
Shaolin vs. Evil Dead (Shao lin jiang shi, Siu lam geung see)	Douglas Kung	2004		
Shark Island	Misty Talley	2015	Experimental zombie shark	
Shatter Dead	Scooter McCrae	1994		
Shaun of the Dead	Edgar Wright	2004	Described as the first "Rom-Zom-Com"	
Shed of the Dead	Drew Cullingham	2019		
Shock Waves	Ken Wiederhorn	1977		
Sick: Survive the Night	Ryan M. Andrews	2012		
Silent Night, Zombie Night	Sean Cain	2009		
Apokawixa	Xawery Żuławski	2022	First Polish zombie film	
Silent Zone	Peter Deak	2025	Hungarian Zombie film	
Sint (Saint, Saint Nick)	Dick Maas	2010		
The Sky Has Fallen	Doug Roos	2009		
Slither	James Gunn	2006		
Sorgenfri (What We Become)	Bo Mikkelson	2015		
Special Dead	Thomas L. Phillips and Sean Simmons	2006		
Splinter	Toby Wilkins	2008	Humans infected by splinters	
Spring Break Zombie Massacre	Bobby Carnevale	2016	Brothers must use their powers to stop Satan and his zombie minions from ruining their spring break	
Stacy (Stacy: Attack of the Schoolgirl Zombies)	Naoyuki Tomomatsu	2001		
Stag Night of the Dead	Neil Jones	2010		
Stalled	Christian James	2013		
State of Emergency	Turner Clay	2011		
The Stink of Flesh	Scott Phillips	2005		
The Stuff	Larry Cohen	1985		
Sugar Hill	Paul Maslansky	1974		
The Supernaturals	Armand Mastroianni	1986		
Surf II	Randall Badat	1984	Drink turns people into zombies	
Survival of the Dead	George A. Romero	2009	Fifth sequel to Night of the Living Dead	
Swamp Zombies	Len Kabasinski	2005		
Tales of Terror	Roger Corman	1962		
Teenage Exorcist	Grant Austin Waldman	1991		
Teenage Zombies	Jerry Warren	1959		
Terror-Creatures from the Grave (5 tombe per un medium, Cemetery of the Living Dead)	Massimo Pupillo	1965		
The Terror Experiment	George Mendeluk	2010		
They Came Back	Robin Campillo	2004		
They Walk	Charles House II	2010		
This is What Remains (Dead Within)	Ben Wagner	2014		
Tokyo Zombie	Sakichi Satō	2005		
Tombs of the Blind Dead	Amando de Ossorio	1972	First film in de Ossorio's Blind Dead series	
Tormented	Jon Wright	2009		
Toxic Zombies	Charles McCrann	1980		
Trailer Park of Terror	Steven Goldmann	2008		
Train to Busan	Yeon Sang-ho	2016		
Trancers	Charles Band	1985	Science fiction film where the villain has mind-controlled zombie henchmen	
Trip Ubusan: The Lolas vs. Zombies	Mark A. Reyes	2017		
Trizombie	Bob Colaers	2024		
Udham Patakh	Abu Aleeha	2021	Pakistani film	
Uncle Sam	William Lustig	1996		
Undead	Michael Spierig & Peter Spierig	2003		
Undead or Alive	Glasgow Phillips	2007		
Undead Pool (Attack Girls' Swim Team versus the Undead)	Kôji Kawano	2007		
Uniform SurviGirl I (Seifuku Survivor Girl, Seifuku sabaigâru I)	Hiroshi Kaneko	2008		
Urban Decay	Harry Basil	2007		
Valley of the Dead	Javier Ruiz Caldera	2020		
V/H/S	Adam Wingard (one segment only)	2012	Anthology film; segment Tape 56/frame narrative	
V/H/S/2	Eduardo Sánchez & Gregg Hale (one segment only)	2013	Anthology film; segment A Ride in the Park	
Valley of the Zombies	Philip Ford	1946		
Vampires vs. Zombies (Carmilla the Lesbian Vampire)	Vince D'Amato	2004		
Vengeance of the Zombies (La rebelión de las muertas)	León Klimovsky	1973		
Vere Vazhi Ille (No Other Way)	M.S. Prem Nath	2015	Promoted as first Malaysian Tamil language zombie film	
Versus (Vāsasu)	Ryuhei Kitamura	2000		
The Video Dead	Robert Scott	1987		
The Vineyard	James Hong	1989		
Violent Shit III: Infantry of Doom (Zombie Doom)	Andreas Schnaas	1999		
A Virgin Among the Living Dead	Jesús Franco	1973	Main character has visions of zombies	
Virus Undead	Wolf Wolff and Ohmuti	2008		
Voodoo	Rene Eram	1995	Voodoo cult	
Voodoo Dawn	Steven Fierberg	1990		
Voodoo Island	Reginald LeBorg	1957		
Voodoo Man	William Beaudine	1944		
The Wailing	Na Hong-jin	2016	Ambiguous toxin/evil possessed living and dead	
The Walking Deceased	Scott Dow	2015	Parody of Warm Bodies and AMC's The Walking Dead	
War of the Dead (Stone's War)	Marko Makilaakso	2011		
War of the Zombies (Rome Against Rome)	Giuseppe Vari	1964		
Warm Bodies	Jonathan Levine	2013	United States; Zombie romance inspired by Romeo and Juliet	
Warning Sign	Hal Barwood	1985		
Wasting Away (Aaah! Zombies!!)	Matthew Kohnen	2007		
Waxwork	Anthony Hickox	1988		
Waxwork II: Lost in Time	Anthony Hickox	1992		
We Are Zombies	RKSS	2023		
We Bury the Dead	Zak Hilditch	2025		
Weekend at Bernie's II	Robert Klane	1993		
We're Going to Eat You	Tsui Hark	1980		
White Zombie	Victor Halperin	1932	Believed to be the earliest zombie film	
Wicked Little Things	J.S. Cardone	2006		
Wilczyca (The Wolf, She-Wolf)	Marek Piestrak	1983	Dead woman comes back as an undead werewolf	
Wild Zero	Tetsuro Takeuchi	2000		
The Woman Eater (Womaneater)	Charles Saunders	1958		
World War Z	Marc Forster	2013	United States; Virus causes humans to turn into zombies.	
Wyrmwood: Road of the Dead	Kiah Roache-Turner	2014		
Yoroi Samurai Zombie (Yoroi: Samurai Zonbie, Samurai Zombie)	Tak Sakaguchi	2008		
Yummy	Lars Damoiseaux	2019		
Z-Mom	Kou Darachan	2024	Cambodian Zombie	
Zeder (Revenge of the Dead)	Pupi Avati	1983		
Zeta: When The Dead Awaken	Amanda Iswan	2019		
Zibahkhana (Hell's Ground)	Omar Khan	2007	First zombie movie from Pakistan	
ZMD: Zombies of Mass Destruction	Kevin Hamedani	2009		
Zom 100: Bucket List of the Dead	Yûsuke Ishida	2023		
Zombeid	Nabeel Qureshi	2026		
Zombeavers	Jordan Rubin	2014		
Zombi 2 (Zombie, Zombie Flesh Eaters)	Lucio Fulci	1979	An unlicensed sequel to Zombi (the Italian title of Dawn of the Dead)	
Zombi 3 (Zombie Flesh Eaters 2)	Lucio Fulci & Bruno Mattei	1988		
Zombi Child	Bertrand Bonello	2019		
Zombi Kampung Pisang (Zombies from Banana Village)	Mamat Khalid	2007		
Zombibi (Kill Zombie or Zombie Kill)	Martijn Smits & Erwin van den Eshof	2012	Dutch splatter comedy zombie movie	
Zombie	Bhuvan R Nullan	2019		
Zombie 108 (Z-108 qi cheng, Call of the Undead)	Joe Chien	2012	First zombie movie from Taiwan	
Zombie 4: After Death (Oltre la morte, Zombie Flesh Eaters 3)	Claudio Fragasso	1988		
Zombie 5: Killing Birds (Uccelli assassini, Killing Birds: Raptors)	Claudio Lattanzi	1988		
Zombie Apocalypse	Nick Lyon	2011		
Zombie Apocalypse in Apartment 14F	Gilbert Allan	2019		
Zombie Ass (Zombie Ass: Toilet of the Dead)	Noboru Iguchi	2011		
Zombie Bloodbath	Todd Sheets	1993		
Zombie Brigade	Carmelo Musca & Barrie Pattison	1988		
Zombie Chronicles	Brad Sykes	2001		
Zombie Day Apocalypse	Cameron C. Romero	2017	Zombies take over during shooting of zombie film	
The Zombie Diaries	Michael Bartlett & Kevin Gates	2006		
The Zombie Diaries 2	Michael Bartlett & Kevin Gates	2011	Sequel	
The Zombie Farm	Ricardo Islas	2011		
Zombie Fight Club	Joe Chien	2014		
Zombie High	Ron Link	1987		
Zombie Holocaust (Zombi Holocaust)	Marino Girolami	1980		
Zombie Holocaust (Female Mercenaries on Zombie Island)	Gary Whitson	1995		
Zombie Honeymoon	David Gebroe	2004		
Zombie Hunter	Kevin King	2013		
The Zombie King	Aidan Belizaire	2013		
Zombie King and the Legion of Doom (Zombie Beach Party, Enter ... Zombie King)	Stacey Case	2003		
Zombie Lake	Jean Rollin	1981		
Zombie Massacre	Luca Boni and Marco Ristori	2013		
Zombie Nation	Ulli Lommel	2004		
Zombie Night	David J. Francis	2003		
Zombie Night	John Gulager	2013		
Zombie Night 2: Awakening	David J. Francis	2006	Sequel to the 2003 film	
Zombie Nightmare	Jack Bravman	1987		
Zombie Plane	Lav Bodnaruk and Michael Mier	TBD		
Zombie Planet	George Bonilla	2004		
Zombie Reddy	Prasanth Varma	2021	Promoted as first zombie film in Telugu language	
Zombie Self-Defense Force (Zonbi jieitai)	Naoyuki Tomomatsu	2006		
Zombie Strippers	Jay Lee	2008		
Zombie Tidal Wave	Anthony C. Ferrante	2019		
Zombie Town	Peter Lepeniotis	2023		
Zombie Undead	Rhys Davies	2010		
Zombie! vs. Mardi Gras	Will Frank & Karl DeMolay	1999		
Zombie Wars	David A. Prior	2007		
Zombie Women of Satan	Steve O'Brien and Warren Speed	2009		
Zombiegeddon	Chris Watson	2003		
Zombieland	Ruben Fleischer	2009		
Zombieland: Double Tap	Ruben Fleischer	2019		
Zombiepura	Jacen Tan	2018	Promoted as first Singaporean zombie film	
Zombies	Hamid Torabpour	2016		
Zombies (Z-O-M-B-I-E-S)	Paul Hoen	2018	Disney Channel movie	
Zombies 2 (Z-O-M-B-I-E-S 2)	Paul Hoen	2020	Disney Channel movie	
Zombies 3 (Z-O-M-B-I-E-S 3)	Paul Hoen	2022	Disney Channel movie	
Zombies Anonymous (Last Rites of the Dead)	Marc Fratto	2006		
Zombies of Mora Tau	Edward L. Cahn	1957		
Zombies on Broadway (Loonies on Broadway)	Gordon Dines & Gordon M. Douglas	1945		
Zombies! Zombies! Zombies!	Jason M. Murphy	2008		
Zombivli	Aditya Sarpotdar	2022		
Mangue Negro	Rodrigo Aragão	2008	First Released Zombie movie from Brasil	https://www.imdb.com/title/tt1329396/
The Zombinator	Sergio Myers	2012		
Zombiology: Enjoy Yourself Tonight	Alan Lo Wai-lun	2017		
Zone of the Dead (Зона мртвих, Zona Mrtvih, Apocalypse of the Dead)	Milan Konjević & Milan Todorović	2009		
Zoombies	Glenn R. Miller	2016		
Zoombies 2	Glenn R. Miller	2019	Prequel to Zoombies	

== See also ==
- List of apocalyptic and post-apocalyptic fiction
- List of zombie video games
- List of zombie novels
- List of zombie short films and undead-related projects
- List of vampire films
- List of zombie Nazi films
- Zombie comedy
