= Zombie Night =

Zombie Night may refer to:

- Zombie Night (2003 film), a zombie film by David J. Francis
- Zombie Night (2013 film), a zombie film by John Gulager

== See also ==
- Zombie Night 2: Awakening
- Silent Night, Zombie Night
