= DOTD =

"DOTD" may refer to:

- Deal of the day
- Louisiana Department of Transportation and Development

In popular culture, "DOTD" may refer to:

- Dawn of the Dead (disambiguation)
- Dawn of the Dragons (book)
- Dawn of the Dragons (video game)
- Destiny of the Daleks
- Dinner of the day
- Day of the Dead
- Donkey of the Day, segment on The Breakfast Club (radio show)
- Driver of the day, used in Formula 1
