= Beast of Blood =

Beast of Blood may refer to:

- Beast of Blood (film), a 1970 Filipino horror film
- "Beast of Blood" (song), a 2001 release by Malice Mizer

== See also ==
- Blood of the Beasts, a 1949 French documentary
- Blood of the Beast, a 2003 American film
- Blood Beast (2007), the fifth book in Darren Shan's The Demonata series
