= April Scott (disambiguation) =

April Scott is an actress.

April Scott may also refer to:

- April Scott (Home and Away)
- April Scott, character in The Dead Outside
