= Exhumed =

Exhumed may refer to:

- Exhumation, the digging up of a buried corpse
- Exhumation (geology), a rock movement process
- Exhumed (band), an American deathgrind band
- Exhumed (film), a 2003 Canadian horror anthology film
- Exhumed (video game), a 1996 first-person shooter
- Exhumed Films, an American film organization
- Exhumed river channel, a ridge of sandstone
