= George Terwilliger =

American film director

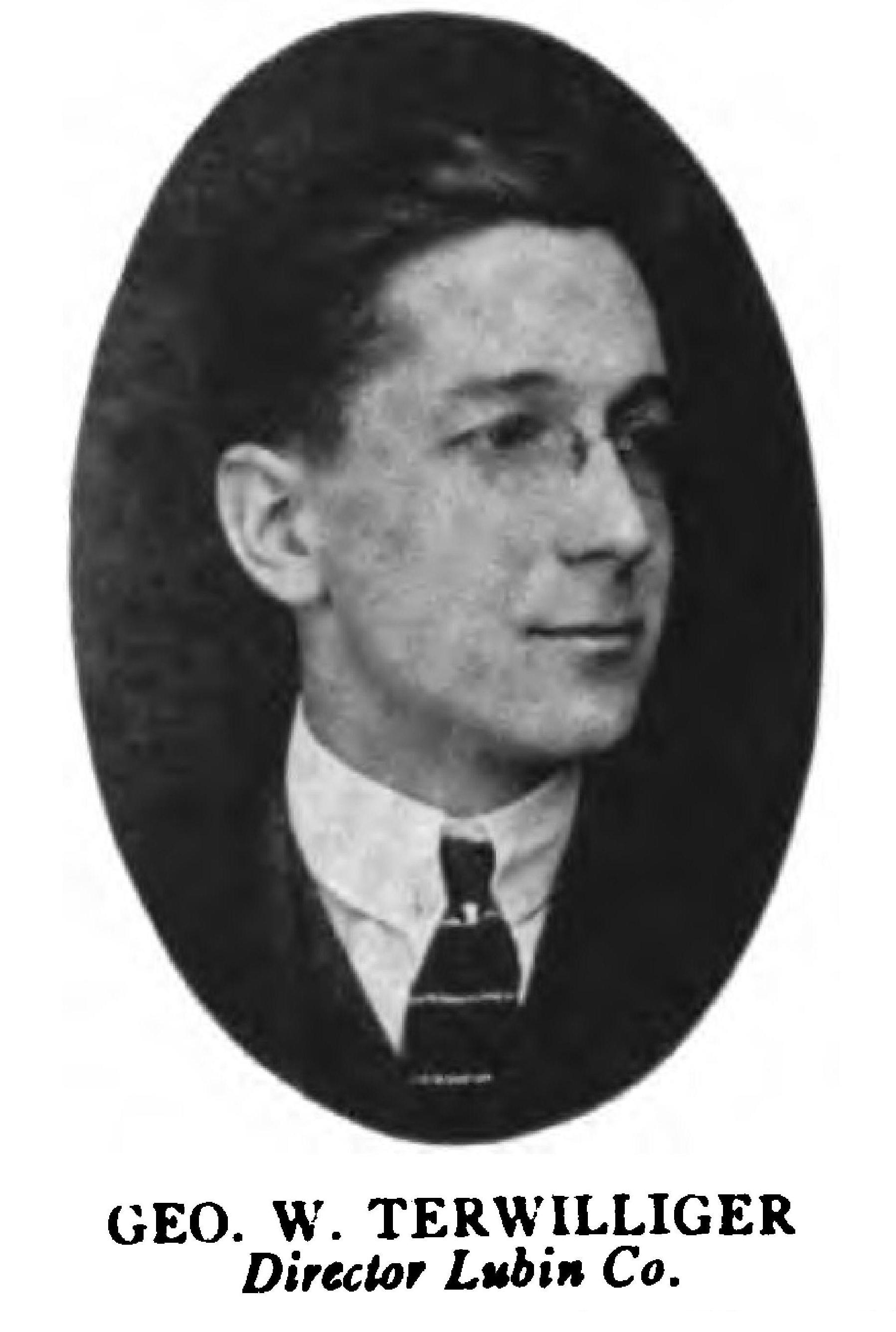
- Born: George Walter Terwilliger; February 27, 1882; New York City; United States
- Died: December 12, 1970 (aged 88); Hialeah, Florida; United States
- Occupations: Film director; screenwriter; journalist
- Years active: 1902-1940s
- Spouses: Hazel Belle Hubbard (m. 1909-1956; her death)
- Children: George Terwilliger, Jr. (1924-1983)

George Walter Terwilliger (February 27, 1882 – December 12, 1970) was an American film director, screenwriter, and journalist. He worked in both the silent and sound eras, directing at least 76 productions between 1912 and 1936. He also wrote scores of screenplays for films released between 1910 and 1939. In 1912 alone, he was contracted by Lubin film studio to write one story a week for the company.

== Early life and journalism ==
Born in Manhattan in 1882, George Terwilliger was the middle child of three children of James G. and Catherine A. (née Graves) Terwilliger. By 1900 his father, who worked as a clerk for the Central Railroad of New Jersey, had moved the family to the township of Linden in that state. Young George received a relatively modest education, completing just two years of high school before quitting to find a job and a career. (Note: In both the federal census of 1930 and 1940, the highest education attained by George Terwilliger is recorded as "H2”, which is enumeration coding for completion of two years of high school or the 10th grade.) He was still living at his parents' home in New Jersey in 1900, but he soon returned to Manhattan, where he was hired by The New York Dramatic Mirror to work as an editor and writer. The Mirror, a weekly, provided some traditional news reports but focused on covering the world of theatre, reviewing stage acts, and Broadway plays. The newspaper in the first years of the twentieth century only allotted occasional coverage to the emerging industry of motion pictures, a relatively small patch of entertainment that The Mirror and many others in the New York media regarded then as a passing oddity, a "queer freak", that did not warrant considerable print.

Around 1910, Terwilliger left The Mirror after working there for nine years to accept a job at The Morning Telegraph, another long-established New York weekly newspaper. The Telegraph contained general news and financial reports, although it specialized in theatrical coverage and horse-racing. Early on, it established too a department at the paper devoted specifically to covering motion pictures. Terwilliger spent only a year with The Telegraph, but during that time he significantly expanded its film department's staff and operations. He also wrote reviews and film-related features under the pen name "Gordon Trent". To supplement his limited income as an employee of newspapers published just once a week, Terwilliger wrote and edited stories, and sold "scenarios" to Biograph Studios in the Bronx such as The Lucky Toothache in 1910 and The Battle, directed by D. W. Griffith and released in 1911. (Note: Many of the staff screenwriters or "scenarists" for early film companies, such as George Terwilliger, Lawrence McCloskey, and William Henderson had previously worked as reporters or reviewers for newspapers and entertainment publications.)

== Selected filmography ==
Terwilliger served as both screenwriter and director on many film projects during his long career and as a cast member in a few productions. The following is just a partial list of his films.

- The Lucky Toothache (1910)
- The Clod (1913)
- The Daughters of Men (1914)
- The Gamblers (1914)
- The Nation's Peril (1915)
- The Ringtailed Rhinoceros (1915)
- The City of Failing Light (1916)
- The Last Shot (1916)
- Race Suicide (1916)
- The Lash of Destiny (1916)
- Her Good Name (1917)
- The Price Woman Pays (1919)
- Tom's Little Star (1919)
- Dollars and the Woman (1920)
- Slaves of Pride (1920)
- The Sporting Duchess (1920)
- The Fatal Hour (1920)
- The Misleading Lady (1920)
- Bride's Play (1922)
- What Fools Men Are (1922)
- Children of Dust (1923)
- Wife in Name Only (1923)
- Daughters Who Pay (1925)
- Married? (1925)
- The Big Show (1926)
- The Highbinders (1926)
- After the Fog (1929)
- Sentinel Light (Star) (1929), serial
- Ouanga (1936)
- The Devil's Daughter (1939)
- Poncomania (1940)
