= The Catcher =

- DVD released by Commercial Factors
- Directed by: Guy Crawford; Yvette Hoffman
- Written by: Guy Crawford; Yvette Hoffman
- Produced by: Guy Crawford; Yvette Hoffman
- Starring: Joe Estevez; David Heavener; Monique Parent
- Cinematography: Paul DeGruccio
- Edited by: Steven D. White
- Music by: Paul Amorosi
- Production company: C.C.M. Inc.
- Distributed by: Spectrum Films
- Release date: 1998 (United States)
- Running time: 77 minutes
- Country: United States
- Language: English

The Catcher is a 1998 American slasher film directed by Guy Crawford and Yvette Hoffman.

== Plot ==
Sick of his baseball-obsessed father Frank's abuse, a boy beats him to death with a bat while practicing in 1981. In 1998, catcher David J. Walker of the Devils is kicked out of a baseball game attended by scouts and is blamed when the Devils lose. That day, his girlfriend leaves, tired of him putting his love of baseball before her, and he is informed by Coach Foster that his contract will not be renewed.

Elsewhere, in a stadium locker room, Tyrone Jackson of The Wombats, who had just scored a major contract, is bludgeoned by someone wearing a catcher's uniform. Tyrone's assailant deletes David's file from the Devils' computer system, which they infect with a virus. The catcher's next victim is Devils player and assistant coach Terry's fiancé Billy. He is taped to a table and sodomized with a baseball bat. Out on the field, one of the commentators notices the catcher taking swings at non-existent balls, drilled by visions of Frank, who calls the catcher "Johnny". When the announcer investigates, he is incapacitated, tied to home plate and killed when Johnny runs the bases, kicking him in the head as he slides into home.

In her office, Terry notices that her computer has made a list (everyone killed by Johnny so far) and that it is typing out more names on its own. David drops by to deal with paperwork related to his dismissal, but since the computer system is down and the antivirus program will take a while to fix it, he and Terry go to a lunchroom being cleaned by the janitor, Carl. David's erratic behavior makes Terry storm back to her office, where the computer still refuses to work. Carl barges in and leads Terry and David to a large amount of blood he has found. David takes off, so Terry has Carl pursue him, but the custodian loses the ex-catcher and returns to Terry.

At the batting cages, Coach Foster is strung up and shot to death with a pitching machine. Johnny then goes to the field and finds Devils player Anthony making out with a woman. He snaps Anthony's neck and chases the girlfriend, stuffing her into a washing machine after he corners her in a laundry room.

Meanwhile, Carl tells Terry today is the anniversary of the day Johnny McIntosh (the boy from the intro) bludgeoned his father, and that when Johnny was arrested he swore he would return. Terry dismisses this story until the two find Billy's body. They look for David and finds him in a batting cage with Coach Foster's corpse. They are convinced David is the killer and try to escape through the front gate, but David catches them and knocks Carl out, taking his keys and chasing Terry. They encounter Johnny, who kills Carl.

Terry and David flee, but Johnny catches them, knocks them unconscious and places them on the field, now decorated with the bodies of all the male victims. A bat-wielding Johnny enters the field (which he hallucinates is full of spectators and players) and goes to home base, where David is bound and dressed like a catcher. Johnny forces Terry to be his pitcher, hits the third ball she throws and drags her along as he runs the bases, distracting himself and allowing David to escape his bonds. David and Johnny (who are dressed identically) fight. Terry stabs one of them with a splintered bat, realizing too late it was David. As Johnny strangles Terry, she is saved by Anthony's girlfriend and together they bash Johnny's head in.

== Cast ==
- David Heavener as David J. Walker
- Monique Parent as Terry Mitchell
- Joe Estevez as Frank McIntosh
- Sean J. Dillingham as Carl
- Leslie Garret as Beth
- Paul Moncrief as Billy Taylor
- James Patterson as Coach Red Foster
- Harley Harkins as Anthony
- Jeff Sorenson as Wayne Futzner
- Mike Kepple as Howie
- Fred Meyers as Young Johnny McIntosh
- Wendy Crawford as Phyllis McIntosh
- Nick Moore as Tyrone Jackson
- Denice Ramage as Linda
- Stephen T. Vanderbeck as Frost
- Jared Zobel as Paperboy

== Reception ==
A review by Luisito Joaquín González stated " In the end, the build up of all these negatives massively outweighed the few good parts that I’ve noted. " Rotten tomatoes gave it 14% on its popcornmeter. Big Daddy's Horror Review gave The Catcher one star, and described it as lazy and incompetent. The film was held in similar disdain by Vegan Voorhees, which awarded it a half-star and criticized the plot, acting, editing and gore effects. A Slash Above wrote that while the death scenes and mystery angle were fun and the direction was decent, the story, editing, lighting, score and sound mixing left much to be desired.
