= Zombie Bloodbath =

- Directed by: Todd Sheets
- Written by: Jerry Angell; Todd Sheets; Roger Williams
- Produced by: Todd Sheets
- Cinematography: Andrew Appell; Scott Jolley; Todd Sheets
- Music by: Astoroth; T.J. Erhardt; Enochian Key
- Distributed by: Camp Motion Pictures (DVD)
- Release date: 1993
- Country: United States
- Language: English

Zombie Bloodbath is a 1993 American horror film produced, directed (and co-written) by Todd Sheets.

== Plot ==
The U.S. Government builds a subterranean nuclear power plant on top of an ancient Indian burial ground. As radiation brings the deceased natives back to life as zombies and turns everyone at the plant into blood-crazed zombies, a group of teenagers defends the area from imminent attack.

== Cast ==
- Auggi Alvarez
- Frank Dunlay
- Chris Harris
- T. J. Watkins
- Jerry Angell
- Tonia Monahan
- Cathy Metz
- Cheryl Metz
- Kasey Rausch
- Jody Rovick
- Kyrie King

== Release ==
In 2007, Zombie Bloodbath II: Rage of the Undead and Zombie Bloodbath III: Zombie Armageddon were released in a triple pack with Zombie Bloodbath.

== Reception ==
Bill Gibron of DVD Talk rated it 2.5/5 stars and called it "a nonstop blitz of bile and body parts". Dylan Charles of DVD Verdict called it "an unholy tangle of plotlines and characters" that has well-done gore. Writing in The Zombie Movie Encyclopedia, academic Peter Dendle said, "Though mildly less awful than Sheets' incoherent Zombie Rampage, this Midwest undead saga unreflectively tries to keep the late '70s—early '80s zombie invasion plot on life support, wounding it further with home movie production values."

== See also ==
- List of zombie films
