= Winter of the Dead =

- Original Finnish poster.
- Directed by: Markus Heiskanen
- Written by: Jere Vainikka; Markus Heiskanen
- Produced by: Markus Heiskanen
- Starring: Pasi Martikainen; Antti Riuttanen; Kirsti Savola; Teemu Salonen
- Cinematography: Jere Vainikka
- Edited by: Jere Vainikka
- Music by: Matias Puumala
- Production company: Vesuri Productions
- Release date: 19 May 2005 (Finland)
- Running time: 36 minutes
- Country: Finland
- Language: Finnish
- Budget: €1,000

Winter of the Dead (Finnish: Kuolleiden talvi) is a Finnish 2005 short film written and directed by Markus Heiskanen. It tells story about a few survivors in Finland devastated by nuclear winter, where a zombie apocalypse has begun.

The film was the largest project of the indie film team Vesuri Productions to date, and the first in which the team had a storyboard artist and lighting equipment at their disposal. Planning for the film began as early as September 2004, with shooting starting in February 2005. The film premiered in May of the same year. Winter of the Dead has been awarded as the winner of Kamera magazine's film competition, and it received mostly good feedback by critics. The film was also considered for 3rd place in the youth category of the 2005 SM Film Festival.

The film has been released on DVD.

== Plot ==
Finland has become part of the aftermath of a nuclear war, and the radiation has turned most of the survivors into bloodthirsty zombies and brought about a nuclear winter. The film is about a man named Toni, who has survived zombie attacks and fights against zombies in the deserted North Savonia, where he lives with another survivor, Risto, in the cold of a nuclear winter. They go from time to time to get supplies from a nearby deserted village. As the film progresses, Toni finds a woman lying unconscious on the ground, whom he rescues and takes to his cabin. After refreshing herself, the woman introduces herself as Marika. She too survived the zombie attacks for years with a few other survivors in the city. In the end, however, the zombies killed everyone except Marika, who escaped into the woods. Toni says that he doesn't need company, and that Marika can stay with him until she's healed, as long as she's not in the way. After some time, Toni goes to get supplies from the village, and Marika also comes along. When they get food from the general store, the surviving village crazy threatens them with a gun, because in his opinion, they are "stealing his food". The village crazy shoots Toni, but Toni survives. Marika shoots the village crazy.

When they return to the cabin, where Risto is also, Marika takes care of Toni's wound. There will be a TV broadcast for the first time in years - the broadcast says that most of the zombies haven't eaten properly in a long time, and most of them will starve to death within a few weeks. At the same time, the broadcast also warns that due to hunger, zombies move in even larger herds and are even more aggressive. At the same time, a large horde of zombies attacks the trio's cabin. They shoot many zombies, but one manages to bite Risto on the leg. They decide to save themselves by luring the zombies onto the ice, where Risto has set up a bomb. However, the bomb does not have any kind of remote trigger or timer, but must be triggered manually. Risto sacrifices himself and stays to detonate the bomb so that Marika and Toni would be saved. Marika and Toni run away to a safe distance, while the zombies attack Risto. Risto detonates the bomb, killing himself and all the zombies.

== Cast ==
- Pasi Martikainen as Toni
- Antti Riuttanen as Risto
- Kirsti Savola as Marika
- Teemu Salonen as a village crazy

== Reception ==
Horror Online rated the film 9 out of 10 skulls.

== See also ==
- List of zombie films
