= Ouanga (film) =

- Theatrical release poster
- Directed by: George Terwilliger
- Screenplay by: George Terwilliger
- Produced by: William Saal
- Starring: Fredi Washington
- Cinematography: Carl Berger
- Production company: George Terwilliger Productions
- Distributed by: J.H. Hoffberg Company
- Release date: 1936
- Running time: 56 min
- Country: United States
- Language: English

Ouanga, also advertised as The Love Wanga, is a voodoo-themed 1936 American film starring Fredi Washington. George Terwilliger wrote and directed the film. The film's themes include miscegenation and it features various racial stereotypes and portrays the people who practice voodoo as primitive. The movie is considered to be perhaps the second zombie film ever made after White Zombie.

== Plot ==
Klili Gordon is a half-white and half-black plantation owner who is attracted to Adam Maynard, a nearby plantation owner who is white. Adam is a close friend of Klili, but he fears of their relationship going further due to Gordon's mixed-race heritage per the one-drop rule. Adam chooses Eve, a white woman, over Gordon which causes her to become enraged and turn to voodoo. After a death charm known as a wanga fails to kill Eve, Klili raises 13 black men from the dead to put Eve into a trance so that Klili can murder her. LeStrange, the overseer of Adam's plantation, is adept at voodoo and places a curse on Klili by hanging the dead body of a black woman that is dressed as Klili. After Klili fails to get with Adam and LeStrange fails to murder Klili with voodoo, LeStrange murders Klili by choking her.

== Cast ==
- Fredi Washington as Klili Gordon
- Philip Brandon as Adam Maynard
- Marie Paxton as Eve Langley
- Sheldon Leonard as LeStrange
- Winifred Harris as Aunt Sarah
- Sidney Easton as Jackson
- Babe Joyce as Susie
- George Spink as Johnson

== Production ==
Ouanga is the second film to feature zombies, after the 1932 film White Zombie. Black actress Fredi Washington was cast to play the "tragic mulatto" role of Klili Gordon while white actor Sheldon Leonard was cast as LeStrange, the black man who looks over Adam's plantation. LeStrange may have been cast as a black character due to an incident involving the 1933 film The Emperor Jones, in which censors thought that Washington kissing a black man looked too close to "a white woman kissing a black man". In The Emperor Jones, Washington wore darker makeup to look "more black".

It was planned for the production crew to hire dancers and drummers from Haiti, but the plan did not happen due to the papaloi, male voodoo priests, objecting and the director was threatened with a wanga placed in his car. The person in charge of props stole sacred objects including stuffed snakeskins and skulls for the film's production from Haiti. The filming was moved to Jamaica where it was reported by Roger Luckhurst that two crew members died from a cyclone. Author Toni Pressley-Sanon wrote that two crew members died with one being killed by a barracuda and one dying from yellow fever.

The film was not released in the United States until 1942. Ouanga was remade into the 1939 film The Devil's Daughter to appeal to a black audience despite it being created by whites. The UCLA Film & Television Archive restored the film in 2015. On June 10, 2021, UCLA held a virtual screening of the restored film.

== Reception ==
Lionel Collier of Picturegoer wrote that it was a "drama clumsily built around 'Voodooism'" and that it was "extremely crudely produced and badly acted", though he praised the authentic settings.
