= The Lucky Toothache =

1910 film

- Directed by: Frank Powell
- Written by: Mack Sennett
- Based on: Short story by George Terwilliger
- Produced by: Biograph Company
- Starring: Mary Pickford; Mack Sennett
- Cinematography: Arthur Marvin
- Distributed by: Biograph Company
- Release date: October 13, 1910
- Running time: 600 feet
- Country: United States
- Language: Silent (English intertitles)

The Lucky Toothache is a 1910 American silent film short directed by Frank Powell and starring Mary Pickford and Mack Sennett. It was produced and distributed by the Biograph Company.

== Plot ==
The film survives because it was transferred by the Library of Congress from a paper print.

== Cast ==
- Mary Pickford as Bessie
- Mack Sennett as Tom
- Kate Bruce as Bessie's Mother
- W. Chrystie Miller as Bessie's Father

=== Uncredited ===
- Linda Arvidson
- Charles Craig as One of the Boys
- Edward Dillon as One of the Boys
- Dell Henderson
- Fred Mace
- Claire McDowell as A Cousin
- Billy Quirk
- Charles West as One of the Boys
