= Jack Carter (stage actor) =

American actor (1902–1967)

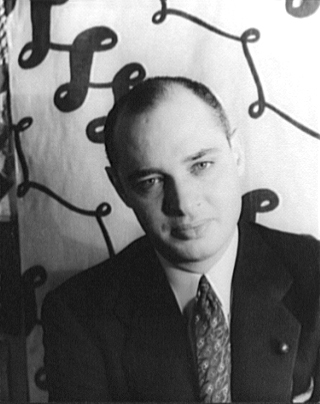
- Jack Carter in April 1936, photographed by Carl Van Vechten
- Born: circa 1902
- Died: November 9, 1967 (aged 65)
- Occupation: Actor
- Years active: 1920s-1940s

Jack Carter (c. 1902 – November 9, 1967) was an American actor. He is known for creating the role of Crown in the original Broadway production of Porgy (1927), and for starring in Orson Welles stage productions including Macbeth (1936) and Doctor Faustus (1937). He appeared in a few motion pictures in the 1930s and 1940s.

== Career ==
Jack Carter created the role of Crown in the original stage production of Porgy. | From 1928 to 1929 Carter portrayed Crown in a national tour production of Porgy. The tour included nine weeks in Chicago, six weeks in London, and performances in Boston, Philadelphia, Cincinnati, Washington, Cleveland, Pittsburgh, Baltimore, Detroit, San Francisco, Los Angeles, and cities in the northwestern United States and Canada From September 16 to October 24, 1931, Carter portrayed the role of Dave Crocker in Singin' the Blues at the Liberty Theatre in New York. During 1934 Carter performance in a New York production of Stevedore as Lonnie Thompson at the Civic Repertory Theatre. He started the role in April through July, and resumed his role in October through November 1934.

He is perhaps best known for having starred in the Federal Theatre Project's 1936 New York production of William Shakespeare's Macbeth that came to be known as the Voodoo Macbeth. Orson Welles adapted and directed the play, moved its setting from Scotland to a fictional Caribbean island, recruited an entirely African American cast, and earned the nickname for his production from the Haitian vodou that fulfilled the rôle of Scottish witchcraft. In 1936, at the Lafayette Theatre in Harlem, New York, a free preview drew 3,000 more people than could be seated The show reportedly was sold out for all ten weeks. During its run at the Adelphi Theatre on Broadway, Carter completed only Act I of the July 15 performance, which was then completed by understudy Thomas Anderson. Beginning July 16, Maurice Ellis played the role of Macbeth in the remainder of the run at the Adelphi Theatre and on the subsequent national tour.

Welles later cast Carter as Mephistopheles in Doctor Faustus (1937), a Federal Theatre Project 891 production in which Welles played Faust.

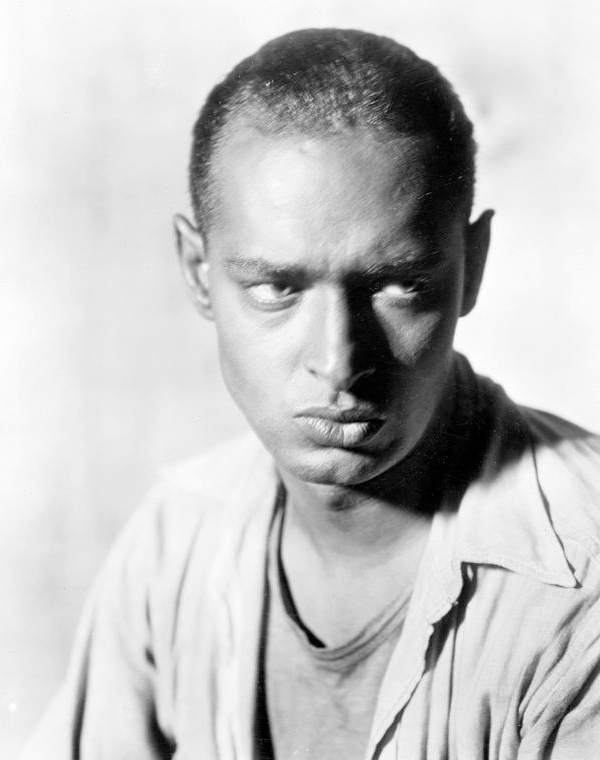
Jack Carter as Crown in Porgy (1927–30)

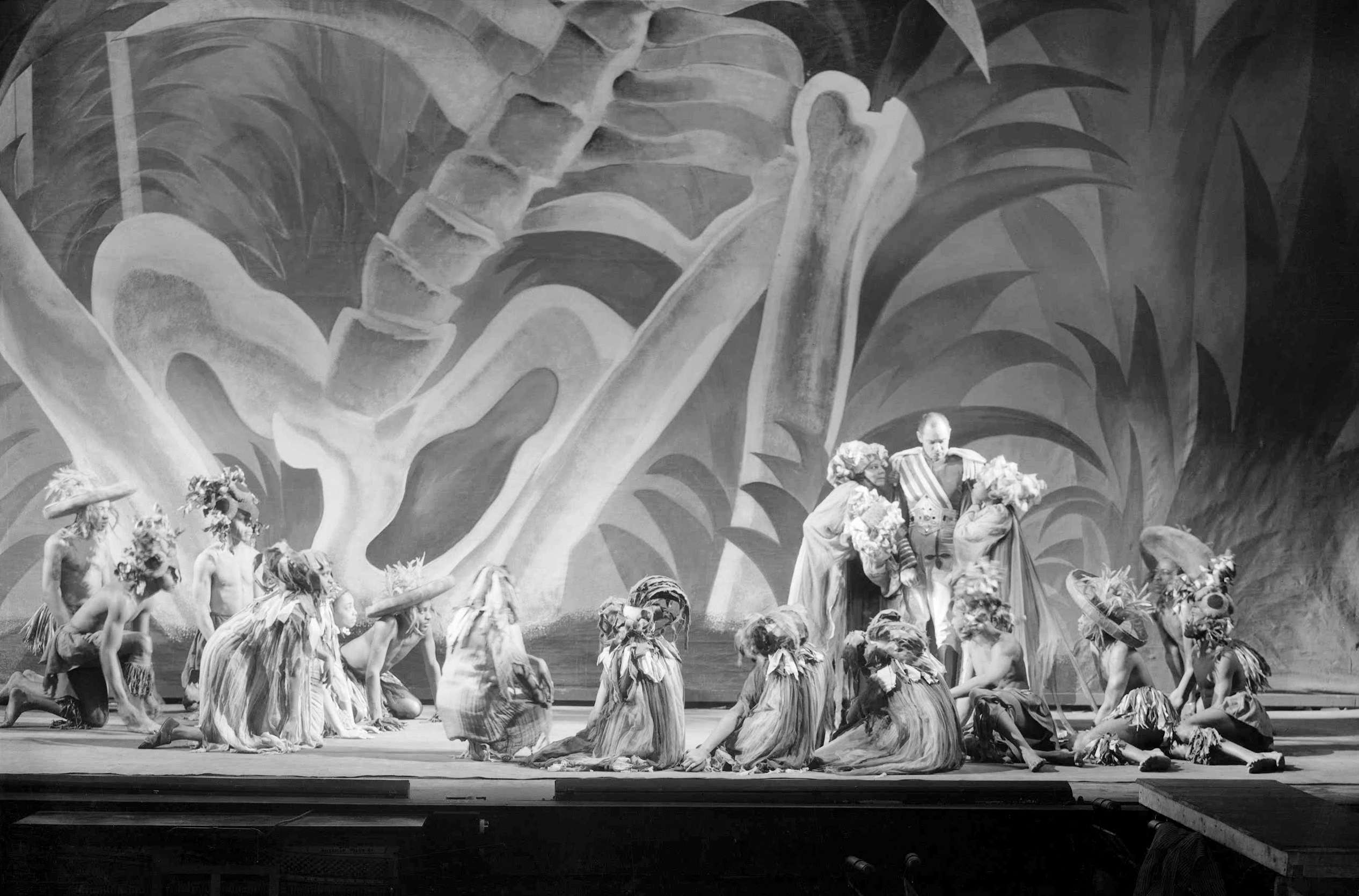
Jack Carter in Voodoo Macbeth (1936)

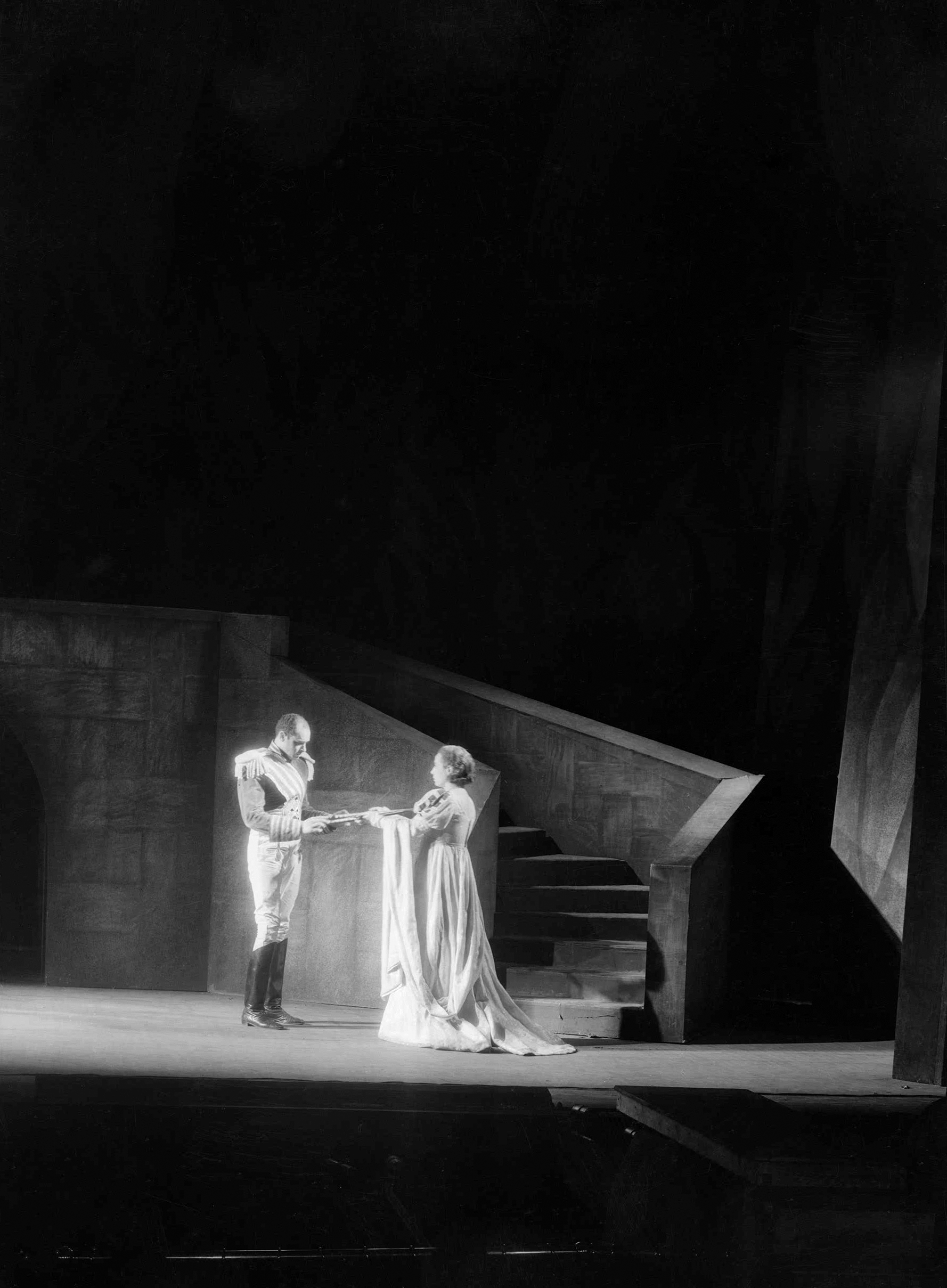
Jack Carter and Edna Thomas in Voodoo Macbeth

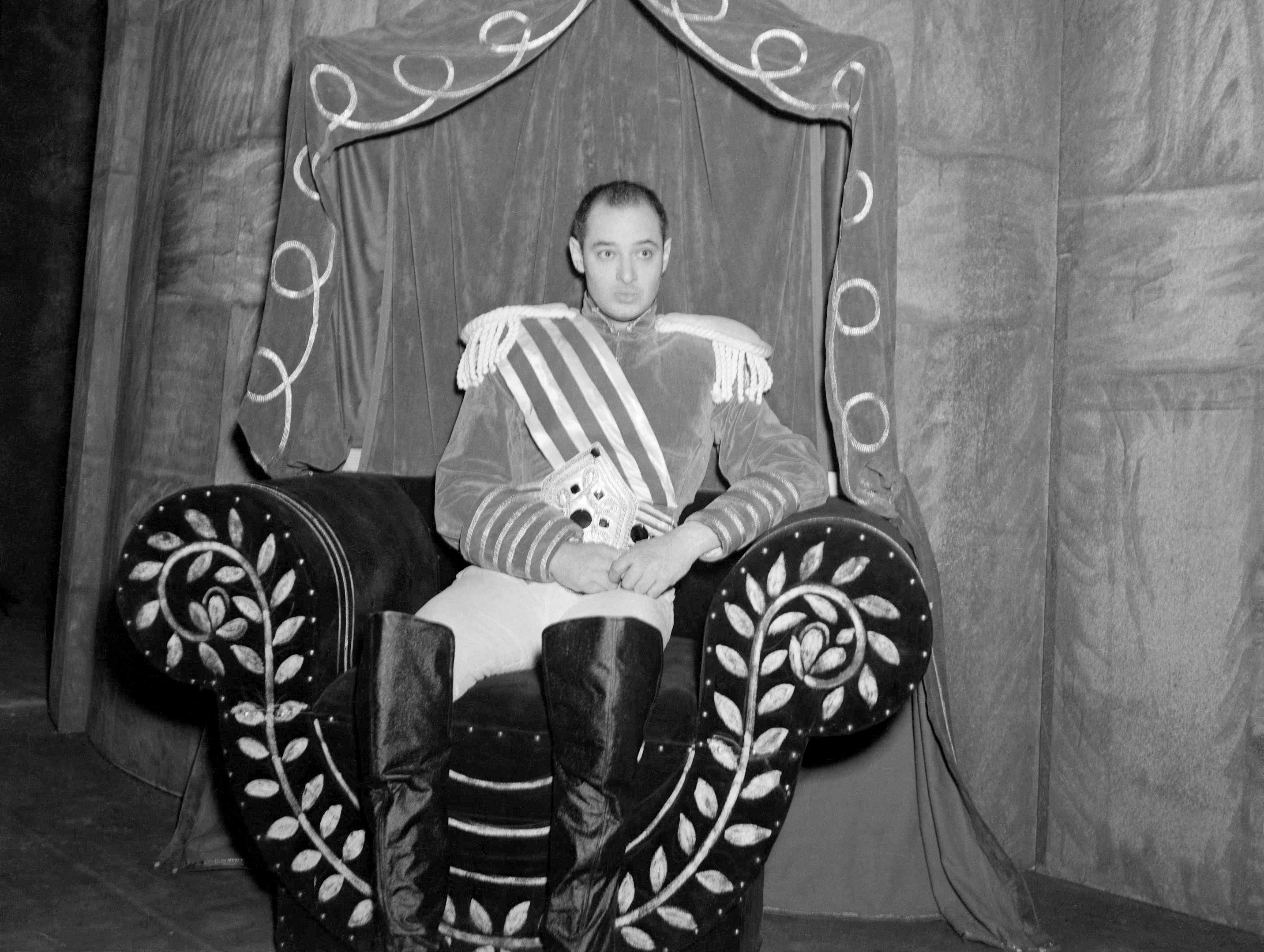
Jack Carter in Voodoo Macbeth (1936)

== Work ==
=== Theatre ===
Year	Title	Role	Venue	Ref
1927	Goat Alley	Policeman	Princess Theatre, Broadway	
1927-28	Porgy	Crown	Guild Theatre, Broadway	
1928–29	Porgy	Crown	US National tour	
1929	Porgy	Crown	Martin Beck Theatre, Broadway	
1929–30	Porgy	Crown	2nd National tour	
1931	Singin' the Blues	Dave Crocker	Liberty Theatre, New York	
1934	Stevedore	Lonnie Thompson	Civic Repertory Theatre, New York	
1936	Voodoo Macbeth	Macbeth	Lafayette Theatre, Harlem, New York	
1936	Voodoo Macbeth	Macbeth	Lafayette Theatre, Harlem, New York	
1936	Voodoo Macbeth	Macbeth	Adelphi Theatre on Broadway	
1937	Doctor Faustus	Mephistopheles	Maxine Elliott Theatre, New York	

=== Filmography ===
Year	Title	Role	Notes
1934	Charlie Chan's Courage	Victor Jordan	
1939	The Devil's Daughter	Philip Ramsay	
1939	Straight to Heaven	Stanley Jackson	
1942	Take My Life	Sergeant Holmes	
1945	Confidential Agent	Singer	Uncredited
1947	Sepia Cinderella	Ralph Williams	
1948	Miracle in Harlem	Philip Manley	(final film role)
