= Tom's Little Star =

1919 film

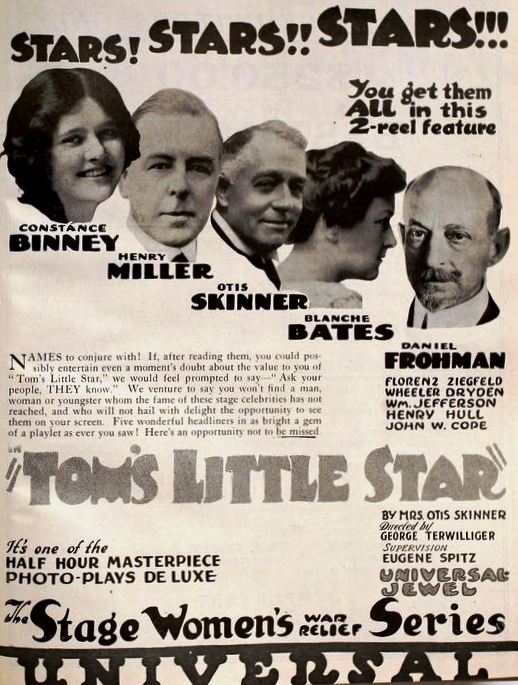
Ad for film

Tom's Little Star is a 1919 short film and a part of the Stage Women's War Relief films.

It is unknown if a copy of this film survives, but more of a chance it might be lost. The film, directed by George Terwilliger, is known for being the oldest film appearance of Broadway producer Florenz Ziegfeld Jr.
