= Dawn of the Dead =

Dawn of the Dead may refer to:

== In film ==
- Dawn of the Dead (1978 film), a horror film written and directed by George A. Romero
- Dawn of the Dead (2004 film), a remake of the 1978 film directed by Zack Snyder

== In music ==
- "Dawn of the Dead" (song), a 2008 single by the electronic rock band Does It Offend You, Yeah?
- "Dawn of the Dead", a song by Schoolyard Heroes from the 2003 album The Funeral Sciences
- "Dawn of the Dead", a song by Murderdolls from the 2002 album Beyond the Valley of the Murderdolls

== See also ==
- Curse of the Maya, also known as Dawn of the Living Dead, a 2004 horror film
