= Deep River: The Island =

- Theatrical poster
- Directed by: Ben Bachelder
- Written by: George Stuckert
- Produced by: Ben Bachelder; Clayton Moore; Susan Stuckert-Bachelder; George Stuckert
- Starring: Kristopher Bowman; Maia Kaufhold
- Cinematography: Clayton Moore
- Edited by: Ben Bachelder
- Music by: Cassidy Bisher; Casino; Richard DeHove; Drop Drop; Lee Fitzsimmons
- Release date: July 3, 2009
- Running time: 76 minutes
- Countries: Canada; United States
- Language: English
- Budget: $35,000 (estimated)

Deep River: The Island is a Canadian zombie comedy film released in 2009. The motion picture was written by George Stuckert and directed by Ben Bachelder. The movie was produced by Ben Bachelder, Clayton Moore, Susan Stuckert-Bachelder, and George Stuckert. The music score was written by Cassidy Bisher, Casino, Richard DeHove, Drop Drop, and Lee Fitzsimmons. It stars Kristopher Bowman, Maia Kaufhold and Jo-Ellen Size. The movie was filmed in Deep River, Ontario, Canada.

The movie was filmed between July 28, 2008 - October 2, 2008. It was released on July 28, 2010 at the Action On Film International Film Festival and on October 2010 at the Eerie Horror Film Festival.

== Summary ==
Six friends from a small rural Canadian high school, reunite for the summer and must fight for survival against the undead.

== Cast ==
- Kristopher Bowman as Sean
- Maia Kaufhold as Jen
- Jo-Ellen Size as Emily
- Mark Von Sell as Aaron
- Robin Dwyer as Jerm
- Andrew Nosek as Trevor
- R.J. Frost as Zombie
- Jessica Pettigrew as Bikini Zombie

=== Additional Zombies ===
- J. Barton
- Gordon Bell
- Katie Bell
- Nicholas Brown
- Dylan Cameron
- Katy Celovsky
- William Clifford
- Jackie McCarthy
- Sean Stanley
- Tiffany-Lee Holmes
- Tyler Holmes
- Joseph Mayberry

== See also ==
- List of zombie films
