= The Curse of Naar =

Book by Joe Dever

- American cover, original release
- Author: Joe Dever
- Illustrator: Brian Williams
- Cover artist: Peter Andrew Jones (UK); Dave Dorman (USA)
- Language: English
- Series: Lone Wolf
- Genre: Fantasy
- Publisher: Red Fox (UK); Berkley / Pacer (USA)
- Publication date: 1993
- Publication place: United Kingdom
- Media type: Print (Paperback)
- ISBN: 0-425-15193-X
- OCLC: 34065767
- Preceded by: Wolf's Bane
- Followed by: Voyage of the Moonstone

The Curse of Naar is the twentieth book in the award-winning Lone Wolf book series created by Joe Dever. This is the final book in the "Grand Master" series, and the last one released in North America.

== Gameplay ==
Lone Wolf books rely on a combination of thought and luck. Certain statistics such as combat skill and endurance attributes are determined randomly before play. The player is then allowed to choose Grandmaster Kai disciplines and a selection of Dessi and Crystal Star magics. This number depends directly on how many books in the series have been completed ("Grandmaster rank"). With each additional book completed, the player chooses one additional discipline. The Grandmaster series is different from any in the previous series of books because it gives Lone Wolf spells to use which grow more numerous as his Grandmaster Rank increases.

== Plot ==
In this book you (in the guise of the heroic Lone Wolf) again travel to the Plane of Darkness. Your quest involves rescuing an artifact crafted by the Lords of Light - the Moonstone - from the Dark God's clutches. The Plane of Darkness is a predictably nasty place, and even a being as powerful as a Kai Grand Master may shrink from the challenge. Dare you face up to the Dark God Naar himself?
