= Binge & Purge (film) =

2002 Canadian horror film

- Directed by: Brian Clement
- Written by: Brian Clement
- Produced by: Brian Clement
- Starring: Tamara Barnard; Stephan Bourke; Fiona Eden-Walker; Moira Thomas; Amy Emel; Samara Zotzman; Gareth Gaudin; Rob Nesbitt; Chuck Depape
- Cinematography: Brian Clement
- Edited by: Brian Clement
- Music by: Justin Hagberg
- Production company: Frontline Films
- Distributed by: Sub Rosa Studios
- Release date: July 14, 2002
- Running time: 83 minutes
- Country: Canada
- Language: English

Binge & Purge (aka Binge and Purge and Catwalk Cannibals) is a 2002 Canadian horror film written and directed by Brian Clement. It is about cannibal models who plot to take over a fascist police state.

== Plot ==
In the near future, the United States has become a fascist police state. A string of brutal murders leads private investigators to uncover a secret plot by cannibals in control of the fashion industry.

== Cast ==
- Tamara Barnard as May
- Stephan Bourke as Vanzetti
- Fiona Eden-Walker as Number 11
- Moira Thomas as Audrey
- Amy Emel as Angelique
- Samara Zotzman as Damiana
- Gareth Gaudin as Karl Helfringer
- Rob Nesbitt as Bradley Gruber
- Chuck Depape as the Captain

== Reception ==
Andy McKeague of Monsters and Critics rated the film 2.5/5 stars and called it "a gut munching romp that is big on intestine chewing but low on plot". James O'Ehley of Scifi Movie Page rated it 1/5 stars and wrote that it could be used as blackmail for all involved. Michael Muzerall as Film Threat rated it 3/5 stars and wrote, "The film has all the right factors to be the next big thing in cult movies, but it lacks the feverish style or the ripping wit to cement the deal."
