= Eat Me! (2009 film) =

- Directed by: Katie Carman
- Written by: Elizabeth Lee
- Produced by: Katie Carman; Elizabeth Lee; Spinning Hexagon
- Starring: Elizabeth Lee; Jun Naito; Ivy Hong; Chesley Calloway
- Cinematography: Eddie Lebron
- Edited by: Katie Carman
- Music by: Bathlord
- Release date: June 26, 2009 (Anthology Film Archives)
- Running time: 90 minutes
- Country: United States
- Language: English

Eat Me! is a 2009 zombie comedy independent film directed by Katie Carman and starring Elizabeth Lee, Jun Naito, Ivy Hong, and Chesley Calloway. The film had its premiere screening on June 26, 2009 at the Anthology Film Archives. The filmmakers changed the title of the film from The Eaters to Eat Me! in August 2009.

== Plot ==
A Brooklyn garage band, General Malacarne, survives a radioactive event and have to battle against zombies to what they believe is the safe haven of Long Island.

== Premise ==
Eat Me! is the first feature comedy stoner zombie film. The film is set in Brooklyn, New York but shot in Brooklyn, Queens, and partially in Nassau County.

== Festivals ==
Eat Me! was chosen as an official selection of Long Island International Film Expo. The New York Times named Eat Me! as a film of interest as part of the Long Island International Film Expo. The film was also chosen to screen as part of the New Filmmakers Summer Series at Anthology Film Archives in August 2009.

== Release ==
Eat Me! was released on various Video On Demand platforms in September 2014 through indie distributor Cinema Epoch, including on Cox Communications, Comcast, Verizon and Dish Network. The film is also available through Epix, as well as SnagFilms and Amazon.com. In November 2010 it was released in Japan by Japan Video Distribution's "Deep Red" label under the title Break of the Dead.

== See also ==
- List of zombie films
