= Angel Blade (film) =

2002 film directed by David Heavener

- Directed by: David Heavener
- Written by: David Heavener
- Starring: David Heavener; Marc Singer; Margot Kidder
- Production companies: Revolution Film Works; Vegas Knights
- Release date: February 10, 2002
- Running time: 93 minutes
- Country: United States
- Language: English
- Budget: $2 million

Angel Blade is a 2002 erotic thriller film directed by David Heavener and starring Heavener, Marc Singer and Amanda Righetti.

The film premiered at the New York International Independent Film and Video Festival in April 2002.

== Cast ==
- David Heavener as Bradley Cooper
- Marc Singer as Dr. Martin Gites
- Margot Kidder as Frida
- Richard Moll as Carl Shank
- Louis Mandylor as Kiel Parsons
- Dan Martin as Lieutenant Paul Jackson
- Don Wallace as Tyrone
- Amanda Righetti as Samantha Goodman
- Bob Stupak as Man
- Hillary Crouse as Susan Cooper
- Oscar Goodman as Himself, The Mayor
- Anthony Mahaffy as Hoyt
- Abigail Forsman as Angel (credited as Abigal Forsman)
- Coco Austin as Darla
- Michael Hemenway as Officer Dooright
- Jack Campbell as Officer Budwack
- Bethany Rigazio as Victim #1
- Heather Sturm as Victim #2
- Heather Fletcher as Hooker
- Theresa Mordaunt as Hooker
- Kristy Ennis as Hooker
- Cyndie Gregware as Hooker
- Debra Ballweg as Hooker
- Summer Stupak as Lingerie Shop MC
- Jennifer Austin as Dancer
- Christine Cox as Dancer
- Bonnie Tarasy as Dancer
- Jessica Williams as Dancer
- Kathleen Pederson as Bohemian Desk Clerk
- Dana Dicillo as Bohemian Girl (credited as Dana Dicilli)
- Dylan Ziegler as Alex Cooper
- Bonnie Takasy as Topless Dancer (uncredited)

== Reception ==
Geoff Carter of the Las Vegas Sun called the film "so dang stoopid" and said there were "dozens of films similar to this on Showtime, so-called 'erotic thrillers' that should have been pornographic movies, if they had any integrity". Las Vegas CityLife reviewer Anthony Allison said it was a "straight-to-tape exploitation" and "as jaw-dropping a spectacle as the Bellagio fountains".

Film Threat's Amanda Reyes said Angel Blade had numerous components that "make it stand out above other erotic thrillers" and called it "a sinister exercise in disturbing realism". Filmdienst thought it was "a sexist thriller with a formulaic plot".
