= Wolf's Bane =

Book by Joe Dever

- American cover, original release
- Author: Joe Dever
- Illustrator: Brian Williams
- Cover artist: Peter Andrew Jones (UK); Dave Dorman (USA)
- Language: English
- Series: Lone Wolf
- Genre: Fantasy
- Publisher: Red Fox (UK); Berkley / Pacer (USA)
- Publication date: 1993
- Publication place: United Kingdom
- Media type: Print (Paperback)
- ISBN: 0-425-14976-5
- OCLC: 33226972
- Preceded by: Dawn of the Dragons
- Followed by: The Curse of Naar

Wolf's Bane is the nineteenth book in the Lone Wolf book series created by Joe Dever and now illustrated by Brian Williams.

== Gameplay ==
Lone Wolf books rely on a combination of thought and luck. Certain statistics such as combat skill and endurance attributes are determined randomly before play. The player is then allowed to choose Grandmaster Kai disciplines and a selection of Dessi and Crystal Star magics. This number depends directly on how many books in the series have been completed ("Grandmaster rank"). With each additional book completed, the player chooses one additional discipline. The Grandmaster series is different from any in the previous series of books because it gives Lone Wolf spells to use which grow more numerous as his Grandmaster Rank increases.

== Plot ==
Lone Wolf learns that the evil god Naar has created an evil doppelganger of himself, the champion of the forces of good on Magnamund. A cat and mouse game between the two warriors ensues, which leads both across a world claimed by Naar.
