= David J. Francis (actor) =

Canadian actor and director

- Born: David J. Francis; 2 December 1970 (age 55); Ottawa, Ontario, Canada
- Other name: Dave Francis
- Occupations: Film director film producer screenwriter actor editor
- Years active: 1999–present
- Spouse: Amber Lynn Francis (1999–2002)

David J. Francis (born 2 December 1970 in Ottawa, Ontario) is a Canadian actor, director, producer, editor and screenwriter.

== Career ==
Francis began his career with minor roles in the television series Amazon (1999) and The Ladies Man (2000). His first major role was Jesus in Dracula 2000. In the early 2000s, he had more minor roles in the Canadian film The Matthew Shepard Story and as a floor manager in Gilda Radner: It's Always Something. In 2003, he directed his first film, a zombie film called Zombie Night. He also served as writer and producer alongside his wife, Amber Lynn Francis. He returned as Jesus in the sequel to Dracula 2000, Dracula II: Ascension (2003) and had a minor role in the television movie Shattered City: The Halifax Explosion. Francis then directed his second movie, the sequel to Zombie Night, Zombie Night 2: Awakening (2006) and the third movie of the trilogy, Reel Zombies (2008).

== Personal life ==
Francis was married to actress and producer Amber Lynn Francis, who died on 19 March 2002, a few days after the birth of their child.

== Filmography ==
Year	Film	Functioned as					Notes
Year	Film	Director	Writer	Producer	Actor	Role	Notes
1999	Amazon	No	No	No	Yes	Callum	Television series
2000	The Ladies Man	No	No	No	Yes	V.S.A. Member	Uncredited
2000	Dracula 2000	No	No	No	Yes	Jesus Christ	
2002	The Matthew Shepard Story	No	No	No	Yes	Dave	Uncredited
2002	Gilda Radner: It's Always Something	No	No	No	Yes	SNL Floor Manager	
2003	Dracula II: Ascension	No	No	No	Yes	Jesus Christ	
2003	Shattered City: The Halifax Explosion	No	No	No	Yes	Mr. Hinch	
2003	Zombie Night	Yes	Yes	Yes	Yes	Man Peeing	
2006	Zombie Night 2: Awakening	Yes	Yes	No	Yes	Father	
2008	Reel Zombies	Yes	No	Yes	Yes	Himself	Also editor
2009	Silent Sam	No	No	No	Yes	Jimmy's Thug	
