= Caustic Zombies =

- Directed by: Johnny Daggers
- Written by: Johnny Daggers
- Cinematography: James Bowley
- Edited by: James Bowley; Johnny Daggers; John Stefanik
- Music by: Nim Vind; Serpenteens; DieMonsterDie; Johnny B. Morbid; The Dead Vampires; 13PaganHoliday13; Horrid Ordeal; Rozz Williams; Kult Ikon; Veniculture; Toxic Zombies; Sick City Daggers
- Release date: July 22, 2011
- Country: United States
- Language: English

Caustic Zombies is an independent horror film written and directed by Johnny Daggers. It was filmed in Latrobe and Ligonier, Pennsylvania. The film premiered on July 22, 2011 at the Hollywood Theater in Dormont, Pennsylvania.

== Plot ==
Residents of a small town must survive a zombie attack stemming from the Three Mile Island accident.

== Cast and crew ==
The cast and crew listed at the film's official website are:

- Aleesha Asper – survivor
- Greg Wainwright – survivor
- Jake Hursh – survivor
- Melanie Stone – caged zombie
- Chad Hammitt – zombie hunter
- Matt Eames – hacker
- Writer/Director – Johnny Daggers
- Cinematographer – James Bowley
- Editor – James Bowley, Johnny Daggers, John Stefanik
- Title Credits Design – Brian Cottington
- Key grip – Barry Stephens
