= Meat Market (film) =

2000 Canadian by Brian Clement

- Directed by: Brian Clement
- Written by: Brian Clement
- Story by: Nick Sheehan; Tania Willard
- Starring: Claire Westby; Paul Pedrosa; Alison Therriault; Teresa Simon; Chelsey Arentsen; Cam Pipes; Ken Peters; Clifton Mitchell; Bryn Johnson
- Edited by: Brian Clement
- Music by: Justin Hagberg
- Production companies: Frontline Films; Sub Rosa Studios
- Distributed by: Sub Rosa Studios
- Release date: December 6, 2000
- Running time: 90 minutes
- Country: Canada
- Language: English

Meat Market is a 2000 Canadian horror film directed and written by Brian Clement, based on a story by Nick Sheehan and Tania Willard. It stars Claire Westby and Paul Pedrosa as survivors of a zombie apocalypse who team up with a masked Mexican wrestler and a trio of vampires. The film was followed by two sequels, Meat Market 2 and Meat Market 3.

== Plot ==
Ex-bounty hunters Argenta and Shahrokh discover that a wave of murders is the work of zombies. They team up with a trio of female vampires – Nemesis, Valeria, and Tiamat – and a masked Mexican wrestler, El Diablo Azul, against the zombies. Eventually, they learn that the zombies are reanimated by nanobots, which gives the zombies a collective consciousness. In the end, the scientist who created them is killed by his own creations.

== Cast ==
- Claire Westby as Argenta
- Paul Pedrosa as Shahrokh
- Alison Therriault as Nemesis
- Teresa Simon as Valeria
- Chelsey Arentsen as Tiamat
- Cam Pipes as El Diablo Azul
- Ivan Meade as El Diablo Azul (voice)
- Ken Peters as Dr. Oppenheim
- Clifton Mitchell as Lt. Ayers
- Bryn Johnson as Pvt. Holden

== Release ==
Sub Rosa Studios released the film in a bundle with the sequel in January 2007.

== Reception ==
Bloody Disgusting rated the film 2.5/5 stars and said that the rating would have been lower had it not been an independent film, though the special effects were described as "decent". Beyond Hollywood wrote that the film "suffers from every known pitfall of no-budget filmmaking, but in the end still manages to impress — if just slightly." Writing in The Zombie Movie Encyclopedia Volume 2, Peter Dendle called it a "sad opus shot on Super VHS" that shows little of the creativity that goes into low budget labors of love.
