= Necropolis Awakened =

- Directed by: Garrett White
- Written by: Garrett White
- Produced by: Duke White
- Starring: Duke White; Brandon White; Garrett White
- Edited by: Garrett White
- Music by: Garrett White
- Production company: Hudson Productions
- Distributed by: Pathfinder Pictures
- Release date: November 22, 2002
- Running time: 93 minutes
- Country: United States
- Language: English
- Budget: $10,000

Necropolis Awakened is a 2002 American action-horror film written and directed by Garrett White. It stars Duke White, Brandon White, and Garrett White in multiple roles. An evil corporation bent on world domination begins their genetic experimentation in a small Oregon town, but they find unexpected resistance from an alcoholic veteran.

== Plot ==
Skyhook, a small Oregon town, is chosen to be the new headquarters of Neo-Genentrix. Nefarious Thorne, the genocidal CEO, unleashes a genetic experiment that converts most of the inhabitants of Skyhook into zombies. Unsatisfied with anything less than complete domination, Thorne brings in assassins to hunt down the last remaining human, Bob, an alcoholic war hero and survivalist who was initially responsible for inviting Neo-Genentrix in Skyhook. When Bob evades the mercenaries, Thorne himself tracks him down and captures him. However, Bob is able to turn the tables on his captors and stop their plans for world domination.

== Cast ==
- Duke White as Bob and Judas
- Brandon White as Johnny Gog, Nefarious Thorne, and Graven
- Garrett White as Tiden
- Brandon Dubisar as Detroit
- Coren Slogowski as Billie Sigmund

== Production ==
Necropolis Awakened was shot in Madras, Oregon over a period of 90 days, starting in May 2002. Duke, the father of Brandon and Garrett, initially rejected the idea of a zombie film, as he felt the concept was played out. Garrett was able to convince Duke that an action-horror hybrid film could be original. Local residents volunteered as extras, and the sheriff's department allowed shooting at a newly built jail. The Whites later worked more closely with the sheriff's department after someone mistakenly alerted the FBI about possible terrorist activity.

== Release ==
Necropolis Awakened premiered in Madras, Oregon and received a limited theatrical release in December 2002.

== Reception ==
Mike Watt of Film Threat rated it 3/5 stars and wrote that it is a likely cult film whose deficiencies "come with the indie territory." In a mixed review, Bill Gibron of DVD Verdict called it an "ambitious, flawed, and ultimately unsatisfying film." Joblo.com rated it 5/10 stars and wrote, "Necropolis Awakened is an ambitious low-budget flick that doesn't always have the script, the actors or the coin to back it up, but is still definitely a cut above its ilk." Peter Dendle called it a "ridiculous micro-budget opus".
