= Pushin' Up Daisies =

2010 film

- Film poster
- Directed by: Patrick Franklin
- Screenplay by: Patrick Franklin
- Story by: Patrick Franklin; Robert J. Wagstaff
- Produced by: Patrick Franklin
- Cinematography: Tom Pritchard
- Production company: Pushin' Up Daisies
- Release date: April 16, 2010 (Atlanta Film Festival)
- Running time: 87 minutes
- Country: United States
- Language: English

Pushin' Up Daisies is a 2010 American comedy film written and directed by Patrick Franklin. It stars Sheehan O'Heron and Orlando Vicente as documentary filmmakers Darren and Anthony, who film Darren's brother, Rusty (Simon Sorrells). In the midst of their documentary, a zombie attack breaks out. It premiered at the Atlanta Film Festival on April 16, 2010.

== Plot ==
Documentary filmmaker Darren convinces his friend Anthony to travel with him back to his hometown in Georgia and make a film about Darren's brother, Rusty, a flower deliveryman. With the help of the blind voice actor Mr. Emerson, they follow the reluctant subject throughout his delivery schedule despite his objections. While filming, a zombie outbreak occurs, and Rusty insists that they continue the documentary. Annoyed with the disruption from zombies, Rusty attempts to shoot around them and maintain his creative vision, which does not allow for zombies in his artistic documentary.

== Cast ==
- Sheehan O'Heron as Darren
- Orlando Vicente as Anthony
- Simon Sorrells as Rusty
- Ken Osbourn as Mr. Emerson
- Mitch Maxey as Dunbar

== Production ==
The film was shot in Crawfordville and Washington, Georgia. It was shot on a consumer video camera and presented as found footage. Franklin conceived of the idea for the film while driving through a quiet town on the way to shoot a documentary. He began to brainstorm ideas with a friend, eventually deciding on a story that involves a documentary filmmaker who refuses to acknowledge a supernatural disaster. Shooting began in 2007 and ended in 2009.

== Release ==
Pushin' Up Daisies premiered at the Atlanta Film Festival on April 16, 2010. It was later shown at Athfest on July 25, 2010. Franklin turned to Kickstarter to raise funds for distribution.

== Reception ==
Mark Bell of Film Threat rated it 4/5 stars and called it "a fun, entertaining film on a number of levels". Andrew Shearer of the Athens Banner-Herald wrote that the film avoids the common pitfalls of both mockumentaries and zombie films.
