= Brian Clement =

Canadian independent film director, writer, and producer

- Born: March 21, 1977 (age 48); Kelowna, British Columbia, Canada
- Occupations: director, writer, and producer
- Known for: Meat Market film series

Brian Clement (born March 21, 1977) is a Canadian independent film director, writer, and producer. He is most well known for his low budget zombie films, including Meat Market, Meat Market 2, and Meat Market 3.

== Life and career ==
Clement was born in Kelowna, British Columbia, but his family moved to Victoria, British Columbia, in 1980, where he grew up. He lived for a year in Japan teaching English from 1996 to 1997 and met several relatives; Clement is of Japanese-Canadian and English descent. His mother is Japanese-Canadian. His second middle name is the Japanese name "Haruo".

In Victoria, Clement made several short films and an historical drama feature in 1999. In 2000, Meat Market, made for under $CAD 2,000, was picked up for distribution by Sub Rosa Cinema (later SRS Cinema), based out of upstate New York. During his time working on low-budget and direct-to-video features in Victoria, he won several local awards including three M-Awards from Monday Magazine for his films. Clement's 2003 feature Exhumed won Best Independent Feature at the 2004 Fangoria Days of Darkness Convention's Film Competition in Los Angeles. After several zombie films, he decided that he wanted to branch out to psychological thrillers and science fiction. He was tempted back to zombie films in 2006 for Meat Market 3 when UK-based Cryptkeeper Films offered to produce it. His final feature in Victoria was Dark Paradox, a 2007 film about a writer who battles a cult that worships an extra-dimensional tentacled entity. It screened in 2008 at the Rio de Janeiro Riofan Fantastic Film Fest and the H.P. Lovecraft Film Festival in Portland, Oregon.

In 2008, he moved to Toronto and worked on several short films and directed music videos for Canadian music groups Hank & Lily and Techromancer. In 2009, he wrote a sci-fi/horror conspiracy thriller screenplay, which was reworked into Project Breakwater, a science fiction film about an alien scientist studying humanity. In 2012, he adapted and expanded the same original screenplay to the unrelated novel The Final Transmission, which was published by Damnation Books in December 2013.

== Filmography ==
=== Films ===
- Meat Market (2000)
- Meat Market 2 (2001)
- Binge & Purge (2002)
- Exhumed (2003)
- The Dead Inside (2005)
- Meat Market 3 (2006)
- Dark Paradox (2007)
- Project Breakwater (2012)

=== Web series ===
- Improbabilia (2013)

== Bibliography ==
- The Final Transmission (2013)
