= Bong of the Dead =

- Directed by: Thomas Newman
- Written by: Thomas Newman
- Produced by: Mike Fields; Jodi Thomas; Thomas Newman
- Starring: Simone Bailly; Mark Sweatman; Jy Harris; Barry Nerling
- Cinematography: Thomas Newman
- Edited by: Thomas Newman
- Music by: Thomas Newman
- Production companies: Mind In Motion Productions; Killed by Death Productions
- Distributed by: Left Films
- Release date: 12 May 2011 (Cannes Independent Film Festival)
- Running time: 91 minutes
- Country: Canada
- Language: English
- Budget: $5,000

Bong of the Dead is a 2011 Canadian action horror comedy film directed by Thomas Newman, starring Simone Bailly, Mark Sweatman, Jy Harris and Barry Nerling.

== Cast ==
- Simone Bailly as Leah
- Mark Sweatman as Edwin
- Jy Harris as Tommy
- Barry Nerling as Alex

== Release ==
The film premiered at the Cannes Independent Film Festival.

== Reception ==
The film received a score of 3 out of 5 in HorrorNews.net. Phil Wheat of Nerdly wrote a positive review of the film, writing that "if you like your budgets very low, the gore quotient very high, and huge dollops of stoner humour you might find yourself enjoying it."

Gareth Jones of Dread Central rated the film 2.5 out of 5, writing that "Newman most certainly has the chops to move on to bigger and better things, and gore and zombie fans will find enough to keep them interested — but Bong of the Dead fails to ignite with its script and quickly becomes an experience akin to being the only sober person in a room full of drunk and stoned exhibitionists who think they’re the funniest people on Earth". Joel Harley of Starburst rated the film 4 stars out of 10, writing that "Like its characters, Bong of the Dead is tiresome, annoying and half-baked."
