= Kerry Anne Mullaney =

Kerry Mullaney is a Scottish film director, writer and producer. She won the 2009 Best Director (Silver Unicorn) award at the 10th Estepona International Horror and Fantasy Film Festival for her 2008 triller/horror film The Dead Outside. She was also nominated for the 2009 BAFTA Scotland awards in the Best Director, Writer and New Work categories. She runs the film production company Mothcatcher along with producer Kris Bird. She was born in Dumfries and is a graduate of Edinburgh College of Art.
