= James Plumb =

American farmer, stockman and state legislator

Member of the Kansas House of Representatives
- In office 1917

Member of the Kansas Senate
- In office 1917–1920

Personal details
- Party: Republican
- Occupation: Farmer, stockman

James R. Plumb was an American farmer, stockman, and state legislator in the state of Kansas. A Republican, he lived in Emporia, Kansas and served in the Kansas Senate from 1917 to 1920. He lived in Emporia and represented Lyon County.

In 1917, he served in the Kansas House of Representatives. He served on the Roads and Buildings; Employees; Livestock; Fish and Game; Agriculture; and Public Buildings committees.
