= David Heavener =

American actor

David Brent Heavener (born December 22, 1953) is an American singer, songwriter, director, actor, composer, producer and writer, specializing in low-budget features and direct-to-video action films.

== Early life ==
David was born on December 22, 1953, in Louisville, Kentucky. He graduated from Durrett High School in Louisville, Kentucky. At the age of 17, he moved to Nashville to pursue his career as a country music singer and songwriter. In the 1970s, he wrote country songs for the Buck Owens television variety show Hee Haw and for the artists Marty Robbins and Billy "Crash" Craddock.

His acted in his first film, The Border of Tong, after Michael Chu, a Chinese B-movie director, found him in 1985. Heavener screenwrote, directed, and starred in the erotic thriller film Angel Blade, which was released in 2002.

== Filmography ==
=== Movies ===
Year	Title	Note
1985	Border of Tong (aka Massacre)	Production Manager, Star
1987	The Fighter	Producer
1988	Outlaw Force	Director, Producer, Star, Writer
1989	Deadly Reactor	Director, Producer, Star, Writer
1990	Kill Crazy	Director, Sound-track Writer, Producer, Star, Writer
1990	Twisted Justice	Director, Producer, Star, Writer
1991	For Hire (aka Lethal Ninja)	Director, Producer, Star, Writer
1991	Ragin' Cajun	Director, Sound-track Writer, Producer, Star, Writer
1991	Prime Target	Director, Producer, Star, Writer
1993	Eye of the Stranger	Director, Sound-track Writer, Producer, Star, Writer
1993	Kill or Be Killed	Producer, Star
1993	L.A. Goddess	Star
1993	Twisted Fate	Star
1995	Dragon Fury	Director, Producer, Star, Writer
1996	Dragon Fury II	Executive Producer
1996	Jurassic Women	Producer, Writer
1996	Out of the Darkness	Star
1996	Fugitive X	Director, Producer, Star, Writer
1996	Vendetta	Executive Producer
1997	Guns of Chupacabra	Star
1997	Hollywood Cops	Star
1997	Kiss the Girls Goodbye (aka Fatal Abduction)	Executive Producer
1999	Atlanta Blue	Director, Producer, Star, Writer
2000	The Catcher	Star
2001	Outlaw Prophet	Director, Producer, Star, Writer
2002	Angel Blade	Director, Producer, Star, Writer
2003	Rock n' Roll Cops 2	Star
2004	Evil Grave: Curse of the Maya (aka Dawn of the Living Dead)	Director, Producer, Star, Writer
2006	Psycho Weene	Director, Producer, Star, Writer
2008	Confessions of an Exorcist	Star
2009	Memphis Rising: Elvis Returns	Star
2011	Legion: The Final Exorcism	Director, Sound-track Writer, Producer, Star, Writer
2020	Drac Von Stoller's Horrifying Tales from the Dead	Director, Producer, Star, Writer
