= Dawn of the Dragons =

1992 gamebook by Joe Dever

- American cover, original release
- Author: Joe Dever
- Illustrator: Brian Williams
- Cover artist: Peter Andrew Jones (UK); Dave Dorman (USA)
- Language: English
- Series: Lone Wolf
- Genre: Fantasy
- Publisher: Red Fox (UK); Berkley / Pacer (USA)
- Publication date: 1992
- Publication place: United Kingdom
- Media type: Print (Paperback)
- ISBN: 0-425-14568-9
- OCLC: 31925463
- Preceded by: The Deathlord of Ixia
- Followed by: Wolf's Bane

Dawn of the Dragons is the eighteenth book of the Lone Wolf book series. As with all of the later Lone Wolf books numbered thirteen through twenty, the North American editions of these books are abridged, with a reduced number of sections. This book does not come with a game map in the American version.

== Gameplay ==
Lone Wolf books rely on a combination of thought and luck. Certain statistics such as combat skill and endurance attributes are determined randomly before play. The player is then allowed to choose Grandmaster Kai disciplines and a selection of Dessi and Crystal Star magics. This number depends directly on how many books in the series have been completed ("Grandmaster rank"). With each additional book completed, the player chooses one additional discipline. The Grandmaster series is different from any in the previous series of books because it gives Lone Wolf spells to use which grow more numerous as his Grandmaster Rank increases.

== Plot ==
Lone Wolf, Kai Grand Master of Sommerlund, has just completed a successful quest when he learns that the Dark God Naar is about to send a large group of fire-breathing dragons against the Kai Monastery. Lone Wolf has to deal with assassins sent to intercept him before he can reach the monastery and lead the new Kai Lords into battle.
