= Meat Market 2 =

2001 film by Brian Clement

- Directed by: Brian Clement
- Written by: Brian Clement
- Starring: Claire Westby; Alison Therriault; Stephan Eng; Terra Thomsen; Rob Nesbitt; Chuck Depape; Dustan Roberts; Dave Krawchuck
- Edited by: Brian Clement
- Music by: Justin Hagberg
- Production company: Frontline Films
- Distributed by: Sub Rosa Studios
- Release date: October 27, 2001
- Running time: 80 minutes
- Country: Canada
- Language: English

Meat Market 2 is a 2001 Canadian horror film directed and written by Brian Clement. It stars Claire Westby, Alison Therriault, and Stephan Eng as zombie hunters who discover a safe haven run by an authoritarian cult leader. It is the sequel to Clement's 2000 film Meat Market and is followed by Meat Market 3.

== Plot ==
Argenta, her vampire friend Nemesis, and a fellow survivor named Ferriden arrive at a safe haven run by Bill Wilhelm, who requires the people he shelters to surrender their freedom. Wilhelm wants to recruit Argenta, but he does not care for her companions. Nemesis is seemingly executed and Ferriden turned over to mad scientists in the compound. When Nemesis returns for vengeance, zombies attack the inhabitants and kill Wilhelm.

== Cast ==
- Claire Westby as Argenta
- Alison Therriault as Nemesis
- Stephen Eng as Ferriden
- Terra Thomsen as Lt. Janet Habsburg
- Rob Nesbitt as Bill Wilhelm
- Chuck Depape as Dr. Gehlen
- Dave Krawchuck as Dr. Hubbard
- Dustan Roberts as The Chef

== Release ==
Sub Rosa Studios released the film in a bundle with Meat Market, the first film, in January 2007.

== Reception ==
Mike Bracken of IGN called the film watchable, especially considering its budget, but he criticized the weak social commentary and slow pacing. Beyond Hollywood wrote that the film panders too much to fans of gore films while ignoring the story. Commenting on the number of zombies and excessive gore, Peter Dendle wrote in The Zombie Movie Encyclopedia that the franchise "traffics in quantity over quality."
