= Blood of the Beast =

- Film poster
- Directed by: Georg Koszulinski
- Written by: Georg Koszulinski
- Produced by: Georg Koszulinski
- Starring: Georg Koszulinski
- Cinematography: Brian White
- Edited by: Georg Koszulinski; Brian White
- Music by: Georg Koszulinski; Steven Landis; Mike Maines
- Production company: Substream Films
- Distributed by: Alpha Video Distributors
- Release date: September 15, 2003
- Running time: 70 minutes
- Country: United States
- Language: English
- Budget: $1500

Blood of the Beast is a 2003 American experimental horror film written, and directed by Georg Koszulinski, who also stars in the film. It focuses on a post-apocalyptic society that depends on cloning, and is overrun by a generation of faulty, homicidal clones.

== Plot ==
Billions of people are killed in World War III, and most of the surviving males are rendered sterile. As a result, humanity resorts to cloning as its primary form of reproduction. All goes well until the first generation of clones turn nineteen and degenerate into bestial killers. The military attempts to contain the threat, but they are unsuccessful. Three groups of survivors who have fled into rural Florida are besieged by the killer clones. Ultimately, Jesse is the last to survive, and the film ends as he is surrounded.

== Cast ==
- Georg Koszulinski as Jesse
- Matt Devine as James
- Sharon Chudnow as Alice
- Joshua Breit as Stevie
- Natalie Sullivan as Julie
- Markeia McCarty as Keia
- Derrick Aguis as the Hiker
- Brian Tamm as John
- Carol Zarzecki as Mae
- Charles Norton as Reverend

== Production ==
Blood of the Beast was shot in Gainesville, Florida. Director Koszulinski was inspired by the French documentaries Blood of the Beasts and Night and Fog, and he used footage from Hiroshima mon amour. Other influences include Nineteen Eighty-Four, Brave New World, Nosferatu, Night of the Living Dead, and I Am Legend. Koszulinski cast himself as the lead when he could not find anyone else willing to commit.

== Release ==
Koszulinski submitted Blood of the Beast to festivals that he knew would not discriminate against its experimental structure. The theatrical premiere was on September 15, 2003, in Gainesville, Florida.

=== Home media ===
The film was released on DVD by Alpha Video on June 22, 2004.

== Reception ==
Eric Campos of Film Threat rated it 3/5 stars and called it a memorable and smart film that is reminiscent of 28 Days Later, but with a fraction of the budget. Kyle Mitchell of The Gainesville Sun wrote, "The classic moral and functional questions of cloning dance quietly beside horror and gore for a truly mind-twisting mix." HorrorNews.Net wrote that the film is too confusing and experimental to enjoy. In The Encyclopedia of Zombie Films, Volume 2, academic Peter Dendle wrote that the film "pretends to be a meditation on technology-gone-awry in a dystopic future but winds up being more of a meditation on pretentiousness."

=== Awards ===
Koszulinski won Best Horror Director at the Rhode Island International Horror Film Festival and Best Emerging Talent at the Dahlonega International Film Festival.
