= Special Dead =

- Directed by: Thomas L. Phillips; Sean Simmons
- Screenplay by: Jared Tweedie
- Story by: Jared Tweedie; Carl Storm
- Produced by: Thomas L. Phillips; Jared Tweedie; Carl Storm; Sean Simmons; Owen Simmons; Jason Brubaker
- Starring: Jason Brubaker; Amy Wade; Gia Natale; Anthony Rutowicz; Haneka Haynes
- Cinematography: Owen Simmons
- Edited by: Thomas L. Phillips
- Music by: Andy Allen; Becky Belsano
- Production companies: Lazy Ghost Films; T-Street Productions
- Release date: October 20, 2006 (HFF)
- Running time: 90 minutes
- Country: United States
- Language: English

Special Dead is a 2006 American zombie comedy film directed by Thomas L. Phillips and Sean Simmons, written by Jared Tweedie, and starring Jason Brubaker, Amy Wade, Gia Natale, Anthony Rutowicz, and Haneka Haynes.

== Plot ==
When a zombie plague infects Camp Special Dude, a dude ranch for the mentally handicapped, a ragtag band of campers and counselors struggle to survive the night. Led by the indifferent nunchuck-wielding head counselor, Mac Stone (Jason Brubaker), and his wheelchair bound sister Dale (Gia Natale), the unlikely heroes fight their way off the mountain as one by one unlucky campers and counselors are picked off and join the ranks of the walking dead.

== Cast ==
- Jason Brubaker as Machiavelli Stone
- Amy Wade as Cassie Hewitt
- Gia Natale as Dale Stone
- Anthony Rutowicz as Todd Slater
- Haneka Haynes as Harley Jacquette

== Release ==
Special Dead premiered at the Hollywood Film Festival on October 20, 2006. It was released on DVD in October 2007.

== Reception ==
Bloody Disgusting rated it 2.5/5 stars and wrote that the execution did not live up to the premise. Eric Campos of Film Threat rated it 3.5/5 stars and called it "a fun, trashy ride". Peter Dendle wrote that it is "back-of-the-schoolbus jabs at the disabled, presented as a veneer over a splatter movie with lousy zombies".
