= Curse of the Maya =

- Directed by: David Heavener
- Written by: David Heavener
- Produced by: David Heavener
- Starring: David Heavener; Amanda Baumann; Joe Estevez; Todd Bridges
- Cinematography: Joseph Rubinstein
- Edited by: Christopher Roth
- Music by: Brett Hinton
- Distributed by: Acteurs Auteurs Associés (AAA)
- Release date: November 3, 2004
- Running time: 90 minutes
- Country: United States
- Language: English

Curse of the Maya (also known as Dawn of the Living Dead and Evil Grave: Curse of the Maya) is a 2004 American horror film written, directed by and starring David Heavener.

== Plot ==
Renee, a former junkie still working out psychological issues, moves to the Mexican border with her doctor fiancé, Jeffrey. They befriend Michael, a local caretaker for the windmills in the area. During dinner at Renee's house, the place comes under siege by ancient Mayan zombies who Michael had killed in the past. The dead orphan connects to Renee who feels the need to solve why the ancient Mayan zombies were killed and how to rest their souls.

== Cast ==
- David Heavener as Michael Richards
- Joe Estevez as Jeffrey Morgan
- Amanda Bauman as Renee Summers
- Andrew Crandall as Mayan Father
- Lauren Aguas as Mother
- Elizabeth Webster as Zombie Daughter
- Robert Aceves as Teenage Boy
- Libertie Heavener as Little Girl
- Todd Bridges as Ruben Herardo

== Production ==
At the time, Heavener lived in the house used for filming. Heavener said that the house was haunted by two ghosts, which caused issues during production.

== Reception ==
Bloody Disgusting rated it 1.5/5 stars and wrote that film fails on every level except for the gore effects and its poster art. Melissa Bostaph of Dread Central rated it 2.5/5 stars and wrote, "[W]hile I can say the movie is bad, it's not so bad as to be unwatchable." Jon Condit, also writing for Dread Central, rated it 1.5/5 stars and wrote, "I found the first 70-minutes to be a bore to sit through and the last twenty to be quite entertaining." Ian Jane of DVD Talk rated it 1.5/5 stars and wrote, "There are plenty of times where low budget films work just fine even with obvious flaws but here, there's nothing to compensate for the cheap looking zombie effects and poorly contrived script." David Johnson of DVD Verdict called it "an enjoyable low-budget, undead comedy romp".
