= Blood of the Beasts =

- Video Cover
- Directed by: Georges Franju
- Written by: Georges Franju
- Produced by: Paul Legros
- Narrated by: Georges Hubert; Nicole Ladmiral
- Cinematography: Marcel Fradetal
- Edited by: André Joseph
- Music by: Joseph Kosma
- Distributed by: The Criterion Collection
- Release date: 1949
- Running time: 22 minutes
- Country: France
- Language: French

Blood of the Beasts (Le Sang des bêtes) is a 1949 short French documentary film written and directed by Georges Franju. It is Franju's first film and is narrated by Georges Hubert and Nicole Ladmiral.

The film is a special feature on The Criterion Collection DVD for Franju's Eyes Without a Face (1960).

== Synopsis ==
Franju's film contrasts peaceful scenes of Parisian suburbia with scenes from a slaughterhouse. The film documents the slaughtering and butchering of horses, cattle, and sheep. The film is narrated without emotive language.

== Production ==
Franju states that he wasn't interested in the subject of slaughterhouses when he decided to make the film, but the location around the building was the Ourcq Canal, allowing him to make a documentary film. Franju stated by using a documentary film format, he was able to use both locations as lyrical counterpoints and "to explain it as a realist while remaining a surrealist by displacing the object in another context. In this new setting, the object rediscovers its quality as an object". The film marked the debut of documentary photographer Patrice Molinard who took stills during the shoot.

Blood of the Beasts was made as a black and white film as an aesthetic. Franju states "If it were in colour, it'd be repulsive... the sensation people get would be a physical one."

== Release ==
Blood of the Beasts had no commercial release outside of Paris.

== Awards ==
- Grand Prix International du Court Sujet 1950

== Notes ==
=== Bibliography ===
- Ince, Kate (2005). Georges Franju. Manchester University Press. ISBN 0-7190-6828-2.
- Grant, Barry Keith (1998). Documenting the Documentary: Close Readings of Documentary Film and Video. Wayne State University Press. ISBN 9780814326398.
