= Zombie Night (2003 film) =

- DVD cover
- Directed by: David J. Francis
- Written by: Amber Lynn Francis; David J. Francis
- Produced by: Amber Lynn Francis; David J. Francis; Mike Masters
- Starring: Danny Ticknovich; Sandra Segovic
- Edited by: Chris Bellio
- Music by: Kevin Eamon; Rich Hamelin; Rodney Lee Nelson; Dan Turcotte; Jeff Vidov
- Distributed by: Primal Films Inc.
- Release date: October 16, 2003
- Running time: 93 minutes
- Country: Canada
- Language: English

Zombie Night is a 2003 Canadian horror film directed by David J. Francis, written by Francis and his wife Amber Lynn Francis, and starring Danny Ticknovich and Sandra Segovic.

== Plot ==
Following the end of World War III, the dead have risen and are eating the living after sunset. A group of survivors are holed up in a building fighting off the undead. One night though, the zombies break through, forcing the group to evacuate. They find themselves running through the woods, trying at all costs to stay alive.

== Cast ==
- Danny Ticknovich as Dave
- Sandra Segovic as Shelley
- Dwayne Moniz as Derek
- Alexiannia Pearson as Becca
- Steve Curtis as Keith
- Andrea Ramolo as Amber
- Amber Lynn Francis as Lesley
- David J. Francis as Man Peeing

== Reception ==
Mike Watt of Film Threat rated the film 3.5 out of 5 and wrote, "It was made with such earnest affection to the genre that it's difficult to be negative towards it." Bloody Disgusting rated it 2/5 stars and criticized the acting and dialogue. Peter Dendle wrote, "Unconvincing actors try to make you think the world is coming to an end by running around abandoned buildings in this anemic offering from Hamilton, Ontario."

== Sequels ==
A sequel was produced, Zombie Night 2: Awakening. There was also a mock documentary, following the film makers as they attempt to make Reel Zombies in a time of real zombies.
