= Zombie Night 2: Awakening =

Zombie Night
- DVD cover
- Directed by: David J. Francis
- Written by: Mike Masters
- Produced by: David J. Francis; Mike Masters
- Starring: Sharon DeWitt; Kari Grace; Dan Rooney
- Cinematography: Robert Scarborough
- Edited by: Chris Bellio
- Music by: Roman Zebik
- Distributed by: Last Call Productions
- Release date: 28 October 2006
- Running time: 90 minutes
- Country: Canada
- Language: English

Zombie Night 2: Awakening is a 2006 Canadian horror film directed by David J. Francis and starring Sharon DeWitt, Kari Grace, and Dan Rooney. It is a conceptual sequel to Zombie Night. It was followed in 2008 by Reel Zombies.

== Premise ==
Mosquitoes spread a zombie plague, and humanity is devastated. Denied shelter with a heavily armed group of survivors, Keith and Shelley attempt to clear out a marina and use it to escape to a better location. Amid attacks by nocturnal zombies, the previous group begin to raid them for supplies.

== Cast ==
- Steve Curtis as Keith
- Sharon DeWitt as Shelley
- Dan Rooney as Basil
- Maria Ibey as Candace
- Kari Grace as Crystal
- Johnny Paris as Derek
- Bob Hillhouse as Pascal
- Nick Smith as Saul
- Lise Moule as Crazy
- Sarah-Jean Villa as Vikki
- Mark Parr as Logan
- Dana McArdle as Eli
- Jessica Pickles as Hailey
- Tony Watt as Jay
- David J. Francis as Father
- Ryan Gallant as Zombie
- John Bell as Andrew
- Corey Clarke as James & Groom Zombie
- Amanda Pauls as zombie with gash across face
- Brendan Mertens as Bug Zombie

== Production ==
Zombie Night 2: Awakening was filmed to the turn of the year in Deseronto, Ontario. The budget was under $100,000.

== Reception ==
Susan Walker of The Toronto Star rated it 1.5/4 stars and wrote that it "might be enough to satisfy a loyal fan base" but is not a good film. Ulises Silva of Quiet Earth rated it 4.5/10 stars and called it "a suspense-less, ineffective zombie film" that could have benefited from a higher budget. Writing in The Zombie Movie Encyclopedia, Volume 2, academic Peter Dendle said, "There are at least a few interesting touches in the zombie conceptualizations here, unlike the depressing and tedious vision in the first feature."
