= The Devil's Daughter (1939 film) =

1939 film

- Directed by: Arthur H. Leonard
- Written by: George Terwilliger (story and screenplay)
- Produced by: Arthur H. Leonard (associate producer); Harry M. Popkin (producer)
- Starring: See below
- Cinematography: Jay Rescher
- Edited by: Samuel Datlowe
- Music by: John Killam
- Release date: December 7, 1939
- Running time: 52 minutes; 67 minutes (original American release)
- Country: US
- Language: English

The Devil's Daughter, also known as Pocomania, is a 1939 American film directed by Arthur H. Leonard.

== Plot summary ==
The movie is set in Jamaica and begins with a group performing a song and then a cockfight.

Sylvia Walton (Ida James) of Harlem inherits a Jamaican banana plantation and returns to manage it. Her disinherited half-sister Isabelle (Nina Mae McKinney), who ran the plantation until their father's death, does not greet her. But Sylvia, her two rival suitors, and her comic-relief servant Percy are disturbed by the constant, growing sound of drums.

Nina Mae McKinney can be heard singing an excerpt of The Devil’s Daughter soundtrack on the album Jamaica Folk Trance Possession 1939-1961.

== Cast ==
- Nina Mae McKinney as Isabelle Walton
- Jack Carter as Philip Ramsay
- Ida James as Sylvia Walton
- Hamtree Harrington as Percy Jackson
- Willa Mae Lang as Elvira
- Emmett 'Babe' Wallace as John Lowden
- Francine Larrimore as Island girl
