= The Dead Outside =

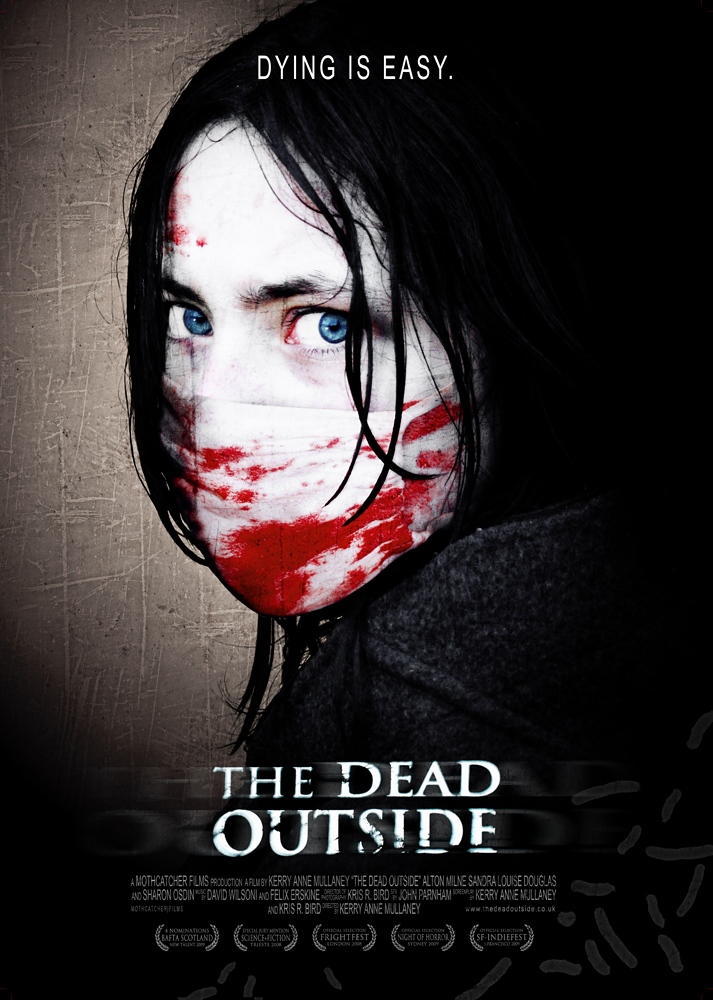
- Original film poster
- Directed by: Kerry Anne Mullaney
- Written by: Kerry Anne Mullaney; Kris R. Bird
- Starring: Alton Milne; Sandra Louise Douglas; Sharon Osdin; Ronbean Mordor
- Release date: 24 August 2008 (Film4 FrightFest)
- Running time: 86 minutes
- Language: English

The Dead Outside is a 2008 Scottish horror/thriller film, the feature debut of director Kerry Anne Mullaney (who also co-wrote the film), produced independently by Mothcatcher Films.

== Synopsis ==
Set in a world devastated by a neurological pandemic, the film focuses on two survivors, April Scott and Daniel, who meet on an isolated farm in Scotland. April is immune to the disease and Daniel tries to get her to see someone about it as she might be the answer to a cure for the disease. April refuses to do so. Another woman, Kate, makes her way to the farm and is allowed to stay for the night. Kate is a nurse and when she understands April's potential value as a cure, she drugs her and attempts to kidnap her and take her back to the medical experts for further study. It is revealed that April had already escaped from a medical lab where experiments had been performed on her. Kate's car crashes and Daniel is able to catch up and help April back to the safety of the farm. Kate becomes infected with the disease and is killed by April when she tries to kill Daniel.

Though ostensibly a zombie film, the film concentrates on the psychological states of the lead characters.

== Production ==
The Dead Outside was filmed in Dumfries & Galloway over 15 days in March 2008.

== Awards and nominations ==
=== Awards ===
- Special Jury Mention at the Festival Internazionale della Fantascienza di Trieste 2008 (aka. Science+Fiction)
- Golden Unicorn for Best Film and the Silver Unicorn for Best Director at the 10th Estepona International Horror and Fantasy Film Festival

=== Nominations ===
- BAFTA Scotland New Talent Awards (2009) in the categories of Best New Work, Director, Producer, and Writer

== Première ==
The Dead Outside premièred at the London FrightFest Film Festival on 25 August 2008.
