= List of films: numbers =

indexed lists of films
0–9	A	B	C	D	E	F
G	H	I	J–K	L	M	N–O
P	Q–R	S	T	U–V–W	X–Y–Z	

This is an alphabetical list of film articles (or sections within articles about films). It includes made for television films. See the talk page for the method of indexing used. It covers film titles that begin with a number, whether written in Arabic numerals or spelled out. Excluding articles (e.g., "a", "an", "the" in English), it does not include film titles containing numbers after the first word.

== In numerical order ==
=== 0 ===
- 00 Schneider – Jagd auf Nihil Baxter (1994)
- Zero (2018)
- Zero Charisma (2013)
- Zero Dark Thirty (2012)
- Zero Day (2003)
- Zero Effect (1998)
- Zero for Conduct (1933)
- Zero Hour! (1957)
- Zero Kelvin (1995)
- Zero Tolerance (1995)

=== Non-integers ===
- .45 (2006)
- 0.5mm (2014)
- Pi (1998)
- Infinity (1996)
- Infinity (2023)

=== 1 ===
- The $1,000,000 Reward (1920)
- One Hundred and One Dalmatians (1961)
- One Hundred Men and a Girl (1937)
- One A.M. (1916)
- One Day (2011)
- One False Move (1992)
- One Fine Day (1996)
- Day One (1989)
- One Flew Over the Cuckoo's Nest (1975)
- One Hour Photo (2002)
- One Million Years B.C. (1966)
- One More Time (1970)
- One Night with the King (2006)
- One Night of Love (1934)
- The 1 Second Film (2007)
- #1 Serial Killer (2013)
- One, Two, Three (1961)
- One Way Passage (1932)
- One Week: (1920 & 2008)
- One of Our Dinosaurs Is Missing (1975)
- 10 (1979)
- The Ten Commandments: The Movie (2016)
- 10 Cloverfield Lane (2016)
- 10 Items or Less (2006)
- Ten Little Indians: (1965 & 1989)
- 10 Rillington Place (1971)
- 10 Rules for Sleeping Around (2013)
- 10 Things I Hate About You (1999)
- 10 to Midnight (1983)
- 10 Years (2011)
- Ten Years (2015)
- 10 Years Later (2010)
- 10,000 BC (2008)
- 100 Bloody Acres (2013)
- 100 Days with Mr. Arrogant (2004)
- 100 Feet (2008)
- 100 Rifles (1969)
- 101 Dalmatians (1996)
- 101 Dalmatians II: Patch's London Adventure (2003)
- 101 Rent Boys (2000)
- 101 Reykjavík (2000)
- 102 Dalmatians (2000)
- 108 Demon Kings (2015)
- 10000 Years Later (2015)
- 10th & Wolf (2006)
- The 10th Kingdom (2000) (TV)
- The 10th Victim (1965)
- 10½ (2010)
- 11-11-11 (2011)
- 11:14 (2003)
- 11M: Terror in Madrid (2022)
- The 11th Hour (2007)
- 12: (2003 & 2007)
- 12 Angry Men: (1957 & 1997)
- 12 Citizens (2014)
- 12 and Holding (2005)
- 12 Hour Shift (2020)
- 12 Men of Christmas (2009) (TV)
- 12 Monkeys (1995)
- 12 Rounds (2009)
- 12 Rounds 2: Reloaded (2013)
- 12 Rounds 3: Lockdown (2015)
- 12 Years a Slave (2013)
- 12 Strong (2018)
- 120 BPM (Beats per Minute) (2017)
- 125 Years Memory (2015)
- 127 Hours (2010)
- 12:01 (1993)
- 12:01 PM (1990)
- 12th & Delaware (2010)
- 13 (2010 & 2022)
- 13th (2016)
- 13 Assassins: (1963 & 2010)
- 13 Beloved (2006)
- Thirteen Days (2000)
- 13 Ghosts (1960)
- Thirteen Ghosts (2001)
- 13 Going on 30 (2004)
- 13 Hours: The Secret Soldiers of Benghazi (2016)
- 13 Moons (2002)
- 13 Rue Madeleine (1947)
- 13 Sins (2014)
- 13 Tzameti (2006)
- The 13th Warrior (1999)
- 137 Shots (2021)
- 14 Peaks: Nothing Is Impossible (2021)
- 1408 (2007)
- 1492: Conquest of Paradise (1992)
- 15 August (2019 film) (2019)
- 15 Minutes (2001)
- 15: The Movie (2003)
- 15 Lads (2011)
- The 15:17 to Paris (2018)
- 16 Blocks (2005)
- 16-Love (2012)
- 16 Wishes (2010)
- 17 Again (2009)
- 1776 (1972)
- 18 Again! (1988)
- 18 Presents (2020)
- 19 (2001)
- #1915House (2018)
- Nineteen Eighty-Four (1984)
- 1900 (1976)
- 1917: (1970 & 2019)
- 1920 series:
  - 1920 (2008)
  - 1920: Evil Returns (2012)
  - 1920: London (2016)
- 1922 (2017)
- 1941 (1979)
- 1968 Tunnel Rats (2009)
- 1982 - A Love Marriage (2016)
- 1984 (1956)
- 1984 (2023)
- 1990: The Bronx Warriors (1983)
- 1991: The Year Punk Broke (1992)
- The One (2001)
- One-Way Ticket to Mombasa (2002)
- The Thirteenth Floor (1999)
- A Thousand Acres (1997)
- A Thousand Clowns (1965)
- A Thousand Words (2012)
- Twelve (2010)

=== 2 ===
- 2 Days in New York (2012)
- 2 Days in Paris (2007)
- 2 Days in the Valley (1996)
- Two Days, One Night (2014)
- The Two Faces of January (2014)
- Two Family House (2002)
- 2 Fast 2 Furious (2003)
- 2 Guns (2013)
- The Two Jakes (1990)
- Two Lovers (2008)
- Two Mules for Sister Sara (1970)
- Two Solitudes (1978)
- Two Thousand Maniacs! (1964)
- Two Weeks Notice (2002)
- Two Women (1960)
- Two for the Money (2005)
- 2 or 3 Things I Know About Her (1967)
- 2 States (2014)
- 20 Dates (1998)
- 20 Feet From Stardom (2013)
- 20 Million Miles to Earth (1957)
- 20th Century Girl (2022)
- 20,000 Leagues Under the Sea: (1907, 1916, 1954, 1997 Hallmark, & 1997 Village Roadshow)
- 20,000 Years in Sing Sing (1932)
- 200 Cigarettes (1999)
- 200 Motels (1971)
- 200 Pounds Beauty (2006)
- 2000 Maniacs (1964)
- 2001 Maniacs (2005)
- 2001 Maniacs: Field of Screams (2010)
- 2001: A Space Odyssey (1968)
- 2001: A Space Travesty (2000)
- 2009: Lost Memories (2002)
- 2010 (1984)
- 2012 (2009)
- 2019, After the Fall of New York (1984)
- 2020 Texas Gladiators (1984)
- 2036: Nexus Dawn (2017 short)
- 2046 (2004)
- 2048: Nowhere to Run (2017 short)
- 2050 (2018)
- 2067 (2020)
- 2081 (2009)
- Twenty-One (1991)
- 21 (2008)
- 21 & Over (2013)
- 21 Grams (2003)
- 21 Jump Street (2012)
- 21 Up (1977)
- 22 Jump Street (2014)
- 23 (1998)
- 23 Blast (2013)
- 23 Paces to Baker Street (1956)
- 24 City (2008)
- 24 Frames (2017)
- 24 Hour Party People (2002)
- 25th Hour (2002)
- 27 Dresses (2008)
- 28 Days (2000)
- 28 Days Later series:
  - 28 Days Later (2002)
  - 28 Weeks Later (2007)
  - 28 Years Later (2025)
  - 28 Years Later: The Bone Temple (2026)
- 28 Hotel Rooms (2012)
- 28 up (1984)
- 29th Street (1991)
- 2:22 (2017)
- 2:37 (2006)

=== 3 ===
- Three Amigos (1986)
- Three Billboards Outside Ebbing, Missouri (2017)
- The Three Burials of Melquiades Estrada (2005)
- Three Coins in the Fountain (1954)
- Three Colors series:
  - Three Colors: Blue (1993)
  - Three Colors: Red (1994)
  - Three Colors: White (1994)
- Three Comrades (1938)
- Three on a Couch (1966)
- Three Days of the Condor (1975)
- 3 Days to Kill (2014)
- 3 Dev Adam (1973)
- The Three Faces of Eve (1957)
- Three Fugitives (1989)
- 3G (2013)
- 3 Godfathers (1948)
- The Three Caballeros (1944)
- Three Godfathers (1936)
- The Three Godfathers (1916)
- Three the Hard Way (1974)
- 3 Idiots (2009)
- Three Kings (1999)
- 3 Little Kungpoo Goats (2022)
- Three on a Match (1932)
- Three Men and a Baby (1987)
- Three Men and a Little Lady (1990)
- Three Mothers (2006)
- The Three Musketeers: (1921, 1933, 1948, 1973, 1992, 1993, 2011, 2023 Part One & 2023 Part Two)
- 3 Ninjas (1992)
- 3 Ninjas Kick Back (1994)
- 3 Ninjas Knuckle Up (1995)
- 3 Ninjas: High Noon at Mega Mountain (1998)
- 3 Ring Circus (1954)
- Three for the Road (1987)
- Three Sisters: (1966, 1970, 1970 Olivier & 1994)
- 3 Strikes (2000)
- Three to Tango (1999)
- 3 Women (1977)
- Three Young Texans (1954)
- 3,2,1... Frankie Go Boom (2012)
- 3-Iron (2004)
- 30 Days of Night (2007)
- 30 Days of Night: Dark Days (2010)
- 30-Love (2017)
- 30 Minutes or Less (2011)
- 300 (2006)
- 300: Rise of an Empire (2014)
- The 300 Spartans (1962)
- 3000 Miles to Graceland (2001)
- 301, 302 (1995)
- 3022 (2019)
- 31 (2016)
- 35 up (1991)
- The 355 (2022)
- 36 Hours (1964)
- 360 (2011)
- The 36th Chamber of Shaolin (1979)
- 36th Precinct (2004)
- The 39 Steps: (1935, 1959, 1978 & 2008 TV)
- 365 Days (2020)
- 365 Days: This Day (2022)
- 3: The Dale Earnhardt Story (2004)
- 3:10 to Yuma: (1957 & 2007)
- The Third Man (1949)
- Thr3e (2007)
- Three (2002)
- Three... Extremes (2004)

=== 4 ===
- Four Brothers (2005)
- Four Christmases (2008)
- Four Daughters (1938)
- 4 Days in May (2011)
- Four Feathers: (1939, 1978 & 2002)
- Four Flies on Grey Velvet (1972)
- The Four Horsemen of the Apocalypse (1962)
- The Four Horsemen of the Apocalypse (1921)
- Four Lions (2010)
- 4 Little Girls (1997)
- 4 Months, 3 Weeks and 2 Days (2007)
- The Four Musketeers (1974)
- Four Rooms (1995)
- The Four Seasons (1981)
- 4 for Texas (1963)
- Four for Venice (1998)
- Four Weddings and a Funeral (1994)
- 4.3.2.1 (2010)
- 40 Days and 40 Nights (2002)
- The 40-Year-Old Virgin (2005)
- The 400 Blows (1959)
- The 41-Year-Old Virgin Who Knocked Up Sarah Marshall and Felt Superbad About It (2010)
- 42 (2013)
- 42 up (1998)
- 42nd Street (1933)
- 44 Inch Chest (2010)
- 44 Minutes: The North Hollywood Shoot-Out (2003)
- 47 Meters Down (2017)
- 47 Meters Down: Uncaged (2019)
- 47 Ronin (2013)
- 48 Hrs. (1982)
- 49th Parallel (1941)
- 4D Man (1959)
- The 4th Floor (2000)
- The Fourth Kind (2009)
- The Fourth Man (1983)
- The Fourth Protocol (1987)

=== 5 ===
- Da 5 Bloods (2020)
- 5 Broken Cameras (2011)
- 5 Card Stud (1968)
- 5 Centimeters per Second (2007)
- 5 Days of War (2011)
- Five Easy Pieces (1970)
- 5 Fingers (1952)
- Five Feet Apart (2019)
- Five Fingers (2006)
- Five Fingers of Death (1973)
- Five Graves to Cairo (1943)
- The Five Man Army (1969)
- Five Minutes of Heaven (2009)
- The Five Senses (1999)
- Five Weeks in a Balloon (1962)
- 50 First Dates (2004)
- The 51st State (2001)
- 52 Pick-Up (1986)
- 54 (1998)
- 55 Days at Peking (1963)
- The Fifth Element (1997)
- 5x2 (2004)
- (500) Days of Summer (2009)
- The 5,000 Fingers of Dr. T. (1953)
- Five Million Years to Earth (1967)
- 50/50 (2011)
- #50Fathers (2015)
- The Five People you Meet in Heaven (2004)
- Five Children and It (2004)

=== 6 ===
- 6 Angels (2002)
- 6 Below: Miracle on the Mountain (2017)
- 6 Days (2017)
- 6 Festivals (2022)
- 6 Underground (2019)
- 6 Souls (2010)
- 61* (2001) (TV)
- The 6th Day (2000)
- The 601st Phone Call (2006)
- 633 Squadron (1964)
- 64: Part I (2016)
- 64: Part II (2016)
- 65 (2023)
- #66 (2015)
- 678 (2010)
- #69 Samskar Colony (2022)
- Ridiculous Six (2015)
- Six Days, Seven Nights (1998)
- Six Degrees of Separation (1993)
- Six Pack (1982)
- Sixteen Candles (1984)
- The Sixth Sense (1999)

=== 7 ===
- The Magnificent Seven (1960, 2016)
- Seven Beauties (1976)
- Seven Brides for Seven Brothers (1954)
- Seven Days in May (1964)
- 7 Faces of Dr. Lao (1964)
- 7 Khoon Maaf (2011)
- Seven Men from Now (1956)
- Seven Pounds (2008)
- Seven Psychopaths (2012)
- Seven Samurai (1954)
- 7 Seconds (2005)
- Seven Swords (2005)
- The Seven Tapes (2012)
- Seven Up! (1964)
- 7 Women (1966)
- The Seven Year Itch (1955)
- Seven Years in Tibet (1997)
- 7:35 in the Morning (2003)
- Seventh Heaven: (1927, 1937 & 1993)
- The Seventh Seal (1957)
- The Seventh Sign (1988)
- Seventh Son (2015)
- The Seventh Victim (1943)
- The 7th Voyage of Sinbad (1958)
- Se7en (1995)
- The Seven-Ups (1973)
- 7½ Phere (2005)
- Snow White and the Seven Dwarfs (1937 film) (1937)

=== 8 ===
- 8 x 10 Tasveer (2009)
- Eight Ball (1992)
- Eight Bells (1935)
- Eight Below (2006)
- Eight Days a Week (1998)
- The Eight Diagram Pole Fighter (1984)
- Eight Girls in a Boat (1932, 1934)
- 8 Heads in a Duffel Bag (1997)
- Eight Hours of Terror (1957)
- Eight Iron Men (1952)
- Eight Legged Freaks (2002)
- Eight Men Out (1988)
- 8 Mile (2002)
- 8 Million Ways to Die (1986)
- Eight Minutes to Midnight: A Portrait of Dr. Helen Caldicott (1981)
- Eight O'Clock Walk (1954)
- Eight on the Lam (1967)
- 8 Ounces (2003)
- 8 Seconds (1994)
- 8 Women (2002)
- Eighth Grade (2018)
- 80 for Brady (2023)
- 84 Charing Cross Road: (1975 TV & 1987)
- 88 Minutes (2008)
- 8: The Mormon Proposition (2010)
- 8mm (1999)
- 8mm 2 (2005)
- 8½ (1963)
- 8½ Women (1999)
- 8000 Miles (2009)
- The Hateful Eight (2015)
- The 8th Night (2021)

=== 9 ===
- 9: (2005 short & 2009)
- Nine (2009)
- Nine Dead (2009)
- 9 Dead Gay Guys (2002)
- 9 to 5 (1980)
- Nine Hours to Rama (1963)
- Nine Lives: (1957, 2002, 2005 & 2016)
- Nine Miles Down (2009)
- Nine Months (1995)
- Nine Queens (2000)
- 9 Songs (2004)
- 9 Souls (2003)
- 9/11 (2002)
- 9012Live (1985)
- 976-EVIL (1989)
- 976-Evil II (1992)
- 9th Company (2005)
- The 9th Life of Louis Drax (2016)
- 9½ Weeks (1986)
- The Nines (2007)
- The Ninth Configuration (1980)
- The Ninth Gate (1999)

== In numerical order (by number value) ==
=== 0–1 ===
- Zero: (1928, 2009, 2010, 2016, 2018 & 2024)
- Zero A. D.: The Birth of Christ (2026)
- Zero Bridge (2008)
- Zero Charisma (2013)
- Zero Contact (2021)
- Zero Dark Thirty (2012)
- Zero Day (2002)
- Zero Days (2016)
- Zero Degree (2015)
- Zero Effect (1998)
- Zero Focus: (1961 & 2009)
- Zero Fucks Given (2021)
- Zero to Hero (2021)
- Zero Hour: (1944 & 1977)
- Zero Hour! (1957)
- The Zero Hour: (1939 & 2010)
- Zero Impunity (2019)
- Zero Kelvin (1995)
- Zero Killed (2012)
- Zero Motivation (2014)
- Zero Patience (1993)
- Zero Point (2014)
- Zero se Restart (2024)
- Zero to Sixty (1978)
- The Zero Theorem (2013)
- Zero Tolerance: (1994, 1999 & 2015)
- Zero Woman series:
  - Zero Woman: Assassin Lovers (1996)
  - Zero Woman: The Accused (1996)
  - Zero Woman: The Hunted (1997)
  - Zero Woman: Dangerous Game (1998)
- 0.0 MHz (2019)
- .45 (2006)
- Zero Point Five Love (2014)
- 0.5 mm (2014)
- One: (2017 & 2021)
- One Against All (1927)
- One A.M. (1916)
- One Angry Man (2010)
- One, But a Lion! (1940)
- One & Done (2016)
- One Flew Over the Cuckoo's Nest (1975)
- One 4 All (1999)
- One Hour Photo (2002)
- One More Time (1970)
- One: The Movie (2005)
- One Night of Love (1934)
- One of Our Dinosaurs Is Missing (1975)
- The 1 Second Film (2007)
- One & Two (2015)
- One 2 Ka 4 (2001)
- One, Two, Many (2008)
- One, Two, Three (1961)
- One Week (1920)
- One Week (2008)
- One-Armed Boxer (1972)
- One-Eyed Jacks (1961)
- One-Eyed Men Are Kings (1974)
- One-Hand Clapping (2001)
- One-Round Hogan (1927)
- One-Thing-at-a-Time O'Day (1919)
- One-Trick Pony (1980)
- One-Two, Soldiers Were Going... (1977)
- One-Way Ticket to Mombasa (2002)
- One-Way to Tomorrow (2020)
- One-Week Bachelors (1982)

=== 2–π ===
- 2 Days in New York (2012)
- 2 Days in Paris (2007)
- 2 Days in the Valley (1996)
- Two Days, One Night (2014)
- 2 Fast 2 Furious (2003)
- Two for the Money (2005)
- The Two Jakes (1990)
- Two Mules for Sister Sara (1970)
- Two Solitudes (1978)
- Two Weeks Notice (2002)
- Two Women (1960)
- The Third Man (1949)
- Three (2002)
- Three... Extremes (2004)
- Three Amigos (1986)
- Three Billboards Outside Ebbing, Missouri (2017)
- The Three Burials of Melquiades Estrada (2005)
- Three Coins in the Fountain (1954)
- Three Colors: Blue (1993)
- Three Colors: Red (1994)
- Three Colors: White (1994)
- Three Comrades (1938)
- Three on a Couch (1966)
- Three Days of the Condor (1975)
- The Three Faces of Eve (1957)
- Three Fugitives (1989)
- Three the Hard Way (1974)
- Three Kings (1999)
- Three on a Match (1932)
- Three Men and a Baby (1987)
- Three Men and a Little Lady (1990)
- The Three Musketeers: (1921, 1933, 1973, 1992 & 1993, 2011, 2023 Part One & 2023 Part Two)
- 3 Ninjas (1992)
- 3 Ring Circus (1954)
- Three for the Road (1987)
- Three Sisters: (1970 Olivier & 1994)
- 3 Strikes (2000)
- Three Young Texans (1954)
- 3, 2, 1... Frankie Go Boom (2012)
- Pi (1998)

=== 4–6 ===
- 4D Man (1959)
- Four Daughters (1938)
- Four Feathers: (1939 & 2002)
- The Four Horsemen of the Apocalypse (1962)
- The Four Horsemen of the Apocalypse (1921)
- 4 Months, 3 Weeks and 2 Days (2007)
- The Four Musketeers (1974)
- Four Rooms (1995)
- The Four Seasons (1981)
- Four Weddings and a Funeral (1994)
- The Fourth Man (1983)
- The Fourth Protocol (1987)
- 5x2 (2004)
- 5 Broken Cameras (2011)
- 5 Card Stud (1968)
- 5 Centimeters Per Second (2007)
- The Fifth Element (1997)
- Five Easy Pieces (1970)
- 5 Fingers (1952)
- 5ive Girls (2006)
- Five Graves to Cairo (1943)
- The Five Man Army (1969)
- Five Minutes of Heaven (2009)
- Five Weeks in a Balloon (1962)
- The 6th Day (2000)
- Six Degrees of Separation (1993)
- Six Days Seven Nights (1998)
- The Sixth Sense (1999)

=== 7–9 ===
- Se7en (1995)
- The Magnificent Seven (1960, 2016)
- Seven Beauties (1976)
- Seven Brides for Seven Brothers (1954)
- Seven Days in May (1964)
- Seven Up! (1964)
- Seven Psychopaths (2012)
- Seven Samurai (1954)
- 7 Women (1966)
- The Seven Year Itch (1955)
- Seventh Heaven: (1927, 1937 & 1993)
- The Seventh Seal (1957)
- The Seventh Sign (1988)
- Seven Years in Tibet (1997)
- 7:35 in the Morning (2003)
- Eight Below (2006)
- Eight Crazy Nights (2002)
- Eight Men Out (1988)
- 8 Women (2002)
- 8 Mile (2002)
- 8 Heads in a Duffel Bag (1997)
- Eight on the Lam (1967)
- Eighth Grade (2018)
- 8: The Mormon Proposition (2010)
- 8-Bit Christmas (2021)
- 8mm (1999)
- 8mm 2 (2005)
- 8½ (1963)
- 8½ Women (1999)
- 9: (2005 short & 2009)
- 9/11 (2002)
- 9½ Weeks (1986)
- The Nines (2007)
- Nine Dead (2009)
- 9 Dead Gay Guys (2002)
- Nine Queens (2000)
- The Ninth Configuration (1980)
- The Ninth Gate (1999)
- The 9th Life of Louis Drax (2016)
- 9 Songs (2004)
- Nine to Five (1980)

=== 10–19 ===
- 10 (1979)
- The Ten (2007)
- 10/31 (2017)
- 10½ (2010)
- 10 Cloverfield Lane (2016)
- The Ten Commandments (1923)
- The Ten Commandments (1956)
- The Ten Commandments (2007)
- The Ten Commandments: The Movie (2016)
- 10 Items or Less (2006)
- Ten Little Indians (1965)
- Ten Little Indians (1989)
- 10 Questions for the Dalai Lama (2006)
- 10 Things I Hate About You (1999)
- The 10th Kingdom (2000) (TV)
- The 10th Victim (1965)
- 10th & Wolf (2006)
- 11'09"01 September 11 (2002)
- 11:14 (2003)
- Twelve (2010)
- 12 (2007)
- 12 and Holding (2006)
- 12 Angry Men (1957)
- The Twelve Chairs (1962)
- The Twelve Chairs (1970)
- The Twelve Chairs (1971)
- The Twelve Chairs (1976)
- 12 Citizens (2014)
- 12 Monkeys (1995)
- 12 O'Clock Boys (2013)
- The Twelve Tasks of Asterix (1976)
- 12 Years A Slave (2013)
- 13 (2010)
- 13th (2016)
- 13 Ghosts (1960)
- 13 Going on 30 (2004)
- The Thirteen Chairs (1969)
- Thirteen Ghosts (2001)
- Thirteen (2003)
- Thirteen Days (2000)
- 13 Hours: The Secret Soldiers of Benghazi (2016)
- 13 Moons (2002)
- Las 13 rosas (2007)
- The 13th Warrior (1999)
- The Thirteenth Floor (1999)
- 15 Minutes (2001)
- 15: The Movie (2003)
- 15 Lads (2011)
- 16 Blocks (2006)
- Sixteen Candles (1984)
- 16 December (2002)
- 16 Wishes (2010)
- 17 Again (2009)
- 18 Again! (1988)
- 18 Bronzemen (1975)
- 19 Months (2002)
- 19 Red Roses (1974)

=== 20–29 ===
- 20 Centimeters (2005)
- 20 Cigarettes (2010)
- 20 Dates (1998)
- 20 Days in Mariupol (2023)
- 20 Feet Below: The Darkness Descending (2013)
- 20 Feet from Stardom (2013)
- 20 Fingers (2004)
- 20 Once Again (2015)
- 20 Weeks (2017)
- 20 Years After (2007)
- Twenty-One (1991)
- 21 (2008)
- 21-87 (1963)
- 21 Bridges (2019)
- 21 Days (1940)
- 21 Grams (2003)
- 21 Hours at Munich (1976 TV)
- 21 Jump Street (2012)
- 21 & Over (2013)
- 21 Up (1977)
- 21 and a Wake-Up (2009)
- 21 Ways to Ruin a Marriage (2013)
- 22 vs. Earth (2021)
- 22 Female Kottayam (2012)
- 22 July (2018)
- 22 Jump Street (2014)
- 22nd of May (2010)
- 23 (1998)
- 23:59 (2011)
- 23:59: The Haunting Hour (2018)
- 23 1/2 Hours' Leave (1919)
- 23 Iravai Moodu (2025)
- 23 Paces to Baker Street (1956)
- 23 People (2019)
- 23 Skidoo (1964)
- 23rd March 1931: Shaheed (2002)
- 24 City (2008)
- 24 Hour Party People (2002)
- 25th Hour (2002)
- 27 (2023)
- 27 Dresses (2008)
- 27 Guns (2018)
- 27 Hours (1986)
- 27, Memory Lane (2014)
- 27 Missing Kisses (2000)
- 27 Nights (2025)
- 27, rue de la Paix (1936)
- 27 Steps of May (2018)
- 28 (2014)
- 28 (2019)
- 28 up (1984)
- 28 Days (2000)
- 28 Hotel Rooms (2012)
- 28 Days Later series:
  - 28 Days Later (2002)
  - 28 Weeks Later (2007)
  - 28 Years Later (2025)
  - 28 Years Later: The Bone Temple (2026)
- 29 (2026)
- 29th Street (1991)

=== 30–39 ===
- -30- (2016)
- 30 Beats (2012)
- 30 Below Zero (1926)
- Thirty Days (1916)
- Thirty Days (1922)
- 30 Days (1999)
- 30 Days (2006)
- 30 Days in Atlanta (2014)
- 30 Days of Night (2007)
- 30 Days of Night: Dark Days (2010)
- 30 Door Key (1991)
- 30 Hari Mencari Cinta (2004)
- 30 Is a Dangerous Age, Cynthia (1968)
- 30 karatów szczęścia (1936)
- 30-Love (2014)
- 30 Miles from Nowhere (2018)
- 30 Minutes or Less (2011)
- 30 Nights of Paranormal Activity with the Devil Inside the Girl with the Dragon Tattoo (2013)
- 30 notti con il mio ex (2025)
- 30 Rojullo Preminchadam Ela (2021)
- Thirty, Single and Fantastic (2016)
- 30 Years Ago (2016)
- 30 Years to Life (1998 TV)
- 30 Years to Life (2001)
- 31 (2016)
- 31 North 62 East (2009)
- 31st October (2016)
- 32 dicembre (1988)
- 33 Giri (2012)
- 33 Postcards (2011)
- 33 Scenes from Life (2008)
- 35 Chinna Katha Kaadu (2024)
- 35 Shots of Rum (2009)
- 35 up (1991)
- The 36th Chamber of Shaolin (1978)
- 36 China Town (2006)
- The 36 Crazy Fists (1977)
- 36 Deadly Styles (1979)
- 36 Farmhouse (2022)
- 36 Fillette (1988)
- 36 Ghanta (2024)
- 36 Ghante (1974)
- 36 Gunn (2022)
- 36 Hours (1953)
- 36 Hours (1964)
- 36 Hours to Kill (1936)
- 36 ore all'inferno (1969)
- 36 Quai des Orfèvres (2004)
- 36 Saints (2013)
- 37 1/2 (2005)
- 37 Seconds (2019)
- 39 Bite Pu (2014)
- 39 East (1920)
- 39 Pounds of Love (2005)
- The 39 Steps (1935)
- The 39 Steps (1959)
- The Thirty Nine Steps (1978)

=== 40–49 ===
- 40 Acres (2024)
- 40 Bands 80 Minutes! (2006)
- Forty Boys and a Song (1941)
- 40 Carats (1973)
- Forty Days and Forty Nights (1953)
- 40 Days and 40 Nights (2002)
- Forty Degrees in the Shade (1967)
- Forty Deuce (1982)
- Forty Guns (1957)
- 40 Guns to Apache Pass (1967)
- Forty Hearts (1931)
- 40-Horse Hawkins (1924)
- 40 Is the New 20 (2009)
- Forty Little Mothers (1936)
- Forty Little Mothers (1940)
- 40 Looks Good on You (2019)
- 40 Pounds of Trouble (1962)
- 40 Quadratmeter Deutschland (1986)
- 40 secondi (2025)
- 40 Skipper Street (1925)
- 40 Sticks (2020)
- The 40-Year-Old Virgin (2005)
- 40 Years of Rocky: The Birth of a Classic (2020)
- 40 Years of Silence: An Indonesian Tragedy (2009)
- 41 (2007)
- The 41-Year-Old Virgin Who Knocked Up Sarah Marshall and Felt Superbad About It (2010)
- 42 (2013)
- 42 up (1998)
- 42nd Street (1933)
- 44 Inch Chest (2009)
- 44 Minutes: The North Hollywood Shoot-Out (2003 TV)
- 45 (2009)
- 45 (2025)
- 45 Calibre Echo (1932)
- 45 Days: The Fight for a Nation (2021)
- 45 Fathers (1937)
- 45 Minutes from Broadway (1920)
- 45 Minutes from Hollywood (1926)
- 45 Minutes to Ramallah (2013)
- 45 Years (2015)
- 47 to 84 (2014)
- 47 Days (2020)
- 47 morto che parla (1950)
- 47 Natkal (1981)
- 47 Ronin (1994)
- 47 Ronin (2013)
- The 47 Ronin (1941)
- 48 Angels (2007)
- 48 Hrs. (1982)
- Forty Eight Hours to Acapulco (1967)
- 48 Hours a Day (2008)
- 48 Hours of Hallucinatory Sex (1987)
- 48 Hours to Live (1959)
- 48 Shades (2006)
- 49th Parallel (1941)
- 49 up (2005)
- 49-O (2015)

=== 50–69 ===
- Fifty (2015)
- Fifty-Fifty (1916)
- Fifty-Fifty (1925)
- Fifty-Fifty (1971)
- 50/50 (1982)
- Fifty/Fifty (1992)
- 50/50 (2011)
- 50/50 (2016)
- 50/50 (2019)
- Fifty Candles (1921)
- 50 Children: The Rescue Mission of Mr. and Mrs. Kraus (2013)
- Fifty Dead Men Walking (2008)
- Fifty Fathoms Deep (1931)
- Fifty Fathoms Deep (1932)
- 50 Feet from Syria (2015)
- 50 First Dates (2004)
- Fifty Roads to Town (1937)
- Fifty Shades series:
  - Fifty Shades of Grey (2015)
  - Fifty Shades Darker (2017)
  - Fifty Shades Freed (2018)
- Fifty Shades of Black (2016)
- 50 Ways to Leave You Lover (2004)
- 50 Ways of Saying Fabulous (2005)
- 50 Years! Of Love? (2008)
- 50 Years Of Silence (1994)
- 51 (2011)
- 51 Degrees North (2014)
- The 51st State (2001)
- 52 Hertz (2020)
- 52 Pick-Up (1986)
- 52 Tuesdays (2014)
- 52 Weeks Make A Year (1955)
- 52Hz, I Love You (2017)
- 52nd Street (1937)
- 53 Days of Winter (2007)
- 54 (1998)
- 55 Steps (2017)
- 56 Rue Pigalle (1949)
- 57 Seconds (2023)
- 58 Seconds (1964)
- 58th (2026)
- Sixty Cents an Hour (1923)
- 60 Cycles (1965)
- Sixty Glorious Years (1938)
- 60 Vayadu Maaniram (2018)
- Sixty Years a Queen (1913)
- 60ml: Last Order (2014)
- 61* (2001) (TV)
- 63 Years On (2008)
- 64: Part I (2016)
- 64: Part II (2016)
- 65 (2023)
- 65, 66 and I (1936)
- 65 Revisited (2007)
- Sixty Six (2006)
- 66/67: Fairplay Is Over (2009)
- 66 Months (2011)
- 66 Scenes from America (1982)
- '68 (1988)
- 68 Pages (2007)
- 69 (2004)
- 69 (2025)
- 69: The Saga of Danny Hernandez (2020)

=== 70–99 ===
- 70 Big Ones (2018)
- 70 Is Just a Number (2021)
- '71 (2014)
- 71: Into the Fire (2010)
- 72 Days (2010)
- 72 Heroes (2011)
- 72 Hours (2024)
- 72 Hours (2026)
- 72 Hours: Martyr Who Never Died (2919)
- 72 Meters (2004)
- 72 Miles (2013)
- 72 Model (2013)
- 72 Tenants of Prosperity (2010)
- 73 Cows (2018)
- No 73, Shanthi Nivasa (2007)
- 75 Watts (2011)
- 76 Days (2020)
- 77 Bullets (2019)
- 77 Heartbreaks (2017)
- 77 Park Lane (1931)
- 77 Rue Chalgrin (1931)
- 78/52 (2017)
- Seventy-Nine (2013)
- 80 Blocks from Tiffany's (1979)
- 80 for Brady (2023)
- 80 Million (2011)
- 80 Million Women Want–? (1913)
- 80 Minutes (2008)
- 80 Steps to Jonah (1969)
- 80s Buildup (2023)
- 83 (2021)
- 84 Charing Cross Road: (1975 TV & 1987)
- 88 (2015)
- 88 Minutes (2007)
- 89mm from Europe (1993)
- 90 Days (1985)
- 90 Degrees in the Shade (1965)
- 90 ML (2019)
- 90 Miles (2001)
- Ninety Minute Stopover (1936)
- Ninety Minutes (1949)
- 90 Minutes in Heaven (2015)
- Ninety Seconds (2012)
- 92 in the Shade (1975)
- 93 Days (2016)
- 95 Miles to Go (2004)
- '96 (2018)
- 96 Hours (2014)
- 96 Minutes (2011)
- 97 Aces Go Places (1997)
- 97 Minutes (2023)
- 99: (1918 & 2009)
- 99 Francs (2007)
- 99 Homes (2014)
- 99 Moons (2022)
- 99%: The Occupy Wall Street Collaborative Film (2013)
- 99-es számú bérkocsi (1918)
- 99.9 (1997)
- 99.9 FM (2005)
- 99 and 44/100% Dead (1974)

=== 100–999 ===
- 100 (2008)
- 100 (2019)
- 100 (2021)
- 100 Awit para kay Stella (2025)
- 100 Bloody Acres (2012)
- 100 Bucks (2012)
- 100 Days (1991)
- 100 Days (2001)
- 100 Days (2013)
- 100 Days to Live (2019)
- 100 Days of Love (2015)
- 100 Days with Mr. Arrogant (2004)
- 100 Degree Celsius (2014)
- 100 Feet (2008)
- 100 Films and a Funeral (2007)
- 100 Ghost Street: The Return of Richard Speck (2012)
- 100 Girls (2000)
- 100 Horsemen (1964)
- 100 Litres of Gold (2024)
- One Hundred Men and a Girl (1937)
- 100 Meters (2016)
- 100 Mile Rule (2002)
- 100 Miles (2007)
- 100% Arabica (1997)
- 100% Love (2011)
- 100% Love (2012)
- 100% Kadhal (2019)
- 100% Wolf (2020)
- 100 Tula para kay Stella (2017)
- 100 Years (2015)
- One Hundred and One Dalmatians (1961)
- 101 Dalmatians (1996)
- 101 Dalmatians II: Patch's London Adventure (2003)
- 101 Reykjavík (2000)
- 102 Dalmatians (2000)
- 108 Demon Kings (2015)
- 120 (2008)
- 120 BPM (Beats per Minute) (2017)
- 122 (2019)
- 125 Years Memory (2015)
- 127 Hours (2010)
- 180 (2011 American)
- 180 (2011 Indian)
- 180° (2010)
- 180° Rule (2020)
- 180 Degrees South: Conquerors of the Useless (2010)
- 200 Cigarettes (1999)
- 200% Wolf (2024)
- 211 (2018)
- 300 (2007)
- 300: Rise of an Empire (2013)
- The 300 Spartans (1962)
- 301, 302 (1995)
- 305 (2008)
- 360 (2011)
- 365 Days (2020)
- 365 Days: This Day (2022)
- The 400 Blows (1959)
- 404 (2011)
- 499 (2020)
- 500 Days of Summer (2009)
- 500 Days in the Wild (2023)
- 500 Dunam on the Moon (2002)
- 500 Miles (TBD)
- 500 Years (2017)
- 500 Years Later (2005)
- 555 (1988)
- 588 rue paradis (1992)
- 600 Miles (2015)
- The 601st Phone Call (2006)
- 633 Squadron (1964)
- 666 the Devil's Child (2014)
- 666 – Traue keinem, mit dem du schläfst! (2002)
- 678 (2010)
- 706 (2019)
- 752 Is Not a Number (2022)
- 777 Charlie (2022)
- 786 Khaidi Premakatha (2005)
- 800 (2023)
- 800 Heroes (1938)
- 800 Two Lap Runners (1994)
- 808 (2015)
- 881 (2007)
- 916 (2012)
- 964 Pinocchio (1991)
- 976-EVIL (1988)
- 976-Evil II (1992)

=== 1000–1999 ===
- A Thousand Acres (1997)
- A Thousand Clowns (1965)
- A Thousand Words (2012)
- 1000 to 1: The Cory Weissman Story (2014)
- 1000 Babies (2024)
- 1000 Miles from Christmas (2021)
- 1000 – Oru Note Paranja Katha (2015)
- 1000 Roses (1994)
- 1000 Thalaivangi Apoorva Chinthamani (1947)
- 1000 Waala (2025)
- 1001 Arabian Nights (1959)
- 1001 Danish Delights (1972)
- 1001 Grams (2014)
- 1001 Nights (1968)
- 1001 Nights (1990)
- 1001 Nunakal (2022)
- 1014 (2019)
- 1040 (2010)
- 1214: No tememos a los cobardes (2021)
- 1341 Frames of Love and War (2022)
- 1400 (2015)
- 1408 (2007)
- 1489 (2023)
- 1492: Conquest of Paradise (1992)
- 1521 (2023)
- 1612 (2007)
- 1770: Ek Sangram (TBD)
- 1776 (1972)
- 1812 (1912)
- 1848 (1949)
- 1857 (1946)
- 1860 (1934)
- 1870 (1971)
- 1871 (1990)
- 1888 (2023)
- 1895: (1995 & 2008)
- 1898, Our Last Men in the Philippines (2016)
- 1900 (1976)
- 1909 (2014)
- 1911 (2011)
- 1914 (1931)
- 1915 (2015)
- 1917 (1970)
- 1917 (2019)
- 1918 (1957)
- 1918 (1985)
- 1919 (1985)
- 1920 series:
  - 1920 (2008)
  - 1920: Evil Returns (2012)
  - 1920 London (2016)
  - 1921 (2018)
  - 1920: Horrors of the Heart (2023)
- 1921: Puzha Muthal Puzha Vare (2022)
- 1922 (1978)
- 1922 (2017)
- 1938: When Mexico Recovered Its Oil (2025)
- 1939 (1989)
- 1941 (1979)
- 1942: A Love Story (1994)
- 1943: Kappaleriya Thamizhan (2023)
- 1944 (2015)
- 1945: (2017 & 2022)
- 1946: The Mistranslation That Shifted Culture (2022)
- 1957: Hati Malaya (2007)
- 1958 (1980)
- 1965 (2015)
- 1968 (2018)
- 1969 (1988)
- 1971 (2007)
- 1971 (2014)
- 1976 (2022)
- 1977 (2009)
- 1978 (2024)
- 1981 (2009)
- 1982 (2013)
- 1982 (2019)
- 1982 (2025)
- 1982 – A Love Marriage (2016)
- 1983 (2014)
- 1984 (1956)
- 1984 (2023)
- Nineteen Eighty-Four (1984)
- 1984, When the Sun Didn't Rise (2018)
- 1985 (2018)
- 1987 (2014)
- 1987: When the Day Comes (2017)
- 1991 (2018)
- 1991: The Year Punk Broke (1992)
- 1992 (2024)
- 1993 (2023)
- 1995 (2024)
- 1996: Pust på meg! (1997)
- 1999 (2009)

=== 2000–infinity ===
- 2000 AD (2000)
- 2000 Maniacs (1964)
- 2001: A Space Odyssey (1968)
- 2001: A Space Travesty (2000)
- 2002 (2001)
- 2006: Varanasi the Untold (unreleased)
- 2009: Lost Memories (2002)
- 2010 (1984)
- 2012 (2009)
- 2012: Doomsday (2008)
- 2012: Kurse a di Xtabai (2012)
- 2012: Supernova (2009)
- 2012/Through the Heart (2022)
- 2012: Time for Change (2010)
- 2016 (2010)
- 2016: Obama's America (2012)
- 2018 (2023)
- 2019, After the Fall of New York (1984)
- 2020 Texas Gladiators (1984)
- 2030 (2014)
- 2030 – Aufstand der Jungen (2010)
- 2033 (2009)
- 2036: Nexus Dawn (2017 short)
- 2036 Origin Unknown (2018)
- 2037 (2022)
- 2040 (2019)
- 2046 (2004)
- 2048: Nowhere to Run (2017 short)
- 2050 (2018)
- 2061: An Exceptional Year (2007)
- 2067 (2020)
- 2073 (2024)
- 2081 (2009)
- 2149: The Aftermath (2016)
- 2307: Winter's Dream (2016)
- 3000 Miles to Graceland (2001)
- 3000 Nights (2015)
- 3022 (2019)
- 3096 Days (2013)
- 3615 code Père Noël (1989)
- The 5,000 Fingers of Dr. T. (1953)
- 5105: The Story of a Mauthausen Escape (2017)
- 6,000 Enemies (1939)
- Ten Thousand Days (1967)
- 10,000 BC (2008)
- 10,000 Black Men Named George (2002 TV)
- 10,000 Hours (2013)
- 10,000 Kids and a Cop (1948)
- 10,000 Miles (2016)
- 10,000 Nights Nowhere (2013)
- 10000 Years Later (2015)
- 20,000 Cheers for the Chain Gang (1933)
- 20,000 Days on Earth (2014)
- 20,000 Eyes (1961)
- 20,000 Leagues Across the Land (1961)
- 20,000 Leagues Under the Sea: (1916, 1954, 1985 TV, 1997 & 1997 TV)
- 20,000 Men a Year (1939)
- 20,000 Species of Bees (2023)
- 20,000 Years in Sing Sing (1932)
- 30,000 Miles Under the Sea (1970)
- 40,000 Years of Dreaming (1997)
- 50,000 Secret Journeys (1994 TV)
- 70,000 Witnesses (1932)
- 80,000 Suspects (1963)
- 100,000 Cobbers (1942)
- 100,000 Pounds (1948)
- 708090 (2016)
- Million Dollar Arm (2014)
- Million Dollar Baby (2004)
- The Million Dollar Duck (1971)
- One Million Years B.C. (1966)
- The $1,000,000 Reward (1920)
- Five Million Years to Earth (1967)
- Sixty Million Dollar Man (1995)
- Millions (2004)
- Two Billion Hearts (1995)
- Billions (1920)
- Infinity (1996)
- Infinity (2023)

Next: List of films: A

== See also ==
- List of film genres
- Lists of actors
- List of film and television directors
- List of documentary films
- List of film production companies
