= Haneda (surname) =

List of surnames

Haneda (written: 羽田 or 羽根田) is a Japanese surname. Notable people with the surname include:

- Erika Haneda (羽田恵理香, born 1973) of the pop group CoCo
- Hiromi Haneda (羽田 裕美; born 1981), Japanese pianist
- Kenji Haneda (羽田 憲司; born 1981), Japanese footballer
- Kentarō Haneda (羽田 健太郎; 1949–2007), Japanese composer and pianist
- Kento Haneda (羽田 健人; born 1997), Japanese footballer
- Masayoshi Haneda (羽田 昌義; born 1976), Japanese actor
- Sumiko Haneda (羽田澄子; born 1926), Japanese film director
- Takuya Haneda (羽根田 卓也; born 1987), Japanese slalom canoeist
- Tomoya Haneda (羽根田 智也), Japanese rugby union player
- Yukiko Haneda (羽根田 征子; born 1966), Japanese singer

== Fictional characters ==
- Kohji Haneda (羽田 浩司), character in the manga series Case Closed (Detective Conan)

== See also ==
- 23504 Haneda, a minor planet named after Toshio Haneda (1910–1992), a Japanese comet hunter
