= Japan Bishōjo Contest =

Japanese beauty contest

The Japan Bishojo Contest (全日本国民的美少女コンテスト) is a beauty contest and audition contest name that has been held every year since 1987 in Oscar Promotion, and is the sister pageant of the Japan Beautiful Girl Contest. When a bishōjo wins the Japanese Girl pageant, the first runner-up becomes Japan Bishojo Contest.

Many of the winners have careers related to popular culture. Miki Fujitani, the 1987 winner, is also a voice actress; she is best known as the voice of Kaoru Kamiya in Rurouni Kenshin. Aiko Sato, the 1992 winner, is an actress known as Kotoko Aihara in the 1996 drama version of Itazura na Kiss. Azusa Yamamoto, the 1997 contestant and favorite to win, is an actress; she is well known as Furabijō in Ninpuu Sentai Hurricaneger. Moeko Matsushita, another 1997 contestant and winner of best multimedia, is an actress and singer. Her most famous role as an actress is Hina Kusaka in Pretty Guardian Sailor Moon. Aya Ueto, another 1997 contestant and winner of the Judges' Special Choice Prize, is an actress; her best roles are as "Azumi" in Azumi and Azumi 2: Death or Love and as "Yoko Misaki" in Attention Please.

== All Time Winners ==
First (1987)
Grand Prix: Miki Fujitani
Special Award: Maiko Yoshida
Music Division: Kyoko Yamamoto
Actor Division: Hitomi Maeda
Model Division: Hiromi Oda

Second (1988)
Grand Prix: Naomi Hosokawa
Actor Division: Noriko Tanaka
Music Division: Kiwako Yoshiwara (Tomomi Harada, Hikaru Kusaka)
Model Division: Kaoru Igarashi
Maintainer:Yuko Anai, Mikiyo Ono, Erika Haneda

Third (1989)
Grand Prix: Mitsuyo Obara
Special Award: Naomi Furukawa
Music Division: Juri Toyoda
Actor Division: Tomomi Hoshino
Model Division: Kaori Takeuchi
Maintainer: Mikako Mootoyama, Junko Muraki

Fourth (1990)
Grand Prix: Akane Oda
Music Division: Akari Sakamoto
Actor Division: Yoko Matsura
Model Division: Asami Ishikawa
Maintainer: Kazumi Murata

Fifth (1991)
Grand Prix: Masami Imamura
Music Division: Megumi Sato
Actor Division: Junko Kurokawa
Model Division: Kayoko Yamamoto
Maintainer: Maria Saito (Nihon TV announcer)

Sixth (1992)
Grand Prix: Aiko Sato
Special Award: Ryoko Yonekura
Music Division: Chizuru Tanaka
Actor Division: Sarina Suzuki
Model Division: Ai Tani
Maintainer: Misato Tanaka
Preference: Kaori Mochida

Seventh (1997)
Grand Prix: Atsuko Sudou
Multimedia: Moeco Matsushita
Actor Division: Manami Hashimoto
Music Division: Mami Nejiki
Special: Aya Ueto and Shinobu Ikehata
Maintainer: Mai Fujiya
Preference: Azusa Yamamoto

Eighth (2002)
Grand Prix*Multi Media (same): Asuka Shibuya
Grand Prix: Mizuho Sakata
Special Award: Ayaka Mita (Ayaka Akai)
Music Division: Yurina Kina
Actor Division: Saya Yamakawa
Model Division: Eri Sakai

Ninth (2003)
Grand Prix*Multi Media (same): Mayuko Kawakita
Special Award: Reina Hoshikawa (Reina Minagawa - TBS announcer)
Music Division: Yuka Honda
Actor Division: Akemi Kimura
Model Division: Arisa Urahama
Gravure: Mikie Hara

Tenth (2004)
Grand Prix: Kurumi Yamauchi
Special Award: Nina Sakai and Natsuki Saitō
Music Division: Aoi Yamazoe
Actor Division: Saki Fukuda
Model Division: Kana Sugiura
Multi Media: Haruna Yahagi
Gravure: Ai Takabe
Variety: Kanako Morikawa

Eleventh (2006)
Grand Prix: Tantan Hayashi
Special Award: Shioli Kutsuna and Rikako Tanaka
Music Division: Not available
Actor Division: Karen Miyazaki
Model Division: Emi Takei
Multi Media: Emi Takei
Gravure: Not available

Twelfth (2009)
Grand Prix*Model Division: Ayano Kudo
Special Award: Saeka Konishi, Ria Tamaki, Kotomi Onaka
Music Division: Risako Togano
Actor Division: Mizuki Satō
Multi Media: Mari Tamashiro
Gravure: Not available

Thirteenth (2012)
Grand Prix : Miyu Yoshimoto and Nanaka Ozawa
Special Award: Manami Igashira and Ichika Osaki
Music Division: Mai Suenaga
Actor Division: Hasumi Shiratori and Koharu Yamaki
Model Division: Ayano Wakayama
Multi Media: Honoka Kaminaguchi
Gravure: Sakura Komoriya

Fourteenth (2014)
Grand Prix : Hikaru Takahashi
Special Award: Moe Fujie and Yūka Takamura
Music Division: Natsumi Hanaoka
Actor Division: Hikaru Kadogaki and Yurina Kawaguchi
Model Division: Rubiner Maya and Risa Kikukawa
Multi Media: Mika Iijima
Gravure: Shiori Inuzuka

Fifteenth (2017)
Grand Prix: Ayaka Imoto
Special Award: Shiori Tamada, Karuoko Ishii
Multimedia Award: Nanakai Takeuchimi
Gravure: Ruri Kinoshita
Music Division: Sakura Fujita, Kaoru Megumi
Actor Division: Ayaka Itami
Model Division: Momoka Taniguchi
Finalist: Tamao Yamamoto, Marie Morimoto
