= 1982 (disambiguation) =

1982 was a common year starting on Friday of the Gregorian calendar.

1982 may also refer to:

== Events ==
- 1982 in film
- 1982 in music
- 1982 Lebanon War
- 1982 Commonwealth Games
- 1982 NFL season

== Books ==
- 1982 (book), a memoir written by Canadian radio personality Jian Ghomeshi

== Film ==
- 1982 (2013 film), an American film directed by Tommy Oliver
- 1982 (2019 film), a Lebanese film directed by Oualid Mouaness
- 1982 (2025 film), a Peruvian film directed by García JC
- 1982 – A Love Marriage, a 2016 Indian film

== Music ==
- 1982 (group), an American hip-hop duo composed of producer Statik Selektah and rapper Termanology
  - 1982 (Statik Selektah and Termanology album)
- 1+9+8+2, also known as 1982, an album by rock band Status Quo
- 1982, a 1996 album by Lithuanian rock band Foje
- "1982" (Randy Travis song)
- "1982" (Miss Kittin & The Hacker song)
