= Maiko (given name) =

- Gender: female
- Language: Japanese

Origin
- Origin: Japanese
- Meaning: 舞子(Mai+Ko)= Dancing girl 摩衣子(Ma+I+Ko)=Polished garment child 麻衣子(Ma+I+Ko)=Linen robe child 牧子(Maki+Lo)= Pasture Child

Maiko (written as 舞子, 摩衣子, 麻衣子, 牧子) is a female Japanese given name. Notable people with the name include:

- Maiko Fujino (藤野 舞子; born 1983), Japanese swimmer
- Maiko Gogoladze (born 1991), Georgian long jumper
- Maiko Hashida (橋田 舞子; born 2000), Japanese water polo player
- Maiko Inoue (井上 摩衣子; born 1979), Japanese tennis player
- Maiko Itai (板井 麻衣子; born 1984), Miss Japan Universe 2010
- Maiko Itō (いとう まい子, born 1964), Japanese actress
- Maiko Iuchi (井内 舞子), Japanese composer and arranger
- Maiko Jeong Shun Lee, Viscountess Rothermere (born 1949), British viscountess
- Maiko Kano (狩野 舞子; born 1988), Japanese volleyball player
- Maiko Kawakami (川上 麻衣子; born 1966), Japanese actress
- Maiko Kazama (風間 舞子; born 1956), Japanese actress
- Maiko Morio (森尾 麻衣子; born 1967), Japanese gymnast
- Maiko Nakamura (中村 舞子; born 1991), Japanese singer
- Maiko Nakaoka (中岡 麻衣子; born 1985), Japanese women's footballer
- Maiko Nasu (那須 麻衣子; born 1984), Japanese former footballer
- Maiko Obikawa (帯川 牧子; born 1973), Japanese ice hockey player
- Maiko Sakae (栄 舞子; born 1986), Japanese musician
- Maiko Sato (佐藤 麻衣子; born 1978), Japanese sailor
- Maiko Tajima (田島 麻衣子; born 1976), Japanese politician
- Maiko Tōno (遠野 舞子; born 1973), Japanese actress
- Maiko Watson, member of the Canadian pop group Sugar Jones
- Maiko Zulu, Zambian musician

== Fictional characters ==
- Maiko (マイコ), a secondary character in the manga series Girls und Panzer
- Maiko Ayasato (綾里 舞子) (Misty Fey), a character in the Ace Attorney franchise
- Maiko Kaji (梶 舞子), a supporting character in the manga and anime series Hataraki Man
- Maico Katou (マイコ・カトウ, Maiko Katō), a character in the manga series Yu-Gi-Oh! R
- Maiko Kurashiki (倉敷 舞子), a character in the game series Cinderella Nine
- Maiko Ōgure (大暮 麻衣子), a character in the anime series Kill la Kill
- Maiko Tokishima (時島まいこ), a character in the mobile game Bleach Mirrors High
