= Tachihara =

Tachihara is a surname, Notable people with the surname include:

- Mai Tachihara (fl. 1995), Japanese actress
- Masaaki Tachihara (1926-1980), Japanese essayist and poet
- Michizō Tachihara (1914-1939), Japanese poet and architect
