= Ring (1995 film) =

1995 Japanese horror television film

- VHS cover art

Japanese name
- Kanji: リング
Transcriptions
- Revised Hepburn: Ringu
- Based on: Ring by Koji Suzuki
- Screenplay by: Joji Iida
- Directed by: Chisui Takigawa
- Starring: Katsunori Takahashi; Ayane Miura; Yoshio Harada; Akiko Hinagata
- Composer: Yoshihiro Ike
- Country of origin: Japan
- Original language: Japanese

Production
- Cinematography: Iwata Kazumi
- Running time: 95 minutes

Original release
- Release: August 11, 1995

Ring (Japanese: リング, Hepburn: Ringu) is a 1995 Japanese horror television film based on the novel of the same title by Koji Suzuki. In comparison to the subsequent theatrical films and television series based on the novel, it is the most accurate in relation to the original text.

== Plot ==
Four apparently healthy young people, including reporter Kazuyuki Asakawa's niece Tomoko Ōishi, die suddenly at exactly the same time. Investigating the deaths, Asakawa discovers that the four had stayed together at a resort one week earlier. At the resort he finds and watches an unlabelled videotape containing a series of disturbing images. The recording ends with a warning that whoever watches it will die seven days later and begins to give instructions for avoiding death, but the remainder of the message has been erased.

Convinced that the threat may be genuine, Asakawa seeks the help of Ryūji Takayama, a university professor who researches extrasensory perception. The two men have a troubled history: Takayama was once suspected of killing his wife, while Asakawa damaged his own career by publicly defending him. Takayama watches the tape and asks Asakawa to make him a copy so that he can study it.

Asakawa and Takayama trace images on the videotape to psychic Shizuko Yamamura and travel to Izu Ōshima, where they learn about her daughter, Sadako Yamamura. Shizuko possessed psychic abilities and was publicly exploited by researcher Heihachirō Ikuma before eventually taking her own life. Sadako inherited even greater powers and later disappeared. Meanwhile, Asakawa discovers that his pregnant wife Shizuka has accidentally watched the cursed tape, giving him another reason to solve the mystery.

Their investigation eventually leads them to Jōtarō Nagao, who confesses that he assaulted Sadako and, after she used her psychic powers against him, threw her into a well. Asakawa and Takayama realise that the resort where the videotape appeared was constructed above the site of Sadako's death. They recover her remains from the well and believe that laying her to rest has broken the curse. Asakawa survives his own seven-day deadline.

Takayama, however, subsequently dies when his deadline arrives. Asakawa realises that the recovery of Sadako's body did not save him: he survived because he had copied the videotape and caused Takayama to watch it. The missing portion of the recording had instructed viewers to escape the curse by making a copy and showing it to another person, perpetuating Sadako's vengeance. Faced with his wife's impending death, Asakawa resolves to have her pass the tape to another victim, recognising that the curse will continue in an unbroken "ring".

== Cast ==
- Katsunori Takahashi as Kazuyuki Asakawa
- Yoshio Harada as Ryūji Takayama
- Ayane Miura as Sadako Yamamura
- Kyōko Dōnowaki as Shizuko Yamamura
- Mai Tachihara as Shizuka Asakawa
- Akiko Hinagata as Tomoko Ōishi
- Maha Hamada as Mai Takano
- Tomorowo Taguchi as Jōtarō Nagao
- Tadayoshi Ueda as Takashi Yamamura

== Development ==
Ring was produced for Fuji Television's Friday Entertainment programming block, adapting Koji Suzuki's 1991 novel of the same name. The television film was directed by Chisui Takigawa and produced by Noriyasu Ueki, with a screenplay credited to Jōji Iida and Taizō Soshigaya.

The adaptation retained the novel's male protagonist, journalist Kazuyuki Asakawa, played by Katsunori Takahashi, rather than introducing the female protagonist subsequently used in the 1998 theatrical adaptation. The screenplay also altered the characterisation of Ryūji Takayama, played by Yoshio Harada, giving him a backstory involving suspicion over his wife's death. While retaining much of Sadako Yamamura's original history, the television adaptation reduced some of the novel's scientific explanations to accommodate its running time.

Former Fuji Television producer Shinya Kawai later recalled that the television film had been overseen by a colleague in the network's programming department. Writing in 2024, Kawai remembered the adaptation receiving favourable audience ratings and stated that he had enjoyed watching it.

== Release ==
Ring was broadcast on Fuji TV on 11 August 1995 as part of the network's Friday Entertainment programming block, airing from 9:02 p.m. to 10:52 p.m. Its broadcast subtitle was "Accident or Sudden Death? The Grudge of a Girl Who Takes Four Lives" (事故か！変死か！4つの命を奪う少女の怨念).

An expanded home-video edition titled Ring: Kanzenban was released in Japan on 24 November 1995. The version restored material that could not be included in the television broadcast, including additional violent and sexual content. A LaserDisc edition followed on 26 July 1996.

== Legacy ==
The film was the first screen adaptation of Suzuki's Ring and was later overshadowed internationally by Nakata's 1998 theatrical film and its subsequent remakes. Writing retrospectively for Bloody Disgusting in 2025, Paul Lê described the television adaptation as considerably more faithful to the novel than the later films, particularly in its depiction of Kazuyuki Asakawa, Ryūji Takayama and Sadako's background. He also noted that the production retained a greater balance between the story's scientific and supernatural elements, although the novel's more extensive scientific material was reduced for television.

The television adaptation subsequently influenced the development of Hideo Nakata's 1998 theatrical film. According to producer Shinya Kawai, fellow producer Takenori Sento was dissatisfied with the 1995 adaptation and sought to develop a new film that better reflected his interpretation of Suzuki's novel. Sento's enthusiasm helped lead to the production of the 1998 adaptation.
