= Aiko Satō (actress) =

Japanese actress (born 1977)

- 佐藤 藍子
- Born: September 26, 1977 (age 48); Kawasaki, Kanagawa, Japan
- Education: Hiji Women Gakuen High School
- Occupations: Actress, tarento
- Years active: 1993–present
- Agent: Oscar Promotion
- Spouse: Takuma Numata (m. 2007)

Aiko Satō (佐藤 藍子, Satō Aiko; born 26 September 1977) is a Japanese actress and tarento.

== Biography ==
=== Career ===
Satō was born in Kawasaki, Kanagawa, Japan and graduated from Hiji Women Gakuen High School.

She won the 6th Japan Bishōjo Contest Grand Prize with Ryoko Yonekura in 1992. Despite sluggish in her debut, Satō co-starred in Seifuku Kojo Iinkai unit Icebox for a period of time. In 1996 she played a male character in the drama Hen.

=== Personality ===
Satō had a wide range of activities, such as presenting the Fuji Television series Unbelievable and playing a nurse in the NHK asadora Chura-san, and had the same level of popularity with the Japan Bishōjo Contest Grand Prize winner Yonekura.

=== Private life ===
Her husband, Takuma Numata is a riding instructor. He knew her when she was in a riding club, and during her 30th birthday on 26 September 2007, Satō later announced that she married him.

== Filmography ==
=== Films ===
Year	Title	Role	Notes	Ref.
2024	The Dancing Okami			

=== TV dramas ===
Year	Title	Role	Notes	Ref.
2001	Churasan	Nanako Sasaki	Asadora	
2008	Atsuhime	Onojima	Taiga drama	

=== Japanese dub ===
Year	Title	Role	Notes	Ref.
1999	The Lion King II: Simba's Pride	Kiara		
