= Zero Woman: Dangerous Game =

- Official U.S. DVD Cover, released by Central Park Media on March 9, 2004.
- Directed by: Hidekazu Takahara; Yasunori Nishi (Assistant Director)
- Screenplay by: Miyuki Takahashi; Takashi Kaneda; Hidekazu Takahara
- Based on: Zero Woman by Tohru Shinohara
- Produced by: Shinsuke Yamazaki; Yasushi Enomoto; Tomoko Hojo; Shunji Sakaki
- Starring: Chieko Shiratori
- Music by: Kentaro Nojima
- Production company: Vision Sugimoto
- Distributed by: MAXAM (Japan); Central Park Media (USA)
- Release date: May 1, 1998 (Japan)
- Running time: 79 minutes
- Country: Japan
- Language: Japanese

Zero Woman: Dangerous Game (Zero WOMAN 危ない遊戯, Zero Woman: Abunai yūgi) is a 1998 V-Cinema erotic thriller film starring Chieko Shiratori. It is the sixth installment of the Zero Woman film series.

== Plot ==
Rei, a woman without a past or identity, is an undercover agent for the Zero Department, a deadly underground division of the Japanese police force. Someone has been slaughtering innocent people for the medical black market. Rei is assigned to kill the mysterious criminal, and her only lead is a mistress of a large criminal boss, who is seducing Rei.

== Cast ==
- Chieko Shiratori as Rei
- Ichiho Matsuda as Nana
- Terunori Miyazaki as Natsume
- Ken Miyawaki as Yamaguchi
- Daisuke Ryu as Mutoh
- Masayoshi Nogami as Kaneda
- Shira Shitamoto as Kirishima
- Keizo Nagashima as Tanabe
- Tadashi Okuno as Satake
- Satoshi Furukawa
- Mitsuyoshi Nakamura
- Masami Tachi

=== English dub cast ===
- Suzy Prue as Rei
- Pink Champale as Nana
- J.K. Ellemeno as Natsume
- Rodd Stone as Yamaguchi
- Ted as Mutoh
- Tristan Goddard as Kaneda
- Fergus Lawless as Kirishima
- Scott Cargle as Tanabe
- Chunky Mon as Satake
- Jonathan Boggs
- Jeff Gimble
- Skooter Larue

== Release ==
The film was released direct-to-video on May 1, 1998, in Japan. The DVD version was released on November 24, 2000. Central Park Media licensed the film under their Asia Pulp Cinema label. The film was released on subtitled VHS on February 13, 2001. CPM later released the film on DVD with an English dub on March 9, 2004. The English dub was produced by Mercury Productions in New York City.

== See also ==
- Girls with guns
- Zero Woman, for other films in the franchise
