= Ayane Miura =

Japanese actress (born 1974)

- Born: May 8, 1974 (age 51); Shizuoka Prefecture, Japan
- Modeling information
- Height: 1.58 m (5 ft 2 in)

Ayane Miura (三浦綺音, Miura Ayane) (born May 8, 1974) is a Japanese model, singer, actress. As an actress she portrayed Sadako Yamamura in the 1995 Japanese TV film Ring.

Miura has appeared in several V-Cinema films. In 1996 she appeared in an entry in the popular Rapeman series. Miura's episode, The Rape-Man of Edo takes the concept of the series into samurai milieu.

== Partial filmography ==
- 1993.08.27 ネオ極道伝 KIZA (KSS)
- 1994.01.14 新百合族 先生、キスしたことありますか？ (Nikkatsu Video)
- 1994.01.29 凶銃ルガーPO8 (Excellent Films)
- 1994.04.28 新百合族2 (Nikkatsu Video)
- 1994.06.24 ツッパリ・ハイ・スクール 武闘派高校伝 (KSS)
- 1995.06.09 新百合族3 (Nikkatsu Video)
- 1995.06.23 NINE－ONE くノ一妖獣伝説 (Nain-wan: Kunoichi yôjuu densetsu) (JVD)
- 1995.10.20 双頭の悪魔 (Pony Canyon)
- 1995.12.01 教科書にないッ！ (Pink Pineapple)
- 1996.05.10 痴漢日記3 尻を撫でまわしつづけた男 (Toei Video)
- 1996.06.28 監禁逃亡 恥辱の令嬢 (SEN)
- 1996.11.01 The Rape-Man of Edo 2 (大江戸レイプマン 女淫処刑人, Ôedo Reipuman: Nyoin shokeinin) (Gyaga Communications)

== Photobooks (partial list) ==
- 1994-05-10 Naked Dance (裸舞, Rabu)
- 1995-01-10 Reve

== Sources ==
- 三浦綺音 (in Japanese). Japanese Movie Database.
- "Ayane Miura 三浦綺音". Urabon Navigator 1997–2006.
