= Azusa Senou =

Japanese singer, actress and model

Azusa Senou 瀬能 あづさ
- Born: April 3, 1973 (age 53); Atsugi, Kanagawa, Japan
- Genre: J-pop
- Occupations: Occasional actress, singer, model
- Years active: 1989–1996
- Label: Pony Canyon
- Formerly of: CoCo

Azusa Senou (瀬能 あづさ, Senō Azusa; born April 3, 1973), is a Japanese singer, actress and model. She has been a former member of Japan's idol group Coco in the late 1980s.

== Biography ==
Azusa was born in Atsugi, Kanagawa, Japan, and made her solo debut on 4 September 1991. She was a founding member of Coco, though she left in 1992. She has since retired from the entertainment business.

== Discography ==
=== Singles ===
- Mou Nakanaide (もう泣かないで)
  - Released: September 4, 1991
  - Oricon number 5
- Mitsumete itemo (見つめていても)
  - Released: January 15, 1992
  - Oricon number 10
- Kimi no tsubasa ~daijoubu dakara~ (君の翼～だいじょうぶだから～)
  - Released: June 3, 1992
  - Oricon number 8
- Anata Janakereba (あなたじゃなければ)
  - Released: October 21, 1992
  - Oricon number 14
- I miss you
  - Released: February 19, 1993
  - Oricon number 27
- Shitsuren (失恋カフェ)
  - Released: June 18, 1993
  - Oricon number 29
- Aki (秋)
  - Released: October 21, 1993
  - Oricon number 30

=== Albums ===
- 21 August 1992: Crystal Eyes [PCCA-00388] Oricon number 6
- 21 July 1993: Horizon [PCCA-00468] Oricon number 29

== Picture books ==
- 2 October 1991: Yokan
- 25 October 1992: Liberty
