= Zero Woman: The Hunted =

- Official U.S. DVD Cover, released by Central Park Media on November 11, 2003.
- Directed by: Norihisa Yoshimura
- Screenplay by: Takefumi Ota; Akiko Yamaga; Norihisa Yoshimura
- Based on: Zero Woman by Tohru Shinohara
- Produced by: Shinsuke Yamazaki; Yasushi Enomoto; Tomoko Hojo
- Starring: Mikiyo Ohno
- Cinematography: Hiroshi Takase
- Music by: Takahashi Nakagawa
- Production company: Vision Sugimoto
- Distributed by: MAXAM
- Release date: May 12, 1997 (Japan)
- Running time: 79 minutes
- Country: Japan
- Language: Japanese

Zero Woman: The Hunted (Zero WOMAN 消せない記憶, Zero Woman: Kesenai kioku) is a 1997 V-Cinema erotic thriller film starring Mikiyo Ohno. It is the fifth installment of the Zero Woman film series.

== Plot ==
Rei, an undercover assassin for the Zero Department, has been targeted by a rival organization.

== Cast ==
=== Japanese cast ===
- Mikiyo Ohno as Rei
- Reina Tanaka as Naomi
- Ko Watanabe as Shiina
- Daisuke Ryu as Muto
- Kazuki Nagasawa as Gohara
- Yoshiaki Fujiwara as Yamamoto
- Daisuke Ikeda
- Norio Ishikawa
- Junji Tanaka
- Minoru Tanaka
- Katsumi Usuda
- Viktor Krüger as Yakusa bodyguard

=== English voice cast ===
- Carol Jacobanis as Rei
- Lynna Dunham as Naomi
- Buddy Woodward as Shiina
- Jonathan D. Boggs as Muto
- Tristan Goddard as Gohara
- Chris Winston as Yamamoto

== Release ==
The film was released direct-to-video on May 5, 1997 on VHS by Maxam. The DVD version was released on November 24, 2000. Central Park Media released the film under their Asia Pulp Cinema label on November 11, 2003 with both Japanese and English audio and English subtitles. The English dub was produced by Central Park Media and was recorded at Audioworks Producers Group in New York City.

== See also ==
- Girls with guns
- Zero Woman, for a list of other films in the series.
