= Lívia Gyarmathy =

Hungarian film director (1932–2022)

- Born: 8 January 1932; Budapest, Hungary
- Died: 25 May 2022 (aged 90)
- Occupations: Film director Screenwriter
- Years active: 1962–2022

Lívia Gyarmathy (8 January 1932 – 25 May 2022) was a Hungarian film director and screenwriter. She has directed over 20 films since 1962. She was a member of the jury at the 40th Berlin International Film Festival. Her graduate thesis film is the noted documentary 58 Seconds.

== Filmography ==
- 1964: (Fifty-eight) 58 Seconds / Ötvennyolc másodperc (d)
- 1968: Message / Üzenet (d)
- 1969: Do You Know "Sunday-Monday"? / Ismeri a szandi mandit?
- 1972: Dear Address / Tisztelt Cím! (d)
- 1973: Wait a Sec! / Álljon meg a menet
- 1976: The Lonely Persons' Club / Magányosok klubja (d)
- 1977: Ninth Floor / Kilencedik emelet (d)
- 1979: Every Wednesday / Minden szerdán
- 1979: Koportos / Koportos
- 1982: Coexistence / Együttélés (d)
- 1984: Now It's My Turn, Now It's Yours / Egy kicsit én... egy kicsit te
- 1986: Blind Endeavour / Vakvilágban
- 1987: Poet George Faludy / Faludy György költõ (d) (with Géza Böszörményi)
- 1988: Recsk, the Hungarian Goulag / Recsk 1950-1953. Egy titkos kényszermunkatábor története (d) (with Géza Böszörményi)
- 1991: Where Tiranny Prevails / ...hol zsarnokság van... (d) (with Géza Böszörményi)
- 1992: The Rapture of Deceit / A csalás gyönyöre
- 1995: The Stairs / A lépcsõ (d)
- 1996: Escape / Szökés
- 1998: Our Stork / A mi gólyánk (d)
- 2003: Ballroom Dancing / Táncrend (d)
- 2008: Little Fish... Big Fish... / Kishalak... Nagyhalak (d)
- 2013: The Square / A tér (d)
