= Saori Ono =

Japanese model and actress (born 1975)

Saori Ono (小野 砂織, Ono Saori) (born 1975 in Sendai, Miyagi) is a Japanese model and actress.

== Life and career ==
Ono began her career as a fashion and gravure model and was featured as the 1997 Asahi Kasei swimsuit Campaign Model.

In 1998, she starred in the erotic action-thriller V-cinema production Zero Woman Returns, part of the long-running "Zero Woman" series. A year later she appeared in the yakuza film Chaka 2 (チャカ２) which was released in July 1999. Ono also had a featured role in the January 2002 drama Gin no otoko: Roppongi host densetsu (銀の男 六本木伝説). She was also a regular on the TBS variety show Wonderful (ワンダフル, Wandafuru) which was broadcast from 1998 to 2002.

She left the entertainment field in 2002 to pursue a business career as an esthetician.

== Filmography ==
- Zero Woman: Saigo no shirei (1998 aka Zero Woman Returns) - V-cinema
- Chaka 2 (チャカ２) (1999)
- Kyū no Ichi Kinyūdō (九ノ一金融道) (2000)
- Gin no otoko: Roppongi host densetsu (銀の男 六本木伝説) (2002)
