= Zero Woman: The Accused =

- Official U.S. DVD Cover released by Asia Pulp Cinema on
- Directed by: Daisuke Goto
- Written by: Yuka Honcho
- Based on: Zero Woman by Tohru Shinohara
- Produced by: Masaaki Yokouchi; Hideo Sugimoto; Shinsuke Yamazaki; Tomoko Hojo
- Starring: Mai Tachihara
- Music by: Takashi Nakayama
- Production company: Vision Sugimoto
- Distributed by: MAXAM
- Release date: April 4, 1997 (Japan)
- Running time: 79 minutes
- Country: Japan
- Language: Japanese

Zero Woman: The Accused (Zero WOMAN 名前のない女, Zero Woman: Namae no nai onna) is a 1997 V-Cinema erotic thriller film, starring Mai Tachihara. It is the fourth installment in the Zero Woman film series.

== Plot synopsis ==
Rei, an undercover agent for the Zero Department, is on a mission to investigate the multiple murders of men. While out, she meets Mitsuru, a male prostitute. Rei decides to have him live with her. But Rei is suspicious of Mitsuru's behavior and wonders if he is involved with the murders.

== Cast ==
=== Japanese cast ===
- Mai Tachihara as Rei
- Yûjin Kitagawa as Mitsuru
- Shinji Yamashita as Muto
- Ayana Inoue as Reiko Sato
- Eini Oshiro as Detective
- Daisuke Yamazaki as Bar Patron
- Reiko Kojima
- Eisaku Shindo
- Hajime Tsukumo
- Tetsu Watanabe

=== English voice cast ===
- Marcia Belle as Rei
- Michael Tremain as Mitsuru
- Matthew Jay as Muto
- Kandi Snackwell as Reiko Sato
- Tom Wilson as Detective
- Paul Hertel as Bar Patron

== Release ==
The film was released direct-to-video on April 4, 1997 in Japan. It was later re-released on DVD on November 11, 2000. Central Park Media licensed the film under their Asia Pulp Cinema label and was released on VHS on June 24, 2000 as an edited version and unedited VHS was released on April 10, 2001 . The film was re-released on DVD on May 13, 2003 with an English dub. The dub was produced by Matlin Recording in New York City.

== See also ==
- Girls with guns
- Zero Woman, for other films in the franchise
