= Naoko Iijima =

Japanese actress

- 飯島直子
- Born: February 29, 1968 (age 58); Yokohama, Japan
- Occupation: Actress
- Years active: 1988–present
- Spouses: Nobuteru Maeda (m. 1997; div. 2001) unknown (m. 2012; div. 2021)

Naoko Iijima (飯島直子, Iijima Naoko) is a Japanese television and film actress and a former gravure idol who was born on February 29, 1968, in Kōhoku-ku, a ward of the city of Yokohama in Kanagawa Prefecture, Japan.

== Life and career ==
=== Early career - Zero Woman ===
Iijima began her entertainment career in 1988 on the late night Japanese TV show 11 PM, followed by a number of appearances in commercials and as a Race Queen. An early cinema role was the December 1990 straight-to-video V-cinema drama Strawberry Times 4: Kisaragi San Shimai no Gyakushū (ストロベリータイムス４ 如月三姉妹の逆襲) which also starred Risa Tachibana and Mari Ayukawa. The next year, she was featured in the comedy Funky Monkey Teacher (ファンキー・モンキー・ティーチャー, Fanki Monkī Tīchā) which was released to theaters by the Toei Company in December 1991. Over the next four years, Iijima starred in more than a dozen V-cinema productions as well as posing for gravure (non-nude) photobooks and performing in gravure videos.

In January 1995, Iijima was cast as the lead in the action feature film Zero Woman: Final Mission (Zero WOMAN 警視庁０課の女, Zero Woman: Keishichō 0-ka no onna), a revival of the Zero Woman character from Miki Sugimoto's 1974 film. Despite the title of this film, the Zero Woman franchise continued with a number of sequels. The film was released in an English-language version on VHS and DVD in May 2002 as Zero Woman: Final Mission.

=== Early TV work ===
After Zero Woman, Iijima worked largely in the domain of Japanese TV dramas (J-dorama) including the Fuji Television suspense drama Taeko Sashow's Last Case (沙粧妙子 最後の事件, Sashow Taeko Saigo no Jiken) starring Atsuko Asano which aired from July to September 1995 and the 1998 comedy also on Fuji TV, Sometime Somewhere (今夜、宇宙の片隅で, Konya Uchu no Katasumi de), co-starring Masahiko Nishimura, which had a setting in New York City. In August 1999, Iijima starred in the Fuji TV produced theatrical film Messengers (メッセンジャー, Messenjā). In this romantic comedy, Iijima's character, Naomi Shimizu, is a spoiled rich girl in a dream job who is brought down by circumstances to being a bicycle delivery messenger. Various complications ensue including a romance with her new boss played by Tsuyoshi Kusanagi.

Iijima returned to television in 2000 with the Fuji TV series Bus Stop (バスストップ, Basu Sutoppu) which ran in twelve episode from July to September 2000. Her role was once again the poor little rich girl (as in the film Messengers) but this time she has to resurrect a fading bus company in Tokyo with Teruyoshi Uchimura as the love interest. In the 2001 Tokyo Broadcasting System (TBS) drama Dreams of Romance (恋を何年休んでますか, Koi wo Nannen Yasundemasu ka?), Iijima is cast against type as a breadwinner housewife with a sullen stay-at-home husband. For her 2002 TV series Wedding Planner (ウエディングプランナー, Uedingu purannā), Iijima returned to Fuji TV and the romantic comedy genre as the vice president of a company in the bridal industry. In late 2002 she appeared as the oldest of four daughters of a widowed father (played by Masakazu Tamura) in the TBS domestic drama Life With Dad (おとうさん, Otousan).

Iijima wed musician Nobuteru Maeda in September 1997 but their marriage ended in divorce in March 2001.

=== Later TV work ===
Iijima continued acting in Japanese TV serials including the 2003 Fuji TV romance Innocence in Bloom (ハコイリムスメ！, Hakoiri Musume!) and the 2005 TBS romantic drama Filthy Tongue (汚れた舌, Kegareta Shita). but she also starred in a serious drama about World War II. In the October 2005 TV movie Visas for 6,000 Lives (六千人の命のビザ, Rokusen Nin no Inochi no Visa) Iijima played Yukiko Sugihara, who helped her husband, Japanese Consul Chiune Sugihara, write visas which saved the lives of six thousand Lithuanian Jews in 1940. For the 2008 TV series Hitomi (瞳), broadcast March to September 2008, Iijima, no longer the ingenue, plays the mother of the twenty-year-old heroine Hitomi (Nana Eikura). The romantic comedy How to Marry a 40-Year-Old Woman in 90 Days (４０女と９０日間で結婚する方法, 40 Onna to 90 Nichi Kan de Kekkon suru Houhou) has a 23-year-old "salaryman" (Hayato Ichihara) falling in love with Iijima's character, an "around 40 year old" beautician. The series was originally aired on the mobile phone channel BeeTV but its popularity led Fuji TV to combine the episodes into a TV movie broadcast in December 2009.

Iijima took on her first stage role in May 2010 with the play Nancy (ナンシー, Nanshī), playing a receptionist at a bank where a hostage crisis occurs. Also in the "suspenseful comedy" was actor Masahiko Nishimura who had previously worked with Iijima in the 1998 TV series Sometime Somewhere. In early 2013, Iijima shared top billing with Aya Ueto in the NHK ten part television series Someday at a Place in the Sun (いつか陽のあたる場所で, Itsuka Hi no Ataru Basho de) about two women who meet in prison, one (Ueto) who committed a crime for her lover while the other (Iijima) killed her abusive husband. The series, based on the books by Asa Nonami, follows the lives of the two women after their release from prison.

In January 2013, Iijima announced that she had married a company CEO one year older than her on December 25, 2012, and that a wedding ceremony was planned for early 2013. They divorced on October 27, 2021.

== Filmography ==
=== Television ===
- Taeko Sashow's Last Case (沙粧妙子 最後の事件, Sashow Taeko Saigo no Jiken) (1995)
- Sometime Somewhere (今夜、宇宙の片隅で, Konya Uchu no Katasumi de) (1998)
- Out (~妻たちの犯罪~, Tsumatachi no Hanzai) (1999) as Noriko
- Bus Stop (バスストップ, Basu Sutoppu) (2000) as Natsuo
- Hero (2001)
- Dreams of Romance (恋を何年休んでますか, Koi wo Nannen Yasundemasu ka?) (2001)
- Wedding Planner (ウエディングプランナー, Uedingu purannā) (2002)
- Life With Dad (おとうさん, Otousan) (2002) as Masuda Yu
- Innocence in Bloom (ハコイリムスメ！, Hakoiri Musume!) (2003)
- Filthy Tongue (汚れた舌, Kegareta Shita) (2005)
- Visas for 6,000 Lives (六千人の命のビザ, Rokusen Nin no Inochi no Visa) (2005)
- You Gotta Be Kidding Me! (冗談じゃない！, Jodan ja nai!) (2007) as Nonomura Saeko
- How to Marry a 40-Year-Old Woman in 90 Days (40女と90日間で結婚する方法, 40 Onna to 90 Nichi Kan de Kekkon suru Houhou) (2009)
- Nasake no Onna (ナサケの女) (2010)
- Second to Last Love (2012–2025)
- Someday at a Place in the Sun (2013)
- Last Cinderella (2013) as Shima Hasegawa
- Unbound (2025) as Fuji

=== Films ===
- Funky Monkey Teacher (ファンキー・モンキー・ティーチャー, Fanki Monkī Tīchā) (1991)
- Funky Monkey Teacher 2 (ファンキー・モンキー・ティーチャー２, Fanki Monkī Tīchā 2) (1992)
- Zero Woman: Keishichō 0-ka no onna (1995 aka Zero Woman: Final Mission) as Rei
- Messengers (1999) as Naomi Shimizu
- Bubble Fiction: Boom or Bust, (2007) as herself
- Kurosagi (2008)
- High&Low The Red Rain (2016)
- Family Bond (2020) as Misaki Kawasaki
- Shinji Muroi: Not Defeated (2024)
- Shinji Muroi: Stay Alive (2024)
- Under the Big Onion (2025)

=== Dubbing ===
- Runaway Bride, Maggie Carpenter (Julia Roberts)
