= Maki Miyamae =

Maki Miyamae 宮前 真樹
- Born: 16 January 1973 (age 53); Tōkamachi, Niigata, Japan
- Genres: Japanese pop
- Occupations: Singer, chef, food instructor
- Years active: 1989–1995
- Label: Pony Canyon

Maki Miyamae (宮前 真樹, Miyamae Maki; born 16 January 1973) is a Japanese pop singer, and the oldest member of the group Coco. She was born in Tōkamachi, Niigata, but grew up in Tokyo. Miyamae was a member of Coco from September 1989 until the group's dissolution in 1994. She worked as a solo singer for a while but she left the entertainment industry in 2004 to attend Le Cordon Bleu. She is now a professional chef and food education instructor, running her own restaurant, "CAFE RESTAURANT M.NATURE", in Aoyama, Tokyo.

== Discography ==
=== Singles ===
1. 16 December 1992: Yume e no Position (Chun-Li's Theme). Oricon number 19

== Photobooks ==
1. 1 October 1993: Bagus!
2. 10 February 1995: BREAK
3. 15 December 1995: Candied

== Anime ==
- DNAVI in Beast Wars Neo

== See also ==
- Coco
