= Zero Woman: Assassin Lovers =

- The 2002 U.S. DVD Cover Released by Asia Pulp Cinema.
- Directed by: Masahide Kuwabara
- Written by: Seigo Inoue; Masahide Kuwabara
- Based on: Zero Woman by Tohru Shinohara
- Produced by: Tomoko Hojo; Fueto Kikuchi; Hideo Sugimoto; Shinsuke Yamazaki
- Starring: Kumiko Takeda; Keiji Matsuda
- Cinematography: Shigeru Komatsubara
- Music by: Ryuji Murayama
- Production company: Vision Sugimoto
- Distributed by: MAXAM
- Release date: March 5, 1996
- Running time: 86 minutes
- Country: Japan
- Language: Japanese

Zero Woman: Assassin Lovers (Zero WOMAN III 警視庁０課の女, Zero Woman III: Keishichō 0-ka no onna) is a 1996 Japanese V-Cinema erotic thriller film starring Kumiko Takeda. It is the third installment in the Zero Woman series.

== Plot synopsis ==
Our main character, Rei, is a woman without a past. She works for the Zero Department, an underground police force. She is assigned to kill a group of crime bosses. At the same time, she is haunted by visions of her deceased father and ends up seeking solace of a man, who is later to be revealed to be the hitman hired by the group of crime bosses. Rei now faces a difficult choice.

== Cast ==
=== Japanese cast ===
- Kumiko Takeda as Rei
- Keiji Matsuda as Katsumura
- Tokuma Nishimura as Takefuji
- Marie Jinno as Sayoko
- Charlie Yutani as Daidoji
- Mari Nishima as Tomomi

=== English voice cast ===
- Dorothy Melendrez as Rei
- Jackson Daniels as Katsumura
- Abe Lasser as Takefuji
- Melissa Williamson as Sayoko
- Anthony Mozdy as Daidoji
- Roberta Endo as Tomomi
- John Smallberries as Goda, Kuronuma
- David Umansky as Kitoh
- Bob Bobson as Delivery Guy
- David Lucas as Zero Boss, Rei's Dad
- Wendee Lee as Dominatrix
- Ian Hawk as Boy
- Kaeko Sakamoto as Hostess

== Release ==
The film was released direct-to-video in Japan on VHS on March 5, 1996 and was later released on DVD on March 25, 2000. Central Park Media licensed the film under their Asia Pulp Cinema label. It was released on VHS subtitled on February 22, 2000 and dubbed VHS on April 15, 2001. CPM later released the film on DVD on July 9, 2002. The English dub was produced by Bang Zoom! Entertainment in Burbank, California.

== Reception ==
TV Guide's Reed Lowie gave the film two stars. He said the film goes off through a slow start, and not enough action to satisfy the viewer, although Lowie also complimented on how the cinematography was well-done (aside from a few scenes that were shot in the dark. Jim Mclennan of GirlswithGuns.org described the film as "grimly fiendish, yet effective killer's romance".

== See also ==
- Girls with guns
- Zero Woman, for a list of movies in the series.
