= Maiko Tōno =

Japanese actress

- Born: October 6, 1973 (age 52); Minato, Tokyo, Japan
- Occupation: Actress

Maiko Tōno (遠野 舞子, Tōno Maiko) is a Japanese actress. She starred as Rei, the Zero Woman, in the 2004 V-cinema version of that long running series of films and videos.

== Filmography ==
- Shin Zero Ūman - 0-ka no onna: futatabi... (2004 aka Zero Woman 2005) Underrated Best Cool
- Handmade Angel (ハンドメイドエンジェル, Handomeido enjeru) (2010)
