= CoCo (band) =

Japanese pop group

- Origin: Japan
- Genres: Hi-NRG; Dance-pop funk Electronic music Japanese pop new wave
- Years active: 1989–1994
- Label: Pony Canyon (ポニーキャニオン)
- Past members: Mikiyo Ohno (大野幹代); Azusa Senou (瀬能あづさ); Rieko Miura (三浦 理恵子); Erika Haneda (羽田恵理香); Maki Miyamae (宮前真樹)

CoCo was a Japanese pop idol group which consisted of Mikiyo Ohno, Azusa Senou, Rieko Miura, Erika Haneda, and Maki Miyamae.

== History ==
CoCo released their first single, "Equal Romance", on September 6, 1989. CoCo had a couple of their songs ("Equal Romance," "Omoide ga Ippai," and "Mou Nakanaide") as theme songs for the anime series Ranma ½. Azusa left the group in 1992 and went solo, while the other four stayed behind. Rieko and Maki released solo works but chose to remain in the group.

CoCo joined Ribbon, Qlair and a few solo idols for the "Otomejuku" concert. They performed Shochuu Omimai Moushiagemasu, among other songs.

Their final single "You're My Treasure" was released before they disbanded on August 3, 1994.

== Discography ==
=== Singles ===
#	Title	Release date	Oricon	Album
1	"EQUAL Romance" (EQUALロマンス)	September 6, 1989	7	Strawberry
2	"Hanbun Fushigi" (はんぶん不思議)	January 24, 1990	4	Strawberry
3	"Natsu no Tomodachi/Omoide ga Ippai" (夏の友達/思い出がいっぱい)	May 17, 1990	3	CoCo Ichiban!
4	"Sasayaka na Yūwaku" (ささやかな誘惑)	September 5, 1990	3	Snow Garden
5	"Live Version"	January 1, 1991	3	STRAIGHT
6	"News na Mirai" (Newsな未来)	April 10, 1991	3	CoCo Ichiban!
7	"Muteki no Only You" (無敵のOnly You)	July 31, 1991	4	—
8	"Yume dake Miteru" (夢だけ見てる)	December 4, 1991	7	Share
9	"Dakara Namida to Yobanaide" (だから涙と呼ばないで)	April 17, 1992	7	—
10	"Natsuzora no Dreamer" (夏空のDreamer)	August 5, 1992	9	Sylph
11	"Yokohama Boy Style" (横浜Boy Style)	November 20, 1992	10	Sylph
12	"Chiisa na Ippo de" (ちいさな一歩で)	April 21, 1993	20	Sweet & Bitter
13	"Koi no Junction" (恋のジャンクション)	November 3, 1993	37	—
14	"You're my treasure ~ Tooi Yakusoku" (You're my treasure～遠い約束)	July 6, 1994	17	Sweet & Bitter

=== Albums ===
==== Studio albums ====
- Strawberry (1990) Oricon number 2
- Snow Garden (1990) Oricon number 5
- STRAIGHT (1991) Oricon number 9
- Share (1992) Oricon number 13
- Sylph (1992) Oricon number 29
- Sweet & Bitter (1994) Oricon number 28

==== Compilation albums ====
- CoCo Ichiban! (CoCo一番!) (1991) Oricon number 12
- CoCo Personal Best (CoCoパーソナルベスト) (1993)
- My Kore! (Myこれ!) series
  - My Kore! Ction: CoCo BEST (MYこれ!クション CoCo BEST) (2001)
  - My Kore! Choice 22: STRAIGHT + Singles Collection (Myこれ!チョイス 22 STRAIGHT+シングルコレクション) (2008)
  - My Kore! Lite: CoCo (Myこれ!Lite CoCo) (2010)
- CoCo Uta no Daihyakka volumes 1 & 2 (CoCo☆うたの大百科その1・その2) (2008)

==== Special albums ====
- Modan Dōyō (モダンどうよう) (1994) (as SAMPLE BATTLERS TOKYO featuring CoCo)
