= 5105: The Story of a Mauthausen Escape =

- Directed by: Diego González
- Written by: Diego González
- Cinematography: Lucía Hernández
- Release date: 2017
- Running time: 29 minutes
- Country: Spain
- Language: Spanish

5105: The Story of a Mauthausen Escape (original title: 5105 Historia de una fuga de Mauthausen) is a Spanish-language documentary film directed by Diego González released in 2017. It tells the story of three Spanish prisoners in World War II Austria who devised a plan to escape from the Mauthausen concentration camp, something that had never succeeded till that time.

== Synopsis ==
Agustín Santos was one of the 7,000 Spanish prisoners who passed through Mauthausen. It was January 1941, and both the aforementioned concentration camp and the Gusen camp had just been upgraded to Category III, synonymous with harsher disciplinary measures against their prisoners.

Facing a horizon of no return and death as an escape, Agustín, prisoner 5105, devised a plan with two companions to attempt an escape. Their goal was to tell the world about the horrors and suffering that occurred in those facilities, from which no prisoner had yet managed to escape alive.

Their exodus lasted thirty days, during which they walked 350 kilometers until the Nazi authorities intercepted Agustín and his two companions just thirty kilometers from the Swiss border. Subsequently, he was sent to Gusen and forced to perform hard labor. Their journey together came to an end, and each would face a different fate. He was finally liberated in 1945 by American troops and lived abroad until the end of the Francoist dictatorship.

== Release ==
The film premiered on July 23, 2017, during the 23rd Iberian Film Festival. It was first shown that day at the López de Ayala Theatre in Badajoz.

During January 2019, the work was shown in multiple towns in Extremadura, such as Mérida, Badajoz, Jaraíz de la Vera, and Herrera del Duque. The director and screenwriter Diego González and part of the production team attended some of these events. The documentary gained popularity in this community, as around 300 Extremadurans passed through Mauthausen, and Agustín was originally from the town of El Gordo. Of those 300, only half managed to survive the concentration camp, including Agustín, whose trail was lost after democracy returned to Spain.

== Production ==
The production of the documentary was complicated due to a scarcity of material. Rebeca Aparicio and Julio Carranza, producers of the short film, mix testimonies from historians and psychologists with animations to depict the escape. They also use real footage of Mauthausen from that time and recover moving files provided by the Steven Spielberg foundation.

Dosde Extremadura Media SL and Synopsis 103 Factory of Communication SL were the audiovisual producers who financed the project. It is noteworthy that the short is narrated in the first person thanks to Agustín's testimony, which was collected in the book The Commander's Pigs.

The project arose after Diego González found an interview discussing an escape in Mauthausen that left a Spanish survivor. Following this, both he and Rebeca, the documentary's producer, got to work and found a book of accounts from survivors of the concentration camp. Among them was Agustín. Regarding the material provided by Spielberg's foundation, it was acquired by the American filmmaker after his film Schindler's List.

== Awards ==
- Winner of the best short film award at the first edition of Fescimed in 2017.
- Winner of the "La Fila" festival in Valladolid in 2018. In that edition, the documentary directed by Diego González triumphed over 81 other short films from around the world in the documentary, animation, and fiction categories.
- Nominated for best documentary short at the Fugaz Awards for Spanish short films.
