= Chieko Shiratori =

Japanese actress

Chieko Shiratori (白鳥 智恵子, Shiratori Chieko) (born August 10, 1975 in Yokohama, Japan) is a Japanese actress.

== Filmography ==
- Twilight Syndrome: The Digital Movie (2000)
- Heisei kinyū dō: Maruhi no onna (1999)
- Kyōhan (1999)
- Zero Woman: Abunai yūgi (1998 a.k.a. Zero Woman: Dangerous Game) - Rei
- Metropolitan Police Branch 82 (1998) - Mika
- Eko Eko Azaraku: The Series (1997) TV series - Kaoru Okamoto
- Eko eko azaraku II (1996) - Shoko Takanashi
- Sakura no sono (1990) - Kumi Takano
