= 66 Months =

- Film poster
- Directed by: James Bluemel
- Written by: James Bluemel
- Produced by: Gordon Wilson; Robbie Burns
- Starring: Nigel Fletcher; Gordon Wilson
- Cinematography: Gordon Wilson
- Edited by: Stefan Ronowicz
- Production companies: Moving Target Films; Dartmouth Films
- Release date: January 2011
- Running time: 82 minutes
- Country: United Kingdom
- Language: English

66 Months: Under the Radar is a 2011 British documentary film directed by James Bluemel focusing on a homeless Nigel Fletcher surviving 6 years without government assistance. It was produced by Moving Target Films in association with Dartmouth Films and was first shown in 2011.

== Production ==
Filmmaker Gordon Wilson was jobless and homeless when he attended a free workshop at Film Oxford on Catherine Street in Oxford. Inspired by the relationship between Gordon Wilson and his partner Robbie Burns, the film documents six years in the life of his friend Nigel Fletcher and took seven years to complete. Wilson had met and lived with Nigel Fletcher at a halfway house. Through scenes dealing with abuse, mental illness and alcoholism, the film tells the story of the two's friendship and shows the relationship between the pair. Burns died before the film was finished.

According to the filmmakers:

Every year, thousands of people slip through the net of social care provision into a dark, lonely and often dangerous underworld. Nigel is one of those people. Abandoned by those who should have been caring for him, abused and vulnerable Nigel lived under the radar of social services for 66 months. In this hostile environment, Nigel came to rely on Robbie, an alcoholic. Together they lived in poverty in the midst of the dreaming spires of Oxford. And so began their troubling, disturbing but genuinely loving relationship.

After 66 months Nigel was finally picked up by social services and was provided with a secure and safe place to stay. Told from Nigel’s perspective, this film juxtaposes his present experience of institutional life with a series of memories and flashbacks from his time in the 'wild'. The film was shot over six years and gives an extraordinary insight into a hidden world, made possible only by the close relationship between the filmmakers and contributors. Many difficult questions are raised about abusive relationships, mental illness and society’s duty of care. But this touching and very personal film reaches beyond these to provide an intimate and complex portrait of a dysfunctional relationship in which physical suffering is ultimately preferable to loneliness.

== Cast ==
- Nigel Fletcher as himself
- Gordon Wilson as himself

== Reception ==
The Argus praised the film, calling it "A gritty documentary that 'exposes the holes' in Oxfordshire’s social care" and the British Association of Social Workers described it as the "most heartbreaking, lacerating and uncomfortable film ever".
