= 58 Seconds =

- 58 másodperc
- Directed by: Lívia Gyarmathy
- Written by: Lívia Gyarmathy
- Starring: Tibor Frühauf
- Cinematography: Ferenc Neményi
- Music by: Géza Böszörményi
- Distributed by: MAFILM Riport és Dokumentum Filmstudió
- Release date: 1964
- Running time: 15 minutes
- Country: Hungary
- Language: Hungarian

58 Seconds (Hungarian: 58 másodperc) is a 1964 Hungarian sports documentary short film directed by Lívia Gyarmathy. It delves into the demanding training regimen of competitive swimmers, and shows the agony and ecstasy of derbies themselves. The director went to Margaret Island to interview star Hungarian swimmers of the day, such as Ágota Sebő and Valéria Gyenge, but ultimately decided to go with an amateur swimmer instead.

The film is Gyarmathy's directorial debut.

== Content ==
"With the help of close-up images, all the emotions of the main character can be followed, both before the competition and after the defeat. The last sequences show the start again."

== Themes ==
Her approach in the film was compared to her later work, Kilencedik emelet (1977): "It is about the impossibility of success, but also about the inevitable necessity of following the path that leads to it. It is about the struggle, about “almost” success – in the narrow, hopeless world of the Kádár era. Where our humanity can be preserved only by not giving up. Even if we are defeated – that is, our situation is hopeless – we will not. The swimmer of 58 seconds falls short of the big race, but continues training the next day; the "welfare" family model of the Kilencedik emelet is falling apart, but this spurs the teenage girl of the two children to even better performance."
