= Zero Woman =

Japanese adult film series

Zero Woman (Japanese: ゼロウーマン) is a Japanese video exploitation series with ten entries dating from 1974 to 2007. The series chronicles the adventures of a woman named Rei, who, working for a fictional Tokyo Metropolitan Police Department secret agency called Zero Division, goes undercover to infiltrate unsavory groups and assassinate drug kingpins, mercenaries, and various criminals and their henchmen. The original film may have been the inspiration for Luc Besson's 1990 film La Femme Nikita.

== Series ==
Zero Woman: Red Handcuffs (０課の女 赤い手錠, Zeroka no onna: Akai wappa) was released by the Toei studio in May 1974. Along with Female Convict 701: Scorpion and its sequels, it was part of Toei's Pinky Violence series of sexploitation films made in response to the success of the Nikkatsu studio's Roman Porno titles. The film starred Miki Sugimoto as Rei who is released from prison to become the deadly assassin Zero Woman for a secret government agency. Also featured are Eiji Gō, Tetsurō Tamba, Hideo Murota and Yōko Mihara. The film was directed by Yukio Noda and like the Female Convict Scorpion series was based on a manga by Tōru Shinohara.

Possibly due to the success of the 1990 La Femme Nikita and the 1993 American film rendition of the Nikita story, Point of No Return, in the mid-1990s, a movie and a series of low-budget straight-to-video V-cinema releases based on the original Zero Woman appeared. A different actress played Rei in each of the productions. The January 1995 movie, Zero Woman: Final Mission (Zero WOMAN 警視庁０課の女, Zero Woman: Keishichō 0-ka no onna) was directed by Koji Enokido and starred Naoko Iijima (as Rei) and Tokuma Nishioka.

From 1995 to 2004, seven V-cinema works were released:

- Zero Woman 2 AKA Zero Woman (Zero WOMAN ＩＩ 警視庁０課の女, Zero Woman II: Keishichō 0-ka no onna) (1995) starring Natsuki Ozawa
- Zero Woman: Assassin Lovers (Zero WOMAN ＩＩＩ 警視庁０課の女, Zero Woman III: Keishichō 0-ka no onna) (1996) starring Kumiko Takeda
- Zero Woman: The Accused (Zero WOMAN 名前のない女, Zero Woman: Namae no nai onna) (1996) starring Mai Tachihara
- Zero Woman: The Hunted (Zero WOMAN 消せない記憶, Zero Woman: Kesenai kioku) (1997) starring Mikiyo Ono
- Zero Woman: Dangerous Game (Zero WOMAN 危ない遊戯, Zero Woman: Abunai yūgi) (1998) starring Chieko Shiratori
- Zero Woman Returns (Zero WOMAN 最後の指令, Zero Woman: Saigo no shirei) (1998) starring Saori Ono
- Zero Woman 2005 (新ゼロ・ウーマン ０課の女 再び…, Shin Zero Woman 0-ka no onna: futatabi...) (2004) starring Maiko Tōno

In 2007, the pink film studio Shintōhō Eiga released the tenth entry in the series, Zero Woman R (ゼロ・ウーマンＲ 警視庁０課の女／欲望の代償, Zero Woman R: Keishichou 0-ka no onna yokubou no daishou), directed by Ken'ichi Fujiwara and starring Atsuko Miura as Rei. Also in the cast were Sasa Handa, Masaki Miura and Hiromitsu Kiba. The film was released theatrically by Shintōhō on May 26, 2007, and a DVD edition was published by the Take Shobo company in July 2007.

== See also ==
- Femme fatale
- Girls with guns
