= Mikiyo Ōno =

Japanese model, actress and J-pop singer (born 1974)

Mikiyo Ohno 大野 幹代
- Born: 17 June 1974 (age 52); Chiba, Japan
- Genres: Pop
- Occupations: Singer, actress, model
- Years active: 1989–1995
- Label: Pony Canyon
- Website: interq.or.jp/blue/katsuya/1989/coco/index.html

Mikiyo Ōno (大野 幹代, Ōno Mikiyo; born 17 June 1974) is a Japanese model, actress and J-pop singer. She was the youngest member of the group CoCo.

== Life and career ==
Ohno was born on 17 June 1974 in Chiba Prefecture, Japan. As a teenager, she was a finalist at the 2nd Japan Bishōjo Contest, a beauty pageant held in 1988. Ohno joined the Japanese J-pop girl group CoCo in 1989 and remained with them until the group's dissolution in September 1994. While still with CoCo, she also released single works in 1992 and 1993.

In 1997 she had the starring role in the V-cinema Zero Woman: Kesenai kioku, part of the long-running Zero Woman series.

== Filmography ==
- Zero Woman: Kesenai kioku (1997 a.k.a. Zero Woman: The Hunted) – Rei

== Discography ==
=== Singles ===
1. 1 July 1992: Yurushite.... (Oricon number 15)
2. 21 May 1993: Furueru Kesshin (Oricon number 39)

== Picture books ==
1. 6 September 1993: NOVA LUNA
2. 2 June 1995: The Wind Rose
3. 1 March 1996: True Blue
4. 25 October 1997: Scarlet

== See also ==
- Coco
