= Eight Hours of Terror =

- Japanese movie poster
- Directed by: Seijun Suzuki
- Written by: Yanagita Gorō; Tsukiji Rokurō
- Produced by: Asada Kenzō
- Cinematography: Nagatsuka Kazue
- Edited by: Suzuki Akira
- Music by: Takio Niki
- Production company: Nikkatsu
- Distributed by: Nikkatsu
- Release date: March 8, 1957 (Japan)
- Running time: 78 minutes
- Country: Japan
- Language: Japanese

Eight Hours of Terror (Japanese: ８時間の恐怖, Hepburn: Hachijikan no kyōfu) is a 1957 black-and-white Japanese film directed by Seijun Suzuki. It is a thriller film with gangster film elements, based partly on John Ford's Stagecoach.

== Cast ==
- Fukami Taizō
- Misuzu Eiko
- Shima Keiko
- Nakahara Keishichi
- Nitani Hideak
- Kazuki Minako
- Minami Sumiko
- Kondō Hiroshi
- Tone Harue
- Kaneko Nobuo
- Fukuda Fumiko
- Hisako Hara
- Shima Keiko
