= 2050 (film) =

2018 American science fiction drama film

- Film poster
- Directed by: Princeton Holt
- Written by: Brian Ackley
- Produced by: David Vaughn; Princeton Holt; Chris Riquinha; Brian Ackley
- Starring: Irina Abraham; Devin Fuller; David Vaughn; Dean Cain
- Cinematography: Jared Roybal
- Edited by: Alex Bendo; Zach Lapidus
- Music by: Konstantinos Lyrakis, with original music by Cultural Bastards, Ebenezthenatural
- Production company: Butterfly Chasers LLC
- Distributed by: Uncork'd Entertainment; ANERKE; Hewes Pictures
- Release date: November 16, 2018 (Williamsburg Independent Film Festival)
- Running time: 104 minutes
- Country: United States
- Language: English

2050 is a 2018 American independent science fiction drama film directed by Princeton Holt and starring Dean Cain, Stormi Maya, and Stefanie Bloom. It premiered on November 16, 2018, at the Williamsburg Independent Film Festival and was released theatrically on March 1, 2019. It was distributed by ANERKE.

The film received mixed reviews and won 16 awards, including those for cinematography, writing, and VFX. It was also an official selection at the Berlin Sci-Fi Film Festival, Other World's Austin Film Festival, and Boston Sci-Fi Film Festival.

== Plot ==
Michael Green (David Vaughn), married, a video game designer and father of two, is struggling to find intimacy with his wife Brooke. Upon discovering his brother-in-law Drew (Devin Fuller) has purchased a customizable sex robot, he turns to the warehouse run by Maxwell (Dean Cain) to create his own perfect mate. In the end, Drew is unable to find fulfillment with his sex robot, and eventually hands it off to a friend. Michael falls in love with his sex robot. When Brooke discovers his affair with a sex robot, they argue. Eventually Michael convinces his wife to create one for herself.

== Cast ==
- Dean Cain as Maxwell
- Stormi Maya as Quin
- Stefanie Bloom as Sophia
- Devin Fuller as Drew
- David Vaughn as Michael Greene
- Irina Abraham as Brooke Greene
- Hope Blackstock as Alli
- Jonathan Ercolino as Cameron
- Jace Nicole as Diana
- Shannone Holt as Reign Regan
- Chris Riquinha as David

== Production and release ==
Filming wrapped in January 2018 and was director Princeton Holt's third film. Frequent collaborators, many of the producers also performed additional roles: Holt directed, Ackley wrote, and Vaughn and Riquinha acted. The team expressed feeling surrounded by an "unusually supportive group of investors" while working on this project. Post production was slated to wrap in March 2018.

First premiering at the Williamsburg Independent Film Festival on November 17, 2018, 2050 opened theatrically on March 1, 2019, in Los Angeles and performed well, keeping pace with blockbuster hits such as How to Train Your Dragon during its first weekend, and was subsequently held over an additional week before making its way to other select cities.

== Reception ==
Kyle Jonathan of The Movie Sleuth describes 2050 as being "one of the first beautiful disasters of the year," applauding the camerawork, premise, and acting. In an article for the LA Times, Noel Murray commented, "To their credit, Holt and his co-writer Brian Ackley have created a realistic near-future world on a budget."

The film won the award for Most Provocative Film at the 2019 Boston Science Fiction Film Festival.
