= The Seven Tapes =

Biographical documentary about the Israeli poet, Yona Wallach

- Hebrew: 7 הסלילים של יונה וולך
- Directed by: Yair Qedar
- Edited by: Yael Badrashi
- Release date: 17 July 2012
- Running time: 56 minutes
- Country: Israel
- Language: Hebrew

The Seven Tapes (Hebrew: 7 הסלילים של יונה וולך, romanized: Sheva Haslilim Shel Yona Walach) is a 2012 Israeli biographical documentary film by Yair Qedar. It is a portrait of Yona Wallach, based on interviews she had with Hilit Yeshurun.

The Seven Tapes premiered at the 2012 Jerusalem Film Festival, where it won the Best Film and Best Sound awards in the documentary film competition. It is the second film in the documentary series "Ha'Ivrim".

== Synopsis ==
In the early 2000s, researchers uncovered several lost tape reels of several 1984 interviews of Wallach by Yeshurun as Wallach was dying.

Wallach's voice is the foundation of The Seven Tapes, accompanied by additional interviews, archive footage, and animated clips of her poetry. In the interviews, Wallach talks about her writing process, her approach to god, stories about different experiences she had, and her attraction to insanity, sex, and drugs. The result is a combination of autobiography and biography.

== Critical reception ==
In his Portfolio magazine review, Yuval Saar asks: "When was the last time you were really moved? But really?" and goes on to say that it doesn't happen to him often, but it happened when he saw this film, which moved him to tears. Habama website called The Seven Tapes an exciting and moving encounter with an extraordinary artist. In Time Out, Yael Shuv called the film "rich and thrilling", and commended the choice to animate her words in a style she calls "interesting, varied and edgy". Yonatan Berg wrote, "The film is awe inspiring. The design of the film by Yaron Shein is brilliant and innovative, and the switching between visual images in the film parallels the verbal frenzy that sometimes prevails in Wallach's writing".
