= 2006: Varanasi the Untold =

- Directed by: Aryaman Keshu
- Written by: Aryaman Keshu
- Starring: Raima Sen; Mukul Dev; Om Puri; Rahul Dev; Ravi Kishan
- Production companies: Atul Raj Productions; Silver Light Entertainment; Morning Star
- Country: India
- Language: Hindi

2006: Varanasi the Untold is an unreleased Indian Hindi-language thriller film written and directed by Aryaman Keshu. Raima Sen plays the lead role in the film.

== Plot ==
The film is partially inspired by the terror attacks that shook the holy city of Varanasi in 2006.

== Cast ==
- Raima Sen
- Om Puri
- Ravi Kishan
- Rahul Dev
- Aankit HS Vyas as IAS officer
- Brij Parashar as Dharam

== Production ==
=== Development ===
The film was officially announced in the second half of September 2016.

=== Casting ===
The creators of the film cast Raima Sen, along with Om Puri, Ravi Kishan, and Rahul Dev.

=== Filming ===
The principal photography of the film commenced in October 2016.
