= Mai Tachihara =

Japanese actress

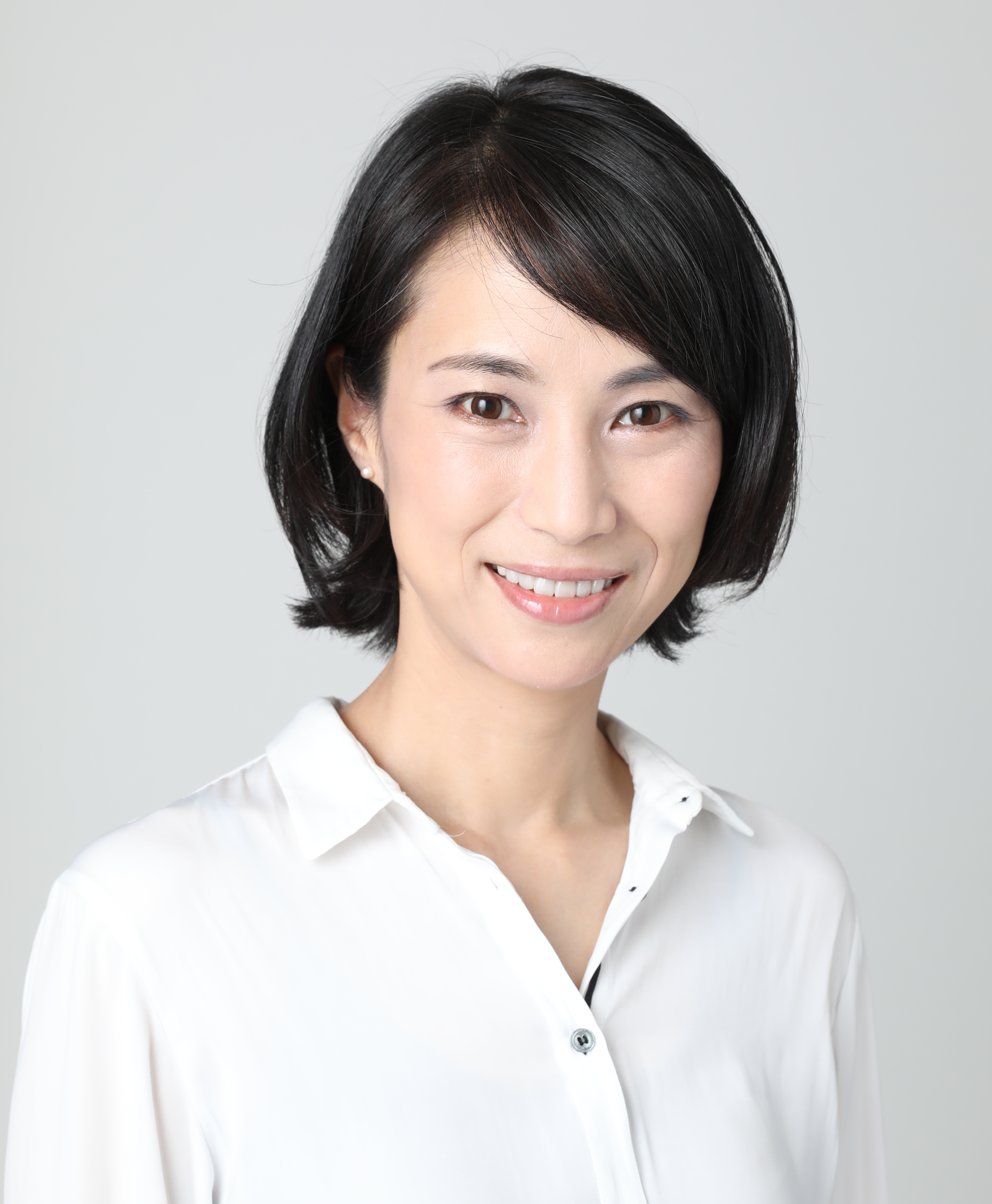
Mai Tachihara

Mai Tachihara (立原 麻衣, Tachihara Mai) is a Japanese actress. She appeared in Ring: Kanzenban, the 1995 TV movie adaptation of Koji Suzuki's novel Ring.

== Filmography ==
- Ring: Kanzenban (1995 TV) - Shizuka Asakawa
- Zero Woman: The Accused (1997 aka Zero Woman: Namae no nai onna) - Rei
- Kyōto sekushī yōkai satsujin annai (1997 TV)
- Keiji ichidai: Hiratsuka Hachibei no Shōwa jiken shi (2009 TV series) - Kichizō's wife
- Sakuya kono hana (2010) TV series
