= 1982 – A Love Marriage =

1982 A Love Marriage
- Directed by: Prashant Gore
- Written by: Amitkumar Sharma, Prashant Gore
- Produced by: Shivkumar Sharma
- Starring: Amitkumar Sharma; Omna Harjani
- Cinematography: Giriratan Singh
- Edited by: Sumit Kumar
- Music by: Anurag Godbole; Chinmay Hulyalkar
- Production company: Shuddh Paarivarik Chalchitra
- Release date: 2016
- Running time: 112 minutes
- Country: India
- Language: Hindi

1982 A Love Marriage is an Indian comedy film directed by Prashant Gore and produced by Shivkumar Sharma. The film has been released by multiple international film festivals. Now the film is being shown worldwide by National and International TV channels. The film is available on Amazon Prime Video, MX Player, etc.

== Overview ==
1982 A Love Marriage is directed by Prashant Gore. It stars Amitkumar Sharma and Omna Harjani in the lead cast. The film is picturized as 1980s film. First trailer was unveiled on 29 January. The film was first scheduled for release on 26 February 2016 but the release date was later pushed because of not getting enough screens for release. The producer Shivkumar Sharma said that they don't have enough budget to compete with the films like Aligarh and Tere Bin Laden: Dead or Alive which were released on 26 February 2016.

== Cast ==
- Amitkumar Sharma as Prem
- Omna Harjani as Suman
- Gaurav Prakash Kothari
- Rita Agarwal
- Aloksen Gupta
- Indira Mansukhani
- Sahil Patel
- Nirmal Sehrawat

== Awards and nominations ==
| Award | Category | Recipient(s) | Result |
|---|---|---|---|
| 9th Jaipur International Film Festival | Best Romantic Film | Shivkumar Sharma | Won |
| 5th Delhi International Film Festival | Best Feature Film | Shivkumar Sharma | Nominated |
