= Erika Haneda =

Japanese singer

Erika Haneda (羽田恵理香, Haneda Erika; born 7 March 1973) is a J-pop singer, and a member of the group CoCo.

She was born in Tokyo, Japan in 1973. Her solo debut was on 21 September 1991.

She changed the spelling of her name to はねだえりか and はねだ・えりか.

== Discography ==
=== Singles ===
1. 21 September 1991: Maigo ni Sasenaide. Oricon number 13.
2. 17 July 1992: Yume Karasamenaide. Oricon number 16.
3. 25 July 1996: Sha La La [AMDM-6172]

== Picture Books ==
1. 31 July 1992: L.A. DREAM
2. 30 May 1996: Pink

== See also ==
- CoCo
