= Fangoria Films =

American film company

- Type: Subsidiary
- Industry: Films
- Genre: Horror films; Exploitation films; Thriller films
- Founded: 1990; 36 years ago
- Headquarters: New York City, New York, United States
- Products: See § Releases
- Parent: Fangoria Entertainment
- Website: fangoria.com

Fangoria Films is a film production and distribution company based out of New York City, New York. It is a subsidiary of Fangoria Entertainment, which encompasses various branches of Starlog's Fangoria brand.

== As production company ==
Fangoria Films was founded in 1990 with the goal of financing one feature film a year. The first film was 1990's Mindwarp, starring Bruce Campbell. They then created Children of the Night in 1991 and Severed Ties in 1992 before ceasing production.

== As distributor ==
In 1996, Fangoria Films re-emerged as a distribution company, occasionally using their "Gore Zone" label, to release twenty low-budget horror features over the next ten years. From 1999 to 2003, they partnered with Bedford Entertainment to attain wider releases of certain Fangoria titles. Movies released during this time included I, Zombie: A Chronicle of Pain, The Last Horror Movie, Slashers, and Dead Meat. Many of these films featured the Fangoria logo along the top of their video/DVD covers, while Fangoria's involvement in other releases was substantially more subdued.

In 2004/2005, Fangoria Films produced and distributed Fangoria's Blood Drive, two DVD compilations of award-winning short horror films. The first volume was hosted by musician-turned-filmmaker Rob Zombie, and the second by MuchMusic's (now called FUSE) Mistress Juliya.

In 2010, Fangoria launched the Frightfest DVD line. The new label, done in conjunction with Lightning Media, sought to release new horror movies via DVD, video-on-demand and Digital Download. The label ended up releasing eight titles.

In 2013, Fangoria re-launched the Fangoria Presents label. This new label offered new horror titles available on DVD and video-on-demand, along with re-releases of classic horror films on video-on-demand via their website.

== Releases ==
Fangoria Films

- Mindwarp (1990)
- Children of the Night (1991)
- Severed Ties (1992)

Fangoria Presents

- Wilderness (1996)
- I, Zombie: A Chronicle of Pain (1998)
- Lady of the Lake (1998)
- Angel of the Night (1998)
- School's Out (1999)
- Slashers (2001)
- Eternal Blood (2002)
- One Hell of a Christmas (2002)
- Fangoria's Blood Drive (2004)
- Fangoria's Blood Drive II (2005)

Fangoria's Gorezone

- The Last Horror Movie (2003)
- Dead Meat (2004)
- Skinned Deep (2004)
- Joshua (2006)
- Insecticidal (2006)

Fangoria Frightfest

- Fragile (2005)
- Grimm Love (2006)
- Pig Hunt (2008)
- The Haunting (2009)
- Dark House (2009)
- Hunger (2009)
- The Tomb (2009)
- Road Kill (2010)

Fangoria Presents (relaunch)

- Axed (2012)
- Inhuman Resources (2012)
- Entity (2012)
- Sin Reaper (2012)
- Germ Z (2012)
- Omnivores (2013)
- Corpsing (2013)

Fangoria Films (relaunch)

- Puppet Master: The Littlest Reich (2018)
- Satanic Panic (2019)
- Porno (2019)
- VFW (2019)
- Castle Freak (2020)
