= IZombie =

iZombie or I, Zombie may refer to:

- iZombie (comic book), comic book
  - iZombie (TV series), American TV series
- I, Zombie, British film
