= List of covers of Fangoria Magazine =

This is a list of films, people, and topics that have appeared as the main subject on the cover of Fangoria. The original run of Fangoria ran from 1979 to 2015. Fangoria returned to print as Volume 2 in 2018. Beginning in July 2021 with Volume 2, Issue 12 each issue of Fangoria has 2 different covers, one version that is sent to subscribers and another that is sold on newsstands.

== 1979 ==
- Issue 1 (Aug. 1979) – 25 Years with Godzilla
- Issue 2 (Oct. 1979) – Prophecy
- Issue 3 (Dec. 1979) – Christopher Lee in Arabian Adventure

== 1980 ==
- Issue 4 (Feb. 1980) – Spock and the New Aliens of Star Trek
- Issue 5 (Apr. 1980) –Saturn 3
- Issue 6 (June 1980) – Anthony Daniels in The Empire Strikes Back
- Issue 7 (Aug. 1980) – Jack Nicholson in The Shining
- Issue 8 (Oct. 1980) – Zombie
- Issue 9 (Nov. 1980) – Motel Hell

== 1981 ==
- Issue 10 (Jan. 1981) – Scanners
- Issue 11 (Feb. 1981) – The Funhouse
- Issue 12 (Apr. 1981) – Friday the 13th Part II
- Issue 13 (June 1981) – Dragonslayer
- Issue 14 (Aug. 1981) – Rick Baker & An American Werewolf in London
- Issue 15 (Oct. 1981) – Halloween II
- Issue 16 (Dec. 1981) – Ghost Story

== 1982 ==
- Issue 17 (Feb. 1982) – The Grisly Independents: Pranks, The Deadly Spawn and Bloody Pulp
- Issue 18 (Apr. 1982) – Cat People
- Issue 19 (May 1982) – Poltergeist
- Issue 20 (July 1982) – Creepshow
- Issue 21 (Aug. 1982) – Rob Bottin & The Thing
- Issue 22 (Oct. 1982) – Halloween III: Season of the Witch
- Issue 23 (Nov. 1982) – The Evil Dead
- Issue 24 (Dec. 1982) – Xtro

== 1983 ==
- Issue 25 (Feb. 1983) – Videodrome
- Issue 26 (Mar. 1983) – Dick Smith, The Hunger
- Issue 27 (May 1983) – Grande Illusions: "Gore and Me" by Tom Savini
- Issue 28 (July 1983) – Spasms
- Issue 29 (Sept. 1983) – Gates of Hell
- Issue 30 (Oct. 1983) – Twilight Zone
- Issue 31 (Dec. 1983) – Amityville 3-D

== 1984 ==
- Issue 32 (Jan. 1984) – Christine
- Issue 33 (Feb. 1984) – The Keep
- Issue 34 (Mar. 1984) – Mutant
- Issue 35 (Apr. 1984) – Ozzy Osbourne's "Bark at the Moon"
- Issue 36 (July 1984) – Friday the 13th: The Final Chapter
- Issue 37 (Aug. 1984) – Gremlins
- Issue 38 (Oct. 1984) – Gremlins
- Issue 39 (Nov. 1984) – V: The Final Battle
- Issue 40 (Dec. 1984) – The Return of the Living Dead

== 1985 ==
- Issue 41 (Jan. 1985) – The Jacksons' "Torture"
- Issue 42 (Feb. 1985) – The Company of Wolves
- Issue 43 (Mar. 1985) – Day of the Dead
- Issue 44 (May 1985) – Friday the 13th: A New Beginning
- Issue 45 (June 1985) – Friday the 13th: A New Beginning
- Issue 46 (Aug. 1985) – Lifeforce
- Issue 47 (Aug. 1985) – Day of the Dead
- Issue 48 (Oct. 1985) – The Return of the Living Dead
- Issue 49 (Nov. 1985) – A Nightmare on Elm Street 2: Freddy's Revenge

== 1986 ==
- Issue 50 (Jan. 1986) – A Nightmare on Elm Street 2: Freddy's Revenge
- Issue 51 (Jan. 1986) – House
- Issue 52 (Mar. 1986) – F/X
- Issue 53 (May 1986) – Peter Litten
- Issue 54 (June 1986) – Poltergeist II: The Other Side
- Issue 55 (July 1986) – Invaders from Mars
- Issue 56 (Aug. 1986) – Maximum Overdrive
- Issue 57 (Sept. 1986) – The Texas Chainsaw Massacre 2
- Issue 58 (Oct. 1986) – The Fly
- Issue 59 (Dec. 1986) – From Beyond

== 1987 ==
- Issue 60 (Jan. 1987) – Little Shop of Horrors
- Issue 61 (Feb. 1987) – Rawhead Rex
- Issue 62 (Mar. 1987) – A Nightmare on Elm Street 3: Dream Warriors
- Issue 63 (May 1987) – Evil Dead II
- Issue 64 (June 1987) – "The Making of Nightmare 3" by Robert Englund
- Issue 65 (July 1987) – Predator
- Issue 66 (Aug. 1987) – The Lost Boys
- Issue 67 (Sept. 1987) – Hellraiser
- Issue 68 (Oct. 1987) – Jason Voorhees
- Issue 69 (Dec. 1987) – Prince of Darkness

== 1988 ==
- Issue 70 (Jan. 1988) – Pumpkinhead
- Issue 71 (Feb. 1988) – Cellar Dweller
- Issue 72 (Mar. 1988) – Bad Dreams
- Issue 73 (May 1988) – Dead Heat
- Issue 74 (June 1988) – Critters 2
- Issue 75 (July 1988) – Phantasm II
- Issue 76 (Aug. 1988) – Fright Night Part 2
- Issue 77 (Sept. 1988) – A Nightmare on Elm Street 4: The Dream Master
- Issue 78 (Oct. 1988) – Hellraiser II
- Issue 79 (Dec. 1988) – Halloween 4: The Return of Michael Myers

== 1989 ==
- Issue 80 (Feb. 1989) – I, Madman
- Issue 81 (Apr. 1989) – House III: The Horror Show
- Issue 82 (May 1989) – Night Life
- Issue 83 (June 1989) – Friday the 13th Part VIII: Jason Takes Manhattan
- Issue 84 (July 1989) – Tales from the Crypt
- Issue 85 (Aug. 1989) – A Nightmare on Elm Street 5: The Dream Child
- Issue 86 (Sept. 1989) – A Nightmare on Elm Street 5: The Dream Child
- Issue 87 (Oct. 1989) – The Phantom of the Opera
- Issue 88 (Nov. 1989) – Halloween 5: The Revenge of Michael Myers
- Issue 89 (Dec. 1989) – Leatherface: The Texas Chainsaw Massacre III

== 1990 ==
- Issue 90 (Feb. 1990) – Nightbreed
- Issue 91 (Apr. 1990) – Bride of Reanimator
- Issue 92 (May 1990) – Tales from the Darkside: The Movie
- Issue 93 (June 1990) – Gremlins 2: The New Batch
- Issue 94 (July 1990) – The Exorcist III
- Issue 95 (Aug. 1990) – Total Recall
- Issue 96 (Sept. 1990) – Darkman
- Issue 97 (Oct. 1990) – Night of the Living Dead
- Issue 98 (Nov. 1990) - Child's Play 2
- Issue 99 (Dec. 1990) – Predator 2

== 1991 ==
- Issue 100 (Mar. 1991) – 100th Issue Special
- Issue 101 (Apr. 1991) – Sometimes They Come Back
- Issue 102 (May 1991) – Dolly Dearest
- Issue 103 (June 1991) – Children of the Night
- Issue 104 (July 1991) – Terminator 2
- Issue 105 (Aug. 1991) – Body Parts
- Issue 106 (Sept. 1991) – Cast a Deadly Spell
- Issue 107 (Oct. 1991) – Freddy's Dead: The Final Nightmare
- Issue 108 (Nov. 1991) – The People Under the Stairs

== 1992 ==
- Issue 109 (Jan. 1992) – The Addams Family
- Issue 110 (Mar. 1992) – Hellraiser III: Hell on Earth
- Issue 111 (Apr. 1992) – Sleepwalkers
- Issue 112 (May 1992) – Hellraiser III: Hell on Earth
- Issue 113 (June 1992) – Alien 3
- Issue 114 (July 1992) – The Penguin, Batman Returns
- Issue 115 (Aug. 1992) – Army of Darkness
- Issue 116 (Sept. 1992) – Special All-Vampire Issue
- Issue 117 (Oct. 1992) – Dust Devil
- Issue 118 (Nov. 1992) – Bram Stoker's Dracula
- Issue 119 (Dec. 1992) – Bram Stoker's Dracula

== 1993 ==
- Issue 120 (Mar. 1993) – Army of Darkness
- Issue 121 (Apr. 1993) – The Dark Half
- Issue 122 (May 1993) – Warlock: The Armageddon
- Issue 123 (June 1993) – Ticks
- Issue 124 (July 1993) – Jurassic Park
- Issue 125 (Aug. 1993) – Jason Goes to Hell: The Final Friday
- Issue 126 (Sept. 1993) – Jurassic Park
- Issue 127 (Oct. 1993) – Return of the Living Dead 3
- Issue 128 (Nov. 1993) – Pumpkinhead II: Blood Wings
- Issue 129 (Dec. 1993) – Special Issue: Werewolves on the Loose; Full Eclipse

== 1994 ==
- Issue 130 (Mar. 1994) – Phantasm III: Lord of the Dead
- Issue 131 (Apr. 1994) – Wolf
- Issue 132 (May 1994) – Brainscan
- Issue 133 (June 1994) – The Stand
- Issue 134 (July 1994) – Wolf
- Issue 135 (Aug. 1994) – Necronomicon
- Issue 136 (Sept. 1994) – In the Mouth of Madness
- Issue 137 (Oct. 1994) – Wes Craven's New Nightmare
- Issue 138 (Nov. 1994) – Mary Shelley's Frankenstein

== 1995 ==
- Issue 139 (Jan. 1995) – Interview with the Vampire
- Issue 140 (Mar. 1995) – Lord of Illusions
- Issue 141 (Apr. 1995) – Hellraiser IV: Bloodline
- Issue 142 (May 1995) – Tales from the Hood
- Issue 143 (June 1995) – Village of the Damned
- Issue 144 (July 1995) – Species
- Issue 145 (Aug. 1995) – Godzilla vs. Destoroyah
- Issue 146 (Sept. 1995) – Screamers
- Issue 147 (Oct. 1995) – Halloween: The Curse of Michael Myers
- Issue 148 (Nov. 1995) – Vampire in Brooklyn

== 1996 ==
- Issue 149 (Jan. 1996) – From Dusk till Dawn
- Issue 150 (Mar. 1996) – 150th Issue Special Double-Issue; Tales from the Crypt: Bordello of Blood
- Issue 151 (Apr. 1996) – Tremors 2: Aftershocks
- Issue 152 (May 1996) – Thinner
- Issue 153 (June 1996) – The Craft
- Issue 154 (July 1996) – The Frighteners
- Issue 155 (Aug. 1996) – The Crow: City of Angels
- Issue 156 (Sept. 1996) – The Island of Dr. Moreau
- Issue 157 (Oct. 1996) – The Dentist
- Issue 158 (Nov. 1996) – Bad Moon

== 1997 ==
- Issue 159 (Jan. 1997) – Mars Attacks!
- Issue 160 (Mar. 1997) – The Relic
- Issue 161 (Apr. 1997) – Hemoglobin
- Issue 162 (May 1997) – The Shining
- Issue 163 (June 1997) – The Lost World: Jurassic Park
- Issue 164 (July 1997) – The Lost World: Jurassic Park
- Issue 165 (Aug. 1997) – Event Horizon
- Issue 166 (Sept. 1997) – Spawn
- Issue 167 (Oct. 1997) – Wishmaster
- Issue 168 (Nov. 1997) – Starship Troopers

== 1998 ==
- Issue 169 (Jan. 1998) – Alien Resurrection
- Issue 170 (Mar. 1998) – Deep Rising
- Issue 171 (Apr. 1998) – George Romero Returns
- Issue 172 (May 1998) – Species II
- Issue 173 (June 1998) – Godzilla
- Issue 174 (July 1998) – The Beyond
- Issue 175 (Aug. 1998) – Virus
- Issue 176 (Sept. 1998) – Vampires
- Issue 177 (Oct. 1998) – Phantasm IV: Oblivion
- Issue 178 (Nov. 1998) – Bride of Chucky

== 1999 ==
- Issue 179 (Jan. 1999) – Psycho
- Issue 180 (Mar. 1999) – Buffy the Vampire Slayer
- Issue 181 (Apr. 1999) – Wishmaster 2: Evil Never Dies
- Issue 182 (May 1999) – The Mummy
- Issue 183 (June 1999) – Candyman: Day of the Dead
- Issue 184 (July 1999) – The Haunting
- Issue 185 (Aug. 1999) – Deep Blue Sea
- Issue 186 (Sept. 1999) – Stir of Echoes
- Issue 187 (Oct. 1999) – House on Haunted Hill
- Issue 188 (Nov. 1999) – Sleepy Hollow

== 2000 ==
- Issue 189 (Jan. 2000) – Scream 3
- Issue 190 (Mar. 2000) – Pitch Black
- Issue 191 (Apr. 2000) – American Psycho
- Issue 192 (May 2000) – Buffy the Vampire Slayer
- Issue 193 (June 2000) – Special Report: Horror on DVD
- Issue 194 (July 2000) – Hollow Man
- Issue 195 (Aug. 2000) – Godzilla 2000
- Issue 196 (Sept. 2000) – The Cell
- Issue 197 (Oct. 2000) – The Exorcist
- Issue 198 (Nov. 2000) – Book of Shadows: Blair Witch 2

== 2001 ==
- Issue 199 (Jan. 2001) – House of 1000 Corpses
- Issue 200 (Mar. 2001) – 200th Issue Special
- Issue 201 (Apr. 2001) – Bruiser
- Issue 202 (May 2001) – The Mummy Returns
- Issue 203 (June 2001) – Special Issue: Japan's Scary New Movies; Ring 0: Birthday
- Issue 204 (July 2001) – Jurassic Park III
- Issue 205 (Aug. 2001) – Planet of the Apes
- Issue 206 (Sept. 2001) – Jeepers Creepers
- Issue 207 (Oct. 2001) – Creature Features
- Issue 208 (Nov. 2001) – Thirteen Ghosts

== 2002 ==
- Issue 209 (Jan. 2002) – The Lord of the Rings
- Issue 210 (Mar. 2002) – Queen of the Damned
- Issue 211 (Apr. 2002) – Blade II
- Issue 212 (May 2002) – Jason X
- Issue 213 (June 2002) – Dagon
- Issue 214 (July 2002) – Halloween: Resurrection; Eight Legged Freaks
- Issue 215 (Aug. 2002) – FeardotCom
- Issue 216 (Sept. 2002) – Red Dragon
- Issue 217 (Oct. 2002) – Ghost Ship
- Issue 218 (Nov. 2002) – The Lord of the Rings: The Two Towers

== 2003 ==
- Issue 219 (Jan. 2003) – House of 1000 Corpses
- Issue 220 (Mar. 2003) – Darkness Falls
- Issue 221 (Apr. 2003) – Dreamcatcher
- Issue 222 (May 2003) – Beyond Re-Animator
- Issue 223 (June 2003) – 28 Days Later
- Issue 224 (July 2003) – Cabin Fever
- Issue 225 (Aug. 2003) – Freddy vs. Jason
- Issue 226 (Sept. 2003) – Jeepers Creepers 2
- Issue 227 (Oct. 2003) – Kill Bill
- Issue 228 (Nov. 2003) – Gothika

== 2004 ==
- Issue 229 (Jan. 2004) – The Lord of the Rings: The Return of the King
- Issue 230 (Mar. 2004) – Dawn of the Dead
- Issue 231 (Apr. 2004) – Hellboy
- Issue 232 (May 2004) – Van Helsing
- Issue 233 (June 2004) – Salem's Lot
- Issue 234 (July 2004) – Alien vs. Predator
- Issue 235 (Aug. 2004) – Exorcist: The Beginning
- Issue 236 (Sept. 2004) – Saw
- Issue 237 (Oct. 2004) – Shaun of the Dead
- Issue 238 (Nov. 2004) – Seed of Chucky

== 2005 ==
- Issue 239 (Jan. 2005) – Blade: Trinity
- Issue 240 (Feb. 2005) – Constantine
- Issue 241 (Mar. 2005) – Cursed
- Issue 242 (Apr. 2005) – The Ring Two
- Issue 243 (May 2005) – House of Wax
- Issue 244 (June 2005) – Land of the Dead
- Issue 245 (Aug. 2005) – The Devil's Rejects
- Issue 246 (Sept. 2005) – Cry Wolf
- Issue 247 (Oct. 2005) – The Fog
- Issue 248 (Nov. 2005) – Doom

== 2006 ==
- Issue 249 (Jan. 2006) – King Kong
- Issue 250 (Feb. 2006) – 250th Issue Special
- Issue 251 (Mar. 2006) – The Hills Have Eyes
- Issue 252 (Apr. 2006) – Slither
- Issue 253 (May 2006) – Silent Hill
- Issue 254 (June 2006) – The Descent
- Issue 255 (Aug. 2006) – Snakes on a Plane
- Issue 256 (Sept. 2006) – The Texas Chainsaw Massacre: The Beginning
- Issue 257 (Oct. 2006) – Feast
- Issue 258 (Nov. 2006) – Saw II

== 2007 ==
- Issue 259 (Jan. 2007) – Pan's Labyrinth
- Issue 260 (Feb. 2007) – The Hills Have Eyes 2
- Issue 261 (Mar. 2007) – Grindhouse
- Issue 262 (Apr. 2007) – Quentin Tarantino, Grindhouse
- Issue 263 (May 2007) – 28 Weeks Later
- Issue 264 (June 2007) – Hostel: Part II
- Issue 265 (Aug. 2007) – Halloween
- Issue 266 (Sept. 2007) – Resident Evil: Extinction
- Issue 267 (Oct. 2007) – 30 Days of Night
- Issue 268 (Nov. 2007) – The Mist

== 2008 ==
- Issue 269 (Jan. 2008) – Aliens vs. Predator: Requiem
- Issue 270 (Feb. 2008) – Diary of the Dead
- Issue 271 (Mar. 2008) – Doomsday
- Issue 272 (Apr. 2008) – The Ruins
- Issue 273 (May 2008) – The Midnight Meat Train
- Issue 274 (June 2008) – Hellboy II: The Golden Army
- Issue 275 (Aug. 2008) – Mirrors
- Issue 276 (Sept. 2008) – Jack Brooks: Monster Slayer
- Issue 277 (Oct. 2008) – Quarantine
- Issue 278 (Nov. 2008) – Saw V

== 2009 ==
- Issue 279 (Jan. 2009) – The Unborn
- Issue 280 (Feb. 2009) – Friday the 13th
- Issue 281 (Mar. 2009) – Martyrs
- Issue 282 (Apr. 2009) – Laid to Rest
- Issue 283 (May 2009) – Drag Me to Hell
- Issue 284 (June 2009) – 30th Anniversary Issue; Cover by Clive Barker
- Issue 285 (Aug. 2009) – Halloween II
- Issue 286 (Sept. 2009) – Jennifer's Body
- Issue 287 (Oct. 2009) – Zombieland
- Issue 288 (Nov. 2009) – The Twilight Saga: New Moon

== 2010 ==
- Issue 289 (Jan. 2010) – Daybreakers
- Issue 290 (Feb. 2010) – The Wolfman
- Issue 291 (Mar. 2010) – The Crazies
- Issue 292 (Apr. 2010) – Survival of the Dead
- Issue 293 (May. 2010) – The Descent Part 2
- Issue 294 (June 2010) – Splice
- Issue 295 (Aug. 2010) – Splatterhouse
- Issue 296 (Sept. 2010) – Resident Evil: Afterlife 3D
- Issue 297 (Oct. 2010) – The Walking Dead
- Issue 298 (Nov. 2010) – Gene Simmons

== 2011 ==
- Issue 299 (Jan. 2011) – Black Swan
- Issue 300 (Feb. 2011) – 300th Issue Special
- Issue 301 (Mar. 2011) – Richard Matheson
- Issue 302 (Apr. 2011) – Insidious
- Issue 303 (May 2011) – John Carpenter
- Issue 304 (June 2011) – Tom Savini
- Issue 305 (Aug. 2011) – Amicus
- Issue 306 (Sept. 2011) – Creature
- Issue 307A (Oct. 2011) – Special Double Cover Issue; Alice Cooper
- Issue 307B (Oct. 2011) – Special Double Cover Issue; The Howling
- Issue 308 (Nov. 2011) – Dracula 3D

== 2012 ==
- Issue 309 (Jan. 2012) – David Cronenberg
- Issue 310 (Feb. 2012) – Nicolas Cage, Ghost Rider: Spirit of Vengeance
- Issue 311 (Mar. 2012) – Roger Corman: The Poe cycle
- Issue 312 (Apr. 2012) – The Cabin in the Woods
- Issue 313 (May 2012) – Dark Shadows
- Issue 314 (June 2012) – Debbie Rochon
- Issue 315 (Aug. 2012) – Twin Peaks
- Issue 316 (Sept. 2012) – Resident Evil: Retribution
- Issue 317 (Oct. 2012) – Barbara Crampton Explores the Macabre Mind of Stuart Gordon
- Issue 318 (Nov. 2012) – Silent Hill: Revelation

== 2013 ==
- Issue 319 (Jan. 2013) – Django Unchained
- Issue 320 (Feb. 2013) – Mama
- Issue 321 (Mar. 2013) – Brian De Palma, Carrie
- Issue 322 (Apr. 2013) – Evil Dead
- Issue 323 (May 2013) – The Lords of Salem
- Issue 324 (June 2013) – Castlevania: Lords of Shadow 2
- Issue 325 (Aug. 2013) – Jess Franco Remembered
- Issue 326 (Sept. 2013) – Frankenstein's Army
- Issue 327 (Oct. 2013) – Curse of Chucky; Carrie
- Issue 328 (Nov. 2013) – Roger Corman

== 2014 ==
- Issue 329 (Jan. 2014) – The Exorcist
- Issue 330 (Feb. 2014) – Nightbreed
- Issue 331 (Mar. 2014) – Bill Moseley
- Issue 332 (May 2014) – Under the Skin
- Issue 333 (June 2014) – Godzilla
- Issue 334 (July 2014) – Nosferatu the Vampyre
- Issue 335 (Aug. 2014) – Phantom of the Paradise
- Issue 336 (Oct. 2014) – The Evil Within
- Issue 337 (Nov. 2014) – Wes Craven
- Issue 338 (Dec. 2014) – Norman Reedus

== 2015 ==
- Issue 339 (Feb. 2015) – The Music of John Carpenter
- Issue 340 (Mar. 2015) – Phenomena
- Issue 341 (Apr. 2015) – It Follows
- Issue 342 (Aug. 2015) – Barbara Steele
- Issue 343 (Sep. 2015) – Hannibal
- Issue 344 (Oct. 2015) – Elvira
- Issue 345 (Unpublished) – Krampus

== 2018 ==
- Volume 2 Issue 1 (Oct. 2018) – Halloween

== 2019 ==
- Volume 2 Issue 2 (Jan. 2019) – Joe Bob Briggs
- Volume 2 Issue 3 (Apr. 2019) – Us
- Volume 2 Issue 4 (July 2019) – Midsommar
- Volume 2 Issue 5 (Oct. 2019) – Creepshow

== 2020 ==
- Volume 2 Issue 6 (Jan. 2020) – VFW
- Volume 2 Issue 7 (Apr. 2020) – Saint Maud; The Hunt
- Volume 2 Issue 8 (July 2020) – Who Would Win? by Patton Oswalt
- Volume 2 Issue 9 (Oct. 2020) – Freaky

== 2021 ==
- Volume 2 Issue 10 (Jan. 2021) – Mary Lou Maloney
- Volume 2 Issue 11 (Apr. 2021) – Jakob's Wife
- Volume 2 Issue 12 (July 2021) – Subscriber: Werewolves Within Newsstand: Candyman
- Volume 2 Issue 13 (Oct. 2021) – Subscriber: Halloween Kills Newsstand: The Boulet Brothers' Dragula

== 2022 ==
- Volume 2 Issue 14 (Jan. 2022) – Subscriber: Stab Newsstand: The Black Phone
- Volume 2 Issue 15 (Apr. 2022) – Subscriber: X Newsstand: Jurassic World Dominion
- Volume 2 Issue 16 (July 2022) – Subscriber: The Weeknd Newsstand: Nope
- Volume 2 Issue 17 (Oct. 2022) – Subscriber: Halloween Ends Newsstand: Hellraiser

== 2023 ==
- Volume 2 Issue 18 (Jan. 2023) – Subscriber: Leatherface: The Texas Chainsaw Massacre III Trailer Newsstand: M3GAN
- Volume 2 Issue 19 (Apr. 2023) – Subscriber: Evil Dead Rise Newsstand: Renfield
- Volume 2 Issue 20 (July 2023) – Subscriber: Talk to Me Newsstand: The Last Voyage of the Demeter
- Volume 2 Issue 21 (Oct. 2023) – Subscriber: Suitable Flesh Newsstand: Saw X

== 2024 ==
- Volume 2 Issue 22 (Winter 2024) – Subscriber: It's a Wonderful Knife Newsstand: Blackout
- Volume 2 Issue 23 (Spring 2024) – Subscriber: Chucky Newsstand: Abigail
- Volume 2 Issue 24 (Summer 2024) – Subscriber: Longlegs Newsstand: MaXXXine 45th Anniversary Variant Cover: Alien: Romulus
- Volume 2 Issue 25 (Fall 2024) – Subscriber: A Nightmare on Elm Street Newsstand: Terrifier 3

== 2025 ==
- Volume 2 Issue 26 (Winter 2025) – Subscriber: Nosferatu Newsstand: Nosferatu
- Volume 2 Issue 27 (Spring 2025) – Subscriber: David Lynch Newsstand: Sinners
- Volume 2 Issue 28 (Summer 2025) – Subscriber: The Toxic Avenger Newsstand: 28 Years Later
- Volume 2 Issue 29 (Fall 2025) – Subscriber: Queens of the Dead Newsstand: Predator: Badlands

== 2026 ==
- Volume 2 Issue 30 (Winter 2026) – Subscriber: Send Help
