= AggieCon =

Student-run convention at Texas A&M University

- Status: Active
- Genre: Science fiction
- Venue: Texas A&M University
- Locations: College Station, Texas
- Country: United States
- Inaugurated: 1969
- Organizer: Cepheid Variable
- Filing status: Student organization
- Website: http://cepheid.org/aggiecon

AggieCon is the oldest student-run multigenre convention in the United States. Held annually since 1969 by Cepheid Variable at Texas A&M University's Memorial Student Center, it has grown to become one of the larger conventions in Texas. AggieCon was the first science fiction convention ever sponsored by a college or a college affiliate student organization.

The convention is known for its relaxed atmosphere, where guests and attendees can sit and chat on the couches outside the dealers' room and art show. The scope of AggieCon ranges from science fiction to fantasy to horror, and encompasses literature, graphic arts, and general media. Activities and events include panel discussions, costume contest, the Rocky Horror Picture Show, dealer's room, art show, and much gaming, including LARPing.

Some former Cepheid Variable members have gone on to become science fiction/fantasy writers, including Martha Wells, Jayme Blaschke, and Steven Gould.

In 1969, Harlan Ellison was Guest of Honor at AggieCon I. An outspoken opponent of the Vietnam War, Ellison reportedly referred to Texas A&M's Corps of Cadets as "America's next generation of Nazis." Between Ellison's anti-military remarks and his involvement in a food fight in the Ramada Inn ballroom, Cepheid Variable was temporarily dissolved as a club before reorganizing in 1970. Ellison returned in 1974 as Guest of Honor at AggieCon V.

Cepheid Variable was named the 2006 Registered Student Organization of the Year at Texas A&M. Among the cited reasons for the award were the $1,500 they donate each year to Scotty's House Child Advocacy Center and the creation of "S.O.S.," a tutoring program for Cepheids that aims to increase the club's academic status on campus. Cepheid advisor James "Spanky" Smith won an award for being the advisor of the year during the same ceremony.

== Current data ==
AggieCon 54 was held on February 1-2, 2025, at the Memorial Student Center on the Texas A&M University Campus. The convention featured video game and trading card game tournaments, such as Magic The Gathering and Super Smash Bros, a cosplay contest, performances, panels, a variety of guests, board game and role-playing game events, and a charity auction benefitting Scotty's House.

== Past conventions ==
(GoH: Guest of Honor)

1. Science Fiction Week (retroactively AggieCon I) – April 21–24, 1969; GoH: Harlan Ellison
2. Cepheid Comics and Trade Convention (retroactively AggieCon II) – Spring 1970; no GoH
3. AggieCon III – April 7–9, 1972; The first convention to officially use the name AggieCon, no GoH
4. AggieCon IV – March 2–4, 1973; GoH: Jack Williamson, Chad Oliver, Robert E. Vardeman, Joe Pumilia
5. AggieCon V – April 12–14, 1974; GoH: Harlan Ellison, Keith Laumer, Howard Waldrop
6. AggieCon VI – March 28–30, 1975; Larry Niven, Fan GoH: "Fuzzy Pink" Niven
7. AggieCon VII – March 26–28, 1976; Anne McCaffrey
8. AggieCon VIII – March 24–27, 1977; Fred Pohl
9. AggieCon IX – March 30 – April 2, 1978; GoH: Damon Knight, Wilson "Bob" Tucker, Alan Dean Foster, Geo. W. Proctor, Bob Vardeman
10. AggieCon X – March 29 – April 1, 1979; GoH: Theodore Sturgeon, Boris Vallejo, Wilson "Bob" Tucker
11. AggieCon XI – March 27–30, 1980; GoH: Poul Anderson, Jack Williamson, Katherine Kurtz, Frank Kelly Freas
12. AggieCon XII – March 26–29, 1981; GoH: Joe Haldeman, Alicia Austin, C. J. Cherryh
13. AggieCon XIII – March 25–28, 1982; GoH: Roger Zelazny, Artist GoH: Vincent Di Fate, Special GoH: Fred Saberhagen
14. AggieCon XIV – March 24–27, 1983; GoH: Harry Harrison, Michael Whelan, Stephen R. Donaldson, Chad Oliver
15. AggieCon XV – March 29 – April 1, 1984; GoH: L. Sprague de Camp, Catherine Crook de Camp, Don Maitz, Wilson "Bob" Tucker, James P. Hogan
16. AggieCon XVI – March 21–24, 1985; GoH: John Varley, James Christensen, Ed Bryant, Patricia McKillip
17. AggieCon XVII – April 3–6, 1986; GoH: George R. R. Martin, Frank Kelly Freas, Orson Scott Card, Howard Waldrop, Kerry O'Quinn. Convention Chairman was Martha Wells
18. AggieCon XVIII – April 2–5, 1987; GoH: Ben Bova, Christopher Stasheff, Rowena Morrill, Steve Gould, Kerry O'Quinn
19. AggieCon XIX – March 24–27, 1988; Joe Haldeman, Katherine Kurtz, Bob Eggleton, Kerry O'Quinn
20. AggieCon XX – March 30 - April 2, 1989; GoH: George R.R. Martin, Octavia Butler
21. AggieCon XXI – March 29 – April 1, 1990; GoH: Walter Koenig, Spider Robinson, Jeanne Robinson, Richard Pini
22. AggieCon XXII – March 21–24, 1991; GoH: Fred Saberhagen, Keith Parkinson, Larry Elmore, Marv Wolfman, Elizabeth Ann Scarborough
23. AggieCon XXIII – March 26–29, 1992; GoH: David Drake, Barbara Hambly, Julius Schwartz, Real Musgrave, Kerry O'Quinn
24. AggieCon XXIV – March 25–28, 1993; GoH: Peter David, Michael Moorcock, Wendy Pini, Charles N. Brown
25. AggieCon XXV – March 24–27, 1994; GoH: Greg Bear, Lois McMaster Bujold, Charles de Lint, Julius Schwartz, Frank Kelly Freas, Laura Brodian Kelly-Freas
26. AggieCon XXVI – March 23–26, 1995; GoH: Jim Baen, John Byrne
27. AggieCon XXVII – March 21–24, 1996; GoH: Bernie Wrightson, Nancy Collins, Joe Christ, Dave Wolverton, Kerry O'Quinn, Richard Biggs, Kevin J. Anderson, Rebecca Moesta, Gwar
28. AggieCon XXVIII – March 20–23, 1997; GoH: Brian Stelfreeze
29. AggieCon XXIX – March 26–29, 1998; GoH: Robert Asprin, Joe R. Lansdale, Tad Williams, Phil & Kaja Foglio, Garth Ennis, John McCrea
30. AggieCon XXX – March 25–28, 1999; GoH: Bruce Sterling, Larry Elmore, Nigel Bennett, Ted Raimi
31. AggieCon XXXI – March 23–26, 2000; GoH: Harlan Ellison, Terry Pratchett, Tim Bradstreet
32. AggieCon XXXII – March 22–25, 2001; GoH: Charles de Lint, Melanie Rawn, Martha Wells, Julie Caitlin Brown. Convention director was Yaru Liu.
33. AggieCon XXXIII – March 21–24, 2002; GoH was Neil Gaiman, Artist GoH was Charles Keegan, and other notable guests included Joe R. Lansdale, John Lucas, Brian Stelfreeze, and Karen Lansdale. Convention director was Yaru Liu.
34. AggieCon XXXIV – March 20–23, 2003; GoH: Virginia Hey, Lani Tupu, Ruth Thompson, Peter David
35. AggieCon XXXV – March 25–28, 2004; GoH: Jacqueline Carey, Todd McCaffrey
36. AggieCon XXXVI – April 21–24, 2005; GoH: Michael Moorcock, Elizabeth Moon, Red vs. Blue
37. AggieCon XXXVII – March 23–26, 2006; GoH: Steven Brust, James Charles Leary, Peter Mayhew, Brian Stelfreeze
38. AggieCon XXXVIII – March 22–25, 2007; GoH: Gene Wolfe (Wolfe cancelled at the last minute and did not attend), James O'Barr, Richard Hatch, Ruth Thompson
39. AggieCon XXXIX – March 27–30, 2008; GoH: Ellen Muth
40. AggieCon XL – March 26–29, 2009; GoH: Todd McCaffrey, Kristen Perry, Jennifer Rhodes
41. AggieCon XLI (held at the College Station Hilton Hotel) – February 5–7, 2010; GoH: Steven Gould, AGoH: David Lee Anderson, SG: Martha Wells, Editor GoH: Ellen Datlow, Toastmaster: Selina Rosen, Media GoH: Marv Wolfman, SG: Noel Wolfman
42. AggieCon XLII (held at the College Station Hilton Hotel) – March 25-27, 2011; GoH: Catherynne M. Valente, John Joseph Adams, John Mørke, Martin Whitmore, James Grant & Mel Hynes, Airship Isabella
43. AggieCon XLIII (held at the College Station Hilton Hotel) – March 23–25, 2012
44. AggieCon XLIV (held at the College Station Hilton Hotel) – March 22–24, 2013; GOH: George R. R. Martin, Ernest Cline, Sam De La Rosa, Dante Shepherd, Barbara Ann Wright, Erin Ewer, Holden Shearer, David Liss, Keri Bean, and Area of Defect
45. AggieCon XLV (Held at the College Station Hilton Hotel) - April 4–6, 2014 GOH: Jeffrey Cranor, Aaron Dismuke, Airship Nikolai, Ed Wetterman, and Marc Gunn.
46. AggieCon XLVI (Held at the College Station Hilton Hotel) - March 27–29, 2015 GOH: Mark Stefanowicz, Ed Wetterman, Lewis "Linkara" Lovhaug, Kathryn Friesen, Kimberley Hix Trant.
47. AggieCon XLVII (Held at the Brazos Valley Expo Center) - April 1-3, 2016
48. AggieCon XLVIII (Held at the Brazos Valley Expo Center) - March 24-26, 2017
49. AggieCon LI (Held at Rudder Tower on the Texas A&M campus) - March 25-27, 2022 Guests: Aaron Dismuke, John Swasey
50. AggieCon LII (Held at the Memorial Student Center on the Texas A&M Campus) - March 3-5, 2023
51. AggieCon LIII (Held at the Memorial Student Center on the Texas A&M Campus) - February 2-4. 2024 GOH: Bryson Baugus, Drew Breedlove, Alex Hom
