= The 100 Scariest Movie Moments =

2004 American television documentary

- Screenshot of the program
- Genre: Documentary
- Written by: Patrick Moses
- Directed by: Kevin Kaufman
- Starring: Wes Craven; Tobe Hooper; Peter Jackson; Guillermo Del Toro; John Carpenter; Sean S. Cunningham; George A. Romero; Stephen King; Mick Garris; Martin Scorsese; John Landis; Clive Barker; Stan Winston; Robert Englund; Heather Langenkamp; Ashley Laurence; Ron Perlman; Roger Corman; Dario Argento; Olivia Hussey; Brittany Daniel; Keiko Agena; Jordan Ladd; Dee Wallace; Danny Pintauro; Bruce Campbell; Tony Timpone; Linda Marotta; Amorette Jones; Rachael Robbins; Chela Johnson; Felissa Rose; Alanna Ubach; Debbie Matenopoulos; Hilarie Burton; Juliet Landau; Carol Kane; Pat Hitchcock; Krista Allen; Elizabeth Peña; Jennifer Tilly; Misty Mundae; Melinda Clarke; Mary Lambert; Betsy Palmer; Adrienne King; Ari Lehman; Deron Miller; Rider Strong; David A. Hess; Angus Scrimm; Don Coscarelli; Steve Niles; Peter Stickles; Eric Christian Olsen; Andrew Bryniarski; Rory Culkin; David Arquette; Courteney Cox; Elise Neal; Vanessa Lengies; Danielle Nicolet; Amber Benson; Jesse Falcon; James Eason; Lombardo Boyar; David J. Skal; Leland Orser; Joe Dante; Don Mancini; David Kirschner; Catherine Hicks; Kevin Yagher; Steven Schneider; Alan Jones; Bob Clark; Stuart Gordon; Dennis Paoli; Larry Cohen; William Lustig; Jami Bernard; Michael Dougherty; Peter Paulsen; Aviva Briefel; Dov Simens; Adam Rockoff; Ralis Kahn; Faith Salie; Kim Newman; Mark Kermode; Ramsey Campbell; Shade Rupe; Maitland McDonagh; Tony Todd; Xander Berkeley; Rutger Hauer; Sheri Moon Zombie; Rob Zombie; Eli Roth; Tom Savini; Lance Henriksen; Leonard Maltin; Gilbert Gottfried; Rob Reiner; Rob Riggle; Rob Huebel; Jacqui Malouf; Klimaszewski Twins; The Broken Lizards
- Country of origin: United States
- Original language: English
- No. of seasons: 1
- No. of episodes: 5

Production
- Executive producers: Kevin Kaufman; Ian Levy; Patrick Moses
- Producer: Anthony Timpone
- Editor: John Topol
- Running time: 60 minutes
- Production company: Kaufman Films

Original release
- Network: Bravo
- Release: October 26 – October 30, 2004

Related
- 30 Even Scarier Movie Moments

The 100 Scariest Movie Moments is an American television documentary miniseries or Halloween Television special that aired in late October 2004, on Bravo. Aired in five 60-minute segments, the miniseries counts down what producer Anthony Timpone, writer Patrick Moses, and director Kevin Kaufman have determined as the 100 most frightening and disturbing moments in the history of movies. Each segment includes interviews from horror genre experts and other celebrities who experienced the listed films, as well as film clips and movie stills from the films covered. This 2004 offering was followed up in 2006 by the two-part sequel, 30 Even Scarier Movie Moments, as well as another countdown in 2009, 13 Scarier Movie Moments.

In 2016, the New York Post Decider site called the series "the single best primer on horror cinema that has ever aired on TV."

== Summary ==
The countdown included 100 films, mainly from the 1970s to 2000s, although films from the 1960s and earlier are also featured. While the list mainly comprises horror and thriller films, science fiction films such as The Terminator and Jurassic Park are included. Even children's films, such as The Wizard of Oz and Willy Wonka & the Chocolate Factory, made their way onto the countdown.

The top five films included on the list were all from the 1960s and 1970s.

- The Texas Chain Saw Massacre ranked fifth for the scene in which Leatherface bashes Kirk's skull with a mallet.
- Psycho ranked number four for the death scene of the private investigator Arbogast falling downstairs backward.
- The Exorcist ranked third for the scene where the possessed Regan MacNeil's head spins clockwise during the Exorcism.
- Alien ranked second for the chestburster sequence.
- Jaws was placed at the number one spot for the opening scene in which the unseen shark devours Chrissie Watkins during a midnight swim.

== List ==
Film	Rank
Jaws	1
Alien	2
The Exorcist	3
Psycho	4
The Texas Chain Saw Massacre	5
The Shining	6
The Silence of the Lambs	7
Carrie	8
Night of the Living Dead	9
Wait Until Dark	10
Audition	11
Misery	12
Scream	13
Halloween	14
Freaks	15
The Omen	16
A Nightmare on Elm Street	17
The Haunting	18
Hellraiser	19
The Ring	20
Jacob's Ladder	21
Don't Look Now	22
Rosemary's Baby	23
Suspiria	24
Phantasm	25
Seven	26
Frankenstein	27
When a Stranger Calls	28
The Serpent and the Rainbow	29
The Blair Witch Project	30
Friday the 13th	31
Pet Sematary	32
The Fly	33
The Hitcher	34
Aliens	35
Cape Fear	36
House on Haunted Hill	37
Peeping Tom	38
Dawn of the Dead	39
Black Sunday	40
The Hills Have Eyes	41
An American Werewolf in London	42
It's Alive	43
The Game	44
The Wicker Man	45
The Sentinel	46
Nosferatu	47
The Thing	48
Les Diaboliques	49
The Last House on the Left	50
The Dead Zone	51
The Phantom of the Opera	52
Demons	53
The Changeling	54
The Vanishing	55
Single White Female	56
House of Wax	57
Cujo	58
Fatal Attraction	59
The Beyond	60
The Devil's Backbone	61
The Wolf Man	62
Deliverance	63
Near Dark	64
The Tenant	65
Marathon Man	66
Duel	67
The Black Cat	68
Re-Animator	69
The Stepfather	70
The Sixth Sense	71
Them!	72
Blood Simple	73
Willy Wonka & the Chocolate Factory	74
Candyman	75
The Evil Dead	76
Signs	77
The Brood	78
Dracula	79
Poltergeist	80
The Howling	81
The Terminator	82
The Others	83
Blue Velvet	84
Blood and Black Lace	85
The Wizard of Oz	86
Black Christmas	87
Invasion of the Body Snatchers	88
Alice, Sweet Alice	89
The Night of the Hunter	90
Shallow Grave	91
Village of the Damned	92
Child's Play	93
Pacific Heights	94
Jurassic Park	95
The Birds	96
Cat People	97
Zombi 2	98
Creepshow	99
28 Days Later	100

== British Show "The 100 Greatest Scary Moments" ==
In 2003, UK TV Channel 4 polled the British public for their "100 Greatest Scary Moments" as part of their 100 Greatest TV series. On October 25 and 26, 2003, the results were broadcast as "The 100 Greatest Scary Moments", presented by comedian Jimmy Carr. The list included entries from not just films, but TV programs, advertising, and music videos as well. This particular episode predates The 100 Scariest Movie Moments, and the more recent The 101 Scariest Horror Movie Moments of All Time on Shudder.

Ranking	Title	Year
100	L'Arrivée d'un train en gare de La Ciotat	1895
99	The Night of the Hunter	1955
98	Doomwatch	1970
97	Alien Autopsy	1995
96	The Prodigy - "Breathe" music video	1997
95	The Singing Ringing Tree	1957
94	Cat People	1942
93	The Thing From Another World	1951
92	The Stone Tape	1973
91	Star Wars - Darth Vader	1977
90	Dracula	1931
89	Protect and Survive (Public Information Film)	1975
88	The Day of the Triffids	1981
87	Cracker - Episodes 8 and 9 - "To Be A Somebody"	1993
86	Dead Of Night	1945
85	Peeping Tom	1960
84	Cape Fear	1962
83	Whistle and I'll Come to You (Omnibus)	1968
82	Captain Scarlet and the Mysterons - The voice of the Mysterons	1967
81	Brookside - The murder of Trevor Jordache	1995
80	Snow White and the Seven Dwarfs	1937
79	Nineteen Eighty-Four	1954
78	The Incredible Hulk	1978
77	The Twilight Zone - "Nightmare at 20,000 Feet"	1963
76	Children of the Stones	1976
75	Lonely Water (Public Information Film)	1973
74	The War Game	1965
73	Alice Cooper's appearances on Top of the Pops	1972
72	Frankenstein	1931
71	Michael Jackson's Thriller	1983
70	Quatermass and the Pit	1958
69	The Tripods	1984
68	Shallow Grave	1994
67	Misery	1990
66	Theatre of Blood	1973
65	Fatal Attraction	1987
64	Reservoir Dogs	1992
63	Armchair Thriller - "Quiet as a Nun"	1978
62	Suspiria	1977
61	Blue Velvet	1986
60	Basement Jaxx - "Where's Your Head At" music video	2002
59	Tales of the Unexpected - "Royal Jelly"	1979
58	Candyman	1992
57	EastEnders 2001 Christmas special - The abuse of Little Mo Mitchell	2001
56	Marathon Man	1976
55	Goodfellas	1990
54	Doctor Who - opening credits (1963)	1963
53	Night of the Living Dead	1968
52	V The Final Battle	1984
51	Rosemary's Baby	1968
50	Hammer House of Horror	1980
49	AIDS: Don't Die of Ignorance campaign	1986
48	Les Diaboliques	1955
47	Invasion Of The Body Snatchers	1956
46	Final Destination	2000
45	The Vanishing	1988
44	The War of the Worlds	1938
43	The Birds	1963
42	Salem's Lot	1979
41	Ghostwatch	1992
40	The Others	2001
39	Doctor Who - "The Daleks"	1963
38	Nosferatu	1922
37	Chitty Chitty Bang Bang	1968
36	Dracula: Prince of Darkness	1966
35	Aphex Twin - "Come to Daddy"	1997
34	The Wicker Man	1973
33	The Sixth Sense	1999
32	Coronation Street - The murder of Maxine Peacock by Richard Hillman	2003
31	Forrest advertisement for the alcopop drink, Metz	2001
30	Carry On Screaming!	1966
29	Poltergeist	1982
28	The Silence of the Lambs	1991
27	Carrie	1976
26	Jam - Episode 4 "Arrested for copying dogs"	2002
25	Buffy the Vampire Slayer	1997
24	The League Of Gentlemen Christmas Special - "Yule Never Leave"	2000
23	The Wizard of Oz	1939
22	Scream	1996
21	Twin Peaks - "Episode 29"	1990
20	Don't Look Now	1973
19	Hellraiser	1987
18	28 Days Later	2002
17	The Thing	1982
16	An American Werewolf In London	1981
15	Friday the 13th	1980
14	Seven	1995
13	The X-Files - "Squeeze"	1993
12	The Evil Dead	1981
11	Psycho	1960
10	A Nightmare on Elm Street	1984
9	The Omen	1976
8	The Texas Chain Saw Massacre	1974
7	Halloween	1978
6	Ring	1998
5	The Blair Witch Project	1999
4	Alien	1979
3	Jaws	1975
2	The Exorcist	1973
1	The Shining	1980

== Sequels ==
Produced by Sharp Entertainment, 30 Even Scarier Movie Moments, a two-part sequel to this title, aired on Bravo and Chiller in October 2006, with Hostel topping the list.

Film	Rank
Hostel	1
A Clockwork Orange	2
Saw	3
Videodrome	4
Oldboy	5
Vertigo	6
The Devil's Rejects	7
Land of the Dead	8
Open Water	9
Children of the Corn	10
The Stepford Wives	11
Wolf Creek	12
Dawn of the Dead	13
Scanners	14
The Exorcism of Emily Rose	15
Saw II	16
Christine	17
Army of Darkness	18
Fear	19
2001: A Space Odyssey	20
Braindead	21
American Psycho	22
Manhunter	23
The Hand That Rocks the Cradle	24
Red Eye	25
Play Misty for Me	26
Slither	27
Cabin Fever	28
Cape Fear	29
The Grudge	30

This was followed by Sharp Entertainment's 13 Scarier Movie Moments which aired in October 2009.

Film	Rank
The Descent	1
Henry: Portrait of a Serial Killer	2
Bug	3
Zodiac	4
Maniac	5
Ginger Snaps	6
Frailty	7
Diary of the Dead	8
Hostel Part II	9
No Country for Old Men	10
Hard Candy	11
Cloverfield	12
The Strangers	13

== See also ==
- Terror in the Aisles
- Clive Barker's A-Z of Horror
