= Future Life =

- cover of the magazine #3 (July 1978)
- Categories: Science fiction magazine, Science magazine
- Frequency: once every 1-2 months
- First issue: 1978
- Final issue: 1981
- Company: O'Quinn Studios
- Country: United States
- Based in: New York City

Future Life, known as Future in its first year, was a science and science fiction magazine published from 1978 to 1981 by O'Quinn Studios. In the first year of its existence, the magazine was called "Future", then the name was expanded to "Future Life". Contributors included Harlan Ellison, Ed Naha, Boris Vallejo, and many others. It covered futuristic topics - largely space travel - as well as current scientific events of the time, and featured reviews of science fiction movies, books and comics, as well as interviews with Arthur C. Clarke, Anne McCaffrey, Ray Bradbury and many other scientists, artists and authors. The magazine was based in New York City.

The 6th issue of the magazine (1978) is known for being one of the first places in which the concept of "longevity escape velocity" was publicly announced.

== Issues ==
- Future #1 (April 1978)
- Future #2 (May 1978)
- Future #3 (July 1978)
- Future #4 (August 1978)
- Future #5 (October 1978)
- Future #6 (November 1978)
- Future #7 (January 1979)
- Future #8 (February 1979)
- Future Life #9 (March 1979)
- Future Life #10 (May 1979)
- Future Life #11 (July 1979)
- Future Life #12 (August 1979)
- Future Life #13 (September 1979)
- Future Life #14 (November 1979)
- Future Life #15 (December 1979)
- Future Life #16 (February 1980)
- Future Life #17 (March 1980)
- Future Life #18 (May 1980)
- Future Life #19 (June 1980)
- Future Life #20 (August 1980)
- Future Life #21 (September 1980)
- Future Life #22 (November 1980)
- Future Life #23 (December 1980)
- Future Life #24 (February 1981)
- Future Life #25 (March 1981)
- Future Life #26 (May 1981)
- Future Life #27 (June 1981)
- Future Life #28 (August 1981)
- Future Life #29 (September 1981)
- Future Life #30 (November 1981)
- Future Life #31 (December 1981) - final issue

== Notable contributors ==
- Chesley Bonestell
- Kerry O'Quinn
- Neil Armstrong
- Harlan Ellison
- Ed Naha
- Jesco von Puttkamer
- Rick Baker
- Ron Miller
- Charles Bogle
- Joseph Kay
- Isaac Asimov
- Frederik Pohl
- George Pal
- Virginia Heinlein
- James Oberg
- Malcolm Brenner
- Norman Spinrad
- Gerard K. O'Neill
- Boris Vallejo
- Howard Cruse
- Ben Bova
- Bob McCall
- Ursula K. Le Guin
- Gerald Morris
- Carolyn Meinel
- Shusei Nagaoka
- David A. Hardy
- William F. Nolan
- Syd Mead
- Michael Dobson
- Robert Anton Wilson
- Gil Kane
- Michael Cassutt
- John Berkey
- Carol Rosin
- Charles Sheffield
- Michael Cassutt
- Luigi Cozzi
- Ted White
- Lou Stathis
- Ludek Pesek
- Jacques Cousteau
- Gerard K. O'Neill
- Don Davis
- Todd Rundgren
- G. Harry Stine
- Roger Zelazny
- John Billingham
- Chris Foss
- Robert Anton Wilson
- Jon Pareles
- Brian Aldiss
- T. A. Heppenheimer
- Jill Bauman
- Harry Harrison
- Jon Lomberg
- Steve Sansweet
- Herman Kahn
- F. M. Esfandiary

== Notable people interviewed ==
- Douglas Trumbull
- Arthur C. Clarke
- J. Allen Hynek
- Larry Niven
- William F. Nolan
- George Pal
- Joanna Russ
- Keith Henson
- Alvin Toffler
- Ray Bradbury
- Shusei Nagaoka
- Marion Zimmer Bradley
- David Gerrold
- Joe Haldeman
- Steven Spielberg
- Anne McCaffrey
- Gahan Wilson
- Christopher Reeve
- John Brunner
- A. E. van Vogt
- Leslie Stevens
- L. Sprague de Camp
- Jerry Pournelle
- Philip Kaufman
- Bjo Trimble
- Gregory Benford
- Gene Roddenberry
- Hal Clement
- Timothy Leary
- Robert Silverberg
- Larry Fast
- Vonda McIntyre
- John Varley
- Robert Jastrow
- Theodore Sturgeon
