= Fangoria =

American horror film fan magazine

- Fangoria, Issue 7; this was the first issue to exclusively feature horror content.
- Editor-in-Chief: Phil Nobile Jr.
- Categories: Horror; Fantasy (issue 1–6)
- Frequency: Quarterly
- Founded: 1979
- First issue: August 1979
- Company: Fangoria Publishing, LLC
- Country: United States
- Based in: Atlanta, Georgia
- Website: fangoria.com
- ISSN: 0164-2111
- OCLC: 4618144

Fangoria is an internationally distributed American horror film fan magazine, in publication since 1979. It is published four times a year by Fangoria Publishing, LLC and is edited by Phil Nobile Jr.

The magazine was originally released in an age when horror fandom was still a burgeoning subculture; in the late 1970s, most horror publications were concerned with classic cinema, while those that focused on contemporary horror were largely fanzines. Fangoria rose to prominence by running exclusive interviews with horror filmmakers and offering behind-the-scenes photos and stories that were otherwise unavailable to fans in the era before the Internet. The magazine would eventually rise to become a force itself in the horror world, hosting its own awards show, sponsoring and hosting numerous horror conventions, producing films, and printing its own line of comics.

Fangoria began struggling in the 2010s due to issues arising from the internet, including difficulty in generating enough ad revenue to cover printing costs. Publication became sporadic beginning in fall 2015, and the magazine ran through a succession of editors in 2015–2016, culminating with the February 2017 announcement of Ken Hanley's December 2016 departure. After this, the magazine ceased publication. The magazine remained dormant throughout 2017.

In February 2018, Dallas-based entertainment company Cinestate bought Fangoria and, under new editor-in-chief Phil Nobile Jr., relaunched the magazine as a print-based quarterly publication. In October 2018, Cinestate released the first new Fangoria magazine under their ownership, stylized as "Volume 2, Issue 1."

In August 2020, Tara Ansley and Abhi Goel acquired Fangoria from Cinestate under Fangoria Publishing, LLC, and, as of issue 9, are the publishers of the magazine and owners of the brand.

== Origins ==
Kerry O'Quinn and Norman Jacobs first conceived of Fangoria in 1978 by under the name Fantastica as a companion to their science fiction media magazine Starlog. Just as Starlog covered science fiction films for a primarily teenage audience, Fantastica was intended to cover fantasy films for a similar audience. O'Quinn, who had previously published soap opera fan magazines, anticipated a groundswell of interest in the fantasy genre due to Hollywood's plan to bring Robert E. Howard's Conan the Barbarian to the screen, although that movie would not appear for another four years.

The first issue was assembled under the editorship of "Joe Bonham", a pseudonym taken from the quadriplegic hero of Dalton Trumbo's pacifist novel Johnny Got His Gun. This was a cover for Rolling Stone contributor and screenwriter Ed Naha and writer Ric Meyers. Shortly after the publishing trade press announced the coming launch of Fantastica, the launch was delayed by several months when the publishers of a Starlog competitor, Fantastic Films magazine, threatened a lawsuit because of the similarity in titles. This was eventually decided in favor of the plaintiff in court.

Brainstorming sessions resulted in the name Fangoria, over the objections of Robert "Bob" Martin, who was hired as editor during the delay. The first issue went to print July 31, 1979, with an August cover date.

== Publication ==
=== Early years ===
The first issue of Fangoria was designed around the original "fantasy film" concept for the magazine and proved to be a notable publishing failure, as were the next five issues, all of which continued with the same approach. By the time issue four was released and issue six was in preparation, the publisher confided to Martin that the magazine was losing approximately US$20,000 per issue, an amount the small publisher could not sustain for long.

As described in one history of horror magazines, "The first issue of Fangoria, published in 1979, was an abysmal failure, and subsequent issues did not fare much better. Apparently there was little or no interest in another magazine that did not deviate much from the already established Starlog/Cinefantastique structure." But because of great reader interest in "a lavishly illustrated article on Tom Savini's gruesome make-up effects for the 1978 film Dawn of the Dead," the magazine began focusing on "readers' macabre interest in gory images of monsters and carnage." With the seventh issue, "with a bold shift to fright flicks by featuring a still from Stanley Kubrick's The Shining on the cover", the magazine had become profitable. Then "the 1980s gave rise to an endless offering of gory slasher films that Fangoria was more than happy to highlight, turning Freddy Krueger, Leatherface, Michael Myers and Jason Voorhees into unlikely lucrative newsstand idols."

Fangoria Italy, issue 1, 1990

Martin continued as editor into the mid-1980s, with co-editor David Everitt from 1981 to 1985. After Everitt left, he was replaced by Starlog editor David McDonnell, who handled both magazines, with Tony Timpone under him as managing editor on Fangoria. In 1986, Timpone became editor-in-chief:

I first joined the Fangoria staff in July of 1985. It was my first job out of college, although I had been freelancing to Fango's sister publication Starlog during my last year at college. I began as an Editorial Assistant to then-Editor David Everitt, who decided to move on a month after I started. Since I was fresh out of college and this was my first job in publishing, I was a little too green to take over the job myself. So I served as the Managing Editor to Dave McDonnell, who took over as Editor until I got my wings. The following year, I was promoted to Editor in Chief.

=== 1980s and 1990s ===
In the late 1980s and early 1990s, Fangoria tested numerous international horror markets, releasing issues of the magazine modified for various foreign languages. These foreign editions (released in Italy, Japan, Czechoslovakia and elsewhere) lasted only a handful of editions before being discontinued. Additionally, in May 1988, a sister publication titled Gorezone was first published. A second sister publication, titled Toxic Horror followed in 1989. Gorezone was cancelled after twenty-seven issues and one special Tales from the Crypt-themed issue. Toxic Horror was cancelled after five issues.

In 1990, Timpone brought in managing editor Michael Gingold, having been previously introduced to his horror-themed fanzine, Scareaphenalia. In addition to his editorial duties at the magazine, Gingold posted the majority of the news updates on the magazine's official website. Under Gingold and Timpone's tenure, Fangoria rose to its greatest level of prominence, enjoying widespread recognition and influence in the horror community.

=== 2000s ===
Creative Group purchased Fangoria (and its parent publication Starlog) in the early 2000s, hoping to expand the brand identity of the magazine to radio, television, and comics. On December 5, 2007, a warehouse operated by Kable News, in Oregon, Illinois, which contained all back issues of Fangoria and Starlog magazines, was destroyed by fire. As back issues of Fangoria are not reprinted, the only remaining back issues are now housed in private collections or those available on the secondary market. After several failed ventures, Creative Group filed for Chapter 11 on March 21, 2008. In summer 2008, The Brooklyn Company, Inc., led by longtime Fangoria president Thomas DeFeo, bought Fangoria and all its related brands. Under DeFeo's ownership, the magazine overhauled the magazine's cover format, including the transformation of the company's long-standing logo. Starting with issue #281, the original Fangoria logo was redesigned, and the trademark "film strip", tagline, and embedded photos were removed. After consistent fan protest of the changes, the original logo returned with issue #305. The "film strip" photos returned briefly, beginning with issue #309.

In February 2010, Chris Alexander, a Toronto-based filmmaker and former writer for Rue Morgue, succeeded Tony Timpone as Fangoria's new editor. Under his management, the magazine explored more esoteric genre content, had its cover layout altered a few times, and hired several new staff members. Alexander also brought back the original Fangoria logo. In 2011, Gorezone was revived with a special The Bloody Best of Gorezone issue before resuming regular publication with issue #28 in 2013. In 2012, Fangoria also began publishing a line of limited edition specials titled Fangoria Legends.

=== 2015 print cessation ===
In late September 2015, Alexander stepped down as editor-in-chief and left the Fangoria staff. By October, Gingold, who was then serving as managing editor, was hired as the publication's new editor-in-chief. Eight months later, Gingold was fired after twenty-eight years with the magazine and the former managing editor, Ken Hanley, was named the new editor-in-chief. Many within the horror community responded with shock at Gingold's termination and took it as a sign that the magazine had both lost touch with its fanbase and passed its glory days; Guillermo del Toro took to social media to voice his disappointment with the decision.

On February 11, 2017, Hanley announced that he too was no longer involved with the magazine and that he had been on hiatus from the company since mid-December 2016. He also stated that he felt that if the magazine remained under its current ownership, there would likely never be another new issue, especially as a print edition.

The last print edition of the magazine, issue #344, was released in October 2015. After that issue, four additional issues were published exclusively in a digital format, leaving subscribers of the hard copy editions, as well as Gorezone subscribers, without the issues they paid for. Additionally, contributors such as Josh Hadley have stated that they remain unpaid for published articles and artwork. Fangoria responded to the statements made by Hanley and Hadley on February 13, in which president and owner Tom DeFeo thanked readers and subscribers for their patience and noted his intention to make amends with writers, artists, and subscribers that had been inconvenienced. The statement also noted that the lack of sufficient ad revenue had been the reason for the disappearance of print editions, but that DeFeo and his staff would continue their attempts to bring print editions back.

=== Cinestate acquisition and return to print ===
In February 2018, it was announced that Fangoria had been purchased by film producer Dallas Sonnier through his Texas-based entertainment company Cinestate. Sonnier named Phil Nobile Jr., of the Birth.Movies.Death. website, as its new editor-in-chief. The company further announced that they would bring back the magazine as a quarterly, exclusively print-based publication, and offer a one-year free subscription to anyone who had never received the issues to which they were entitled under the old ownership.

In addition to Gingold and Timpone returning as regular columnists, Cinestate further announced that the new writing staff would be composed of S. Craig Zahler, Grady Hendrix, Shudder curator Sam Zimmerman, Birth.Movies.Death's Meredith Borders, author and former Rue Morgue magazine writer Preston Fassel, horror historian Rebekah McKendry, and black feminist critic Ashlee Blackwell. Cinestate planned on branching the franchise into producing films, podcasts and novels.

On May 19, 2018, the magazine announced its first licensed novel, Preston Fassel's Our Lady of the Inferno, under their new Fangoria Presents label. The book was released September 11, 2018, to generally positive reviews, ultimately being named one of the ten best horror novels of 2018 by Bloody Disgusting. A week later, on September 18, Fangoria released their second licensed novel, Michael J. Seidlinger's My Pet Serial Killer.

In October 2018, Cinestate published their first issue of the magazine, stylized as "Volume 2, Issue 1," featuring a cover story on the 2018 film Halloween.

=== Cinestate controversy and new ownership ===
In June 2020, The Daily Beast published an exposé about producer Adam Donaghey's sexual misconduct on the set of a Cinestate film.

In August 2020, Fangoria was acquired by Wanderwall Entertainment CEO Tara Ansley and entrepreneur Abhi Goel, and quarterly printing continued under their ownership. The new owners initially planned to launch a multimedia studio and produce and distribute fiction and non-fiction content. As of May 2025, Wanderwall has not released any multimedia content since their acquisition of the brand, with a primary focus on the release of the magazine and the annual Chainsaw Awards show.

== Other ventures ==
Starting in 1985, Fangoria branched out into other media outlets, including television, films, radio, and comic books.

Beginning in 1985, Fangoria has sponsored annual horror movie conventions known as the Weekend of Horrors in Los Angeles, New Jersey, and Chicago (with Austin, Texas, added in 2008). These conventions were produced in association with Creation Entertainment. After breaking ties with Creation in 2009, Fangoria began its own conventions, titling them the "Trinity of Terrors".

Fangoria's Blood Drive, Volume One

In 1990, Fangoria Films was created with the goal of financing one feature film a year under this banner. The first film was 1990's Mindwarp, starring Bruce Campbell. They created Children of the Night in 1991 and Severed Ties in 1992, then ceased production. In 1996, Fangoria Films re-emerged as a distribution company, occasionally using their "Gore Zone" label, to release twenty low-budget horror features over the next ten years. In 2004–2005, Fangoria Films produced and distributed Fangoria's Blood Drive, two DVD compilations of award-winning short horror films. The first volume was hosted by musician-turned-filmmaker Rob Zombie, and the second by MuchMusic's (now called FUSE) Mistress Juliya.

In 1991, Fangoria began honoring horror cinema with their annual Chainsaw Awards, which were voted on by readers of their magazine. The winners were announced at an awards show in Los Angeles, California, which was produced by Fangoria's managing editor, Michael Gingold. In association with FUSE TV, Fangoria first televised its Chainsaw Awards in 2006. The event occurred on October 15 and was aired on FUSE on October 22. The event was not renewed for 2007, although the awards continued in the magazine.

From 1999 to 2003, they partnered with Bedford Entertainment to attain wider releases of certain Fangoria titles. Movies released during this time included I, Zombie: A Chronicle of Pain, The Last Horror Movie, Slashers, and Dead Meat. Many of these films featured the Fangoria logo along the top of their video/DVD covers, while Fangoria's involvement in other releases was substantially more subdued.

From 2006 to 2009, Fangoria worked with Creative Group after it had purchased Fangoria in the early 2000s. Fangoria Entertainment was created as a result. This allowed both parties to agitate the Fangoria brand identity to a number of other media outlets in 2006. Creative Group also added a new "Vampire Skull" logo to Fangoria's properties, which was used extensively after its inception. In 2010, all of Creative Group's Fangoria brands were discontinued.

From 2006 to 2007, there was Fangoria TV. Originally conceived as a network television station dedicated to horror films, it was eventually modified to fit a limited online format. Austin television horror host Professor Griffin served as a horror host for Fangoria TV from 2005 to 2007.

From 2006 to 2009, there was Fangoria Radio. Debuting on Friday, June 23, 2006, it was a horror-themed talk radio program which aired on Sirius Radio Channel 108 and XM Radio Channel 139 on Friday nights. It was hosted by Dee Snider and Debbie Rochon, and regularly featured then-editor Tony Timpone.

In June 2007, Fangoria Comics was launched. For various reasons, the line abruptly ended a month later in August. Only two series were published: the two-issue series Fourth Horsemen, and the four-issue series Bump.

In 2018, under Cinestate, Fangoria's podcast network included the shows Shockwaves, Nightmare on Film Street, Post Mortem with Mick Garris, Casualty Friday, The Movie Crypt, and Nightmare University. Concurrently, Fangoria founded a literary imprint called FANGORIA Presents that published four novels between 2018 and 2020, including works by Mick Garris and Max Booth III; two additional experimental horror novels, Robert Ashcroft's The Megarothke and Jess Hagemann's Headcheese were published under a sister imprint but promoted through Fangoria. The podcast network disbanded, and the imprints were shut down following the 2020 controversy. In 2022, Mark Alan Miller acquired the publishing rights to five of the six books to be reprinted in new editions through his company Encyclopocalypse Publications.

In 2011 Fangoria partnered with producer Carl Amari to create Fangoria's Dreadtime Stories, a horror radio drama series hosted by Malcolm McDowell and featuring original music by Fangoria editor-in-chief Chris Alexander.

In late 2020, Fangoria debuted the shows Colors of the Dark and The KingCast on their podcast network.

At one point, said longtime editor Tony Timpone, Fangoria "almost did a 'Fango Junior', for the young adult/Goosebumps set."

== Fangoria.com ==
Until 2016, the Fangoria online site featured daily updates about the world of horror, allowing the Fangoria brand to remain relevant to those who do not typically read print magazines. The website also featured several specialized horror blogs, including articles that continued Fangoria's long tradition of being supportive of LGBT people working in the horror industry.

Following Cinestate's acquisition of Fangoria, the homepage briefly went offline, replaced eventually by a front page of aggregated news. This version of the site was discontinued once Cinestate sold the brand to Fangoria Publishing, LLC. Fangoria.com returned in 2021.

== Fangoria Chainsaw Awards ==
The Fangoria Chainsaw Awards are an award ceremony for horror films and thriller films. Beginning in 1992, the awards were expanded, and an annual ceremony was inaugurated to give out the awards.

== See also ==
- Cinefantastique
- Famous Monsters of Filmland
- Fangoria's Weekend of Horrors
- Rue Morgue (magazine)
- Scream (magazine)
- List of Covers of Fangoria Magazine
