= Fangoria's Weekend of Horrors =

Weekend of Horrors
- The 2007 logo for Weekend of Horrors
- Status: Active
- Genre: Horror
- Location: Rotating
- Country: United States
- Inaugurated: 1985
- Organizer: Fangoria
- Filing status: For Profit
- Website: www.creationent.com

Weekend of Horrors was traditionally a tri-annual (with occasionally more) traveling convention which focuses on horror films. Formerly produced in partnership with Creation Entertainment, the Weekend of Horrors show is now owned exclusively by Fangoria Magazine and is held once annually in Los Angeles, California.

The convention also deals in areas of the horror genre outside filmmaking, as well as exploitation, science fiction, and fantasy entertainment.

Fangoria magazine editor Tony Timpone was the Master of Ceremonies and co-producer of the shows during its time with Creation Entertainment.

== Convention layout ==
Weekend of Horrors conventions are typically composed of three areas:

- The Dealers' Area, which is made up primarily of vendors selling horror-themed merchandise and booths advertising films,
- The Auditorium, where panels and speeches are given for the duration of the convention,
- And The Screening Room, where new independent and mainstream horror films are screened via digital projection.

Some conventions also have Film Fests (occurring at neighboring theaters) and a Cocktail, or more recently, Dessert Party, where guests can casually mingle with horror personalities after-hours.

== Locations and dates ==
The Weekend of Horrors began in 1985, with its name and likeness owned by Creation Entertainment.

Starting with the 2006 Weekend of Horrors in Secaucus, New Jersey, the convention expanded from a two-day (Saturday and Sunday) event, to a three-day (including Friday). This expanded schedule, common for most current conventions, was continued for all future Weekend of Horrors.

Until 2008, Weekend of Horrors occurred annually in Rosemont, Illinois (Winter), Los Angeles, California (Spring), and New York City, New York (formerly Secaucus, New Jersey) (Summer), with an additional destination chosen based on the year (in 2008, Austin, Texas, was added to the circuit).

In 2009 Fangoria broke ties with Creation; the convention is now produced solely by Fangoria and is held once annually in Los Angeles, California.

== Notable guests ==
Notable guests at Weekend of Horrors conventions have included:

Fans attending Chicago's Weekend of Horrors convention, 2007

- 45 Grave
- David Arquette
- Lucio Fulci
- Clive Barker
- Reggie Bannister
- Lamberto Bava
- Thora Birch
- Uwe Boll
- Doug Bradley
- Bruce Campbell
- Jeffrey Combs
- Wes Craven
- Frank Darabont
- Shannon Elizabeth
- Robert Englund
- R. Lee Ermey
- Fashion Bomb
- Nathan Fillion
- Ken Foree
- Corey Haim
- Danielle Harris
- Doug Jones
- Lloyd Kaufman
- Adrienne King
- Stephen King
- Kristina Klebe
- Harry Knowles
- Heather Langenkamp
- G Tom Mac
- James Marsters
- Bill Moseley
- Russell Mulcahy
- Mushroomhead
- Paul Naschy
- Jack Nicholson
- Betsy Palmer
- Ron Perlman
- Robert Rodriguez
- Michael Roesch
- George A. Romero
- Eli Roth
- John Saxon
- Peter Scheerer
- Arnold Schwarzenegger
- Shawnee Smith
- Dee Snider
- Quentin Tarantino
- Tony Todd
- Caroline Williams
- Fred Williamson
- Jennifer Tilly
- Rob Zombie
