= Mark Governor =

American songwriter and composer

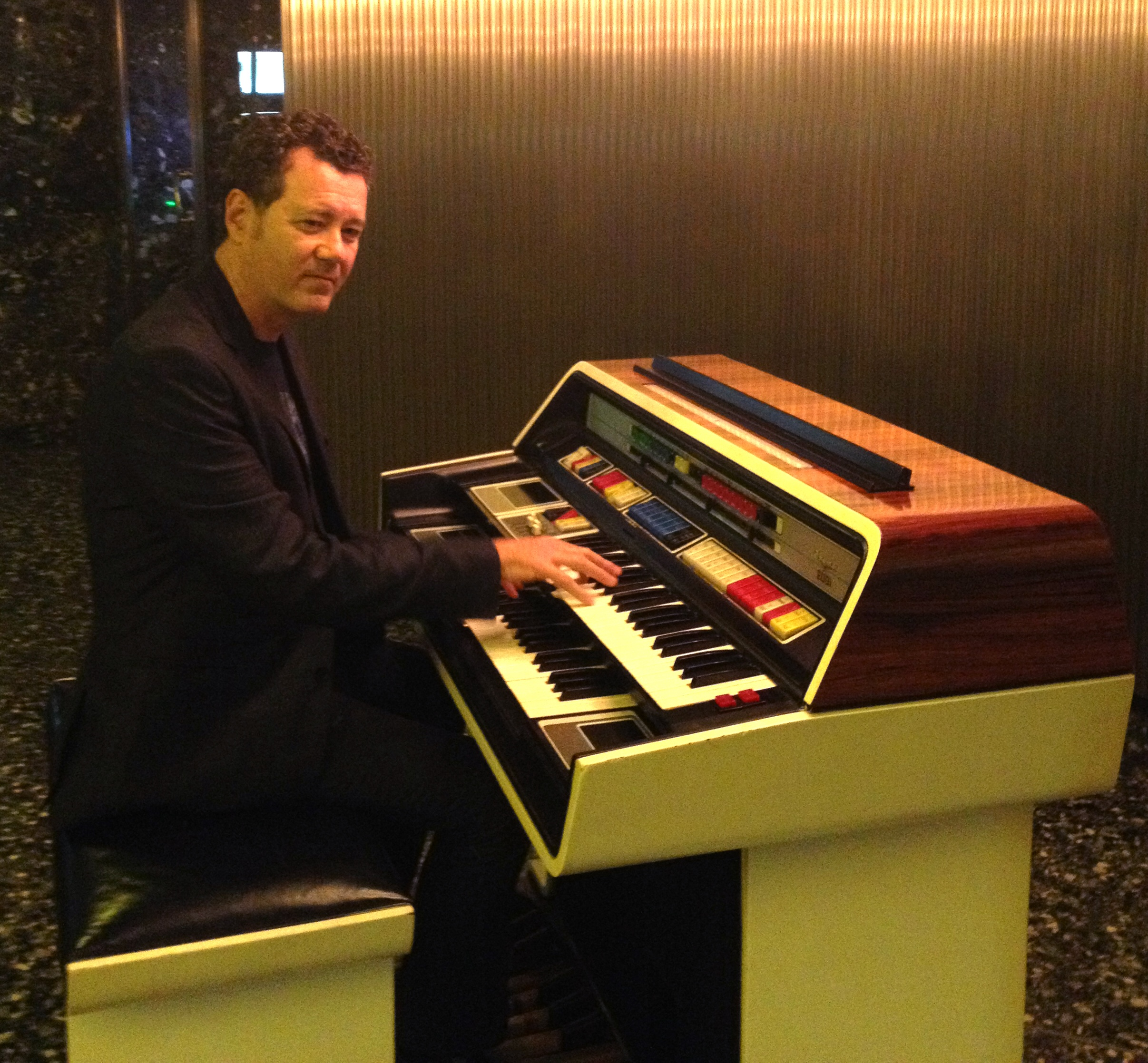
- Education: University of Massachusetts Boston
- Occupations: Composer, Producer, Writer
- Writing career
- Genres: soundtracks, pop, rock, fusion
- Website: markgovernor.com

Mark Governor is an American composer, producer, and songwriter known for fusing pop, rock, and orchestral music. He has contributed to over 20 films, including scoring Pet Sematary Two, Mindwarp, Masque of the Red Death, Notes From Underground, and extras for The Hobbit and The Lord of the Rings trilogies. His music has been featured in over 250 television shows including Friends, Brooklyn Nine-Nine, Modern Family, SpongeBob SquarePants, The Daily Show and Shameless. For theater, he has written the rock musical shAme, and co-wrote the Latin dance musical Possession with Marc Sambola.

== Early life ==
Governor was born in Boston and grew up in Needham, Massachusetts. He studied music at the University of Massachusetts Boston, worked at the university radio station, WUMB-FM, and graduated in 1978.

== Career ==
Governor moved to Los Angeles, CA in 1980 and studied film scoring at UCLA with Walter Scharf. In the early 1980s began scoring documentaries about old Hollywood including Ticket to Hollywood, The Divine Garbo, Hollywood Ghost Stories. In 1988, he began working for producer Roger Corman and scored five films for his New Horizon Studios, including Hollywood Boulevard II, Masque of the Red Death and Overexposed.

His first major studio film was scoring Pet Sematary II (1992) for director Mary Lambert. He then scored the independent films Notes From Underground and Santa Fe, both of which premiered at the Sundance Film Festival. This led to a collaboration with Iggy Pop on the score for The Brave, directed by Johnny Depp.

Governor simultaneously worked as a songwriter, artist and record producer, releasing his first compilation of original songs in 1995 for Sonoton Records. He has released over 12 albums in genres ranging from punk, grunge, EDM, pop, alternative. His album Notes From The Edge featured string quartet and vocal arrangements of rock and alternative classics. The track Stadium Rave Governor co-wrote with Glenn Nishida for their 1998 album Clubmix developed a cult following after being featured on the SpongeBob SquarePants episode, "Jellyfish Jam."

In 2008 he co-founded the Los Angeles Rock Opera Company with director-choreographer Janet Roston and co-directed it from 2008 to 2016.

He wrote the rock musical, shAme an adaptation of The Scarlet Letter by Nathaniel Hawthorne. From 2019 to 2022 ShAme was developed for Broadway with director Kathleen Marshall. It has had productions in Boston, Los Angeles and Berlin.

== Discography ==
=== Film Music Highlights ===
Film	Year of Release	Governor's Credit
One Last Time	2025	Composer
Downsizing	2017	Soundtrack cues
Crash Pad	2017	Composer - additional music
The Hobbit: The Battle of the Five Armies (Extended Edition)	2015	Composer and Music Supervisor for DVD Extras Documentaries
The Hobbit: The Desolation of Smaug (Extended Edition)	2014	Composer and Music Supervisor for DVD Extras Documentaries
The Hobbit: An Unexpected Journey (Extended Edition)	2013	Composer and Music Supervisor for DVD Extras Documentaries
Nebraska	2013	Soundtrack cues
The SpongeBob SquarePants Movie	2004	Soundtrack - "Stadium Rave"
Blindness	1998	Composer
The Players Club	1998	Arranger and Conductor
The Brave	1997	Composer, additional music; Arranger and Conductor
Santa Fe	1997	Composer
I Married a Strange Person	1997	Composer
Uncle Sam	1996	Composer
Notes from Underground	1995	Composer
Till the End of the Night	1995	Composer
Pet Sematary Two	1992	Composer
Mindwarp	1991	Composer
The Divine Garbo (TV Movie)	1990	Composer
Hollywood Boulevard II	1990	Composer
Masque of the Red Death	1989	Composer

=== Discography ===
Album Title	Year of Release	Artist	Governor's Role	Label
Uncle Sam	2026	Original soundtrack	Composer - Producer	Klaatu Records
Pet Semetary Two	2019	Original soundtrack	Composer - Producer	Terror Vision. Land Records
Dime	2014	Jan King	Producer - Songwriter	Citysound Music
Confessions of Lily Rogue	2010	Dhana Taprogge	Producer	Fly Me To The Moon
Notes From The Edge	2008	Notes From The Edge	Artist - Producer	Citysound Music
Dance Pop Remixes	2010	Mark Governor	Producer - Songwriter	Sonoton
Modern Rock Explosion	2006	Mark Governor	Producer - Songwriter	Sonoton
Nation of One	2004	David Rea	Producer - Arranger	Citysound Music
Offbeat Eclectic Ensembles	2003	Mark Governor	Producer - Songwriter	Sonoton
A Whore's Diary	2003	Mark Governor	Producer - Composer	Citysound Music
Pop Sensation	2000	Mark Governor	Producer - Songwriter	Sonoton
Cheaper Than Therapy	1999	Mark Governor	Producer - Songwriter	Citysound Music
Clubmix	1998	Mark Governor	Producer - Songwriter	Sonoton
The Scarlet Letter	1998	Original Soundtrack	Producer - Songwriter	Citysound Music
Alternative Rock Unplugged	1997	Mark Governor	Producer - Songwriter	Sonoton
Rap Street	1995	Mark Governor	Producer - Songwriter	Sonoton
Alternative Rock Box	1995	Mark Governor	Producer - Songwriter	Sonoton
Beach Balls	1988	Original Soundtrack	Producer - Songwriter	Metal Blade
