= Masque of the Red Death (1989 film) =

1989 film by Larry Brand

- Film poster
- Directed by: Larry Brand; Jeffrey Delman
- Screenplay by: Daryl Haney; Larry Brand
- Based on: The Masque of the Red Death; 1842 story by Edgar Allan Poe
- Produced by: Roger Corman
- Starring: Patrick Macnee; Adrian Paul
- Cinematography: Edward J. Pei
- Edited by: Stephen Mark
- Music by: Mark Governor
- Production company: Concorde Productions
- Distributed by: Concorde Productions
- Release date: October 27, 1989 (United States)
- Running time: 85 minutes
- Country: United States
- Language: English

Masque of the Red Death is a 1989 American horror film produced by Roger Corman, and directed by Larry Brand, starring Adrian Paul and Patrick Macnee. The film is a remake of the 1964 picture of the same name which was directed by Roger Corman. The screenplay, written by Daryl Haney and Larry Brand, is based upon the classic 1842 short story of the same name by American author Edgar Allan Poe, concerning the exploits of Prince Prospero, who organizes a bal masqué in his castle while the peasants of his fiefdom die from the plague in great numbers.

== Plot ==
A mysterious rider roams Prince Prospero's realm. The appearance of the rider is followed by a deadly plague that scars its victims and devastates the peasantry. The rural people are becoming desperate and seek to escape the devastation. Meanwhile, Prospero barricades himself at his palace, to avoid any villagers entering his immediate domain and disturbing him. He also organizes a masquerade ball where he invites the nobility of his land to participate. Village maidens are also brought into the castle to provide entertainment for his guests. Amongst them is Juliette, an innocent peasant girl, who continuously resists the prince's lustful pursuit. When Claudio, the prince's friend, advises Prospero to stop pursuing Juliette, the angry prince jails them in the dungeons of his palace. Meanwhile, desperate peasants try to breach the defenses of Prospero's castle to escape the Red Death. In response to their attempts to enter the safety of his castle, the prince orders boiling oil to be poured on them from high atop the battlements, scorching many of them to death. The party is in full swing when a mysterious masked man in a red cloak joins the fun unannounced.

== Cast ==
- Adrian Paul as Prince Prospero
- Clare Hoak as Juliette
- Jeff Osterhage as Claudio
- Tracy Reiner as Lucrecia
- Patrick Macnee as Machiavel
- Maria Ford as Isabella

== Reception and analysis ==
The film did not receive any substantial reviews when it was first released in 1989, but subsequently it became a more popular target of analysis in specialty publications. It received two stars from film critic Leonard Maltin, who commented that Paul's Prospero was "more thoughtful and troubled" but also that "despite an interesting approach to the figure of the Red Death and a literate (if talky) script, overall cheapness and very slow pace cripple this medieval melodrama."

Variety called it "a dubious theatrical release and an only marginal video item."

The Overlook Film Encyclopedia of Horror commended Tracy Reiner's performance in her role as Prospero's sister Lucrecia, but criticised the film: "The grandeur and elegance of Corman's earlier film are missing: in their place is plentiful dialogue about the cruelty of God and Death and the behavior of princes."

In comparison to the 1964 version, the depiction of Prospero is described as more "troubled and thoughtful" but the role of Death has been criticized as appearing more "literate" and "verbose", attributes which, according to the critics, impact adversely the plot delivery and suspense of the film.

In another critique, the film has been described as "more adept" and "less visually stylized" than the 1964 version, qualities, which according to the reviewer, hold the promise of better quality modern adaptations of Poe's works.

The script has been criticized as putting an emphasis on the love interests of the prince who is shown in an incestuous relationship with his sister Lucrecia, played by Tracy Reiner, while relentlessly pursuing innocent peasant girl Juliette, played by Clare Hoak. Adrian Paul's portrayal of prince Prospero is described as "more subtle" and "realistic", compared to the 1964 original, but the same attributes make the character dull, according to the review. The production values of the film have been described as "third rate" and the direction "haphazard". In the same review it is mentioned that "the cast is overacting shamelessly" and that the film is not faithful enough to Poe's story to justify its title.

The Orlando Sentinel critic comments that to enhance the portrayal of Death in this film version, the rest of the actors play listlessly as if they were already dead for added effect. He then pokes fun at the special effects which he does not consider very effective. He also distributes fictitious honours to the actors, based on their pronouncements in the film.

== See also ==
- Edgar Allan Poe in television and film
