= Germ Z =

- Directed by: J.T. Boone; John Craddock
- Written by: J.T. Boone
- Produced by: J.T. Boone; John Craddock
- Starring: Marguerite Sundberg; Michael Flores; Mark Chiappone; Beth Pratt
- Cinematography: Gus Sacks
- Edited by: Randy Paik
- Music by: Siddhartha Barnhoorn; Heath Hanlin
- Production companies: Germ the Movie; Two Thirds Productions
- Release date: March 12, 2013
- Running time: 84 minutes
- Country: United States
- Language: English

Germ Z, also billed as Germ, is a 2013 American horror film. It depicts the residents of a small town who become infected with a bacterium that has fallen to Earth from space. It was produced by Two Thirds Productions.

== Plot ==
The film opens with a man in a medical containment suit running through the forest. He is chased by another man who is covered in blood and screaming. The man in the hazard suit falls and hides behind a log, watching as the bloodied man clutches his head before the back of his skull explodes.

The movie then tracks back forty hours earlier, showing a woman named Brooke jogging in the woods. She is joined by local deputy Max, and the two make love in the woods. Elsewhere, a small group of military men set up a mobile missile launcher on the side of a hill. The men have been tasked with shooting down an orbiting satellite with a missile. As the missile is launched, the satellite is struck by a meteorite and explodes, with the meteorite continuing on and striking the Earth.

Brooke returns home and meets with her parents, while Max heads back to the sheriff's office. There he learns from fellow deputy Davidson that the meteorite has caused a brush fire. Davidson tells him that the military advised them to avoid the area due to possible chemical contamination, but the fire department is dispatched to dig fire breaks and contain the area. One of the firefighters discovers a piece of satellite wreckage with an odd green ooze attached to it and picks it up; later he is shown becoming ill.

That evening Brooke's friend Karen and her boyfriend Chad are spending an evening together when Karen's daughter becomes frightened by a bloodied man walking in their yard. Chad goes out to investigate and doesn't return, prompting Karen to investigate. She comes across his severely mutilated corpse in the yard, which is examined the next morning by Davidson. A preliminary autopsy performed by Davidson, who is also the town's physician, determines that Chad was killed and eaten by more than one human. He also discovers that Chad's hypothalamus is growing at an exponential rate despite his being dead. Davidson then discovers a bacterium in the corpse he has never seen before, prompting him to speculate that the bacterium is the result of interplanetary contamination.

Brooke rides her bike home from town and discovers a horde of bloodied strangers attacking her family. The attackers act like zombies, chasing down and feeding on anyone they encounter. The infected kill Brooke's mom and brother before she manages to escape. Her father also makes it out, deciding to jog into town. Max encounters the infected at a campsite and is forced to abandon his patrol car and walk back to the sheriff's office. He meets up with a battered Davidson, who is attacked and bitten. During the melee, Davidson bites Max on his leg and apparently infects him as well. Brooke stumbles across the military man in the hazard suit shown in the beginning and together they make it back to the armored vehicles. Brooke uses a satellite phone to alert the military to the danger before being forced to flee alone.

An infected Max drives another police cruiser out of town and crashes it on the side of the road. He climbs into the back, trapping himself in the car. Brooke finds the cruiser and gets inside, where Max confesses his love for her and shows her an engagement ring he bought for her. The infected surround the cruiser and attempt to get in. When they break the windows to the back, Brooke and Max decide to try and fight their way out. The movie ends as the two rush out of the cruiser shooting, leaving the viewer to speculate as to their fate.

== Cast ==
- Marguerite Sundberg as Brooke (billed as Marguerite Mitchell)
- Michael Flores as Deputy Max
- Mark Chiappone as Stu, Brooke's father
- Beth Pratt as Karen, Brooke's friend
- Zoe Miller as Steph, Brooke's sister
- Bernard Setaro Clark as Davidson, town physician and part-time sheriff's deputy
- Jody Pucello as Cooper, leader of the military men
- Brendan Nagle as Chad, Karen's boyfriend
- Lynette Dixon Boone -Mrs Brewer

== Release ==
Fangoria announced it as part of their Fangoria Presents series of VOD and DVD releases in April 2013. It was released on DVD on May 17, 2013.

Additional production information is available in a handful of "making of" videos released by Fangoria as part of its release of the film. The first one is "Getting the Bug Part One"; it and the others are located on Fangoria's website, Fangoria.com.

== Reception ==
Reel Advice wrote "there's no denying that what will be presented here is easily one of the most bombastic, exciting, and often scary zombie films that has been put up in some time. That's extraordinary for a zombie movie, and frankly, it's a little out of the ordinary for most any movie of any type in some time. If you're looking for a zombie movie that's every bit a match for Romero at his best, then "Germ Z" is going to be a great place to look."

The Other View wrote: "Though I have a few qualms with GermZ, overall I was pretty impressed with the film. The story is dark, gorey, well paced, with lots of action. Though the action kicks in at the jump, it takes a little time for the full story to settle in and once it does, it does an excellent job of holding your attention with a nice balance of story with savage eatery. From a guy who's not a fan of these types of films, I'd have to say GermZ was a pretty decent experience".

Horror Society rated it 5.2/10 and wrote, "The gore factor is pretty high, and we all love lots and lots of violence. The suspense level is high as well, as is the performances from all the actors. The production value is a little low for a larger budgeted indie film. And believe it or not, Germ Z does have some funny points and one or two spine chilling moments." It also notes that "There is absolutely nothing new brought to the zombie cinema world here."

Lea Lawrynowicz of HorrorNews.Net called it "a really obvious, run of the mill, typical zombie flick". She also noted that “Germ Z”, ain’t all bad. Production values are good, even if it's clear the budget is a bit too slim to pull off reasonable looking military headquarters at the beginning, and the meteor crash leaves a bit to be desired. There are a few definite weak spots in the cast, but the acting is surprisingly good. The deputy especially is played by a compelling actor who raises the films credibility level...While it kinda pissed me off, it also managed to hold my interest, with the action sequences providing good, solid entertainment."

== Sequel ==
Director J.T. Boone has expressed interest in making a sequel, saying that he wants to "satisfy his own curiosity about what happens next."
