= Marta Martin =

American television and film actress (born 1966)

- Born: September 10, 1966 (age 59); Medina, Ohio, U.S.
- Occupation: Actress
- Years active: 1990–present
- Spouse: Shawn Amos (m. 1999)

Marta Alicia Martin (born September 10, 1966) is an American television and film actress.

== Personal life ==
Martin was born in Medina, Ohio. She is of partial Mexican heritage on her mother's side. She is one of four children. She relocated to California at the age of 19.

== Work ==
In 1987, Martin came to Los Angeles on a Greyhound bus with $500. After a series of odd jobs, she landed her first film role (performing under the name "Marta Alicia") in the film Mindwarp co-starring Bruce Campbell. Her roommate during her first years in Los Angeles was soap opera and CSI: Miami star Eva LaRue. They remain best friends to this day.

Martin spent much of the 1990s guest-starring in a variety of network sitcoms and dramas, including NYPD Blue, Dharma & Greg, Players, and Ned & Stacey. She was part of the original cast of the ABC drama Brothers & Sisters, before the cast was overhauled prior to premiering.

She would continue television work in the 2007 Lifetime movie Christmas in Paradise co-starring Eureka star Colin Ferguson. She co-starred in the 2009 film release Skills Like This which won the Audience Award at the 2007 SXSW Film Festival.

== Filmography ==
- Star Trek (2009)
- Christmas in Paradise (2007)
- Shark (1 episode, 2007)
- Skills Like This (2007)
- Eyes (1 episode, 2007)
- Brothers & Sisters (1 episode, unaired pilot 2007)
- CSI: Miami (1 episode, 2004)
- CSI: NY (1 episode, 2004)
- Without a Trace (1 episode, 2003)
- CSI: Crime Scene Investigation (1 episode, 2002)
- City of Angels (1 episode, 2000)
- Any Day Now (1 episode, 1999)
- NYPD Blue (2 episodes, 1994–1999)
- Dharma & Greg (1 episode, 1998)
- Team Knight Rider (2 episodes, 1998)
- Players (2 episodes, 1997)
- Diagnosis Murder (1 episode, 1997)
- Silk Stalkings (1 episode, 1996)
- JAG (1 episode, 1995)
- Ned & Stacey (2 episodes, 1995)
- Body Chemistry 4: Full Exposure (1995)
- Murder, She Wrote (1 episode, 1995)
- Danger Theatre (1 episode, 1993)
- Mindwarp (1992)
- Monday Morning (1990)
