= Tony Timpone =

American journalist

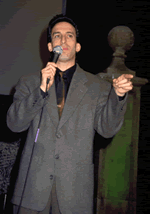
Former Fangoria editor Tony Timpone, emceeing a Weekend of Horrors convention

Tony Timpone is the former longtime editor of Fangoria magazine, as well as an author about the horror genre, a film festival programmer, and a producer/interviewer for horror-related TV and radio shows.

== Early life ==
Tony Timpone was born in New York City, raised in Queens, and graduated from New York University in 1985. He wrote for the university's two student newspapers, The Courier and Washington Square News, and majored in journalism. As a child, he had read the influential Famous Monsters of Filmland magazine, and said he "always wanted to write for a magazine like that."

In high school, he had been president of a science-fiction club. He attended science-fiction conventions, where he would interview genre stars. Selling his freelance interviews, he launched his journalism career. He wanted to write for Fangoria, but it was not accepting freelance articles at the time:

However, they had a sister publication which was a monthly science fiction magazine, called Starlog. While I was still a student at NYU, I was able to sell a few articles to Starlog, such as interviews with actors in the Star Trek films. I'd meet these actors at conventions, or if I found out they were going to be performing in a Broadway show, I would write to them and arrange interviews while they were in town. I also sold articles to other niche magazines, like Monsterland and Enterprise Incidents. But Fangoria was the magazine I really wanted to work for.

== Career ==
=== Fangoria ===
Tony Timpone began working with Fangoria magazine in 1985 and continued there until February 2010, when he was succeeded by Chris Alexander. He said of getting the job, starting under editor David McDonnell, that:

I first joined the Fangoria staff in July of 1985. It was my first job out of college, although I had been freelancing to Fango's sister publication Starlog during my last year at college. I began as an Editorial Assistant to then-Editor David Everitt, who decided to move on a month after I started. Since I was fresh out of college and this was my first job in publishing, I was a little too green to take over the job myself. So I served as the Managing Editor to Dave McDonnell, who took over as Editor until I got my wings. The following year, I was promoted to Editor in Chief.

In the early 1990s, Timpone was a consultant on three Fangoria movies for Columbia TriStar Home Video: Mindwarp (1991), Children of the Night (1991), and Severed Ties (1992). In the early to mid-2000s, he served as an acquisitions chief for Fangoria 's various video labels. In addition, he was a producer/interviewer for Fangoria TV’s Screamography, a recurring guest on the since-defunct Sirius Satellite Radio show Fangoria Radio with host Dee Snider and co-host Debbie Rochon, for four years beginning in 2006, and the co-producer/programming producer/moderator of Fangoria's Weekend of Horrors conventions from 1986 to 2009, and again beginning 2021

After leaving his editor-in-chief position in 2010, Timpone began running Fangoria's video-on-demand and DVD divisions.

Timpone also edited Fangoria's sister publication Gorezone, which lasted from 1989 to 1993.

=== Other work ===
Since 1993, Timpone has helped program international horror/fantasy festivals in Milan, Italy and Montreal, Quebec, Canada. Before its closing, Timpone programmed and hosted The Two Boots Pioneer Theater's monthly "Monster Mondays" film series.

Under the name Anthony Timpone, he authored the 1996 St. Martin's Press book Men, Makeup, and Monsters: Hollywood's Masters of Illusion and FX.

In late 2004, he served as a producer on Bravo’s five-hour documentary series The 100 Scariest Movie Moments: "Kaufman Films needed a 'horror guy' to get them connected with the folks in the horror industry. So I came on board and tracked down and interviewed most of the scream greats for the series."

He was programming director and moderator for the horror conventions Monsterpalooza and Son of Monsterpalooza in at least 2016 and 2017. Since 1998, he has been the co-director of international programming for Montreal, Canada's Fantasia Film Festival.

== Filmography ==
Year	Title	Role	Notes
2001	Satan's Menagerie	The Ghoul	TV-movie
2003	House of the Dead	Zombie	Uncredited
2007	Brutal Massacre: A Comedy	Himself	
2007	Dying for Change	Himself	
2008	Angel's Blade: The Ascension	Tony	
2009	His Name Was Jason	Himself	
2009	The Psycho Legacy	Himself	In Production
2009	Horrorween	Himself	
2011	Still Screaming: The Ultimate Scary Movie Retrospective	Himself	Documentary film
2020	Jay Sebring....Cutting to the Truth	Himself	
