= Professor Griffin's Midnight Shadow Show =

American public-access horror television program

Opening title card

Professor Griffin's Midnight Shadow Show was an American horror-host television program created and hosted by Joseph Fotinos as Professor Anton Griffin. The weekly series ran on Austin public-access television from 2000 to 2006.

== Format and cast ==
Each broadcast paired a full-length horror film with brief comic blackout sketches. Professor Griffin appeared in the sketches with Usher and Dan-Dan, usually before and after a public-domain film such as Night of the Living Dead. The show aired Fridays at midnight on Time Warner Cable Access Channel 16 and was repeated Sundays at 11 p.m. on Channel 15.

The on-air cast included:

- Joseph Fotinos as Professor Anton Griffin
- Kim Shafer as Usher
- Gilbert Austin as Dan-Dan
- Forrest J Ackerman as Professor Bruno Lampini

== History ==
Before creating Professor Griffin, Joseph Fotinos performed under the name Joseph Anthony, as a member of the Austin alternative comedy troupe Monks' Night Out. He grew up in Houston watching Harold Gunn's Boo Theater. His interests in acting and horror films came together in the Professor Griffin character. Before the weekly series, Griffin served as Goodwill Industries' official Halloween Costume Spokesperson and hosted Halloween movie specials on KVC 13 and Fox 7.

In 2001, Fotinos developed a year-round horror program with producer Shane Scott. Franklin/Nasty Cat Productions produced the show. It aired in both Austin and Houston. The show was noted for strong production values for a cable-access television show.

Scott produced and directed the series. In 2004, while the proposed Scream Channel and Horror Channel were recruiting horror hosts, he and Fotinos looked for a national outlet. They would continue making the program if neither network chose it, Scott said. Professor Griffin also appeared in short movie-hosting segments on Austin's Fox and CW affiliates and returned for annual Halloween broadcasts during the show's run.

Professor Griffin ran a trivia contest at Camp Hacknslash in August 2003, for the Alamo Drafthouse and Ain't It Cool News preview of Freddy vs. Jason.

Griffin emceed for three nights of insect-themed horror films at the Bullock Texas State History Museum. The programs added trivia contests and live theatrical effects to the screenings.

Other Austin appearances ranged from a presentation of The Raven for Ain't It Cool News and the Alamo Drafthouse's Saturday Morning Film Club to the local premiere of Van Helsing. The premiere brought promotional work involving Universal Pictures horror releases.

PublishAmerica issued Fotinos's book The Midnight Shadow Show: Prof. Griffin in 2005. Its 273 pages contained essays, poems, short pieces and film reviews about horror entertainment, written both by Fotinos and through his Professor Griffin persona.

== National and later appearances ==
Professor Griffin later became the horror host for Fangoria TV. In January 2008, he appeared at Fangoria's first Weekend of Horrors convention in Austin. Fotinos hosted horror trivia and moderated discussions with Donnie Dunagan, Gary Kent, and members of the cast and crew of Friday the 13th Part VII: The New Blood.

Fotinos was inducted into the Horror Host Hall of Fame for his portrayal of Professor Griffin at a ceremony held in Cincinnati on March 16, 2019.

Professor Griffin returned to television on October 31, 2020, in the half-hour Halloween special Professor Griffin's Midnight Theatre. Fotinos again played Griffin, with Kim Standley as Usher and James Fotinos as Dan-Dan. J. Budro Partida produced and directed the special at Griffin Manor in Austin. Using George A. Romero's Night of the Living Dead as inspiration, it combined film clips, production history, trivia and comedy.
