= Children of the Night (1991 film) =

1991 film by Tony Randel

- Directed by: Tony Randel
- Written by: Nicolas Falacci; William Hopkins; Tony Randel; Christopher Webster
- Produced by: Norman Jacobs; Steven Jacobs; Howard Nash; Damon Santostefano; Christopher Webster
- Starring: Karen Black; Ami Dolenz; Peter DeLuise; Garrett Morris
- Cinematography: Richard Michalak
- Edited by: Rick Roberts
- Music by: Daniel Licht
- Production company: Fangoria Films
- Distributed by: Columbia Pictures
- Release date: 1991 (Toronto)
- Running time: 92 minutes
- Country: United States
- Language: English

Children of the Night is a 1991 American horror film directed by Tony Randel, and starring Karen Black, Peter DeLuise, and Ami Dolenz. Its plot follows a young woman and a local schoolteacher who attempt to rid their small community of vampires that have been inadvertently unleashed.

== Plot ==
Before going away to college, two childhood friends, Cindy Thompson and Lucy Barrett, decide to symbolically cleanse themselves of the "dirt" of their small town by swimming laps in a flooded, abandoned church crypt. Lucy drops her crucifix, which drifts down onto the submerged remains of an ancient vampire, Czakyr. Czakyr awakes and kills Cindy.

Mark Gardner (Peter DeLuise), a schoolteacher from a nearby town, is directed to Allburg by an old friend of his, Father Frank Aldin (Evan Mackenzie). Mark tries to help Lucy, as she has now become the target of a town-turned-vampires, due to her "virgin blood". Lucy, Mark, and a drunken preacher make camp in an abandoned building outside of town and make plans to fight the vampire army. Using the preacher's "crossmobile" they battle Allburg's vampire populace, ultimately taking on the evil Czakyr. Once Czakyr has been killed, the townsfolk return to normal, with some complaining of "splinters in their chests".

== Cast ==
- Karen Black as Karen Thompson
- Evan MacKenzie as Father Frank Aldin
- Peter DeLuise as Mark Gardner
- Ami Dolenz as Lucy Barrett
- Maya McLaughlin as Cindy Thompson
- David Sawyer as Czakyr
- Garrett Morris as Matty
- Shirley Spiegler Jacobs as Grandma
- Josette DiCarlo as Officer Gates
- Lloyd J. Kalicki as Billy

== Production ==
Filming took place in Calumet, Michigan, as well as Windsor Lake Studios in Eagle River, Wisconsin.

== Release ==
Children of the Night had its world premiere at the 1991 Toronto International Film Festival as part of their Midnight Madness program.

== Reception ==
Jay Scott of The Globe and Mail referred to the film as a standout of the Toronto International Film Festival, referring to the film as "a truly disgusting vampire film - imagine Karen Black in latex makeup, moaning through her rubber fangs". Yasmina Ketita reviewed the film in 2026 for Rue Morgue, recommending it and stating "Embodying a childish campiness, CHILDREN OF THE NIGHT feels like an R-rated episode of Are You Afraid of the Dark?."

== Bibliography ==
- Jackson, Anna, Karen Coats, and Roderick McGillis. The Gothic in Children's Literature: Haunting the Borders. New York: Routledge. 2008. Print.
- Kendrick, Charmette. "Horror in Children's Literature from the Nineteenth Century." The Goblins Will Get You! Volume 1. 2009:19-23.Academic Search Complete. Web. 15 February 2011.
- Wilkens, Katharina. "Mary and the Demons: Marian Devotion and Ritual Healing in Tanzania." Journal of Religion in Africa 39.2009: 295–318.Religion and Philosophy Collection.Web. 15 February 2011.
- "Review-Children of the Night." Fearscene. XOOPS, 6/15/2005. Web. 15 February 2011.
