= Kerry O'Quinn =

- Born: Austin, Texas
- Occupations: Writer, publisher

Kerry O'Quinn is an American writer, magazine publisher, director and producer, most noted for the creation of Starlog, Fangoria, Cinemagic, Future Life, Rock Video, Hard Rock and Comics Scene magazines.

== Career ==
O'Quinn was a publisher for Future Life magazine during the 1980s.

O'Quinn produced the Star Trek 20th Anniversary Convention, the Star Wars 10th Anniversary Convention, and the Starlog 20th Anniversary Convention.

In 2009, an award was named after him, the O'Quinn Award, which recognizes "exceptional achievement in the art and craft of the horror film field." O'Quinn himself was the first recipient of the award.

His film "Queerantine!" (2009) Screened at the Big Bear Horror Film Festival (later Big Bear Horro-Fi Film Festival) in 2009.

== Personal life ==
O'Quinn currently lives in Los Angeles, California. In his early years in New York he was friends with the novelist Ayn Rand, along with numerous individuals from Rand's circle, including Nathaniel Branden and Barbara Branden.
