= Creation Entertainment =

American entertainment company

- Type: Private
- Industry: Entertainment
- Founded: 1971
- Founder: Gary Berman and Adam Malin
- Headquarters: Glendale, California, U.S.
- Area served: U.S.
- Services: Fan conventions
- Website: creationent.com

Creation Entertainment is an American for-profit entertainment company located in Glendale, California, which produces fan conventions for fans of various films and television series, mainly in the science fiction, horror, and fantasy genres. Creation Entertainment hosts about 20 conventions annually in various locations such as Chicago, Illinois; and Burbank, California. Creation was founded in 1971 by comic book fans Gary Berman and Adam Malin in New York City. Since then, it has organized over 2,300 conventions.

Creation hosts the largest Star Trek convention in the world, which occurs annually during the summer in Las Vegas, Nevada; they previously produced Fangoria's Weekend of Horrors conventions. The company has the "official" convention rights for such properties as Twilight, Stargate SG-1, and Xena: Warrior Princess. The company is also a licensee of merchandise for many genre television series, including The X-Files, Xena, Stargate SG-1, Stargate Atlantis, Lost and Supernatural, producing souvenir items such as T-shirts, hats, mugs, autographed items and calendars.

== Events and guests ==
Creation conventions consist of on-stage celebrity appearances, Q&A sessions, parties and cabaret performances featuring celebrities and charity auction breakfasts. Attendees may also purchase autographs and photo ops that allow fans to be photographed with celebrities.

Creation collects additional money at their shows through limited-attendance functions not included in the ticket prices, including celebrity food functions, photo opportunities, and slower-paced autographing sessions.

Over the years, hundreds of actors, directors, producers and writers have appeared at Creation Entertainment conventions to speak to and meet their fans.

Comics guests who have appeared at Creation Conventions over the years include Stan Lee, Vaughn Bodé, Ralph Bakshi, Jenette Kahn, Michael Kaluta, Jeff Jones, Gil Kane, Steve Gerber, Nicola Cuti, Bob Smith, Alex Niño, Martin Pasko, Marv Wolfman, Jim Steranko, Howard Chaykin, Joe Staton, Jerry Iger, Len Wein, George Pérez, Frank Miller, John Byrne, Herb Trimpe, Gray Morrow, Bob Larkin, John Romita, Sr., John Romita, Jr., Gene Colan, Archie Goodwin, Rudy Nebres, Tom Yeates, Bob Wiacek, Terry Austin, Jim Shooter, and Chris Claremont.

Media guests who have appeared at Creation Conventions over the years include Tom Savini, Robin Curtis, Frank Ashmore, Terrance Dicks, Lucy Lawless, Arnold Schwarzenegger, George Lucas, Ron Howard, James Cameron, Vincent Price, Tim Conway, Carl Reiner, William Shatner, Leonard Nimoy, DeForest Kelley, Walter Koenig, James Doohan, Harlan Ellison, Isaac Asimov, David Prowse, Joe Dante, Nicholas Meyer, Patrick Stewart, William Gaines, Peter Jackson, Scott Bakula, Gillian Anderson, Chris Carter, Rob Zombie, Avery Brooks and Kate Mulgrew.

== History ==
=== New York comic cons ===
The first Creation comic book convention was held on November 26–28, 1971, at the New Yorker Hotel, New York City, produced by 14-year-old Queens schoolboys Adam Malin and Gary Berman. The official guest was star comics creator Jim Steranko.

Creation Con II took place at the Statler Hilton Hotel in New York City on November 24–26, 1972. The guests of honor were Philip José Farmer and Frank Kelly Freas. Other guests included Vaughn Bodé, Jim Steranko, Gray Morrow, Michael Kaluta, Neal Adams, Howard Chaykin, John Severin, Frank Brunner, Isaac Asimov, Ron Goulart, Roy Krenkel, and Hans Stefan Santesson.

From that point, Creation Entertainment continued producing large annual conventions in New York City (under such colorful names as "Big Comicon Creation Convention," "Creation Comic Book & Pop Culture Convention," and "Creation '78"), usually taking place over the weekend following Thanksgiving. A popular venue for the Thanksgiving cons was the Statler Hilton Hotel. In the mid-1970s, attendance at the New York Creation conventions averaged around 5,000 fans; the admission was around $5/day.

=== Expansion ===
Beginning around 1980, Creation expanded their conventions beyond New York, producing cons in San Francisco and Washington, D.C. In 1983, Creation produced conventions in St. Louis, Washington, D.C., Pittsburgh, Anaheim, New York City, and Houston.

By 1983, Creation Entertainment was the leading producer of comic book conventions nationwide. According to long-time comics editor Diana Schutz, "Creation, at that time, used to run a comic book show virtually every weekend in some part of the country. It was then [c. 1983] that I met my future . . . husband, Bob Schreck, who was working for Creation in those days."

=== Branching out ===
In 1984, Creation branched out from the comics world into the horror and science fiction genres. They teamed up with Fangoria to produce annual horror movie conventions in Los Angeles, New Jersey, and Chicago known as the Weekend of Horrors.

From 1984–1986, Creation produced regular conventions dedicated to Doctor Who and other science fiction shows and movies. Frequent guests of the Creation Entertainment Doctor Who conventions included Patrick Troughton, Nicholas Courtney, Mark Strickson, Matthew Waterhouse, Mary Tamm, Elisabeth Sladen, and Terrance Dicks.

1984 Doctor Who-focused conventions:

- Philadelphia (February 11–12, June 9–10, and Nov. 3–4)
- Rochester (May 26–28)
- San Francisco (June 2–3 and Oct. 6–7)
- Washington, D.C., (June 16–17)
- Boston (June 22–23, July 14–15, and Oct. 6–7)
- Detroit (June 30–July 1)
- Denver (July 7–8)
- Chicago (July 21–22 and Sept. 29–30)
- New Orleans (Sept. 22–23)
- Atlanta (Oct. 13–14)
- St. Louis (Oct. 20–21)

1985 Doctor Who-focused conventions:

- Boston (Jan. 12–13 and Aug. 24–25)
- San Francisco (Jan. 26–27, June 8–9, and Oct. 26–27)
- Philadelphia (Feb. 9–10, August 10–11, and November 9–10)
- New York City (March 16–17 and July 27–28)
- Rochester (March 23–24)
- Chicago (April 27–28 and Sept. 7–8)
- Los Angeles (May 25–27)
- Tampa (June 29–30)

1986 Doctor Who-focused conventions:

- Chicago (Jan. 11–12)
- Washington (Jan. 18–19)
- Boston (Jan. 25–26 and July 12–13),
- San Francisco (Feb. 1–2)
- New York City (February 22–23 and May 10–11)
- Oakland (March 8–9), Orlando (March 22–23)
- Trenton (March 23)

The comics-focused Creation '84 was held November 23–25, 1984, at the Omni Park Central Hotel, New York City. November 30–December 1, 1985, were the dates of the 15th annual Creation Comic Book Convention, held at the Roosevelt Hotel in New York City. Guests include Jim Shooter, Chris Claremont, Robin Curtis, Frank Ashmore, and Terrance Dicks.

In 1986 Creation produced large-scale comics conventions in at least six cities, including Philadelphia (July 19–20), Los Angeles (August 9–10), New York City (August 23–24), San Francisco (also August 23-24), Washington, D.C. (September 6–7), and New Brunswick, New Jersey (September 20–21). The New York show featured a special tribute to Marvel Comics' 25th anniversary; guests included Stan Lee and Jim Shooter.

Creation Convention '87 was held June 27–28 at New York's Roosevelt Hotel. 1988 saw two New York Creations Cons, on June 25–26 and November 25–27, both held at the Penta Hotel. These were the last Creation comic conventions held in New York City; after 1988, Creation shifted focus from comics conventions to horror and science fiction shows (although they hosted one last Creation Comic Book & Pop Culture Convention in Pasadena, California, on January 31–February 2, 2003).

=== "Official" science fiction cons ===
In 1991, Creation Entertainment received its first license from Paramount Pictures for the Star Trek property, becoming the first studio licensee for photographic still reproduction.

In 2001, Creation hosted the first annual Star Trek convention in Las Vegas, Nevada.

A Star Trek "Grand Slam" event was held in Pasadena in March 2004.

Creation Entertainment's Stargate SG-1 conventions were marketed as "The Official Stargate SG-1 and Stargate Atlantis Tour", which mostly took place in the United States until the company acquired the SG-1 license for Vancouver, British Columbia, conventions in 2005. A Creation Stargate Convention took place in Los Angeles on November 16, 2006.

Creation teamed up with TheOneRing.net to present The One Ring Celebration (ORC) in 2005, 2006, and 2007.

In 2008, Creation added Austin, Texas, to the Weekend of Horrors circuit; but in 2009 Fangoria broke ties with Creation.

=== 2013 Guinness World Record ===
In 2013, the 12th Annual Official Star Trek Convention, held in the United States (in Las Vegas, Nevada), broke the previous Guinness World Record for the largest gathering of people dressed as Star Trek characters, having counted 1,085 people.

== Criticism ==
Creation Entertainment has been criticized in the past by fans for reasons including rude customer service, rushed autograph lines, and little to no personal time with celebrity guests allowed both during and outside of the scheduled events.
