= I, Zombie =

- Directed by: Andrew Parkinson
- Written by: Andrew Parkinson
- Produced by: Andrew Parkinson
- Starring: Giles Aspen; Ellen Softley
- Cinematography: Rob Miller; Andrew Parkinson
- Edited by: Gary Hewson; Andrew Parkinson
- Music by: Andrew Parkinson
- Distributed by: Fangoria Films; The Asylum
- Release date: 1998
- Running time: 79 minutes
- Country: United Kingdom
- Language: English

I, Zombie: The Chronicles of Pain is a film which was released by Fangoria Films in 1998; it was written, directed, produced and scored by Andrew Parkinson. It tells the story of a young man who gets infected by being bitten by a zombie and gradually starts turning into one himself.

== Plot ==
The film opens in mockumentary style with a woman, Sarah, talking about her boyfriend Mark in the past tense.

Mark skips Sarah's event for his research field trip, and she is very displeased with his decision. Mark travels out to the woods to collect moss samples when he stumbles across a rusty decaying station wagon. Intrigued, he continues down the path and eventually finds an abandoned farmhouse. He enters the house, explores the rooms, and stumbles across an injured man propped up against a wall. When he hears a woman scream, he rushes to her aid and finds her having a seizure on a dirty mattress. He brushes her hair out of her face to comfort her and sees that she has the same sort of scars and deformities that the man had. He picks her up and carries her outside, and she bites his neck. He promptly drops her and runs away, eventually collapsing in a nearby field.

Back at home, Sarah calls an investigator to report Mark missing for three weeks. Mark wakes up, thinks to himself about how he doesn't know how long he's been unconscious, and admits to killing his first victim, a camper in the woods. He recalls how he had no control of the situation. He decides he has to hide and rents a new apartment. He looks at his bite wound in a mirror and notices it is beginning to look worse. He collapses, suffers a minor seizure, and reports it in his digital log, along with how he has not eaten in six days and has to find another victim.

As his condition worsens, he begins to accept and study it, keeping everything recorded in logbooks or his digital recorder. He still appears normal and continues to live and function in society, although his bite wound will not heal and the surrounding tissue is starting to decay. He picks up a hitchhiker, knocks him out with chloroform, and eats most of the man's chest. He then burns the man's body and possessions.

Meanwhile, Sarah begins seeing another man named David. Late one night after a date, someone rings her doorbell, but she sees no one. Mark attacks her with chloroform and brings her back inside her apartment to look at her one last time. Mark continues on his hunting spree as his appearance slowly becomes more ghastly and his behavior more erratic. He begins losing a lot of weight and becomes weaker. His leg breaks during the disposal of a victim's body, and he is forced to attach a metal rod to support his ankle. Mark also begins to lose his grip on reality and has hallucinations. His decomposition becomes so severe that he can no longer bear to look at himself, so he overdoses with a bottle of chloroform.

== Cast ==
- Giles Aspen as Mark
- Ellen Softley as Sarah

== Production ==
The film took four years to make. It was shot and edited in 18 months, but it took another 18 months after director Andrew Parkinson realized that there were problems with the script's structure. The unplanned re-shoots caused strained relationships, but the film was completed. Post production took another six months. Parkinson likes the grain, texture, and colors of 16 mm film, and wanted to use that in his film. Broke at the time that he made I, Zombie, Parkinson was unable to pay even traveling expenses. He did not use auditions, as he had either worked with the actors previously or had seen them in local theater. Giles Aspen performed his own stunts.

== Release ==
Fangoria Films released I, Zombie in 1998. It was released on VHS in 1999.

Jinga Films released I, Zombie on DVD in North American on 18 February 2014.

== Reception ==
Keith Phipps of The A.V. Club wrote that the film is too dull to appeal even to Fangoria subscribers. Writing in Zombie Movies: The Ultimate Guide, Glenn Kay called the film overly serious and predictable. Peter Dendle, author of The Zombie Movie Encyclopedia, described it as "more competent and compelling than most of its small-scale Yankee predecessors."

Marc Price, the director of Colin, said that if he had known about the existence of I, Zombie, he probably wouldn't have made his film.

=== Awards ===
- Commendation Award for Best Independent Feature, Festival of Fantastic Films (1998)
