= Queer as Folk season 4 =

Queer as Folk
- Season 4
- DVD cover
- No. of episodes: 14

Release
- Original network: Showtime; Showcase
- Original release: April 18 – July 18, 2004

Season chronology
- ← Previous; Season 3 Next → Season 5

The fourth season of Queer as Folk, an American and Canadian television series, consisted of fourteen episodes and premiered on Showtime on April 18, 2004, in the United States and on Showcase on April 19, 2004, in Canada.

== Cast ==
=== Main cast ===
- Gale Harold as Brian Kinney
- Randy Harrison as Justin Taylor
- Hal Sparks as Michael Novotny
- Peter Paige as Emmett Honeycutt
- Scott Lowell as Ted Schmidt
- Thea Gill as Lindsay Peterson
- Michelle Clunie as Melanie Marcus
- Robert Gant as Ben Bruckner
- Sharon Gless as Debbie Novotny
- Jack Wetherall as Vic Grassi

=== Supporting cast ===
- Harris Allan as James "Hunter" Montgomery
- Sherry Miller as Jennifer Taylor
- Matt Battaglia as Drew Boyd
- Makyla Smith as Daphne Chanders
- Peter MacNeill as Carl Horvath
- Carlo Rota as Gardner Vance
- Robin Thomas as Sam Auerbach
- Mitch Morris as Cody Bell
- Meredith Henderson as Callie Leeson
- Mike Shara as Brett Keller
- Dean Armstrong as Blake Wyzecki
- Stephanie Moore as Cynthia

== Episodes ==
No. overall	No. in season	Directed by	Written by	Original release date	Prod. code
57	1	Kelly Makin	Ron Cowen & Daniel Lipman	April 18, 2004 (United States); April 19, 2004 (Canada)	401
Brian is deep in debt and faces giving up the lifestyle to which he's grown accustomed. Michael and Hunter return to Pittsburgh to face the custody hearing. Emmett visits Ted in rehab.
58	2	Jeremy Podeswa	Ron Cowen, Daniel Lipman & Michael MacLennan	April 25, 2004 (United States); April 26, 2004 (Canada)	402
Brian decides to start his own ad agency. Ted struggles to re-enter life after rehab. Emmett and Michael discover their inner Faerie. Justin encourages a friend to fight back against his bashers.
59	3	Chris Grismer	Ron Cowen, Daniel Lipman & Brad Fraser	May 2, 2004 (United States); May 3, 2004 (Canada)	403
Brian warns Justin about his involvement with Cody and the Pink Posse. Ted continues to push his friends away as he begins a new job. Vic and Rodney decide to move in together.
60	4	Kevin Inch	Ron Cowen, Daniel Lipman & Del Shores	May 9, 2004 (United States); May 10, 2004 (Canada)	404
Brian turns to Ted for help with his new agency. Justin and Cody take the Pink Posse to a violent level. Melanie struggles to separate personal feelings from her professional responsibility as a lawyer when a case is taken away from her. The social worker's visit to Michael and Ben's doesn't quite go as planned.
61	5	Kelly Makin	Ron Cowen, Daniel Lipman & Shawn Postoff	May 16, 2004 (United States); May 17, 2004 (Canada)	405
Ted accepts Brian's offer of a job at Kinnetik. Cody takes Justin to the firing range. Melanie lends her support to the custody case after Ted helps her see what's important. Each now living alone, Emmett and Debbie find comfort in each other's company.
62	6	Bruce McDonald	Ron Cowen, Daniel Lipman & Michael MacLennan	May 23, 2004 (United States); May 24, 2004 (Canada)	406
Michael and Justin receive an offer to turn 'Rage' into a live-action feature film. Ted delivers his letter of amends to Emmett. Debbie and Vic get into a heated argument that will change their lives. Brian receives shocking news.
63	7	Alex Chapple	Ron Cowen, Daniel Lipman & Brad Fraser	May 30, 2004 (United States); May 31, 2004 (Canada)	407
Brian is diagnosed with testicular cancer. Ted falls back into old habits. Debbie tries to make up for the awful things she said to Vic before his death.
64	8	Bruce McDonald	Ron Cowen, Daniel Lipman & Del Shores	June 6, 2004 (United States); June 7, 2004 (Canada)	408
Justin discovers Brian didn't go to Ibiza. Michael and Justin meet with a Hollywood producer about 'Rage.' Debbie has a heart-to-heart with Horvath.
65	9	Kevin Inch	Ron Cowen, Daniel Lipman & Shawn Postoff	June 13, 2004 (United States); June 14, 2004 (Canada)	409
Justin discovers why Brian has thrown him out. Can Michael and Ben's relationship survive Michael's Hollywood windfall and Ben's manuscript rejection? A pro football player makes a play for Emmett.
66	10	John Fawcett	Ron Cowen, Daniel Lipman & Michael MacLennan	June 20, 2004 (United States); June 21, 2004 (Canada)	410
Brian deals with the effects of his surgery. A former student of Ben's causes a rift between Ben and Michael until Ben discovers why he was being showered with attention. Emmett secretly helps Ted find an athlete to model Brown Athletics' new underwear line. Lindsay struggles with her attraction to Sam.
67	11	Thom Best	Ron Cowen, Daniel Lipman & Del Shores	June 27, 2004 (United States); June 28, 2004 (Canada)	411
Brian goes head-to-head with the fundraiser hired by the Center. Hunter leads Ben and Michael to believe he might be hustling again. Debbie tries to woo Carl back. Sam isn't ready to give up on Lindsay. Emmett and Drew continue their affair.
68	12	Kelly Makin	Ron Cowen, Daniel Lipman & Brad Fraser	July 4, 2004 (United States); July 5, 2004 (Canada)	412
Brian decides to participate in the Liberty Ride. Drew asks Emmett back. Hunter reveals to Callie that he's HIV positive. Melanie and Lindsay discuss the future.
69	13	Michael DeCarlo	Ron Cowen, Daniel Lipman & Shawn Postoff	July 11, 2004 (United States); July 12, 2004 (Canada)	413
When Emmett discovers Ted has decided not to participate in the Liberty Ride because he has no support system, Emmett signs up. Justin is invited to Hollywood to help pitch Rage to the studios. Lindsay goes to Brian for advice about Mel. The Liberty Ride leaves for Toronto.
70	14	Kelly Makin	Ron Cowen & Daniel Lipman	July 18, 2004 (United States); July 19, 2004 (Canada)	414
Michael and Ben have trouble crossing into the United States as a married couple. Ted and Emmett get lost in the woods on the way to a 12-step meeting, while Brian takes a nasty fall and breaks his collarbone. Melanie goes into labor. 'Rage' is given the green light.
