= Queer as Folk season 3 =

Queer as Folk
- Season 3
- DVD cover
- No. of episodes: 14

Release
- Original network: Showtime; Showcase
- Original release: March 2 – June 22, 2003

Season chronology
- ← Previous; Season 2 Next → Season 4

The third season of Queer as Folk, an American and Canadian television series, consisted of fourteen episodes and premiered on Showtime on March 2, 2003, in the United States and on Showcase on April 7, 2003, in Canada.

== Cast ==
=== Main cast ===
- Gale Harold as Brian Kinney
- Randy Harrison as Justin Taylor
- Hal Sparks as Michael Novotny
- Peter Paige as Emmett Honeycutt
- Scott Lowell as Ted Schmidt
- Thea Gill as Lindsay Peterson
- Michelle Clunie as Melanie Marcus
- Robert Gant as Ben Bruckner
- Sharon Gless as Debbie Novotny
- Jack Wetherall as Vic Grassi

=== Supporting cast ===
- Harris Allan as James "Hunter" Montgomery
- Sherry Miller as Jennifer Taylor
- Makyla Smith as Daphne Chanders
- Fabrizio Filippo as Ethan Gold
- Peter MacNeill as Carl Horvath
- David Gianopoulos as Jim Stockwell
- Carlo Rota as Gardner Vance
- Lindsey Connell as Tracey
- Stephanie Moore as Cynthia

== Episodes ==
No. overall	No. in season	Directed by	Written by	Original release date	Prod. code
43	1	Jeremy Podeswa	Ron Cowen & Daniel Lipman	March 2, 2003 (United States); April 7, 2003 (Canada)	301
At the RAGE comic book release party, Justin chose Ethan over Brian but Brian didn't seem to care. A week later, Michael bears the brunt of just how much he does care. Ted and Emmett explore the possibilities of a relationship, and the fate of Michael and Justin's comic book is up in the air.
44	2	Bruce McDonald	Ron Cowen, Daniel Lipman & Michael MacLennan	March 9, 2003 (United States); April 14, 2003 (Canada)	302
Having left Brian, Justin must find a way to pay for school; much to Lindsay's surprise, Melanie expresses her desire to have another baby; Emmett discovers a loophole in his relationship with Ted in order to honor a previously arranged liaison.
45	3	Laurie Lynd	Ron Cowen, Daniel Lipman & Efrem Seeger	March 16, 2003 (United States); April 21, 2003 (Canada)	303
Brian lends his personal expertise to the Center fundraiser and organizes 'Carnivale'. Lindsay and Melanie ask him to lend his sperm for their second child. Deb's nervous about being intimate with Carl, so Ted and Emmett divulge priceless gay-man secrets. Ben deals with the death of his former partner.
46	4	Kari Skogland	Ron Cowen, Daniel Lipman & Del Shores	March 30, 2003 (United States); April 28, 2003 (Canada)	304
Lindsay and Melanie ask Michael to father their second child. Brian's accused of molesting his nephew. Ted loves having Emmett in his heart - his condo's another story.
47	5	Kelly Makin	Ron Cowen, Daniel Lipman & Shawn Postoff	April 6, 2003 (United States); May 5, 2003 (Canada)	305
Brian wins Police Chief Stockwell's mayoral race account much to his friends' dismay. Ethan is offered representation after the Heifetz competition. Melanie and Lindsay try for a second child thanks to Michael's donation.
48	6	Bruce McDonald	Ron Cowen, Daniel Lipman, & Brad Fraser	April 13, 2003 (United States); May 12, 2003 (Canada)	306
With Brian's help Stockwell takes the lead in the polls. Ted readies Jerk-at-work.net for any surprise police raids. Michael confronts Ben about his steroid use. Ethan gives Justin a surprise performance.
49	7	Kevin Inch	Ron Cowen, Daniel Lipman & Michael MacLennan	April 20, 2003 (United States); May 19, 2003 (Canada)	307
Ted is out on bail and begs Brian to talk to Stockwell on his behalf. Justin confronts Ethan. Melanie is pregnant, much to everyone's delight. Ben promises to stop using steroids.
50	8	Bruce McDonald	Ron Cowen, Daniel Lipman & Efrem Seeger	April 27, 2003 (United States); May 26, 2003 (Canada)	308
Michael and Ben help out a young hustler. Justin begins an internship at Vanguard and a quest to win Brian back. Lindsay is blossoming in her new job at the gallery. Ted reacts to a sudden role-reversal with Emmett.
51	9	Kelly Makin	Ron Cowen, Daniel Lipman & Del Shores	May 11, 2003 (United States); June 2, 2003 (Canada)	309
Woody's is closed down after an Amateur Strip Contest. Stockwell discovers Brian's gay. Ted's humiliated when he tends bar at one of Emmett's soirées. Melanie promises Lindsay she'll work less during her pregnancy, just before landing the case of a lifetime.
52	10	Kevin Inch	Ron Cowen, Daniel Lipman & Shawn Postoff	May 18, 2003 (United States); June 9, 2003 (Canada)	310
Brian and Justin clash over Stockwell: he's good for Brian's business, but bad for the community. Ted takes a dangerous detour on his way to a weekend getaway. Melanie finds Michael's "doting dad" routine annoying. Hunter, the street hustler, calls in a favor from Ben.
53	11	Chris Grismer	Ron Cowen, Daniel Lipman & Brad Fraser	May 25, 2003 (United States); June 16, 2003 (Canada)	311
Brian is fired when he's caught undermining Stockwell's campaign. Ben and Michael tell Hunter he's positive. Ted's tempted to go to his first White Party with his new "friends".
54	12	David Wellington	Ron Cowen, Daniel Lipman & Michael MacLennan	June 8, 2003 (United States); June 23, 2003 (Canada)	312
Hunter reveals he was with Dumpster Boy before he was killed. Brian investigates based on Hunter's tip. Emmett is furious when Melanie and Lindsay insist Ted's an addict. Ted asks Emmett to share his experience.
55	13	Alex Chapple	Ron Cowen, Daniel Lipman & Efrem Seeger	June 15, 2003 (United States); June 30, 2003 (Canada)	313
Hunter collects evidence tying Dumpster Boy's murderer to Stockwell. Justin risks expulsion when he refuses to apologize for his anti-Stockwell posters. Emmett confronts Ted about his drug use.
56	14	Kelly Makin	Ron Cowen & Daniel Lipman	June 22, 2003 (United States); July 7, 2003 (Canada)	314
Brian risks everything to bring down Stockwell on the eve of the election. Ted finally has hit rock bottom. Hunter's mother arrives to take him away from Ben and Michael. Lindsay learns of Melanie's superstitions about getting through her first trimester.
