= Queer as Folk season 1 =

Queer as Folk
- Season 1
- DVD cover
- No. of episodes: 22

Release
- Original network: Showtime; Showcase
- Original release: December 3, 2000 – June 24, 2001

Season chronology
- Next → Season 2

The first season of Queer as Folk, an American and Canadian television series, consisted of twenty-two episodes and premiered on Showtime on December 3, 2000, in the United States and on Showcase on January 22, 2001, in Canada.

== Cast ==
=== Main cast ===
- Gale Harold as Brian Kinney
- Randy Harrison as Justin Taylor
- Hal Sparks as Michael Novotny
- Peter Paige as Emmett Honeycutt
- Scott Lowell as Ted Schmidt
- Thea Gill as Lindsay Peterson
- Michelle Clunie as Melanie Marcus
- Sharon Gless as Debbie Novotny
- Jack Wetherall as Vic Grassi

=== Supporting cast ===
- Chris Potter as Dr. David Cameron
- Sherry Miller as Jennifer Taylor
- Makyla Smith as Daphne Chanders
- Dean Armstrong as Blake Wyzecki
- Lindsey Connell as Tracey
- Stephanie Moore as Cynthia

== Episodes ==
No. overall	No. in season	Directed by	Written by	Original release date	Prod. code
1	1	Russell Mulcahy	Ron Cowen & Daniel Lipman	December 3, 2000 (United States) (Note: In the United States, the first episode aired #1 and #2 back-to-back.); January 22, 2001 (Canada) (Note: In Canada, the first episode consisted of #1-#3.)	101
After a night out at the club Babylon with Michael, Emmett and Ted; Brian picks up a cute guy named Justin for a night of fun, but afterwards coldly rebuffs Justin's attempts to see him again. Michael also gets lucky taking home a hunk only to be happily interrupted for a trip to the hospital after Brian learns that Lindsay and Melanie have had a baby boy, Gus.
2	2	Russell Mulcahy	Ron Cowen & Daniel Lipman	December 3, 2000 (United States)^{1} January 22, 2001 (Canada)^{2}	102
Michael stays in the closet at work, which causes some problems with an interested co-worker while at the same time he struggles with feelings of jealousy over Brian's relationship with Justin.
3	3	Russell Mulcahy	Ron Cowen & Daniel Lipman	December 10, 2000 (United States); January 22, 2001 (Canada)^{2}	103
Lindsay and Melanie have a bris for their new baby Gus, which Brian decides to miss until Michael convinces him otherwise. Brian decides to crash the party and put his parental foot down. Justin seeking to regain the attention of Brian decides to make himself noticed at Babylon. Meanwhile, Brian's involvement as the father of Gus causes some relationship strain between Lindsay and Melanie. Michael attempting to continue his straight act, runs into a co-worker in front of the gay bars. Also, Ted finally gets lucky with a guy who he's been denying the advances of all night, but ends up with devastating results.
4	4	Kevin Inch	Richard Kramer	December 17, 2000 (United States); January 29, 2001 (Canada)	104
While Ted lies in a drug-induced coma, Brian learns he's named the executor of his friend's living will. Also, Justin's mother suspects the truth about her son's sexuality and Michael and Emmett try to remove incriminating evidence from Ted's apartment but discover Ted's longtime crush on Michael.
5	5	Kari Skogland	Jason Schafer	January 7, 2001 (United States); February 2, 2001 (Canada)	105
Michael fends off the romantic interest of a female coworker who doesn't know he's gay and instead dates Dr. David Cameron, a handsome chiropractor, while Brian is propositioned by a potentially lucrative client of his firm. Meanwhile, Justin struggles to repair his fractured relationship with his mother Jennifer.
6	6	Kari Skogland	Jonathan Tolins	January 21, 2001 (United States); February 12, 2001 (Canada)	106
Michael's new boyfriend, David, gets into a tug of war with Brian over Michael, as Ted recovers from his O.D. by dating Roger, a stable but overweight chorus director. Also, Justin meets Lindsay, who is impressed with his artwork.
7	7	David Wellington	Ron Cowen & Daniel Lipman	January 28, 2001 (United States); February 19, 2001 (Canada)	107
Debbie meets Dr. David; Michael and David spend a weekend in the country; Justin's father learns the truth and decides to send Justin away to school; Brian's emotional hold on Michael and dislike for David intensifies.
8	8	Steve DiMarco	Richard Kramer	February 4, 2001 (United States); February 26, 2001 (Canada)	108
Justin's father attacks Brian outside Babylon; Michael gets a promotion at work; Justin moves in with Brian.
9	9	John Greyson	Jason Schafer & Jonathan Tolins	February 11, 2001 (United States); March 5, 2001 (Canada)	109
Michael decides to break up with David, who surprises Michael by asking him to move in with him; Lindsay and Melanie ask Brian to relinquish his parental rights to Gus; Emmett becomes addicted to cyber-sex.
10	10	John L'Ecuyer	Doug Guinan	February 18, 2001 (United States); March 12, 2001 (Canada)	110
David pressures Michael to move in with him; Brian's loft is burglarized; Justin runs away to New York City; Lindsay and Melanie begin to drift apart.
11	11	Michael DeCarlo	Jason Schafer & Jonathan Tolins	February 25, 2001 (United States); March 19, 2001 (Canada)	111
Michael ends the relationship with David; Ted and Emmett get tested for HIV; Brian throws Michael a surprise 30th birthday party and outs Michael to his co-worker; Emmett makes a pact with God.
12	12	John Greyson	Richard Kramer, Ron Cowen & Daniel Lipman	March 4, 2001 (United States); March 26, 2001 (Canada)	112
Michael and David enjoy their new-found domestic bliss; Emmett joins See the Light, a conversion therapy religious group; Lindsay and Melanie continue to fight about Brian, finances and their future; Ted becomes very sexually active.
13	13	Ron Oliver	Drew Z. Greenberg	March 11, 2001 (United States); April 2, 2001 (Canada)	113
Brian sleeps with a co-worker who then files a sexual harassment lawsuit against him; Emmett continues to try to go straight; Melanie cheats on Lindsay with another woman.
14	14	Michael DeCarlo	Doug Guinan	March 18, 2001 (United States); April 9, 2001 (Canada)	114
Brian is named in the sexual harassment suit and turns to Melanie for legal advice; Emmett starts dating a woman in his continuing attempt to go straight; Michael lies to David about seeing Brian.
15	15	Alex Chapple	Garth Wingfield	April 1, 2001 (United States); April 16, 2001 (Canada)	115
Lindsay leaves Gus in Brian's care on the weekend of the Leather Ball. Michael is nervous about meeting David's 12-year-old son Hank. Ted explores his BDSM fantasies. Brian comes out to his father after he learns that Jack has cancer.
16	16	Jeremy Podeswa	Jason Schafer	April 8, 2001 (United States); April 23, 2001 (Canada)	116
Michael and David disagree about finances; a strange Frenchman moves in with Lindsay and Gus causing a stir; Justin is suspended from school after flipping off his teacher.
17	17	Michael DeCarlo	Jonathan Tolins	April 15, 2001 (United States); April 30, 2001 (Canada)	117
David and Michael host a high-society fundraiser but Michael excludes the gang; Lindsay and Guillaume prepare for the big wedding day; Justin continues to be harassed at school.
18	18	Russell Mulcahy	Ron Cowen, Daniel Lipman, Jason Schafer & Jonathan Tolins	April 22, 2001 (United States); May 7, 2001 (Canada)	118
Brian discovers David at the baths; Justin finds out his parents are getting a divorce; Ted reconnects with Blake; a hunk from Babylon hits on Michael.
19	19	David Wellington	Garth Wingfield	April 29, 2001 (United States); May 14, 2001 (Canada)	119
In the throes of a hot three-way Brian gets upsetting news; Daphne asks Justin to take her virginity; Ted wants Blake, despite his crystal meth addiction.
20	20	Russell Mulcahy	Jason Schafer & Jonathan Tolins	May 6, 2001 (United States); May 7, 2001 (Canada)	120
Who will be crowned King of Babylon? An innocent trip to the mall lands Vic in jail; Brian is beaten at his own game.
21	21	Michael DeCarlo	Garth Wingfield	May 13, 2001 (United States); May 14, 2001 (Canada)	121
Brian is chosen 'Ad person of the Year' and encouraged to take his talent to the Big Apple; Vic appears in court to plead his case; Blake gets a job; David's ex-wife's divorce takes him to Portland.
22	22	Alex Chapple	Ron Cowen & Daniel Lipman	May 20, 2001 (United States); May 21, 2001 (Canada)	122
Brian turns 30; Michael and David prepare for their move to Portland; Ted faces the truth about Blake; Justin and Daphne attend their prom where unexpected events take place.
