= Queer as Folk season 2 =

Queer as Folk
- Season 2
- DVD cover
- No. of episodes: 20

Release
- Original network: Showtime; Showcase
- Original release: January 6 – June 16, 2002

Season chronology
- ← Previous; Season 1 Next → Season 3

The second season of Queer as Folk, an American and Canadian television series, consisted of twenty episodes and premiered on Showtime on January 6, 2002, in the United States and on Showcase on January 21, 2002, in Canada.

== Cast ==
=== Main cast ===
- Gale Harold as Brian Kinney
- Randy Harrison as Justin Taylor
- Hal Sparks as Michael Novotny
- Peter Paige as Emmett Honeycutt
- Scott Lowell as Ted Schmidt
- Thea Gill as Lindsay Peterson
- Michelle Clunie as Melanie Marcus
- Robert Gant as Ben Bruckner
- Sharon Gless as Debbie Novotny
- Jack Wetherall as Vic Grassi

=== Supporting cast ===
- Sherry Miller as Jennifer Taylor
- Makyla Smith as Daphne Chanders
- Fabrizio Filippo as Ethan Gold
- Peter MacNeill as Carl Horvath
- Bruce Gray as George Shickel
- Carlo Rota as Gardner Vance
- Lindsey Connell as Tracey
- Stephanie Moore as Cynthia
- Nancy Anne Sakovich as Leda

== Episodes ==
No. overall	No. in season	Directed by	Written by	Original release date	Prod. code
23	1	Alex Chapple	Ron Cowen & Daniel Lipman	January 6, 2002 (United States); January 21, 2002 (Canada)	201
Suffering post-trauma after the bashing, Justin can't remember the fateful night and Brian can't forget it. Lindsay pops a question to Melanie at her sister's wedding. Michael returns to Pittsburgh just as Chris Hobbs is sentenced.
24	2	John Greyson	Ron Cowen & Daniel Lipman	January 13, 2002 (United States); January 28, 2002 (Canada)	202
Justin is unable to process Chris Hobbs' attack, or to accept physical contact, despite Brian's best efforts. Ted is fired for surfing porn at work. Michael and Emmett take jobs as naked waiters. This time, it's Melanie who proposes to Lindsay.
25	3	Michael DeCarlo	Ron Cowen, Daniel Lipman & Karen Walton	January 20, 2002 (United States); February 4, 2002 (Canada)	203
Will Brian accept a Hero Award for saving Justin? Ted's favorite author, Howard Bellweather, is in town to protest Brian's award while collecting his own. Emmett's working for fabulous men who seem like the politically correct characters of the new gay TV drama, "Gay as Blazes"! Michael wants to reconnect with Brian at the comic convention.
26	4	Kevin Inch	Ron Cowen, Daniel Lipman & Michael MacLennan	January 27, 2002 (United States); February 11, 2002 (Canada)	204
Brian, Michael, Justin, Emmett, Ted, Lindsay, Melanie and Debbie all overcome various obstacles to show their PRIDE in Pittsburgh's annual parade.
27	5	David Wellington	Ron Cowen, Daniel Lipman & Efrem Seeger	February 3, 2002 (United States); February 18, 2002 (Canada)	205
Having lost hand control from his bashing, Justin quits art school (he's lost the fine motor skills needed to hold a brush.) Michael decides to quit the Big Q and risks all to buy a comic book store. Ted ditches his new accounting job to start his own porno website.
28	6	Bruce McDonald	Ron Cowen, Daniel Lipman, Matt Pyken & Michael Berns	February 10, 2002 (United States); February 25, 2002 (Canada)	206
Justin and Brian negotiate their relationship - it's not like your parents! Ted's new business flourishes thanks to Emmett. Could one of Michael's first customers turn out to be the love of his life? Lindsay can't stand Ted's dirty little business. Melanie shares a dirty little secret of her own!
29	7	Michael DeCarlo	Ron Cowen, Daniel Lipman & Blair Fell	February 17, 2002 (United States); March 4, 2002 (Canada)	207
Michael decides to continue dating HIV positive Ben, despite the objections of Brian, Ted, Emmett, and his mother, Debbie. Lindsay and Melanie struggle to get money for their wedding from Lindsay's parents. Success on Ted's porno website is swelling Emmett's… ego.
30	8	Alex Chapple	Ron Cowen, Daniel Lipman & Michael MacLennan	March 3, 2002 (United States); March 11, 2002 (Canada)	208
Michael tries to forget Ben by re-entering the dating scene. Justin has an encounter with a boy closer to his age than Brian. Emmett is surprised when he meets his secret admirer - very surprised.
31	9	Bruce McDonald	Ron Cowen, Daniel Lipman & Efrem Seeger	March 10, 2002 (United States); March 18, 2002 (Canada)	209
Michael fights to get Ben back in his life - he has to prove he can handle the HIV positive situation. Brian is introduced to his mother's minister - but they've already met (not in church). Ted has a really hard time dealing with some performance enhancing drugs.
32	10	Michael DeCarlo	Ron Cowen, Daniel Lipman, Matt Pyken & Michael Berns	March 17, 2002 (United States); March 25, 2002 (Canada)	210
Michael mourns the death of his comic book hero, Captain Astro, while Debbie finds a real life murder victim behind the diner. Emmett helps George to enjoy himself. Melanie & Lindsay are inspired by the contents of Lindsay's Granny Faye's secret letters.
33	11	Kevin Inch	Ron Cowen, Daniel Lipman & Karen Walton	March 31, 2002 (United States); April 1, 2002 (Canada)	211
It's time for Lindsay and Melanie's wedding! It promises to be a day of beauty and love, provided they can overcome the many obstacles fate throws in their path. Brian, Emmett, Ted, George, Vic, Debbie, Michael, and Justin all pitch in to make sure they succeed.
34	12	Thom Best	Ron Cowen, Daniel Lipman & Michael MacLennan	April 7, 2002 (United States); April 8, 2002 (Canada)	212
Michael has trouble dealing with the news that his new boyfriend Ben once slept with his best friend Brian. Debbie needs to do something about the dead boy found behind her diner. She impresses Detective Horvath with her sleuthing. Ted gets a shot at being accepted by the elite A-Gays of Pittsburgh.
35	13	John Greyson	Ron Cowen, Daniel Lipman & Efrem Seeger	April 14, 2002 (United States); April 15, 2002 (Canada)	213
Divina Devore, Pittsburgh's very own drag queen is back in town! She dated Debbie 30 years ago, and (s)he looks a lot like Michael. Justin becomes a go-go dancer at Babylon to earn money for school. Melanie and Lindsay struggle to get Gus accepted for preschool.
36	14	John Fawcett	Ron Cowen, Daniel Lipman, Matt Pyken & Michael Berns	April 28, 2002 (United States); April 29, 2002 (Canada)	214
Justin's making too much money as a go-go dancer to care about his suffering schoolwork. George offers to take Emmett on a world tour! Detective Carl Horvath returns to the diner, to ask Debbie out on a date.
37	15	Jeremy Podeswa	Ron Cowen, Daniel Lipman & Karen Walton	May 5, 2002 (United States); May 6, 2002 (Canada)	215
Michael and Justin join forces to create their own comic book. Emmett is barred from speaking at George's funeral. Melanie and Lindsay enlist Leda to help renovate their attic.
38	16	Bruce McDonald	Ron Cowen, Daniel Lipman & Michael MacLennan	May 12, 2002 (United States); May 13, 2002 (Canada)	216
Brian ignores Justin's birthday, so Melanie and Lindsay take him to a violin concert - where he meets the gorgeous and talented Ethan. Michael's surprise party for Ben is a disaster. Ted falls for Luke - he seems perfect, but can he accept Ted's career in porn?
39	17	David Wellington	Ron Cowen, Daniel Lipman & Efrem Seeger	May 26, 2002 (United States); May 27, 2002 (Canada)	217
Brian has to cancel plans with Justin to impress his new boss at work. Emmett receives a VERY generous gift from the late George. Melanie and Lindsay fight off the dreaded Lesbian Bed Death.
40	18	Alex Chapple	Ron Cowen, Daniel Lipman, Matt Pyken & Michael Berns	June 2, 2002 (United States); June 3, 2002 (Canada)	218
Michael's worst fears come true when Ben is hospitalized. Justin wishes Brian was more romantic - like Ethan. Emmett considers a million-dollar offer to keep his relationship with George a secret.
41	19	Michael DeCarlo	Ron Cowen, Daniel Lipman, Efrem Seeger, Michael MacLennan, Matt Pyken & Michael Berns	June 9, 2002 (United States); June 10, 2002 (Canada)	219
Michael is tempted to expose Justin's affair with Ethan to Brian. Ted's become immune to porn. Melanie and Lindsay ask Leda to leave. Bowling Showdown: Cops vs. Queers!
42	20	David Wellington	Ron Cowen & Daniel Lipman	June 16, 2002 (United States); June 17, 2002 (Canada)	220
Justin is forced to choose between Brian and Ethan. Ben's going away for six months, but only with Michael's blessing. Ted's in love - with Emmett!
