= List of Queer as Folk episodes =

Queer as Folk is a drama television series. An American–Canadian co-production. The series ran between December 2000 and August 2005 and was produced for Showtime and Showcase by Cowlip Productions, Tony Jonas Productions, Temple Street Productions and Showtime Networks in association with Crowe Entertainment. It was developed and written by Ron Cowen and Daniel Lipman, who were the showrunners, and also the executive producers along with Tony Jonas, former President of Warner Bros. Television.

The series was based on the British series created by Russell T Davies. Although it was set in Pittsburgh, PA, much of the series was actually shot in Toronto and employed various Canadian directors known for their independent film work (including Bruce McDonald, David Wellington, Kelly Makin, John Greyson, Jeremy Podeswa and Michael DeCarlo) as well as Australian director Russell Mulcahy, who directed the pilot episode. Additional writers in the later seasons included Michael MacLennan, Efrem Seeger, Brad Fraser, Del Shores, and Shawn Postoff.

== Series overview ==
Season	Episodes	Originally released		Rating	Viewers (millions)
Season	Episodes	First released	Last released	Rating	Viewers (millions)
1	22	December 3, 2000	May 20, 2001	0.86	1.362
2	20	January 6, 2002	June 16, 2002	0.79	1.244
3	14	March 2, 2003	June 22, 2003	0.71	1.086
4	14	April 18, 2004	July 18, 2004	0.34	0.504
5	13	May 22, 2005	August 7, 2005	0.30	0.440

== Episodes ==
=== Season 1 (2000–01) ===
No. overall	No. in season	Directed by	Written by	Original release date	Prod. code
1	1	Russell Mulcahy	Ron Cowen & Daniel Lipman	December 3, 2000 (United States) (Note: In the United States, the first episode aired #1 and #2 back-to-back.); January 22, 2001 (Canada) (Note: In Canada, the first episode consisted of #1-#3.)	101
2	2	Russell Mulcahy	Ron Cowen & Daniel Lipman	December 3, 2000 (United States)^{1} January 22, 2001 (Canada)^{2}	102
3	3	Russell Mulcahy	Ron Cowen & Daniel Lipman	December 10, 2000 (United States); January 22, 2001 (Canada)^{2}	103
4	4	Kevin Inch	Richard Kramer	December 17, 2000 (United States); January 29, 2001 (Canada)	104
5	5	Kari Skogland	Jason Schafer	January 7, 2001 (United States); February 2, 2001 (Canada)	105
6	6	Kari Skogland	Jonathan Tolins	January 21, 2001 (United States); February 12, 2001 (Canada)	106
7	7	David Wellington	Ron Cowen & Daniel Lipman	January 28, 2001 (United States); February 19, 2001 (Canada)	107
8	8	Steve DiMarco	Richard Kramer	February 4, 2001 (United States); February 26, 2001 (Canada)	108
9	9	John Greyson	Jason Schafer & Jonathan Tolins	February 11, 2001 (United States); March 5, 2001 (Canada)	109
10	10	John L'Ecuyer	Doug Guinan	February 18, 2001 (United States); March 12, 2001 (Canada)	110
11	11	Michael DeCarlo	Jason Schafer & Jonathan Tolins	February 25, 2001 (United States); March 19, 2001 (Canada)	111
12	12	John Greyson	Richard Kramer, Ron Cowen & Daniel Lipman	March 4, 2001 (United States); March 26, 2001 (Canada)	112
13	13	Ron Oliver	Drew Z. Greenberg	March 11, 2001 (United States); April 2, 2001 (Canada)	113
14	14	Michael DeCarlo	Doug Guinan	March 18, 2001 (United States); April 9, 2001 (Canada)	114
15	15	Alex Chapple	Garth Wingfield	April 1, 2001 (United States); April 16, 2001 (Canada)	115
16	16	Jeremy Podeswa	Jason Schafer	April 8, 2001 (United States); April 23, 2001 (Canada)	116
17	17	Michael DeCarlo	Jonathan Tolins	April 15, 2001 (United States); April 30, 2001 (Canada)	117
18	18	Russell Mulcahy	Ron Cowen, Daniel Lipman, Jason Schafer & Jonathan Tolins	April 22, 2001 (United States); May 7, 2001 (Canada)	118
19	19	David Wellington	Garth Wingfield	April 29, 2001 (United States); May 14, 2001 (Canada)	119
20	20	Russell Mulcahy	Jason Schafer & Jonathan Tolins	May 6, 2001 (United States); May 7, 2001 (Canada)	120
21	21	Michael DeCarlo	Garth Wingfield	May 13, 2001 (United States); May 14, 2001 (Canada)	121
22	22	Alex Chapple	Ron Cowen & Daniel Lipman	May 20, 2001 (United States); May 21, 2001 (Canada)	122

=== Season 2 (2002) ===
No. overall	No. in season	Directed by	Written by	Original release date	Prod. code
23	1	Alex Chapple	Ron Cowen & Daniel Lipman	January 6, 2002 (United States); January 21, 2002 (Canada)	201
24	2	John Greyson	Ron Cowen & Daniel Lipman	January 13, 2002 (United States); January 28, 2002 (Canada)	202
25	3	Michael DeCarlo	Ron Cowen, Daniel Lipman & Karen Walton	January 20, 2002 (United States); February 4, 2002 (Canada)	203
26	4	Kevin Inch	Ron Cowen, Daniel Lipman & Michael MacLennan	January 27, 2002 (United States); February 11, 2002 (Canada)	204
27	5	David Wellington	Ron Cowen, Daniel Lipman & Efrem Seeger	February 3, 2002 (United States); February 18, 2002 (Canada)	205
28	6	Bruce McDonald	Ron Cowen, Daniel Lipman, Matt Pyken & Michael Berns	February 10, 2002 (United States); February 25, 2002 (Canada)	206
29	7	Michael DeCarlo	Ron Cowen, Daniel Lipman & Blair Fell	February 17, 2002 (United States); March 4, 2002 (Canada)	207
30	8	Alex Chapple	Ron Cowen, Daniel Lipman & Michael MacLennan	March 3, 2002 (United States); March 11, 2002 (Canada)	208
31	9	Bruce McDonald	Ron Cowen, Daniel Lipman & Efrem Seeger	March 10, 2002 (United States); March 18, 2002 (Canada)	209
32	10	Michael DeCarlo	Ron Cowen, Daniel Lipman, Matt Pyken & Michael Berns	March 17, 2002 (United States); March 25, 2002 (Canada)	210
33	11	Kevin Inch	Ron Cowen, Daniel Lipman & Karen Walton	March 31, 2002 (United States); April 1, 2002 (Canada)	211
34	12	Thom Best	Ron Cowen, Daniel Lipman & Michael MacLennan	April 7, 2002 (United States); April 8, 2002 (Canada)	212
35	13	John Greyson	Ron Cowen, Daniel Lipman & Efrem Seeger	April 14, 2002 (United States); April 15, 2002 (Canada)	213
36	14	John Fawcett	Ron Cowen, Daniel Lipman, Matt Pyken & Michael Berns	April 28, 2002 (United States); April 29, 2002 (Canada)	214
37	15	Jeremy Podeswa	Ron Cowen, Daniel Lipman & Karen Walton	May 5, 2002 (United States); May 6, 2002 (Canada)	215
38	16	Bruce McDonald	Ron Cowen, Daniel Lipman & Michael MacLennan	May 12, 2002 (United States); May 13, 2002 (Canada)	216
39	17	David Wellington	Ron Cowen, Daniel Lipman & Efrem Seeger	May 26, 2002 (United States); May 27, 2002 (Canada)	217
40	18	Alex Chapple	Ron Cowen, Daniel Lipman, Matt Pyken & Michael Berns	June 2, 2002 (United States); June 3, 2002 (Canada)	218
41	19	Michael DeCarlo	Ron Cowen, Daniel Lipman, Efrem Seeger, Michael MacLennan, Matt Pyken & Michael Berns	June 9, 2002 (United States); June 10, 2002 (Canada)	219
42	20	David Wellington	Ron Cowen & Daniel Lipman	June 16, 2002 (United States); June 17, 2002 (Canada)	220

=== Season 3 (2003) ===
No. overall	No. in season	Directed by	Written by	Original release date	Prod. code
43	1	Jeremy Podeswa	Ron Cowen & Daniel Lipman	March 2, 2003 (United States); April 7, 2003 (Canada)	301
44	2	Bruce McDonald	Ron Cowen, Daniel Lipman & Michael MacLennan	March 9, 2003 (United States); April 14, 2003 (Canada)	302
45	3	Laurie Lynd	Ron Cowen, Daniel Lipman & Efrem Seeger	March 16, 2003 (United States); April 21, 2003 (Canada)	303
46	4	Kari Skogland	Ron Cowen, Daniel Lipman & Del Shores	March 30, 2003 (United States); April 28, 2003 (Canada)	304
47	5	Kelly Makin	Ron Cowen, Daniel Lipman & Shawn Postoff	April 6, 2003 (United States); May 5, 2003 (Canada)	305
48	6	Bruce McDonald	Ron Cowen, Daniel Lipman, & Brad Fraser	April 13, 2003 (United States); May 12, 2003 (Canada)	306
49	7	Kevin Inch	Ron Cowen, Daniel Lipman & Michael MacLennan	April 20, 2003 (United States); May 19, 2003 (Canada)	307
50	8	Bruce McDonald	Ron Cowen, Daniel Lipman & Efrem Seeger	April 27, 2003 (United States); May 26, 2003 (Canada)	308
51	9	Kelly Makin	Ron Cowen, Daniel Lipman & Del Shores	May 11, 2003 (United States); June 2, 2003 (Canada)	309
52	10	Kevin Inch	Ron Cowen, Daniel Lipman & Shawn Postoff	May 18, 2003 (United States); June 9, 2003 (Canada)	310
53	11	Chris Grismer	Ron Cowen, Daniel Lipman & Brad Fraser	May 25, 2003 (United States); June 16, 2003 (Canada)	311
54	12	David Wellington	Ron Cowen, Daniel Lipman & Michael MacLennan	June 8, 2003 (United States); June 23, 2003 (Canada)	312
55	13	Alex Chapple	Ron Cowen, Daniel Lipman & Efrem Seeger	June 15, 2003 (United States); June 30, 2003 (Canada)	313
56	14	Kelly Makin	Ron Cowen & Daniel Lipman	June 22, 2003 (United States); July 7, 2003 (Canada)	314

=== Season 4 (2004) ===
No. overall	No. in season	Directed by	Written by	Original release date	Prod. code
57	1	Kelly Makin	Ron Cowen & Daniel Lipman	April 18, 2004 (United States); April 19, 2004 (Canada)	401
58	2	Jeremy Podeswa	Ron Cowen, Daniel Lipman & Michael MacLennan	April 25, 2004 (United States); April 26, 2004 (Canada)	402
59	3	Chris Grismer	Ron Cowen, Daniel Lipman & Brad Fraser	May 2, 2004 (United States); May 3, 2004 (Canada)	403
60	4	Kevin Inch	Ron Cowen, Daniel Lipman & Del Shores	May 9, 2004 (United States); May 10, 2004 (Canada)	404
61	5	Kelly Makin	Ron Cowen, Daniel Lipman & Shawn Postoff	May 16, 2004 (United States); May 17, 2004 (Canada)	405
62	6	Bruce McDonald	Ron Cowen, Daniel Lipman & Michael MacLennan	May 23, 2004 (United States); May 24, 2004 (Canada)	406
63	7	Alex Chapple	Ron Cowen, Daniel Lipman & Brad Fraser	May 30, 2004 (United States); May 31, 2004 (Canada)	407
64	8	Bruce McDonald	Ron Cowen, Daniel Lipman & Del Shores	June 6, 2004 (United States); June 7, 2004 (Canada)	408
65	9	Kevin Inch	Ron Cowen, Daniel Lipman & Shawn Postoff	June 13, 2004 (United States); June 14, 2004 (Canada)	409
66	10	John Fawcett	Ron Cowen, Daniel Lipman & Michael MacLennan	June 20, 2004 (United States); June 21, 2004 (Canada)	410
67	11	Thom Best	Ron Cowen, Daniel Lipman & Del Shores	June 27, 2004 (United States); June 28, 2004 (Canada)	411
68	12	Kelly Makin	Ron Cowen, Daniel Lipman & Brad Fraser	July 4, 2004 (United States); July 5, 2004 (Canada)	412
69	13	Michael DeCarlo	Ron Cowen, Daniel Lipman & Shawn Postoff	July 11, 2004 (United States); July 12, 2004 (Canada)	413
70	14	Kelly Makin	Ron Cowen & Daniel Lipman	July 18, 2004 (United States); July 19, 2004 (Canada)	414

=== Season 5 (2005) ===
No. overall	No. in season	Directed by	Written by	Original release date	Prod. code
71	1	Kelly Makin	Ron Cowen & Daniel Lipman	May 22, 2005 (United States) (Note: In the United States, the season premiere consisted of episodes #1 and #2.); May 23, 2005 (Canada)	501
72	2	Michael DeCarlo	Ron Cowen, Daniel Lipman & Del Shores	May 22, 2005 (United States)^{1} May 30, 2005 (Canada)	502
73	3	Michael DeCarlo	Ron Cowen, Daniel Lipman & Brad Fraser	May 29, 2005 (United States); June 6, 2005 (Canada)	503
74	4	Kelly Makin	Ron Cowen, Daniel Lipman & Michael MacLennan	June 5, 2005 (United States); June 13, 2005 (Canada)	504
75	5	Chris Grismer	Ron Cowen, Daniel Lipman & Shawn Postoff	June 12, 2005 (United States); June 20, 2005 (Canada)	505
76	6	Alex Chapple	Ron Cowen, Daniel Lipman & Del Shores	June 19, 2005 (United States); June 27, 2005 (Canada)	506
77	7	Thom Best	Ron Cowen, Daniel Lipman & Shawn Postoff	June 26, 2005 (United States); July 4, 2005 (Canada)	507
78	8	Kevin Inch	Ron Cowen, Daniel Lipman & Michael MacLennan	July 3, 2005 (United States); July 11, 2005 (Canada)	508
79	9	David Wellington	Ron Cowen, Daniel Lipman & Brad Fraser	July 10, 2005 (United States); July 18, 2005 (Canada)	509
80	10	Kelly Makin	Ron Cowen, Daniel Lipman & Del Shores	July 17, 2005 (United States); July 25, 2005 (Canada)	510
81	11	David Wellington	Ron Cowen, Daniel Lipman & Brad Fraser	July 24, 2005 (United States); August 1, 2005 (Canada)	511
82	12	John Fawcett	Ron Cowen, Daniel Lipman & Michael MacLennan	July 31, 2005 (United States); August 8, 2005 (Canada)	512
83	13	Kelly Makin	Ron Cowen & Daniel Lipman	August 7, 2005 (United States); August 15, 2005 (Canada)	513
