= List of Queer as Folk characters =

This is a list of characters in the Showtime series Queer as Folk. The characters are listed alphabetically by their last name or by the name which appears in the episode credits.

== Drew Boyd ==
Drew Boyd
- First appearance: Season 4, Episode 9
- Last appearance: Season 5, Episode 12
- Created by: Ron Cowen; Daniel Lipman
- Portrayed by: Matt Battaglia
- UK counterpart: None

In-universe information
- Occupation: Quarterback (Pittsburgh Ironmen)
- Spouse: Sierra (ex-wife)
- Significant others: Emmett Honeycutt (ex-boyfriend)

Drew Boyd is the quarterback of the fictional Pittsburgh Ironmen. He was introduced in season four when he hired Emmett Honeycutt to cater the party for his engagement to his girlfriend, Sierra. At the party Drew and his teammates make disparaging homophobic remarks about Emmett and a waiter, and Emmett confronts him about it. The next day, when Emmett visits Drew's house to pick up his check, Drew becomes aggressively flirtatious and the two have sex on the living room floor.

Although Drew and Emmett continue the affair, Drew does not identify as gay, instead thinking of himself as just a man who occasionally enjoys sex with other men (or possibly on the down-low). Over time, however, his feelings for Emmett become less purely sexual and more romantic. Drew even allows Emmett to persuade him to model in a Brown Athletics underwear campaign for Brian's agency Kinnetik. Despite an agreement that Emmett must never show up at Drew's games, Emmett accompanies Ted to the Ironmen stadium. Unfortunately, they run into Drew's fiancée who is delighted to see Emmett and brings them to the locker room. Drew breaks off the affair, but later seeks to resume it, admitting to missing Emmett. However, Emmett turns him down when Drew reveals he still intends to marry Sierra and keep the affair up.

In season five, Emmett receives anonymous phone calls and believes he is being stalked. It turns out to be a panicking Drew, who was being threatened with being outed by a tabloid. Drew appears on the news station that employs Emmett for an interview and comes out, kissing Emmett on live television and losing each of them their jobs. Drew and Emmett resume their relationship and Drew is eventually picked back up by the Ironmen after they lose several games in a row.

The relationship finally ends on a bittersweet note when Emmett spots Drew flirting with another man. Rather than being angry or jealous, Emmett recognizes that Drew, being so newly out, needs time to explore his new-found gay world.

== Ben Bruckner ==
Ben Bruckner
- First appearance: Season 2, Episode 6
- Last appearance: Season 5, Episode 13
- Created by: Ron Cowen; Daniel Lipman
- Portrayed by: Robert Gant
- UK counterpart: None

In-universe information
- Aliases: Benjamin Bruckner (birth name); Benjamin Novotny-Bruckner (full name)
- Title(s): Benjamin Bruckner, Ph.D.
- Occupation: Author; College professor
- Spouse: Michael Novotny (husband)
- Children: Hunter Novotny-Bruckner (adopted son, with Michael); Jenny Rebecca Novotny-Marcus (step-daughter, via Michael)
- Relatives: Deborah "Debbie" Novotny (mother-in-law)

Benjamin "Ben" Novotny-Bruckner (né Bruckner) (portrayed by Robert Gant) became a main character during season two, when he is the first customer in Michael Novotny's comic book store. He is a gay studies professor at Carnegie Mellon University, and the author of the non-fiction book RU12 and the unpublished novel Gentlemen in Paris. Upon first meeting Michael, he states that he is a Pisces.

The two begin to date, but Michael decides to stop after finding out that Ben is HIV positive. After several failed attempts at dating other men, Michael realizes he is in love with Ben, and that he will have to accept his HIV status. Debbie also initially disapproves of the relationship because of Ben's HIV status. However, when Ben is hospitalized due to complications from his HIV medication, Debbie sees how devoted Michael is to Ben and realizes that Michael's happiness is more important than her worries.

In the third season, Ben learns that the man who gave him HIV has died which greatly upsets him and drives him to begin using steroids and exercise obsessively. Ben's increasingly erratic behavior begins taking a toll on his relationship with Michael. In a desperate attempt to get through to Ben, Michael threatens to infect himself with Ben's used needle in order to get him to stop taking steroids. Ben and Michael later begin providing shelter to a teenage prostitute, Hunter Montgomery, after encountering him soliciting outside their apartment. Ben feels a special bond with the troubled youth, especially after learning Hunter is HIV positive as well. Michael is initially less patient with Hunter's presence in their home, but the couple grow to accept Hunter as a member of the family. Ben and Michael become Hunter's legal guardians by the beginning of the fourth season after winning custody from his abusive mother.

When Michael and Justin get a deal for a movie adaptation of their comic book, Ben becomes extremely envious, mainly because his own book, Gentlemen in Paris, can't get published. Ben begins secretly meeting with Anthony, a former student who flirtatiously offers praise for his work. However, Ben is horrified when Anthony reveals that Ben's novel inspired him to intentionally infect himself with HIV. Later, Ben and Michael travel to Toronto, Ontario, Canada for the start of the Liberty Ride. On the bus ride up to Canada, Ben asks Michael to be his husband. The two get married in Canada, but they experience trouble in returning to the United States as their marriage will not be recognized once they return.

In the fifth season, Ben and Michael move into a house on a traditional street, to which Brian accuses them of being 'conformist homosexuals'. This does not matter to the couple who are proud of their new home and two children. However, this does not last long as after Hunter's HIV status is revealed at school and his ex-girlfriend starts dating someone new, he decides to leave home. Ben takes Hunter's departure particularly hard and becomes extremely distraught and angry with both Michael and himself, until they receive an e-mail from Hunter a few weeks later. Ben later tirelessly parades to stop "Proposition 14" which would take away gay civil rights and is present during the bombing of Babylon which severely injures Michael. During the vigil for the Babylon victims, Ben displays uncharacteristic rage when he brutally beats up a counter-protester who began mocking Michael's near death. Hunter reunites with Ben and Michael after the bombing and the couple legally adopts him in the series finale.

Throughout the series, Ben is characterized as a compassionate person who seldom becomes outwardly angry, upset, or emotional. He adheres to the Buddhist ideals and advocates for "living in the now". In adjusting to his HIV status, Ben does his best to take care of himself physically and to maintain a peaceful and serene perspective in facing life's challenges, which earns him the nickname "Zen Ben" from Brian.

Despite his academic background and somewhat esoteric philosophies, Ben integrates well with Michael's circle of friends. Ben and Brian are generally cordial to one another, although they occasionally clash over their conflicting values and mutual interest in Michael. It is revealed in season 2 that Ben and Brian shared a brief prior sexual encounter, which initially disturbs Michael. However, unlike Michael's ex-boyfriend, David Cameron, Ben does not openly resent Michael's and Brian's close and somewhat co-dependent friendship and he calmly acknowledges that when two people enter a relationship, they each bring his own history. When Brian and Michael end their friendship in season 5 Ben encourages Brian to make amends and pushes Michael to attend Brian's wedding by reminding Michael that Brian loves him immensely.

== Dr. David Cameron ==
David Cameron
- First appearance: Season 1, Episode 5
- Last appearance: Season 1, Episode 22
- Created by: Ron Cowen; Daniel Lipman
- Portrayed by: Chris Potter
- UK counterpart: Cameron Roberts (Peter O'Brien)

In-universe information
- Nickname: Dr. David (by everyone)
- Occupation: Chiropractor
- Spouse: Lori (ex-wife)
- Significant others: Michael Novotny (ex-boyfriend)
- Children: Hank Cameron (son, with Lori)

Dr. David Cameron (or Dr. David, as he is commonly referred to by the other characters) is Michael's main love interest for all of season one. He has no relation to his namesake, David Cameron, former Prime Minister of the United Kingdom.

He was previously married but was later divorced, and he also has a son, Hank (portrayed by Ryan Cooley in one episode). David meets Michael after he injures his back working at the Q Mart. David is the chiropractor Michael is referred to, and later, when he sees Michael back at the Q Mart, asks him out, and the two begin to date, and eventually Michael moves in with David.

Nevertheless, they are almost constantly at odds with each other. For example, at one point, Dr. David is jealous of the relationship Michael has with Brian, and at one point forbids him from seeing Brian again. Michael, on the other hand, is put off by David's willingness to do everything, such as pay for dinner at restaurants, and at one point, Michael found out that David was not cashing the checks he was giving him to cover his share of their household expenses.

Michael often finds himself intimidated by the lavish lifestyle that Dr. David leads.

At the end of the first season, Dr. David decides to move back to Portland, Oregon to be with his son, and invites Michael to come with him. Michael was originally going to leave with him, but briefly stays behind after learning of the assault on Justin. In the second season it is revealed that Michael did follow Dr. David to Portland. During the first episode of season 2, Michael returns to Pittsburgh for a visit, and after Emmett catches him having sex with another man, he confesses that he and Dr. David are no longer together. Dr. David is neither seen nor heard from again for the rest of the series, although in season 2, Ted told a character with back pains that he "knows a good chiropractor," and, later, at one point in season 3, Emmett, after sleeping on Michael's couch all night, stated that he needed a chiropractor. He then looked at Michael and apologized.

== Daphne Chanders ==
Daphne Chanders
- First appearance: Season 1, Episode 1
- Last appearance: Season 5, Episode 13
- Created by: Ron Cowen; Daniel Lipman
- Portrayed by: Makyla Smith
- UK counterpart: Donna Clark (Carla Henry)

In-universe information
- Occupation: College student
- Family: Unnamed parents (father & mother)
- Significant others: Glen Reeves (ex-boyfriend)

Daphne Chanders appears in all five seasons, but is most prominently featured during the first two. She is Justin Taylor's best friend, and the first person who he comes out to. She is Justin's confidante for most of the first season, especially during the time his parents are in the middle of a messy divorce. Toward the end of the first season, she asks Justin to "be her first," and the two have sex with the help of a gay porn magazine to get Justin in the "mood." Later, Daphne becomes romantically interested in Justin, causing some tension between them. Justin tells her that even though they had sex together, he is not in love with her. However, Daphne reminds Justin that he once experienced the same feelings toward Brian Kinney as she is now feeling. The two reconcile and go as dates to their high school prom.

Daphne and Justin attend different colleges, and Justin sleeps at her apartment when he is fighting with Brian. He also lives with her briefly after he breaks up with Ethan while trying to get back with Brian. She is seen briefly in the fifth season talking to Justin while they are babysitting Michael's daughter, Jenny Rebecca, and in the final episode is mentioned as helping him find a place to stay in New York.

Despite being supportive of Justin's homosexuality, she occasionally shows frustration at the exclusive homosexual community. When a woman at an art gallery mistakes her for a lesbian, she does not correct her despite Justin's disapproval, claiming she wants to be "one of the cool kids." She grows angry with Justin after he fails to return her feelings after they sleep together and is disappointed when Cody and Justin will not let her help with the Pink Posse because she is straight.

== Vic Grassi ==
Vic Grassi
- First appearance: Season 1, Episode 2
- Last appearance: Season 4, Episode 14
- Created by: Ron Cowen; Daniel Lipman
- Portrayed by: Jack Wetherall
- UK counterpart: Bernard Thomas (Andy Devine)

In-universe information
- Aliases: Victor Antonio Grassi (full name)
- Nickname: Vic
- Occupation: Chef
- Family: Deborah "Debbie" Novotny (older sister); Michael Novotny (nephew, via Debbie)
- Significant others: Rodney (boyfriend/life partner)

Victor Antonio "Vic" Grassi (or 'Uncle Vic' as other characters called him) is Debbie Novotny's brother and Michael Novotny's uncle. He is old enough to remember and enjoy the decadence of the post-Stonewall/pre-AIDS gay culture of the 1970s and early 1980s and would sometimes reminisce about his carefree life as a young 20-something during the disco era.

Before the start of the series, Vic, who is HIV-positive, emerged from a lengthy hospital stay and joined Debbie on a trip to Italy, expecting to die before having to pay any credit card bills from their vacation.

For the first three seasons of the show, Vic lives with Debbie in her house. She helps Vic manage his medications, while Vic contributes his disability check to cover his portion of the household expenses. Vic gives Justin his ID card to get into Babylon in one of the first episodes, saying that he had "paid his dues" and doubts he will need it again. Despite those words, Vic visits at Babylon on several later occasions.

Vic is arrested for solicitation in the men's room at a mall during the first season. He is eventually cleared of the charges when it is determined that the arresting officer had entrapped him.

Vic works at the Liberty Diner with Debbie for a short time, after learning that his disability payments might be cut off. Having previously had a career as a pastry chef, he finds it difficult to adjust to his role as a short-order cook. In the second season, Debbie berates Vic when he can not manage to make a wedding cake for Lindsay and Melanie on short notice. Vic responds by channeling his anger into accomplishing the task. When Justin questions Debbie about this, she explains that she used a similar strategy to get Vic to fight to stay alive: "I just kept screaming at him, 'So fucking die already!'"

During the third season, Emmett hires Vic to assist him with his event planning business. Vic meets Rodney, and they begin to develop a relationship. During the fourth season, Vic moves out of Debbie's house to live with Rodney. Debbie, mad at not being invited to a dinner party, gets into a huge argument with him. The following morning, Michael comes to visit Vic and finds he has died of a heart attack due to complications from his HIV medications. His death leaves Debbie feeling extremely guilty. She goes so far as to throw a Christmas party for him in February. Eventually, she realizes that Vic would not want her to live her life this way, and with some help from Detective Horvath, moves on.

Meanwhile, Vic appears in Brian's dreams, especially after Brian learns he has testicular cancer. Vic explains Brian's options to him. He can survive his health crisis and die "an old queen" just as Vic had. Or he can die young and get into a heaven with plenty of good-looking gay men. Once Brian's intensive radiation treatments succeed, Vic stops appearing in his dreams and in the series altogether.

== Emmett Honeycutt ==
Emmett Honeycutt
- First appearance: Season 1, Episode 1
- Last appearance: Season 5, Episode 13
- Created by: Ron Cowen; Daniel Lipman
- Portrayed by: Peter Paige
- UK counterpart: Alexander Perry (Antony Cotton)

In-universe information
- Nickname: Em
- Occupation: Shop clerk at Torso; Waiter (former); Housekeeper; Porn star (Ted's website); Event planner "Queer Guy" correspondent
- Family: 6 brothers & sisters
- Significant others: Theodore "Ted" Schmidt (ex-boyfriend); George Schickle (ex-boyfriend; deceased); Drew Boyd (ex-boyfriend); Calvin Colpepper (boyfriend [series finale])

Emmett Honeycutt is notable for his wry witticisms and flamboyant fashion sense. He has a wide variety of jobs throughout the series: working in a clothing store, becoming a porn star for Ted's website, running his own catering business, and delivering television news segments as the "Queer Guy."

He is best friends with Ted Schmidt, with whom he becomes romantically involved later in the series. The relationship is short-lived, however, as Ted faces serious problems with drug addiction that place enormous strain on him and Emmett.

Through Ted's website, he gains an admirer in George Schickle, a wealthy old man who owns a pickle company. They fall in love despite their significant age difference, but George suffers a heart attack and dies on the eve of a six-month tour of the world with Emmett. Emmett is shocked and touched when he learns that George has left him a significant amount of money, but is heartbroken to find out that he can only claim it if he publicly denies his affair with George. Emmett gives up the money because he wants the world to know how much he truly loved George.

On a catering gig, he meets Pittsburgh Ironmen quarterback Drew Boyd. After Drew makes some homophobic remarks to his friends, Emmett confronts him. When Emmett drops by Drew's house to pick up his paycheck, Drew becomes aggressively flirtatious and he and Emmett have sex on the floor. Although Drew is engaged to a woman, he and Emmett begin an on-again/off-again relationship that continues even after Drew marries. When his wife discovers a different male affair that Boyd has had, she leaves him, and Drew turns to Emmett for solace. He comes out to the public by sharing a controversial on-air kiss with Emmett, causing each of them to lose their jobs. Their relationship ends bittersweetly when Emmett sees him kissing another man and concedes that, as a man newly out of the closet, Drew needs the time and freedom to sow his oats.

Although at first glance Emmett seems to be a gay stereotype, even a stock character, throughout the five seasons his character becomes quite dynamic and complex. This complexity is enhanced by frequent anecdotes concerning his childhood in Hazlehurst, Mississippi and other references that hint at the challenges he has overcome. It is implied that he is estranged from his family.

== Carl Horvath ==
Carl Horvath
- First appearance: Season 2, Episode 10
- Last appearance: Season 5, Episode 13
- Created by: Ron Cowen; Daniel Lipman
- Portrayed by: Peter MacNeill
- UK counterpart: PC Stroud (seen only in last episode)

In-universe information
- Title: Detective Carl Horvath
- Occupation: Police detective
- Spouses: Celia Horvath (wife; deceased)
- Significant others: Deborah "Debbie" Novotny (domestic partner)
- Children: Carl Horvath, Jr. (son, with Celia); Vicki (daughter, with Celia)

Detective Carl Horvath first appears in season two and remains through season five as a supporting character.

Carl first appears in season two as an investigating police officer when Debbie finds the body of a young gay hustler in a dumpster behind the Liberty Diner. He makes a homophobic comment to another officer ("Looks like we got a Jane Doe") which Debbie overhears, and she immediately berates Carl for his disrespect. Because of this, and also the slow police response to the investigation of the murder, Debbie initially dislikes Carl. With Vic and Jennifer's help, Debbie finds out the young man's name was Jason Kemp, and she gives this information to Carl. Debbie is surprised when, soon after, Carl shows up at Debbie's house and tells her the background information he was able to learn after Debbie's tip. However, it is not until season three that the murder of Jason Kemp is resolved, since it involved corruption within the police department and the former partner of Police Chief Jim Stockwell, who ran for Mayor during that season.

Carl asks Debbie out on a date after her assistance with the investigation in season two, and she reluctantly agrees. While eating seafood and showing each other pictures, it is revealed that Carl is a widower and has two children, a son and a daughter. His son is in the Air Force and is stationed in Germany, and he has "a couple of little ones," making Carl a grandfather. His daughter is married to an African-American lawyer and lives in Utah, so Carl and Debbie bond a bit over the fact that they have to allow their children to be who they are. Carl's relationship with Debbie soon becomes sexual, with Emmett and Ted instructing Debbie on how to please Carl in bed. Carl mistakes Debbie for a "professional," which hurts Debbie's feelings at first, until Emmett and Ted reveal their role in assisting Debbie. Carl further makes it up to Debbie by learning some lessons from two of the lesbians on the force. Carl and Debbie's relationship becomes strained during the third season, when Carl feels he has to back Chief Stockwell in the mayoral election or risk reprisal from the police force, while Debbie strongly supports the implied Democrat, Councilman Deekins.

By the later seasons, Debbie and Carl resume their relationship, and Carl eventually asks Debbie to marry him. Although Debbie accepts his proposal, she becomes upset that her son Michael cannot marry his partner Ben, so Debbie and Carl decide to live as a common-law couple.

== Callie Leeson ==
Callie Leeson
- First appearance: Season 4, Episode 11
- Last appearance: Season 5, Episode 6
- Created by: Ron Cowen; Daniel Lipman
- Portrayed by: Meredith Henderson
- UK counterpart: None

In-universe information
- Occupation: High School Student
- Family: Amber Morgan Leeson (mother); Steve Leeson (father)
- Significant others: Hunter Montgomery (ex-boyfriend)

Callie Leeson is a high school student and Hunter's romantic interest through part of season 4. Callie and Hunter meet when Hunter joins the school's swim team. The two begin dating, but Hunter is nervous and hesitant about revealing the relationship to Michael and Ben who still assume Hunter is gay. When Hunter does tell Ben and Michael the truth, the two are initially surprised but express their support nonetheless.

Hunter is forced to admit to Callie that he's HIV positive prior to the two engaging in sex. However, Callie appears non-perturbed and calmly advises him to use a condom. Callie's parents, while initially supportive of the relationship, are shocked to learn of Hunter's HIV status when they read Callie's diary. Having previously arranged to meet Ben and Michael for a cordial dinner, Callie's parents instead use the opportunity to confront Ben and Michael with their discovery and forbid the relationship to continue. The Leesons further demand to know how Hunter contracted HIV. Ben and Michael refuse to answer, but Hunter, overhearing the conversation, angrily reveals his history as a prostitute. This revelation shocks Callie enough to break off the relationship herself the next day at school.

Although no longer dating Hunter, Callie remains supportive and sympathetic and even stands up for Hunter when he is bullied at school after his HIV status is leaked to the student body. She further denounces her parents' hypocrisy after they and other concerned parents try to pressure Hunter into withdrawing from school. Hunter misinterprets Callie's support as an invitation to resume their relationship and is dismayed when he learns that Callie has started seeing someone else. The pain and regret of losing Callie contributes to Hunter's decision to leave Pittsburgh.

== Melanie Marcus ==
Melanie Marcus
- First appearance: Season 1, Episode 1
- Last appearance: Season 5, Episode 13
- Created by: Ron Cowen; Daniel Lipman
- Portrayed by: Michelle Clunie
- UK counterpart: Lisa Levene (Saira Todd)

In-universe information
- Aliases: Melanie Rachel Marcus (full name)
- Nickname: Mel
- Occupation: Attorney/lawyer
- Spouse: Lindsay Peterson (wife)
- Significant other: Leda (ex-girlfriend)
- Children: Gus Peterson-Marcus (adoptive son, with Lindsay); Jenny Rebecca Novotny-Marcus (daughter, with Lindsay [and Michael])
- Relatives: Rita (cousin)

Melanie Rachel Marcus is one of the main characters and the domestic partner of Lindsay Peterson. Melanie is also the biological mother of Jenny Rebecca, a daughter by way of artificial insemination from mutual friend Michael Novotny, and the adoptive mother of Gus, Lindsay's natural son by way of artificial insemination from Lindsay's longtime friend Brian Kinney.

Melanie is an attorney with a successful law firm, and from her numerous references to "the other partners" she is taken to be a partner as well. (A sign outside of her workplace lists her as a partner at Kurtzman, Vasquez, Kurshira & Marcus in season 1 episode 21; in season 4, however, her partner in the firm is Larry Jacobs.) She was raised Jewish and insists that Jewish traditions be observed in her family life, but does not seem to have an active spiritual life and may consider herself Jewish in a strictly cultural sense. At the beginning of the series, she and Lindsey have been together for five years. Throughout the relationship Brian Kinney has been a source of stress and discord for the couple, but Melanie allows him to remain an active presence in their lives because of his longtime friendship with Lindsay. Melanie's negative feelings about Brian are only exacerbated as he repeatedly injects himself into decisions about Gus' upbringing and reneges on his promise to sign his parental rights over to Melanie.

During the first two seasons, Melanie permits Lindsay take the year following Gus' birth on leave. The strain of being the family's sole breadwinner causes her to feel some resentment towards Lindsay. During this period of instability in the relationship, Melanie has a one-night stand with a woman she meets at a friend's baby shower. After disclosing the affair to Lindsay, she moves in with her cousin Rita for several months. The couple reconciles when, on the condition that they get back together and be loving parents to his son, Brian agrees to sign his parental rights over to Melanie.

In the season two premiere, Lindsay proposes marriage. Knowing that the union will not be legal and insisting that they do not need a piece of paper to validate their relationship, Melanie initially declines. However, she later relents and the two are married in a surprise ceremony thrown together by friends and family.

Melanie is also close friends with Ted Schmidt, an accountant that manages Lindsay and Melanie's financial portfolio. This relationship is solid until the revelation that Ted stole money from Gus' college fund. Eventually Ted admits his wrongdoings and is grudgingly forgiven by Melanie and Lindsay.

In season three, Melanie admits that she is unable to have children due to endometriosis. After having an operation to restore her fertility, she asks Michael to be the donor father. Michael is hurt when Melanie, remembering her struggles with Brian, creates a contract absolving Michael of his parental rights. Melanie eventually relents and lets Michael share parental rights.

While Melanie is pregnant with Jenny Rebecca, she discovers that Lindsay has had an affair with a male artist, Sam Auerbach, whose work is being featured at her gallery. Melanie is furious, especially since Lindsay cheated with a man, and terminates their relationship. The pair have an acrimonious relationship after that, eventually descending into a custody battle over Jenny Rebecca, which Michael gets involved with as well.

In the final season, after a bomb explosion targeting a gay and lesbian convention takes the life of a fellow lesbian friend, Lindsay and Melanie decide to reconcile for good. The couple's last appearance on the show reveals that they have decided to move to Toronto, Ontario, Canada to avoid further government and personal persecution for being a homosexual couple.

== James "Hunter" Novotny-Bruckner ==
Hunter Novotny-Bruckner
- First appearance: Season 3, Episode 8
- Last appearance: Season 5, Episode 13
- Created by: Ron Cowen; Daniel Lipman
- Portrayed by: Harris Allan

In-universe information
- Aliases: James Montgomery (birth name)
- Nickname: Jimmy (by mother)
- Occupation: High school student Male prostitute (former)
- Family: Michael Novotny (adoptive father); Benjamin "Ben" Bruckner (adoptive father); Rita Montgomery (biological mother; estranged); Jenny Rebecca Novotny-Marcus (adoptive half-sister); Deborah "Debbie" Novotny (adoptive grandmother)
- Significant others: Callie Leeson (ex-girlfriend)

Hunter Novotny-Bruckner (born James "Hunter" Montgomery), 15 years old (first appearance), is the adopted son of Michael Novotny and Ben Bruckner. While Michael and Ben have just begun living together, Chief Jim Stockwell's recent "cleanup" of Liberty Avenue forces gay prostitutes to solicit in front of their building. Hunter is one of the boys seen by Ben when he initially tries to disperse them off the premises. After several more encounters, Ben allows Hunter to spend the night, and later gives him some money and his phone number. When Hunter ends up in the hospital he puts Ben down as his family member to contact. Ben pretends, reluctantly, to be Hunter's "uncle" and is forced to pay his large hospital bill. Ben is then told that Hunter himself is also HIV positive and takes it upon himself to tell him. Eventually, Hunter starts living with Michael and Ben, but the arrangement is rocky at first as Hunter blatantly disregards the rules and limits the couple laid out for him. Hunter later overhears a conversation between Ben and Michael where they sadly admit that Hunter might be a lost cause and that they should let him go if he's unhappy with them. Ashamed, Hunter begins to make a more sincere effort to adapt to his new home by respecting curfew and enrolling in school. Michael is initially less patient with Hunter's presence in the home, though he eventually comes around as Hunter seems to have equal interests in comic books.

Towards the end of the third season, Rita, Hunter's mother, appears. She claims that she had given him up for adoption due to a tumultuous marriage and for fear that she wouldn't have been able to raise her son on her low income. Seemingly grateful for the care that Michael and Ben have shown her son, she relays her intent to bring him home and start over. However, Hunter accuses his mother of forcing him to commit acts of prostitution from an early age and refuses to leave with her. When Rita summons the police to remove Hunter from Michael's and Ben's custody, Michael flees Pittsburgh with Hunter leaving Ben to stall the authorities. Michael and Hunter return to Pittsburgh in time for the custody trial with Melanie hired to represent Hunter. Rita does win custody initially, but the judge overhears her callous and homophobic remarks regarding Hunter's HIV status and awards custody to Ben and Michael.

During the fourth season, it is revealed that Hunter is in a heterosexual relationship with a girl, Callie Leeson. At first Michael is upset by the idea of a heterosexual son, but he learns to accept it, even agreeing to have dinner with Callie's parents. However, Callie's parents confront Michael and Ben once learning Hunter is HIV positive after reading in Callie's diary. Insisting they are acting in the interest of protecting Callie, they forbid the relationship to continue. Hurt and angry, Hunter reveals his history as a prostitute which further disturbs the Leesons and shocks Callie enough for her to break off the relationship herself.

During season five, Callie's parents expose Hunter's HIV status to the school at-large during a swim meet when he accidentally cuts his forehead and bleeds into the water, which makes Hunter a target for bullying and hatred at school. This culminates in the school's principal calling a meeting for the concerned parents in an effort to disarm them. Amid pressure to withdraw from school, Hunter is able to take a stand against the accusations leveled against him by the parents at the meeting and resolves to stay in his high school. However, he soon finds out that Callie has a new boyfriend and is extremely upset by this. He also feels slightly pushed aside because of the arrival of JR which further divides Michael's and Ben's attention. Feeling isolated, he decides to leave Pittsburgh much to the shock and dismay of Michael and Ben. While Michael attempts to be more stoic, Ben is particularly devastated over Hunter's abrupt departure and becomes moody and irritable. Finally, the couple receives an E-mail from Hunter, telling them that he is OK, which seems to ease their sadness.

After Michael is severely injured in the bombing of Babylon, a worried Hunter returns home. After a chat with Debbie, he decides to stay for good. He reveals that he hitched to Disney World and got a job as one of Snow White's seven dwarfs. He gets a job at the diner, and further encouraged by Debbie, decides to go back to school. In his last scene, Hunter is working at the diner when Ben and Michael call him over and tell him he passed all his subjects. They then hand him a journal with the letters 'H.N.B' inscribed on it. Ben explains that they are his initials, Hunter Novotny-Bruckner, if he wants them to be. Writing in his diary, Hunter says: "Today Ben and Michael asked me to be their real son. I said yes." They all hug happily.

== Debbie Novotny ==
Debbie Novotny
- First appearance: Season 1, Episode 2
- Last appearance: Season 5, Episode 13
- Created by: Ron Cowen; Daniel Lipman
- Portrayed by: Sharon Gless
- UK counterpart: Hazel Tyler (Denise Black)

In-universe information
- Aliases: Deborah Jane Grassi (birth name); Deborah Jane Grassi Novotny (full name)
- Nicknames: Debbie, Deb
- Occupation: Waitress at the Liberty Diner
- Family: Victor "Vic" Grassi (younger brother; deceased); Hunter Novotny-Bruckner (adoptive grandson, via Michael); Jenny Rebecca Novotny-Marcus (granddaughter, via Michael)
- Significant others: Danny Devore (ex-boyfriend); Carl Horvath (domestic partner)
- Children: Michael Novotny (son, with Danny)
- Relatives: Benjamin "Ben" Bruckner (son-in-law, via Michael)

Deborah Jane Grassi "Debbie" Novotny (born Deborah Jane Grassi) is a supporting, loud heterosexual fictional character on the show. The mother (at 17) of main character Michael Novotny, Debbie plays a major role in her son's life, is a strong supporter of gay rights, and an active member of PFLAG. She is usually found either at her house or at the Liberty Diner, where she is a waitress. She also is known for her T-shirts, with such phrases as "Got Head?", "Bitch Goddess", and "Foreplay is for pussies" (to name a few) and her button-laden rainbow vest, the latter she wears when working. She is also seen wearing a bright-red wig, which she only is seen without twice (the first time she loses it because she fell unconscious and the wig falls off, the second time she talks with her brother in her bath robe and doesn't wear it).

During the second season, after discovering a dead male prostitute in the garbage bin behind the diner where she works, Debbie attempts to find out his name, actually beating the police force in discovering it. In this season, it was also discovered that her high-school sweetheart, Danny Devore, could be the father of Michael. They never married and she later took on the last name of Novotny after reading the name of a soldier who died in Vietnam. She also plays an important role in the campaign against Chief Jim Stockwell, the anti-gay police chief running for mayor of Pittsburgh. Her efforts appear to pay off, as he loses the election.

In the fourth season, her relationship with her brother Vic sours when he moves out. It is known that before the storyline began, Debbie nursed HIV-positive Vic back to health. She feels that he is not grateful for it. Soon after they have a big fight, Vic dies (of a heart attack), leaving her feeling very guilty. Eventually, she forgives herself.

At the end of the fourth season, Debbie's on-and-off boyfriend, Detective Carl Horvath, asks her to marry him, and she accepts. However, she later tells him she cannot marry him, not as long as Michael and Ben cannot legally marry in the US. So, they decide to live together for the remainder of the series.

In season 5 she gives up her job at the Diner, and trains a woman named Loretta Pye to take over from her. However, Loretta falls in love with her after she saves her from her abusive husband. Eventually Debbie tells Loretta that she is not a lesbian and Loretta leaves town. She then starts to feel very ill and sees that the Diner isn't coping well without her when she realises she is bored and misses her job. With the support of Carl she eventually goes back to waitressing at the Diner.

The character of Debbie Novotny is parodied in the teenage film Another Gay Movie, where the mother of one of the central characters (Nico, a flamboyant teenage boy) adopts Debbie's 'out there' style of clothing after Nico comes out to her. Note with every episode, Debbie has a different T-shirt, with a different saying on it.

== Michael Novotny ==
Michael Novotny
- First appearance: Season 1, Episode 1
- Last appearance: Season 5, Episode 13
- Created by: Ron Cowen; Daniel Lipman
- Portrayed by: Hal Sparks
- UK counterpart: Vince Tyler (Craig Kelly)

In-universe information
- Aliases: Michael Charles Novotny (birth name); Michael Charles Novotny-Bruckner (full name)
- Nickname: Mikey (by Brian)
- Occupation: Manager at The Big Q Store owner (Red Cape Comics); Comic book author (Rage)
- Family: Danny Devore (biological father); Deborah "Debbie" Novotny (mother); Victor "Vic" Grassi (maternal uncle; deceased)
- Spouse: Benjamin "Ben" Bruckner (husband)
- Significant others: David Cameron (ex-boyfriend)
- Children: Hunter Novotny-Bruckner (adopted son, with Ben); Jenny Rebecca Novotny-Marcus (daughter, with Melanie)

Michael Charles Novotny-Bruckner (né Novotny), portrayed by Hal Sparks, has a mother with whom he is very close, Debbie, played by Sharon Gless, and an uncle, Vic (Jack Wetherall), who is also gay. An episode's plot was dedicated to Michael discovering his roots, and how his mother changed her name to have him believe that his father was a soldier and hero who died in the Vietnam war. His actual father was Danny Devore, played by Gary Beach who became a drag queen entertainer named Divina Devore.

Michael is best friends with Brian Kinney (Gale Harold), with whom he has been friends since they were 14 years old. Since the show's debut, their lives have gone in extremely different directions. Michael settles down with his partner, Ben Bruckner, a university professor, and the two eventually adopt teenage son Hunter. Michael is also (as of the end of season 4) the father of baby daughter, JR (short for Jenny Rebecca), whose primary parents are lesbian couple Melanie Marcus and Lindsay Peterson (Michael donated the sperm for Melanie's pregnancy, but nevertheless remains an active father figure to the baby girl). Brian, on the other hand, has led a very hedonistic and promiscuous life, filled with drugs and sex.

At the start of the series, Michael works at a Walmart-like store, called the Big Q. He dates David, a chiropractor (played by Chris Potter). He moves to Portland, Oregon at the end of the first season with David, only to return after they break up. He quits his job at the Big Q and buys a comic book store, his passion. He meets Ben, struggles to come to terms with Ben's HIV, but they eventually work out their issues.

In the second season, Michael and Justin Taylor (Randy Harrison), whom Brian labels his boyfriend in a "non-defined, non-conventional sort of way," created a comic book character named Rage, a gay superhero comic whose title character is based on Brian. The comic was a success, but a movie version in season four was cancelled due to a fickle Hollywood.

He is often very defensive of his best friend, Brian, and admits to having some feelings for him. For example, when Justin and Brian split up, Michael tells Justin to get out of their lives. After Lindsay and Melanie break up at the beginning of the fifth season, Michael becomes upset that his and Melanie's daughter is being raised in a broken home and an ugly custody battle ensues. Eventually, the three parents resolve their issues.

Brian has accused Michael of being a conformist homosexual and bases this on Michael having a partner, a house, and an adopted son. While Michael feels that this was always what he wanted, Brian accuses him of being a traitor. This issue is an ongoing one in the gay community: some gay-rights activists complain that other gays are conforming to a heterosexual lifestyle (Such as adopting children and moving away from the gay friendly cities and into the more banal and conservative suburbs), thereby ignoring and rendering useless their plight against homophobia. Some have even accused them of being self-hating gays who wish they were straight.

In one of the final episodes, Michael is badly injured in a bomb explosion at the local gay nightclub, Babylon. He recovers (amongst great difficulty, as he was close to the bomb, which killed secondary lesbian character, Dusty, who was only a few feet away from him), and the series ends with him and Brian dancing in the burned out infrastructure of the building. However, as the camera tracks around them dancing, the destroyed club begins to transform to a restored Babylon, complete with people dancing and laser and strobe lights. The scene cuts to the outside of Babylon, showing the long queue of people waiting to get in. This shows that Brian changed his decision to not rebuild Babylon. The camera returns to Brian and Michael dancing, while he narrates (similarly to his narration at the opening of the series): So the "thumpa thumpa" continues. It always will. No matter what happens. No matter who's president. As our lady of Disco, the divine Miss Gloria Gaynor has always sung to us: We will survive.

== Lindsay Peterson ==
Lindsay Peterson
- First appearance: Season 1, Episode 1
- Last appearance: Season 5, Episode 13
- Created by: Ron Cowen; Daniel Lipman
- Portrayed by: Thea Gill
- UK counterpart: Romey Sullivan (Esther Hall)

In-universe information
- Nickname: Linz/Linds (by everyone)
- Occupation: Art professor Art dealer
- Family: Ron Peterson (father; estranged); Nancy Peterson (mother; estranged); Lynette (sister; estranged); Grannie Faye (Maternal grandmother; deceased)
- Spouse: Melanie Marcus (wife)
- Children: Gus Peterson-Marcus (son, with Melanie [and Brian]); Jenny Rebecca Novotny-Marcus (step-daughter, via Melanie)

Lindsay Peterson is one of the main characters and is the domestic partner (and later wife) of Melanie Marcus. Lindsay is also the biological mother of Gus, a son by way of artificial insemination from donor and longtime friend Brian Kinney, and the adoptive mother of Jenny Rebecca, Melanie's natural child by way of artificial insemination from donor and mutual friend Michael Novotny. Lindsay has a strained relationship with her mother and sister, who have never truly accepted her orientation. Although Mel is welcome at family events, both she and Lindsay are expected to bring male dates if people outside the family will be in attendance (such as Lindsay's sister's wedding)

Gus' parentage has been a source of contention between Lindsay, Melanie and Brian. While Brian initially gives up his parental rights over Gus, he later tries to become a more prominent father figure in Gus' life, much to the chagrin of Melanie.

Lindsay and Melanie act through most of the series as the stable lesbian couple. Lindsay, in particular, helps Justin Taylor (Brian's lovelorn lover) in his pursuit of a career in art and has taken him into her care from time to time.

Lindsay became an art curator at a gallery when she returned to work a year after giving birth to Gus. There she meets (male) fellow artist Sam, with whom Lindsay has an affair during the fourth season. This causes the two women to separate. Lindsay moves out of the house and in to a small apartment with Gus, although for a brief time, they live with Lindsay's parents. This brief reconciliation is brought to an end when her mother tries to fix her up with a man; Lindsay tells her mother that in spite of her infidelity, she is still a lesbian, and that's something about her that will never change. Later on, Lindsay is the first to realize that the three-way custody battle between herself, Mel, and Michael is ruining Jenny Rebecca's life, and recuses herself from it for the sake of her daughter.

At the end of the series, after a bomb explosion targeting a gay and lesbian convention takes the life of a fellow lesbian friend Dusty, Lindsay and Melanie decide to reconcile permanently. Lindsay and Melanie's last appearance on the show reveals that they have decided to move to Toronto, Ontario, Canada to avoid further government and personal persecution for being a homosexual couple. Although Michael gives them his blessing, Lindsay must spend her final days in Pittsburgh convincing Brian that letting Gus go is the right thing to do.

== Ted Schmidt ==
Theodore "Ted" Schmidt begins the series as a bright accountant with an MBA from the Wharton School of Business at the University of Pennsylvania. Ted is a few years older than his friends and was portrayed as having difficulty in finding sexual partners or building a romantic relationship. His earliest attempt, with a younger man named Blake, ends with Ted in a coma from an overdose of GHB. After recovering he meets Blake again and they start a relationship. Blake is still using substances and Ted checks him into rehab, but Blake disappears.

== Jim Stockwell ==
Jim Stockwell
- First appearance: Season 3, Episode 5
- Last appearance: Season 3, Episode 14
- Created by: Ron Cowen; Daniel Lipman
- Portrayed by: David Gianopoulos
- UK counterpart: None

In-universe information
- Title: Chief of Police
- Occupation: Chief of police Mayoral candidate (Pittsburgh)

Jim Stockwell, the chief of police for the Pittsburgh Police Force and is part of one of the major story arcs of the third season of the series.

The position for Mayor has become available, and Jim Stockwell is the Republican candidate (a red R next to his name on a TV screen during election night in the season finale is the only clear evidence to his actual party allegiance). Stockwell was originally behind in the polls, but after Brian Kinney became his campaign manager, he was winning the race.

Stockwell is homophobic, and many characters, namely Debbie Novotny, are very vocal in their opposition to him, and this leads to many conflicts with Brian supporting his candidacy. In fact, at one point in the series, Stockwell closes all the bars, clubs and bathhouses on Liberty Avenue except for Club Babylon, and there the infamous back room has been closed.

Stockwell fires Brian when he finds out that he is gay (one of his officers recognized him during a bust at the bar Woody's), but later re-hires him when he begins slipping in the polls once more.

Brian and his partner Justin Taylor are secretly working together on a smear campaign against Stockwell by posting negative flyers around Pittsburgh. Stockwell catches Kinney in his apartment with the flyers, and he is fired by both Stockwell and his advertising firm, Vanguard. Justin and Brian then find out that a young gay man named Jason Kemp who had been found dead in a dumpster early on in the series (frequently referred to as "Dumpster Boy") had been murdered by a cop Kenneth Rykert, Jim's former partner on the force. Stockwell conspired to keep this a secret by having Rykert retire from the force. Thanks to Hunter sleeping with him and snatching the condom Rykert wore during sex, Brian was able to confront him at a sleazy gay bar with the evidence and threaten to expose him and Stockwell. Before Rykert could be brought in for questioning for his connection to the murder of Jason Kemp by Carl Horvath, he was found in his home's garage with a self-inflicted gunshot wound to the head.

Using all the money he has (and maxing out several credit cards), Kinney runs a series of ad campaigns highlighting Stockwell's corruption, causing the Liberty Avenue area to come out in droves on Election night and narrowly defeat Stockwell.

In the fourth season, Lindsay Peterson mentions that Stockwell had been indicted for his part in the cover-up.

== Jennifer Taylor ==
Jennifer Taylor
- First appearance: Season 1, Episode 2
- Last appearance: Season 5, Episode 13
- Created by: Ron Cowen; Daniel Lipman
- Portrayed by: Sherry Miller
- UK counterpart: Janice Maloney (Caroline O'Neill)

In-universe information
- Occupation: Real estate broker
- Spouse: Craig Taylor (ex-husband)
- Significant other: Tucker (boyfriend)
- Children: Justin Taylor (son, with Craig); Molly Taylor (daughter, with Craig)

Jennifer Taylor is Justin's mother. In the first season, she suspects that Justin is gay after she sees some drawings in his sketchbook and a man's jockstrap in his room. When she confronts him about it the first time, he runs away, not knowing what to do. She takes him to see a therapist thinking that he is just confused, that he doesn't know what he wants yet. At first, she doesn't tell her husband that her son is gay. She and Justin go to an art exhibit so that they can mend their relationship. Instead, he takes this chance to have a quickie in the men's room, much to her dismay and sadness. She is invited to Justin's first art exhibit where she sees some erotic art pieces by Justin. When she sees Brian holding Justin in a suggestive way and kissing him, she realizes that he is the naked, sleeping man in one of Justin's drawings and that he has been sleeping with her son. She tells her husband Craig that their son is gay after she sees that an older man is the one who seduced him. During the rest of the season, she comes to terms with her son's homosexuality, with the help of Debbie Novotny. She ultimately divorces Craig.

At the beginning of the second season, she forbids Brian to see Justin after the attack because she thinks that he is indirectly responsible for her son's attack. After she is not able to control or touch Justin, she asks Brian to take him in since he is the only one whom Justin trusts. She becomes involved in PFLAG and is more involved in Justin's life. By the middle of the season, she is a real-estate agent and has come to accept Brian more and turns to him for extra support when trying to get something through to her son, like finding friends his own age.

She helps Ted and Emmett find a house so that they can live together. She lists Brian's loft for sale, several times. She also helps him find a building for his new headquarters for Kinnetik, an abandoned bath house. By the last season, she finally accepts Brian and tells him that she would be proud to have him as a son-in-law. She has a much younger boyfriend, "Tucker", of whom Justin does not approve. In one of her final appearance in the series, she visits Justin in his apartment and "dances" with him; this is a symbolic gesture of her acceptance of him and of his relations with other men (Justin, in turn, indicates that he has come to terms with his mother's younger boyfriend); the character is last seen in the final episode waiting for Brian and Justin to appear at their rehearsal dinner.

== Blake Wyzecki ==
Blake Wyzecki
- First appearance: Season 1, Episode 3
- Last appearance: Season 5, Episode 13
- Created by: Ron Cowen; Daniel Lipman
- Portrayed by: Dean Armstrong
- UK counterpart: Similar to Harvey Black (Andrew Lancel)

In-universe information
- Occupation: Drug abuse counselor
- Significant other: Ted Schmidt (boyfriend)

Blake Wyzecki makes his first appearance in season one, when he is flirting with Ted Schmidt. Ted takes him home, and Blake gets him to try GHB, with disastrous results. Ted falls into a coma and Blake runs out. Ted later finds out that Blake called for an ambulance after he fled.

Toward the end of the first season, Ted sees Blake again at Club Babylon, clearly "tweaked out". Ted takes him to the hospital, and tries to get him rehabilitated. In fact, Melanie Marcus goes as far to give Blake a position at her law firm, though he gets fired for not showing up, as it is clear he is still using crystal meth. Ted checks him into a rehab center, but when he comes to check up on him the next day, Blake has checked himself out.

Blake does not reappear in the series until season three, when Ted hits rock-bottom and ends up at the same rehabilitation center he checked Blake into two years prior. Blake, now sober, is a counselor there, and helps Ted to overcome his serious addiction. Ted tries to start up a relationship with him, but after a one-night stand, Blake breaks it off, because he feels he is a hindrance on Ted's road to recovery.

During the final season, Blake and Ted reunite, and end up as a couple.
