= Ted Schmidt =

Fictional character

- Queer as Folk character
- Scott Lowell as Ted Schmidt
- First appearance: December 3, 2000
- Last appearance: August 7, 2005
- Portrayed by: Scott Lowell
- UK counterpart: Phil Delaney (Jason Merrells)

In-universe information
- Occupation: Accountant; Businessman

Theodore Schmidt is a fictional character from the American Showtime television drama series Queer as Folk, played by Scott Lowell. Fellow show cast member Peter Paige, who plays Emmett Honeycutt originally auditioned for the role. Lowell was cast and he stated that he had an instant connection with the character. Queer as Folk is based on the British show of the same name and Ted is loosely based on the character Phil Delaney, played by Jason Merrells. Phil was killed off in that series, whereas show creator Daniel Lipman decided to develop the character into a full-time role for the US version.

Ted is portrayed as a gay man uncomfortable with his thirty-something age. He wants to date younger men in their twenties and who are considered inappropriate. This was demonstrated as Ted became involved with the drug addicted Blake Wyzecki (Dean Armstrong). Ted takes it upon himself to save Blake from addiction but fails. The show developed an on-screen partnership between Lowell and Paige's Ted and Emmett. The duo were played as best friends who later start a romance.

The character's main storylines have been self-confidence issues, having plastic surgery and a drug addiction to crystal meth. Lowell worked with a medical consultant to create an accurate portrayal of a descent into drug addiction. The actor has praised the story for showing how men with low self-esteem, like Ted, are prone to addiction. The character has been generally well received by television critics, though some have criticized his long-suffering persona.

== Creation and casting ==
Various acting agencies did not send their clients to audition for roles in the show because of potential controversy. Lowell told Michael Idato from The Sydney Morning Herald that it helped him and other colleagues lacking television experience win the roles. In the original scripts Ted was described as "chubby and balding". Lowell did not resemble Ted but his first scene depicts him at a bar being ignored by "pretty, buffed club patrons". The actor had similar experiences and stated that while he was not a physical match he understood him psychologically.

Ted was the only character that Lowell auditioned for. He has also claimed it was the only role on the show he wanted. Lowell recalled reading the scripts for the pilot episode and really relating to the character. He understood and sympathised with the character. Peter Paige who plays Emmett Honeycutt on the show originally auditioned for the role of Ted. Casting directors were impressed with Paige's performance and invited him for a callback as Ted. But Emmett had also gained Paige's attention and he asked Linda Lowy if he could read for the part. She told Paige to choose which role he wanted. But Queer as Folk creators Daniel Lipman and Ron Cowen then watched him read for both Ted and Emmett. Paige decided he felt more comfortable playing Emmett. The show's production chose Lowell, who was different than their original description. They had not decided on what they wanted Ted to be until they met Lowell.

The show's creator Lipman stated that Lowell would not disclose his sexuality during the first season. He explained that Lowell, who is heterosexual, would not disclose the information because he did not want to detract from the series.

== Development ==
=== Characterisation ===
Queer as Folk is based on the British show of the same name and Ted is loosely based on the character Phil Delaney (Jason Merrells), who dies. Daniel Lipman helped to develop the US version and decided that unlike the British version Ted would not be killed off. Lipman wanted to keep the character because he envisaged Ted as a "restoration comedy character". Early in the first season, various stories mimicked the British storylines, but as it progressed they departed from the themes. Lowell has stated that during the second season the entire cast became an ensemble instead of Ted and other characters supporting the storyline between Brian Kinney (Gale Harold), Justin Taylor (Randy Harrison) and Michael Novotny (Hal Sparks).

Ted's story begins as a 33-year-old gay male who wants to be with younger men who are inappropriate for him. Ted is characterised as insecure. A writer from LogoTV described Ted as a wallflower accountant. His worst characteristic is his lusting for aged 20-something characters who do not return his romantic interest.

Lowell told Misha Davenport from the Chicago Sun-Times that Ted loved opera music and applies the same sense of romance to his sex life. Lowell focused to make the sex as realistic as possible. But he sometimes found it difficult with crew surrounding him and on one occasion the bed broke. Lowell has stated that he is not too similar to Ted. He could equate to Ted's sensible nature but not his highly conservative manner. He later spoke of how he understood Ted's psyche, his admiration for Ted's dry humor and good heart. He could sympathise with the character's plight because of personal experience. He believes that this gave him "magical creative connections" to portray Ted in a manner that no other actor could. He added "Its not necessarily the best way, just unique to my vision." Lowell told Leela Ginelle from PQ Monthly that people found it easy to relate to Ted because he has something very universal and lovable about him. More specifically, Lowell added it was "his search to learn to love himself before he was ready to truly love and be loved by someone else." The actor told a reporter from The Advocate that Ted has a high level of self-loathing.

=== Relationships ===
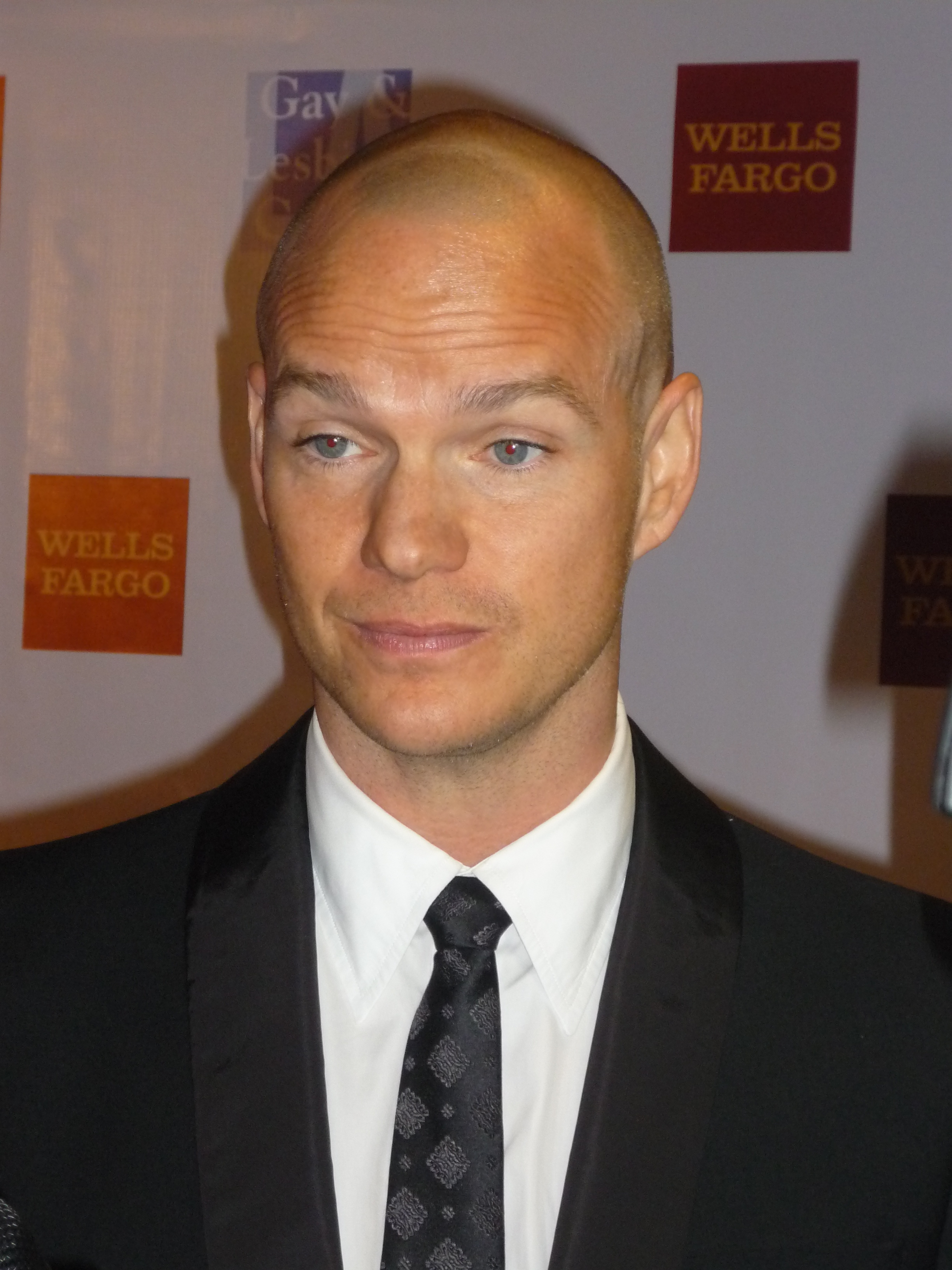
Peter Paige plays Ted's best friend and eventual love interest, Emmett Honeycutt

One of the character's main relationships was shared with Blake Wyzecki (Dean Armstrong). Their relationship ends following the first season of the show. Armstrong was rehired by the show at various times when writers revisited Ted and Blake's relationship. Ted first meets Blake at the Babylon night club but their first encounter ends in turmoil as Ted is hospitalised after taking drugs. Blake is a drug addict and Ted decides to help him and attempts to get him clean. The on-screen partnership was successful and well received by viewers. Armstrong told David R. Guarino from the Windy City Times that he and Lowell had instant chemistry on set and became good friends. He believed that this translated well on the show which fans connected with. Armstrong left the show following the first season of Queer as Folk. He felt disappointed that there was no closure to Ted and Blake's relationship.

Ted forms a close friendship with Emmett Honeycutt which has been both comedic and romantic. Lipman wanted both Ted and Emmett to be the show's "restoration comedy characters". Lowell told a reporter from Television Without Pity that the duo were initially "always on the sidelines snidely commenting on things going on around us, and kind of giving you more of an idea of what society was like at the time." Ted and Emmett often provide context on situations. Lowell added that his and Paige's casting benefited their character's friendship. The pair instantly became close friends and this encouraged producers to give Ted and Emmett friendship and comedy scenes. This led Lowell to believe that the writing had a "very slightly goofier edge to it".

Ted begins a relationship with Emmett and when questioned by Wenzel Jones from The Advocate, Paige said that gay male best friends becoming boyfriends was realistic. Lowell told The Advocate's Michael Rowe that Ted and Emmett are "the new Odd Couple". He believed that the pair "represent opposite yet inseparable ends of the gay spectrum."

=== Drug addiction ===
Producers planned a drug addiction storyline for the character. Lowell worked with a medical consultant to create an accurate portrayal of a descent into drug addiction. Lowell told Roger Catlin from the Hartford Courant that everyone least expected Ted to suffer a drug addiction. He viewed it a misconception because gay men like Ted are prone to addiction due to low self-esteem and no "street smarts to realize what's going on in their life". Writers decided that Ted enters rehab to begin a slow recovery, which Lowell believed to be the realistic approach. He bemoaned other shows for depicting recovery during a single episode, explaining that Ted's addiction is a "much more complicated situation". Ted learns to identify the triggers of his addiction and remove them; but he realizes that his community and friends are also triggers. The actor questioned: "how does he re-enter society and the community he knew with all these entanglements?" Writers continued to develop the character's addiction story and in one episode Ted participates in a pornographic film while high and later has no recollection of the event.

In a development that Lowell thought was "brilliant"; Ted attends his rehab support group and discovers that Blake is his counsellor. He explained that "Ted is an addictive personality and, in a lot of ways, he is addicted to fixing people. In the first season he had Blake, this cute blond toy boy if only he could just fix him up. It was like wounded-bird syndrome, but the truth is you can never fix anybody up, and it was an intriguing notion to have them reverse roles like that." Armstrong said that Blake had a lot of new-found responsibilities working as a drugs counsellor. He believed the biggest failure Blake could make was being unable to separate his professional and personal life. He explained that his character loved Ted and needed to ensure his counselling skills helped Ted to overcome his addiction.

When Ted completes his rehab programme he returns home but finds it difficult to reconnect with his friends. His relationship with Emmett is the most difficult because he remains too angry to deal with Ted. Emmett moves out of their home and refuses to support him.

=== Plastic surgery ===
As Amy Amatangelo from the Boston Herald noted, Ted "is in the midst of a midlife crisis complete with a pudgy stomach, thinning hair and young guys who insist on calling him sir." Lowell was informed of the storyline in advance. He was told to change his diet to gain weight so that he could lose it again and make Ted's liposuction appear effective. Lowell increased his carbohydrate intake but only gained five pounds. The actor learned that writers wanted him to appear naked in the episode following surgery. He knew there was not enough time for him to lose the gained weight and achieve the tightened physic the character needed. Production purchased him a fat suit to wear to make Ted appear bigger prior to surgery. Lowell visited a dentist who made a device for him to place in his mouth to expand his cheeks. This would make his cheeks appear different after use of the device ceased. Lowell was unhappy with the props and believed they did not work and looked embarrassing.

== Reception ==
"Ted, being the only main character over the age of thirty at the beginning of the show, is referred to as "dead man walking", constructed as the least sexually desirable of the four, constantly jealous of Brian's sexual conquests, secretly pining over youthful men, and living his life in a self effacing state of rejection."

— Author Dustin Bradley Goltz analyzes the character in his book, "Queer Temporalities in Gay Male Representation: Tragedy, Normativity, and Futurity".

Mike Pearson from the Rocky Mountain News said that Ted is an "aforementioned mild-mannered accountant". Steve Johnson and Sid Smith writing for the Chicago Tribune named Ted "the repressed, self-loathing accountant" and "a sad-sack accountant with a lot invested in his career". The Multichannel News's Linda Haugsted opined that Ted "wants a stable relationship but can't face the fact he may be too old to attract the hattie of his dreams." All of the show's characters irritated The Washington Post critic Tom Shales, especially Ted because he is a "the mealy-mouthed little mole". He also branded him "honest, decent, intelligent and sexless". Shales felt that Ted deserved to suffer, adding "Lowell gives such a mousy, mealy-mouthed performance that it's hard to feel any sympathy for poor sad Ted. He conveys emotions with all the subtlety of a circus parade, his eyeballs sometimes darting about wildly like the dots in one of those early video pong games." Ted Cox of the Daily Herald said that he is "the mousy accountant who is afraid of contact and favors, instead, gay porn". A reporter from the Associated Press believed that Ted's "sweet gloominess nicely complements Michael's wry sparkle".

The Age's critics Debi Enker, Nicole Brady, Paul Kalina and Brian Courtis have collectively branded Ted the smart, lonely, poor, sweet, porn-obsessed accountant. In 2004, The Sydney Morning Herald's Idato said that Ted had "evolved dramatically from the shy, uncertain geek". He opined that Ted and Blake's reunion in rehab was heartbreaking because of the actor's "incredible performances". The writer added that Lowell has "demonstrated incredible range playing the likeable Ted Schmidt through some fairly harrowing situations." He concluded that Ted's story was courageous, going on an "extraordinary journey from pious pal to addict Blake Wyzecki to an addict himself". Kim Potts from AOL stated that Ted is "Cynical, self-doubting, smart [and] successful". Michael Rowe of The Advocate branded the character "Emmett's emotionally repressed sidekick". Ed Gonzalez of Slant Magazine criticized Ted starting an adult entertainment website and having drugged up group sex. They responded that "you can't make this shit up, and it's all as ridiculous as it sounds."
