= An Early Frost =

- DVD cover
- Genre: Drama
- Teleplay by: Ron Cowen; Daniel Lipman
- Story by: Sherman Yellen
- Directed by: John Erman
- Starring: Aidan Quinn; Gena Rowlands; Ben Gazzara; Sylvia Sidney; D. W. Moffett; John Glover
- Music by: John Kander
- Country of origin: United States
- Original language: English

Production
- Producer: Perry Lafferty
- Cinematography: Woody Omens
- Editor: Jerrold L. Ludwig
- Running time: 95 minutes
- Production company: NBC Productions

Original release
- Network: NBC
- Release: November 11, 1985

An Early Frost is a 1985 American drama television film directed by John Erman and written by Ron Cowen and Daniel Lipman, based on a story by Sherman Yellen. It was first broadcast on NBC on November 11, 1985. Aidan Quinn stars as Michael Pierson, a Chicago attorney who goes home to break the news to his parents, played by Gena Rowlands and Ben Gazzara, that he is gay and has AIDS. Sylvia Sidney, D. W. Moffett, and John Glover also star.

An Early Frost was the first major film with major motion picture stars broadcast on a major television network to deal with the topic of AIDS. It was viewed by 34 million households in its initial airing, the highest rated show of the night, even beating Monday Night Football. It received 14 Emmy nominations winning four awards, including Outstanding Writing in a Miniseries or a Special, a Peabody Award, as well as three Golden Globe nominations, including one for Sylvia Sidney, who won for Best Supporting Actress. It was a major breakthrough into mass culture, as it was the first time an American audience of that size saw a film about a gay man who had AIDS, which up until then was considered a gay disease.

== Plot ==
Michael Pierson, a successful lawyer, suffers a bad coughing jag at work and is rushed to the hospital. There he learns from a doctor that he has been exposed to HIV. At home, he receives another piece of disturbing news: his partner Peter confesses that he had sex outside the relationship because Michael is a workaholic and is living in the closet. Michael, in a rage, throws Peter out of the house. He then travels to his parents' home to inform them that he is gay and has AIDS.

Michael's father Nick is a lumber company owner, and mother Kate is a former concert pianist, housewife, and grandmother. The couple's daughter Susan is married and has a child. Nick reacts angrily to the news, while Kate attempts to adapt to the situation. Nick initially refuses to speak to Michael for a day before breaking silence by saying, "I never thought the day would come when you'd be in front of me and I wouldn't know who you are." Susan, who is pregnant, refuses to see Michael, saying that she "can't take that chance", and Nick explodes when Michael tries to kiss Kate. Kate remembers reading in a magazine article that HIV is not transmitted through casual contact and tries to get the rest of the family to accept Michael (Gena Rowlands also taped a public service announcement about HIV transmission). Michael eventually winds up in the hospital (after paramedics who are called to his parents' house refuse to transport him to the hospital) and meets a fellow patient named Victor, a flamboyant homosexual with AIDS. The film depicts Victor's death and shows a nurse throwing Victor's few possessions into a garbage bag because she fears that the items could be contaminated.

Afterwards, Michael returns home and discovers Peter came to visit, and the two quickly reconcile. Peter asks Michael to go back home with him, but Michael insists that he cannot. As he continues to struggle coping with his diagnosis, Michael attempts suicide by carbon monoxide poisoning, but is stopped by Nick. The two argue and Nick insists that Michael keep fighting. The film ends with Michael taking a taxi cab to the airport to fly back to Chicago, telling his parents he loves them before he goes.

== Cast ==
- Aidan Quinn as Michael Pierson
- Sylvia Sidney as Beatrice McKenna
- Ben Gazzara as Nick Pierson
- Gena Rowlands as Katherine Pierson
- Sydney Walsh as Susan Maracek
- Terry O'Quinn as Dr. Redding
- John Glover as Victor DiMato
- Bill Paxton as Bob Maracek
- D. W. Moffett as Peter Hilton
- Cheryl Anderson as Christine
- Christopher Bradley as Todd
- Sue Ann Gilfillan as Nurse Lincoln
- Don Hood as Dr. Gilbert
- Barbara Hey as Meredith
- Scott Jaeck as Phil

== Development ==
The teleplay for the film by Ron Cowen and Daniel Lipman spent two years in development and underwent at least thirteen rewrites before the Standards and Practices division at the network accepted it for airing.

== Reception and legacy ==
Tom Shales of The Washington Post called An Early Frost "the most important TV movie of the year."

The film was number one in the Nielsen ratings during the night it aired, garnering a 23.3 share and watched by 34 million people (the film outperformed a San Francisco 49ers-Denver Broncos game broadcast on ABC and a Cagney & Lacey episode on CBS). The film was nominated for 14 Emmy Awards and won four, including Outstanding Writing in a Movie or Miniseries for Cowen and Lipman for their teleplay. Gena Rowlands, Ben Gazzara, Aidan Quinn, Sylvia Sidney and John Glover were all nominated for their performances, as was John Erman for his direction. The film was nominated for the Golden Globe Award for Best Television Movie and won Sylvia Sidney the Golden Globe Award for Best Supporting Actress in a Series, Miniseries or a TV Movie. It also won the Peabody Award. The network, however, lost $500,000 in revenue because advertisers were leery about sponsoring the film. The film conveyed the prejudices surrounding HIV/AIDS at the time and the then common limited understanding by the general public of the methods of transmission and likelihood of infection.
