= Cowlip Productions =

American television production company

- Founders: Ron Cowen; Daniel Lipman
- Headquarters: California, United States
- Services: Television production

Cowlip Productions is a television production company owned by Ron Cowen and Daniel Lipman.

They produced the television series Sisters from 1990 to 1996 for NBC, and Queer as Folk from 2000 to 2005 for Showtime, both shows are co-produced by Warner Bros. Television.
