= Brian Kinney =

- Queer as Folk character
- First appearance: Season 1, Episode 1
- Last appearance: Season 5, Episode 13
- Created by: Ron Cowen; Daniel Lipman
- Portrayed by: Gale Harold
- UK counterpart: Stuart Alan Jones (Aidan Gillen)

In-universe information
- Nickname: Sonny Boy (by father)
- Gender: Male
- Title(s): CEO of Kinnetik; Owner of Babylon
- Occupation: Chief executive officer (Kinnetik); Nightclub owner (Babylon); Former: Advertising executive (Ryder); Partner (Vanguard)
- Family: Jack Kinney (father; deceased); Joan Kinney (mother; estranged); Claire Kinney (older sister; estranged); John and Peter (nephews, via Claire; estranged)
- Significant others: Justin Taylor (life partner)
- Children: Gus Peterson-Marcus (biological son, with Lindsay)

Brian A. Kinney is a fictional character from the American/Canadian Showtime television series Queer as Folk, a drama about the lives of a group of gay men and lesbians living in Pittsburgh, Pennsylvania. The character was created by Ron Cowen and Daniel Lipman, who developed, wrote and executive-produced the series, and was portrayed by American actor Gale Harold during the show's five-year run.

Handsome and masculine, Brian is a successful advertising executive who owns a lavish Pittsburgh loft and leads a glamorous and self-indulgent lifestyle. He is portrayed as extremely promiscuous and narcissistic, taking pride in his looks and his status as the most desirable man on Pittsburgh's Liberty Avenue. Brian completely rejects heteronormativity, in which he includes gay marriage and monogamy in general. His storylines on the show revolve around his refusal to adhere to these ideals, often putting him at odds with his gay friends who yearn to get married and start families of their own. Despite his feelings, Brian does father a child via artificial insemination with his close friend Lindsay, a lesbian, and ultimately develops a romantic and sexual relationship with young artist Justin Taylor, which is central throughout the series.

Brian has been the subject of controversy among LGBTQ critics of the show. He has been described as "the ultimate gay hero" for his liberationist philosophy, but has also been criticized for his representation of what many gay viewers believe are "negative stereotypes about gay men." In November 2007, Brian was voted the most popular gay television character of all time by AfterEllen's brother site, AfterElton.

== Background and personality ==
Brian Kinney was born to Jack and Joan Kinney in Pittsburgh, Pennsylvania. His family was Irish-Catholic, with his mother, in particular, being extremely devout and homophobic. Brian had an unstable childhood due to his father being an abusive alcoholic. Brian was physically abused by his father throughout his childhood and teenage years; it is unclear whether Jack was also abusive to Brian's older sister, Claire. During his high school years, Brian would escape the abuse in his home by staying with his best friend, Michael Novotny, whose mother, Debbie Novotny, ultimately began treating Brian like another son. After high school, Brian received a full scholarship to Carnegie Mellon, where he studied advertising. It is there that he meets another close friend, Lindsay Peterson, who shares an art history class with him.

Though Brian is open about his sexuality to Michael and Debbie and is highly sexually active during his teenage years, Brian only comes out to his parents when he is well into adulthood. Brian said he doesn't owe anything to his parents; he chose not to disclose his sexuality to them earlier because he has little relationship with them. However, he ultimately tells his father on his deathbed, and his mother accidentally finds out after seeing Justin Taylor in Brian's bedroom during a visit to his loft. Both parents' responses are overwhelmingly negative.

Brian's biggest fear is losing his youth and beauty. His best friend, Michael, often reassures him that he will "always be young, and always be beautiful." Lindsay, a sister-like figure to Brian, sometimes fondly calls him 'Peter', in reference to Peter Pan, the boy who never grows old; he calls her 'Wendy' in return. In one episode, Emmett Honeycutt's elderly boyfriend George Shickle describes Brian as "the love child of James Dean and Ayn Rand."

Despite Brian's seemingly uncaring and amoral nature, he is shown as loving his friends and will often make great sacrifices for them, even though he won't admit it. He plans a wedding for Lindsay and Melanie after theirs falls apart, and gives up his parental rights to his young son Gus so that Melanie and Lindsay will reunite in the first season. He pushes Michael away so that he will go back to his boyfriend. He helps his young lover Justin recover after a bashing at his senior prom, which Brian attended to please Justin. He gives up his job and money to beat the anti-gay candidate for mayor, Jim Stockwell and is willing to give up his loft and nightclub to be with Justin in the final episodes.

== Overview ==
In the pilot, Brian Kinney spots 17-year-old Justin Taylor on a street corner outside the gay nightclub Babylon. He proceeds to take Justin home and take his virginity. In the same episode, his son, Gus, is born to a lesbian couple, Lindsey and Melanie. Because of the simultaneity of these two pivotal events, Brian often associates Gus with Justin, referring to both as "sonny boy," Jack's nickname for Brian himself. During the first season, his relationship with Justin is unclear. Brian hates the idea of couples but breaks his own rules for Justin, unable to resist the pull he feels towards him. He takes care of him in different ways: letting him move into his loft after Justin is kicked out of his parents' home, going after him to NYC after he runs away, paying his college tuition, and advising him on school situations—thus by his actions, repeatedly disproving his own verbal declarations of not wanting him around.

After witnessing Justin's prom bashing, Brian is traumatized. No one, except Jennifer Taylor and the nursing staff, knows that Brian stands secret vigil outside Justin's hospital room every night for weeks. Upon Justin's release from the hospital, Jennifer bans Brian from seeing Justin but later asks him to 'take' her son, because Brian is the only one he trusts. During the second season, Brian helps Justin recover, both physically and emotionally. Justin confronts Brian by asking if the reason he is still living with Brian is because he feels guilty. Brian says that guilt was the reason he took Justin in, but it's not the reason he wants him to stay. To restrict Brian's promiscuity and protect himself, Justin sets some rules. Justin later breaks the rules with the more romantic Ethan Gold, and Brian tells Justin to decide who he wants to be with. Brian is hurt when Justin leaves him to be with Ethan, but will not admit it. Despite his outwardly detached nature, Brian's loneliness is evident in the beginning of the third season.

During the third season, Brian's success as an advertising executive comes into opposition with his beliefs when he is asked to head up the mayoral campaign of Jim Stockwell, the conservative, anti-gay police chief. Although he is initially instrumental in the candidate's rise, Brian later reunites with Justin and has a crisis of conscience, helping Justin produce and distribute anti-Stockwell propaganda posters. Caught red-handed, he loses his position with both the campaign and the advertising agency. Despite his lack of income, Brian maxes out all his credit cards to buy television ads exposing Stockwell's prior misdeeds, directly leading to his defeat in the mayoral election. When his friends find out that Brian personally funded the commercials and is now unemployed and in a large amount of debt, they hold a fundraiser, the proceeds from which Brian is initially resistant to accept, but ultimately does so gracefully. In the fourth season, he founds his own advertising agency, Kinnetik. He battles testicular cancer, especially tough because of his vanity and narcissism over his sexual prowess, and he attempts – unsuccessfully – to keep his diagnosis and treatment a secret from everyone. After beating cancer and completing a bike ride from Toronto to Pittsburgh, Brian reevaluates his life, deciding to take a more active role in his son's life and asking Justin to move back in.

In the fifth season, Justin moves out, frustrated at Brian's inability to form a committed relationship, for which Brian blames his best friend, Michael. After a bomb is set off at Babylon, which Brian owns by this season, Brian admits his love for Justin and mends his relationship with Michael. Brian proposes marriage to Justin, who eventually accepts. Brian later tells Justin that he should go to New York to pursue a promising art career, rather than give up an opportunity. They spend one last night together before Justin leaves. Justin reassures Brian that they will see each other frequently. Brian is seen at the destroyed Babylon dancing with Michael. However, as the camera tracks around them, the destroyed club begins to transform into a restored Babylon, suggesting that Brian has reconsidered and will re-open Babylon. He is last seen, dancing, before the credits begin to roll.
