= Harris Allan =

Canadian actor and artist (born 1985)

- Born: February 11, 1985 (age 41); Regina, Saskatchewan, Canada

Harris Allan (born February 11, 1985) is a Canadian actor, singer, musician and songwriter.

Harris Allan was a series regular on Showtime's series Queer as Folk, where he played the character of James (Hunter) Montgomery from 2003 until the show ended its five-year run in 2005. He began his professional acting career in Vancouver at the age of 12 as a guest star in the television series The New Addams Family. At 15 he guest-starred in three episodes of the CBC series Cold Squad. He has appeared in the WB series Smallville, US Network's The 4400 as well as on Showtime's Masters of Horror, CW's Supernatural and ABC's A Million Little Things. Allan's film credits include young Jonathan Glover in A Home at the End of the World, Final Destination 3 and Dan in the 2014 movie Date and Switch.

Allan is also a singer/songwriter and recording artist who began his music career at 16 as lead guitarist for the band Square9. Square9 released a self-titled full EP in 2005. Allan became hip hop/rap artist Fallan Soldier and released a full-length album "Above the Call of Duty" in 2009. After successfully touring throughout Western Canada and achieving some success at college radio, Allan became a DJ and spent the next five years refining his craft as a musician and singer. In November 2020 he released "One Last Ride" under his own name followed by "All In" and "M.O.B." in 2021.

== Film credits ==
- The Cannon - Millennial Actor 2 - (2017)
- Date and Switch - Dan - (2014)
- Spectacular! - Eric - (2009)
- Final Destination 3 - Roller Coaster Attendant - (2006)
- A Home at the End of the World - (young) Jonathan Glover - (2004)
- Don't Look Down - Kid - (1998)

== Television credits ==
- A Million Little Things - Devon - (2018) in 3rd episode of 3rd season: "Miles Apart" (2021)
- Supernatural - Lyle - in 2nd episode of 8th season: "What's Up, Tiger Mommy?" (2012)
- Power Rangers Taraso Force - Roy Marshall/Red Taraso Ranger - (2012)
- Masters of Horror - Pete - in episode "Jenifer" (2005)
- The 4400 - Sam - (2003) in episode: "The Fifth Page" (2005)
- Queer as Folk - James "Hunter" Montgomery : USA (2000) (2003–2005)
- Smallville - Jake Pollan - (2001) in episode: "Extinction" (2003)
- Cold Squad - Tyler - (1998) in episode: "Loose Ends" 12 (2001)
- Cold Squad - Tyler - (1998) in episode: "Loose Ends" Part 2. (2001)
- Cold Squad - Tyler - (1998) in episode: "Dead Soldiers" (2001)
- The New Addams Family - Boy Scout (1998) in episode: "Morticia and the Psychiatrist" (1998)

== Music credits ==
- Square9 - EP: Square9 - 2005
- Fallan Soldier - Album: Above the Call of Duty - 2009
- Harris Allan - Single: One Last Ride - 2020
- Harris Allan - Single: All In - 2021
- Harris Allan - Single: M.O.B. - 2021
- Harris Allan - Single: Eyes on You - 2021
- Harris Allan - Single: Out of Road - 2022
