= Scott Lowell =

American actor (born 1965)

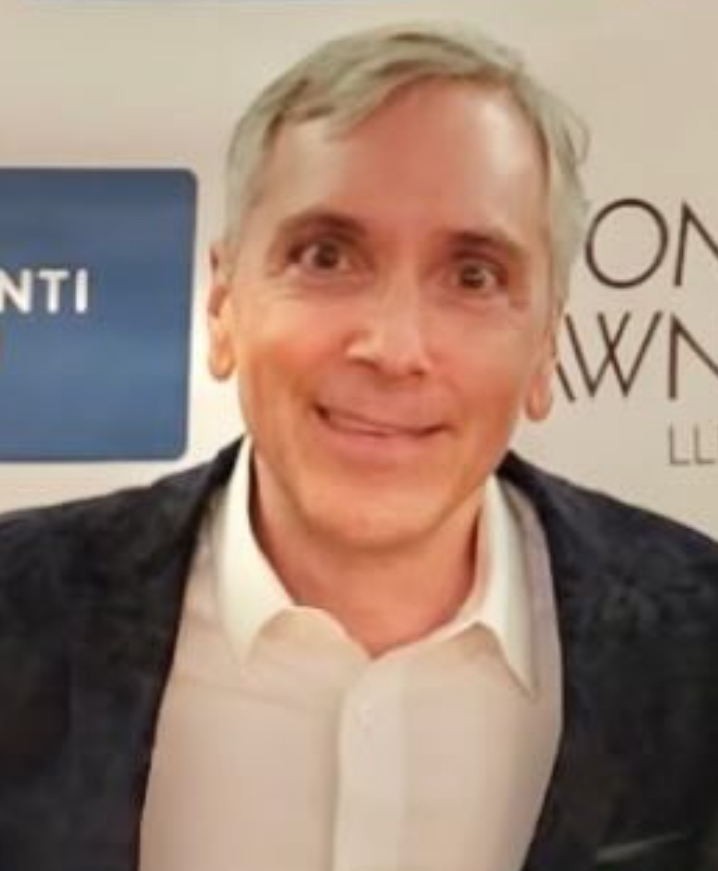
- Lowell in 2025.
- Born: February 22, 1965 (age 61); Denver, Colorado, U.S.
- Education: Connecticut College
- Occupation: actor
- Website: scottlowell.com

Scott Lowell (born February 22, 1965) is an American actor best known for his role as Ted Schmidt on the Showtime drama Queer as Folk.

== Biography ==
Lowell was born on February 22, 1965, and was adopted in Denver, Colorado. His biological parents are Pentecostal and his adoptive parents are Jewish. He grew up outside New Haven, Connecticut. He attended Hopkins School and Connecticut College in New London, Connecticut. He moved to Chicago shortly after college to pursue acting.

He serves on the board of the Tyler Clementi Foundation.

== Filmography ==
=== Film ===
Year	Title	Role	Notes
1996	Opus 27	Beethoven	Short film
1999	Love Bites	Ian	Short film
1999	The Debtors	George	
2000	Ladies Room LA	Dan	Short film
2000	Damned If You Do	Funny guy	Short film
2006	Trapped Ashes	Henry	
2007	Ping Pong Playa	Tom	
2008	To Live and Die in Dixie	Parker Bryant	
2008	Scubaman	Scubaman	Short film
2009	Walter's Wife	Walter	Short film
2011	Dinner with Fred	Heywood Flannigan	Short film
2011	The Chicago 8	Richard Schultz	
2014	Better Half	Zack Riley	
2016	Be Good for Rachel	Dr. Tim Reid	Short film
2016	$hitty Job$	Uber passenger	Short film
2018	Monsoon	Mark	

=== Television ===
Year	Title	Role	Notes
1997	Early Edition	Scott the florist	"The Wedding" (uncredited)
1999	Caroline in the City	Carl	"Caroline and the Firing Squad"
2000	Frasier	Chuck	"Something About Dr. Mary"
2000	Alien Fury: Countdown to Invasion	Laird Jones	Television film
2000-2005	Queer As Folk	Ted Schmidt	Main role; 83 episodes
2001	On the Edge	Charlie	Television film
2006-2009	American Dad!	Felix/Brett/Barney	"Failure is Not a Factory-installed Option" (Felix voice) "Lincoln Lover" (Brett voice) "Escape from Pearl Bailey" (Barney voice) "Home Adrone" (voice)
2008	Criminal Minds	Mike Hicks	"The Crossing"
2008	Leverage	Andrew Grant	"The Miracle Job"
2009	Heroes	Professor	"Jump, Push, Fall" "Orientation"
2010	Proposition 8 Trial Re-Enactment	Dr. Gregory M. Herek	TV series documentary
2010	The Defenders	Conlon	"Nevada v. Carter"
2010	Donna's Revenge	Steve	"For All Life's Moments, Real or Imagined" "The Great American Shrink-Off"
2011-2014	Bones	Dr. Douglas Filmore	Recurring role, 3 episodes "The Feet on the Beach" "The Suit on the Set" "The Master in the Slop"
2011	NCIS	Terry Thomas	"One Last Score"
2011	Supah Ninjas	Mr. Bradford	"Mr. Bradford"
2011	CSI: NY	Coach Dwight Gavin	"Air Apparent"
2012	Castle	David Hernande	"An Embarrassment of Bitches"
2012	CSI: Crime Scene Investigation	Gavin Pearson	"CSI on Fire"
2013	The Fosters	Doctor	"Vigil"
2016	Rush Hour	Richard Wakefield	"The Dark Night"
2016	Lucky Jay		"Late February"
2016	Adoptable	Scott Fishman	Main role; 6 episodes
2017	Hashtag Awareness: The Webseries	Darren	"The One Where Darren Can't Take a Break"
2019	I'm Sorry	Dr. Walsh	"Extra Boobs"

=== Theater ===
Year	Title	Role	Notes
1986	The Creation of the World and Other Business	Lucifer	Anathong Ensemble
1988	James and the Giant Peach	Centipede	Lifeline Theater
1988	Orwell Down and Out	George Orwell	Bailiwick Rep
1989	Wild Honey	Dr. Triletsky	Bailiwick Rep
1986	Incorruptible	Camille Desmoulin	Bailiwick Rep; Joseph Jefferson Nomination for Best Performance by an Actor in a Supporting Role
1989	A Christmas Carol	Christmas Yet To Come/Spud/Fiddler	Goodman Theater
1990	Jacques and his Master	Saint-Ouen/Marquis	Commons Theater
1990	Twelfth Night	Feste	Steppenwolf (Outreach)
1990	Chicago Conspiracy Trial	Rennie Davis	Remains Theater
1991	The Big Bang	Ensemble	Stage Left Theater
1991	Icarus's Mother	Howard	Strawdog Theater
1992	King John	Robert Faulkenbridge/Lord Bigot	Shakespeare Rep
1992	Much Ado About Nothing	Conrade	Shakespeare Rep
1992	Greater Tuna	Arvis Struvie	Belfry Theater (Lake Geneva, WI)
1993	The White Rose	Alexander Schmorell	Northlight Theater
1993	The Merchant of Venice	Launcelot Gobbo	Shakespeare's Motley Crew
1993	Assassins	John Wilkes Booth	Pegasus Players; Joseph Jefferson Citation for Best Production
1994	Picasso at the Lapin Agile	Picasso	Steppenwolf
1994-1995	Laughter on the 23rd Floor	Val	Fox Theatricals
1995	A Perfect Ganesh	The Man	Northlight Theater
1996	What Where	Bim	Splinter Group (Buckets o' Beckett Festival)
1997	Light Up The Sky	Sven/Orson/Max	Goodman Theater
1997-1998	Shear Madness	Tony	Blackstone Theater
1998	Present Laughter	Roland Maule	Pasadena Playhouse
1999	Anna Christie	Larry	LA TheatreWorks
1999	Durang, Durang	Chris	Hollywood Court Theater
2001	Caine Mutiny Court-Martial	Lt. Tom Keefer	LA TheatreWorks
2001	Bedtime Stories	Alan	Arcade Theatre
2006	The Heidi Chronicles	Scoop Rosenbaum	Berkshire Theatre Festival
2008	Orson's Shadow	Kenneth Tynan	Pasadena Playhouse
2009	The Pain and the Itch	Cash	Furious Theatre Co./Theatre @ the Boston Court
2010	A Devil at Noon	Tom	National Playwright's Conference; O’Neill Theatre Center
2010	Blithe Spirit	Charles Condomine	A Noise Within
2011	Acquainted with the Night	Maxwell	National Playwright's Conference; O’Neill Theatre Center
2012	The Elephant Man	Lord John/Snork/Pinhead Manager	Williamstown Theatre Festival
2013	The Big Meal	Man #2	Artists Repertory Theatre, Portland, OR
2013	12 Angry Men	Juror #1 (The Foreman)	Pasadena Playhouse, CA
2014-2015	The Elephant Man	Lord John/Snork/Pinhead Manager	Broadway's Booth Theatre; October 18, 2014 — January 18, 2015 (originally); Broadway debut; November 7, 2014 — February 15, 2014

=== Conventions ===
Year	Title	Role	Notes
2012	Rise 'n Shine Con; Cologne, Germany	Himself	June 8–10. QAF convention with co-actors Randy Harrison, Sharon Gless; Peter Paige, Robert Gant, Hal Sparks, Michelle Clunie, Thea Gill & Harris Allan
2013	Rise 'n Shine Con; Los Angeles, California, USA	Himself	June 9. QAF convention with co-actors Randy Harrison, Gale Harold, Peter Paige, Robert Gant, Michelle Clunie & Ryan Scott Greene
2014	Queens of the Road Con; Bilbao, Spain	Himself	March 28–30. Queer as Folk convention with co-actors Gale Harold, Randy Harrison & Peter Paige
