= Chris Grismer =

Canadian film director, television director

Chris Grismer is a Canadian director and producer of film, television and music videos, now residing in Los Angeles. His debut feature film, Clutch, premiered at the 1998 Toronto International Film Festival, before going into commercial release in 2000.

His television credits include Designated Survivor, Killjoys, The Vampire Diaries, The Originals, The Nine Lives of Chloe King, Playmakers, This Is Wonderland, Queer As Folk, Pretty Little Liars, Deputy, Prodigal Son and Quantum Leap.

As a music video director, he has directed videos for Arcade Fire, Broken Social Scene, Metric, Stars, Death From Above 1979, Magneta Lane, The Fembots and Motion City Soundtrack.

He was nominated for a Gemini Award in 2009 for his work on Being Erica.
