= Justin Taylor =

Justin Taylor Kinney
- Queer as Folk character
- First appearance: Season 1, Episode 1
- Last appearance: Season 5, Episode 13
- Created by: Ron Cowen; Daniel Lipman
- Portrayed by: Randy Harrison
- UK counterpart: Nathan Maloney (Charlie Hunnam)

In-universe information
- Nicknames: Sunshine (by Debbie and Brian); Boy Wonder (by Michael)
- Gender: Male
- Occupation: Artist; Comic book artist (Rage); Former: Student (high school graduate; attended art school); Busboy at the Liberty Diner; Go-go dancer (Babylon)
- Family: Craig Taylor (father; estranged); Jennifer Taylor (mother); Molly Taylor (younger sister)
- Significant others: Brian Kinney (life partner) boyfriend and Husband

Justin Taylor Kinney is a fictional character from the American/Canadian Showtime television series Queer as Folk, a drama about the lives of a group of gay men and women living in Pittsburgh, Pennsylvania.

The character was created by Ron Cowen and Daniel Lipman, who developed, wrote and executive-produced the series, and was portrayed by American actor Randy Harrison during the show's five-year run, and is based on Nathan Maloney of Russell T Davies' original British series of the same name. Known for his optimism and cheery disposition, Justin is a gay teenager who seeks out a gay community in his hometown of Pittsburgh. After losing his virginity to Brian Kinney during his senior year of high school, Justin falls in love with Brian, and their relationship becomes a central part of the series. Many of Justin's storylines revolve around his desire for a more committed relationship with Brian; in later seasons, the character's storylines begin to focus more on his developing career as an artist.

In 2007, the character was voted number 3 on the list of the top 25 gay television characters of all time by AfterElton.

== Background and personality ==
In the pilot episode, Justin Taylor is a high school student at St. James Academy, a private school in Pittsburgh, Pennsylvania. His father, Craig Taylor, owns an electronics business called Taylor Electronics, and his mother, Jennifer, is a real estate agent. During the first season, Justin's parents struggle to come to terms with their son's homosexuality. His father kicks him out of the house, and Justin remains estranged from his father for the rest of the series. While his mother Jennifer needs a little time to understand her son, after several months she becomes supportive of Justin and becomes involved in PFLAG.

Justin is teased by many of the male students at his school who suspect he is gay, and he spends most of his time with his best friend Daphne Chanders. He excels at school and desires to be an artist. After meeting Brian Kinney, Justin is brought into Brian's circle of friends, with Michael Novotny's mother, Debbie Novotny, soon treating Justin as another son. Justin appreciates romance and aspires to be monogamous with Brian; in later seasons, he mentions wanting to get married and have a family. Justin attends the Pittsburgh Institute of Fine Arts and works on the Rage comic book with Michael.

== Overview ==
Brian meets Justin, a virgin, outside the gay club Babylon, and takes him home to have sex with him. Justin is responsible for naming Gus, the biological son of Brian and Lindsay. Justin falls in love with Brian after their encounter and eventually gets Brian to have sex with him again, breaking Brian's own rule of not having sex with the same person more than once. This causes Brian's best friend Michael Novotny to become jealous and hostile towards Justin.

Justin frequently confides in his best friend Daphne Chanders. Late in Season 1, she asks him to be the boy to take her virginity, since he is experienced. He agrees, and she falls in love with him the same way Justin fell in love with Brian. However, Justin shoots down her advances, and although it leads to an altercation, they go back to being friends.

Justin tries a number of things to get Brian to love him back, including competing in (and winning) the "King of Babylon" dance contest, stealing one of Brian's tricks, dancing with guys Brian is interested in, and asking Brian to the prom, among other things. Despite initially turning Justin down, Brian shows up at Justin's prom and dances with him, kissing him in front of everybody. Justin described it as "the best night of [his] life." After his prom, he is bashed by a fellow student, Chris Hobbs, resulting in a two-week coma, and brain damage that limits the use of his hand. This event impacts his life immensely and the effects are seen throughout the series.

Justin is accepted to Dartmouth College but opts to go to the Pittsburgh Institute of Fine Arts (PIFA) to pursue his dreams. With Justin's diminished use of his drawing hand, Brian gets a drawing computer for Justin to use. He continues his arts degree at PIFA and with Brian's friend Michael, creates a gay superhero comic called Rage, with stories often based on their own lives.

He experiences financial trouble when his father refuses to pay for his tuition. He resorts to becoming a go-go dancer at Babylon, despite Brian's repeated offers to help him out financially. Justin's new job takes its toll on him, the night shift causing him to lack energy during the daytime. After a disastrous experience at a party, he is forced to accompany his boss to a location where a number of men try to rape him, he finally quits his job and accepts Brian's financial assistance. Justin starts a relationship with Ethan Gold, a fellow student and talented violinist, when he feels Brian isn't giving him the love and affection he wants. After Ethan cheats on him with a fan, Justin takes Daphne's advice and tries to win Brian back by getting a placement at Brian's advertisement agency. After a few tense days, Justin finally manages to seduce Brian once more in his office late one night. This sparks them to reconcile and continue their relationship.

On more than one occasion, Justin saves Brian from legal problems. The first time, he blackmails Kip into dropping his sexual harassment lawsuit against Vanguard and Brian. The second time, while Justin is still with Ethan, he makes Brian's nephew tell the truth about whether or not he molested him. Justin drops out of college after a disagreement with the head of the internship program when it is discovered that he has been having sexual relations with his boss, Brian, and sabotaging Chief Jim Stockwell's ad campaign.

During the fifth and final season, Brian and Justin's relationship becomes more unstable. Justin works on a movie version of Rage but the project is canceled. When Justin returns from Los Angeles and moves back in with Brian; he expects them to settle down, which Brian still doesn't want to. He leaves Brian, but after a bomb explodes at Babylon, Brian admits his love for Justin, asking him to marry him. They plan to get married, but as the date draws closer, Justin realizes that Brian is trying to become someone he isn't, just to make Justin happy. Similarly, Brian realizes that Justin is giving up his career as an artist to settle down with him. Brian tells him that he should go to New York City to pursue his art career. They agree to call off the wedding, saying "we don't need rings or vows to prove that we love each other."

Before leaving, Brian and Justin spend one final night together. Brian tells Justin that he has kept the rings, and Justin reassures Brian that they will continue to see each other frequently.

== Recognition ==
In 2007, Justin was voted number 3 on the list of the top 25 gay television characters of all time by AfterEllen's brother site AfterElton.

The site called him "one of television’s most fully realized gay teenaged characters, Justin Taylor was 17 years old when Queer as Folk debuted. Over the five seasons the show ran, he started a Gay-Straight Alliance at his high school, was brutally gay-bashed at his prom, had to learn how to use his right hand again during his first year of art school, created a successful underground gay comic, fought the election of a homophobic mayor, opposed an anti-gay statewide ballot proposition, and achieved acclaim as an artist. Portrayed by out gay actor Randy Harrison, Justin was never one for agonizing over his sexual orientation or struggling with coming out. He may have made a couple of soapy detours through a brief career as a go-go boy and as a member of a gay vigilante group, but Justin Taylor was the first out, proud, and politically active gay teen on American series television."
