= Michael MacLennan =

Canadian playwright, screenwriter, and producer of television shows

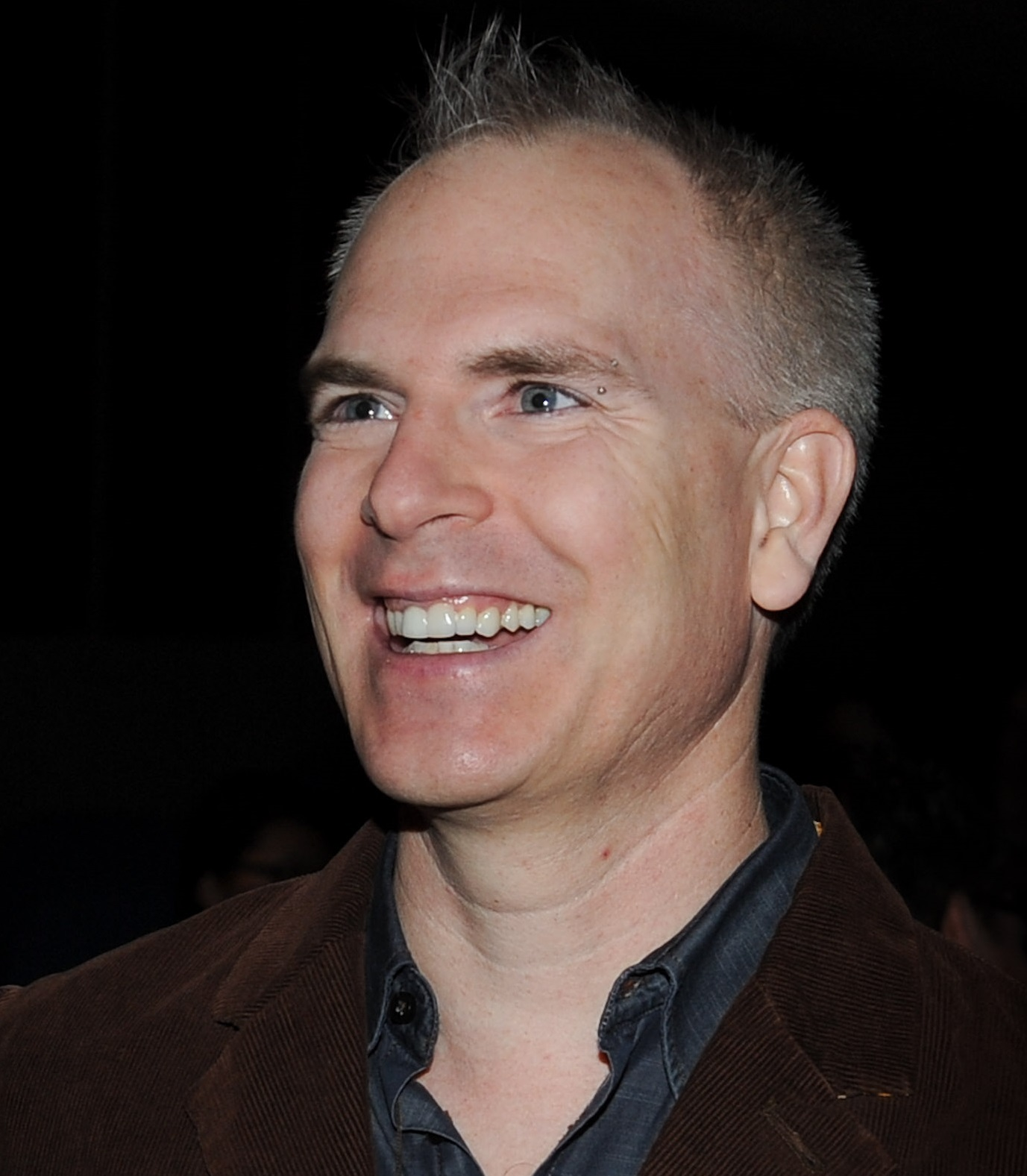
- MacLennan at the Bell Media Prime Time TV Program Showcase in 2014
- Born: Michael Lewis MacLennan; June 5, 1968 (age 58); Vancouver, British Columbia, Canada
- Education: University of Victoria
- Occupations: playwright, television writer, producer
- Known for: Queer as Folk, Bomb Girls
- Website: Official website

Michael Lewis MacLennan (born June 5, 1968) is a Canadian playwright, television writer and television producer, best known as a writer and producer of television series such as Queer as Folk and Bomb Girls.

As a playwright he is a two-time nominee for the Governor General's Award for English-language drama, and the only playwright to win the Herman Voaden Playwriting Competition twice.

== Career ==
Born in Vancouver, British Columbia, MacLennan began his career as a stage actor. In his first theatre role at age 13, he was cast to play a woman, and later in his career he produced a short performance piece about his fear at the time that his parents would see the play and realize that he was gay. He moved to Victoria in 1986 to study English at the University of Victoria.

His first full-length play, Beat the Sunset, premiered at the Victoria Fringe Festival in 1993. It was later staged in Vancouver in 1995, winning MacLennan a Jessie Award for outstanding emerging playwright and the Theatrum National Playwriting Competition.

His second play, Leaning Over Railings, premiered in 1995. His 1996 Grace won the Theatre BC National Playwriting Competition, and has been produced across Canada and internationally. During this era, he also wrote a number of short one-act plays, including Wake No Clocks and Come On!.

He then began to study screenwriting at the Canadian Film Centre, although he continued to write plays during this time. He won the Herman Voaden Playwrighting Competition in 1998 for his play The Shooting Stage, and in 2001 for Last Romantics. Both plays were later nominated for the Governor General's Award for English drama, The Shooting Stage at the 2002 Governor General's Awards and Last Romantics at the 2003 Governor General's Awards.

He began his television career as writer and story editor for Sullivan Entertainment's television series Wind at My Back, Anne of Green Gables: The Animated Series and Super Rupert. He then became a writer and co-executive producer on Queer as Folk, writing 14 episodes over four seasons. Concurrently with the final season of Queer as Folk, he co-created and produced the Citytv dramedy series Godiva's in 2005.

In 2006, he created a theatrical adaptation of Douglas Coupland's novel Life After God, resulting in Coupland inviting him to write and coproduce the television series adaptation of Coupland's novel jPod.

He was cocreator and executive producer of Bomb Girls, which premiered in 2011.

His other credits as a writer and producer have included The Guard, Being Erica, Flashpoint, Bitten and The Fosters.

== Plays ==
- Beat the Sunset (ISBN 0-88754-549-1)
- Grace
- The Shooting Stage (ISBN 0-88754-640-4)
- Last Romantics (ISBN 0-88754-676-5)
- Life After God
