= Jack Wetherall =

Canadian actor (born 1950)

- Born: August 5, 1950 (age 76); Sault Ste. Marie, Ontario, Canada
- Known for: Vic Grassi

Jack Wetherall (born August 5, 1950) is a Canadian actor and director residing in New York City. Although best known for his supporting role as Vic Grassi on the television series Queer as Folk, he has been primarily associated with stage roles.

His roles at the Stratford Festival have included the title role in Henry V, Saturninus in Titus Andronicus, Konstantin in The Seagull, Orlando in As You Like It, Malcolm in Macbeth, Octavius in Julius Caesar, Ned in Ned and Jack, Demetrius in A Midsummer Night's Dream and Ferdinand in The Tempest. He also played the title role in the original Broadway production of The Elephant Man.
