= Dean Armstrong =

Canadian actor (born 1973)

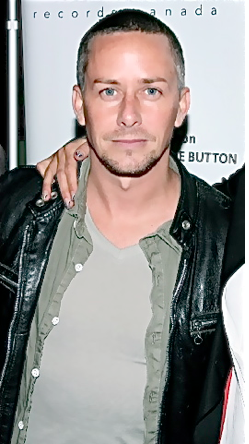
- Armstrong at the 2011 Toronto International Film Festival
- Born: April 24, 1973 (age 53); Owen Sound, Ontario, Canada
- Occupation: Actor
- Years active: 1999–present
- Children: 5, including Ryan
- Website: www.deanarmstrong.ca

Dean Armstrong (born April 24, 1973) is a Canadian actor.

== Early life ==
Armstrong was born in Owen Sound, Ontario. He attended Queen's University in Kingston, Ontario, and graduated with degrees in theater arts and education.

== Career ==
In 2000, Armstrong appeared as the recurring character Blake in the TV series Queer as Folk. In 2005, Armstrong appeared in the Canadian premiere of Tick, Tick... Boom!.

== Filmography ==
=== Film ===
Year	Title	Role	Notes
2005	Recipe for a Perfect Christmas	Reynard	
2010	Verona	Drew	
2010	Saw 3D	Cale	
2011	Wrong Turn 4: Bloody Beginnings	Daniel Mullins	
2012	Hiding	Mr. Ostrog	
2013	Time of Death	Vincent Delucas	
2014	The Gabby Douglas Story	Brent	
2014	Joy Ride 3: Roadkill	Officer Williams	
2015	A Wish Come True	Billy Madox	
2016	Rough Cut	Producer	
2017	Deadly Secrets by the Lake	Deputy Chief Lewton	
2018	The Queen of Sin	Alexander Gorser	
2018	TMI Crossing the Threshold	Robert Ames	
2020	A Perfect Plan	Harris	
2020	Getting to Know You	Ted Simpson	
2023	The Old Way	Clark	
2023	Better Days	Ralph	
2024	She Came Back	John Talbot	

=== Television ===
Year	Title	Role	Notes
1999	Twice in a Lifetime	Bruce Bennet	
1999	Earth: Final Conflict	Hotel Volunteer	
2003	Doc	Scotty Redfield	
2005	The Newsroom	Bob Walker	
2000-2005	Queer as Folk	Blake Wyzecki	
2004-2006	True Crimes: The First 72 Hours	Jordan Readon/Campbell	
2007	'Til Death Do Us Part	Jason	
2008	Repo! The Genetic Opera	Thankless Job Victim	
2010	Haven	Geoff McShaw	
2011	The Listener	Dylan Morris	
2011	Alphas	Milos Kosar	
2012	Flashpoint	Anson Holt	
2013	Copper	John Sutton	
2014	The Lottery	Jay Ruchman	
2015-2016	Heroes Reborn	Special Agent Cole Cutler	
2016	Beauty & the Beast	State Trooper Lt. Maron	
2017	Nirvanna the Band the Show	Customer	
2017	Motives & Murders: Cracking the Case	Dave Hofstad	
2017	Salvation	Grant	
2018	Insomnia	Richard Croft	
2018	Supernatural	Kip	Episode: "Stranger in a Strange Land"
2019	In the Dark	Michael Roberts	
2019	AEG Live Studio Actors on Actors	Dean Armstrong	
2021	Chapelwaite	Dr. Guilford	
2023	Rabbit Hole	Barry Merrill	
2024	Sullivan's Crossing	Glenn Perry	
2024	The Madness	Chief Buck Stanton	Episode: "Loco"

== Filmmaking ==
Year	Title	Role	Notes
2010	Verona	Executive Producer	Short Film
2015	Lockdown	Producer & Director	Short Film
2015	ActEd Online	Executive Producer & Director	TV Series
2024	She Came Back	Co-Producer	Film
