= Makyla Smith =

Canadian actress (born 1982)

Makyla Smith (born 1982) is a Canadian actress who is best known for playing Daphne on Showtime's Queer as Folk.

== Career ==
Smith is best known for her supporting role as Justin's (Randy Harrison) best friend Daphne on Queer as Folk. She also appeared in the films The Matthew Shepard Story, Sex, Lies & Obsession, Owning Mahowny, Homeless to Harvard: The Liz Murray Story and Prom Queen: The Marc Hall Story.

== Personal life ==
Smith is the daughter of the Barbados-born actress Alison Sealy-Smith and an English-Canadian man.

== Filmography ==
=== Film ===
Year	Title	Role	Notes
2003	Owning Mahowny	Car Rental Girl	

=== Television ===
Year	Title	Role	Notes
1998–1999	The Famous Jett Jackson	Silverstone Girl / Hallway Girl	3 episodes
1999	Animorphs	Tanya	Episode: "Face Off: Part 1"
1999–2005	Queer as Folk	Daphne Chanders	Recurring role
2000	Dear America: Color Me Dark	Nellie Lee Love	Television film
2000, 2001	Caitlin's Way	Portia Pettigrew	2 episodes
2001	Sex, Lies & Obsession	Juliet	Television film
2002	The Red Sneakers	Tanya	Television film
2002	The Matthew Shepard Story	Casey	Television film
2003	Homeless to Harvard: The Liz Murray Story	Chris	Television film
2004	Prom Queen: The Marc Hall Story	Britney 1	Television film
2006	Zoé Kézako	Voice	3 episodes
2004–2006	6teen	Sharmaine	6 episodes
