= Daniel Lipman =

American screenwriter (born 1950)

- Born: August 2, 1950 (age 76); Baltimore, Maryland, U.S.
- Occupations: Television producer, television writer

Daniel Lipman is a writer and producer from Baltimore, Maryland. His best-known work to date is writing for and producing the hit American television shows Queer as Folk and Sisters. He is a partner with Ron Cowen in the television production company Cowlip Productions.

== Filmography ==
=== Writer ===
- Queer as Folk (2000–2005)
- Sisters (1991)
- The Love She Sought (1990) (aka A Green Journey)
- An Early Frost (1985)
- Family (1976/III)

=== Producer ===
- Queer as Folk (2000–2005)
- Sisters (1991)
- The Love She Sought (1990)
- An Early Frost (1985)
