= Ron Cowen =

American dramatist

- Born: September 15, 1944 (age 82); Cincinnati, Ohio, U.S.
- Occupations: Television producer, television writer, playwright

Ron Cowen is an American television producer, television writer, and playwright. He is a partner with Daniel Lipman in the television production company Cowlip Productions.

== Filmography ==
=== As a writer ===
- Queer as Folk (2000–2005) TV Series (developed by, writer) with Daniel Lipman
- Sisters (1991) TV Series (created by, writer) with Daniel Lipman
- The Love She Sought (1990) (TV film) with Daniel Lipman
- An Early Frost (1985) (TV film) with Daniel Lipman
- Knots Landing (1984) with Daniel Lipman
- Emerald Point N.A.S. with Daniel Lipman
- Paul's Case (1980) (TV film)
- Family (1976/III) (TV Series, writer) with Daniel Lipman
- I'm a Fool (1976) (TV film)
- Saturday Adoption (1968) (original play for TV)

=== As a producer ===
- Queer as Folk (2000–2005) TV Series (executive producer) with Daniel Lipman
- Sisters (1991) TV Series (executive producer) with Daniel Lipman
- The Love She Sought (1990) (TV) (co-producer) with Daniel Lipman
- An Early Frost (1985) (TV) (associate producer) with Daniel Lipman

== Theatre ==
- Gene & Jean, co-playwright (with Daniel Lipman)
- Summertree (1967), playwright, world premiere, Zellerbach Theater, University of Pennsylvania (1968)
- Valentine's Day (1968), libretto and lyrics, revised 1975
- Porcelain Time (1972), playwright
- The Book of Murder (1974), playwright
- Inside Lulu (1974), playwright
- Unnatural Acts (1975), co-playwright, three one-acts (with Daniel Lipman)
- Betty Blue Eyes (2011), co-librettist, musical (with Daniel Lipman)
