= List of Make It or Break It characters =

Make It or Break It is an American television series created by Holly Sorensen. The one-hour drama premiered on ABC Family on June 22, 2009, and lasted three seasons. This fictional series is centered around four teenage gymnasts as they train for the Olympics at the Rocky Mountain Gymnastic Training Center, also known as The Rock. The show features various characters, including the gymnasts' families, employees at The Rock, and workers at the local hangout, the Pizza Shack.

== Main characters ==
Actor	Character	Count	Seasons		
Actor	Character	Count	1	2	3
Chelsea Hobbs	Emily Kmetko	36	Main	Main	
Ayla Kell	Payson Keeler	48	Main	Main	Main
Josie Loren	Kaylie Cruz	48	Main	Main	Main
Cassie Scerbo	Lauren Tanner	47	Main	Main	Main
Candace Cameron Bure	Summer Van Horne	41	Main	Main	Recurring
Neil Jackson	Sasha Belov	36	Main	Main	Recurring
Anthony Starke	Steve Tanner	35	Main	Main	Recurring
Peri Gilpin	Kim Keeler	40	Main	Main	
Susan Ward	Chloe Kmetko	39	Main	Main	
Johnny Pacar	Damon Young	22	Main	Main	
Chelsea Tavares	Jordan Randall	8			Main
Dondre Whitfield	Coach McIntyre	8			Main

== The Rock ==
- Sasha Belov (played by Neil Jackson) is the new coach at The Rock who replaces Marty Walsh after he moves to Denver. Sasha is the only Olympic gymnast to have ever defeated Marty and has four Olympic gold medals. He has a strict coaching style but also deeply cares for his gymnasts and wants them to reach their full potential. Sasha's coaching methods include rigorous training exercises as punishment, and he is known for his compassion and support, particularly towards Emily's mother and Payson during her recovery from surgery. Previously, Sasha had to quit coaching after a tragic incident in which a gymnast died from a head injury under his supervision. This is his first coaching job in over five years. He briefly dates Rock manager Summer despite their differing beliefs, but later leaves The Rock because he believes his presence is detrimental to the girls. However, he returns after being visited by Payson, Lauren, and Emily in Romania and eventually becomes the coach of the US Worlds Gymnastics team. In the end, there are hints of a possible reconciliation between Sasha and Summer.
- Summer van Horne (played by Candace Cameron Bure) is Steve Tanner's ex-girlfriend and former assistant. She shares with Lauren that she had a promiscuous past before finding faith and refers to herself as "the school slut." After breaking up with Steve, she develops a close relationship with Lauren, acting as a maternal figure. Summer is the current manager of The Rock and lives her life based on her Christian beliefs, which often amuse and frustrate Sasha. There is a romantic tension between Sasha and Summer, leading to an inappropriate kiss and a passionate kiss later on. However, they mutually agreed to break up before Sasha's departure from The Rock. Summer eventually reunites with Steve, and they plan to get married. However, when she discovers Sasha's stance on Emily's pregnancy, she decides to marry someone who shares her moral views and accepts Steve's proposal. After a revelation about Lauren's actions, Summer leaves Steve and Lauren once again. She later returns to support Lauren when she undergoes open heart surgery. In the series finale, there are indications of a potential reconciliation between Sasha and Summer as they discuss regrets and possibilities.
- Kim Keeler (played by Peri Gilpin) is the mother of Payson and Becca. As a no-nonsense stay-at-home mom, Kim provides stability and moral guidance for her family and those around her. She often advises Payson on issues related to beauty and femininity. Kim works as a manager at The Rock alongside Summer van Horne. Although she took a break at one point, she later resumed her role as the gym's manager. Kim ran for the Rock Board but faced a setback when a secret about her daughter was revealed.

== Kmetko family ==
- Emily Kmetko (played by Chelsea Hobbs) joins The Rock as the newest member after being recruited by Marty, who noticed her practicing at the YMCA in Fresno. Despite the rule against having a job, Emily works nights and weekends at The Pizza Shack to help support her family, in addition to her gymnastics training. She develops a romantic relationship with Damon, her coworker at The Pizza Shack and an aspiring songwriter. Emily's gymnastics career faces challenges when she is arrested for stealing her brother's medication during a seizure. She later loses her virginity to Damon, but they break up a few weeks later. At the Hungarian meeting, Emily discovers she is pregnant with Damon's child due to not using protection. She decides to quit gymnastics rather than have an abortion, as advised by the national chairman. Emily then moves to Las Vegas to live with her godmother, cherishing the memories of her time in gymnastics. Although she does not appear in Season 3, her name is mentioned three times.
- Chloe Kmetko (played by Susan Ward) is Emily and Brian's mother. As a free-spirited individual, Chloe became a teenage mother when she got pregnant with Emily and has struggled to fulfill the responsibilities of motherhood ever since. While deeply devoted to her daughter and occasionally displaying insightful moments, Chloe has faced financial challenges and difficulties in caring for her special-needs son and emotionally sensitive daughter. She initially works at a beauty salon but later becomes a bartender at a strip club. Chloe enters into a relationship with Steve Tanner, whom she met anonymously online, but they eventually break up due to Emily's discomfort with Steve financially supporting her family and Lauren's concerns about Chloe trying to replace her mother. When Emily becomes pregnant, Chloe advises her on the challenges of being a teenage mother and suggests having an abortion to pursue her dreams. Tearfully, Chloe witnesses Emily's departure to Las Vegas after deciding to keep the baby and makes her final appearance while closing the family's account with The Rock. She expresses her best wishes for her daughter and describes motherhood as a "hard but beautiful life."
- Brian Kmetko (played by Wyatt Smith) is Emily's younger half-brother and one of her strongest supporters. He uses a wheelchair and has a seizure disorder for which he requires medication. Brian is a kind and supportive brother to Emily.

== Keeler family ==
- Payson Keeler (played by Ayla Kell) is a highly skilled female gymnast at The Rock and ranks among the top gymnasts in the country. She is known for her dedication and determination in pursuing her gymnastics career. Payson initially feels betrayed when Marty leaves The Rock, but she supports Sasha as the new coach and appreciates his strict coaching style. During Nationals, she sustained a lumbosacral fracture from a fall during her uneven bars routine, which is believed to be a career-ending injury. This setback leads Payson to give up on her dreams and transition to a regular school, where she struggles to adapt and befriends a group of less motivated students. However, her family learns about an experimental surgery that offers the possibility of a full recovery. Despite her parents' concerns, Payson undergoes the surgery and successfully recovers. However, her physical changes require her to adapt her previous power-oriented style of gymnastics. With Sasha's guidance, she develops a more artistic approach and earns a place on the World Team. During her training, Payson develops a crush on Sasha and impulsively kisses him, but he rejects her advances. Payson realizes her mistake and apologizes to Sasha, who understands the situation. However, a manipulated tape of the kiss is sent to the National Committee, resulting in Sasha's retirement. Payson and Sasha reconcile after his return from Romania. Although Payson faces challenges at Worlds, she delivers a flawless vault and sticks the landing on one foot, showcasing her determination and skill. Payson is focused and determined, prioritizing her gymnastics career, but she also experiences romantic relationships with Max and later Rigo, with whom she loses her virginity. Payson appears in every episode of the series, along with Kaylie Cruz.
- Kim Keeler (played by Peri Gilpin) is the mother of Payson and Becca. As a no-nonsense stay-at-home mom, Kim provides steady guidance and serves as a moral support system for her family and others around her. She often offers counsel to Payson on topics related to beauty and femininity. Kim works as the manager at The Rock, taking a break at one point but eventually returning to her position. She runs for the Rock Board but faces defeat when a secret about her daughter is exposed.
- Mark Keeler (played by Brett Cullen) is the father of Payson and Becca. After losing his job in Boulder, he commutes to Minnesota for work. Mark is a caring individual who prioritizes his family's well-being.
- Becca Keeler (played by Mia Rose Frampton) is Payson's younger sister and a junior gymnast at The Rock. While not as focused or serious about gymnastics as Payson, Becca's improvement in the sport causes some jealousy from Payson.

== Cruz family ==
- Kaylie Cruz (played by Josie Loren) is an accomplished gymnast at The Rock. Initially, she is in a secret relationship with fellow gymnast Carter, but they break up when she discovers his infidelity with her friend Lauren Tanner. Kaylie becomes the National Champion at Nationals, surpassing Kelly Parker. She develops anorexia as she becomes obsessed with losing weight to enhance her gymnastics performance. During the tryouts for the World's Team, she faints while performing on the balance beam and requires immediate hospitalization. Kaylie is selected for the team on the condition that she is medically fit to compete. While in rehab, she befriends a model named Maeve, who teaches her how to deceive the staff. However, when Maeve dies from anorexia-related heart failure, Kaylie realizes the severity of her condition and acknowledges that she needs help. Instead of speaking at Maeve's funeral, Kaylie performs a song with Damon in her honor. Upon being cleared to resume training, Kaylie rejoins The Rock and deliberates whether to disclose her eating disorder publicly. Eventually, she decides to share her story, although it receives criticism from an NGO. The team goes on to win gold at Worlds, and Kaylie enters into a relationship with Austin. Their relationship remains stable in Season 3 until Austin is cut from the men's team. He blames Kaylie for his performance and ends their relationship, leaving her heartbroken. Kaylie attempts to reconcile with Austin but finds his room empty, except for a box of items addressed to her. She realizes it's truly over between them and experiences deep sadness. However, Austin returns when Kaylie's drug test yields a positive result, jeopardizing her spot on the women's Olympic team. He comforts her, and they reconcile their differences. In the end, Wendy is removed from the Olympic team, granting Kaylie a place on the U.S. Olympic Women's Gymnastics team. Kaylie is the only character, aside from Payson, to appear in every episode.
- Ronnie Cruz (played by Rosa Blasi) is the mother of Leo and Kaylie. She had a successful singing career in the 1980s. Ronnie emphasizes to Kaylie the importance of not missing out on her dreams and advises her on love. She regrets not pursuing her own singing career further. Ronnie had an affair with Marty during his time as The Rock's coach, which led to her husband Alex moving out and filing for divorce. She co-manages Kaylie's press and displays a deep commitment to helping Kaylie during her battle with an eating disorder. Despite their troubled marriage, Ronnie and Alex still care for each other. Ronnie did not want a divorce, but she kept much of her feelings to herself and assured Kaylie it was for the best.
- Alex Cruz (played by Jason Manuel Olazabal) is the father of Leo and Kaylie, as well as a former baseball star. He initially manages Kaylie's career until she replaces him with MJ. Eventually, Kaylie rehires Alex and Ronnie as co-managers in hopes of reuniting them. Alex has always been actively involved in pushing Kaylie in gymnastics. Some speculate that his actions may have contributed to her development of an eating disorder, as he frequently monitored her weight using a scale in their living room during Season 1.
- Leo Cruz (played by Marcus Coloma) is Kaylie's older brother and a former gymnast. He is a college student but returns to Boulder to assist Sasha with coaching at The Rock. Leo is fiercely protective of Kaylie and physically confronts Carter when he learns of Carter's infidelity. He resumes his college studies in Season 2. Leo is popular among girls, and his presence at the gym captures their attention.

== Tanner family ==
- Lauren Tanner (played by Cassie Scerbo) is a gymnast at The Rock, known for her nickname "The Queen of the Beam." Many events throughout the series establish her as a selfish, conniving villain character, willing to do anything to undermine her rivals and maintain her status. As such she has a reputation for being snobbish and often responds with sharp remarks. In the early episodes, she displays snobbish behavior towards Emily and intentionally embarrasses her father in front of her grandmother, Chloe Kmetko, and Emily. Lauren becomes involved with Kaylie's boyfriend, Carter, and they have a sexual relationship, resulting in the loss of her virginity at a party. Following Carter and Kaylie's breakup, Lauren and Carter continue their involvement, but she eventually ends the relationship and gets him expelled from the gym due to his inability to express love for her given her manipulative tendencies. Her mother, who is a substance abuser, abandoned Lauren and her father when she was young, which may have influenced Lauren's behavior. After her mother's death, Lauren discovers that her mother had attempted to see her multiple times just to say goodbye, but her father always prevented it. As a result, Lauren briefly moves in with Summer. Lauren and Payson initially compete against each other for the captaincy but ultimately become co-captains. During Olympic training, Lauren experiences episodes of dizziness and blackouts. She consults a doctor, who diagnoses her with a heart condition. Payson is aware of this and urges Lauren to be honest, but Lauren refuses, fearing it may jeopardize her place on the team. Payson, concerned about Lauren's safety, reveals the truth to Coach McIntire while Lauren prepares for a beam routine. In the hospital, an angry Lauren blames Payson for the situation and declares she never wants to see her again. In an attempt to reconcile, Payson persuades a renowned surgeon to perform a risky operation on Lauren. The operation is successful, and although McIntire and her father doubt Lauren's ability to make the team, she is determined to train. After recovering sufficiently, she participates in the Olympic trials. During the trials, Lauren discovers that Wendy has been drugging Kaylie. Ultimately, Lauren secures one of the five spots on the London Olympic team, reaffirming her title as "Queen of the Beam" alongside her three close friends.
- Steve Tanner (played by Anthony Starke) is Lauren's father and the former manager of The Rock. Steve, a wealthy lawyer, consistently strives to provide the best for his daughter, even when she does not deserve it. He has been engaged to Summer van Horne on two occasions, but their relationship ends when Summer discovers that Steve had threatened Lauren's mother not to attend Nationals. Steve's second relationship with Summer begins after Sasha leaves The Rock but collapses when Summer learns that Steve concealed the fact that Lauren had sent an edited video of Payson kissing Sasha, protecting Lauren from consequences at the expense of Sasha's career. Summer cuts ties with them completely, expressing her desire to have no further involvement with them. However, she later visits Lauren to offer comfort during her heart condition and seeks reconciliation with both of them.
- Leslie Tanner is Lauren's mother and Steve's former wife. Leslie struggled with drug addiction and abandoned Lauren twice during her childhood, which contributed to Lauren's bitterness as a teenager. Despite attempting to visit Lauren annually, Leslie was prevented by Steve, who threatened her with arrest if she were to see Lauren, despite knowing how desperately Lauren desired to see her mother. Steve also prevented Leslie from attending Nationals, causing Lauren to believe that her mother never truly loved her. Leslie dies in Season 2 in a car accident while tearfully driving away from The Rock, suppressing her urge to see Lauren. Lauren eventually discovers that Steve had kept her mother away from her, leading her to leave him in anger and temporarily seek refuge with Summer. During a competition at Nationals, Lauren dedicates her bar routine to her mother's memory, realizing that her mother truly loved her all along.

== The Pizza Shack ==
- Damon Young (played by Johnny Pacar) is a member of the band Shelter Pups, an aspiring songwriter, and a friend of Razor. During Razor's absence from The Pizza Shack, Damon fills in for him and develops a close relationship with Emily. They begin a secret relationship and later take their connection to a deeper level, resulting in Emily losing her virginity. Due to unprotected intercourse, Emily discovers she is pregnant. Although she expresses her desire to form a family with Damon and their baby, she temporarily flees to Las Vegas upon learning that Damon and Kaylie kissed during their period of separation. Damon eventually follows her to reconcile and hopes to build a family with their unborn child.
- Razor (played by Nico Tortorella) is Emily's colleague at The Pizza Shack and serves as the lead singer of the band Shelter Pups. While Razor is away on tour as a roadie, he asks Damon to fill in for him at The Pizza Shack and keep an eye on Emily. Upon his return, Razor is surprised to learn about Emily and Damon's romantic involvement, but he continues to be a supportive friend to both of them.

== Other characters ==
- Austin Tucker (played by Zane Holtz) is the men's Olympic champion. He begins training at The Rock, inspired by how dedicated the Rock girls are. He and Kaylie don't get along because she doesn't want Payson and Emily to get distracted by boys and the drama they seem to create. He later invites the girls to a party at his lake house. Lauren, Payson, Emily, and Kaylie all go despite promising not to. Austin and Kaylie kiss at his party after he comforts her. He also notices Kaylie becoming thinner and tries to stop her anorexia because his younger sister had problems because of an eating disorder. He eventually brings it up to her parents, and Kaylie asks him why he's doing this. He admits he cares for her, yet he doesn't know why. When Kaylie faints on the beam during the Worlds tryouts, he catches her. He begins to date her throughout Season 3, but later, when he is cut from the men's team, he blames her for his cut and breaks up with her. The two patch things up when he comes to comfort Kaylie when her drug test comes back positive for a banned substance just before the Olympic trials.
- Max Spencer (played by Joshua Bowman) is a new gymnast in The Rock. He first appeared as a photographer friend of Austin. Austin later revealed that Max is a gymnast and wants to train in Denver or at The Rock. In the end, he chooses to train at the Rock. Max has shown an interest in Payson, but when Payson tells him over and over that she is only focused on gymnastics, he starts dating Lauren. In the episode "What Lies Beneath", Max comes out as bisexual to Austin and then kisses him as a result of Payson telling him that she loves him. Later in that episode of the second season, Max meets Payson after Worlds and tells her he loves her, and they hug. In Season 3, Max breaks up with Payson by letter, saying he needed to "find" himself and that he loved her, breaking Payson's heart. Lauren hints that he is in the Hamptons, which is a play on the fact that Josh Bowman left the show to star in Revenge (TV series), another show that is set in the Hamptons.
- Marty Walsh (played by Erik Palladino) is the former coach of The Rock and a three-time Olympic gold medalist. He leaves the club after Steve Tanner blackmails him with information about his affair with Ronnie Cruz. Marty begins coaching at the Denver Elite Gymnastics Club, where his top gymnast is Kelly Parker. Although the national team trains at The Rock, Marty is named their coach. He is fired from the national team by Ellen Beals after he tells her to stop bullying Emily during practice. Marty really liked Emily, and he cared for all of the gymnasts. He was very sad to leave the Rock, but he fibbed and said it was because he liked Denver more, which was not true.
- Carter Anderson (played by Zachary Burr Abel) is Kaylie's ex-boyfriend and former gymnast at The Rock, currently training at Denver Elite. He had sex with Lauren after she lost her virginity after a fight with Kaylie, but did not tell Kaylie about the affair out of fear that she'd break up with him. He later gave Kaylie a necklace that had belonged to his late mother. When his relationship with Kaylie is revealed at a party, he argues with Kaylie's dad about who loves Kaylie more. He stands up for Kaylie, refusing to name the girl he's involved with Sasha, and is subsequently suspended from the Rock and banned from Nationals. He later reveals his affair with Lauren, causing Kaylie to break up with him. Carter shows great resentment towards Lauren, blaming her for everything that happened between him and Kaylie. However, after being kicked out of his home, he is forced to live in Lauren's attic, and he grows less hostile towards her. He continues to try to win Kaylie back, using it as motivation to get his act back together. The two share a kiss, but Kaylie then discovers that Lauren and Carter are still in contact and that Carter has been living in Lauren's house. He kisses Lauren in the episode "Are We Family". He becomes Lauren's boyfriend after he and Kaylie break up. He breaks up with Lauren after she steals Emily's floor routine, and afterwards he tells her that the reason he could never tell her he loves her is because she purposely does things that hurt other people for her own personal gain. When their relationship becomes public, he is kicked out of The Rock and begins training at Denver Elite.
- Nicky Russo (played by Cody Longo) is a former gymnast at The Rock and winner of the men's silver medal at Nationals. He is extremely dedicated to his sport and considers any time not spent working on his routines as time wasted. He has feelings for Payson; he helps her obtain cortisone illegally for her back, and they share a kiss in "California Girls". Nicky's agent hopes to pair him with Kaylie as a "power couple" in gymnastics. First, Kaylie and Nicky hated each other. He always liked Payson. Although Nicky and Kaylie share several moments of sexual tension, he eventually decides to move to Denver to escape the Rock drama.
- Kelly Parker (played by Nicole Gale Anderson) is the former national champion, who trains at Denver Elite. Before Payson's injury, Kelly and Payson were serious rivals. Kelly makes fun of all of the Rock girls, especially Emily. At the Nationals, Kelly placed second behind Kaylie Cruz. She is the first to notice how dangerously thin Kaylie is becoming and decides to befriend her to learn more about her weight, hoping to expose Kaylie's eating disorder, but eventually develops a less hostile relationship with her. She bonds with the girls at the Olympic training center but loses her place on the Olympic team. When her mother, Sheila, makes noise about this being a case of discrimination (since Jordan was kept and is black, the same skin color as the coach), Kelly snaps that she's quitting gymnastics to find a new path in life and "fires" Sheila as her mother. She shows up at the Olympic tryouts to support the girls.
- MJ Martin (played by Marsha Thomason) is a sports agent who agrees to represent Kaylie. A former tennis star, she now works for one of the major sports agencies in America. She and Sasha previously had a relationship when Sasha was a young gymnast, and they still make references to the relationship. MJ initially wanted to represent Payson, but Payson's parents would not allow it. Kaylie asked MJ to represent her, but MJ said no until Kaylie proved she really wanted to succeed in gymnastics. MJ tries to portray Nicky and Kaylie as a golden couple, much to the two's annoyance.
- Ellen Beals (played by Michelle Clunie) is part of the National Committee. She doesn't like Sasha and wants to get rid of him. Also, she is shown to dislike Emily in many episodes. After the National Committee fires Marty Walsh, she takes over as coach of the National Team. She turns in evidence incriminating Sasha to the national committee, which is the edited video tape of Payson kissing him. After the original tape resurfaces, she comes under inquiry by the national committee, which causes her to lose her credibility and influence with the committee. In Season 3, although she never makes an appearance again, she is mentioned a lot throughout the season, particularly in the episode "Time is of the Essence."
- Coach MacIntire (played by Dondre Whitfield) is the U.S. women's gymnastics coach. At first, he is very hard on girls, telling them how bad they are and always yelling at them when they mess up. He also pairs the girls up: Kelly and Kaylie, Payson with Lauren, and Jordan with Wendy. Payson goes to the NGO and tells them Coach MacIntire is too hard on them and the girls are getting worse, not improving. He holds a meeting where he and the girls make peace. The girls begin to warm up to him.
- Jordan Randall (played by Chelsea Tavares) is a gymnast who pushes her way into the Olympic training center. She had been a former teammate of Kaylie at a camp, but the two had a falling out as Jordan refused to let Kaylie train with her. While Coach McIntire is wary at first, he's soon impressed by her skills on a videotape and lets her try out for the team. There is tension between Jordan and the other girls, who suspect her of being the "mole" in the team. She and Kaylie manage to patch up their differences while being forced to live together. When the two's former coach comes to the center to train, Jordan is tense around him and erupts when she learns the coach is having private sessions with Wendy. She goes to confront him at his hotel, and after being turned away, she smashes up his car. Kaylie talks to her as Jordan confesses that the coach has been molesting her for years, starting at camp. This is the reason she cut Kaylie off, so she wouldn't suffer the same fate and risk being sexually assaulted as well. Kaylie tells Jordan she can help her expose the truth, and they run off as the police arrive to check the damaged car. Kaylie tells Coach McIntire this, but Jordan refuses to confirm it, afraid no one will believe her. Kaylie takes to the Internet to discover that other girls have been molested as well, and the coach is arrested. She is one of the five girls chosen for the official Olympic team.
- Wendy Capshaw (played by Amanda Leighton) is a gymnast chosen to take part in the Olympic training with the Rock girls. She appears to be an incredibly perky and always cheerful girl who constantly talks and annoys the others with her happy attitude and seemingly naive outlook on life. She turns out to be the "mole," giving information to Kelly's mother, Sheila, to tell the coach and hurt the team. When the girls discover this, an angry Kelly "fires" Sheila as her mother, and Sheila confronts Wendy about how the girl knew this would backfire on Sheila. Wendy not only confirms this but reveals that her entire perky attitude is all an act as she plans to "take those rock girls down" and be a champion on her own. She nearly gets away with drugging Kaylie, but Lauren, knowing she couldn't be up to any good, finds out about her plan and exposes her. She is subsequently kicked off the team and is never seen again.
- Jake (played by Russell Pitts) is a wrestler who takes a special interest in Lauren. He calls the gymnasts Barbie dolls. He thinks that the gymnasts are just girls and are not strong like him and his team of wrestlers. Lauren proves him wrong. Jake hides Otis, a big gold head that the teams try to get. Whoever ends up with him wins. The wrestlers do whatever they can to make sure they get Otis and that the gymnasts don't.
- Rigo (played by Tom Maden) is introduced in the third season as a BMX rider at the USA Training Center. Lauren inadvertently introduces Rigo to Payson, and the two start dating thereafter. Rigo is there for Payson, taking her to see Dr. Walker for Lauren's heart condition and even reaching out to Sasha because he knew Payson needed Sasha's support. Payson loses her virginity to Rigo in the episode "Listen to the Universe", and he meets her parents in the finale "United Stakes".
