= John Swihart =

American composer

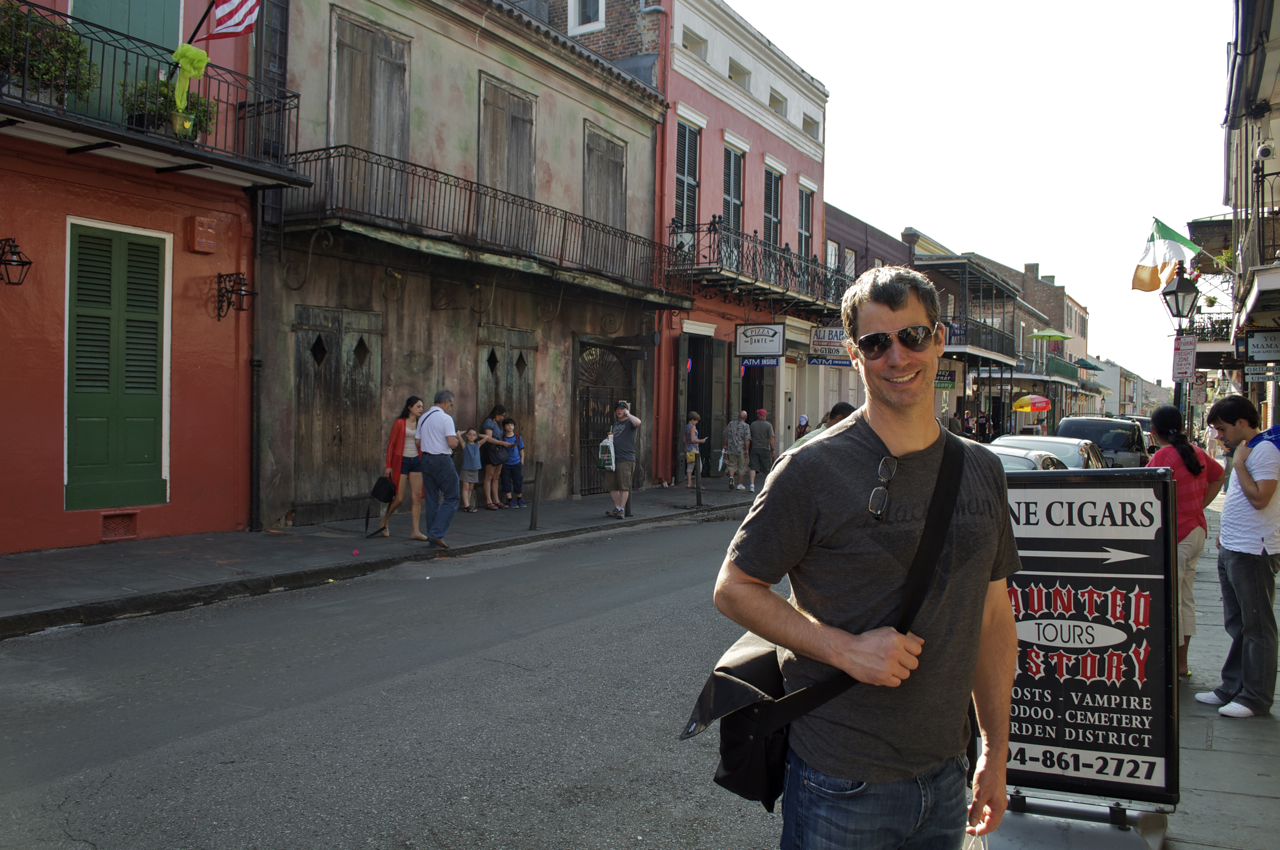
- Occupation: Composer
- Website: http://www.johnswihart.com

John Swihart is an American musical composer for film and television. He is perhaps best known for his score to Napoleon Dynamite, Youth in Revolt, Employee of the Month, and his music for the TV shows How I Met Your Mother, and Go On.

John Swihart was raised in Bloomington, Indiana, the son of a physicist based at Indiana University. He spent a portion of his formative years in Europe and Asia, where his father would sabbatical.

Swihart had some musical training at a very young age but was not deeply absorbed by music until he was about eight. Swihart would leave Indiana to attend Berklee College of Music, in Boston. He graduated in 1986.

Swihart played Chapman Stick, bass, guitar and zither in the Boston, New York, and Las Vegas Blue Man Group shows, on his way to Los Angeles. His breakout film project Napoleon Dynamite premiered at the Sundance Film Festival in 2004.

== Works ==
=== Films ===
==== 2000s ====
Year	Title	Director	Notes
2002	When Boys Fly	Stewart Halpern-Fingerhut; Lenid Rolov	—N/a
2002	Bedford Springs	Marc Berlin	—N/a
2004	Napoleon Dynamite	Jared Hess	—N/a
2004	Purgatory House	Cindy Baer	—N/a
2004	The Least Likely Candidate	Will Hartman	—N/a
2005	The Great New Wonderful	Danny Leiner	—N/a
2005	Mall Cop	David Greenspan	—N/a
2005	Life on the Ledge	Lewis Helfer	—N/a
2005	Our Very Own	Cameron Watson	—N/a
2005	Nadine in Date Land	Amie Steir	Television film
2005	Daltry Calhoun	Katrina Holden Bronson	—N/a
2006	One Last Dance	Max Makowski	—N/a
2006	The Sasquatch Gang	Tim Skousen	—N/a
2006	Champions	David Wike	—N/a
2006	Bickford Shmeckler's Cool Ideas	Scott Lew	—N/a
2006	Think Tank	Brian Petersen	—N/a
2006	5up 2down	Steven Kessler	—N/a
2006	Employee of the Month	Greg Coolidge	—N/a
2007	Full of It	Christian Charles	—N/a
2007	The Hammer	Charles Herman-Wurmfeld	—N/a
2007	The Education of Charlie Banks	Fred Durst	—N/a
2007	The Brothers Solomon	Bob Odenkirk	—N/a
2007	Randy and the Mob	Ray McKinnon	—N/a
2007	South of Pico	Ernst Gossner	—N/a
2008	The Last Word	Geoffrey Haley	—N/a
2008	The Year of Getting to Know Us	Patrick Sisam	—N/a
2008	Just Add Water	Hart Bochner	—N/a
2008	Garden Party	Jason Freeland	—N/a
2008	HottieBoombaLottie	Seth Packard	—N/a
2009	Balls Out: Gary the Tennis Coach	Danny Leiner	—N/a
2009	Spread	David Mackenzie	—N/a
2009	Finding Bliss	Julie Davis	—N/a
2009	New in Town	Jonas Elmer	—N/a
2009	Youth in Revolt	Miguel Arteta	—N/a
2009	The Other Woman	Don Roos	—N/a
2009	Splinterheads	Brant Sersen	—N/a
2009	The Strip	Jameel Khan	—N/a
2009	Operating Instructions	Andy Tennant	Television film

==== 2010s ====
Year	Title	Director	Notes
2010	The Perfect Host	Nicholas Tomnay	—N/a
2010	Hey Watch This	Christian Charles	—N/a
2011	Flypaper	Rob Minkoff	—N/a
2011	Losing Control	Valerie Weiss	—N/a
2011	Lucky	Gil Cates Jr.	—N/a
2012	For a Good Time, Call...	Jamie Travis	—N/a
2012	Love Sick Love	Christian Charles	—N/a
2013	Odd Thomas	Stephen Sommers	—N/a
2014	The Young Kieslowski	Kerem Sanga	—N/a
2014	As Night Comes	Richard Zelniker	—N/a
2015	Accidental Love	Stephen Greene	—N/a
2015	Staten Island Summer	Rhys Thomas	—N/a
2015	A Light Beneath Their Feet	Valerie Weiss	—N/a
2016	First Girl I Loved	Kerem Sanga	—N/a
2017	Table 19	Jeffrey Blitz	—N/a
2017	A Symphony of Hope	Brian Weidling	—N/a
2017	Angry Angel	Jamie Travis	Television film
2018	Ideal Home	Andrew Fleming	Composed with Martin Simpson
2018	Haunting on Fraternity Row	Brant Sersen	—N/a
2019	The Fanatic	Fred Durst	—N/a
2019	The Fan Connection	Mary Wall	—N/a
2019	The Turkey Bowl	Greg Coolidge	—N/a

==== 2020s ====
Year	Title	Director	Notes
2020	Dinner in America	Adam Rehmeier	—N/a
2020	The Bay of Silence	Paula van der Oest	—N/a

=== Television series ===
Year	Title	Notes
2004	The Drive	—N/a
2005	Home Blitz	—N/a
2005–2014	How I Met Your Mother	—N/a
2006	Trick My Truck	—N/a
2006	Shorty McShorts' Shorts	Episode: "My Mom Married a Yeti"
2007	Trick My Trucker	—N/a
2007–2011	Greek	—N/a
2008	Fear Itself	Episode: "Community"
2008	Ski Patrol	2 episodes
2008	Ski Patrol	2 episodes
2009–2010	Accidentally on Purpose	—N/a
2010	Sons of Tucson	—N/a
2010–2011	Backwash	—N/a
2011	Mad Love	—N/a
2011	Pretty Tough	—N/a
2011–2012	How to Be a Gentleman	—N/a
2011–2015	Web Therapy	—N/a
2011–2017	Switched at Birth	—N/a
2012	The Booth at the End	—N/a
2012–2013	Go On	—N/a
2012–2014	Men at Work	—N/a
2013	The Goodwin Games	—N/a
2013	We Are Men	—N/a
2014	Cristela	—N/a
2014–2015	Red Band Society	—N/a
2016	The Great Indoors	—N/a
2017–2018	Trial & Error	—N/a
2018	Break a Hip	—N/a
2018	American Woman	Composed with Michael Suby

=== Video game ===
Year	Title	Notes
2019	Far Cry New Dawn	Composed with Tyler Bates

== Awards and nominations ==
- Golden Satellite Award (2004) for best original score (Napoleon Dynamite)
- Grammy Nomination (2006) for best compilation soundtrack album for motion picture, television or other visual media (Napoleon Dynamite)
