= List of Make It or Break It episodes =

Make It or Break It is an American television drama series which premiered on June 22, 2009 on ABC Family. Set in the world of elite gymnastics, the series follows a group of teen Olympic hopefuls as they train and prepare for their day in the spotlight. The show was picked up for an additional 10 episodes on July 27, 2009, which started airing on January 4, 2010, bringing the number of episodes in the first season to 20.

On January 12, 2010, ABC Family announced that the show was picked up for a second season, which premiered on June 28, 2010 at 10 p.m. ET. Starting on July 13, 2010, new episodes followed Pretty Little Liars. The second mid-season finale aired on August 31, 2010 and the second half of Season 2 premiered on March 28, 2011 and ended on May 23, 2011. It was announced via Twitter from Executive Producer Holly Sorensen that the series is cancelled. The series finale aired on May 14, 2012.

A total of 48 episodes of Make It or Break It have been produced and aired over three seasons, between June 22, 2009 and May 14, 2012.

== Series overview ==
Season	Episodes		Originally released	
Season	Episodes		First released	Last released
1	20	10	June 22, 2009	August 24, 2009
1	20	10	January 4, 2010	March 8, 2010
2	20	10	June 28, 2010	August 31, 2010
2	20	10	March 28, 2011	May 23, 2011
3	8		March 26, 2012	May 14, 2012

== Episodes ==
=== Season 1 (2009–10) ===
No. overall	No. in season	Title	Directed by	Written by	Original release date	U.S. viewers (millions)
Part 1
1	1	"Pilot"	Steve Miner	Holly Sorensen	June 22, 2009	2.50
A young gymnast named Emily with dreams of Olympic glory shakes up the status quo at a training facility in Colorado named "The Rock".
2	2	"Where's Marty?"	Steve Miner	Holly Sorensen	June 29, 2009	N/A
The exit of Coach Marty, one of "The Rock's" top guns, Lauren, and their 4th place through 7th place girls causes chaos at the gym, prompting Payson, Kaylie, and Emily (with Becca in tow) to head for Denver with a plan to confront them about their defection.
3	3	"Blowing Off Steam"	Steve Miner	Michael Gans & Richard Register	July 6, 2009	N/A
To blow off some steam before they begin their new workout routine with the new coach, Kaylie, Emily and Payson decide to go to a high-school party. Meanwhile, Lauren's birthday dinner is ruined by Summer's surprise appearance.
4	4	"Sunday, Bloody Sasha, Sunday"	Norman Buckley	Joanna Johnson	July 13, 2009	N/A
The girls are put through a punishing training session on their day off by Sasha for attending the keg party. Meanwhile, Lauren and Summer are accompanied by Steve to the church, where Steve is impressed by Summer's decision of remaining a virgin till marriage.
5	5	"Like Mother, Like Daughter, Like Supermodel"	David Paymer	Amy Turner	July 20, 2009	N/A
To fund the team for the National Championship, The Rock decides to hold a mother-daughter fashion show in order to raise funds. Meanwhile, Kaylie makes an important decision regarding her relationship with Carter.
6	6	"Between a Rock and a Hard Place"	Michael W. Watkins	Doug Stockstill	July 27, 2009	1.88
Emily tries a difficult movement in front of Sasha and finds out that, although she has natural talent, she is inconsistent and should stick to something simple.
7	7	"Run, Emily, Run"	Fred Gerber	Kerry Lenhart & John J. Sakmar	August 3, 2009	2.10
Sasha's refusal to welcome Emily back to the Rock has her at a loss as to what to do other than to keep training. Fortunately, her Pizza Shack co-worker, Damon, has an idea on how she can do just that - at the Rock.
8	8	"All's Fair in Love, War and Gymnastics"	Chris Grismer	Michael Gans & Richard Register	August 10, 2009	1.91
A send-off party for the team going to the Nationals is hosted by the Cruz family. Payson seeks pain medication from Nick, without seeking her mother's consent. Lauren is determined to cause trouble in Kaylie and Carter's relationship.
9	9	"Where's Kaylie?"	Ron Underwood	Joanna Johnson	August 17, 2009	2.31
Ronnie sets up a meeting between the smitten pair. Carter confesses the truth about his infidelity to Kaylie, after which she runs away.
10	10	"All That Glitters"	Patrick Norris	Holly Sorensen	August 24, 2009	2.40
It is the National Championships in Boston and the girls' hard work and training are put to the test. Payson desperately wants to win, but suffers from acute back pain; doubt about the performance slowly creeps into Emily's mind.
Part 2
11	11	"The Eleventh Hour"	Norman Buckley	Kerry Lenhart & John J. Sakmar	January 4, 2010	2.70
Kaylie discovers that being a national champion is about more than just celebrating, Payson struggles to deal with her back injury, and Damon plans a romantic evening with Emily.
12	12	"Follow the Leader"	Chris Grismer	Joanna Johnson	January 11, 2010	2.08
Marty is named coach of the National team. The girls are upset by the news, so they try to get him ousted. Meanwhile, Sasha finds a new way for Payson to fit in at the gym and Kaylie confronts Carter about his betrayal.
13	13	"California Girls"	David Paymer	Story by : Doug Stockstill; Teleplay by : Holly Sorensen	January 18, 2010	2.37
Kaylie heads to California to attend an A-list party, and the rest of the girls tag along. While there, Payson consults a prominent back specialist. Elsewhere, Chloe tries Internet dating, and someone secretly houses a homeless Carter.
14	14	"Are We Having Fun Yet?"	Michael Robison	Amy Turner	January 25, 2010	2.30
Payson's life is about to get harder when she has to become a regular high school student after being home schooled all her life. With the chaos at school, Payson feels like a loser and becomes the new target for the school queen bee.
15	15	"Loves Me, Loves Me Not"	Fred Gerber	Michael Gans & Richard Register	February 1, 2010	2.16
Romance is in the air at The Rock for the gymnasts and the parents as Valentine's Day arrives, the girls have to face the ones they love. Payson receives flowers from her new friend at school. Song featured: 'Matter of Time' by Stacy Clark
16	16	"Save the Last Dance"	Helen Shaver	Kerry Lenhart & John J. Sakmar	February 8, 2010	2.29
The girls all attend the prom at Payson's school, and Emily unexpectedly sees Damon there. Meanwhile, Lauren discovers that her dad is dating Chloe, and Carter tries to reconnect with Kaylie.
17	17	"Hope and Faith"	Chris Grismer	Doug Stockstill	February 15, 2010	2.22
Emily finds out that her mother is dating Steve after Lauren confronts Chloe. Meanwhile, Payson has an appointment with a top-ranked back surgeon, and the National Team must prove their worth and step up their game.
18	18	"The Great Wall"	Guy Bee	Joanna Johnson	February 22, 2010	2.05
Sasha goes over the National Team Committee's heads and invites the Chinese National team to The Rock. Note: Due to Lauren competing in Beijing, this is the only episode in which Cassie Scerbo does not appear.
19	19	"The Only Thing We Have to Fear..."	Norman Buckley	Michael Gans & Richard Register	March 1, 2010	2.14
Kaylie is torn about whether to compete with her team in the upcoming Chinese Invitational or listen to the National Committee and MJ, who tell her to back out of the meet.
20	20	"Are We Family?"	Michael Lange	Holly Sorensen	March 8, 2010	2.50
Kaylie decides that she will not compete in the invitational after catching Lauren and Carter embracing. Meanwhile, the Chinese team arrives at Boulder with their star gymnast, the sensational Genji Cho.

=== Season 2 (2010–11) ===
No. overall	No. in season	Title	Directed by	Written by	Original release date	U.S. viewers (millions)
Part 1
21	1	"Friends Close, Enemies Closer"	Patrick Norris	Joanna Johnson	June 28, 2010	1.83
The girls beat the Chinese gymnastic team at a club meet after defying the National Committee and are labelled as the Rock Rebels. Payson tries to push herself for a comeback but Sasha feels she is not ready yet. The girls pose for a magazine cover.
22	2	"All or Nothing"	Fred Gerber	Kerry Lenhart & John J. Sakmar	July 5, 2010	1.72
The girls travel to France to take part in an important competition. Emily is afraid of making efforts to see Damon as it might affect her scholarship. Payson hopes to get included in the national team again. Lauren plots against Emily.
23	3	"Battle of the Flexes"	J. Miller Tobin	Amy Turner	July 13, 2010	1.56
Olympic champion Austin Tucker begins training there while sparking a competition between male and female athletes for gym space. Meanwhile, Kaylie gifts promise rings to Emily and Payson to remind them of their goal for the Olympics.
24	4	"And the Rocky Goes To..."	Bethany Rooney	Holly Sorensen	July 20, 2010	1.46
Lauren campaigns for the most popular girl award at the annual Rock banquet. Chloe decides to give Lauren a run for her money and helps campaign for Emily. At the banquet, Kaylie discovers her parents' divorce papers.
25	5	"I Won't Dance, Don't Ask Me"	David Paymer	Michael Gans & Richard Register	July 27, 2010	1.66
As the National Committee is close to selecting the world team, it is up to Kaylie, Lauren, and Emily to perfect their floor routines. Payson has problems with the new role. Lauren worries about Carter's feelings for her.
26	6	"Party Gone Out of Bounds"	Felix Alcala	Joanna Johnson	August 3, 2010	1.75
Austin plans a party at his lake house and invites the girls over. Summer and Sasha try hard to keep their first official date a secret. After spending the night with Steve, Chloe is caught by Lauren, leaving the Tanners' house.
27	7	"What Are You Made Of?"	Glenn L. Steelman	Holly Sorensen	August 10, 2010	1.56
Sasha and Summer prepare the Rock to host the National Team's last practise before the team is narrowed down by the Committee for Worlds. Lauren begs Chloe not to tell her dad about finding her and Carter.
28	8	"Rock Bottom"	Chris Grismer	Liz Maccie	August 17, 2010	1.30
Kim decides to run for President of the Parents Board, but Mark is against the idea. Meanwhile, Austin tells Kaylie that he is concerned because his sister had an eating disorder and he can recognise the signs in her.
29	9	"If Only..."	David Paymer	Michael Gans & Richard Register	August 24, 2010	1.42
Emily is bailed out of jail by Razor. Lauren's mother returns with hopes of reconciliation. Damon surprises Emily and together, they go on a date.
30	10	"At the Edge of the Worlds"	Chris Grismer	Kerry Lenhart & John J. Sakmar	August 31, 2010	1.44
Sasha is suspended until further notice and Ellen Beals takes his place as the girls' coach. Meanwhile, the world team trials date has been moved forward and now clashes with Emily's court appearance. Guest Star: Béla Károlyi as Sasha's father, Dmitri
Part 2
31	11	"The New Normal"	Michael Lange	Holly Sorensen	March 28, 2011	2.06
Kaylie is in therapy for her eating disorder. Emily is allowed to compete with certain restrictions. Kim tries to find Sasha before he quits the gym and heads to Romania. Lauren and Payson prepare for a gymnastics exhibition.
32	12	"Free People"	Fred Gerber	Joanna Johnson	April 4, 2011	1.69
Kaylie is tired with rehab, so she tries a quick way out. Darby Conrad is introduced as the new Rock Coach by Steve, although Payson is skeptical of his capabilities. Emily is added back to the national team.
33	13	"The Buddy System"	Glenn L. Steelman	Amy Turner	April 11, 2011	1.64
Due to their co-captain status, Payson and Lauren do not get along well. Darby forces them to swap exercises so they can spend more time together. A surprise awaits in Lauren's computer for Steve.
34	14	"Life or Death"	David Paymer	Michael Gans & Richard Register	April 18, 2011	1.58
Instead of the Dallas team, The Rock girls will now compete against the Pinewood Club, one of the worst-ranked gymnastics teams ever, much to the girls' dismay. Meanwhile, Kaylie finds solace in music after Maeve's death.
35	15	"Hungary Heart"	Rod Hardy	Kerry Lenhart & John J. Sakmar	April 25, 2011	1.64
After the embarrassing loss to Pinewood Payson, Emily, and Lauren are headed to compete in Hungary with a more stern Darby as their coach. Steve warns Darby that if she can't handle the girls, the NGO will take action. Note: Chelsea Hobbs, who portrays Emily, gave birth two days after this episode aired.
36	16	"Requiem for a Dream"	Michael Schultz	Holly Sorensen	May 2, 2011	1.65
Sasha returns as the girls' coach. Emily discovers that she is pregnant, which could potentially affect her gymnastics career. Steve proposes to Summer after Lauren pressurises him. A record label loves the song Damon and Kaylie wrote together. Note: This is the last episode in which Chelsea Hobbs appears, although she retains her billing in the opening credits for the rest of the season. This is also the last episode to be written by series creator Holly Sorensen.
37	17	"To Thine Own Self Be True"	John Behring	Liz Maccie	May 9, 2011	1.51
When Emily runs away, Kaylie feels responsible while Damon searches for her. Sasha introduces Kelly Parker to the press as Emily's replacement. Steve proposes to Summer for marriage which she accepts.
38	18	"Dog Eat Dog"	Chris Grismer	Michael Gans & Richard Register	May 16, 2011	1.64
An abandoned puppy is rescued by Max and Payson. Kelly's manager, Sheila, arrives at The Rock. Sasha gives Kelly another shot at earning her place in the team.
39	19	"What Lies Beneath"	David Paymer	Joanna Johnson	May 23, 2011	1.49
Sheila, Kelly Parker's mother, continues to have an overbearing presence at the Rock. Sheila tells Kelly that she must expose Kaylie's anorexia now that Kaylie has made the World Team. Note: This episode and "Worlds Apart" were aired as one 2-hour episode.
40	20	"Worlds Apart"	Michael Schultz	Kerry Lenhart & John J. Sakmar	May 23, 2011	1.49
The Rock girls are accompanied by Sasha to Rio de Janeiro for the World Championships where their performance suffers due to their holding personal grudges against each other. Note: This episode and "What Lies Beneath" were aired as one 2-hour episode.

=== Season 3 (2012) ===
The series was renewed for a third season on September 16, 2011. It premiered on March 26, 2012.

No. overall	No. in season	Title	Directed by	Written by	Original release date	U.S. viewers (millions)
41	1	"Smells Like Winner"	Michael Schultz	Kerry Lenhart & John J. Sakmar	March 26, 2012	1.57
Payson, Kaylie, and Lauren arrive at the US training centre in Colorado Springs to spend eight weeks training with other Olympic hopefuls. The girls say goodbye to Sasha and their parents and meet Coach McIntire, their new trainer, for the first time.
42	2	"It Takes Two"	Michael Lange	Amy Turner	April 2, 2012	1.17
Coach McIntire partners the girls up to train and live together in pairs. Payson is dismayed to be teamed with Lauren, while Wendy is paired with Jordan and Kelly Parker with Kaylie. Their first assignment is to choreograph a routine for each other, but Kelly and Kaylie struggle to establish trust between them, while Lauren is upset by Payson's lack of motivation.
43	3	"Time is of the Essence"	Jonathan Frakes	Liz Maccie	April 9, 2012	1.10
A journalist upsets Payson by questioning her about the Sasha kissing scandal. Meanwhile, Coach McIntire and the gymnasts who feel uninspired by his tactics and are doubtful about his ability to coach a female team. Sensing their discontent, McIntire invites the team to his home to have a heart-to-heart and realises that he needs to take a different approach with their training.
44	4	"Growing Pains"	David Paymer	Mary Hanes & Ken Hanes	April 16, 2012	1.22
Coach McIntire expects the girls' routines to be perfect when they give an exhibition for a visit by their parents. Sheila makes an attempt to buy her daughter's place as team leader for the London games, and Kaylie invites Austin to dinner. Meanwhile, Payson is upset when her father announces that the family is moving.
45	5	"Dream On"	Steve Miner	Andrea Conway Kagey	April 23, 2012	1.11
Payson suffers the consequences when she breaks Coach McIntire's strict curfew to sneak out and see Rigo. As the first day of qualification rounds begin, Sheila attempts to undermine Jordan's confidence. Meanwhile, Kelly Parker is annoyed to discover that her mother is now working as Wendy's manager. Payson tells out the truth about Lauren, with terrible consequences for their friendship.
46	6	"Listen to the Universe"	Glenn Steelman	Michael Gans & Richard Register	April 30, 2012	0.90
Payson talks Kaylie into resolving her disagreement with Jordan, while Coach McIntire questions Jordan about her lack of team spirit. Elsewhere, Lauren is informed that she needs open heart surgery, followed by several months of rest before she can return to training. So, Payson enlists Rigo to take her on a trip by motorcycle to find a doctor who has pioneered a new, non-invasive procedure that could help Lauren.
47	7	"Truth Be Told"	Bethany Rooney	Liz Maccie & Andrea Conway Kagey	May 7, 2012	1.09
Lauren undergoes an experimental, non-invasive heart procedure, but her need for recovery time means that she is still unable to train. When Jake helps her to rehearse her routines mentally, he and Lauren form a close bond. Meanwhile, Jordan becomes anxious and loses her focus when Coach Ray arrives at the training centre to choreograph the floor routines.
48	8	"United Stakes"	Michael Schultz	Kerry Lenhart & John J. Sakmar	May 14, 2012	1.29
Kaylie and Payson try to encourage Jordan to report the truth about Coach Ray. Meanwhile, Wendy's devious actions result in Kaylie being banned from trials after failing her drug-screening test. Elsewhere, nervous about making it through her routine without her irregular heartbeat causing problems, Lauren must weigh her recovery against her Olympic dreams.
