= Christmas in Paradise =

- Written by: Matt Dorff; Coraly Santaliz; Alejandro Berrios
- Directed by: Sheldon Larry
- Starring: Charlotte Ross; Colin Ferguson; Devon Werkheiser; Josie Loren; Kenton Duty; Aria Wallace
- Music by: Dave Resnik; Luis Marin
- Country of origin: United States
- Original language: English

Production
- Producers: Sarah Soboleski; Brenda Friend; Bill O'Dowd; Matt Dorff; Michael Espensen; Carlos Vazquez; Jose Gilberto Molinari-Rosaly
- Cinematography: P.J. López
- Editor: Nick Link
- Running time: 90 minutes

Original release
- Network: Lifetime
- Release: December 15, 2007

Christmas in Paradise is a 2007 American Lifetime television Christmas movie which originally aired on December 15, 2007. Starring Charlotte Ross, Colin Ferguson, Devon Werkheiser, Josie Loren, Kenton Duty and Aria Wallace, the film tells the story of two families who find companionship during a Caribbean Christmas holiday, only to have their idyllic vacation disrupted by an unexpected visitor from the past. The movie was filmed entirely on location on the island of Puerto Rico in 2007, and has subsequently been rebroadcast on Lifetime every year during the holiday season as an annual Christmas film.

== Synopsis ==
Two families looking to escape painful holiday memories take a vacation to an exotic Caribbean island over Christmas. A widowed mother, Dana (Charlotte Ross), and her two sons, Chris (Devon Werkheiser) and Michael (Kenton Duty) meet a divorced father, Dan (Colin Ferguson), and his two daughters, Blair (Josie Loren) and Nell (Aria Wallace) when their cruise ship docks in Puerto Rico. Despite a rough start, the parents and kids begin to develop bonds over the course of their stay at a beautiful Puerto Rican beach resort. It looks like an idyllic Brady Bunch holiday for the two families as Dana and Dan try to put their personal tragedies behind them and begin to grow closer, until an unexpected visitor from the past appears and threatens their tentative romance. What promised to be a joyous Christmas filled with fresh hope and new relationships turns complicated as each member of the two families must sort out their feelings and choose their own path.

== Cast ==
Actor	Role	Ref.
Charlotte Ross	Dana Marino	
Colin Ferguson	Dan Casey	
Devon Werkheiser	Chris Marino	
Josie Loren	Blair Casey	
Kenton Duty	Michael Marino	
Aria Wallace	Nell Casey	
Marta Martin	Madeline	
Abimael Linares	Julio	

== Home video ==
On October 18, 2011, Lifetime, in association with A&E Entertainment, released a double-feature DVD of Christmas in Pradise along with Deck the Halls in the North American Region 1 DVD format.

== See also ==
- List of Christmas films
