= Purgatory House =

- Release poster
- Directed by: Cindy Baer
- Written by: Celeste Davis
- Produced by: Cindy Baer
- Starring: Celeste Davis; Jim Hanks; Johnny Pacar; Devin Witt
- Cinematography: Christopher Nibley
- Edited by: K.J. Gruca
- Music by: John Swihart
- Distributed by: Image Entertainment
- Release dates: April 17, 2004 (American Independent Film Festival, France)
- Running time: 97 minutes
- Country: United States
- Language: English

Purgatory House is an independent film written by 14-year-old Celeste Davis and directed by Cindy Baer, who were paired in the Big Sisters of America program when Davis was 11 years old. It deals with the topics of teen suicide and drug addiction from a teen's perspective. Shot in Los Angeles in the summer of 2001, this movie marked the beginning of the Democratization of Film. A critical darling, it screened at 25 festivals, won 12 festival awards, 2 PRISM Award Nominations, appeared on 5 critics lists for "Best Films of the Year" and was then distributed by Image Entertainment.

== Plot ==
Purgatory House follows the after-life journey of Silver Strand (Celeste Marie Davis), a lonely teenage girl who abandoned her life of addiction with boyfriend Sam (Johnny Pacar) only to find herself caught somewhere between Heaven and Hell. Here Silver will decide if she'll accept her existence or finally discover the power within herself to change. Her guides along the path to self-enlightenment include a wry Saint Jim Hanks, a motley group of fellow teen souls condemned also to the Purgatory House, and God.

== Cast ==
- Celeste Marie Davis as Silver Strand
- Jim Hanks as Saint James
- Devin Witt as Atticis
- Johnny Pacar as Sam
- Rhiannon Main as Celeste
- Howard Lockie as Silver's Dad
- Kathryn Skatula as Sam's Mom
- Cindy Baer as Marsha
- Brian Dietzen as Ghost
- Scott Clark as Johnny

== Back Story ==
Director Cindy Baer and teen writer Celeste Davis met when they were paired in the Big Brothers Big Sisters program, when Davis was 11 years old. By the age of 13, Davis had begun to write Purgatory House: a screenplay portraying her real-life challenges to fit in, cope with peer pressure, deal with the teen drug culture surrounding her, and find meaning for her existence. When Davis turned 14 and landed herself in a teen shelter, Baer decided to give her a positive focus by producing Purgatory House as a movie that Davis would star in. In 2001, Davis became the youngest sole-credited screenwriter to have a feature film produced.

== Themes ==
- Teen Spirituality

Purgatory House centers on a lonely teen who feels disconnected from the world around her. When she can no longer fill her void and numb the pain with drugs, she ends her life with the hope of finding an unconditionally loving God. Instead she encounters an eternal stage of limbo (not unlike the world she tried to leave behind) where she must finally deal with the problems she tried to avoid while alive.

Purgatory House demonstrates the base human need to connect with a higher power, or a power outside ourselves. It is a film which advocates spirituality, but not a particular organized religion.

- Addiction/Depression/Suicide

While many films dramatize the symptoms of addiction, depression and suicide, Purgatory House focuses on the root causes. What is the spiritual state of today's American teen? This film asks us to look at how today's teenagers are relating to their spirit, to other people, to the world around them, and to a higher power.

- Media/TV as a Role Model

Purgatory House depicts a world focused on the media. God is depicted as the TV game-show host of "Who Wants to Go To Heaven", a cosmic time-out, where Silver's ultimate fate will be determined. Silver is also made to watch the life she left behind continue without her on "Earth TV" daily. Even in her dream, we see "Dream TV".

Purgatory House poses the question: Are we losing touch with each other and with our children? As more and more parents are absent (literally or figuratively), the media has become the babysitter, role model and higher power. Kids are left to television, movies, video games, and the Internet for companionship and character development.

- The Democratization of Film

With the advancement of digital technologies, film-making had become an accessible medium of expression for anyone with a vision: Written by a high school freshman, shot on miniDV, and created with digital cameras and home-based computers, Purgatory House marked the true beginning of the digital revolution in 2001. From what it revealed about the pressures and struggles that plague our troubled youth, to the cutting-edge technologies that helped create it, Purgatory House is and continues to be uniquely a sign of our times.

- Taking responsibility for the choices we make in our lives
- Invisible Kids
- Art and Writing as a positive creative outlet

== Awards ==
- Won- Plymouth Independent Film Festival - Best Film (Cindy Baer)
- Won- Los Angeles Silverlake Film Festival - Best First Feature (Cindy Baer)
- Won- Los Angeles Silverlake Film Festival - Best Actress (Cindy Baer)
- Won- San Diego Film Festival - Best Screenplay (Celeste Davis)
- Won- Blue November - Best Production (Cindy Baer)
- Won- Houston International Film Festival - Platinum Award for Feature Film (Cindy Baer)
- Won- North Texas Film Festival - Spirit of Independent Filmmaking (Cindy Baer)
- Won- North Texas Film Festival - Best Director (Cindy Baer)
- Won- North Texas Film Festival - Best Actress (Celeste Davis)
- Won- Dances With Films - Audience Award (Cindy Baer)
- Won- Agen Independent Film Festival (France) - Audience Award (Cindy Baer)
- Nominated - EIC PRISM Awards - Best Feature in a Film Festival (Cindy Baer)
- Nominated - EIC PRISM Awards - Best Feature on DVD (Cindy Baer)

== Style ==
- Genre – Teen, Drama, Outcast, Spiritual, Reality-fiction, Recovery, Art Film, Postmodernist film
- Postmodernist film – The film is a self-reflective social commentary, with various postmodern overtones. A grassroots, mini-DV approach is used as a reminder to the audience of the young writer's voice while watching the movie.
- Art film – The film itself is used to create the prison-like purgatory of the main character and young writer.
- Color Effects and Sound – There are four time-lines which occur in the film; each with its own look and sound.
1. Purgatory is desaturated and quiet.
2. Earth is overly saturated and noisy.
3. Flashbacks are black and white and noisy.
4. Dreams are colorful and quiet.
- Camera style – At the beginning of the movie, the camera is hand held and shaky. As the main character grows and changes, the camera movement goes from hand-held to a steady cam. Finally by the end, when the main character has completed her journey, the camera is locked down and centered.
- Visual effects – Purgatory House features over 200 visual effects including extensive blue and green screen shots which were composited into virtual and real sets. Because it was generally accepted that the Mini-DV format did not have the high resolution needed to support such compositing, Purgatory House broke new ground in this area.

== Music ==
Movie Soundtrack includes the songs:

- "(Don't Fear) The Reaper" (Blue Öyster Cult)
- "My Skin" (Natalie Merchant)
- "Kiss Off" (Violent Femmes)
- "Magic Carpet Ride" (remake by Breck Alan)
- "Mister Smiley Face" (unreleased song by Grammy-nominated Eric Bazilian)
- "Spirit in the Sky" (Norman Greenbaum)
- Exclusive remakes of "I Will Survive" and "Kids in America" (performed by The Mandrakes)
- "Heaven" and "Claire's Prayer" (by Larisa Stow: "Best Singer/Songwriter" 2000 Los Angeles Music Awards)
- "Armageddon" (Dahlia)
