= Insatiable (Warehouse 13) =

- Warehouse 13 episode
- Episode no.: Season 3 Episode 10
- Directed by: Constantine Makris
- Written by: Benjamin Raab & Deric A. Hughes
- Original air date: September 19, 2011

Guest appearances
- Aaron Ashmore as Steve Jinks; Sasha Roiz as Marcus Diamond; Johnny Pacar as Dwayne Maddox

Episode chronology
← Previous "Shadows"	Next → "Emily Lake"

"Insatiable" is the 10th episode of the third season of the SyFy television series Warehouse 13. It originally aired on September 19, 2011.

== Plot ==
In the forests of Ithaca, a young couple is attacked by an unseen creature. While at the hospital, Pete and Myka discover that the bite marks are human. Returning to the forest, they stumble upon Kevin Monroe eating a deer. Kevin appears zombie-like: his face is pale blue, and he is shivering. They take Kevin to the hospital.

Pete and Myka investigate Kevin's house, where they find his son and take him to the hospital where his dad is. While Artie cares for the boy, Pete and Myka follow-up on a police call about an individual eating a squirrel reported as having the same symptoms as Kevin. Pete is bitten while apprehending this person, but Myka starts showing signs; she begins to shiver.

Pete theorizes that the people are zombies, and Artie learns from Kevin's son that the artifact responsible is from a taco truck both victims visited. When they arrive at the taco truck, they are attacked by zombies. Myka turns on Pete; he enters the taco truck and sees a tip jar. Pete realizes that this is the artifact causing the problems: the tip jar is from the Donner Party's ill-fated journey. He destroys the tip jar, neutralizing its effect.

Meanwhile, Claudia is offered a role in a band by the guitarist Dwayne Maddox. Claudia is also told that "death comes for you this night" by Sallah, the Soothsaying Sultan, a fortune-telling booth, and an additional artifact. That night, a statue nearly falls on her, among other misfortunes.

Claudia fails to end the accidents and is nearly drowned by the "Eau de Vie Faucet." She is rescued by Leena, who explains that the fortune-telling booth artifact works by overwhelming the user with dread, so if Claudia ignores it, she will be fine. Claudia accepts the offer from Dwayne to join the band, and they embrace.

The episode concludes with Steve Jinks in a bar, unable to pay his tab because Mrs. Fredric has cut his credit. Marcus Diamond approaches Steve with the offer to pay his bill, asking that Steve join his panel against the Warehouse. Steve accepts the offer and is impressed when Marcus jumps off a building. Mrs. Fredric is seen smiling in satisfaction.

== Cultural references ==
- Claudia plays "Cherry Bomb" by The Runaways. She would play the song again with Cherie Currie in the Season 4 episode "Runaway."
- Artie references the movie Animal House, which chronicles the adventures of a bunch of frat boys who spend most of their time partying and playing pranks on authority figures.
- Pete references This Is Spinal Tap, when stating, "I'm gonna crank this baby up to 11."
- The episode makes many references to popular culture zombie movies, most notably Dawn of the Dead.

== Artifacts and jokes ==
Artifact	Description	Seen/Mentioned
Glass Jar from the Donner Party	Placing money in the jar activates this artifact. This is because the Donner Party would bury money in similar glass jars during their long winter. The artifact first causes a severe drop in body temperature, then causes photosensitivity and an extreme carnivorous craving. Pete shattered the jar to negate its effect on people, but the shards of glass were stored in the Warehouse.	Seen
Sallah the Soothsaying Sultan Fortune-Telling	Not a fortune teller but a hypnotist who causes feelings of extreme dread in people. Accidentally activated by Claudia when she asked why Steve was "being such a tool" while standing in front of it. To negate the effects, you have to ignore Sallah's prediction actively.	Seen
Gargoyle Statue	Unknown effect; was on a shelf near Sallah the Soothsaying Sultan, fell from a high shelf just as Claudia passed under it. It could be that this is its effect;– to try and crush somebody walking under it. The statue was shattered when it hit the floor.	Seen
Albert Butz's Eyeglasses	Wearing these eyeglasses raises body temperature. Albert Butz was the inventor of the thermostat.	Seen
Eau de Vie Faucet	The water that pours from this faucet will attack the nearest living person, encasing them within a bubble of water and drowning them. Once freed, the trapped individual dries within seconds.	Seen
Cinderella's Glass Knife	Stabbing someone with this knife changes them to glass. The effects can be reversed, and the wound healed if the knife is pulled out before the body is completely changed. Seen in the episode "Where and When."	Mentioned
Bodhidharma's Sippers	A "living death" artifact; effects not described.	Mentioned
Marie Laveau's Crucifix	A "living death" artifact; effects not described	Mentioned
Torch of Thanatos	A "living death" artifact; effects not described.	Mentioned
Joke	Description	In Joke/Story Arc
Psi Phi Zeta	The frat house's name is Psi Phi Zeta, a joking reference to the SyFy Channel: Psi Phi is phonetically the same as SyFy.	In Joke
Nanotechnology	Computers in the Warehouse running slowly and various other technical problems occurring, due to the nanotechnology bugs planted by Sally Stukowski in the previous episode	Story Arc

== Critical reception ==
The episode received mixed reviews. IGN gave it the highest rating of 9/10, commenting on the "pitch-perfect plots." They also praised Saul Rubinek and Allison Scagliotti for their performances. Io9 described it as "a fun 'artifact of the week' episode". tvfanatic.com gave the episode a negative review saying the zombie plot was "pretty bland" and that "some character actions simply didn't make sense". However, they did find the Claudia plot the highlight of the episode and described her "inability to let go of her BFFE" as wonderful. thevoiceoftv.com complained that they were jumping on the bandwagon of this year's zombie movies and were unamused by the "lame zombie joke." They also disliked the plot and found the twists predictable. The only positive they found was in Artie's interaction with the young boy. craveonline.com found it a disappointing episode saying that "the show needs to be better than this." They were critical of the plots, finding them flawed and the resolution lackluster. However, they enjoyed Artie's use of artifact glasses.
