= Step Up (TV series) =

American drama web television series

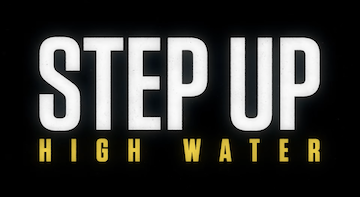
- Also known as: Step Up: High Water
- Genre: Drama; Dance
- Created by: Holly Sorensen
- Based on: Step Up by Duane Adler
- Starring: Lauryn McClain; Petrice Jones; Marcus Mitchell; Terrence Green; Carlito Olivero; Jade Chynoweth; Kendra Oyesanya; Eric Graise; Faizon Love; Naya Rivera; Ne-Yo; Christina Milian; Keiynan Lonsdale; Terayle Hill; Rebbi Rose; Enrique Murciano; Tricia Helfer
- Theme music composer: Kutt the Check
- Composers: EmmoLei Sankofa; Stephanie Economou; Jared Gustadt; Jeff Peters
- Country of origin: United States
- Original language: English
- No. of seasons: 3
- No. of episodes: 30

Production
- Executive producers: Meredith Milton; Adam Shankman; Jennifer Gibgot; Channing Tatum; Jenna Dewan; Holly Sorensen; Bill Brown; Erik Feig
- Producers: Joshua Throne; Salli Newman; Joseph Zolfo
- Cinematography: Joaquin Sedillo
- Camera setup: Single-camera
- Running time: 41–57 minutes
- Production companies: Hollycake (seasons 1–2); Creative Extremists (season 3); Offspring Entertainment; Free Association; Lionsgate Television; Picturestart (seasons 2–3); Everheart Productions (season 3)

Original release
- Network: YouTube Red / Premium
- Release: January 31, 2018 – March 20, 2019
- Network: Starz
- Release: October 16 – December 18, 2022

Step Up (previously titled Step Up: High Water) is an American drama television series created by Holly Sorensen and produced by Lionsgate Television. It is served as a reboot and based on the Step Up film series. It premiered on January 31, 2018, on YouTube Red. Creator Sorensen who also serves as an executive producer alongside Channing Tatum and Jenna Dewan. After being cancelled by YouTube Red after two seasons, Starz picked up the series for a third season, which premiered on October 16, 2022. In December 2022, the series was cancelled after three seasons.

== Premise ==
The series follows the students and faculty of "High Water", Atlanta's most cutthroat performing arts school. When twins Tal and Janelle relocate from Ohio, they find themselves thrust into a world where every move is a test. As they attempt to navigate their new world— on and off the dance floor— they will discover just how deep they are willing to dig to realize their dreams and seize their moment.

== Cast and characters ==
=== Main ===
- Lauryn McClain as Janelle Baker (season 1)
- Petrice Jones (seasons 1–2) and Keiynan Lonsdale (season 3) as Tal Baker
- Marcus Mitchell as Dondre Hall (seasons 1–2)
- Terrence Green as Rigo Octavio
- Carlito Olivero as Davis Jimenez
- Jade Chynoweth as Odalie Allen
- Kendra Oyesanya as Poppy Martinez
- Eric Graise as King
- Faizon Love as Al Baker
- Naya Rivera (seasons 1–2) and Christina Milian (season 3) as Collette Jones
- Ne-Yo as Sage Odom
- Terayle Hill as Marquise Howard (season 3; recurring seasons 1–2)
- Rebbi Rose as Angel Etomi (season 3)
- Enrique Murciano as Ricardo Cruz (season 3)
- Tricia Helfer as Erin Baxter (season 3)

=== Recurring ===
- R. Marcos Taylor as Earnest Octavio/East-O (season 1)
- Al Calderon as Johnny One (season 1)
- Saidah Nairobi as Electra
- Ashley Greene as Nine Sanders (season 2)
- Jeremy Copeland as Zo Browder (season 2)
- Cruz Abelita as Justin (seasons 1-3)

=== Guest ===
- Savion Glover as Quincy Hobbs
- Rick Ross as himself
- Will Swannell as himself
- Todrick Hall as himself
- Robin Givens as Dana
- Travis Wall as himself
- Luther Brown as himself
- Tight Eyez as himself

== Episodes ==
Season	Episodes	Originally released		
Season	Episodes	First released	Last released	Network
1	10	January 31, 2018		YouTube Red
2	10	March 20, 2019		YouTube Premium
3	10	October 16, 2022	December 18, 2022	Starz

=== Season 1 (2018) ===
No. overall	No. in season	Title	Directed by	Written by	Original release date
1	1	"Pilot"	Adam Shankman	Holly Sorensen	January 31, 2018
Janelle and Tal moved in with their uncle in Atlanta after their mother got arrested, and Janelle takes to working in an art school.
2	2	"Solo"	Debbie Allen	Thembi L. Banks & Rochée Jeffery	January 31, 2018
Tal decides to end his bullies' torment on him while Janelle has to do a High Water audition, something she's not comfortable with.
3	3	"The Running Man"	Rob Hardy	Hadjii	January 31, 2018
Tal is racing his classmates on schoolwork, Sage catches everybody by surprise by making an announcement and Davis has a family-problem threatening his future.
4	4	"Shuffle"	Janice Cooke	Molly Kate Margraf & Jerica Lieberman	January 31, 2018
Janelle and Dondre are unable to hide their feelings for each other, and the High Water alliance gets challenged.
5	5	"5.6.7.8"	Janice Cooke	Bryan M. Holdman & William H. Brown	January 31, 2018
After a hashtag about Sage Odom being broke and owing people money goes viral, he comebacks with a live performance of his new hit single with the help of the High Water students.
6	6	"Duets"	Michael Schultz	Thembi L. Banks & Rochée Jeffery	January 31, 2018
Davis kidnaps his little brother Justin from a neglectful foster home. Odalie must help her fugitive boyfriend keep Justin safe and Davis out of jail.
7	7	"Dance Craze"	Nzingha Stewart	William H. Brown	January 31, 2018
Odalie’s two worlds collide exposing her secrets to the other High Water students.
8	8	"Ensemble"	Silas Howard	Bryan M. Holdman	January 31, 2018
Odalie is shunned and hated by many of the High Water students. Most refusing to dance until she’s expelled.
9	9	"Choreography"	Charles Randolph-Wright	Holly Sorensen & Bryan M. Holdman	January 31, 2018
Odalie helps Davis practice for Sage Odom’s professional dance crew in his world tour.
10	10	"Two-Step"	Norman Buckley	Holly Sorensen & William H. Brown	January 31, 2018
Davis makes the word tour team but must choose between following his dreams as a dancer and custody of Justin.

=== Season 2 (2019) ===
No. overall	No. in season	Title	Directed by	Written by	Original release date
11	1	"Precision"	Lisa Leone	Holly Sorensen	March 20, 2019
Odalie and Poppy compete for the team’s female captain title.
12	2	"Splits"	Mary Lambert	Kenny Neibart	March 20, 2019
Davis has dinner at Odalie’s parents’ party. Odalie’s parents find out the truth of her life at High Water.
13	3	"Form"	Lisa Leone	Hadjii	March 20, 2019
Odalie and Davis must figure what to do after her parents cut her off.
14	4	"Vogue"	Charles Randolph-Wright	Rochée Jeffery	March 20, 2019
The dance crew must find their inner sex appeal for the world tour.
15	5	"Inversion"	Damian Marcano	Jordan Heimer & Manuel Figueroa	March 20, 2019
Odalie works with Davis on a stunt piece similar to Dirty Dancing to impress Sage. Still drunk from the night before, Tal makes a huge mistake that could cost Odalie her dance career.
16	6	"Isolations"	Jessica Lowery	Delondra Williams	March 20, 2019
The fallout of Odalie’s injury continues to rock the High Water students.
17	7	"Attitude"	Dominic Leclerc	Molly Kate Margraf & Jerica Lieberman	March 20, 2019
With Tal and Davis’s help, Odalie is able to dance with some aquatic therapy. She finally feels like she’s making progress since her injury.
18	8	"Azonto"	Janice Cooke	Lou-Lou Igbokwe	March 20, 2019
The tensions of Odalie and Davis’s relationship continue to run high. She refuses to apologize to her parents. He must do what’s best for Justin.
19	9	"Improvisation"	Anne Fletcher	William Brown	March 20, 2019
Fully recovered from her injury, Odalie wants a spot back on the world tour. Poppy feels threatened as she and Odalie must compete for her lead spot in the tour. Sage must decide between his vision of the tour and the optics.
20	10	"Hip-Hopera"	Fred Gerber	Holly Sorensen & William Brown	March 20, 2019
Odalie continues to be the most hated person at High Water. Davis gets a chance at joining the world tour.

=== Season 3 (2022) ===
No. overall	No. in season	Title	Directed by	Written by	Original release date
21	1	"Kryptonite"	Damian Marcano	Holly Sorensen	October 16, 2022
22	2	"Ain't Gon' Let Up"	Terrence Green	Delondra Mesa	October 23, 2022
23	3	"Player's Ball"	Dawn Wilkinson	Manuel Figueroa & Jordan Heimer	October 30, 2022
24	4	"Cell Therapy"	Dawn Wilkinson	Hadjii Hand	November 6, 2022
25	5	"Never Scared"	Dawn Wilkinson	William Brown	November 13, 2022
26	6	"You Know What It Is"	Damian Marcano	Jerica Lieberman & Molly Kate Margraf	November 20, 2022
27	7	"It's Goin' Down"	Jamaica Craft	Rebecca Boss & Chris Masi	November 27, 2022
28	8	"Who Can I Run To?"	Dawn Wilkinson	Kemiyondo Countinho	December 4, 2022
29	9	"Bring 'Em Out?"	Holly Sorensen	Jeremy Kaufman	December 11, 2022
30	10	"Sleep When U Die"	Dawn Wilkinson	Kenny Neibart	December 18, 2022

== Production ==
=== Development ===
On June 23, 2016, YouTube announced at the annual VidCon conference in Anaheim, California that they were developing a new drama series based on the Step Up film series with Lionsgate Television producing alongside Channing Tatum and Jenna Dewan.

On June 23, 2017, YouTube announced that it had officially given Step Up: High Water a first season order consisting of ten episodes, each running about 45 minutes in length. The series was described as YouTube Red's first "big-budget, Hollywood-produced television drama" and that its arrival would end up "moving it into more direct competition with players like Netflix and traditional cable networks." In the announcement, it was revealed that each episode of the series would cost several million dollars to produce. A few days later, members of the series' creative team were announced. Original songs for the series were set to be written by singer/songwriter Jason “PooBear” Boyd and “Jingle” Jared Gutstadt. The films series’ choreographer Jamal Sims was expected to choreograph the first episode after which subsequent episodes would be choreographed by Jamaica Craft. The pilot episode was set to be directed by Adam Shankman. It was later reported that Debbie Allen had directed the show's second episode.

On May 22, 2018, it was announced that YouTube had renewed the series for a second season. On January 24, 2019, it was reported that the second season would premiere on March 20, 2019. On August 16, 2019, YouTube Premium canceled the series after two seasons. On May 28, 2020, Starz picked up the series for a third season. Following filming restrictions during the COVID-19 pandemic, Blackhall Studios reopened for production on several films and the series, which was being written at the time, on July 13, 2020. Production was immediately paused on the same day when lead actress Naya Rivera was found dead following a boating accident five days prior. Rivera's character had been set to appear; in August 2020 it was announced that a re-worked season would begin filming in January 2021. On September 17, 2022, it was announced that the third season would premiere on October 16, 2022. Days before the season finale, it was announced that Starz had canceled the series.

=== Casting ===
On June 28, 2017, it was announced that Ne-Yo, Naya Rivera, Faizon Love, Lauryn McClain, Petrice Jones, Marcus Mitchell, Jade Chynoweth, Carlito Olivero, Terrence Green, R. Marcos Taylor, Eric Graise, and Kendra Oyesanya had been cast in the series' main roles. On January 19, 2018, it was reported that Savion Glover would make a guest appearance in the series as a teacher at High Water. On August 28, 2018, it was announced that in season two Ashley Greene and Jeremy Copeland were joining the cast, that Rick Ross and Todrick Hall would appear as themselves, and that JaQuel Knight would make a cameo appearance in addition to choreographing episode three. After YouTube canceled the series, Petrice Jones moved on to other projects, leaving him unavailable by the time Starz picked up the show for Season 3. His role was filled by Keiynan Lonsdale as new character Tal Baker. Because of Naya Rivera's death, Christina Milian was cast as Collette.

== Release ==
=== Marketing ===
Promotional poster for Fathom Events' special screening of the premiere episode.

On July 12, 2017, YouTube released a video introducing the show's main cast. On August 13, 2017, the cast of the series, including Jade Chynoweth and Kendra Oyesanya, performed at the 2017 Teen Choice Awards with a highly choreographed dance routine.

On December 19, 2017, YouTube released the first trailer for the series and announced that the show would premiere on January 31, 2018, with all ten episodes released at once. On January 24, 2019, the official trailer for season two was released.

=== Premiere ===
On January 30, 2018, YouTube partnered with Fathom Events for special screenings of the first episode of the series at more than 750 movie theaters. The event also included a screening of the original 2006 Step Up film that launched the five-film franchise, and a behind-the-scenes look at the making of the television series.

== Reception ==
In a positive review, Sonia Saraiya of Variety offered the series praise saying: "This YouTube Red original has found an intriguing way to blend the mediums of dance, film, and soapy teen television, with an energetic, conscious new installment in the series that is a lot of fun to get sucked into." In another favorable critique, Decider's Kayla Cobb described the series as "a genuinely compelling and dramatic story that very well may stand as the best narrative installment of the Step Up universe."
