= Glenn Steelman =

American film and television director

- Other names: Glenn L. Steelman; Glen Steelman
- Occupations: Film director, television director
- Years active: 1989–present

Glenn L. Steelman is an American film and television director.

He worked as an assistant director on a number of independent films namely Cyborg 3: The Recycler (1995), The Nature of the Beast (1995), The Expert (1995) and other films. In 1997, he began working in television working as an assistant director on the television series Women: Stories of Passion, Lizzie McGuire, Close to Home, Terminator: The Sarah Connor Chronicles, Hung, Revenge and Make It or Break It, making his head directorial debut on the latter series.

Prior to directing, Steelman had a small acting role as Cop #2 in the 1989 film Psycho Cop.
