= Love Hurts (2009 film) =

- Film poster
- Directed by: Barra Grant
- Written by: Barra Grant
- Produced by: Brian Reilly
- Starring: Richard E. Grant; Carrie-Anne Moss; Johnny Pacar
- Cinematography: Alan Caso
- Edited by: Roger Bondelli
- Release date: November 2, 2009 (United Kingdom)
- Running time: 95 minutes
- Country: United States
- Language: English

Love Hurts is a 2009 romantic comedy film with Richard E. Grant, Carrie-Anne Moss, Johnny Pacar, Jenna Elfman, Janeane Garofalo and Camryn Manheim. It was written and directed by Barra Grant.

On review aggregator Rotten Tomatoes, the film holds an approval rating of 29% based on 7 reviews, with an average rating of 4.14/10.

== Synopsis ==
Richard E. Grant plays Ben Bingham, a middle-aged ear, nose and throat doctor. Carrie-Anne Moss plays Amanda, his vibrant wife. Amanda leaves Ben when the idea of sharing an empty nest with her inattentive husband becomes unbearable. Ben becomes depressed and tries to drown himself in alcohol. He walks around in pajamas until his son Justin (Johnny Pacar) gives his dad a makeover and introduces him to the social scene. Before long, Ben becomes so popular that he is pursued by his nurse, his personal trainer, and karaoke-loving twin sisters. However, things quickly change when Justin finds himself in love. It is now Ben’s turn to teach his son the art of romance and in the process recapture his own wife's love.

== Cast ==
- Richard E. Grant as Ben Bingham
- Carrie-Anne Moss as Amanda Bingham
- Johnny Pacar as Justin Bingham
- Jenna Elfman as Darlene
- Janeane Garofalo as Hannah Rosenbloom
- Camryn Manheim as Gloria
- Julia Voth as Young Amanda
- Angela Sarafyan as Layla
- Jeffrey Nordling as Curtis
- Yvonne Zima as Andrea
- Olga Fonda as Valeriya
- Rita Rudner as Lisa Levanthorp
- Jim Turner as Doctor
- Cameron Van Hoy as Young Ben
- Candice Accola as Sharon
