= Hunter&Game =

- Directed by: Kevin Alexander
- Written by: Kevin Alexander
- Produced by: Jennifer Cipperly; Samantha Cornwell; Allison Pearce; Jonathan Pfeffer; Daniel Schloss
- Starring: Cameron Scoggins; Nico Tortorella; Audrey Jessup; Dan Bittner; Stephen Singer
- Release date: October 2014
- Running time: 77 minutes
- Country: United States
- Language: English

Hunter&Game is a comedy/mockumentary indie film, written and directed by Kevin Alexander. The film, which premiered at the LA Indie Film Fest in October 2014, won both Best Feature and Best Director of a Feature Awards. The film then went on to have its East Coast premiere at the Art of Brooklyn Film Festival in May 2015, where it won the Best Feature award.

== Cast ==
- Cameron Scoggins as Sasha Bernstein
- Nico Tortorella as Carson Lowe
- Pep Muñoz as Edu
- Audrey Jessup as Karen
- Dan Bittner as Mike
- Stephen Singer as Sasha's Dad
- Anthony Fazio as Leon
- Anya Migdal as Russian Interviewer
- Rebecca Nelson as Sasha's Mother
- Sophie Simpson as Kristen (PAF Interviewer)
- Dov Tiefenbach as Aaron
- Libby Woodbridge as Interviewer
- Britne Oldford as Hip Girl 1
- Clea Alsip as Enya
- Karina Bradfield as Small Girl at 285 Kent
- Aja Dier as Girl at 285 Kent
- Holly Kiser as Hip Girl 2
- Declan Krogman as Tyler
- Joseph Reiver as Austin (Guy at 285 Kent)
- Harry Smith as British journalist

== Plot ==
An aspiring Catalan filmmaker captures the week leading up to the debut album release of Brooklyn-based electronic music duo Hunter&Game.

== Locations ==
- Brooklyn, New York, USA
- Cake Shop, New York, USA
