= Anya Monzikova =

Russian-American model, actress (b. 1984)

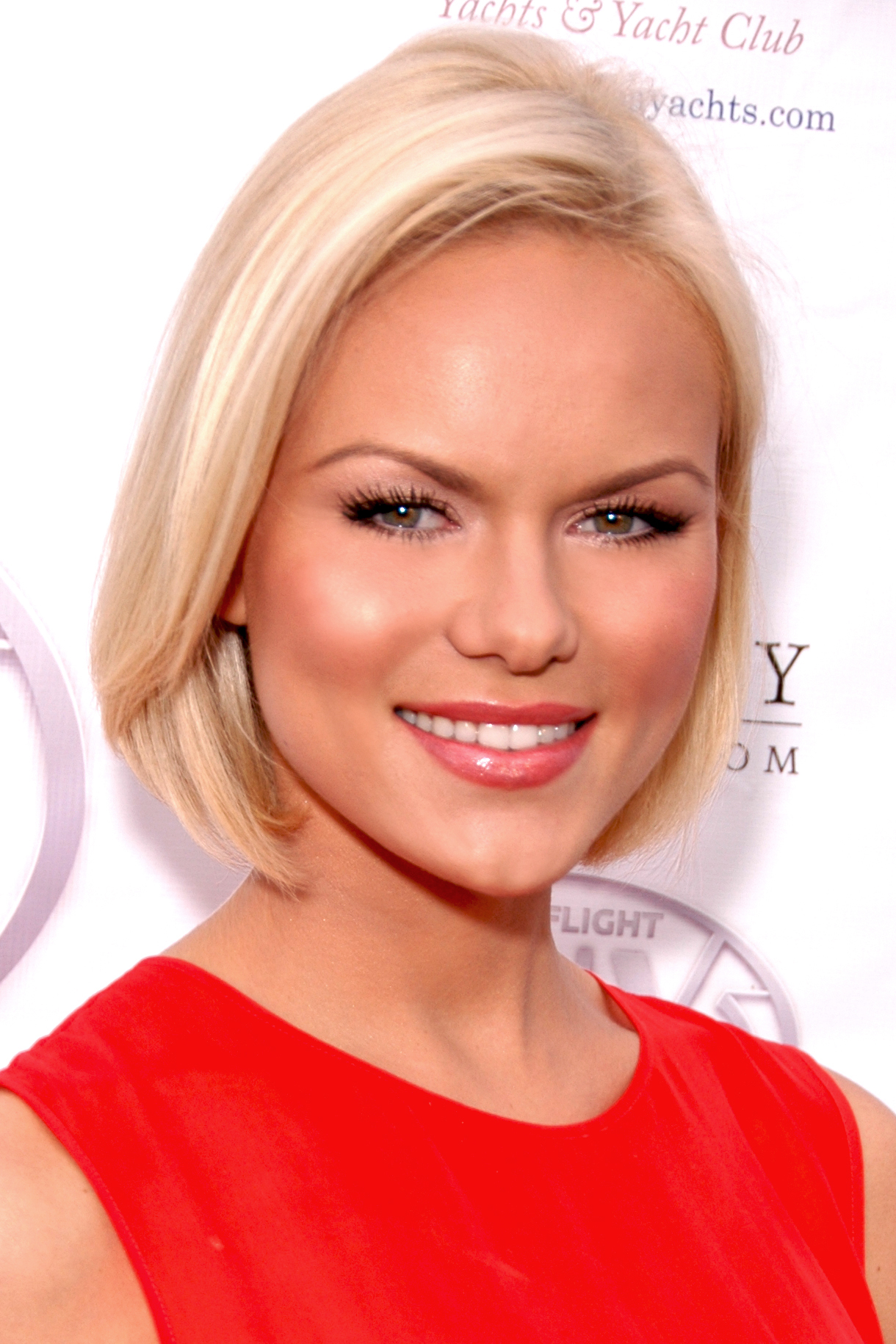
- Monzikova in 2008
- Born: Anna Gennadievna Monzikova; August 25, 1984 (age 42); Vologda, Russian SFSR, Soviet Union
- Occupations: Actress, model
- Years active: 2003–present
- Spouse: Josh Fritts (m. 2010)
- Children: 2

Anya Monzikova (Russian: А́нна Геннадиевна Мо́нзикова; born August 25, 1984) is a Russian-American model and actress, best known for being a suitcase model on the American game show, Deal or No Deal (2006–2009).

== Early life ==
Monzikova was born in Vologda, Russian SFSR, Soviet Union. She lived in Russia up to the age of eight, when she moved to Florida. After she graduated from high school, she moved again to Los Angeles to pursue a career in acting. She studied Wushu and took stunt classes, in order to perform her own stunts for her role in Iron Man. She is a naturalized US citizen.

== Career ==
In 2006, she became a model on NBC's hit game show, Deal or No Deal holding case #10. However, in the "Big Money Week" in season 1 she held case #19. She had the role until the end of the show in 2009.

In 2007, Monzikova played the angel character from the painting "The Wounded Angel" in the music video Amaranth, the second single from Dark Passion Play, the album of Finnish metal band Nightwish.

Monzikova is featured in a photo shoot in the August 2007 issue of Stuff magazine. She is also on the cover of Runway Magazine along with seven other Deal or No Deal models with a feature inside.

In 2008, she played Jessica Jaynes in the CSI: Crime Scene Investigation episode "Drop's Out".

She was also featured for television commercials for the product "Skinit", a line of customizable phone covers. She appeared in the 2009 movie Surrogates, where she was credited as "Beautiful Woman". She had a guest starring role, Ivana Alexandrovna, in Knight Rider. Monzikova played Rebeka in the 2010 film Iron Man 2.

In 2011, Monzikova played Sarah in the Syfy/The Asylum film Zombie Apocalypse. In 2012, she played Elena Romanova in the ABC Family show Melissa & Joey. Shooting a comedic pilot called Nat & Olga, she played the series lead of Nat.

In April, Monzikova played Darla McKendrick in the TV series Femme Fatales.

She played a prostitute in episode 12 in season 2 of The Client List in 2013.

In 2018, she had a guest role, Irina Zemanova, in the S.W.A.T. episode "Source", the 19th episode of the first season.

== Personal life ==
Monzikova married Josh Fritts on June 5, 2010. The couple had a son in 2014, named August.
