= Bethany C. Meyers =

American fitness entrepreneur

- Born: Bethany Christine Meyers; Missouri, United States
- Occupations: Fitness instructor; entrepreneur
- Spouse: Nico Tortorella (m. 2018)
- Children: 2

Bethany Christine Meyers is an American fitness and lifestyle entrepreneur. They (Note: Meyers uses they/them and she/her pronouns. This article uses they/them for consistency.) are the founder and chief executive officer of be.come, an exercise fitness program and mobile application.

== Early life ==
Meyers grew up outside of St. Louis, Missouri, on the Mississippi River and was raised in a conservative, Christian family. Meyers' father died when they were 10 years old. Their mother later remarried.

Meyers attended a private Christian school affiliated with their church, and was a competitive cheerleader. They were cut from their school sports teams and cheerleading squad and claimed they were harassed by school administrators after their family started attending a more progressive church. At 16 years old, Meyers transferred to a public high school located in Crystal City, Missouri.

Meyers attended university in Chicago, studying public relations. They struggled with bulimia nervosa and anorexia nervosa while in college.

== Career ==
Meyers moved from Chicago to Los Angeles to work in public relations. Not long after, they quit their job and began working at a fitness studio that specialized in Megaformer pilates routines. After a coworker opened a fitness studio in Dallas, Meyers moved to Texas and began working there, and later worked as a fitness instructor at SLT Studio in New York City before launching their own workout and fitness business called be.come. The firm's workouts are a mixture of pilates, yoga, and strength training. They gained notoriety on Instagram for their workout tutorials and healthy lifestyle posts. In July 2018 Meyers, launched the fitness app for be.come, specializing in body-positive workouts. Meyers releases weekly 25-minute workout routines through the app, teaches fitness classes online through the be.come app and website, and taught classes at Studio B in Manhattan before opening a workout facility in Union Square in September 2018.

In 2018, Meyers and Nico Tortorella announced they were working on filming a global television show focusing on gender, sexuality and relationships. In December 2018, they partnered with Lovers, a sex toy retailer, to launch a private label under the campaign #WeAreLovers. In May 2018, Meyers and Tortorella co-hosted the 33rd AIDS Walk New York in Central Park, raising $4,416,919. In December 2018, Meyers gave a TED talk on empowerment and body neutrality.

== Personal life ==
Meyers uses they/them and she/her pronouns and is queer, bisexual, and non-binary. In 2017 they proposed to actor Nico Tortorella, whom they met in college, after eleven years of dating. On March 9, 2018, Meyers and Tortorella married in a civil ceremony at a Manhattan City Clerk's office before exchanging vows at St. Paul's Chapel, an Episcopal church and parish church of Trinity Church Wall Street. They both wore gender non-conforming outfits designed by Andrew Morrison with crowns. Meyers and Tortorella are in a polyamorous marriage and both openly date other people. The two have two children, a daughter, born in 2023, and a son born in 2024.

On September 27, 2018, in the wake of allegations of sexual assault made against Brett Kavanaugh by Christine Blasey Ford during his nomination for the Supreme Court, Meyers posted on social media about their experience being sexually assaulted. Meyers had been sexually assaulted by a former boyfriend and thought about coming forward during the MeToo movement, but did not until hearing Ford's testimony.
