= The Remaining =

- Theatrical release poster
- Directed by: Casey La Scala
- Screenplay by: Casey La Scala; Chris Dowling
- Story by: Casey La Scala
- Produced by: Marc Bienstock; Brad Luff
- Starring: Alexa Vega; Shaun Sipos; Johnny Pacar; Italia Ricci; Bryan Dechart
- Cinematography: Doug Emmett
- Edited by: Paul Covington
- Music by: Nathan Whitehead
- Production companies: Affirm Films; Cinematic; Sunrise Pictures; Baron Films
- Distributed by: Triumph Films
- Release date: September 5, 2014
- Running time: 88 minutes
- Country: United States
- Language: English
- Box office: $2.3 million

The Remaining is a 2014 American apocalyptic horror film directed by Casey La Scala, who co-wrote the script with Chris Dowling. Starring Alexa Vega, Shaun Sipos, Jonny Pacar, Itallia Ricci and Bryan Dechart, the film centers upon a group of friends that are forced to examine their lives when the Apocalypse strikes. The film had a limited theatrical release on September 5, 2014, and it was the final film to be distributed by Triumph Films before the company went dormant. The film received generally negative reviews.

== Plot ==
The film opens with a montage of videos depicting Skylar "Sky" and Dan's happy moments together. In the present, Skylar and Dan are celebrating their wedding. Tommy Covington is shooting a documentary as a favor for Dan. During the wedding, Tommy is in an elevator with Skylar's parents, who are Christian. However, before answering a question, the air turns cold and Skylar's parents suddenly drop dead, their eyes white. When Tommy exits the elevator, he finds the main floor has descended into high chaos, as others have dropped dead with the same white eyes. As Tommy and Jack exit the building to investigate a tremor, they find the city up in flames as planes fall from the sky and explode upon impact.

When racing back to the building to find a safer way out, an ear-splitting sound, similar to a trumpet, echoes across the building. After this, loud claps of thunder and intense lightning are present. When Tommy, Dan, Skylar and Jack exit the building safely, Skylar theorizes that they are experiencing the Rapture, as the believers are raptured and the non-believers are left behind. Tommy dismisses this, as what he believes what is happening right now is related to science. Skylar then declares that they need to get to a place of safety, as the events will grow worse and worse as time goes on.

Afterward, monstrous-sized hail rains down on the town. The four proceed to seek shelter in a library. Tommy encounters Sam in the library. Skylar finds a Bible and tells Sam, Dan, Jack, and Tommy a verse related to the Rapture, the First Trumpet. The five proceed to go to a nearby church for safety. Nearing the church, a demonic being snatches Skylar out of Dan's grip and they find her on the road but heavily injured by the entity. Upon reaching the church, the group is let in and led to the sanctuary for safety by Pastor Shay.

When walking in the church, Jack reunites with Allison while Dan tries to comfort Skylar while she is being healed. When Tommy asks what's going on, Shay explains that they are living in the Rapture. More survivors are let inside the church, but one of them is pregnant. The pregnant woman does give birth, but her baby doesn't show signs of crying or breathing, indicating that the baby is stillborn. When Tommy asks why God kills these people, Shay explains that God raptures the believers' souls while leaving their mortal bodies behind. Shay explains that the reason why he wasn't raptured was that he didn't display real faith in Christianity. A survivor tries to get into the church, only for a demonic being to kill him, while cracking a church window in the process. Sam records Tommy say a message to Allison just in case Tommy doesn't make it. A news article reveals that the Rapture has occurred worldwide, with children, infants and Christians getting raptured, with scientists labeling it as "Instant Death Syndrome" and that unusual weather has been occurring worldwide. Tommy shows Shay, Jack, and Allison a video of Skylar getting snatched by the unknown force, with Shay explaining that the Fifth Trumpet was played. Frame by frame, they see the face of a Fallen.

As Shay tries to lift up the spirits of the people, The Fallen start to attack the church, forcing the congregation to flee to the church's basement. Shay sacrifices himself to save the others. When morning comes, Tommy, Jack, Sam, Allison, and Daniel carry Skylar to the hospital to search for medicine but she dies of her injuries that contained demonic venom. Heartbroken, Daniel rants at God and he is impaled by a tentacle and dragged into the sky. Alison is also killed.

After a long while of walking, the group reaches the relief camp by nightfall, where Sam shows a video of Alison choosing God moments before she was killed. In grief, Jack gets baptized before being killed and demons attack the relief camp upon Amazing Grace playing on the radio, which the demons are actually drawn to faith.

Sam chooses God and is killed with Tommy following moments later. Demons descend from the sky as the movie ends.

== Cast ==
- Johnny Pacar as Tommy Covington
- Shaun Sipos as Jack Turner
- Bryan Dechart as Daniel “Dan” Gardener
- Alexa Vega as Skylar Chapman
- Italia Ricci as Allison
- Liz E. Morgan as Sam
- Kimberley Drummond as Lauren Neyland
- John Pyper-Ferguson as Pastor Shay
- Kim Pacheco as Nurse Rachel
- Luciana Kraus as Flower girl (uncredited)

== Production ==
La Scala was inspired to create The Remaining while working on the film Amityville: The Awakening and visiting the set of Paranormal Activity 5, where he wondered "What would it be like to do a global Paranormal Activity?" After that, La Scala began researching mythologies for the film while also drawing upon his own past Biblical knowledge. He decided to "[follow] the rules of Revelation" and tried to make the film Biblically accurate.

== Release ==
The film opened in the United States on September 5, 2014. In its opening week, the movie grossed $159,143 from a total of 67 screens. In its second week, the screen count increased to 85 and brought in $242,095, a 52% increase (while retaining the film's per-screen average of opening week). The movie dropped for the next two weeks. Even though the movie dropped by 38% in its fourth week, the movie almost doubled its per-screen average compared to opening week. So far, the film has made $1,109,157.

The film also began its international run in both Philippines and Mexico on September 24 and 25, respectively. It expanded shortly thereafter to Argentina, Ecuador, and Bolivia at the start of October. The international total stands at $573,627.

As of December 2019, the film has a worldwide gross of $2.3 million.

== Reception ==
On review aggregator Rotten Tomatoes, the film holds an approval rating of 60% based on 10 reviews, with an average rating of 4.5/10. On Metacritic, the film has a weighted average score of 38 out of 100, based on 4 critics, indicating "generally unfavorable reviews". One critic was even quoted as saying "The only redeeming quality of the movie was the flowergirl". Variety was mixed in their opinion of the film, criticizing it for using overly clichéd elements of the found footage genre and for containing "ham-handed" dialogue, speechifying, and proselytizing, while stating that the film might "find an appreciative audience once this small-budget indie finishes its limited theatrical run and is resurrected in homescreen platforms." Commonsensemedia and The Washington Post both panned the film, with The Washington Post rating the movie at a half star and writing that "There's a fundamental problem here. The movie relies on the instinctual human fear of death, but its message is that dying is a promotion."
