= The Young Kieslowski =

2014 film by Kerem Sanga

- Release poster
- Directed by: Kerem Sanga
- Written by: Kerem Sanga
- Produced by: Seth Caplan; Danny Leiner; David Hunter; Ross Putman
- Starring: Ryan Malgarini; Haley Lu Richardson; Joshua Malina; Osric Chau; Jessica Lu; Melora Walters; James Le Gros
- Cinematography: Ricardo Diaz
- Edited by: Ryan Brown
- Music by: John Swihart
- Production company: PSH Collective
- Distributed by: Mance Media
- Release dates: June 14, 2014 (LA Film Festival); July 24, 2015 (United States)
- Running time: 96 minutes
- Country: United States
- Language: English

The Young Kieslowski is a 2014 American romantic comedy-drama film written and directed by Kerem Sanga and starring Ryan Malgarini, Haley Lu Richardson, Joshua Malina, Osric Chau, Jessica Lu, Melora Walters, and James Le Gros. It is loosely inspired by the story of Sanga's own parents.

The film premiered at the LA Film Festival on June 14, 2014, where it won the Audience Award for Best Narrative Feature. It was released in select theaters and on video on demand in the United States on July 24, 2015, by Mance Media.

== Plot ==
Brian Kieslowski and Leslie Mallard are both undergraduates at Caltech, and both socially awkward virgins. At a party, they meet and hook-up. Afterwards, Leslie discovers that she is pregnant with twins, and decides she wants to keep them. Brian, in his first relationship and out of his depth, does what he believes is the right thing. He pretends to support her in her decision, while secretly hoping that she will change her mind. The two of them then embark on a California road trip to break the big news to both of their uniquely dysfunctional families.

== Cast ==
- Ryan Malgarini as Brian Kieslowski
- Haley Lu Richardson as Leslie Mallard
- Joshua Malina as Robert Kieslowski
- Melora Walters as Barbara Kieslowski
- James Le Gros as Walter Mallard
- Osric Chau as Hanyeoul Cho
- Jessica Lu as Hi Jing
- John Redlinger as Charles
- Sam Aotaki as judo girl
- Billy Scafuri as James
- Patrick Rutnam as Ravi
