= Nico Tortorella =

American actor (born 1988)

- Born: July 30, 1988 (age 38); Wilmette, Illinois, U.S.
- Occupations: Actor; model
- Years active: 2009–present
- Spouse: Bethany C. Meyers (m. 2018)
- Children: 2

Nico Tortorella (born July 30, 1988) is an American actor and model, known for screen roles including the slasher film Scream 4 (2011), the Fox crime drama series The Following (2013–2015), and the TV Land comedy drama series Younger (2015–2021). He also played Felix Carlucci on the AMC series The Walking Dead: World Beyond (2020–2021).

== Life and career ==
Tortorella is a native of Wilmette, Illinois, and a graduate of New Trier High School. He is of Italian descent. In May 2009, The CW ordered a 13-episode first season of the drama series The Beautiful Life. The series centered on a group of models sharing a residence in New York City and Tortorella portrayed the role of up-and-coming underwear model Cole Shepard. The series premiered on September 16, 2009, to mixed reviews from critics. The CW cancelled the series after its second episode due to low ratings.

In June 2009, Tortorella was announced to star in the ABC Family teen drama television series Make It or Break It, where he took on the role of Razor, an aspiring singer. Tortorella temporarily left the series to pursue work on The Beautiful Life and, after that series' cancellation, returned to Make It or Break It in a recurring role. In August 2010, Tortorella made a special guest appearance in the episode "If Only..." which marked his final appearance on the series. That year, Tortorella also had a small role in the Joel Schumacher film Twelve.

In June 2010, Tortorella was announced to star in the horror film Scream 4, the fourth installment of the Scream film series. He portrayed Trevor Sheldon, a Woodsboro teenager whose life is in danger when school peers are killed off one by one. Tortorella next appeared on the Fox serial killer drama The Following. The show was created by Kevin Williamson, who also wrote Scream 4. In 2014, Tortorella was cast as Josh, Sutton Foster's character Liza's younger lover in the TV Land comedy-drama Younger, created by Darren Star. His first leading film role was in the 2015 independent film Hunter&Game, in which he played hard-partying electronic musician Carson Lowe, which he described as a "role I was meant to play." The film premiered at the LA Indie Film Fest in October 2014, where it won Best Feature and Best Director of a Feature Awards. The film had its East Coast premiere at the Art of Brooklyn Film Festival in May 2015, where it won the Best Feature award.

Tortorella launched The Love Bomb podcast on the At Will Radio network in September 2016. Tortorella and Matteo Lane were featured on the Nancy podcast on May 1, 2018. Tortorella competed on RuPaul's Secret Celebrity Drag Race in April 2020.

== Personal life ==
Tortorella previously used they/them pronouns, though in 2024 shared that he had shifted to using he/him pronouns. He has identified as bisexual, demisexual, and gender fluid.

Tortorella and Bethany C. Meyers dated for over a decade before they revealed that their polyamorous relationship created divisions with their respective families. Tortorella and Meyers civilly married March 9, 2018, at a Manhattan City clerk's office before exchanging vows at St. Paul's Chapel. The couple have a daughter, born in 2023, and a son born in 2024. In June 2026, Tortorella and Meyers announced that they were expecting their third child.

== Filmography ==
=== Film ===
Year	Title	Role	Notes
2010	Twelve	Tobias	
2011	Scream 4	Trevor Sheldon	
2011	Trespass	Jake	
2013	Odd Thomas	Simon Varner	
2014	Hunter&Game	Carson Lowe	
2019	Fluidity	Matt	
2023	The Mattachine Family	Thomas Reid	

=== Television ===
Year	Title	Role	Notes
2009	The Beautiful Life	Cole Shepherd	Main role
2009–2010	Make It or Break It	Razor	Recurring role
2013	The Following	Jacob Wells	Main role (season 1)
2015–2021	Younger	Josh	Main role
2016	Mamma Dallas	Jesse	Television film
2017	Menendez: Blood Brothers	Lyle Menendez	Television film
2018	RuPaul's Drag Race	Himself	Episode: "Tap That App"; also guest judge
2018	Trailblazer Honors		Television film
2018–2019	How Far Is Tattoo Far?	Himself	Host
2019	Lindsay Lohan's Beach Club	Himself	Guest
2020	RuPaul's Secret Celebrity Drag Race	Himself	Competitor
2020	Legendary	Himself	Guest judge, episode: "Wild Wild West"
2020–2021	The Walking Dead: World Beyond	Felix Carlucci	Main role
2021	Cribs	Himself	Guest
2023	City on Fire	William	Main role

=== Music videos ===
Year	Title	Role	Artist
2013	"Valentine's for One"	Kissing man	Forklift Comedy
