= Josie Loren =

American attorney and former actress (born 1987)

- Born: Jocelyn Loren Lopez; March 19, 1987 (age 39); Miami, Florida, U.S.
- Other name: Josie Leinart
- Education: University of California, Los Angeles (BA); Loyola Law School (JD)
- Occupations: Attorney, actress
- Years active: 2006–2015 (actress); 2021–present (attorney)
- Political party: Republican
- Spouse: Matt Leinart (m. 2018)
- Children: 3

Jocelyn "Josie" Loren Lopez Leinart (born March 19, 1987) is an American attorney and former actress, best known for the role of Kaylie Cruz in the ABC Family series Make It or Break It, and as FBI Agent Michelle Vega in the TV series The Mentalist.

== Early life ==
Loren was born in Miami, Florida, and is of Cuban descent. Her mother is Mercy Lopez, a middle school teacher at Zelda Glazer Middle School in Miami, Florida. She has one older sister and two brothers. Her older brother, Javier Lopez, is a Harvard University graduate and a commercial litigator in Miami. In 2010, she was voted one of the 50 Sexiest Singles by OK! magazine.

She attended high school at New World School of the Arts in Miami where she studied stage acting. Before becoming an actress, she cheered for an all-star cheerleading team in Miami called Top Gun All Stars. She studied mass media communication, minoring in Spanish, at UCLA.

== Career ==
Loren played the character Holly on Hannah Montana, working with the teen sensation Miley Cyrus on the episode "People Who Use People". Determined to make it big in show business, Loren then took on a role in Medium and later appeared on two episodes of the Nickelodeon series Drake & Josh as Maria. In 2007, Loren was cast on the Disney series Cory in the House, playing the character Jessica in the episode "Get Smarter".

Her next project was The Bill Engvall Show, which led her to be chosen for a role in the short comedy Hardly Married, written and directed by Diego Nunez. She followed it up with Christmas in Paradise, and then with 2008’s comic drama This Is Not a Test. She starred alongside Hill Harper, Robinne Lee, and Tom Arnold. Loren then obtained further popularity with a role in the hit film, 17 Again. The big screen comedy was directed by Burr Steers, and starred Zac Efron, Matthew Perry, and Michelle Trachtenberg. In 2009, Loren was cast in the Disney TV movie Hatching Pete. Later that year, she appeared in a starring role on the ABC Family series Make It or Break It, a program which follows the adventures of a group of gymnasts hoping to make it to the Olympics.

In July 2014, Loren was cast as a series regular in the seventh and final season of the crime drama series The Mentalist as rookie FBI agent Michelle Vega.

== Personal life ==
On May 28, 2018, Loren married former NFL player Matt Leinart. The couple has three children together: a son born in January 2020, a son born in May 2021, and a daughter born in February 2025. She is the stepmother to Leinart's son from his previous relationship.

On May 19, 2019, Loren graduated from Loyola Law School.

== Filmography ==
=== Film ===
Year	Title	Role	Notes
2007	Hardly Married	Leti	Short film
2007	Christmas in Paradise	Blair	
2008	This Is Not a Test	Laline	
2009	17 Again	Nicole	
2011	With Me	Jayden	Short film
2013	21 & Over	Pledge Aguilar	
2014	Everlast	Adriana	Short film
2014	Safe	Jessica	Short film

=== Television ===
Year	Title	Role	Notes
2006	Veronica Mars	Chloe	Episode: "President Evil"
2006	Hannah Montana	Holly	Episode: "People Who Use People"
2006	Medium	Amanda's Friend	Episode: "Blood Relation"
2007	Drake & Josh	Maria	Episode: "Battle of Panthatar"
2007	Cory in the House	Jessica	Episode: "Get Smarter"
2007	The Bill Engvall Show	Marissa	Episode: "Good People"
2009	Hatching Pete	Angela Morrissey	Disney Channel Original Movie
2009–12	Make It or Break It	Kaylie Cruz	Main role; 48 episodes
2010	10 Things I Hate About You	Kaylie Cruz	Episode: "The Winner Takes It All"
2011	NCIS	Jane	Episode: "Tell-All"
2011	Castle	Bridget McManus	Episode: "The Dead Pool"
2011	Drop Dead Diva	Julia Campbell	Episode: "Prom"
2013	Miles Across the Sea	Jessie	Episode: "Bed-Headed Fred"
2013	Annie Sunbeam and Friends	Annie Sunbeam	Episode: "Introduction"
2013	The Glades	Hanna Koski	Episode: "Gallerinas"
2014	Hit the Floor	Kendall	3 episodes
2014	Honor Student	Teresa Smith	Television film
2014–15	The Mentalist	Michelle Vega	Main role (season 7); 10 episodes
2015	Young & Hungry	Sam	Episode: "Young & Doppelganger"
2026	Nation's Dumbest	Herself	Episode: "The Science Fair"
