= Michelle Clunie =

American actress (born 1969)

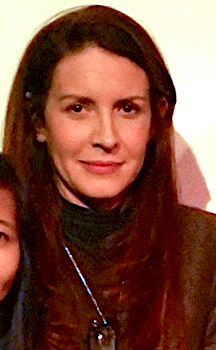
- Clunie in 2014
- Born: November 7, 1969 (age 56); Portland, Oregon, U.S.
- Education: David Douglas High School
- Occupation: Actress
- Years active: 1992–present
- Known for: Queer as a Folk; Teen Wolf; Make It or Break It
- Children: 1

Michelle Renee Clunie (born November 7, 1969) is an American actress and former ballet dancer. A native of Portland, Oregon, Clunie studied ballet from an early age, earning a scholarship at the Academy of Professional Ballet. In 1992, she starred in a Los Angeles–based production of A Comedy of Eros, for which she won a Drama-Logue Award for Best Actress, before making her film debut in the slasher film Jason Goes to Hell: The Final Friday (1993).

Clunie gained international attention for her portrayal of Melanie Marcus on Showtime's series Queer as Folk (2000–2005). She later starred as Ellen Beals on Make It or Break It (2010–2011) and as Mrs. Finch on MTV’s Teen Wolf (2015–2017).

== Early life ==
Clunie was born November 7, 1969, in Portland, Oregon. As a child, she studied ballet, tap, jazz, and violin. Clunie attended Portland's David Douglas High School, graduating in 1987.

She was awarded a scholarship to The Academy of Professional Ballet where she studied and apprenticed throughout her teenage years. At 19 years old she sold her violin for $200 and moved to Los Angeles, California to pursue an acting career.

== Career ==
In 1992, Clunie made her Los Angeles stage debut in Dean Orion's A Comedy of Eros performed at the Skylight Theatre, which earned her a Drama-Logue Award for Best Actress.

Additional stage highlights include her portrayal of Abby in Neil LaBute's West Coast premiere of The Mercy Seat at the Ford Theatre, for which she won the Backstage Readers Best Performance Award, and the world premiere and Off-Broadway production of US, written and performed by Clunie at New York City's Lion Theatre at Theatre Row.

In 1995, she was cast in the Academy Award-winning The Usual Suspects and shortly thereafter played a supporting role in Lost & Found. She became a series regular on The Jeff Foxworthy Show and guest starred on ER, The Tony Danza Show, House M.D., Without a Trace, NCIS, among several others.

She played Melanie Marcus in the US adaptation of Queer as Folk and the biology teacher, Mrs. Finch, on MTV’s Teen Wolf.

== Personal life ==
In October 2014 it was announced Clunie was expecting a child with director Bryan Singer, and in January 2015 she gave birth to their son.

== Filmography ==
=== Film ===
| Year | Title | Role | Notes |
|---|---|---|---|
| 1992 | Sunset Strip | Jonesy | |
| 1993 | Jason Goes to Hell: The Final Friday | Deborah | |
| 1994 | Erotique | Slave #1 | |
| 1994 | Another Midnight Run | Flight Attendant | |
| 1995 | The Usual Suspects | Sketch Artist | |
| 1999 | Lost & Found | Gail | |
| 2002 | Damaged Care | Gemma Coombs | |
| 2005 | The Unseen | Kathleen | |
| 2008 | Solar Flare | Jamie | |
| 2008 | Leaving Barstow | Sandra | |
| 2012 | Magic Mike | Dallas' Girl | |
| 2014 | Death Clique | Tina | |
| 2015 | A Sort of Homecoming | Amy Hartinger | |
| 2016 | Virgin Territory | Harper | |
| 2023 | Everything's Fine | Rachel Ehrlich | |

=== Television ===
| Year | Title | Role | Notes |
|---|---|---|---|
| 1994 | Silk Stalkings | Annie | 1 episode |
| 1994 | Hot Line | Jesse Summerfield | 1 episode |
| 1995 | The Preston Episodes | Meredith | 1 episode |
| 1995–1996 | New York Daze | | 1 episode |
| 1996 | Mad TV | Heidi | 1 episode |
| 1996 | Space: Above and Beyond | Jennifer Brandt | 1 episode |
| 1996 | ER | Gretchen | 1 episode |
| 1996 | Life with Roger | Gina | 1 episode |
| 1996 | The Jeff Foxworthy Show | DeeDee Landrow | Recurring role; 5 episodes |
| 1997 | Boy Meets World | Kelly | 1 episode |
| 1997 | Chicago Sons | Kelley | 1 episode |
| 1997 | Night Man | Megan Farrell | 1 episode |
| 1997 | Pensacola: Wings of Gold | Renny Green | 1 episode |
| 1997 | Players | Veronica Salt | 1 episode |
| 1998 | The Tony Danza Show | Maggie | 1 episode |
| 1998 | Maggie Winters | Charlene | 1 episode |
| 1999 | Pacific Blue | A.D.A. Tucker | 1 episode |
| 1999 | JAG | Sally Wexler | 1 episode |
| 1999 | V.I.P. | Mary Tepsin | 1 episode |
| 2000 | The Strip | | 1 episode |
| 2000 | Diagnosis: Murder | Maeve Michaels | 1 episode |
| 2000 | Honey, I Shrunk the Kids: The TV Show | Mitzy | 1 episode |
| 2000 | Battery Park | Mrs. Fleishman | 1 episode |
| 2000–2005 | Queer as Folk | Melanie Marcus | Recurring role; 83 episodes |
| 2002 | Judging Amy | Nancy | 1 episode |
| 2003 | 1-800-Missing | Tanis Archer | 1 episode |
| 2006 | House M.D | Judy | 1 episode |
| 2006 | Without a Trace | Cindy Peterson | 1 episode |
| 2007 | The Closer | Dr. Leonard | 1 episode |
| 2009 | CSI: Crime Scene Investigation | Paulla Kingsley | 1 episode |
| 2010 | The Mentalist | Tara Harrington | 1 episode |
| 2010 | Outlaw | | 1 episode |
| 2010 | Lie to Me | Jane Prescott | 1 episode |
| 2010–2011 | Make It or Break It | Ellen Beals | Recurring role; 9 episodes |
| 2011 | Detroit 1-8-7 | Alex Bergman | 1 episode |
| 2011 | In Between Men | Marcella Raven | 1 episode |
| 2011 | In Plain Sight | Sage Lorne/Britt Parnell | 1 episode |
| 2013 | NCIS | Meredith Dunn | 1 episode |
| 2014 | Bones | Suzanne Levitt | 1 episode |
| 2015 | Satisfaction | | 1 episode |
| 2015–2017 | Teen Wolf | Mrs Finch (AP Biology Teacher) | Recurring role; 9 episodes |
| 2018 | NCIS: Los Angeles | Luanne Hadlow | 1 episode |

=== Video games ===
| Year | Title | Role | Notes |
|---|---|---|---|
| 1992 | INXS: Make My Video | Tiger | |
| 1997 | Eraser - Turnabout | Grace Swanson | |
