= Marc Berlin =

American film director

Marc Berlin is an American filmmaker, author, and satirist.

Berlin began his film production company Black Sheep Films in 1999. He made the 1999 comedy feature People from Space, Bedford Springs (2002) and the 2004 documentary The Man Who Knew Bush as well as several other documentaries.

Berlin's film Bedford Springs was aired on HBO Europe in June 2004.

The Man Who Knew Bush got worldwide attention and was distributed in France through Wide Management. The DVD is available throughout the United States and Canada.

His latest film is the 2009 comedy mockumentary entitled Crime Scene : The Bobby Ray Summers Story. In 2012, Berlin published two books of humor, That Cloud Looks Like Jesus, and The Skeptic’s Handbook.

Berlin's suspense novel, “Oddball in 3G” is to be published by Black Rose Writing in September, 2019.
