= Cindy Baer =

American film producer

- Born: Boston, Massachusetts, United States
- Occupations: Actress, director, producer, entrepreneur

Cindy Baer is an American actress, director, producer, and entrepreneur. She helms the production company Free Dream Pictures, located in Burbank, California.

She directed and produced the independent feature films Purgatory House and Odd Brodsky, and frequently appears on filmmaking panels across the country, speaking as an expert on low budget filmmaking. Baer specializes in independent and often female-centric films.

== Career ==
Cindy Baer is a film and stage actress, director, and producer who resides in Los Angeles, California. She specializes in independent and often female-centric films.

Baer made her feature debut as both a director and producer with the groundbreaking, micro-budget, independent film, Purgatory House which was entirely written by 14-year-old Celeste Davis, who Baer had been mentoring in the Big Sisters of Los Angeles program for several years prior.

A postmodernist, art film revealed in four timelines, Purgatory House explores the themes of teen spirituality, addiction and suicide, as it chronicles the afterlife journey of Silver Strand, a troubled teen who abandoned her life of turmoil in search of unconditional love. Groundbreaking in 2001, Purgatory House was one of the first features to be shot with digital cameras (in the mini-DV format), edited with home-based computers, and incorporate extensive blue and green screen compositing and visual effects. It screened at 25 film festivals, won 12 festival awards, 2 PRISM Award Nominations, and appeared on 5 critics lists for "Best Films of the Year" It marked the beginning of the democratization of film, when it received distribution from Image Entertainment, one of the largest digital distributors in North America, in 2007.

Baer's second feature Odd Brodsky, which was co-written with her cinematographer husband Matthew Irving screened in 29 film festivals and won 20 festival awards. A quirky, offbeat, comedy, the story line follows 30-something Audrey Brodsky aka "Odd Brodsky" (played by Tegan Ashton Cohan) who quits her dreary desk job to pursue her childhood dream of becoming an actress. A departure in genre from her debut Purgatory House, many of the same themes prevail, such as isolation, media/TV influence, and the longing for a deeper connection. It also dabbles in postmodernism, and has elements of magical realism. Odd Brodsky premiered on iTunes in November 2016.

Baer is also an entrepreneur who has founded four companies, including the two non-profit organizations The Mosaic Theatre company in 2000 and Patron of the Arts in 2009. She founded the production company Free Dream Pictures in 2001, and the children's entertainment company Daizy the Clown & Company at the age 22, which she later sold.

She started her career as an actress at the age of 14 at the Boston Children's Theatre and has performed in over two dozen plays. She starred in and produced the 30th Anniversary production of the stage play Butterflies Are Free, which was written by Leonard Gershe, at the Matrix Theatre in Hollywood, California.
