= Ayla Kell =

American actress

- Occupation: Actress
- Years active: 1994–present

Ayla Kell is an American actress. She is best known for her role as Payson Keeler in the ABC Family series Make It or Break It.

== Career ==
Kell began studying ballet at a young age and danced with the American Ballet Theatre at the Kodak Theatre in Hollywood, California as Greta in The Nutcracker. She completed 15 years of Royal Academy of Dance ballet training at the Los Angeles Ballet Academy and competed in the finals at the Youth America Grand Prix in New York City. She was a featured dancer at Valentio's International Carousel in Tokyo, Japan. Kell has appeared in many international commercials for Disney, Sony, Mattel, and Pringles.

== Personal life ==
In November 2014, Kell began dating actor Sterling Knight, whom she had met on the set of Melissa & Joey. The couple announced their engagement in October 2018. In a November 2020 blog post, Kell revealed that they had ended their relationship in 2019.

== Filmography ==
Film roles
| Year | Title | Role | Notes |
|---|---|---|---|
| 1999 | The Omega Code | Maddie Lane | |
| 2005 | Rebound | Cute Girl / Cheerleader | |
| 2008 | What Just Happened | Mary #1 | |
| 2015 | Rosemont | Lisa | |
| 2015 | Walt Before Mickey | Bridget | |
| 2017 | Sable | Sable | |
| 2021 | Terror Eyes | Lisa | |
| 2022 | Four Cousins and A Christmas | Millie | |

Television roles
| Year | Title | Role | Notes |
|---|---|---|---|
| 1997 | Get to the Heart: The Barbara Mandrell Story | Young Barbara Mandrell | Television film |
| 2004 | Malcolm in the Middle | Kylie | Episode: "Dewey's Special Class" |
| 2005 | Weeds | Chelsea | Episode: "Lude Awakening" |
| 2007 | Without a Trace | Young Mia Jones | Episode: "One and Only" |
| 2008 | Just Jordan | Jade | Episode: "Cool Guys Don't Wear Periwinkle" |
| 2008 | CSI: Miami | Chelsea Marsh | Episode: "And How Does That Make You Kill?" |
| 2009–2012 | Make It or Break It | Payson Keeler | Main role, 48 episodes |
| 2011 | Leverage | Olivia Livingston | Episode: "The Queen's Gambit Job" |
| 2013 | Missing at 17 | Candace | Television film (Lifetime) |
| 2014 | SnakeHead Swamp | Ashley | Television film (Syfy) |
| 2015 | Melissa & Joey | Lilah | Episodes: "Failure to Communicate", "Face the Music" |
