= Johnny Pacar =

American actor

- Born: June 6, 1981 (age 45); Dearborn, Michigan, U.S.
- Occupations: Actor, musician
- Years active: 2002–present

Johnny Edward Pacuraru (Romanian: Păcuraru; born June 6, 1981), known as Johnny Pacar, is an American film and television actor and musician of partial Romanian descent who is best known for his roles as Cody Jackson in the television series Flight 29 Down and as Damon Young on ABC Family's television series Make It or Break It. He also starred in the Disney Channel Original Movie Now You See It..., and had a recurring role as Jimmy Francis in American Dreams.

== Biography ==
Johnny Pacar was born on June 6, 1981. As a youth he always wanted to entertain people. He was an avid hockey player and always dreamed about one day playing in the NHL. However, he chose a different path when he started acting in drama and local theatre. In high school he formed a few bands driven by his punk rock influences, also getting into drama at school where he began doing high school and local theatre. After graduating at Wayne Memorial High School, he moved from Michigan to Los Angeles in May 2001. After two months there, he got an agent and filmed an international commercial for Sprite and landed a recurring role in Boston Public. Pacar also landed guest roles in Tru Calling, Judging Amy, George Lopez, CSI: Miami, Medium, Eli Stone, and starred in the Disney Channel movie Now You See It... Pacar is best known for being cast as Jackson, a regular on the series Flight 29 Down for NBC/ Discovery Kids.

Pacar starred as Damon Young on ABC Family's Make It or Break It, a series about teenage gymnasts striving for the 2012 Olympics.

In 2011 he guest-starred in an episode of Warehouse 13 as Dwayne Maddox. The same year he starred opposite Ving Rhames in syfy's Zombie Apocalypse.

In 2012 he landed a role in the action thriller Channeling and in the same year his film Playback, opposite Christian Slater, was released.

He next starred in the Sony thriller The Remaining, which was released 2014.

Pacar won the "Best Supporting Actor" award at the Orlando Film Festival for his performance in Love Hurts.

Pacar is pursuing a music career. He released his own solo mini album "Moment of Time" on iTunes, and is in the band "Forever The Day" (formerly "Fairlene"), along with fellow Make it or Break it co-star Cody Longo.

"Forever The Day" released their first EP "Under The Afterglow" on August 16, 2010, and released a second part named "Letters of Letting Go" on February 13, 2012.

Pacar released a new solo album named Give It Our Love on March 11, 2013.

He currently lives in Los Angeles.

== Filmography ==
=== Film ===
Year	Film	Role	Notes
2004	Little Black Book	Jamal	Uncredited
2004	Purgatory House	Sam	
2008	Wild Child	Roddy	
2009	Love Hurts	Justin Bingham	
2009	Cryptic	Damon	
2011	Fort McCoy	Texas Slim	
2012	Playback	Julian Miller	
2013	Channeling	Connor	
2014	The Remaining	Tommy	

=== Television ===
Year	Film	Role	Notes
2002	Judging Amy	Jason Christopher	Episode: "Can They Do That with Vegetables?"
2002–2003	Boston Public	Boone	Episodes: "Chapter Forty-Nine", "Chapter Fifty-Five", "Chapter Fifty-Seven"
2003	The Brothers Garcia	Rush Bauer	Episode: "Moving on Up"
2003	Tru Calling	Adam Whitman	Episode: "Star Crossed"
2003–2004	American Dreams	Jimmy Frances	Recurring role, 7 episodes
2004	George Lopez	Noah	Episode: "What George Doesn't Noah..."
2005	Medium	Intoxicated Boy	Episode: "When Push Comes to Shove: Part 2"
2005	Now You See It...	Danny Sinclair	Television movie (Disney Channel)
2005–2007	Flight 29 Down	Cody Jackson	Main role
2006	Cold Case	Dayton	Episode: "Rampage"
2007	CSI: Miami	Nathan Atherton	Episode: "Just Murdered"
2007	Crossing Jordan	Ben Kensith	Episode: "In Sickness & In Health"
2007	Flight 29 Down: The Hotel Tango	Cody Jackson	Television movie
2008	Eli Stone	Eli Stone (Age 19)	Episode: Pilot
2008	Front of the Class	Jeff	Television movie (Hallmark Hall of Fame)
2009	Ghost Whisperer	Miles Maitland	Episode: "Stage Fright"
2009–2011	Make It or Break It	Damon Young	Main role (seasons 1–2)
2011	Warehouse 13	Dwayne Maddox	Episode: "Insatiable"
2011	Zombie Apocalypse	Julien	Television movie
2013	Hot Mess	Ben	Unsold television pilot (MTV)
2016	10 Year Reunion	Shane Conley	Television movie
2018	Killer Night Shift	David Rosen	Television movie
