= Holly Sorensen =

American film producer and screenwriter

- Born: Montana, U.S.
- Education: Dartmouth College (AB)
- Occupation: Screenwriter · film producer

Holly Sorensen is an American film producer and screenwriter.

== Early life and education ==
Holly Sorensen was born and raised in Montana, and was given scholarships to the Annie Wright Schools in Tacoma, Washington, and Dartmouth College, where she studied philosophy and film.

== Career ==
After serving stints as a personal shopper at Saks Fifth Avenue in New York, a bartender at Wrigley Field, a cook in both the five star kitchen of Charlie Trotter and at a rural Buddhist Meditation Center, and an assistant for Gloria Steinem, she became an entertainment journalist for print and TV. Holly was the senior editor for Premiere and has written for Us Weekly, InStyle, O, and many other publications.

She switched careers in 2000, moving to Los Angeles and becoming the President of Production for the indie film studio TSG Pictures (also known at "The Shooting Gallery"), whose movies have won award at the Sundance Film Festival and garnered Oscar nominations. In 2001, Sorensen was the recipient of the notable "Okay, you lazy bitch" fax from author Hunter S. Thompson concerning delays to the shooting of his novel adaptation The Rum Diary. The Shooting Gallery folded later in 2001. Sorensen then began a career as a screenwriter, writing for major studios and production companies, and selling four pilots before having Make It or Break It produced in late-2008 and going to series, airing in 2009 to 2012.

Sorensen now lives in Los Angeles with her family and most recently created the YouTube Premium series Step Up: High Water.
