= Make It or Break It =

Television series

- Genre: Family drama Teen drama
- Created by: Holly Sorensen
- Starring: Josie Loren; Ayla Kell; Cassie Scerbo; Susan Ward; Neil Jackson; Candace Cameron Bure; Peri Gilpin; Chelsea Hobbs; Johnny Pacar; Anthony Starke; Dondre Whitfield
- Theme music composer: Michael Suby
- Opening theme: "Make It or Break It" by Michael Suby
- Composer: Michael Suby
- Country of origin: United States
- Original language: English
- No. of seasons: 3
- No. of episodes: 48 (list of episodes)

Production
- Executive producers: Holly Sorensen; Paul Stupin; John Ziffren
- Producers: Kevin C. Slattery; David Hartle; Maria L. Melograne; Nancy Haas
- Production locations: Los Angeles, California; California State University, Long Beach; Long Beach, California; Santa Monica Civic Auditorium; Santa Monica, California; Santa Clarita Studios; The Ranch, Disney Studios; Santa Clarita, California; Westlake Village, California
- Cinematography: Patrick Cady; Roy H. Wagner; Jonathan West
- Editors: Elena Malagini; Jan Northrop; Nathan Easterling; Lori Jane Coleman; David A. Simmons; Nicholas Erasmus; William Marrinson
- Camera setup: Film; Single-camera
- Running time: 45 minutes
- Production companies: Super Delicious! (pilot); Pirates' Cove Entertainment; ProdCo Original; Hollycake (season 2)

Original release
- Network: ABC Family
- Release: June 22, 2009 – May 14, 2012

Make It or Break It (a.k.a. MIOBI) is an American teen/family drama television series that focused on the lives of teen gymnasts who strived to make it to the Olympic Games in 2012. The series was inspired by Touchstone's 2006 teen comedy-drama film Stick It. It premiered on ABC Family on June 22, 2009, with 2.5 million viewers. The series ended after Season 3. The show was picked up for an additional 10 episodes on July 27, 2009, which started airing on January 4, 2010, bringing the total number of episodes in the first season to 20. In January 2010, the show was renewed for a second season, which premiered on June 28, 2010 at 10 pm. Starting on July 13, 2010, new episodes aired following Pretty Little Liars. The show's second season resumed after a six-month hiatus on March 28, 2011. The series was renewed for a third season on September 16, 2011, which premiered on March 26, 2012. It was announced on April 26, 2012, that the third season would be the final season. The series finale aired on May 14, 2012.

Internationally, the show aired on E4 in the United Kingdom, Zee Café in India, Fox8 in Australia, ABC Spark in Canada, RTM2 in Malaysia, and on TV2 in New Zealand.

Make It or Break It was created by Holly Sorensen who, along with Paul Stupin and John Ziffren, served as the show's executive producers. The stunt doubles were former elite, Olympian or NCAA champion gymnasts.

Make It or Break It is streaming on Disney+, Prime Video, or buy it as a download on Apple TV.

== Plot ==
Payson Keeler (Ayla Kell), Kaylie Cruz (Josie Loren), Lauren Tanner (Cassie Scerbo), and newcomer Emily Kmetko (Chelsea Hobbs) are elite-level gymnasts training for the 2012 Summer Olympics at a gym called "The Rock". The girls' futures are thrown into turmoil when their head coach, Marty Walsh (Erik Palladino), is blackmailed out of his job and is forced to move to a rival gym. It is revealed later that Kaylie's mother (Rosa Blasi) and Marty were having an affair and he left to keep the secret from being exposed. All four girls harbor secrets they must conceal for the sake of their athletic careers. Eventually, they put aside their differences in time to leave for nationals. Payson is favorite to win, but after a fall on the uneven bars, she fractures her spine and is told she can never do gymnastics again. The other three receive spots on the National Team, but clash with the head of the National Gymnastics Committee, Ellen Beals (Michelle Clunie), who prizes obedience to her authority and feels threatened by The Rock girls' independence. To get The Rock girls recognized as being international standard, The Rock holds a private meet between them and the Chinese National Team. Working together, the girls get five medals.

In the second season, the girls are joined at The Rock by superstar male gymnast Austin Tucker (Zane Holtz). Payson, who has undergone surgery, attempts to revitalize her gymnastic career. Sasha dedicates himself to helping her become an artistic gymnastic. Payson develops a crush on Sasha and becomes embarrassed when the practice camera they were using catches the kiss, which Lauren uses to get Sasha kicked out of the Rock. The Kmetko family struggles financially with the loss of Emily's scholarship. The girls compete at trials for the World Championships and all four make the Worlds team. Emily is forced to wear an ankle monitor due to her probation after being caught stealing. The other girls train for the World Gymnastics Competition, a task made harder by the presence of their arch enemy, Kelly Parker, at The Rock. In the season two finale, the four girls lead the team to the World Competition in Rio de Janeiro, where they win team gold.

Season Three opens with Payson, Lauren, and Kaylie heading to the American Olympic Training Center as they prepare for the 2012 London Olympics. They deal with a new coach and teammates, including up-and-coming gymnast Jordan Randall, whose presence causes tension within the group. Coach Mac pairs up the girls, forcing Kaylie to live and work with Kelly Parker and Lauren to work with Payson. Kelly is not good enough for the Olympics and leaves gymnastics. Austin does not make the Olympic Team and blames Kaylie. Jordan reveals that a former coach molested her when she was young. Desperate to ensure her spot on the team, Wendy drugs Kaylie with a cold medicine containing a banned substance. After Austin and Kaylie reunite, then Lauren, Payson, and Jordan tell the NGO that they are boycotting Olympic tryouts unless Kaylie is allowed to perform. Lauren discovers the secret Wendy has been hiding and exposes her, getting Wendy kicked out. The season three finale culminates with the five girls, Payson, Lauren, Kaylie, Jordan, and Colleen, being chosen to represent the U.S. in the Olympics.

== Cast and characters ==
The main cast of Make It or Break It

=== Main cast ===
Cast	Character	Notes
Josie Loren	Kaylie Cruz	Seasons 1–3
Ayla Kell	Payson Keeler	Seasons 1–3
Cassie Scerbo	Lauren Tanner	Seasons 1–3
Chelsea Hobbs	Emily Kmetko	Seasons 1–2
Candace Cameron Bure	Summer van Horne	Seasons 1–2; recurring Season 3
Neil Jackson	Sasha Belov	Seasons 1–2; recurring Season 3
Anthony Starke	Steve Tanner	Seasons 1–2; recurring Season 3
Peri Gilpin	Kim Keeler	Seasons 1–2
Susan Ward	Chloe Kmetko	Seasons 1–2
Johnny Pacar	Damon Young	Seasons 1–2
Dondré Whitfield	Coach McIntire (Mac)	Season 3

=== Recurring cast ===
Cast	Character	Notes
Rosa Blasi	Ronnie Cruz	Seasons 1–3
Jason Manuel Olazabal	Alex Cruz	Seasons 1–3
Brett Cullen	Mark Keeler	Seasons 1–3
Nicole Gale Anderson	Kelly Parker	Seasons 1–3
Zachary Burr Abel	Carter Anderson	Seasons 1–2
Nico Tortorella	Razor	Seasons 1–2
Michelle Clunie	Ellen Beals	Seasons 1–2
Mia Rose Frampton	Becca Keeler	Seasons 1–2
Marcus Coloma	Leo Cruz	Seasons 1–2
Cody Longo	Nicky Russo	Season 1
Erik Palladino	Marty Walsh	Seasons 1–2
Marsha Thomason	MJ Martin	Season 1
Wyatt Smith	Brian Kmetko	Seasons 1–2
Meagan Holder	Darby Conrad	Season 2
Joshua Bowman	Max Spencer	Season 2
Sean Maher	Marcus	Season 2
Kathy Najimy	Sheila Baboyon	Seasons 2–3
Zane Holtz	Austin Tucker	Seasons 2–3
Chelsea Tavares	Jordan Randall	Season 3
Amanda Leighton	Wendy Capshaw	Season 3
Tom Maden	Rigo	Season 3
Russell Pitts	Jake	Season 3

== Episodes ==
Season	Episodes		Originally released	
Season	Episodes		First released	Last released
1	20	10	June 22, 2009	August 24, 2009
1	20	10	January 4, 2010	March 8, 2010
2	20	10	June 28, 2010	August 31, 2010
2	20	10	March 28, 2011	May 23, 2011
3	8		March 26, 2012	May 14, 2012

== Release ==
=== DVD releases ===
Walt Disney Studios Home Entertainment released the first ten episodes in a set entitled Make It or Break It – Volume 1: Extended Edition. Bonus material includes deleted scenes, the never-before-seen extended finale, and the featurette, "Making It", which shows how the stars manage the acting with the difficult stunts they do.

DVD release dates for Make It or Break It
Name	Release dates	Ep #	Additional information
Season 1, Volume 1: Extended Edition	January 12, 2010	10	Deleted scenes, the never-before-seen extended finale, and the featurette "Making It".
Season 1, Volume 2	January 4, 2011	10	Deleted scenes
Season 2, Volume 3	May 3, 2011	10	Deleted scenes

== Reception ==
=== Critical response ===
For the first season, the review aggregator website Rotten Tomatoes reported an 80% approval rating with an average rating of 6.70/10 based on 10 reviews. The website's consensus reads, "With thrilling gymnastics scenes and a likable protagonist, Make It or Break It makes for compelling television." Metacritic, which uses a weighted average, assigned a score of 64 out of 100 based on 6 critics, indicating "generally favorable reviews".

=== Ratings ===
The following is a table with the average estimated number of viewers per episode, each season of Make It or Break It on ABC Family.

Season	Timeslot (ET/PT)	# Ep.	Premiered		Ended		TV Season	Viewers (in millions)
Season	Timeslot (ET/PT)	# Ep.	Date	Premiere Viewers (in millions)	Date	Finale Viewers (in millions)	TV Season	Viewers (in millions)
Season 1	Monday 9:00 pm (2009–2010); Monday 10:00 pm (2010); Tuesday 9:00 pm (2010); Monday 9:00 pm (2011–2012)	20	June 22, 2009	2.50	March 8, 2010	2.50	2009-2010	2.24
Season 2	Monday 9:00 pm (2009–2010); Monday 10:00 pm (2010); Tuesday 9:00 pm (2010); Monday 9:00 pm (2011–2012)	20	June 28, 2010	1.83	May 23, 2011	1.49	2010-2011	1.68
Season 3	Monday 9:00 pm (2009–2010); Monday 10:00 pm (2010); Tuesday 9:00 pm (2010); Monday 9:00 pm (2011–2012)	8	March 26, 2012	1.57	May 14, 2012	1.29	2011-2012	1.19

=== Accolades ===
List of awards and nominations for Make It or Break It
Year	Award	Category	Nominee(s)	Result	Ref.
2009	Teen Choice Awards	Choice Summer TV Show	Make It or Break It	Nominated	
2010	Gracie Allen Awards	Outstanding Female Actor in a Supporting Role in a Drama Series	Peri Gilpin	Won	
2010	Teen Choice Awards	Choice Summer TV Show	Make It or Break It	Nominated	
2010	Teen Choice Awards	Choice Summer TV Star Male	Zachary Burr Abel	Nominated	
2010	Teen Choice Awards	Choice Summer TV Star Female	Josie Loren	Nominated	
2010	BMI Film & TV Awards	BMI Cable Award	Michael Suby	Won	
2011	Teen Choice Awards	Choice TV Drama	Make It or Break It	Nominated	
2011	Teen Choice Awards	Choice TV Star Female Drama	Josie Loren	Nominated	
2013	ASCAP Film and Television Music Awards	Top Television Series	Michael Suby	Won	

== See also ==
- Stick It, an American teen-comedy-drama film in 2006
- Code of Points (artistic gymnastics)
