= Queer as Folk (2000 TV series) =

American/Canadian television series

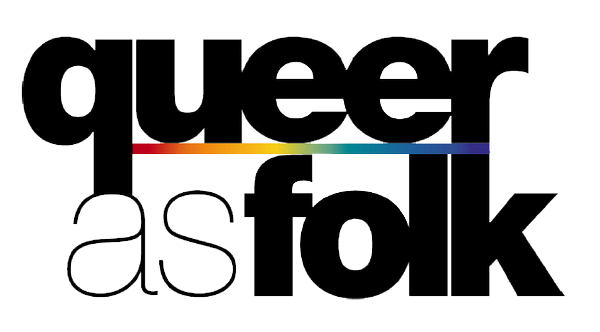
- Genre: Drama
- Based on: Queer as Folk by Russell T Davies
- Developed by: Ron Cowen; Daniel Lipman
- Starring: Michelle Clunie; Thea Gill; Gale Harold; Randy Harrison; Scott Lowell; Peter Paige; Chris Potter; Hal Sparks; Sharon Gless; Robert Gant
- Opening theme: "Spunk" by Greek Buck (seasons 1–3) "Cue the Pulse to Begin" by Burnside Project (seasons 4–5)
- Composer: Tom Third
- Countries of origin: Canada; United States
- Original language: English
- No. of seasons: 5
- No. of episodes: 83 (list of episodes)

Production
- Executive producers: Tony Jonas; Ron Cowen; Daniel Lipman
- Producers: Sheila Hockin; Michael MacLennan; Shawn Postoff
- Production locations: Toronto, Ontario, Canada
- Cinematography: Thom Best; Gavin Smith
- Editor: Lisa Grootenboer
- Running time: 44–58 minutes
- Production companies: Cowlip Productions; Tony Jonas Productions; Temple Street Productions; Channel 4; Showtime Networks; Warner Bros. Television

Original release
- Network: Showtime (United States); Showcase (Canada)
- Release: December 3, 2000 – August 7, 2005

Related
- Queer as Folk (1999 series); Queer as Folk (2022 series)

Queer as Folk is a drama television series that ran from December 3, 2000, to August 7, 2005. The series was produced for Showtime and Showcase by Cowlip Productions, Tony Jonas Productions, Temple Street Productions, and Showtime Networks, in association with Crowe Entertainment and Warner Bros. Television. It was developed and written by Ron Cowen and Daniel Lipman, who were the showrunners and also the executive producers along with Tony Jonas, former president of Warner Bros. Television.

It is based on the British series created by Russell T Davies. Although it was set in Pittsburgh, Pennsylvania, much of the series was actually shot in Toronto and employed various Canadian directors known for their independent film work (including Bruce McDonald, David Wellington, Kelly Makin, John Greyson, Jeremy Podeswa and Michael DeCarlo) as well as Australian director Russell Mulcahy, who directed the pilot episode. Additional writers in the later seasons included Michael MacLennan, Efrem Seeger, Brad Fraser, Del Shores, and Shawn Postoff.

== Show premise ==
The series follows the lives of five gay men living in Pittsburgh, Pennsylvania: Brian (Gale Harold), Justin (Randy Harrison), Michael (Hal Sparks), Emmett (Peter Paige), and Ted (Scott Lowell); a lesbian couple, Lindsay (Thea Gill) and Melanie (Michelle Clunie); and Michael's mother Debbie (Sharon Gless) and his uncle Vic (Jack Wetherall). Another main character, Ben (Robert Gant), was added in the second season.

== Cast and characters ==
=== Main ===
- Gale Harold as Brian Kinney (British version: Aidan Gillen as Stuart Alan Jones)

Brian Kinney: a veritable sex-machine. At 29 years old, he is living life for the now. He is his own man and believes in having sex for the sheer joy of doing it. While he and Justin have an on-and-off-again relationship, Justin is the only one of his sexual encounters that Brian finds himself falling in love with and the only one he continues to have sex with after the first night. He makes his living as an advertising executive for Vangard, and later on builds his own company, Kinnetik, which was named by Justin. While he purports not to be part of the gay and lesbian community, he will do what he can to protect his fellow gay men and women. His motto when it comes to straight people: "There are two kinds of straight people in the world, those that hate you to your face and those who hate you behind your back."

- Randy Harrison as Justin Taylor (British version: Charlie Hunnam as Nathan Maloney)

Justin loses his virginity to Brian at the age of seventeen and falls in love with him. He runs away from home after coming out of the closet, primarily because his father is not accepting of his sexuality. Nicknamed "Sunshine" by Debbie because of his bright smile and cheery disposition, Justin is queer-bashed at the end of Season 1, resulting in Brian taking him in during Season 2. A talented artist, Justin briefly contemplates attending business school to appease his father but ultimately decides to attend art school to become a visual artist. He and Brian further their relationship over the five seasons, which eventually ends in a marriage proposal. Justin says yes, but Brian tells him to go to New York to pursue his art because he would be more successful there than he would be in Pittsburgh.

- Hal Sparks as Michael Novotny (British version: Craig Kelly as Vince Tyler)

Brian's best friend since adolescence, Michael secretly harbors feelings for him. He enjoys reading comic books, particularly Captain Astro adventures. He starts the series as a manager at a Kmart-like department store, the Big Q, but eventually follows his dream of opening a comic book store. From Season 2, he and Justin create the comic book Rage, based on Brian as the character Rage, Justin as JT (Justin Taylor), who is Rage's lover/sidekick, and Michael as Zephyr, Rage's best friend/sidekick. After a somewhat stormy relationship with older Dr. David Cameron during season 1, Michael finds himself in a long-term relationship with Ben Bruckner, an HIV-positive college professor, beginning in season 2; Michael and Ben eventually marry near the end of season 4.

- Peter Paige as Emmett Honeycutt (British version: Antony Cotton as Alexander Perry)

Originally from Hazlehurst, Mississippi, Emmett is the most flamboyant of the group. He goes through several jobs, including shopkeeper at a clothing store called Torso, porn star, naked maid, party planner, and correspondent for a local news station as well as several relationships during the course of the series.

- Scott Lowell as Ted Schmidt (British version: Jason Merrells as Phil Delaney)

An accountant with low self-esteem who envies Brian's lavish lifestyle, Ted is constantly rejected by men at gay clubs around Pittsburgh and eventually struggles with an addiction to crystal meth. He is a few years older than Michael, Brian, and Emmett. He has a relationship in Season 3 with Emmett as well as an on-again-off-again relationship with Blake.

- Thea Gill as Lindsay Peterson (British version: Esther Hall as Romey Sullivan)

Brian's close friend since college who becomes the mother of his child Gus, Lindsay works as an art teacher but takes time off to care for her son. Lindsay's WASP parents are ashamed of her bisexuality and of her same-sex relationship with Melanie.

- Michelle Clunie as Melanie Marcus (British version: Saira Todd as Lisa Levene)

Lindsay's Jewish partner who works as a lawyer. Melanie dislikes Brian, partially because Lindsay is very affectionate towards him, but she becomes friendlier towards him in later seasons. She carries her and Lindsay's second child, Jenny Rebecca, whose biological father is Michael.

- Robert Gant as Ben Bruckner (seasons 2–5)

A college professor who becomes Michael's long-term partner from Season 2 on, Ben also lives with HIV. Michael's mother, Debbie, at first disapproves of their relationship because she fears that her son will become infected, but eventually she realizes that Michael loves Ben and so she accepts him.

- Sharon Gless as Debbie Novotny (British version: Denise Black as Hazel Tyler)

An active PFLAG member, Debbie is fiercely proud of her son Michael's homosexuality, to the extent of making him embarrassed about it. She treats all the boys as her own family, especially Justin, who briefly lives with her after he runs away from home. She is also one of the people who see past Brian's cockiness for what he really is. She works at the Liberty Diner, and at home she takes care of her ill brother Vic.

- Jack Wetherall as Vic Grassi (British version: Andy Devine as Bernard Thomas)

To help Debbie pay the bills, Vic starts working as a chef at her diner. He also works as a caterer for Emmett's event planning business. Not long after an altercation with Debbie in Season 4, he dies of AIDS complications.

- Chris Potter as Dr. David Cameron (British version: Peter O'Brien as Cameron Roberts) (season 1)

Michael's boyfriend during Season 1. After falling off a ladder, Michael has therapy with David, a chiropractor. Their relationship evolves quickly, and in a few months Michael moves in with David and meets his son. There is friction between David and Brian since David is jealous of Brian's relationship with Michael.

=== Recurring ===
- Harris Allan as James "Hunter" Novotny-Bruckner (seasons 3–5)

Hunter is an HIV-positive teenage hustler who meets Ben and Michael while standing outside their apartment. Ben feels sorry for Hunter and takes him in. Eventually, he and Michael adopt him. Hunter initially has an unrequited crush on Brian but later falls in love with a girl named Callie Leeson.

- Sherry Miller as Jennifer Taylor (British version: Caroline O'Neill as Janice Maloney)

Jennifer is Justin's mother and works as a real estate agent. After having difficulty with her son's coming out, with Debbie's help she embraces the fact that her son is gay, joining PFLAG. After divorcing Craig Taylor, she dates a younger man named Tucker (Lucas Bryant) in season 5, much to Justin's disapproval.

- Peter MacNeill as Carl Horvath (British version: Dave Nicholls as PC Stroud) (seasons 2–5)

Debbie's boyfriend. He meets Debbie while working on a case involving the murder of a young gay man named Jason Kemp. He is slightly homophobic when Debbie first meets him, but she teaches him to be more accepting of homosexuals. He asks Debbie to marry him and she accepts, but she later decides that she cannot marry Horvath as long as Michael cannot legally marry. Instead, the couple decides to live together in a common-law relationship.

- Alec McClure as Chris Hobbs (British version: Ben Maguire as Christian Hobbs) (seasons 1, 2, and 4)

Bully from Justin's school. Justin gives him a hand job early in the series, but he is then revealed to be homophobic. After assaulting Justin with a baseball bat, he is charged with assault and battery and sentenced to community service and probation. He is later shown working in construction, not expressing remorse for his actions until Justin, at Cody's urging, forces him at gunpoint to apologize. Justin plays into Chris's homophobia by claiming that Chris will not report them to the police for fear that people would know he was almost killed by "a couple of sissy fags".

- Stephanie Moore as Cynthia (British version: Alison Burrows as Sandra Docherty)

Brian's assistant. Quits Vangard to follow Brian when he starts his own firm, Kinnetic. Charming enough to dazzle clients and firm enough to handle Brian.

- Dean Armstrong as Blake Wyzecki (British version: Andrew Lancel as Harvey Black)

A crystal meth addict at the time he meets Ted at Babylon. His relationship with Ted ends quickly after Ted finds out that Blake is still hooked on drugs. In Season 4, he is sober and is Ted's counselor at a rehab clinic. They finally reunite in the series finale.

- Makyla Smith as Daphne Chanders (British version: Carla Henry as Donna Clark)

Justin's best friend since high school and the first-person Justin comes out to (not counting Brian or Michael). She asks Justin to take her virginity, since he has experience, and as a result falls in love with him. He quickly turns her down, but they remain friends. Later, they move in together as roommates.

- Nancy Anne Sakovich as Leda (season 2)

Melanie's college girlfriend and best friend. She's a biker and, although Lindsay is rather hostile towards her, soon warms up to her. Later on in season 2, Leda helps rejuvenate Melanie's and Lindsay's sex life when it experiences a drought by having a threesome with them but soon grows further attached.

- Fabrizio Filippo as Ethan Gold (British version: Jonathon Natynczyk as Dazz Collinson) (seasons 2–3)

Music student at PIFA who romances Justin. Feeling neglected by Brian, Justin leaves him for Ethan. It is a short-lived relationship, however, as Ethan cheats on Justin with a fan. Justin leaves Ethan, who had vowed to be faithful, and reunites with Brian, since Justin had never expected Brian to be faithful.

- Matt Battaglia as Drew Boyd (seasons 4–5)

A star quarterback who, although engaged, is a closeted homosexual. He has an affair with Emmett and later leaves his wife to be with him, although they do not stay together. Drew comes out to the media with a controversial on-air kiss with Emmett.

- David Gianopoulos as PC Jim Stockwell (season 3)

A mayoral candidate with Brian as head of his ad campaign. Stockwell is a homophobic police officer who abuses his authority. Initially, Brian helps with the campaign, but at a certain point he decides to sabotage the campaign with Justin's help, as Stockwell is closing the gay nightclubs. Brian launches a smear campaign, and as a result Stockwell loses the election and is indicted.

- Carlo Rota as Gardner Vance (seasons 2–4)

Brian's senior partner at the advertising agency. He buys Ryder's from the previous owner and christens it Vangard, firing every single ad exec but Brian—who proves himself indispensable by going after and signing up the Brown Athletics account that Vance had been after for years. Brian becomes a partner after this and continues to be until the Stockwell smear campaign in season 3, which results in his getting fired.

- Robin Thomas as Sam Auerbach (season 4)

A renowned artist who is notoriously difficult to deal with. He is instantly attracted to Lindsay and pursues her even though she is a lesbian. After his Pittsburgh art exhibit (which Lindsay organized), Lindsay gives in and they have a brief tryst at the gallery.

- Mitch Morris as Cody Bell (season 4)

Leads the "pink posse" and convinces Justin to join.

- Lindsey Connell as Tracey (British version: Caroline Pegg as Rosalie Cotter) (seasons 1–3)

Worked with Michael at the Big Q. She had strong feelings for him and was devastated to find out that he was gay but eventually remained his friend. After Michael left the Big Q to start his comic book store, Tracey made several appearances, including when Ted interviews for the store's assistant bookkeeper position in season 3.

- Meredith Henderson as Callie Leeson (seasons 4–5)

Hunter's high school friend and at one point his girlfriend. When she finds out that he has two fathers and is HIV positive, she is surprisingly not worried. Her parents embarrass Hunter at a swim meet when he hits his head in the pool and begins to bleed. When Callie rushes to the pool to help him, her father shouts that he "has AIDS". The entire room hears, and soon the entire school knows. Callie remains a friend of Hunter and appears occasionally through the remainder of the series.

- Mike Shara as Brett Keller (seasons 4–5)

Hollywood movie producer who offers to produce a movie version of Rage.

- Rosie O'Donnell as Loretta Pye (season 5)

Deb's replacement after she quits the diner so that she and Carl may spend more time together. Loretta applies for the job with no prior experience but convinces Deb to hire her when she tells Deb that she was kicked out of her house by her abusive husband because he caught her making out with her best friend, a woman. After Loretta works at the diner for a couple of weeks, her husband comes to take her home. When she refuses, he tries to drag her out, but Deb comes to the rescue, threatening him with a baseball bat. Afterward, Loretta and Deb become friends, but things go awry when Loretta kisses Deb while they are out for drinks. Deb eventually lets Loretta down gently, and Loretta decides to leave town, saying that she loves Deb too much to be anywhere near her.

== Plot ==
Season	Episodes	Originally released		Rating	Viewers (millions)
Season	Episodes	First released	Last released	Rating	Viewers (millions)
1	22	December 3, 2000	May 20, 2001	0.86	1.362
2	20	January 6, 2002	June 16, 2002	0.79	1.244
3	14	March 2, 2003	June 22, 2003	0.71	1.086
4	14	April 18, 2004	July 18, 2004	0.34	0.504
5	13	May 22, 2005	August 7, 2005	0.30	0.440

The first episode finds the four friends ending a night at Babylon, a popular gay club. Brian picks up and has sex with Justin, who falls in love with him and eventually becomes more than a one-night stand. Brian also becomes a father that night, bearing a son with Lindsay through artificial insemination.

Michael's seemingly unrequited love for Brian fuels the story, which he occasionally narrates in voice-over. Justin's coming out and the budding relationship with Brian has unexpected effects on Brian and Michael's lives, much to Michael's dismay, as Justin is only 17 years old. Justin confides in his straight high-school friend Daphne while struggling to deal with homophobic classmates and his dismayed, divorcing parents, Craig and Jennifer. Later in the second season, Justin and Michael co-create the sexually explicit underground comic Rage, featuring a "Gay Crusader" superhero based on Brian.

Brian's son Gus, being raised by Lindsay and Melanie, becomes the focus of several episodes, as issues of parental rights come to the fore. Ted is Melanie's accountant who once harbored a long-standing crush on Michael. He and Emmett begin as best friends but briefly become lovers later in the series. Their relationship ends as Ted, unemployed and with a criminal record earned from running a legitimate porn website that was targeted by a chief of police running for mayor, becomes addicted to crystal meth.

In the fourth season, Brian, who has lost his job by assisting Justin in opposing an anti-gay political client, starts his own agency. He also discovers he has testicular cancer and hides his treatment from his friends. Michael marries Ben Bruckner, an HIV-positive college professor, and the couple adopts a teenage son, James "Hunter" Montgomery, who is also HIV-positive as a result of his experiences as a young hustler.

Ted's affair with a handsome crystal meth addict, Blake Wyzecki, sets the pattern for Ted's later tragic but ultimately redeeming experiences with drug addiction.

Melanie and Lindsay's relationship, while on the surface seeming to be stable, is actually quite tumultuous. Each cheats on the other at various points in the series; both partake in a threesome shortly after they marry but are separated for much of the fourth and fifth seasons. Melanie is impregnated by Michael (through artificial insemination, as Lindsay was) in the third season, and thus best friends Brian and Michael become co-fathers to Lindsay and Melanie's children.

Melanie gives birth to a girl, Jenny Rebecca, over whom Melanie, Lindsay, and Michael have a brief legal custody battle following the women's transitory breakup. Brian's new advertising agency, Kinnetik, becomes highly successful, through a combination of Brian's customer loyalty and his edgier advertising. As a result, Brian is able to purchase Club Babylon from its bankrupt owner.

In the fifth and final season the boys have become men, and the series, perhaps more comfortable in its role in gay entertainment, tackles political issues head-on and with much more fervor.

A political campaign called "Proposition 14" is depicted during much of the final season as a looming threat to the main characters. This proposition, like so many real-life recent legislative moves that have affected many U.S. states, threatens to outlaw same-sex marriage, adoption, and other family civil rights. The many ways in which such a proposition would affect the characters are depicted in nearly every episode.

Debbie, Justin, Jennifer, Daphne, Emmett, Ted, Michael, Ben, Lindsay, Melanie, and the children stand up and fight against this proposition via active canvassing, political contributions, and other democratic processes, but they are met with staunch opposition, discrimination, outright hatred, and political setbacks.

The show climaxes near the end of the series when a benefit to support opposition to Proposition 14 hosted at Brian's club Babylon (after repeated relocations of the benefit owing to discrimination) is attacked by a bomb that initially kills four people (and eventually another three) and injures 67.

This horrible event sets the bittersweet tone for the final three episodes, in which Brian, frightened by this third possible loss of Justin, finally declares his love for him. The two even plan to marry, but Justin's artistic abilities get noticed by a New York art critic and the two decide, for the time being at least, in favor of a more realistic approach to a stormy relationship that nevertheless works for their characters. Melanie and Lindsay, realizing they have more in common than not, resume their relationship but relocate to Canada to "raise [their children] in an environment where they will not be called names, singled out for discrimination, or ever have to fear for their life."

Emmett becomes a Queer-Eye type TV presenter but is later fired when professional football player Drew Boyd kisses him on the news to signify his coming out. Ted confronts his midlife crisis head-on and finally reunites with Blake. Hunter returns and the Novotny-Bruckner family perseveres.

The series came full circle with the final scenes staged in the restored Babylon nightclub. In the final scene, Brian dances to Heather Small's "Proud", a song that accompanied a pivotal scene between Brian and Michael in the very first episode of the series. It ends with a final narration by Michael:

So the "thumpa thumpa" continues. It always will. No matter what happens. No matter who's president. As our lady of Disco, the divine Miss Gloria Gaynor has always sung to us: We will survive.

== Reception ==
=== Awards and nominations ===
Awards and nominations received by Queer as Folk
Year	Award	Category	Nominee(s)	Result	Ref.
2002	Directors Guild of Canada	DGC Craft Award for Outstanding Achievement in Direction	Jeremy Podeswa (for episode "#116")	Nominated	
2002	Directors Guild of Canada	DGC Team Award for Outstanding Achievement in a Television Series – Drama	Queer as Folk production team (for episode "#116")	Nominated	
2003	Directors Guild of Canada	DGC Craft Award for Outstanding Achievement in Direction – Television Series	Kelly Makin (for episode "#305")	Nominated	
2003	Directors Guild of Canada	DGC Craft Award for Outstanding Achievement in Picture Editing – Short Form	Wendy Hallam Martin (for episode "#220")	Nominated	
2003	Directors Guild of Canada	DGC Craft Award for Outstanding Achievement in Production Design – Short Form	Ingrid Jurek (for episode "#305")	Nominated	
2003	Directors Guild of Canada	DGC Craft Award for Outstanding Achievement in Sound Editing – Short Form	Sue Conley, Mishann Lau and Dale Sheldrake (for episode "#216")	Won	
2003	Directors Guild of Canada	DGC Team Award for Outstanding Achievement in a Television Series – Drama	Queer as Folk production team (for episode "#305")	Won	
2004	Directors Guild of Canada	DGC Craft Award for Outstanding Achievement in Picture Editing – Television Series	Wendy Hallam Martin	Nominated	
2004	Directors Guild of Canada	DGC Craft Award for Outstanding Achievement in Production Design – Television Series	Ingrid Jurek (for episode "#401")	Nominated	
2004	Writers Guild of Canada	WGC Award for Drama Series	Michael MacLennan (teleplay/story), Ron Cowen and Daniel Lipman (story) (for episode "302")	Nominated	
2004	Writers Guild of Canada	WGC Award for Drama Series	Shawn Postoff (teleplay/story), Ron Cowen and Daniel Lipman (story) (for episode "310")	Nominated	
2004	Writers Guild of Canada	WGC Award for Drama Series	Michael MacLennan (teleplay/story), Ron Cowen and Daniel Lipman (story) (for episode "312")	Nominated	
2005	Directors Guild of Canada	DGC Craft Award for Outstanding Achievement in Production Design – Television Series	Ingrid Jurek (for episode "#408")	Won	
2005	Directors Guild of Canada	DGC Craft Award for Outstanding Achievement in Picture Editing – Television Series	Wendy Hallam Martin (for episode "#501")	Won	
2005	Directors Guild of Canada	DGC Team Award for Outstanding Team Achievement in a Television Series – Drama	Queer as Folk production team (for episode "#501")	Nominated	
2005	Writers Guild of Canada	WGC Award for Drama Series	Shawn Postoff (teleplay/story), Ron Cowen and Daniel Lipman (story) (for episode "4.9")	Nominated	
2006	Directors Guild of Canada	DGC Craft Award for Outstanding Production Design – Television Series	Ingrid Jurek (for episode "#510")	Nominated	
2006	Directors Guild of Canada	DGC Craft Award for Outstanding Sound Editing – Television Series	Mishann Lau, Dale Sheldrake and Sue Conley (for episode "#510")	Nominated	

== Cultural implications ==
The American version of Queer as Folk quickly became the number one show on the Showtime roster. The network's initial marketing of the show was primarily targeted at gay male (and to some extent, lesbian) audiences, yet a sizable segment of the viewership turned out to be heterosexual women.

Groundbreaking scenes abounded in Queer as Folk beginning with the first episode, which depicts the first sex scene between two men shown on American television (including manual sex, anal sex, and anilingus), though not as graphically as the scene in the UK version that it was based on.

Despite the frank portrayals of drug use and casual sex in the gay club scene, the expected right-wing uproar (aside from some token opposition) never materialized. Cowen and Lipman, however, admitted in 2015 that they were surprised by a backlash from some quarters of the LGBT community, fearing negative implications that may result from the show.

Controversial storylines explored in Queer as Folk have included the following: coming out, same-sex marriage, ex-gay ministries, recreational drug use and abuse (cocaine, methamphetamine, ecstasy, GHB, ketamine, cannabis); gay adoption, artificial insemination, vigilantism, autoerotic asphyxiation, gay-bashing, safe sex, HIV/AIDS, casual sex, cruising, "the baths", serodiscordancy in relationships, underage prostitution, actively gay Catholic priests, discrimination in the workplace based on sexual orientation, the internet pornography industry, and bug chasers (HIV-negative individuals who actively seek to become HIV-positive).

The series at times made humorous references to its image in the gay community. A few episodes featured the show-within-a-show Gay as Blazes, a cheesy, dull, badly acted, and abundantly politically correct drama which Brian particularly disagreed with, and which was eventually canceled.

=== Cultural implications in the Asian context ===
Acting as one of the pioneering dramas depicting gay characters from a complex perspective, alternative media and platforms within Asia had also adopted the drama. In South Korea the Queer film festivals (first labeled as a "scandal" in 1998) were slowly accepted and even popularised across South Korean society. Queer as Folk played a significant role when it was screened during the festival in 2000, providing the queer community with a way to challenge heteronormativity in Korean society.

=== Cast's real-life sexual orientation ===
The actors' real-life sexual orientation has been the subject of speculation by the public. In a 2015 Queer as Folk reunion, actors Gale Harold and Scott Lowell said they refused to discuss their own sexuality in the press, at least during the show's first season, in an effort to lessen distractions, which was corroborated by Lipman, who went on to say that during the show's first season, even he did not know their real-life sexuality.

In an interview on CNN's Larry King Live on April 24, 2002, show host Larry King described Randy Harrison and Peter Paige as gay, and Michelle Clunie, Robert Gant, Thea Gill, Gale Harold, Scott Lowell, and Hal Sparks as straight.

Three months after the interview on Larry King Live, Gant came out as gay in an article on The Advocate.

In 2004, Gill, married to director Brian Richmond at the time, came out as a bisexual in an interview with Windy City Times.

Meanwhile, Sharon Gless's life as a woman married to a man was already well known by the time Queer as Folk was in production, as she had married Barney Rosenzweig in 1991. She has been described as a straight woman.

In the years since Queer as Folk ended, Harold, Harrison, Lowell, Paige and Sparks have openly discussed their sexual orientation in gay publications.

== Setting ==
The series was set in the city of Pittsburgh, Pennsylvania, which is depicted with a good deal of creative license; one example is the numerous references made to the Susquehanna River, which flows in the eastern and central parts of Pennsylvania whereas Pittsburgh is in the west. Pittsburgh was chosen as the closest parallel to the UK series' industrial setting of Manchester, England. However, since Pittsburgh does not have a large gay district like San Francisco or New York City, almost all of the Liberty Avenue scenes were filmed in and around the Church and Wellesley area of Toronto, which is that city's gay village. In fact, not a single shot of the real Liberty Avenue was ever used in the series. Toronto was chosen as the production center of the series because of its lower cost of production and established mature television and film industry. And, as it happens, Toronto's gay village had the look the producers needed to bring their vision of Liberty Avenue alive.

Woody's, the central bar in this fantasy Pittsburgh, is the name of a leading gay bar in Toronto, whose real exterior was shot with only minor disguise. (In a Season 4 episode in which several characters traveled to Toronto, the real Woody's was dubbed "Moosie's".) Babylon was also the name of a real gay bar in Toronto, which was open during the show's run but subsequently closed, although the real establishment was a sitdown martini bar; the dance club scenes in the series were actually filmed at a different Toronto nightclub, Fly.

== International and online release ==
- United States
  - From February 1, 2014, to February 1, 2019, the entire series was available for online streaming via Netflix. Since 2020, it has been available on Paramount+.
- Canada
  - In Canada, the series aired in first run on Showcase, and still airs in reruns on OutTV.
- United Kingdom
  - Season 1 was broadcast by the BBC on its digital channel BBC Choice in 2002. Seasons 3 and 4 were broadcast by Channel 4's digital channel E4 in an unpromoted post-midnight slot (Channel 4 was the broadcaster of the British series). While the BBC still holds the rights to Season 2, it has never been broadcast since BBC Choice was rebranded BBC Three and its remit was changed. All five seasons have been released on DVD in the UK; Seasons 1 and 2 were first released exclusively through HMV, but are now also available as part of a boxed set and separately from Amazon.
- Europe:
  - In Norway, the first season started on March 31, 2006, on Canal Digital.
  - In Romania the show started airing in late 2008 on a gay-themed network, Purple TV.
  - In Poland the show began airing on March 1, 2010, on nFilmHD at 11:00 pm.
  - In Greece, only the first season of the show was aired on Star Channel in 2002. The first season was repeated on the same channel in 2003, but the rest of the seasons were not broadcast in the country. The Greek title of the show was "Anamesa Mas" (Between Us).
- Asia:
  - In Israel the show was aired on Channel 3 and yes stars channels. Currently the show reruns on HOT3. Owing to linguistic problems, it was renamed "הכי גאים שיש" ("Hachi Ge'im SheYesh"; lit. "Proud As Can Be").

== See also ==
- The L Word
- Looking (TV series)
