= Christopher Richards =

Canadian writer

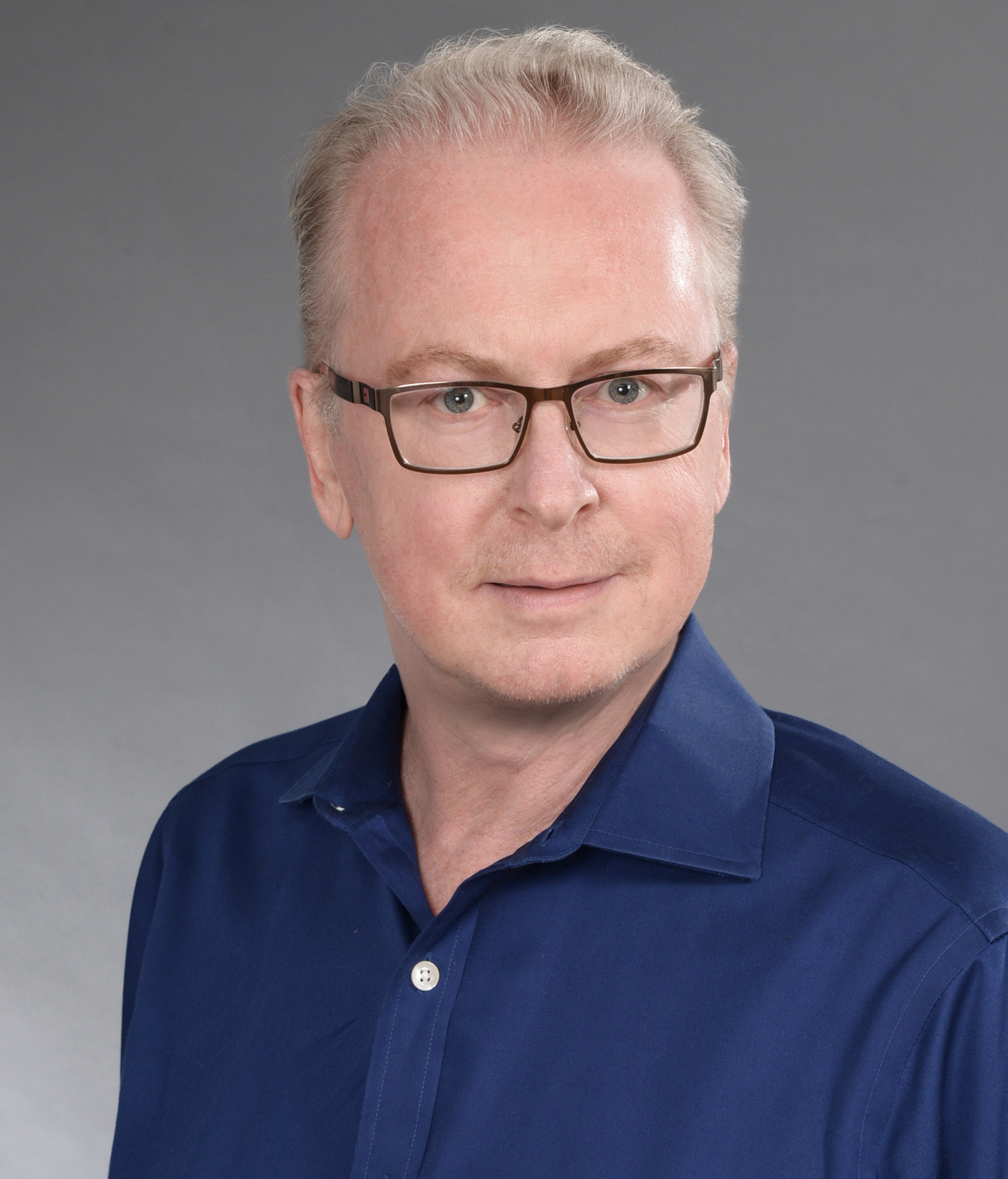
- Christopher Richards 2018
- Born: November 29, 1961 (age 64); Scarborough, Ontario
- Occupations: actor, playwright & theatre designer

David Christopher Richards, best known as Christopher Richards (born November 29, 1961) is a Canadian playwright, theatre designer and casting director.

== Life and career ==
Born in Scarborough, Ontario, Richards grew up in Markham and later Astorville. He studied acting at York University between 1982 and 1986, working as a dresser at the Stratford Shakespeare Festival during summer breaks.

After graduating from York in 1986, Richards formed a drag troupe, The BoHo Girls. Taking on the mantle of artistic director and designer, Richards honed a style of visual comedy which would inform later works. In 1994, Richards and John Wimbs Jr. authored Molly Wood, a full-length play about Alexander Wood. Initially thought of as a vehicle for the BoHo Girls, Molly Wood developed into a full-length theatrical production after the depth of the subject matter was fully researched. Opening at the Bathurst Street Theatre, Molly Wood garnered Richards Dora Awards for Outstanding New Play and Outstanding Production of a Play, Large Theatre division in 1995.

Following the break-up of the BoHo Girls, Richards began collaborating with a group of Toronto comedians, Lisa Lambert, Paul O'Sullivan and Jonathan Crombie among them, whose efforts produced a series of mini-musicals. The end result of this creative teaming was The Drowsy Chaperone. The Drowsy Chaperone was first staged at The Rivoli in 1998, followed by a run at the Toronto Fringe Festival in 1999. Writing in Variety, Mira Friedlander cited the production values of this version as incentive for further productions. The Variety article caught the attention of Mirvish Productions and the musical was again staged at the Theatre Passe Muraille in 1999. Richards was nominated for a Dora Award for his costume designs on this production. The Drowsy Chaperone was then added to the Mirvish subscription series with a production at Toronto's Winter Garden in 2002. The Drowsy Chaperone went on to a successful broadway run in 2006 at the Marquis Theatre.

Throughout the 1990s Richards was a frequent contributor to Xtra!. For the last 20 years Richards has worked in casting film and TV.

In 2018, Richards and co-writer Gordon Bowness mounted a Toronto Fringe Festival musical production of "The Ding Dong Girls" with songs by Lisa Lambert at the Factory Theatre.

== Plays and Musicals ==
- Molly Wood (1994), Lovers & Madmen, directed by Ned Vukovic
- The Ding Dong Girls (2018), Toronto Fringe Festival, co-written with Gordon Bowness, Songs by Lisa Lambert

== Drag Shows ==
- All-Beehive Revue Salute to Mother's Day (1989) Pimblett's
- Multi-Medea (1889) 249 A Gerrard Street, Rooftop
- Make-over Massacre (1989) Pimblett's
- The X-mas Show (1989) Chaps
- Beach Party BoHo (1990) Chaps
- Scary-Boo BoHo (1990) Chaps
- The Greatest BoHo Story Ever Told (1991) Chaps
- Go-Go Mary (1991) Buddies in Bad Times (George Street)
- Vive Lava Difference (1991) Chaps
- Lost In Time (1994) Chaps
- Secret Agent Show (1995) Woody's
- Pooky Goes to Hell (1995) Woody's
- Lady Winter (1996) Woody's
- Pooky Goes to Hell (1996) The Rivoli

== Costume Design ==
- Molly Wood (1994) Lover's & Madmen, Bathurst Street Theatre
- The Misfit (1995) Lovers & Madmen, Bathurst Street Theatre
- Rock That Rainbow (1996) Brock & John Productions, The Rivoli
- Short Leave (1997) Brock & John Productions, The Rivoli
- The Drowsy Chaperone (1998) The Rivoli
- The Drowsy Chaperone (1999) The Toronto Fringe Festival, The George Ignatieff Theatre
- The Drowsy Chaperone (1999) John Karastimatis, Theatre Passe Muraille
- The Drowsy Chaperone (2002) Mirvish Productions, Winter Garden
- This Could Be Love (2003) Brock Simpson, The Poor Alex
- The Ding Dong Girls (2018), Toronto Fringe Festival

== Awards ==
- 1995 Dora Mavor Moore Award Outstanding New Play or Musical - Molly Wood
- 1995 Dora Mavor Moore Award Best Production of a Play or Musical - Molly Wood
- 2018 Patron's Pick Award (Bathurst Street Theatre) Toronto Fringe - The Ding Dong Girls

== Nominations ==
- 2000 Dora Mavor Moore Award Outstanding Costume Design - The Drowsy Chaperone

== Casting Director ==
- 2016 to present- Baroness von Sketch Show
