= Church and Wellesley =

LGBT-oriented settlement in Canada

- Neighbourhood
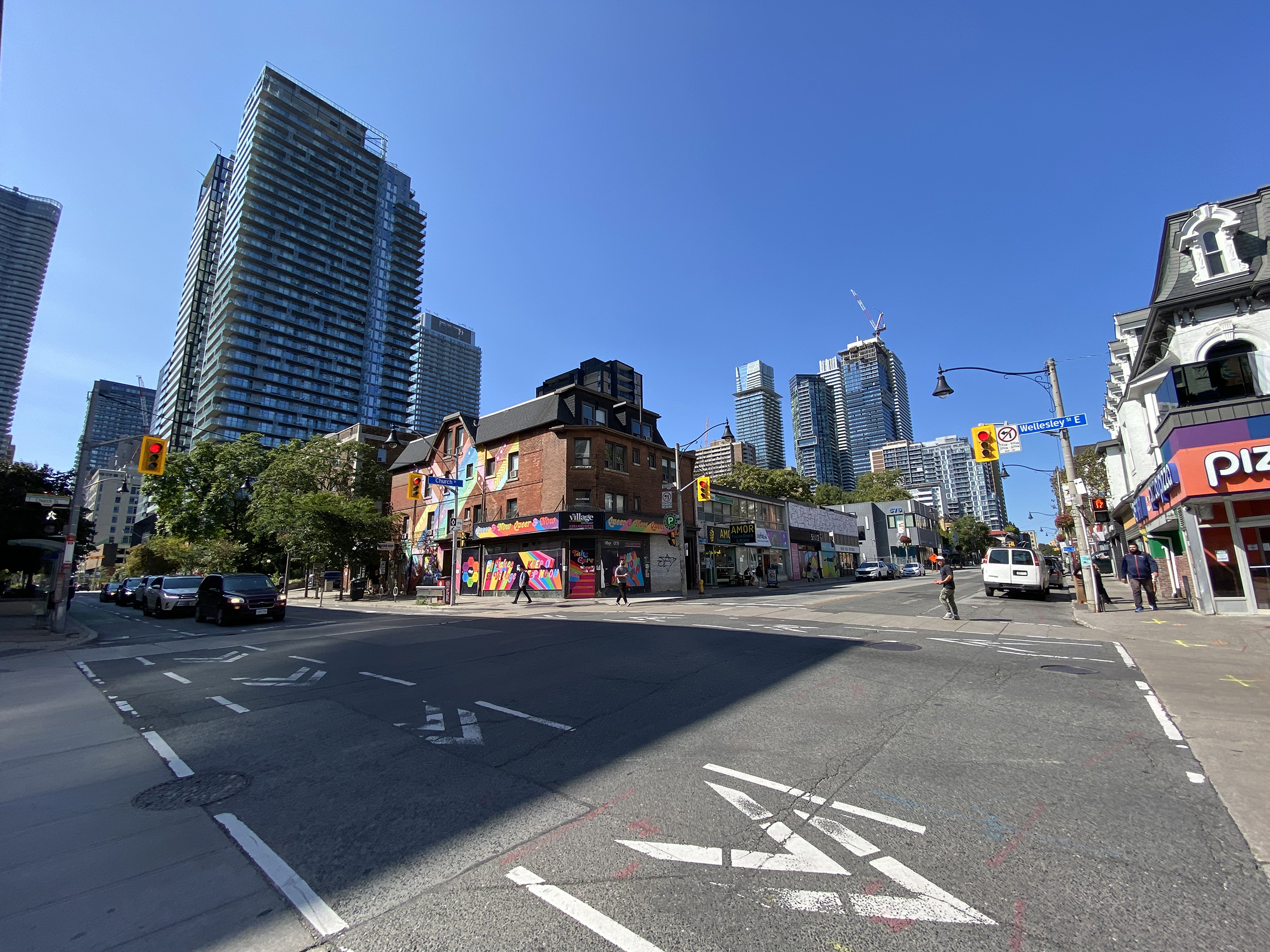
- View of the Village looking north from Church and Wellesley Street in 2023

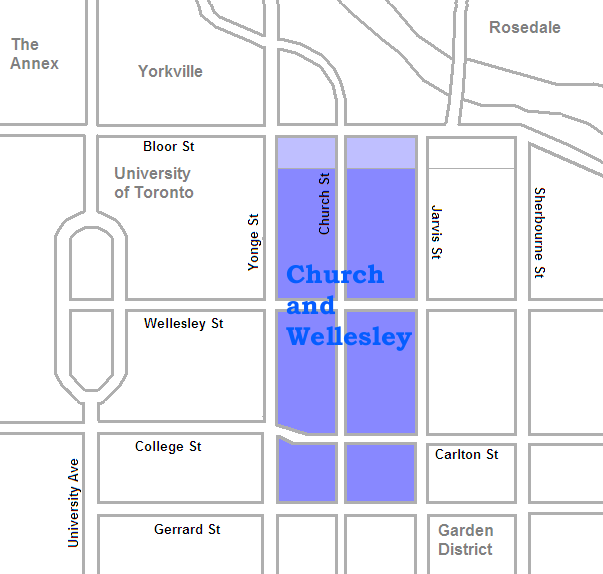
- Map of the neighbourhood. The office towers along Bloor are generally not considered part of the village
- Coordinates: 43°39′56″N 79°22′51″W
- Country: Canada
- Province: Ontario
- City: Toronto

Government
  - Type: Ward 13 of Toronto City Council
  - City councillor: Chris Moise

Area
  - Total: 0.683 km^{2} (0.264 sq mi)

Population (2021)
  - Total: 26,163
  - Density: 38,306/km^{2} (99,210/sq mi)
- Time zone: UTC-5 (EST)
  - Summer (DST): UTC-4 (EDT)

Church and Wellesley is an LGBT-oriented enclave in Toronto, Ontario, Canada. It is roughly bounded by Gerrard Street to the south, Yonge Street to the west, Charles Street to the north, and Jarvis Street to the east, with the core commercial strip located along Church Street from Wellesley south to Alexander. Though some LGBT-oriented establishments can be found outside this area, the general boundaries of this village have been defined by the Gay Toronto Tourism Guild.

== Overview ==
While the neighbourhood is home to the community centre, parks, bars, restaurants, and stores catering to the LGBT community (particularly along Church Street), it is also a historic community with Victorian houses and apartments dating back to the late 19th and early 20th century. Many LGBT people also live in the nearby residential neighbourhoods of The Annex, Cabbagetown, St. James Town, St. Lawrence, Riverdale and the Garden District, and in smaller numbers throughout the city and its suburbs.

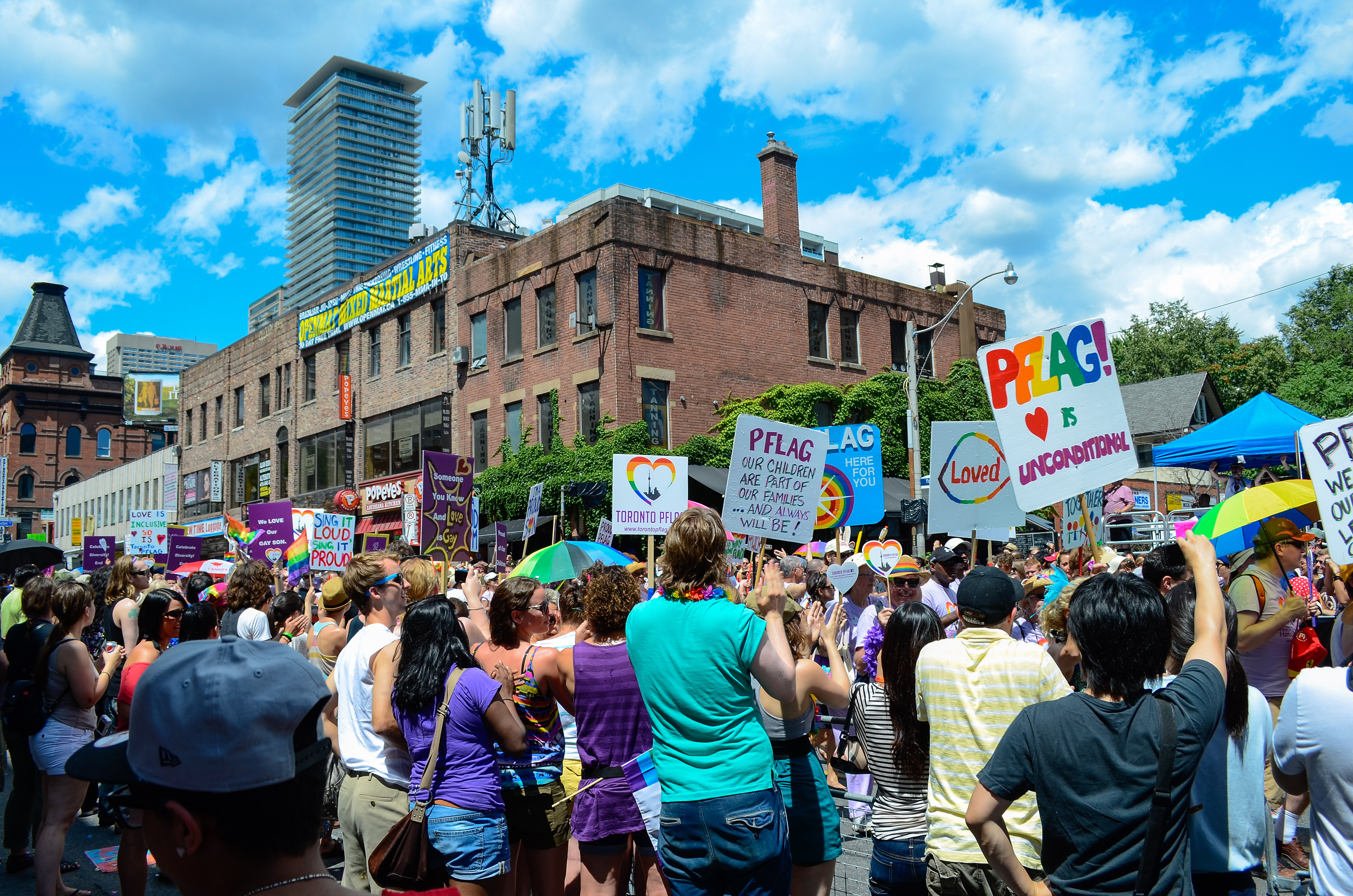
Church and Wellesley is home to the annual Pride Toronto celebrations.

Church and Wellesley is home to the annual Pride Toronto celebrations, the largest event of its kind in Canada with over 90 floats and an enthusiastic crowd that numbers in the hundreds of thousands. The main Pride Toronto festival and parade is always on the last weekend in June, although a program of Pride-related events is held throughout the month of June. The Pride Parade takes place on Sunday and runs southward along Yonge Street. The Dyke March is a dyke and lesbian grassroots march that runs on the Saturday afternoon and typically ends in Allan Gardens for a community fair and Dyke Stage entertainment. The trans march and fair open up the weekend, with the trans march taking place the Friday evening. There is also a weekend-long community fair that closes off Wellesley between Yonge and Church and stretches down Church Street to Dundas. The community fair includes tables from a wide variety of groups involved in or associated with queer culture and services.

The 519 Church Street Community Centre is the meeting place for numerous social and political groups and became well known as an LGBT-friendly space. "The 519", as it is most often called, is a city-run community centre that has been adopted locally as the queer community centre, though its programming is not exclusive to LGBT groups and organizations. In 2007, a new wing was opened, and upgrades to the existing spaces were completed in 2009.

Church and Wellesley is also home to the AIDS Memorial, and the Trans Memorial located in Barbara Hall Park, where the names of members of the community who have been lost to AIDS are etched into bronze plaques. A memorial candlelight vigil is held each year at the AIDS Memorial, during Pride Week.

Buddies in Bad Times is a theatre within the enclave dedicated to "the promotion of queer theatrical expression."

=== Alternate names ===
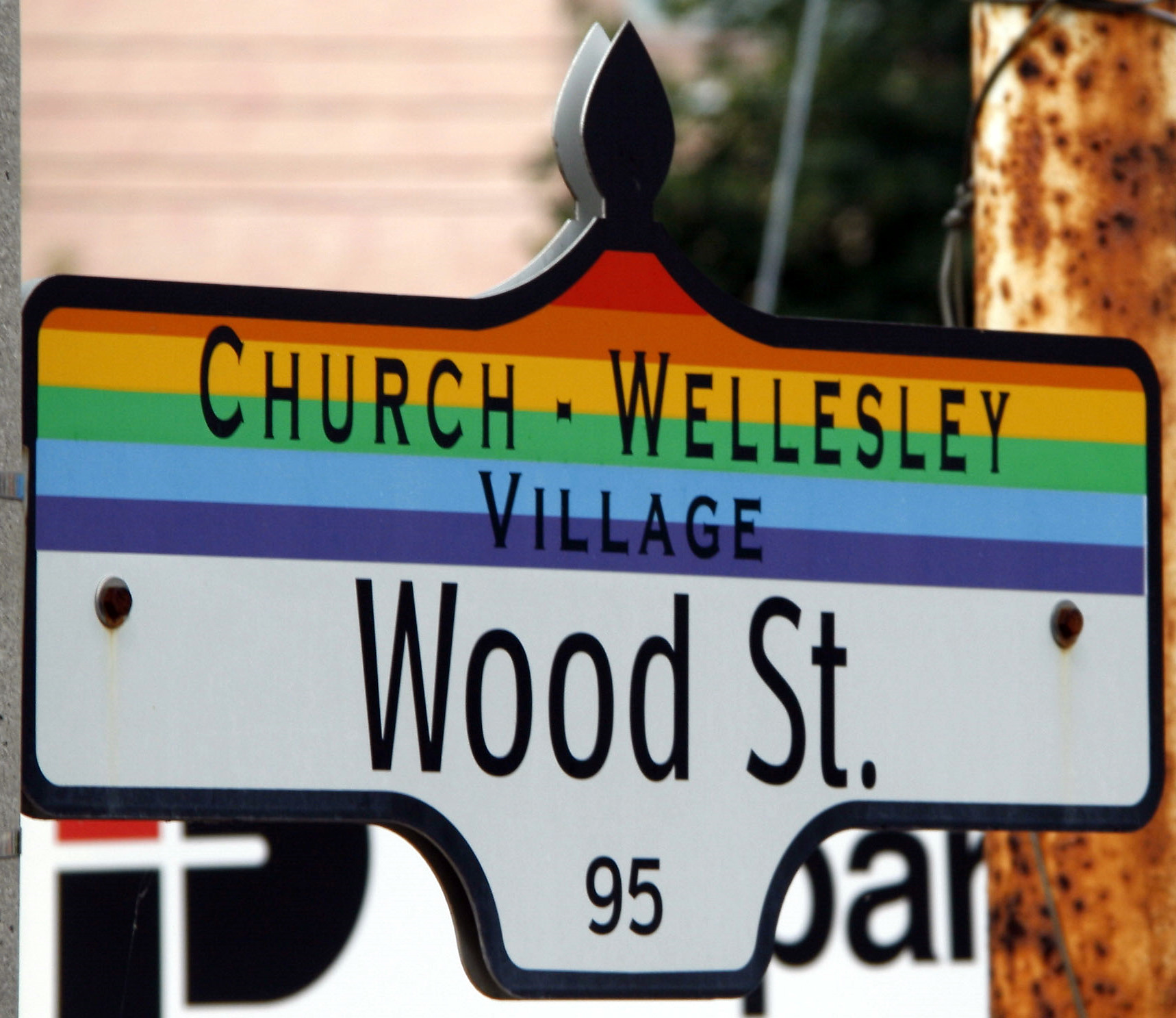
The neighbourhood goes by a number of names, though most refer to it as Church Street or the Village.

A number of alternative names for Church and Wellesley exist in local vernacular, including the Gay Ghetto, the Village, the Gaybourhood or the Gay Village — however, many of these "nicknames" are generic to gay villages across the English speaking world, and are therefore not descriptive of Church and Wellesley specifically, but of gay villages in general. Most people refer to it simply as Church Street or the Village, since most of the LGBT-related establishments in the area are located on that street.

=== Business association ===
The Church Wellesley Village Business Improvement Area was established October 2002.

In the summer of 2004, the business association launched a pilot project. Every Sunday from 10 a.m. to 10 p.m. throughout the summer, two blocks of Church Street, from Wellesley south to Alexander, were closed to traffic to encourage more pedestrian activity. However, this proved controversial when some business owners accused other businesses of "stealing" customers by providing street entertainment, and ended three weeks earlier than planned due to a lack of money.

The business association also sponsored the Church Street Fetish Fair in August. In 2003, San Francisco's Folsom Street Fair had licensed a consortium of Toronto community groups to use the name Folsom Fair North for a similar fetish fair. That fair was held in a large parking lot near the corner of Wellesley and Yonge in 2003 and 2004, and in Allan Gardens in 2005, and the "Church Street Fetish Fair" was widely perceived as retaliation for the Folsom fair not being held on Church Street itself. Folsom Fair North, which changed its name to FFN in 2006, was last held in 2007.

== History ==
The portion of the neighbourhood bounded by Yonge, Jarvis, Maitland and Carlton Streets was once the estate of Alexander Wood, a merchant and magistrate in Upper Canada who was at the centre of a strange, supposedly sexually related scandal in 1810. His lands were derisively known as "Molly Wood's Bush" in the early nineteenth century — "molly" being a pejorative term for an effeminate or gay man. In the spring of 2005, a statue of Wood was erected at the corner of Church and Alexander Streets (the latter named for Wood), honouring him as a forefather of Toronto's modern gay community.

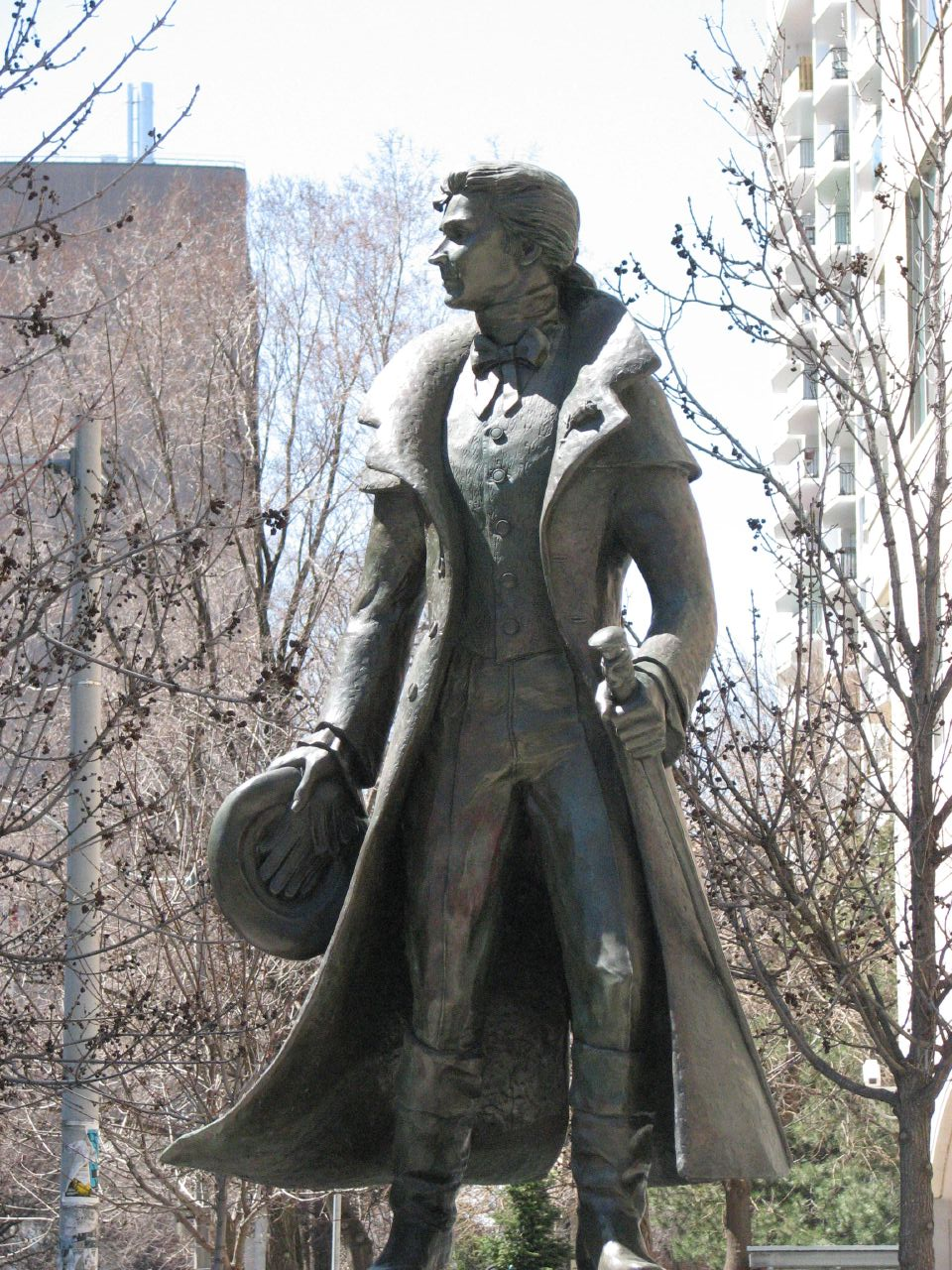
Statue of Alexander Wood in the neighbourhood. A lieutenant in the Canadian militia who was later involved in a homophobic scandal, he is now lauded as a forefather of Toronto's gay community.

Church Street and the area around it has been familiar to the Toronto gay community for many decades. Prior to the 1970s there had been an underground (mostly male) gay scene centred on various bathhouses and bars around the city that were not exclusively gay establishments but were known to be frequented by homosexuals. Allan Gardens, just east of Church Street on Carlton, was a well-known cruising area for gay men.

From the late 1960s through the early 1980s the focus of Toronto's gay subculture was the Yonge and Wellesley area. The most notable bars for the gay subculture were the Parkside Tavern and the St. Charles Tavern on Yonge Street (one block west of Church) just south of Wellesley. During the 1970s, the St. Charles in particular was the focus of many attacks by homophobes, especially on Halloween when the tavern held an annual drag contest that had been proceeded by an outdoor promenade until attacks by homophobes hurling eggs and rotten fruit made that impossible. The Glad Day Bookshop, for many years the city's only gay oriented bookstore, opened on Yonge Street near Wellesley in the mid-1970s. There were also a number of gay-oriented businesses and clubs on the side streets running west off of Yonge street around Wellesley, in particular St. Nicholas Street, a laneway running behind the west side of Yonge, and St. Joseph Street, one block north of Wellesley running west off Yonge. The streets and alleys between Yonge and Bay also became a cruising area frequented by male prostitutes and their clients referred to by the police as "Track two".

Church Street, one block east of Yonge, had been a depressed area with low rents and started to become a predominantly gay area as gay owned bars and other businesses started opening up as an alternative to the straight owned Parkside and St. Charles Taverns whose owners were accused of being hostile of their gay clientele.

The centre of the gay life in Toronto shifted to Church Street following the 1981 Toronto bathhouse raids, an event that galvanized the gay and lesbian community in the city. George Hislop, a gay businessman and co-owner of one of the raided bathhouses, ran for Toronto City Council with his campaign headquarters located at Church and Wellesley.

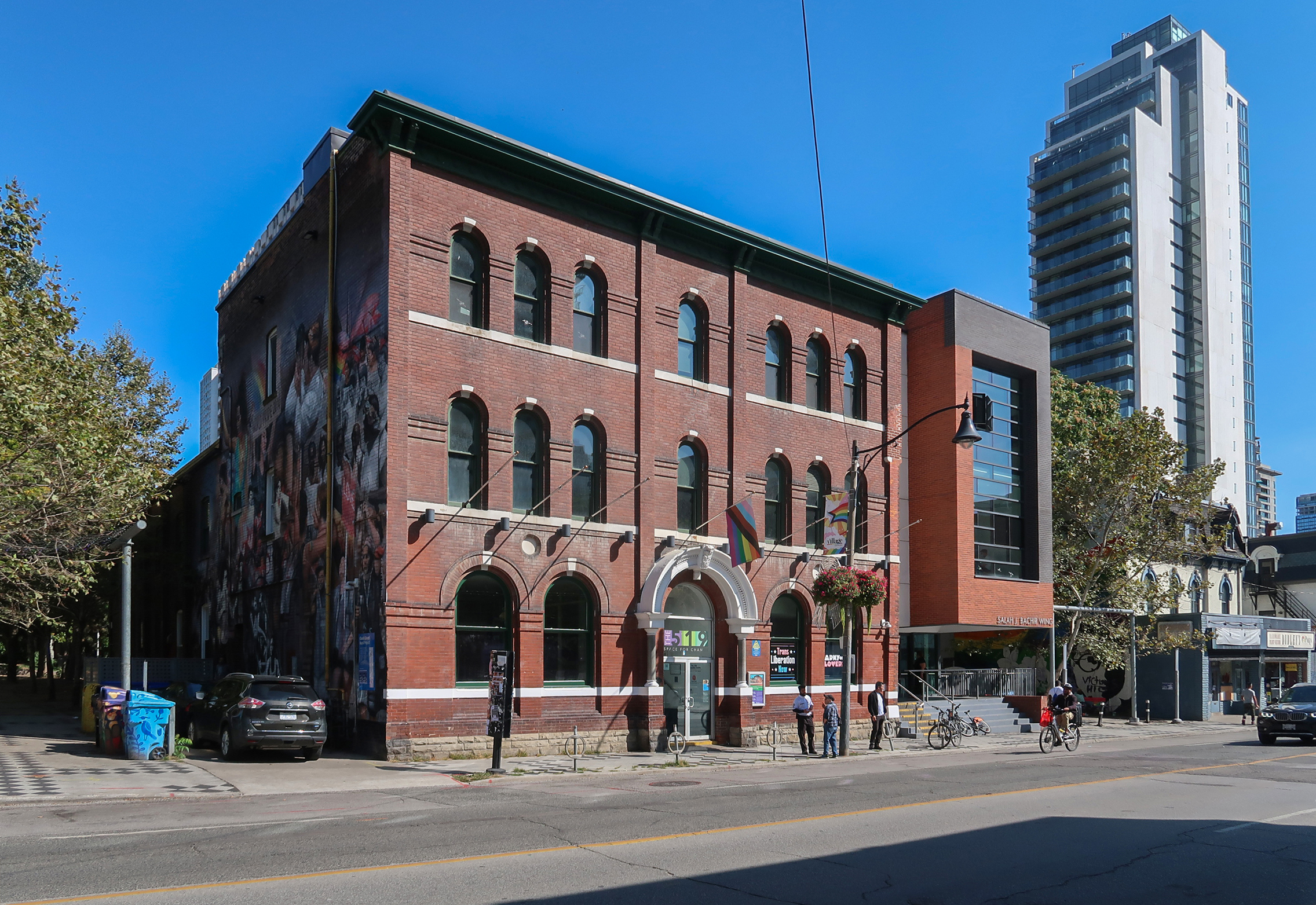
519 Church Street Community Centre became a meeting place for numerous social and political groups in the area beginning in the 1980s.

In the 1980s, the 519 Church Street Community Centre became the meeting place for numerous social and political groups and became well known as an LGBT friendly space. A strip of gay bars opened along the street and many LGBT people rented apartments, joined residential co-ops or bought condos close to Church. The area became known as a friendly environment where people could be open about their sexual orientation.

=== Uncertain future ===
As times have changed and Toronto public has become more open to homosexuality, the role of Church and Wellesley as a "sanctuary" for LGBT people has been debated in recent years. Many bars and clubs throughout Toronto are now gay-friendly and many popular destinations for young gay and lesbian club-goers are located outside the traditional gay village.

Rental rates for both commercial and residential property have also risen significantly. In the 2000s, many privately owned businesses, including This Ain't the Rosedale Library, have been forced to close down or move to other areas due to these rent increases, and much larger corporations, such as Starbucks, The Body Shop, David's Tea, Subway and the Bank of Montreal, have settled on the street in their place. The Priape chain of gay porn and clothing stores closed its Church Street and other locations in October 2013 when it filed for bankruptcy; its former location remained vacant for over five years before finally being taken over by Friendly Stranger, a cannabis shop, in 2020. Many smaller gay-owned businesses have moved to cheaper areas such as Cabbagetown, located east of Church and Wellesley.

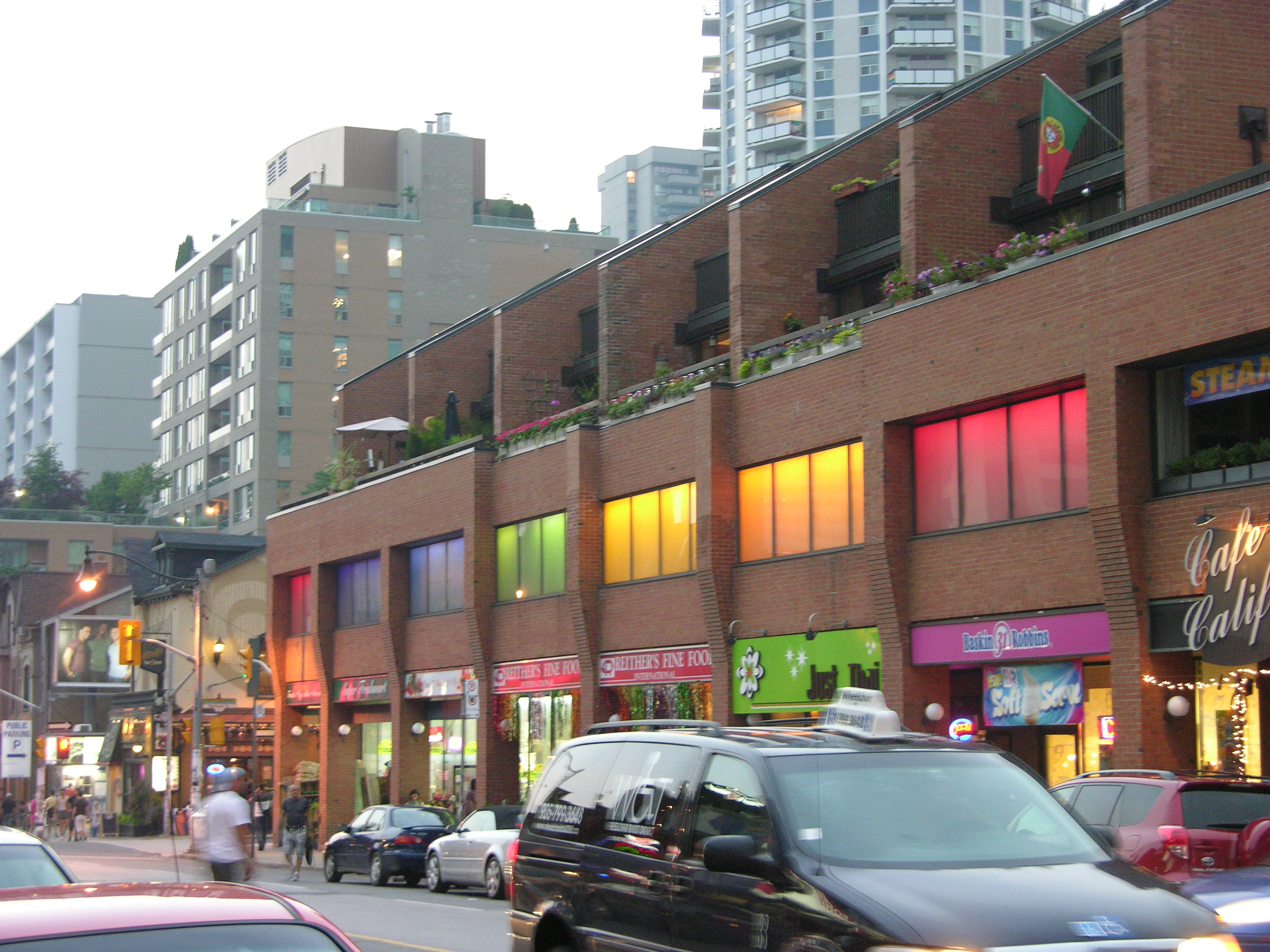
The first decade of the 21st century saw a number of privately owned businesses close in Church and Wellesley, with larger corporations taking their place.

The residents of the area are now largely middle-aged men with established careers, as the high rents and increasing density of condominium development mean that the majority of gay youth cannot afford to live in the neighbourhood. Some choose to settle in nearby neighbourhoods such as St. James Town and Cabbagetown, while others no longer feel it necessary to live near the village as they can be open about their sexuality without as much fear of backlash. Many in the gay community have expressed concern about the decline of the neighbourhood's appeal with youth and its loss of small businesses. Other downtown neighbourhoods much farther afield from Church and Wellesley, including Parkdale, Trinity-Bellwoods, Riverdale and Leslieville, are also now popular areas for LGBT residents; Parkdale in particular has even earned the nickname of "Queer West Village" in recent years.

In 2013, a partnership of community organizations, including The 519 and the Church-Wellesley Business Improvement Association, launched a community survey to solicit ideas for community revitalization. Questions posed by the study included "What is the role of an 'LGBTQ village' in a modern, progressive city?" and "What must be done to support the Church-Wellesley Village to solidify its role as a major cultural community hub in the Toronto context now and into the future?"

A rainbow crossing was installed in 2014, and a trans pride crosswalk was installed in 2019.

== Politics ==
=== Federal ===
The neighbourhood is part of the federal electoral district of Toronto Centre, currently represented in the House of Commons by Evan Solomon of the Liberal Party of Canada. Previous representatives have included Marci Ien, Bill Morneau, Bob Rae, Chrystia Freeland, and Bill Graham.

In the 2012 electoral redistribution proposals at the federal level, the neighbourhood was proposed for division, with Wellesley Street serving as the new boundary between Toronto Centre to the south and a new district of Mount Pleasant to the north. Due to community opposition, in the final report the northern boundary of Toronto Centre was shifted north to Charles Street.

=== Provincial ===
As early as 1977, politicians and journalists were already identifying the riding of St. George, the electoral district which included the Church and Wellesley village at that time, as perhaps the only electoral district in North America outside San Francisco where the support of gay voters could almost singlehandedly determine the winner. That district's MPPs in the 1970s and 1980s, Margaret Campbell (1973–1981) and Susan Fish (1981–1987), were both among the province's most vocal supporters of LGBT rights initiatives in the Legislative Assembly of Ontario during their terms in office. Despite this, the parties remained reluctant to actually nominate an openly gay candidate, for fear of backlash against the parties in other parts of the province – in 1981, the Ontario Liberal Party rejected the candidacy of Peter Maloney and the Ontario New Democratic Party rejected the candidacy of John Argue, with Maloney claiming that party insiders had dismissed him as a "single-issue candidate".

When St. George was redistributed into St. George—St. David for the 1987 election, Ian Scott defeated Fish for the seat. Scott was not openly gay during his time in the legislature, although his sexuality was something of an open secret, and he came out after his retirement from politics. When Tim Murphy won the seat in a 1993 by-election after Scott's resignation from the legislature, one of his first significant legislative initiatives as an MPP was the presentation of a private member's bill which would have expanded the rights of same-sex couples, although it was later superseded by the Rae government's failed Equality Rights Statute Amendment Act.

For the 1999 election, St. George—St. David was redistributed into the current district of Toronto Centre. George Smitherman, the first openly gay MPP elected to the provincial legislature in Ontario, represented the district from 1999 to 2010. After his resignation from the legislature to run for Mayor of Toronto in the 2010 mayoral election, he was succeeded by the openly gay Glen Murray. Murray resigned his seat effective 1 September 2017 to accept a position with the Pembina Institute, and the seat remained vacant until the 2018 provincial election. Suze Morrison was elected to the Legislative Assembly of Ontario to represent Toronto Centre in the 2018 provincial election. In 2021 Morrison came out as bisexual.

Kristyn Wong-Tam, formerly the area's representative to Toronto City Council, was elected to the Legislative Assembly of Ontario in 2022.

=== Municipal ===
In 1991, Kyle Rae was elected to Toronto City Council to represent the ward that includes Church and Wellesley, becoming the city's first out gay councillor. He represented the area until 2010, when he retired and was succeeded by Kristyn Wong-Tam, the city's first out lesbian councillor.

Since the 2022 Toronto municipal election, the neighbourhood is represented by Chris Moise.

== Demographics ==
Historical population
Year	Pop.	±%
2006	17,160	—
2011	18,857	+9.9%
2016	22,530	+19.5%
2021	26,163	+16.1%

In 2006, the non-immigrant population accounted for 58% of the census tract population. The immigrant population was 35% and the non-permanent residents 7%. In 2011, the non-immigrant population still accounted for 58% but the non-permanent residents population rose from 7 to 10%, leaving the immigrant population at 32%.

== Transportation ==
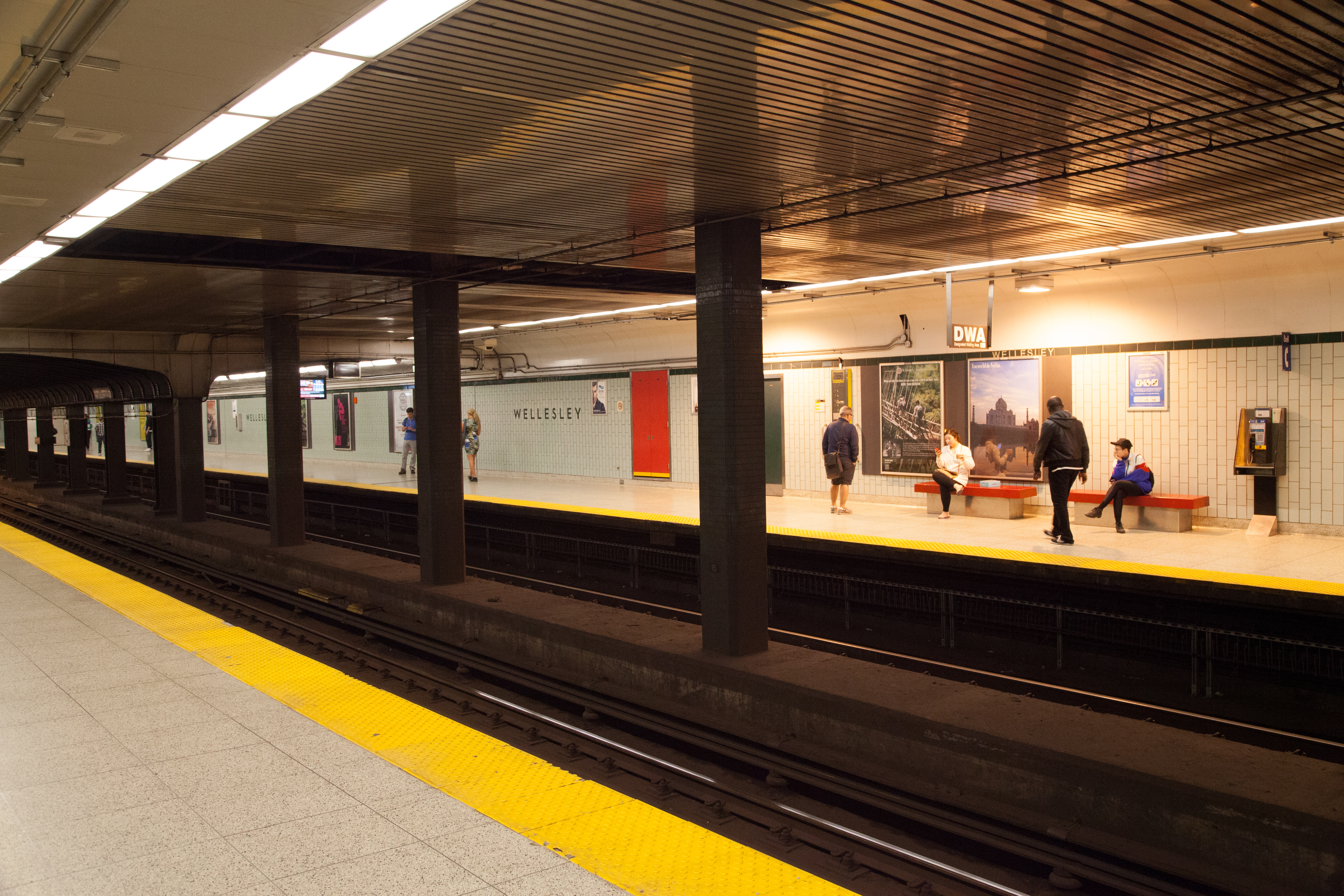
The Toronto subway can be accessed at Yonge and Wellesley from Wellesley station, a stop on Line 1 Yonge–University.

The Wellesley subway station on Line 1 Yonge–University provides the community with access to Toronto's extensive subway system. Other stations that are within walking distance to the community include:

Yonge–University–Spadina line:

- Bloor-Yonge
- College

Bloor–Danforth line:

- Bloor-Yonge
- Sherbourne
- Castle Frank

Bus and streetcar routes that provide transportation to the community include:

- 75 Sherbourne (Northbound to South Drive Northbound and Southbound to Queen's Quay)
- 94 Wellesley (no transfer required at Wellesley station)
- 97(B) Yonge (Northbound to Steeles Avenue and Southbound to Queen's Quay)
- 141 Jarvis (Express service northbound to Mount Pleasant Road/Davisville Avenue (Davisville Village) and southbound service to Dundas Street/Jarvis Street; Express routes require additional fare.)
- 506 Carlton

== In popular culture ==
The television series Queer as Folk, a Canadian-American coproduction, was filmed in the Church and Wellesley area. Although considerable outdoor filming took place and the neighbourhood was quite recognizable within the show, the series was set in Pittsburgh rather than Toronto.

The Toronto-based comedy troupe The Kids in the Hall performed a recurring sketch, "The Steps", on their television series in the late 1980s and early 1990s. Although the sketch was filmed on a studio set, it was inspired by a real cultural touchstone in the Church and Wellesley area, a series of steps along the length of a building on the southwest corner of Church and Wellesley where residents of and visitors to the neighbourhood regularly congregated to hang out.

In 2020, CBC Gem premiered the web series Queens, a comedic mystery set in the neighbourhood and starring several real life Toronto drag queens.

== Notable people ==
- Enza Anderson, transgender media personality and political candidate
- Michelle DuBarry, drag entertainer
- Mark Elliot, the first openly gay talk show host on CFRB
- Malcolm Ingram, director Small Town Gay Bar
- Kyle Rae, former Toronto city councillor
- Michelle Ross, drag entertainer

== See also ==
- List of gay villages
- List of neighbourhoods in Toronto
