= Alexander Wood (merchant) =

Merchant and magistrate in Upper Canada (1772-1844)

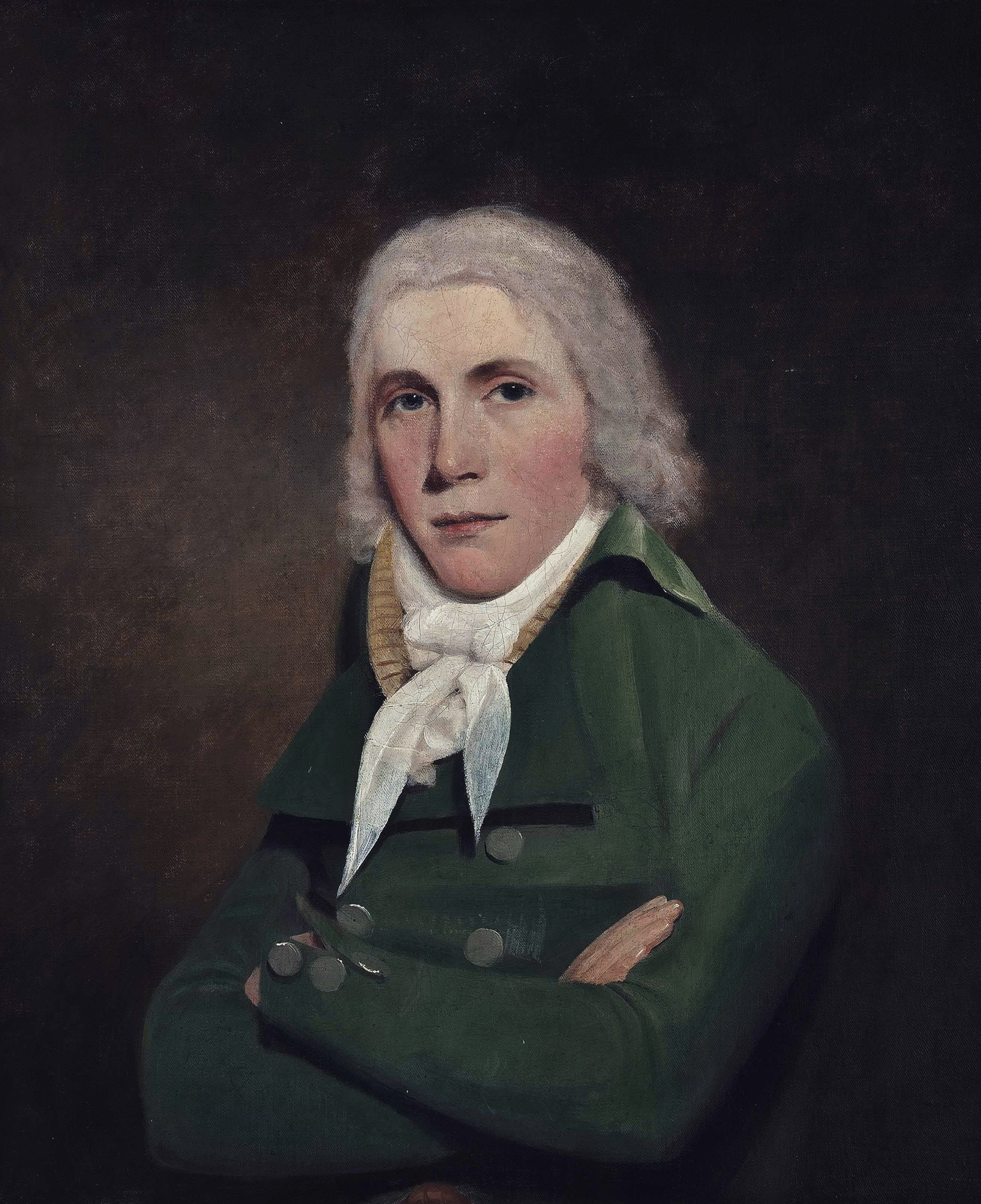
- Undated portrait of Wood by Henry Raeburn
- Born: January 1772; Fetteresso, Scotland
- Died: 11 September 1844 (aged 72); Woodcot, Scotland

Alexander Wood (January 1772 – 11 September 1844) was a Scottish merchant and magistrate in Upper Canada who was the centre of a sex scandal in 1810.

== Early life and career ==
Wood was born at Fetteresso near Stonehaven, Scotland, and he moved to Upper Canada in 1793, settling in the town of York (now Toronto) four years later. His original home was located on King Street, between Bay and York Streets, in the heart of what is now Toronto's Financial District. Going into business with William Allan, he established himself as one of the city's leading merchants, was gazetted lieutenant in the York militia in 1798, and was appointed a city magistrate in 1800. In 1801, Wood opened his own store providing quality goods imported from London and Glasgow. The first sidewalk of Toronto was laid on the northwest corner of his King and Frederick shop.

== Scandal of 1810 ==
In 1810, Wood found himself at the centre of a scandal when he investigated a rape case. The victim, referred to as Miss Bailey, came to Wood claiming that she did not know the identity of her attacker, however she had scratched her assailant's penis during the assault. In order to identify the assailant, Wood personally inspected the genitals of a number of suspects for injury. There is no evidence on the public record that Wood acted improperly during the investigation, nor indeed of Wood's actual sexual orientation; however, contradictory rumours began to emerge about his conduct, including allegations that Miss Bailey never existed at all and that Wood had fabricated the rape charge as an opportunity to fondle and seduce young men.

When confronted with the charges by his friend, Judge William Dummer Powell, Wood wrote back, "I have laid myself open to ridicule & malevolence, which I know not how to meet; that the thing will be made the subject of mirth and a handle to my enemies for a sneer I have every reason to expect." Wood became the subject of ridicule and was tagged with the nickname "Molly Wood", "Molly" then being a derisive slang expression for a homosexual man. John Robinson, at the time a young law clerk in Powell's office, called Wood the "Inspector General of private Accounts."

Judge Powell buried the potential sodomy charges on condition that Wood leave Upper Canada, and Wood left for Scotland in October 1810.

== Return to York ==
Wood returned to York by 1812, resuming his prior appointment as a magistrate. He fought in the War of 1812 and was on the boards of several organizations. His life in York continued without incident until 1823, when Rev. John Strachan, a longtime friend of Wood's, recommended him for a position on the 1812 War Claims Commission. Judge Powell was the appointing authority and refused Wood on moral grounds due to the 1810 scandal. Wood sued Powell for defamation and won, but Powell refused to pay and subsequently published a pamphlet attacking Wood even further.

Wood remained in York, continuing his service in civic duties for the next seventeen years. In 1827 he purchased 50 acres (0.2 km^{2}) of land at Yonge and Carlton Streets, which was referred to as "Molly Wood's Bush" throughout the 19th century.

== Death ==
Alexander Wood finally returned to Scotland in 1842 and he died there two years later at the age of 72 in Woodcot. The British Colonist paid tribute to Wood as one of Toronto's most distinguished founding citizens.

Wood had never married—and neither had any of his brothers and sisters, all of whom were themselves already deceased by the time of Wood's death—and he consequently had no legal heirs. Owing to differences between Scottish and Canadian estate law, it took seven years after his death for the Court of Session and the British House of Lords to decide that his estate would be divided up under Scottish, rather than Canadian, law. His estate thus passed to a first cousin once removed in 1851.

== Legacy ==
The area once known as Molly Wood's Bush is now part of Toronto's Church and Wellesley gay village, and contains an Alexander Street, a Wood Street and an Alexander Place.

In 1994, playwrights John Wimbs and Christopher Richards launched a play entitled Molly Wood, based on Wood's life. This production garnered Dora Awards for Best New Play and Best Production in 1995.

The Alexander Wood Letterbooks, which are in the collection of the Baldwin Room at the Toronto Public Library, are widely used as a resource for researching trade in early Upper Canada.

In 2005, Church Wellesley Village Business Improvement Association (CWVBIA) launched a beer named for Wood. Alexander Wood Lager was brewed by Lakes of Muskoka Cottage Brewery and was marketed exclusively to bars in the Church and Wellesley area.

=== Statue ===
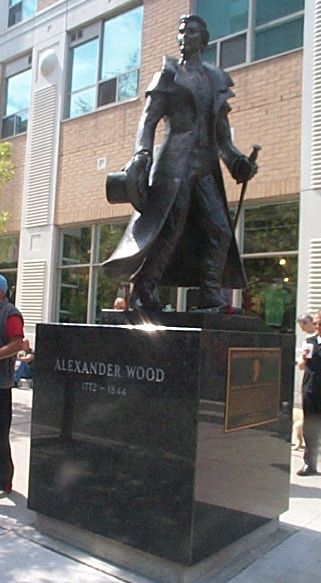
Statue of Alexander Wood formerly at the corner of Church and Alexander streets in Toronto

In 2005, the CWVBIA erected a statue of Wood in the neighbourhood, honouring him as a forefather of Toronto's modern gay community. The statue by sculptor Del Newbigging was unveiled on 28 May 2005. The $200,000 cost was shared by the business association and the City of Toronto. The statue incorporated a rose on the lapel of Wood's coat, in a secondary nod to Pierre Elliott Trudeau, the prime minister at the time a law was passed where a limited exception was added to the Criminal Code for the offenses of buggery or gross indecency—provided the acts took place in private and those involved were over 21. Homosexual acts remained defined in law as a crime.

On 8 June 2021, the Church-Wellesley Village BIA called for the removal of the statue because of the involvement of Alexander Wood in the Society for Converting and Civilizing the Indians and Propagating the Gospel Among Destitute Settlers in Upper Canada, which contributed to the organization of the Indian residential school system in Canada. The statue was taken down on 4 April 2022 by the business improvement association.
