= Enza Anderson =

Canadian transgender political activist

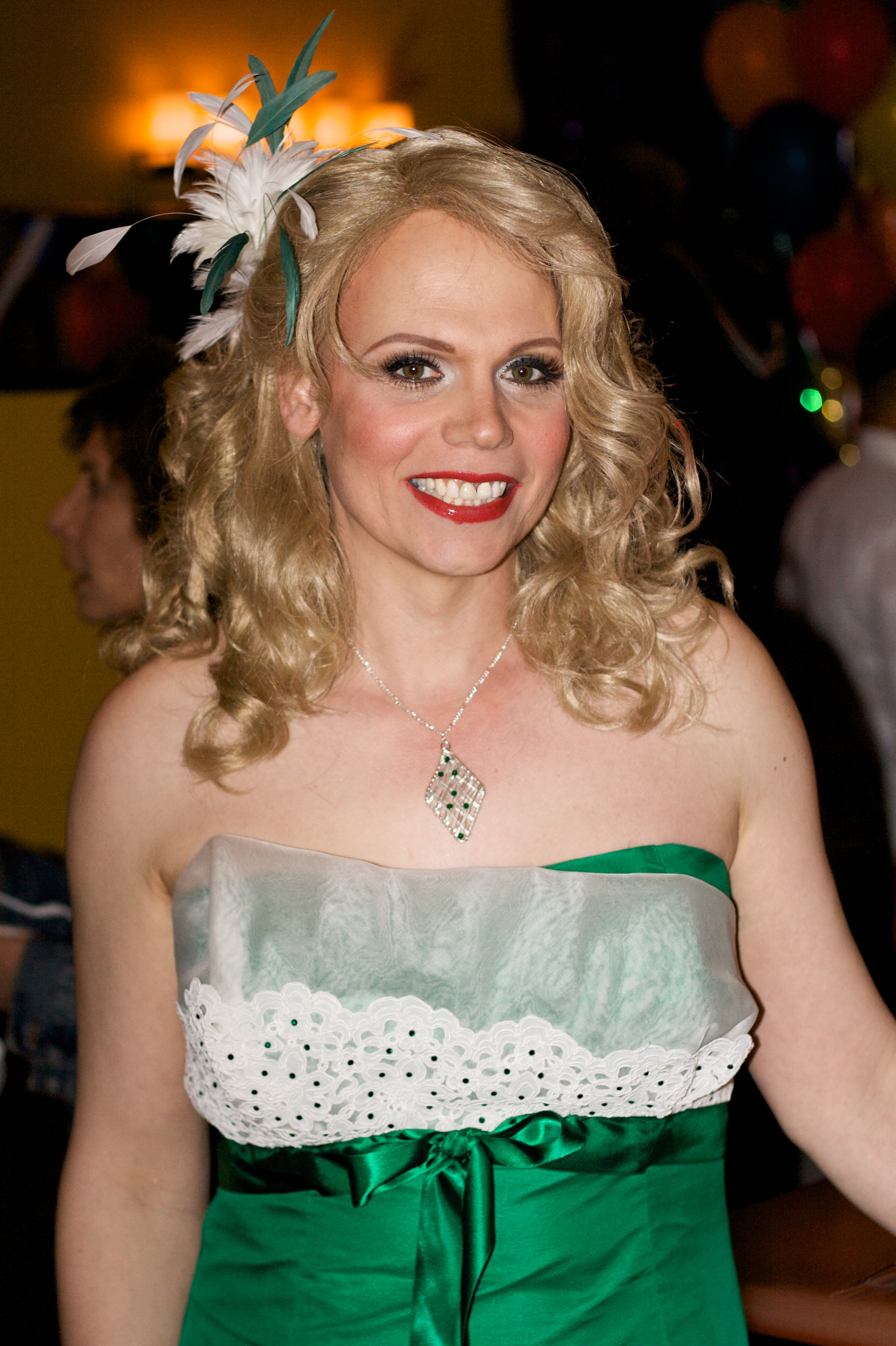
- Born: 1964 (age 61–62); Toronto, Ontario, Canada
- Occupations: Journalist, media personality, politician, activist

Enza Anderson (born 1964) is a Canadian journalist, media personality, Ontario politician, and transgender rights activist.

== Early life and education ==
Anderson was born in Toronto, Ontario. Assigned male at birth, she grew up in Toronto, living near Jane and Finch with an Italian-Catholic father.

She initially attended York University to study geography but left due to a combination of lack of interest in the subject and her mother becoming sick. After a one-year hiatus, she attended Seneca College where she studied civil engineering and technologies.

== Early career ==
After graduation she worked as the quality control supervisor of a concrete pipe-manufacturing plant, but was laid off after five years. She then worked part-time as a bartender at Woody's.

In 1995, she got a job at a hair salon on Yonge Street, which called for her to hand out flyers for the salon to pedestrians in drag. It was during that job that a photo of her kissing then-mayor Mel Lastman ended up on the front cover of the Toronto Sun, marking the start of her career in the public eye.

Anderson wrote a social column, "The Hot Ticket", for Canada's highest circulated free daily newspaper, Metro Toronto. She also divides her work schedule at the Bank of Montreal assisting clients as a financial services manager.

== Politics ==
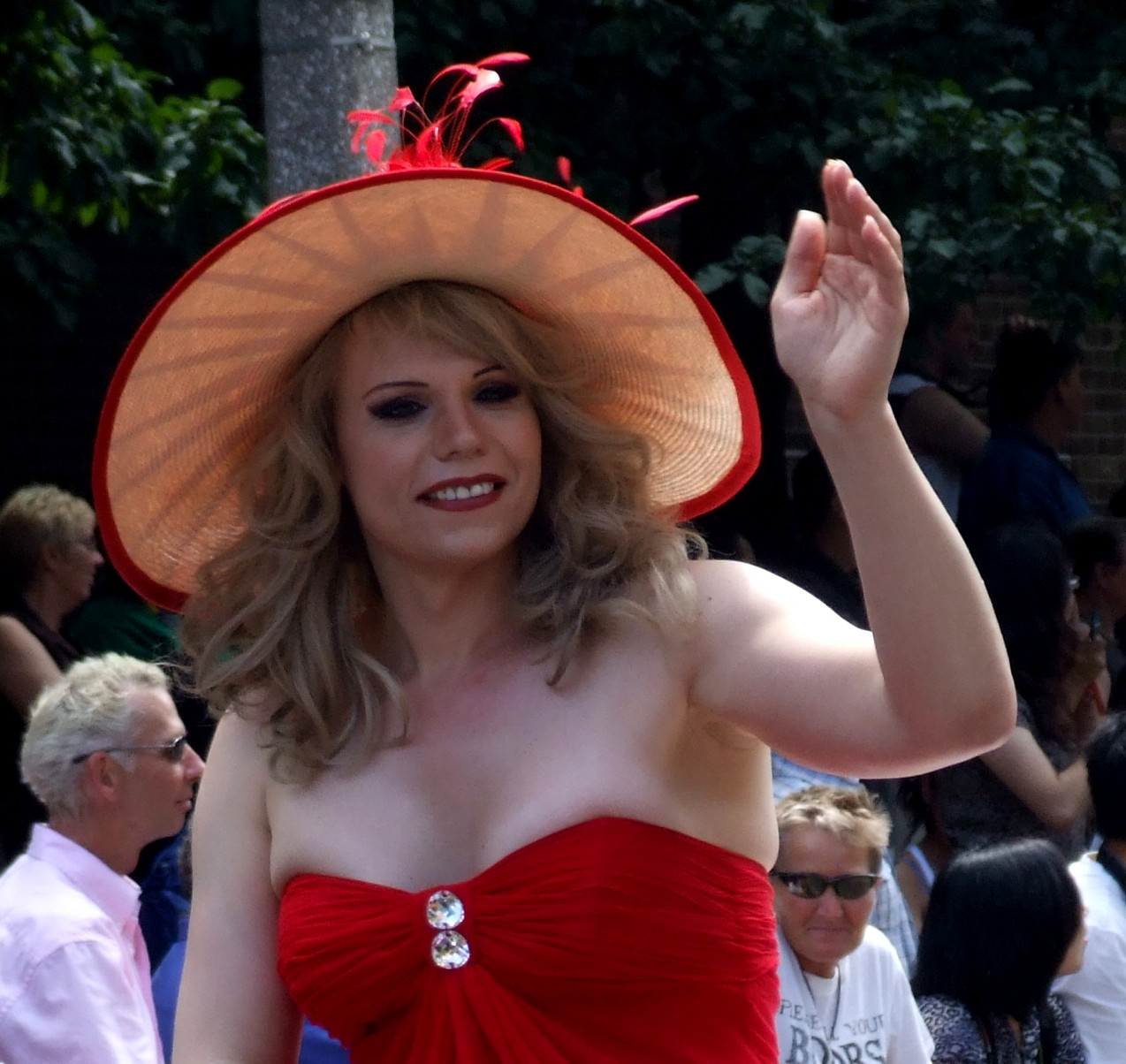
Enza Anderson

In 2000, Anderson ran for mayor of Toronto. Although the eventual winner of that campaign, Mel Lastman, won over 80% of the vote, Anderson garnered 13,585 votes, placing third behind Lastman and Tooker Gomberg. She was one of the few candidates besides Lastman, Gomberg and Ben Kerr to gain widespread name recognition in the race, even though her campaign largely consisted of standing on downtown street corners with a handmade placard bearing the slogan "A Super City Deserves a Super Model!".

In 2002, Anderson ran for the leadership of the Canadian Alliance. She was unable to raise the $25,000 required by the party to register as a candidate, and dropped out of the race before the convention which ultimately chose Stephen Harper.

In the 2003 municipal election in Toronto, Anderson ran for a city council seat against incumbent Kyle Rae and placed second, though she was not considered to be a serious threat against him.

She ran and lost in the same ward in the 2010 municipal election.

== Media ==
Anderson has a column in the Toronto newspaper Metro, covering local entertainment and party gossip since 2004, after she pitched the idea of her doing a column to the editor-in-chief, bringing a mocked-up version of one of her articles complete with Metro banner. She was also a fully clothed guest interviewer in the male version of Naked News.

She was the subject of a 2003 documentary by Carlos Valencia named A Man in a Dress, and was also interviewed speaking about her spirituality on Vision TV's Credo. In 2015, Enza was the feature of her second documentary ...When The Bullying Ends which was selected to screen at the 2016 Kolkata Shorts International Film Festival in India. Directed by queer filmmaker Raymond Helkio tells the story her work as an anti-bullying and queer rights activist.

Anderson was chosen as grand marshal of Toronto's 2008 Pride Parade.

== Community activism ==
Anderson served as a board member of the Church and Wellesley Neighbourhood Police Liaison Committee. Her two years as Pride Committee Co-chair of Fundraising helped raise record amounts needed to cover festival costs. She put in many fundraising hours for the AIDS Committee of Toronto and its signature fundraising event Fashion Cares. Anderson helped bring awareness of support groups like the People With AIDS Foundation and the Lesbian, Gay, Bisexual, Transgendered Youth Support Line. She also served on the Federation of Metro Tenants' Associations. She also serves on the LGBT Consultative Committee-Toronto Police Service.
