= Statue of Alexander Wood =

Former statue in Toronto, Ontario

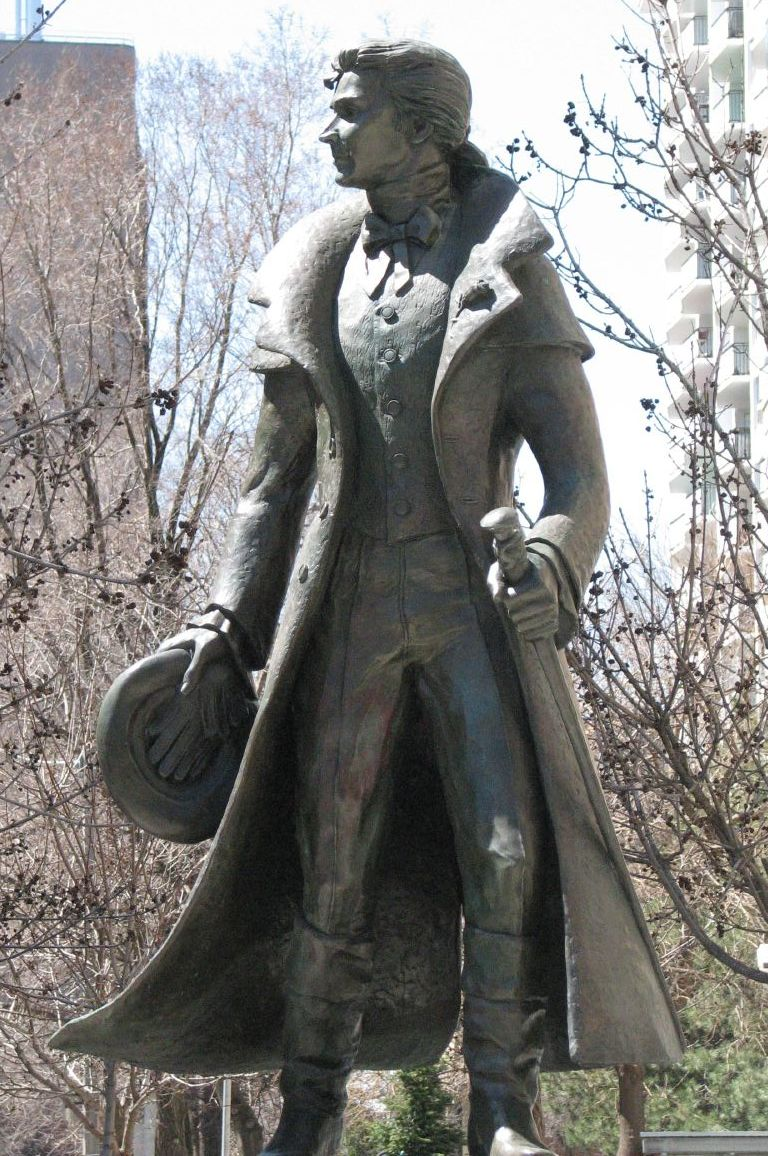
- The statue in 2007
- Artist: Del Newbigging
- Completion date: May 28, 2005; 21 years ago
- Medium: Bronze sculpture
- Subject: Alexander Wood
- Dimensions: 244 cm (96 in)
- Condition: Destroyed on April 4, 2022; 4 years ago
- Location: Toronto, Ontario, Canada; 43°39′49.4″N 79°22′49.3″W

A statue of Alexander Wood was erected in Toronto, Ontario, Canada, by the Church Wellesley Village Business Improvement Area (CWVBIA) and the municipal government of Toronto on May 28, 2005. Designed and constructed by artist Del Newbigging, the 244-centimetre-tall (8 ft) bronze sculpture was installed at the corner of Church and Alexander Streets in Church and Wellesley, the gay village of Toronto. It was the first LGBT monument in Canada. The statue was controversially removed and destroyed by the CWVBIA on April 4, 2022, amid renewed focus on Wood's ties to a group that raised funds for a mission school that later became the Shingwauk Indian Residential School.

== Background ==
Alexander Wood (January 1772 – September 11, 1844) was a Scottish merchant and magistrate in Upper Canada. In 1810, in the course of his investigation into a rape case in which the victim stated she did not know her assailant's identity but had managed to scratch his penis, Wood personally inspected the genitals of multiple male suspects. The circumstances of the investigation led to accusations of impropriety and rumours of homosexual activity, though formal charges were not pursued against Wood on the condition that he return to Scotland. Wood departed Upper Canada in 1810, but returned to Toronto in 1812 and purchased fifty acres of land at Carlton and Church streets; the area became known as Molly Wood's Bush (Note: "Molly" is a pejorative for an effeminate or gay man.) and is presently the site of Church and Wellesley, Toronto's gay village. Owing to these associations, Wood is frequently commemorated and memorialized as an early figure in Canadian LGBT history.

== Description ==
The 244-centimetre (8 ft) statue, constructed from solid bronze, was designed and constructed by artist Del Newbigging over the course of nearly two years. Newbigging used reproductions of Georgian era silhouette portraits of Wood as reference for the statue's likeness, but took creative liberties to make Wood "handsome, because the people in this community will appreciate that" and added what he described as "a gay flair which I am convinced he would have had". The artist modelled Wood's clothing on fashions typical of a dandy, citing the bow tie, ponytail, and flower lapel visible in these portraits. A red rose was included in the statue's lapel as a tribute to Pierre Trudeau, whose government decriminalized homosexuality in Canada in 1969.

The statue stood on a 1.5-metre (5 ft), 10-tonne (9.8-long-ton; 11-short-ton) granite base to which plaques that listed information about Wood's life and history were affixed. One plaque detailed Wood's rape investigation, which depicted a motif in which the exposed buttocks of a suspect was visible. Newbigging modelled the buttocks on those of his husband John Carolan; Daily Xtra noted in 2012 that touching the bronze buttocks had "become somewhat of a lucky charm for passersby," and that wear from frequent rubbing of the buttocks by pedestrians had left their formerly green patina "smooth and bright".

== History ==
=== Establishment ===
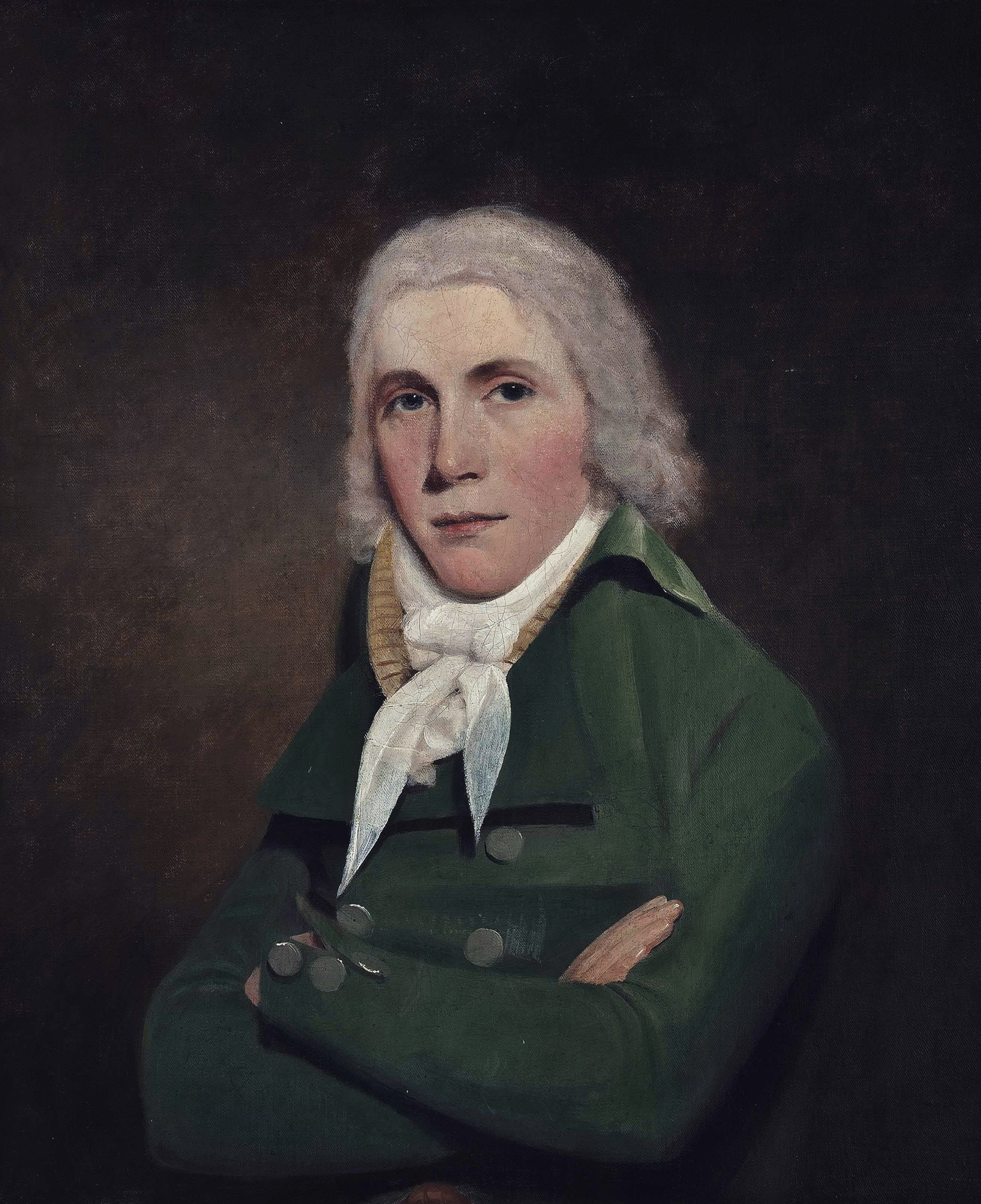
Undated portrait of Wood by Henry Raeburn

A statue of Wood was commissioned in the early 2000s by the Church Wellesley Village Business Improvement Area (CWVBIA), at a total cost of CA$200,000 split evenly between the CWVBIA and the municipal government of Toronto. It was the first major installation initiative of the CWVBIA, with the organization assuming responsibility for the cost of installing, constructing, and maintaining the statue. The statue took roughly six months to receive approvals from the city, which Newbigging regarded as an unusually short amount of time.

The statue was formally unveiled at the corner of Church and Alexander Streets in Toronto on May 28, 2005, in a ceremony attended by over 300 people. The unveiling was celebrated with a parade of bagpipers, a performing colour guard, and representatives from the LGBT groups Supporting Our Youth and the Righteously Outrageous Twirling Corps. Upon its establishment, the statue became the first LGBT monument in Canada. (Note: Sources reported that the statue was also "the first gay-individual-focused monument of its kind in the world", though the statue was predated by the Alan Turing Memorial in Manchester, unveiled in 2001.)

=== Removal and destruction ===
On June 8, 2021, the CWVBIA submitted a letter to Toronto mayor John Tory demanding that the statue of Wood be removed. The letter criticized Wood's status as a founding member and treasurer of The Society for Converting and Civilizing the Indians and Propagating the Gospel Among Destitute Settlers in Upper Canada, a group that raised funds for mission schools. Among these schools was the St. John's Missionary to the Ojibway, which was later absorbed into Canada's residential school system and became the Shingwauk Indian Residential School. The CWVBIA's letter came amid renewed public focus on Canada's residential school system, prompted by the discovery of unmarked graves at the sites of several former residential schools in 2021. In their letter, the CWVBIA wrote that allowing the statue to remain would send a "clear message to the two-spirit community that racism is being allowed to continue, and in fact being iconized in Toronto".

The statue was removed and destroyed on April 4, 2022, which sparked mixed, "complicated" reactions from the community and from the media. The statue itself was partially broken up and moved into a dumpster. The granite podium where the statue stood also was removed and the area it once occupied was filled with concrete. The removal was undertaken without advance notice, or consultation with the city or community groups. While the circumstances surrounding the authorization of the destruction were initially unclear, the CWVBIA confirmed in a statement after the fact that the removal was undertaken at their direction, and that the group had hired a contractor to remove the statue in March 2022. According to Toronto City Councillor Kristyn Wong-Tam, whose ward includes Church and Wellesley, the statue was owned by the CWVBIA and thus did not require city authorization to be destroyed.

== Reception ==
=== Initial response ===
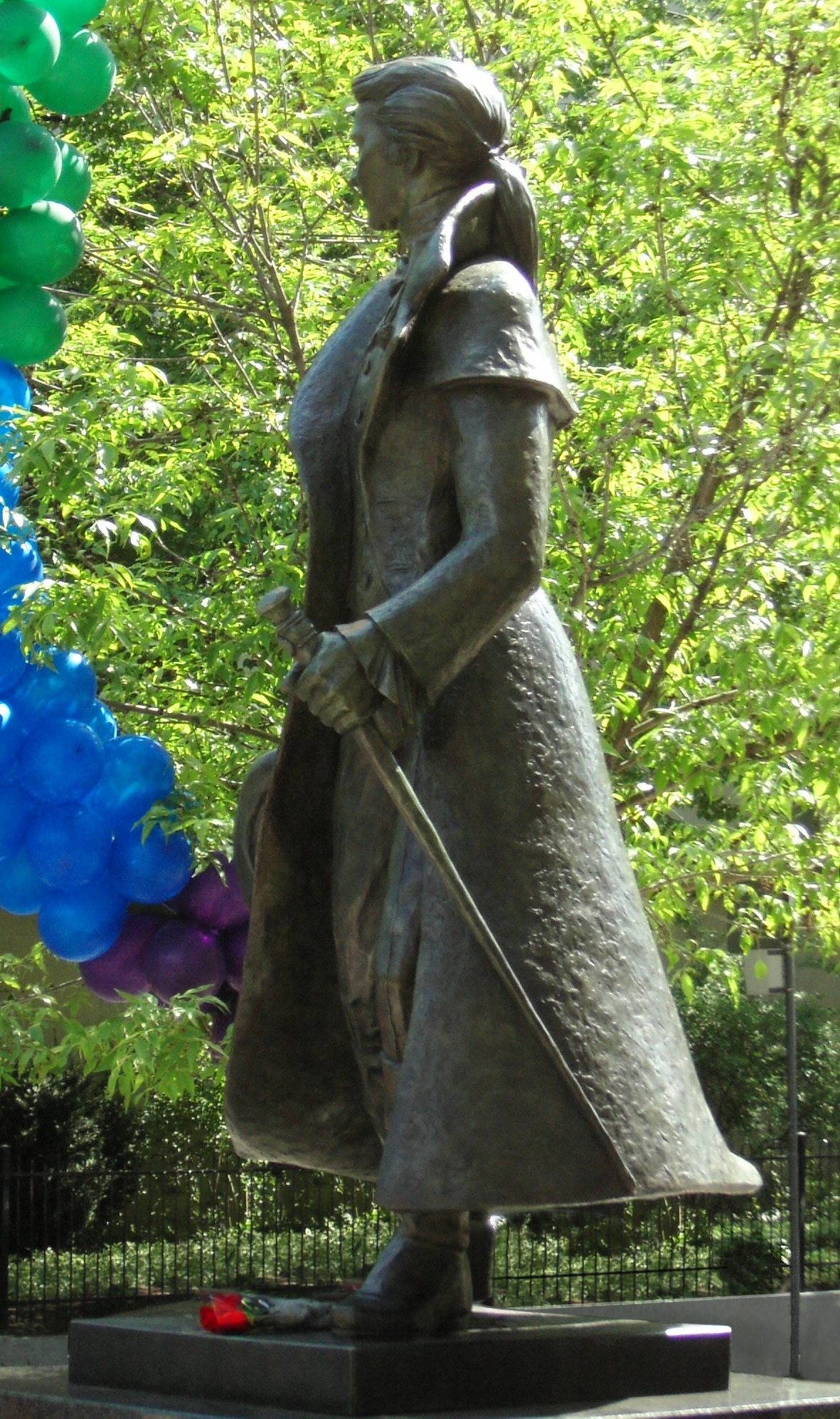
Alternate angle of the statue, photographed at its unveiling on May 28, 2005

In 2012, Xtra Magazine praised the statue as a "rarity of urban sculpture: classic, accessible and aesthetically pleasing. Its lifelike, intricate detail stands apart from the more freeform modern pieces that dot our city’s landscape, leaving no question that it was sculpted at the height of [Newbigging's] artistic powers." Kristyn Wong-Tam, who was a member of the CWVBIA when the statue was originally commissioned, praised Newbigging's "meticulous planning and confident execution of Canada's only monument to a gay pioneer" that "will forever stand proudly over the Church and Wellesley Village".

=== Reactions to removal and destruction ===
Reactions were mixed. Upon the publication of the CWVBIA's letter in 2021, Kristyn Wong-Tam voiced support for the statue's removal, though stated she was "a little bit shocked" by photographs that circulated after the removal of the statue inside a dumpster, and by the apparent lack of consultation with Newbigging's family. Steven Maynard, a historian at Queen's University, supported the removal, stating that "we pretty much always knew the Alexander Wood story, hence the reason why some of us, myself included, objected to [the statue's creation] in the first place."

The extent of Wood's connection to and support of Canada's residential school system has been contested. In the National Post, writer Adam Zivo noted that Wood was an executive in a vast number of Toronto societies, that St. John's Missionary to the Ojibway was an Indigenous led-project organized by Shingwauk, and that by the time the school was integrated into the residential system, Wood had already been deceased for 37 years. The Province characterized claims that Wood was an advocate for residential schools as "largely inaccurate". Krista McCracken, historian and director of the Residential Schools Centre at Algoma University, indicated "mixed feelings" about the CWVBIA's letter, as historical consensus is divided on the status of mission schools as a direct predecessor to residential schools. McCracken stated that Indigenous community members "need to be the ones who are making decisions around what stays and what doesn’t stay. That being said, listening to community can take time and I think it’s really important to give the time and space needed to have robust conversations around this history."

== See also ==
- Monuments and memorials in Canada removed in 2020–2022
