= Del Newbigging =

Canadian sculptor

- Born: Robert Delford Newbigging; September 29, 1934; Listowel, Ontario
- Died: August 23, 2012 (aged 77)
- Occupations: Artist, author, arts teacher
- Notable work: Alexander Wood Statue
- Board member of: Medallic Art Society of Canada
- Spouse: John Carolan

Robert Delford Newbigging (1934–2012) was a Canadian artist, visual arts teacher, and children's author, whose bronze-fashioned works have been showcased in art galleries across Europe and North America.

Newbigging is best known for facilitating the project concept, development, and creation of Toronto's Alexander Wood statue, which was later controversially destroyed.

== Authorship ==
Popularly known by the nickname Del Newbigging, the Listowel, Ontario native was author and illustrator of Robert Rat Has A Problem, a children's book teaching the significance of agreeing to disagree and the importance of nutrition.

== Medallist ==
On July 16, 2000, Newbigging co-founded the Medallic Art Society of Canada (MASC), an organization "dedicated to the creation, promotion, appreciation and education of the fine art of the medal."

== Alexander Wood ==
=== Statue conception, development, and creation ===
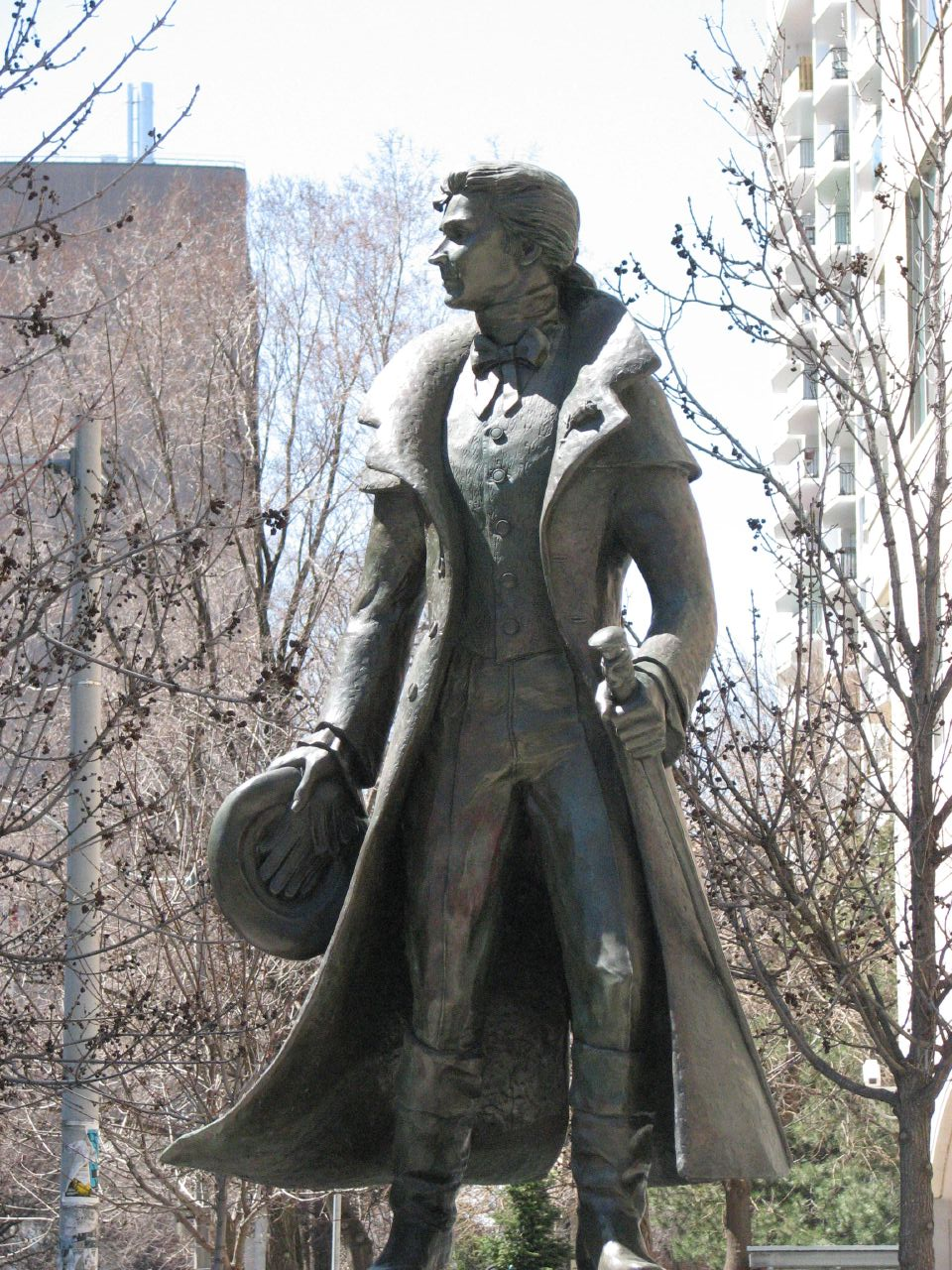
The statue photographed in 2007

Of his body of works, Newbigging's most notable contribution is his monumental statue of the late Alexander Wood, a merchant and magistrate in the city of York (now Toronto).

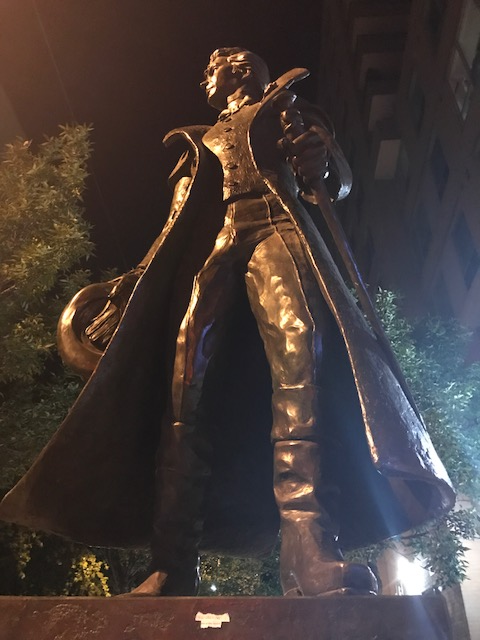
The statue photographed in 2017

The bronze sculpture of Alexander Wood was posted at the Church Street and Alexander Street intersection. It was officially unveiled on Saturday May 28, 2005.

"It's a symbol for any minority community that has struggled and fought to be accepted for their place and home in our city," said Dennis O'Connor, the former Church-Wellesley BIA chair, at the unveiling ceremony.

Newbigging's statue of Wood came after a two year process of development. The two-and-a-half-metre-tall bronze figure was formed almost entirely from that which Newbigging visualized Wood's physical appearance to be, with his prime reference said to have been a mere a silhouette of Wood. "Del Newbigging's legacy in Toronto's gay community is literally set not in stone, but rather in a cast of bronze," Toronto City Councillor Kristyn Wong-Tam told the press. "His meticulous planning and confident execution of Canada's only monument to a gay pioneer will forever stand proudly over the Church and Wellesley Village. We have Del to thank for this superb contribution to the community."

=== Removal and destruction ===
On June 8, 2021, the CWVBIA submitted a letter to Toronto mayor John Tory demanding that the statue of Wood be removed. The letter criticized Wood's status as a founding member and treasurer of The Society for Converting and Civilizing the Indians and Propagating the Gospel Among Destitute Settlers in Upper Canada, a group that raised funds for mission schools. Among these schools was the St. John's Missionary to the Ojibway, which was later absorbed into Canada's residential school system and became the Shingwauk Indian Residential School. The CWVBIA's letter came amid renewed public focus on Canada's residential school system, prompted by the discovery of unmarked graves at the sites of several former residential schools in 2021. In their letter, the CWVBIA wrote that allowing the statue to remain would send a "clear message to the two-spirit community that racism is being allowed to continue, and in fact being iconized in Toronto".

The statue was removed and destroyed on April 4, 2022, which sparked mixed, "complicated" reactions from the community and from the media. The statue itself was broken up and moved into a dumpster, while the statue's granite podium stood was removed and the area it once occupied was filled with concrete. The removal was undertaken without advance notice, or consultation with the city or community groups. While the circumstances surrounding the authorization of the destruction were initially unclear, the CWVBIA confirmed in a statement after the fact that the removal was undertaken at their direction, and that the group had hired a contractor to remove the statue in March 2022. According to Toronto City Councillor Kristyn Wong-Tam, whose ward includes Church and Wellesley, the statue was owned by the CWVBIA and thus did not require city authorization to be destroyed.
