= NFilm HD =

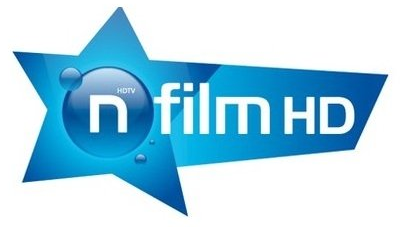
nFilm HD Logo

nFilm HD was a Polish premium movie channel broadcasting in standard HDTV, available exclusively on the DTH platform n. Tomasz Raczek is the director of the station.

The station was launched on 2 September 2009 together with the sister channel nFilm HD 2 with movie channels, VOD service nFilm VOD, and Internet radio station nFilm HD Radio with film music.

The station airs films and television series from Paramount Pictures, DreamWorks, MGM, TVN, and independent labels.
