= Woody's (Toronto) =

Gay bar in Toronto, Canada

Woody’s
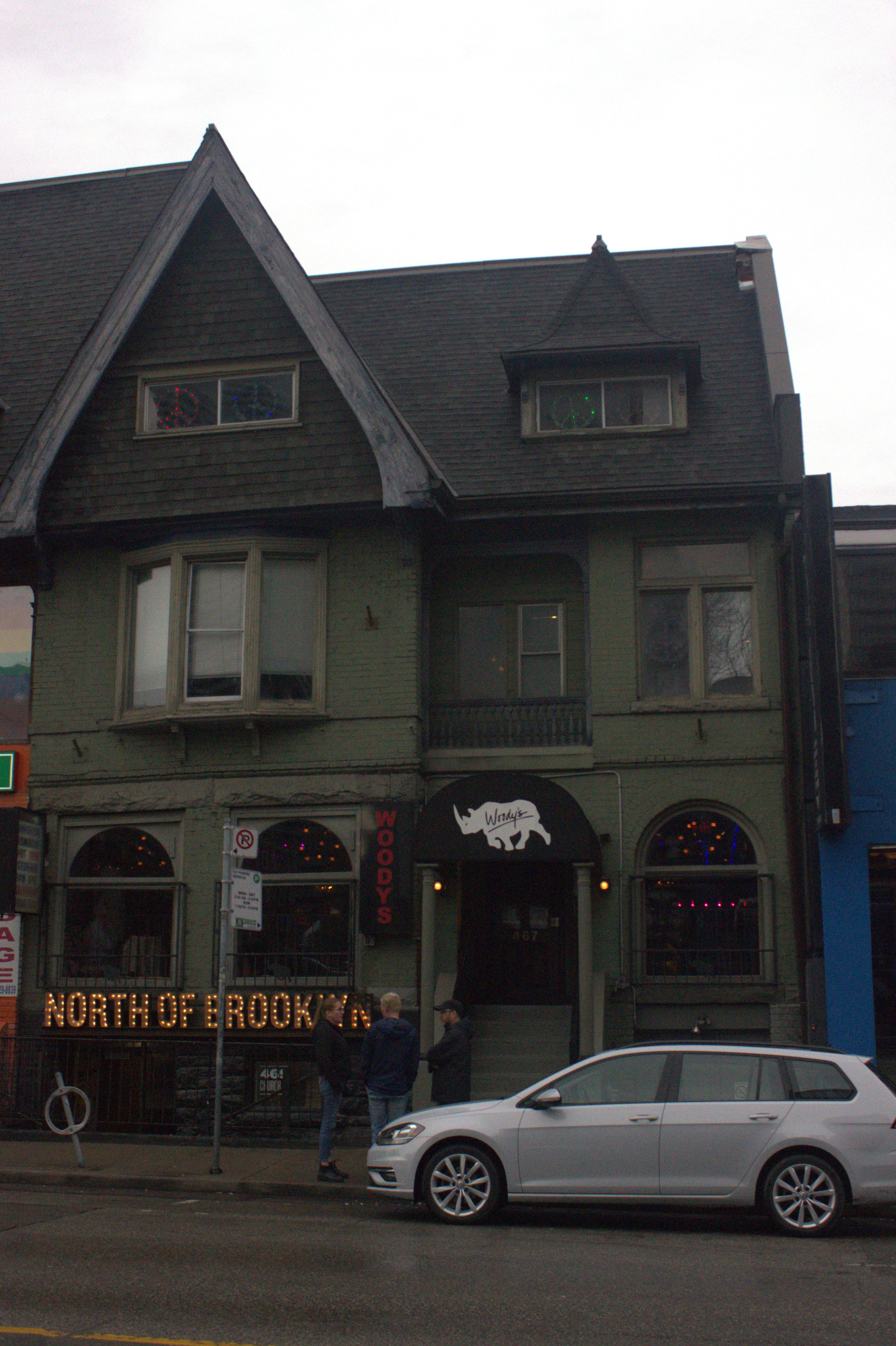
- Interactive map of Woody’s
- Address: 467 Church Street; Toronto, Ontario; M4Y 2C5
- Coordinates: 43.664438°N 79.380248°W

Woody's on Church is a gay bar located at 467 Church Street at the gay village in Toronto, Ontario, Canada.

== Summary ==
The bar was established in June 1989, and has since become a landmark within the Church and Wellesley village and a popular destination for LGBT tourists visiting the city.

Woody's operates with an adjacent bar known as Sailor. Woody's and Sailor appear to be separate establishments from the outside, but are connected inside. Woody's and Sailor are located at 465–467 Church St. Toronto, ON. Woody's hosts several "best" competitions, including "best chest" and "best ass", on various nights. These competitions are judged on popularity, with the contestant receiving the most applause crowned the winner. The top positions receive cash prizes and passes to local gay establishments, including dance clubs and bathhouses.

The bar is also one of Toronto's primary venues for drag queen shows.

== Depictions in pop culture ==
The North American version of the television show Queer as Folk featured the bar as its main queer hangout. Filmed in Toronto, the series was set in Pittsburgh, Pennsylvania, and the show would often film on the street outside the bar. Indoor scenes were shot on location in the first season, but a soundstage was later built. In a fourth-season episode of the series in which several of the characters travelled to Toronto, Woody's appeared both as Pittsburgh's "Woody's" and a fictional Toronto bar called "Moosie's". Woody's was also the highlight of a skit on Late Night with Conan O'Brien, and portions of the 2020 film Jump, Darling take place in a thinly veiled parody of Woody's called "Peckers".

== See also ==
- List of LGBTQ bars
