= Trish Stratus =

Canadian professional wrestler (born 1975)

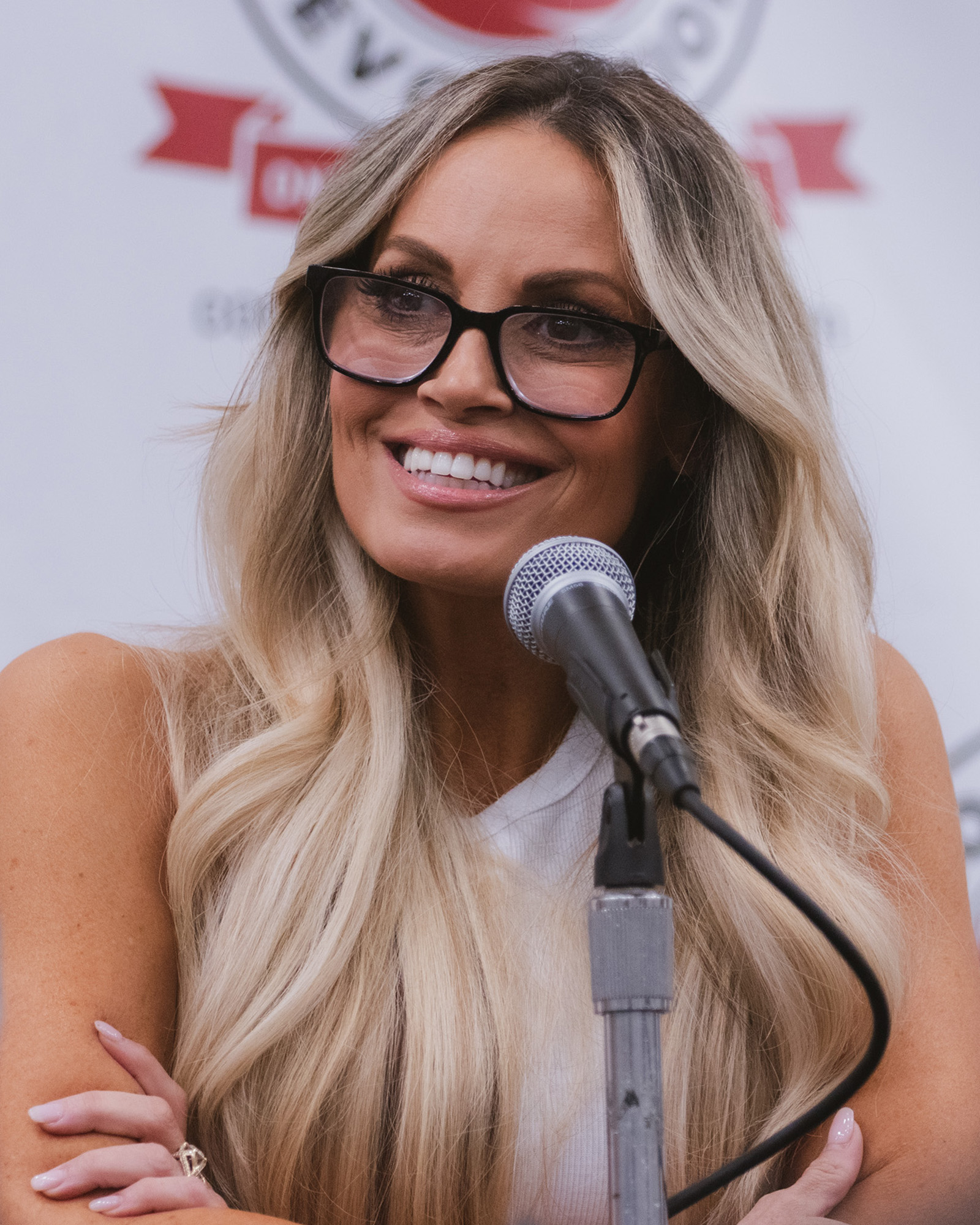
- Stratus in 2024

Personal information
- Born: Patricia Anne Stratigeas; December 18, 1975 (age 50) Greater Toronto Area, Ontario, Canada
- Spouse: Ron Fisico (m. 2006)
- Children: 2
- Website: trishstratus.com

Professional wrestling career
- Ring name: Trish Stratus
- Billed height: 5 ft 5 in (165 cm)
- Billed weight: 125 lb (57 kg)
- Billed from: Toronto, Ontario, Canada
- Trained by: Ron Hutchison; Fit Finlay
- Debut: March 19, 2000

Signature
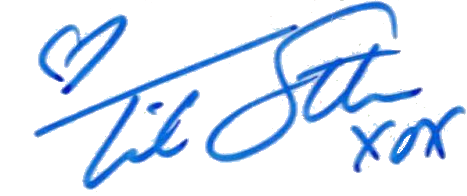

Patricia Anne Stratigeas (/ˈstrætɪdʒiəs/; born December 18, 1975), better known by the ring name Trish Stratus, is a Canadian professional wrestler, yoga instructor, actress and former fitness model. She is signed to WWE. Stratus's 448-day reign as WWF/WWE Women's Champion stands as the longest reign of any women's world champion in the 21st century.

Initially studying at York University to become a doctor, Stratus began her career as a fitness model. She began working for the World Wrestling Federation (WWF; later renamed to World Wrestling Entertainment (WWE)) in 2000. Early in her career, she was mostly involved in sexually themed storylines, such as managing the team T & A and a kayfabe affair with WWE owner Vince McMahon. As Stratus's popularity increased due to receiving more in-ring experience, she was made a one-time WWE Hardcore Champion, three-time "WWE Babe of the Year", and was proclaimed "Diva of the Decade". After nearly seven years in WWE, Stratus retired from professional wrestling on a full-time basis at WWE Unforgiven on September 17, 2006, after winning her record seventh WWE Women's Championship. She became an inductee of the 2013 WWE Hall of Fame.

Following her initial retirement from full-time performing, she has since made part-time WWE appearances. On Raw, she made sporadic tag-team match appearances between 2008 and 2011, including a mixed six-person tag team match at WrestleMania XXVII. In 2018, she returned to WWE to participate in the promotion's first Women's Royal Rumble and later competed at the all-female Evolution event in October of that year. She then wrestled Charlotte Flair in her first singles match on pay-per-view since her initial full-time retirement at SummerSlam 2019. In 2023, Stratus appeared in a six-woman tag team match at WrestleMania 39, after which she returned as a full-time member of the roster up until September of that year. She then took a hiatus and returned in February 2025 at the Royal Rumble.

Aside from professional wrestling, Stratus has appeared on a number of magazine covers and has been involved in charity work. She appeared as a judge on WWE Tough Enough in 2011, where she also had her first role in film as the main character in Bail Enforcers. She has also hosted several award and television shows and formerly owned a yoga studio. From 2022 to 2024, Stratus was featured as a judge on Canada's Got Talent.

== Early life ==
Stratus was born in Toronto, Ontario, Canada, and attended Bayview Secondary School in Richmond Hill, Ontario. Stratigeas is of Greek and Polish descent and is the eldest daughter of John and Alice Stratigeas. Her younger sisters are named Christie and Melissa. She enrolled at York University, where she studied biology and kinesiology and played soccer and field hockey. Due to a faculty strike in 1997, she was forced to change her plans. She was working as a receptionist at a local gym when she was approached by the publisher of MuscleMag International to do a test shoot for the magazine. She later appeared on the cover of the May 1998 issue and was signed to a two-year contract. For the next six months, she worked on her body and appeared on numerous magazine covers. During this time, she joined Big Daddy Donnie and Jeff Marek as the third host of Live Audio Wrestling on Toronto Sports Radio, The FAN 590.

Stratus had been a fan of wrestling since childhood and was especially fond of wrestlers Hulk Hogan and Randy Savage, among others. Her modelling work caught the attention of the World Wrestling Federation (WWF). In November 1999, she was signed to a multi-year contract with the company, who sent her to Sully's Gym where she was trained by Ron Hutchison.

== Professional wrestling career ==
=== World Wrestling Entertainment/WWE (2000–present) ===
==== T & A (2000–2001) ====
Stratus made her debut as a heel on the March 19, 2000, episode of Sunday Night Heat under the ring name Trish Stratus. She appeared on stage to scout Test and Prince Albert. The next night on Raw Is War, Test and Albert joined forces as the tag team T & A and Stratus began her first role in the company as their valet. It was during her stint managing T & A that Stratus took her first major bump in the ring, by being driven through a table by the Dudley Boyz at Backlash, after she had been taunting Bubba Ray Dudley for several weeks. In June, she was on the receiving end of a stinkface from Rikishi on Raw.

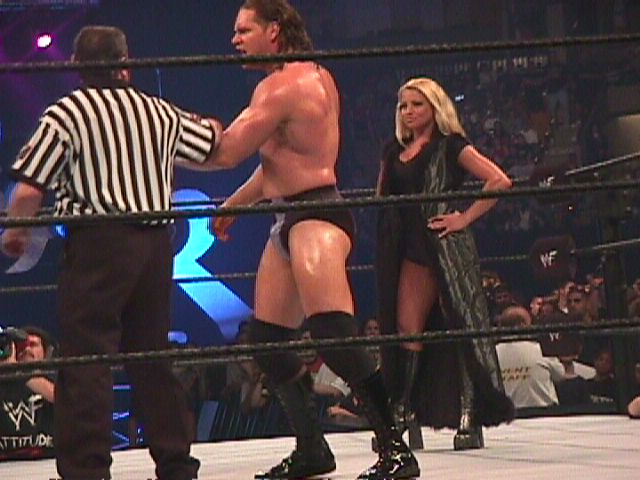
Stratus as Val Venis' manager during the 2000 King of the Ring event

She also began managing then-heel, Val Venis to win the WWE Intercontinental Championship, but their partnership ended at SummerSlam after Venis lost the title. Stratus made her in-ring debut on the June 22 episode of SmackDown!, winning a tag team match with T & A against the Hardy Boyz and Lita. A storyline feud between Stratus and Lita developed after the match with Stratus attacking Lita on episodes of Raw and SmackDown!. This led to an Indian Strap match between the two women on the July 24 episode of Raw, which Stratus won with help from Stephanie McMahon. She finished the year competing unsuccessfully for the WWF Women's Championship numerous times, and separating from Test and Albert when the team disbanded.

In early 2001, Stratus became involved in an angle with WWF Chairman Vince McMahon, during a time when Vince's wife Linda was kayfabe institutionalized following a demand Vince had made for a divorce during an episode of SmackDown!. Vince and Stratus' relationship increasingly angered the boss' daughter, then-heel, Stephanie McMahon. On the February 19 episode of Raw, Stephanie and Trish were scheduled for a match, but it quickly got cancelled due to Stephanie getting stunned by Steve Austin. At No Way Out, Stratus and Stephanie squared off, with Stephanie scoring the victory after a run-in by William Regal. In the midst of a tag team match that pitted Vince and Stratus against Regal and Stephanie the next night on Raw, Stratus was the victim of a set-up by Vince, Stephanie and Regal. Regal executed his finisher, the Regal Cutter, on Stratus and Stephanie then dumped slop over Stratus' body. Vince stood over Stratus and he told her she was a "toy" with which he had "grown tired of playing with". The angle continued the next week on Raw in controversial fashion, with Vince humiliating Stratus, forcing her to strip down to her black bra and panties in the ring and bark like a dog while crying. The storyline came to an end at WrestleMania X-Seven, when Stratus slapped Vince during his match against his son Shane, turning face in the process.

==== Women's Champion (2001–2003) ====
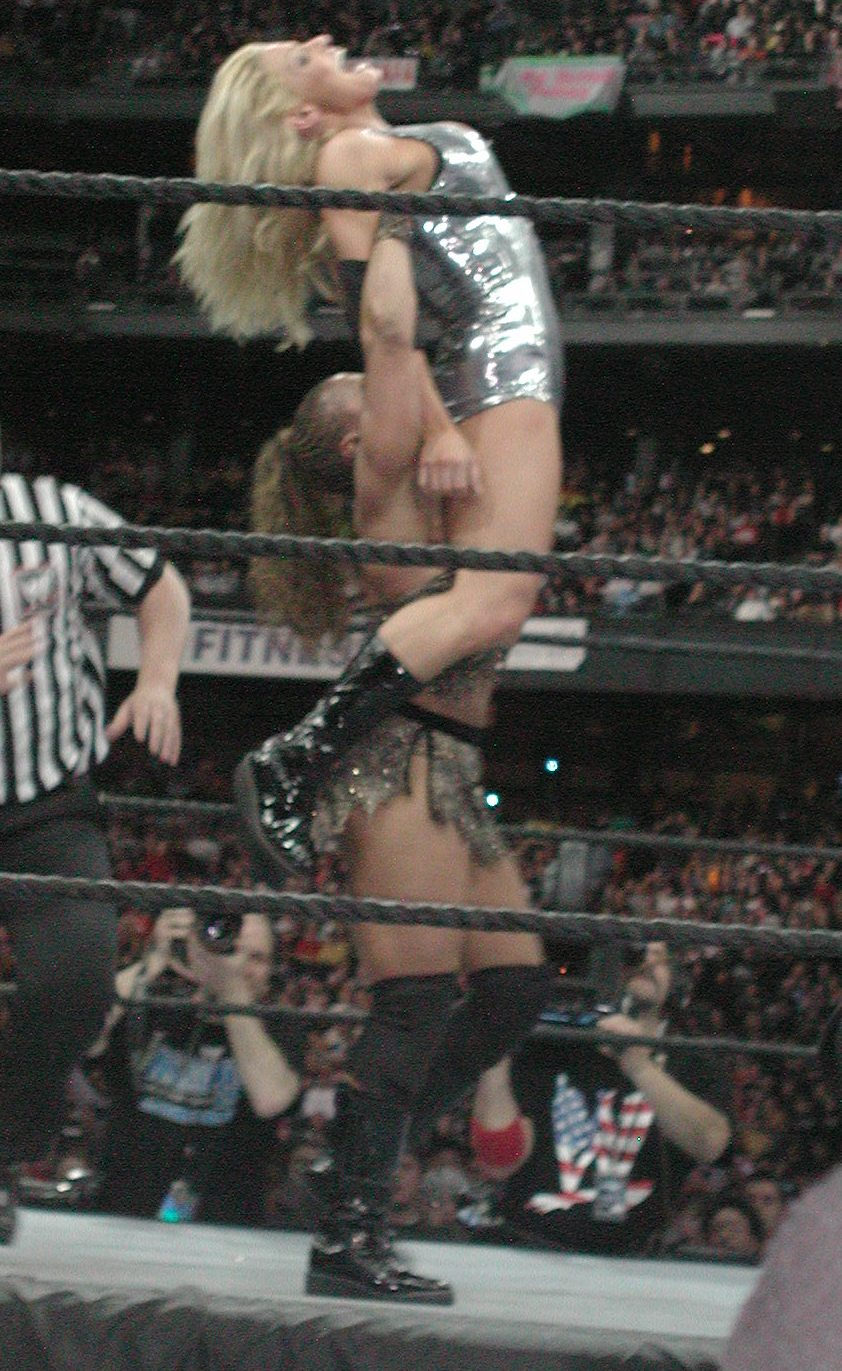
Stratus with her opponent Jazz at Wrestlemania XIX in 2003

Following her first face turn, Stratus began wrestling part-time. She teamed up with Lita against then-heels, Stacy Keibler and Torrie Wilson at Invasion. After suffering an ankle injury in the summer, however, she was sidelined for the following three months. This interrupted not only her recent venture into wrestling, but also an on-screen romance with Jeff Hardy and budding storyline with Team Xtreme. As she rehabilitated, she kept herself visible by co-hosting Excess on TNN. After returning in autumn, Stratus appeared at Survivor Series where she won the WWF Women's Championship for the first time in a six-pack challenge. Stratus was next involved in a feud with Jazz over the Women's Championship, where on the January 17, 2002, episode of SmackDown! Jazz attacked Stratus backstage and broke her hand. Stratus overcame the injury and retained the championship at the Royal Rumble. On the January 22 episode of SmackDown!, Stratus defeated Jazz via disqualification after Jazz relentlessly attacked Stratus's injured hand and left her laid out in the ring. Stratus eventually dropped the championship to Jazz in convincing fashion on the February 4, 2002, episode of Raw. Stratus then attempted to regain the title for several months, including competing in a triple threat match at WrestleMania X8 against Lita and Jazz in her hometown of Toronto, but failed to win the match. While chasing after the Women's Championship, Stratus won the WWE Hardcore Championship on May 6, pinning Crash Holly after Bubba Ray Dudley hit him over the head with a trash can. She lost the title to Steven Richards soon afterward however, due to the stipulation that the belt was to be defended 24/7 as long as there was a referee present. One week later, she won the Women's Championship for the second time in a tag team match with Bubba Ray Dudley where she faced Richards and Jazz, where the Hardcore Championship was also on the line. Stratus landed a hard metal trash can shot to Jazz's head, which badly weakened her and allowed Stratus to win easily. During this time, Stratus began wrestling solely on the Raw brand after being drafted in the WWF Brand Extension.

Stratus' second reign as champion came to an end on June 23, when she was defeated at King of the Ring by Molly Holly. The two Divas continued their storyline feud for the next three months. After a failed attempt to win the title in July, Stratus won the championship for the third time at Unforgiven. While feuding with Holly, Stratus was also involved in an angle with new Diva Victoria, who held a storyline grudge against Stratus, claiming she was betrayed by Stratus when they both worked as fitness models. The two competed in several title matches, the first taking place on the September 30 episode of Raw, which saw Stratus win via disqualification after being knocked unconscious from a chair shot from Victoria. Stratus would again retain the championship against Victoria at No Mercy, before ultimately dropping it at Survivor Series, where Victoria won the title in a Hardcore match. Stratus attempted to regain the title from Victoria on the November 25 episode of Raw, but was defeated. Stratus and Victoria took part in the main event of the December 9, 2002, edition of Raw where they were in an intergender Tables match, with Stratus teaming with The Dudley Boyz and Victoria teaming with Chris Jericho and Christian; the match ended in victory for Team Stratus when she Powerbombed Victoria through a table. Stratus once again unsuccessfully challenged for the title at Armageddon in a triple threat match also featuring Jacqueline. On the January 27, 2003, episode of Raw, Stratus was once again unsuccessful in challenging Victoria for the championship, this time in a Chicago street fight. Immediately after this defeat, Stratus was beaten down and destroyed further in a brutal attack by the returning Jazz.

On March 17, 2003, Victoria and Steven Richards defeated Jazz and Stratus in a tag team match when Jazz walked out on Stratus. After the match, Jeff Hardy saved Stratus from an attack by Victoria and Richards and then kissed her, resulting in Stratus becoming Hardy's on-screen girlfriend once more. The two would talk and kiss backstage, compete as an intergender tag team, and come to each other's aid when in danger during singles competition. At no point was their previous relationship acknowledged. The storyline was suddenly dropped when WWE released Hardy in April. This marked the second time in two years that a romance between Stratus and Hardy abruptly ended due to a setback in one of their personal lives. In neither instance did the angle fully play out or reach a conclusion.

At WrestleMania XIX, Stratus ended her feud with Victoria by defeating her and Jazz to capture her fourth Women's Championship. Following WrestleMania XIX, Stratus entered a feud with Jazz following a match on the April 7 episode of Raw where Stratus defeated Jazz while Jazz's foot was on the rope. The following week on Raw, Jazz defeated Stratus cleanly via submission in a tag team match also featuring Ivory and Victoria. On the April 21 episode of Raw, Stratus was forced to team with Spike Dudley in a match against the Dudley Boyz. The match ended in a no contest after Bubba Ray Dudley destroyed Stratus, allowing Jazz to run down to the ring and hit an unconscious Stratus with a Bitchlock on to a table. Stratus would eventually lose the title to Jazz at the pay-per-view, Backlash. The Raw after Backlash, Eric Bischoff ordered a No Disqualification match between him and Stratus. If Stratus won, she would get a championship rematch the next week; if Bischoff won, he would get to spend a night with her. Bischoff would go on to win the match following interference from Jazz, though the stipulation was nullified when Linda McMahon confronted him after the match. The following week on Raw, Stratus received a rematch against Jazz for the title but was defeated. Stratus was once again unsuccessful in challenging for the title in a fatal four-way match on May 18, at Judgment Day.

==== Teaming and feuding with Lita (2003–2005) ====
In the following months, Stratus was placed into an alliance with Gail Kim. It was short-lived, however, as Kim turned on Stratus and teamed with Molly Holly, putting the women in a storyline feud. The duo defeated Stratus and several tag team partners until Stratus allied herself with a returning Lita. The team defeated Kim and Holly in several matches, including a match at Unforgiven. Stratus began an on-screen romance with Chris Jericho during the November 10 episode of Raw when she agreed to go on a date with him. Subsequently, they participated in an intergender tag team match as partners on December 1. After the match, Stratus overheard Jericho talking to then-heel, Christian, who was involved in an on-screen romance with Lita at the time, about who could sleep with their respective woman first. One week later, Stratus and Lita confronted the men about their actions, leading to a feud between the two men and women which resulted in a "Battle of the Sexes" tag team match at Armageddon, which the women lost. A rematch the next night ended in a no contest. Her relationship with Jericho continued into the next year with a new angle of Stratus developing feelings for Jericho. Christian would also briefly turn face once again, but only revealed to be a hoax as he would attack and defeat her in a match ordered by Eric Bischoff. This would start a feud between Christian and Jericho, who was defending Stratus. During their match at WrestleMania XX, however, Stratus turned heel by betraying Jericho and siding with Christian. Stratus claimed her reasons for siding with Christian were that he was a "real man", and Jericho was a "love sick puppy". The duo feuded with Jericho for several months and competed in a 2-on-1 Handicap match at Backlash. The team of Stratus and Christian were joined by "problem solver" Tyson Tomko the next night on Raw.

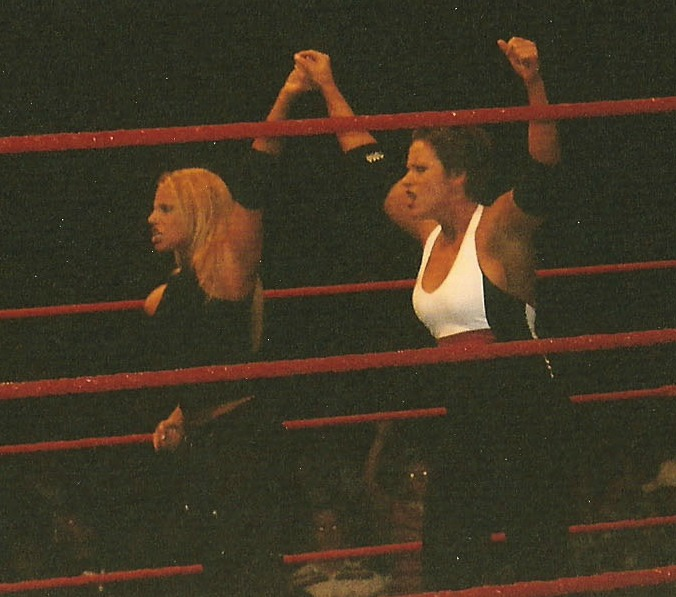
Stratus (left) along with Molly Holly during a WWE house show in October 2004

Stratus won the WWE Women's Championship for a fifth time at Bad Blood on June 13. She defended the title until she suffered a legitimate broken hand in July that caused her to be out of action for approximately a month. Upon her return, she continued to defend the title against numerous challengers before losing the championship to Lita on December 6, when both women wrestled in the main event of Raw for the championship. Stratus recaptured the title for the sixth time a month later at New Year's Revolution, after Lita suffered a legitimate knee injury during the match. Stratus was originally booked to lose the championship back to Lita at WrestleMania 21, but due to Lita's injury, she was not cleared to wrestle. A new angle was then developed between Stratus and 2004 Raw Diva Search winner Christy Hemme over jealousy of Hemme's Playboy magazine exposure, with Stratus attacking Hemme with a Chick Kick and spray painting the word "slut" across her back. Stratus was challenged by Hemme, who later revealed she was being trained by Lita, for a championship match at WrestleMania 21, where Stratus successfully retained her championship. Stratus would then demand a rematch against Hemme the next night on Raw; before the match started, Stratus hit Hemme again with the Chick Kick, and re-injured Lita's knee. The next week, after losing a tag team match, Stratus was chased around the arena by Lita's storyline husband, Kane, narrowly escaping. The week after, Stratus almost got chokeslammed again onto the stage, but Viscera saved her. Stratus would then form a short-lived alliance with Viscera, who was ordered to protect her.

==== Final matches and first retirement (2005–2006) ====
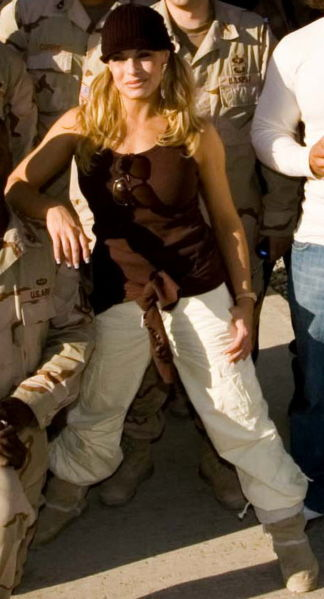
Trish Stratus at the WWE's 2005 Tribute to the Troops event

In May 2005, Stratus was sidelined with the Women's Championship after suffering a herniated disc. This left the company without a Women's Champion for four months, as Stratus remained the champion during the time of her injury. She returned to Raw on September 12, 2005, as a face by siding with Ashley Massaro against Vince's Devils (Candice Michelle, Victoria and Torrie Wilson). The feud also involved the debuting Mickie James, who introduced herself as Stratus' biggest fan. In November, during the Eddie Guerrero Tribute Show, Stratus took part in an inter-promotional Divas battle royal that was won by SmackDown! Diva Melina. The two fought at Survivor Series, with Stratus defeating Melina. Stratus and Mickie James continued teaming together in late 2005, while James became increasingly obsessed with Stratus.

The odd relationship between Stratus and James continued into 2006, with the two Divas competing against each other in a title match at New Year's Revolution, where Stratus emerged victorious. The duo briefly reconciled on the March 18 Saturday Night's Main Event XXXII, teaming together to defeat Candice Michelle and Victoria; however, after the match, James turned on Stratus and attacked her. A match at WrestleMania 22 saw Stratus lose the Women's Championship to James, ending her 448-day reign. During a rematch at Backlash, Stratus suffered a legitimate dislocated shoulder after taking a bump to the outside of the ring. While she was rehabilitating for six weeks, she continued to appear on-screen.

Stratus returned to the ring on June 26 on Raw, where she competed in a Women's Championship match with Mickie James. Stratus would go on to lose the match, thus finally ending their nine-month long storyline. On the same night, she started a romantic angle with Carlito after he saved her from an ambush by Melina and Johnny Nitro. They competed as a team, winning a mixed tag team match against Melina and Nitro at Saturday Night's Main Event XXXIII on July 15. As a couple, Stratus and Carlito briefly feuded with Edge and Lita (who turned heel) after the pair interrupted Stratus' title match with Mickie James. The two couples competed in several tag team matches, including a six-person tag team match where Edge, Lita and Randy Orton defeated Stratus, Carlito and John Cena after Orton RKO'd Stratus and Lita followed up with the pin. Stratus' last match on Raw occurred on September 11, 2006, where she defeated former rival Mickie James. In late August, Lita stated that Stratus would retire at Unforgiven, which was later confirmed by Stratus. At Unforgiven on September 17, in her hometown of Toronto, Stratus defeated Lita with fellow Canadian Bret Hart's signature submission manoeuvre, the Sharpshooter. Her victory earned her her seventh and final Women's Championship, the most in WWE history, retiring as the champion. The title was vacated soon after.

==== Part-time appearances and WWE Hall of Famer (2007–2019) ====
Stratus and Lita made a special appearance on December 10, 2007, during Raw's 15th Anniversary special, attacking Jillian Hall. The following year, Stratus appeared on Raw in Toronto on May 5, 2008, in a backstage segment involving Ron Simmons and Trevor Murdoch. Stratus wrestled on the December 22, 2008, episode of Raw, when she and John Cena defeated Santino Marella and her former on-screen protégé Beth Phoenix in a mixed tag team match. On September 14, 2009, Stratus served as the guest hostess of Raw, and participated in a six-person tag team match, teaming with Montel Vontavious Porter and Mark Henry to defeat Phoenix, Chris Jericho, and Big Show.

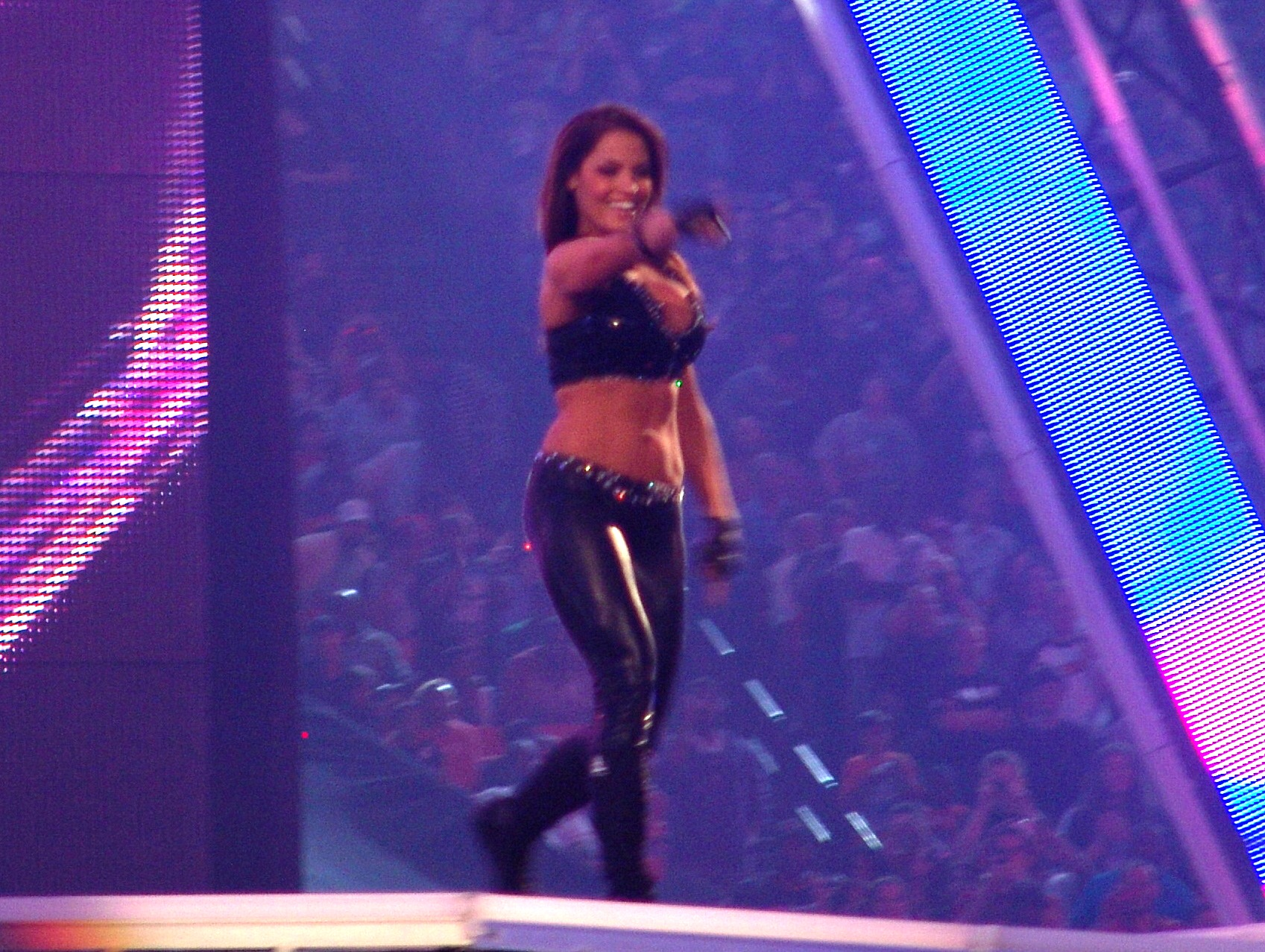
Stratus making her entrance at WrestleMania XXVII in April 2011

Stratus made a surprise appearance at the 2011 Elimination Chamber pay-per-view to announce that she would be a trainer on the revival of WWE Tough Enough and stopped LayCool (Layla & Michelle McCool) from attacking Kelly Kelly. The following month, on March 14, she lost a singles match to Vickie Guerrero due to interference from LayCool and Dolph Ziggler. After the match, John Morrison and Raw guest star Nicole "Snooki" Polizzi came to her aid. At WrestleMania XXVII, Stratus, Snooki, and Morrison defeated the team of Ziggler and LayCool. The night after WrestleMania, on Raw, Stratus and Morrison defeated Guerrero and Ziggler. She also appeared on Raw on June 6 and SmackDown on September 16. The following year, on July 23, 2012, she made a guest appearance on Raw's 1000th episode.

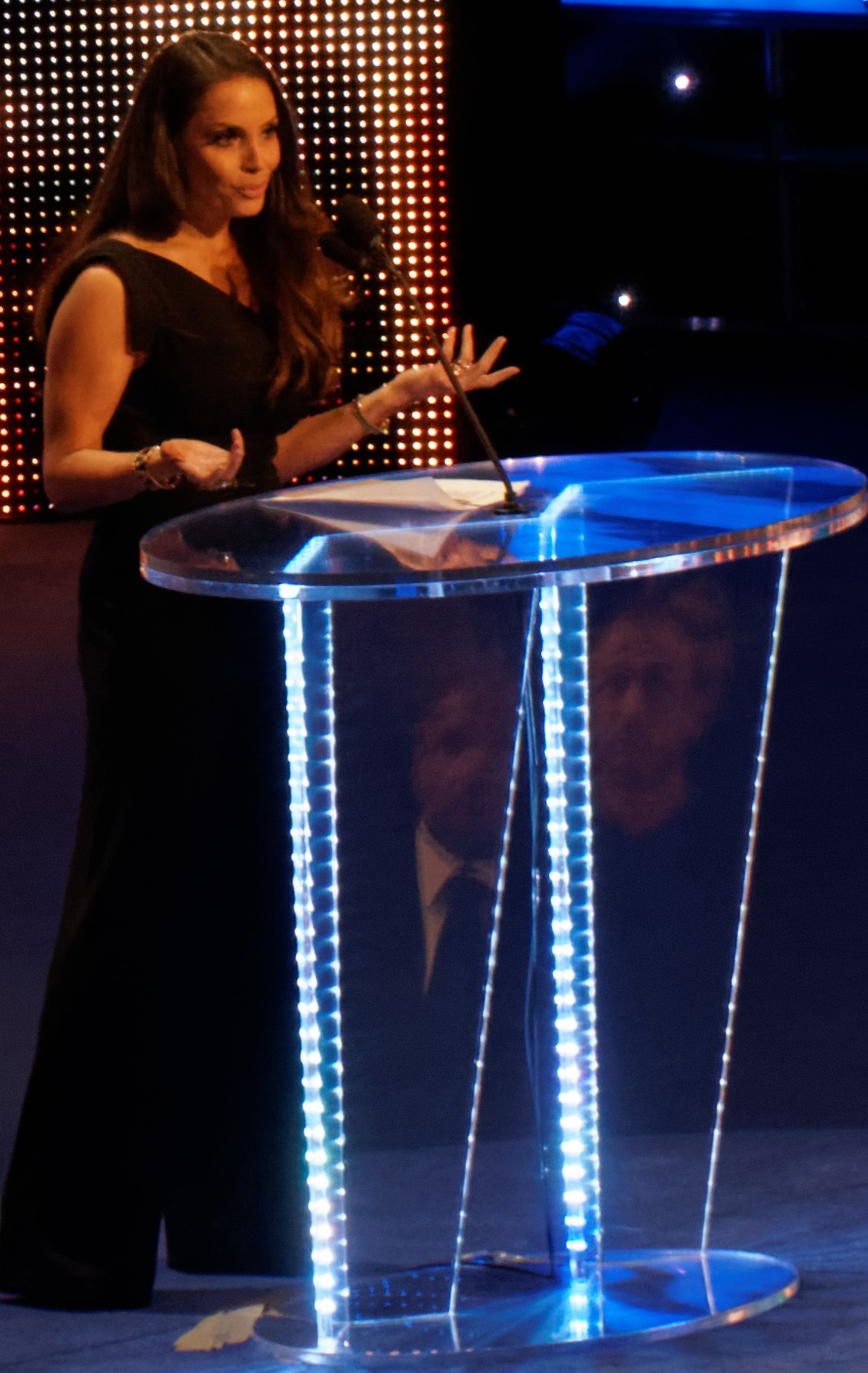
Stratus at the 2014 WWE Hall of Fame

On the January 28, 2013, episode of Raw, Stratus was announced as a WWE Hall of Fame inductee as part of the 2013 class, Stratus chose Stephanie McMahon to induct her into the Hall of Fame in April. The following year, Stratus inducted Lita into the WWE Hall of Fame. On August 16, 2016, Stratus appeared on WWE Network special WWE 24: Women's Evolution, discussing the history of the women back in her era known as the Attitude Era and also her rivalry with Lita.

On January 22, 2018, during the WWE Raw 25 Years anniversary episode, Stratus was amongst a group of women honoured as some of the greatest female superstars in the twenty-five-year history of the show, along with The Bella Twins, Maryse, Kelly Kelly, Lilian Garcia, Torrie Wilson, Michelle McCool, Terri Runnels, Maria Kanellis, and Jacqueline. Six days later, Stratus was a surprise entrant in the inaugural all-women's Royal Rumble match at the event. Stratus entered in the final spot, number 30, and eliminated Nia Jax, Mickie James and Natalya. Stratus' interaction with James garnered a considerable crowd reaction. Stratus was amongst the final five women in the match, before being eliminated by Sasha Banks.

On August 18, 2018, WWE announced that Stratus would make her in-ring return at WWE Evolution in singles competition against Alexa Bliss. On the August 27, 2018, episode of Raw, Stratus made a surprise appearance in Toronto, interrupting Elias and confronting him for talking down her hometown. The two exchanged insults, culminating in Stratus slapping him. Later in the night, Stratus, Ronda Rousey and Natalya were confronted by Alexa Bliss, Mickie James, and Alicia Fox. Stratus later appeared at ringside with Rousey during a one-on-one match between Natalya and Alicia Fox. She was then seen backstage during the show in a segment with Ronda and Natalya as well as the returning Bella Twins, Nikki and Brie. On the October 8 episode of Raw, Stratus would cut a promo against Bliss ahead of WWE Evolution. Bliss, along with Mickie James, came to the ring to confront Stratus, challenging her to a tag match at Evolution with herself and James instead. Stratus agreed, announcing Lita (who was originally scheduled to face James at Evolution) as her tag partner. At the Evolution event, Trish and Lita defeated Mickie James and Alicia Fox, who replaced Bliss due to injury.

On the July 30, 2019, episode of SmackDown, Stratus returned as a guest of Jerry Lawler's "The King's Court" in–ring segment. Charlotte Flair interrupted the two and issued a challenge to Stratus to a match at SummerSlam, which Stratus accepted. At SummerSlam, in her hometown of Toronto, the returning Stratus lost to Flair by submission.

==== Full-time return (2022–2023) ====
On the August 22, 2022 episode of Raw, Stratus made an appearance for the first time in three years, where she was interrupted by Damage CTRL (Bayley, Dakota Kai, and Iyo Sky).

On the February 27, 2023, episode of Raw, Stratus helped Lita and Becky Lynch defeat Damage CTRL for the WWE Women's Tag Team Championship by taking out Damage CTRL's leader, Bayley, who attempted to interfere. The following week, she announced that she would be teaming up with Lita and Lynch to face Damage CTRL in a six-woman tag team match at WrestleMania 39. Stratus would appear on every episode of Raw in the build to their match. At WrestleMania 39, Stratus, Lita and Lynch were successful in defeating Damage CTRL.

On the April 10 episode of Raw, Stratus teamed with Lynch to defend the WWE Women's Tag Team Championship against Liv Morgan and Raquel Rodriguez on the behalf of an injured Lita, who had been attacked by a mystery assailant backstage. Morgan pinned Stratus with a roll-up, costing Lita and Lynch the titles. Following the match, Stratus attacked Lynch, turning heel. The following week on Raw, Stratus revealed herself as the mystery assailant who attacked Lita. She was frustrated by the two appearing as Lynch's sidekicks and a perceived lack of respect for her impact on the women's division. She established a new catchphrase, "Thank You Trish". On April 27, 2023, WWE announced that Stratus would be eligible during the second night of the 2023 Draft. Stratus was once again drafted to the Raw brand in the fourth round as their seventh pick, the thirteenth of that night overall.

On May 8, 2023, Stratus taunted Lynch who had not been seen since losing the WWE Women's Tag Team Championships, and insulted her infant daughter Roux. However, Lynch would then return and attack Stratus with a Manhandle Slam. Lynch vowed to stand up for her family, and challenged Stratus for a singles match at Night of Champions in Saudi Arabia. The match was made official during a contract signing on Raw in the following week, where Stratus once again claimed sole responsibility for the growth in opportunities for women in WWE. In response, Lynch stated that Stratus was never as good as many remember her to be and made reference to her barking like a dog for Vince McMahon in the build up to WrestleMania X-7 in 2001. At the event, Stratus defeated Lynch with the help of Zoey Stark, who hid under the ring and attacked Lynch during the match.

Stratus and Stark continued their partnership, and on the June 19 episode of Raw, Stratus won the qualification match for the women's Money in the Bank ladder match against Raquel Rodriguez by disqualification after Lynch attacked her during the match. On July 1, 2023, Stratus competed at the namesake event in London in her first appearance in a ladder match against Becky Lynch, Zoey Stark, Bayley, Iyo Sky, and Zelina Vega. Stratus worked with Stark throughout the match to prevent Lynch from winning, including a failed attempt to restrain her with handcuffs. Stratus, Stark and Lynch were defeated when Iyo Sky claimed the briefcase and won the match.

Lynch eventually earned a rematch against Stratus by defeating Zoey Stark in singles action on Raw, which was scheduled by WWE Official Adam Pearce for a future episode occurring two weeks later. The match not being included on the card for SummerSlam received backlash from fans on social media, with reports suggesting that both Stratus and Lynch had real-life frustrations with the decision. Further reports claimed that the match was not included due to time constraints, which was seemingly confirmed by Triple H, who defending the decision by stating: "There was a lot of banter I saw this week about matches being cut, which is the word that was used. But nothing was cut. There was no card announced. If we don't have more things in the pocket ready to go for a PLE than can fit in the PLE, I've done a terrible job." On August 15, Stratus and Lynch's match ended in a double count-out. Adam Pearce declared that the two would have a future rematch inside of a steel cage, which would be a first for Stratus, at Payback. Stratus, who was aided by Stark, ended up losing the match to Lynch concluding their feud. Stark then turned on Stratus after Stratus slapped and berated Stark.

==== 25th Anniversary Tour (2024–present) ====
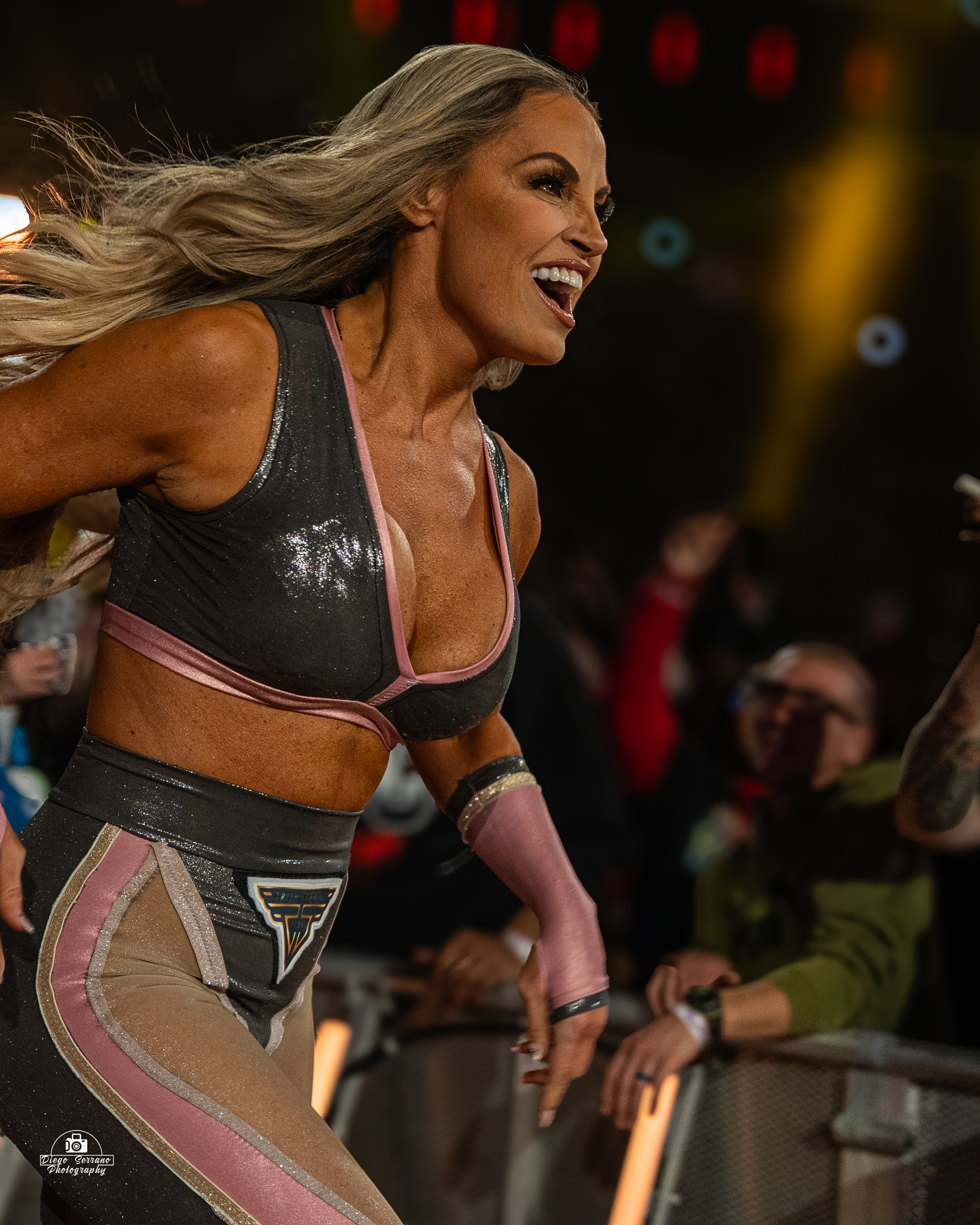
Stratus returning in the 2025 Women's Royal Rumble match to start her 25th Anniversary Tour

During the WrestleMania XL pre-show Stratus returned for a backstage interview with Cathy Kelley, as a face, where she was asked about Becky Lynch's match against Rhea Ripley for the Women's World Championship. When asked if she would return to WWE again, Trish paused before answering, "you just never know." On July 6, Stratus would host Money in the Bank in her hometown at Toronto.

She made her in-ring return in the Royal Rumble on February 1, 2025, entering as the 25th entrant to coincide with her 25th anniversary in WWE. She eliminated Candice LeRae before being eliminated by Nia Jax. Following this, Stratus returned on the Smackdown brand and began a feud with Nia Jax and Candice LeRae, whilst at the same time aligning with Tiffany Stratton, the WWE Women's Champion. At Elimination Chamber on March 1, Stratus teamed up with Stratton and faced Jax and LeRae in a winning effort.

At Evolution on July 13, Stratus unsuccessfully challenged Stratton for the WWE Women's Championship in her first world title match since 2006, but received a standing ovation after the match.

== Legacy ==
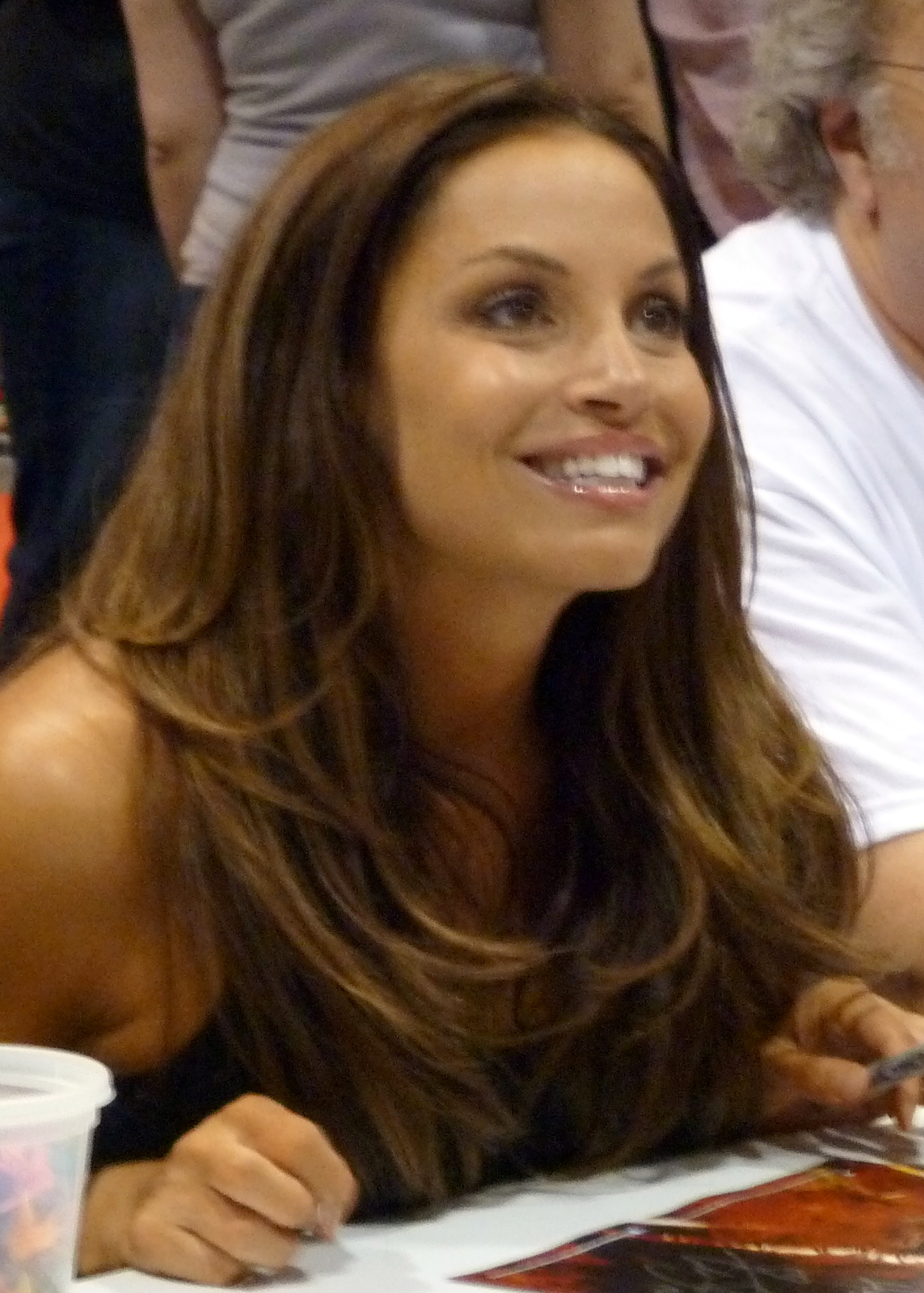
Stratus in 2011

Stratus is widely regarded as the greatest female superstar of her generation and by many as the greatest female wrestler of all time. Stratus is cited as an inspiration for several female wrestlers, such as: Alexa Bliss, Bayley, Carmella, Deonna Purrazzo, Emma, Kelly Kelly, Kia Stevens, Leila Grey, Mandy Rose, Maria Kanellis, Melina Perez, Michelle McCool, Natalya, Rosa Mendes, Santana Garrett, Sasha Banks, Shazza McKenzie, and Taryn Terrell.

During a September 2020 episode of Raw, Mandy Rose paid tribute to Stratus by wearing pink gear identical to an attire worn by Stratus in the early 2000s. She later cited Stratus as her role model. She added; "She's always been my inspiration, and still to this day [she is]." Zelina Vega asserted that Stratus and Lita inspired her to become a professional wrestler, while fellow WWE Hall of Famer Sunny stated: "I do have to say, I mean the only person that I actually could sit and watch a match would be Trish Stratus. I give her all the props in the world. She's like the one person who came after me that I actually have 100% respect for because she came from nowhere and worked so hard and learned so much. She's the kind of person that does respect the business, you know? She was in it because she loved it not because it was a quick dollar."

Stratus's feud with Mickie James in 2006 has been an inspiration to Sasha Banks's rivalry with Bayley. Banks has cited Stratus is the one performer from the past she most wants to wrestle. Banks added, "It's going to be Trish Stratus because she was just the top of the women's division of her time. She was just the best, she was beautiful, she was athletic, and she killed it, and inspired me." Jerry Lawler called Stratus his all-time favourite female superstar. Booker T in one interview has cited Stratus as the best of all time for women's wrestling while adding "She was the one that broke that barrier more than any other woman on the roster."

On May 15, 2023, Stratus was awarded the key of Niagara Falls by its mayor, Jim Diodati.

== Personal life ==
Stratus married her high school sweetheart and boyfriend of fourteen years, Ron Fisico, on September 30, 2006. Her bridal gown was featured on a cover of Today's Bride magazine. Stratus and Fisico have two children, a son born in 2013 and a daughter born in 2017. Fellow wrestler and former on-screen rival Amy Dumas, better known by the ring name Lita, is her son's godmother. Stratus is a fan of ice hockey and supports the Toronto Maple Leafs of the NHL.

Stratus has also been involved with numerous charities such as Ronald McDonald House, Dreams Take Flight, and the Special Olympics. From 2001, she was a spokesperson for the World Natural Sports Association.

=== Business ventures ===
On March 29, 2008, she participated in the Island Triathlon Series as part of a celebrity relay team to help raise money for Dignitas International. In 2008, Stratus opened a yoga studio named Stratusphere in the suburbs of Toronto, Ontario. The studio is billed as "Canada's largest eco-friendly yoga studio". In 2009, Stratusphere was awarded Top Choice Awards' Best New Business award, and the following year, Stratus won the award for Business Woman of the Year. The studio won Top Choice Awards' Best Yoga Studio in Vaughan award in 2013. The studio was closed on March 31, 2015.

On December 28, 2020, it was announced that Stratus' online retail platform named Stratusphere Shop was awarded a 2021 Canadian Business Award for Best Celebrity News Platform & Online Retailer. Stratusphere Shop was also awarded the Business Excellence Award for Best Women's Merchandise Platform in Canada.

== Other media ==
=== Television ===
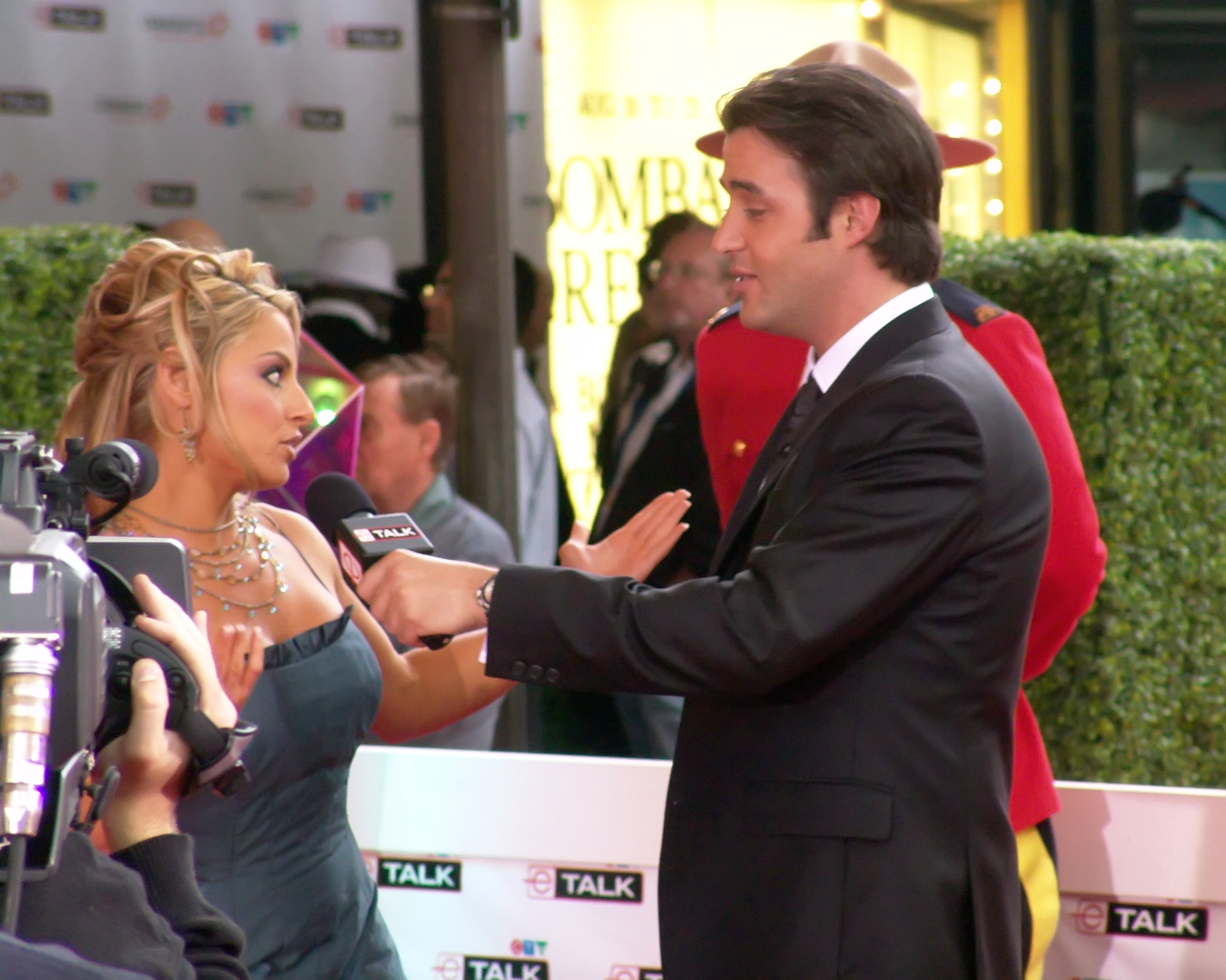
Stratus being interviewed by Ben Mulroney

On June 3, 2006, she hosted the Canada's Walk of Fame induction ceremony and performed a song and dance number inspired by the soundtrack from the film Chicago at the event. During the show, Stratus ad libbed a kiss with fellow Canadian actress Pamela Anderson.

From late November 2006 to mid-January 2007, Stratus temporarily moved to Muncie, Indiana, for the CBS reality show Armed & Famous. She was given a spot in the series after Paul Heyman had mentioned her name to CBS. The concept was that she was one of five celebrities who trained as volunteer officers with the Muncie Police Department. After finishing her training, Stratus and her real life officer partner were followed around by a camera crew while going on legitimate police calls. Although the show was scheduled to broadcast seven episodes starting on January 10, 2007, CBS cancelled the series after just four of the episodes were aired. After the cancellation of Armed & Famous, Stratus hosted The Second City's Next Comedy Legend. The contest was similar to the style of America's Next Top Model, with Stratus portraying the "Tyra Banks" role as contact between the contestants and judges.

Stratus is the host and subject of the show Stratusphere, which debuted in 2008 on the Travel + Escape television channel. The show follows Stratus as she visits different locations around the world to participate in local sports and adventure. Bill Harris wrote that, "Every week, Stratus embarks on a trip in search of exotic locations and daring physical challenges. In the first episode, for example, Stratus is in Kochi, India, where she learns the ancient martial art of kalarippayattu, progressing from fighting with sticks to fighting with metal swords. Through the 10-episode run of Stratusphere, Stratus does everything from reindeer racing in Norway to bungee jumping in Bali. Her athleticism obviously sets Stratusphere apart from most travel shows." Stratus also guest-starred in the Canadian show Da Kink in My Hair new season, which started on February 12, 2009. In 2009, Stratus became a spokesperson for sports betting website, Sports Interaction.

In 2020, Stratus made a cameo appearance in a TV Christmas movie for Fox called Christmas in the Rockies.

From 2022 to 2024, Stratus appeared as a judge on Canada's Got Talent, along with Howie Mandel, Lilly Singh, and Kardinal Offishall.

=== Film ===
Stratus starred in the Canadian independent film, Bail Enforcers, which marked her acting debut. She played a bounty hunter named Jules Taylor, which released on April 19, 2011, premiering at ActionFest 2011. The movie was then released on DVD as Bounty Hunters.

Stratus co-starred in the 2015 film Gridlocked, as the antagonist Gina.

In January 2022, Stratus announced that she had been cast in the lead role for an unnamed Christmas movie which would be released at the end of the year. The movie was later revealed to be entitled Christmas in Rockwell, where she played a character named Alyssa Strader. On June 10, 2025, it was reported that Stratus was cast in a Canadian action-comedy filmed named Karate Ghost, where she would portray the character of Susan Fanshawe.

=== Filmography ===
Year	Title	Role
2011	Bail Enforcers	Jules
2015	Gridlocked	Gina
2022	Christmas in Rockwell	Alyssa Strader
2026	Karate Ghost	Susan Fanshawe

=== Television ===
Year	Title	Role	Notes
2003	Mad TV	Various	Season 8, episode 18
2004	Mad TV	Various	Season 9, episode 18
2004	Royal Canadian Air Farce	Various	
2007	Armed & Famous	Herself	5 episodes
2007	The Second City's Next Comedy Legend	Host	
2008	Stratusphere	Herself	
2009	Da Kink in My Hair	Herself	Season 2, Episode 1: "Everything in Its Right Place"
2011	WWE Tough Enough	Trainer	
2020	Corner Gas Animated	Shauna	Voice; Season 3 episode 4: "Sound and Fury"
2020	Christmas in the Rockies	Marie Brown	TV movie
2022–2024	Canada's Got Talent	Judge	3 seasons

=== Music videos ===
Year	Title	Role	Notes	Artist
2013	Somebody's Gonna Pay	Bartender	Music Video	Mickie James

=== Video games ===
Year	Title	Notes
2000	WWF No Mercy	Video game debut
2000	WWF SmackDown! 2: Know Your Role	
2001	WWF With Authority!	
2001	WWF SmackDown! Just Bring It	
2002	WWF Raw	
2002	WWE WrestleMania X8	
2002	WWE SmackDown! Shut Your Mouth	
2003	WWE Crush Hour	
2003	WWE WrestleMania XIX	
2003	WWE Raw 2	
2003	WWE SmackDown Here Comes the Pain	
2004	WWE Day of Reckoning	Cover athlete
2004	WWE SmackDown! vs. Raw	
2005	WWE WrestleMania 21	
2005	WWE Day of Reckoning 2	
2005	WWE SmackDown! vs. Raw 2006	
2006	WWE SmackDown vs. Raw 2007	
2009	WWE SmackDown vs. Raw 2010	
2011	WWE '12	Downloadable content
2012	WWE '13	
2014	WWE SuperCard	Mobile game
2015	WWE Immortals	Mobile game
2015	WWE 2K16	Downloadable content
2016	WWE 2K17	
2017	WWE 2K18	
2017	WWE Champions	Mobile game
2017	WWE Mayhem	Mobile game
2018	WWE 2K19	
2019	WWE 2K20	
2019	WWE Universe	
2020	WWE 2K Battlegrounds	
2022	WWE 2K22	
2023	WWE 2K23	
2024	WWE 2K24	
2025	WWE 2K25	
2026	WWE 2K26	Cover athlete of the attitude era special edition

=== Awards and nominations ===
Year	Award	Category	Nominated work	Result	Ref.
2009	Top Choice Awards	Top New Business	Stratusphere yoga studio	Won	
2010	Top Choice Awards	Business Woman of the Year	Owner of Stratusphere yoga studio	Won	
2013	Top Choice Awards	Best Yoga Studio in Vaughan	Stratusphere yoga studio	Won	
2021	Canadian Business Awards	Best Celebrity News Platform & Online Retailer	Stratusphere Shop	Won	
2021	Canadian Business Awards	Best Women's Merchandise Platform in Canada	Stratusphere Shop	Won	
2023	Canadian Screen Awards	Host or presenter, factual or reality/competition	Canada's Got Talent	Nominated	
2024	Canadian Screen Awards	Host or presenter, factual or reality/competition	Canada's Got Talent	Nominated	

== Championships and accomplishments ==
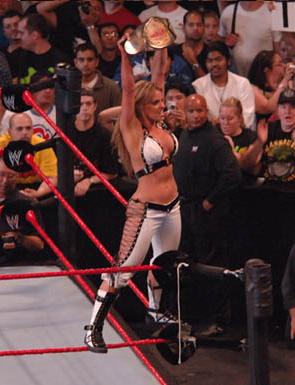
Stratus is a seven-time WWF/WWE Women's Champion

- The Baltimore Sun
  - Best Female Wrestler of the Decade (2010)
- Canadian Pro-Wrestling Hall of Fame
  - Class of 2021
- Cauliflower Alley Club
  - Iron Mike Mazurki Award (2016)
- Fighting Spirit Magazine
  - Double X Award (2006)
  - Three Degrees Award (2006)
- George Tragos/Lou Thesz Professional Wrestling Hall of Fame
  - Lou Thesz Award (2020)
- Guinness World Records
  - World record: Most WWE Women's Championships (7 times)
- International Professional Wrestling Hall of Fame
  - Class of 2025
- Ontario Sports Hall of Fame
  - Sandy Hawley Community Service Award (2017)
- Pro Wrestling Illustrated
  - Woman of the Year (2002, 2003, 2005 and 2006)
  - Woman of the Decade (2000–2009)
- Richmond Hill Sports Hall of Fame
  - Class of 2025
- World Wrestling Federation / Entertainment / WWE
  - WWF/E Women's Championship (7 times)
  - WWE Hardcore Championship (1 time)
  - WWE Hall of Fame (Class of 2013)
  - Babe of the Year (2001–2003)
  - Diva of the Decade (2003)
  - Ranked No. 1 of the top 50 Greatest WWE Female Superstars of all time (2021)
- Wrestling Observer Newsletter
  - Worst Worked Match of the Year (2002) with Bradshaw vs. Christopher Nowinski and Jackie Gayda on WWE Raw, July 7, 2002

== Footnotes ==
- Leiker & Vancil (2003). WWE Unscripted. Pocket Books. ISBN 0-7434-7761-8.
