= Bail Enforcers =

- Teaser poster
- Directed by: Patrick McBrearty
- Written by: Reese Eveneshen
- Produced by: Chad Archibald; Cody Calahan; Michael Paszt
- Starring: Trish Stratus; Christian Bako; Boomer Phillips
- Cinematography: Justin G. Dyck
- Music by: Norman Orenstein
- Production company: Black Fawn Films
- Distributed by: Star Entertainment (India)
- Release date: April 19, 2011 (ActionFest)
- Running time: 80 minutes
- Country: Canada
- Language: English

Bail Enforcers (later released as Bounty Hunters) is a 2011 film starring Trish Stratus, Christian Bako and Boomer Phillips directed by Patrick McBrearty. It marks the acting debut of WWE wrestler Trish Stratus in a feature-length film.

== Synopsis ==
A group of people which specializes in catching people who have skipped bail or have a bounty on their heads. One night the group, consisting of Jules (Trish Stratus), Chase (Boomer Phillips), and Ridley (Frank J. Zupancic), catches an informant with a $100,000 bounty on his head. A mobster who wants this man for his own purposes offers the group a million dollars to turn the informant over to him.

== Cast ==
- Trish Stratus as Jules
- Christian Bako as Francis
- Boomer Phillips as Chase Thomson
- Frank J. Zupancic as Ridley
- Emily Alatalo as Hal's Girl
- Enrico DiFede as Mario Antonio
- Joseph Rafla as Hal Lambino
- Andrea James Lui as Ruby
- Richard Ha as Deacon
- Rodrigo Fernandez-Stoll as Peter
- Marc-Andre Boulanger as Matt Plant
- Shealyn Angus as Mimi
- Craig Cyr as Dirty Cop
- Paige Albrecht as Gwen, Health Club Receptionist
- Jennifer Polansky as Sally, Waitress in Diner
- Yiren Stark as Massage Parlour Hostess
- Misha Highstead as Dancer
- Alyson Bath as Strip Club Waitress
- Nanako Mizutani as Massage Parlour Girl #1
- Hope Champion as Massage Parlour Girl #2
- Tram Le as Massage Parlour Girl #3
- Rizi Marielle Macaranas as Massage Parlour Girl #4
- Amanda Costa as Change Room Dancer #1
- Sabrina Couture as Change Room Dancer #2
- Jennifer Gravelle as Change Room Dancer #3
- Chloe Madison as Change Room Dancer #4
- Kodi Lee as Change Room Dancer #5

== Awards ==
Boomer Phillips who played Chase Thomson was nominated for a Canadian Comedy Award for Best Male Performance.
