= Stephen Huszar =

Canadian actor

- Born: January 24, 1984 (age 42); Saskatoon, Saskatchewan, Canada
- Education: University of Saskatchewan
- Occupations: Actor, producer
- Years active: 2004 – present

Stephen Huszar is a Canadian film and television actor born in Saskatoon. He is first generation Canadian, his parents arriving from Hungary as immigrants when they were very young. His family tree goes back eight or nine hundred years in the Transylvania region of Romania. He graduated from the University of Saskatchewan.

== Career ==
Huszar has starred in Christmas themed TV movies for Hallmark Channel, Lifetime and Netflix, as well as a recurring role in the Ruby Herring Mysteries. In 2017, Huszar appeared as the DC comic book character Jared Morillo / Plunder in The Flash. Huszar next starred in the horror film Rabid, which was released in select theaters, digitally and on demand on 13 December 2019.

== Personal life ==
Since March 2023, Huszar has been in a relationship with American actress Katie Cassidy. The two met on the set of the Hallmark Channel movie A Royal Christmas Crush.

== Filmography ==
Film roles
			Notes
2005	Caught in the Headlights	Officer Duncan Finney	
2006	Shock to the System	Grey	
2010	Stained	Rolf	
2010	30 Days of Night: Dark Days	Eben Oleson	
2011	Faces in the Crowd	Bryce #4	
2013	The Guerilla Picture Show	Jerry	
2013	Ferocious	Steve Sherwood	
2013	Jackhammer	Entertainment talk show host	
2016	Milton's Secret	Husband	Producer
2019	Rabid	Dominic	
2019	Entropic	M	

Television roles
Year	Title	Role	Notes
2004	The Cradle Will Fall	Paramedic	TV movie
2007	The Wedding Wish	Older Tim	Lifetime (TV network)
2007	It Was One of Us	Caleb	Lifetime (TV network)
2008	Paradise Falls	Tucker Hardwood	Recurring role; 4 episodes
2008	Smallville	Stockbroker	Episode: "Instinct"
2007–2009	Corner Gas	Rec Plex Attendant / Rob	Recurring role; 2 episodes
2009	Northern Lights	Pat Galligan	Lifetime (TV network) TV Movie
2009	12 Men of Christmas	Jason Farrar	Lifetime (TV network) TV Movie
2011	Time after Time	Dr. Jeff Farley	Hallmark Channel TV Movie
2012	Fringe	Sgt. Wheeler / Guard	Recurring role; 2 episodes
2012	Continuum	Drew Laroche	Episode: "Matter of Time"
2014	Rush	Handsome Guy	Episode: "Pilot"
2014	Motive	Brett Huntley	Episode: "Abandoned"
2014	Supernatural	Demon #1	Episode: "Soul Survivor"
2014	Girlfriends' Guide to Divorce	Dave	Episode: "Rule #21: Leave Childishness to the Children"
2015	Aurora Teagarden Mystery: A Bone to Pick	Father Scott Aubrey	Hallmark Channel TV Movie
2016	Shadowhunters	Brad	Episode: "Dead Man's Party"
2016	The Rooftop Christmas Tree	John Keaton	TV movie
2017	The Flash	Jared Morillo / Plunder	Episode: "Borrowing Problems from the Future"
2017	iZombie	Ken	Episode: "Zombie Knows Best"
2017	Christmas Wedding Planner	Connor	Netflix TV Movie
2017	Magical Christmas Ornaments	Clark	Hallmark Movies & Mysteries TV Movie
2018	Hometown Holiday	Darryl	TV movie
2018	Carter	Steven Gattner	Episode: "Koji the Killer"
2018	Return to Christmas Creek	Mike Ruggles	Hallmark Movies & Mysteries TV Movie
2019	Ruby Herring: Silent Witness	Jake Killian	Hallmark Movies & Mysteries TV Movie
2019	My One & Only	Oliver	Hallmark Channel TV Movie
2019	Ruby Herring Mysteries: Her Last Breath	Jake Killian	Hallmark Movies & Mysteries TV Movie
2016–2019	Letterkenny	Yorkie	Recurring role; 10 episodes
2019	Mistletoe Magic	Luke	TV movie
2019	A Homecoming for the Holidays	Matt	Hallmark Movies & Mysteries TV Movie
2019	Un Noël Country	Matt	Téléfilm
2020	Ruby Herring Mysteries: Prediction Murder	Jake Killian	Hallmark Movies & Mysteries TV Movie
2020	Time for Us to Come Home for Christmas	Ben	Hallmark Movies & Mysteries TV Movie
2020	Supernatural	Pax	Episode: "The Gamblers"
2021	Cooking Up Love	Colin Richmond	TV movie
2021	Chesapeake Shores	Luke Tatum	Recurring role, seasons 5 & 6
2022	Christmas in Rockwell	Jake Wellsey	TV movie
2022	Undercover Holiday	Matt Lowis	Hallmark Channel TV Movie
2023	Love in Glacier National	Chris	Hallmark Channel TV Movie
2023	The Jane Mysteries: Inheritance Lost	Detective John Cameron	Hallmark Movies & Mysteries TV Movie
2023	A Royal Christmas Crush	Prince Henry	Hallmark Channel TV Movie
2023	Navigating Christmas	Peter	Hallmark Channel TV Movie
2024	Everything Puppies	Alex	Hallmark Channel TV Movie
2024	The Jane Mysteries: A Deadly Prescription	Detective John Cameron/Executive Producer	Hallmark+ TV Movie
2024	The Jane Mysteries: Murder at Moseby	Detective John Cameron/Executive Producer	Hallmark+ TV Movie
2024	The Jane Mysteries: Too Much to Lose	Detective John Cameron/Executive Producer	Hallmark+ TV Movie
2026	To Philly With Love	Nate	Hallmark Channel TV Movie
