= Lacey Chabert =

American actress (born 1982)

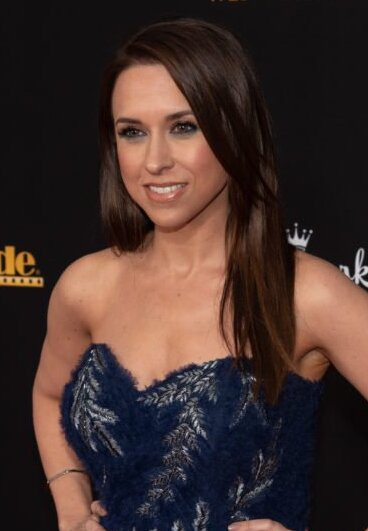
- Chabert in 2019
- Born: Lacey Nicole Chabert; September 30, 1982 (age 44); Hattiesburg, Mississippi, U.S.
- Occupations: Actress; Singer
- Years active: 1985–present
- Known for: Party of Five; Lost in Space; The Wild Thornberrys; Mean Girls; Not Another Teen Movie; Family Guy
- Spouse: David Nehdar (m. 2013)
- Children: 1

Lacey Nicole Chabert (/ʃəˈbɛər/ shə-BAIR; born September 30, 1982) is an American actress and singer. One of her first roles as a child actress was the part of Bianca Montgomery, the daughter of Erica Kane, on All My Children from 1992 to 1993. She gained further prominence for her portrayal of Claudia Salinger in the Fox television drama Party of Five (1994–2000).

In film, she has appeared in Lost in Space (1998), Not Another Teen Movie (2001), and Daddy Day Care (2003); and had leading roles as Gretchen Wieners in Mean Girls (2004), Meg Cummings in Dirty Deeds (2005), Dana Mathis in the horror remake Black Christmas (2006), and Penelope in the animated film All I Want for Christmas Is You (2017). Chabert has also appeared in more than 40 Hallmark Channel films.

Chabert's extensive voice acting roles have included Eliza Thornberry in the Nickelodeon animated series The Wild Thornberrys (1998–2004) and the feature films The Wild Thornberrys Movie and Rugrats Go Wild; Meg Griffin during the first season of the animated sitcom Family Guy in 1999; Mako in the video game Star Wars: The Old Republic (2011), superhero Zatanna Zatara in DC Comics-related media, and Princess Elise in the English dub of Sonic the Hedgehog (2006).

== Early life ==
Lacey Nicole Chabert was born on September 30, 1982 in Hattiesburg, Mississippi, and raised in nearby Purvis. Her father is Cajun from Louisiana. She has a younger brother, Tony, and an older sister, Chrissy. Their oldest sister, Wendy, died of a heart attack in November 2021. She also participated in beauty pageants as a child and was once named Miss Jr. Mississippi.

== Acting career ==
=== 1985–2003: Beginnings and breakthrough with Party of Five ===
Some of Chabert's earliest roles were in television commercials for Burger King, Triaminic, Cough Syrup, Zest and Secret Beauties dolls. In 1992–93, Chabert played the role of young Cosette in Les Misérables on Broadway. She appeared on The Broadway Kids' first album The Broadway Kids Sing Broadway (1994), where she sang her own solos on such songs as "The Girl I Mean to Be" (from The Secret Garden) and "Castle on a Cloud" (from Les Misérables). In 1994, she landed the role of Claudia Salinger on the Fox network teen/family drama series Party of Five. The show centered on the five Salinger siblings, who are orphaned after their parents are killed in a car accident caused by a drunk driver. The show received positive reviews and ran for six seasons, from September 12, 1994 to May 3, 2000. She won The Hollywood Reporter's annual YoungStar Award for Best Performance by a Young Actress in a Drama TV Series in both 1997 and 1998 for Party of Five, and was nominated three other times for her work in 1999 to 2000. The YoungStar awards honor the best film, TV, and music performances made exclusively by 6- to 18-year-olds.

Chabert made her big-screen debut starring as Penny Robinson in Lost in Space (1998). She then had a supporting role as Amanda Becker in the parody film Not Another Teen Movie (2001), and provided the voice of Aleu, the title character's daughter, in Balto 2: Wolf Quest (2002). In addition to her animation voice work as Eliza Thornberry from 1998–2004, Chabert was the voice of Meg Griffin, uncredited, on the first season of Family Guy in 1999. Mila Kunis took over the role when Chabert became too busy with schooling and her other work.

=== 2004–2013: Film success and television roles ===
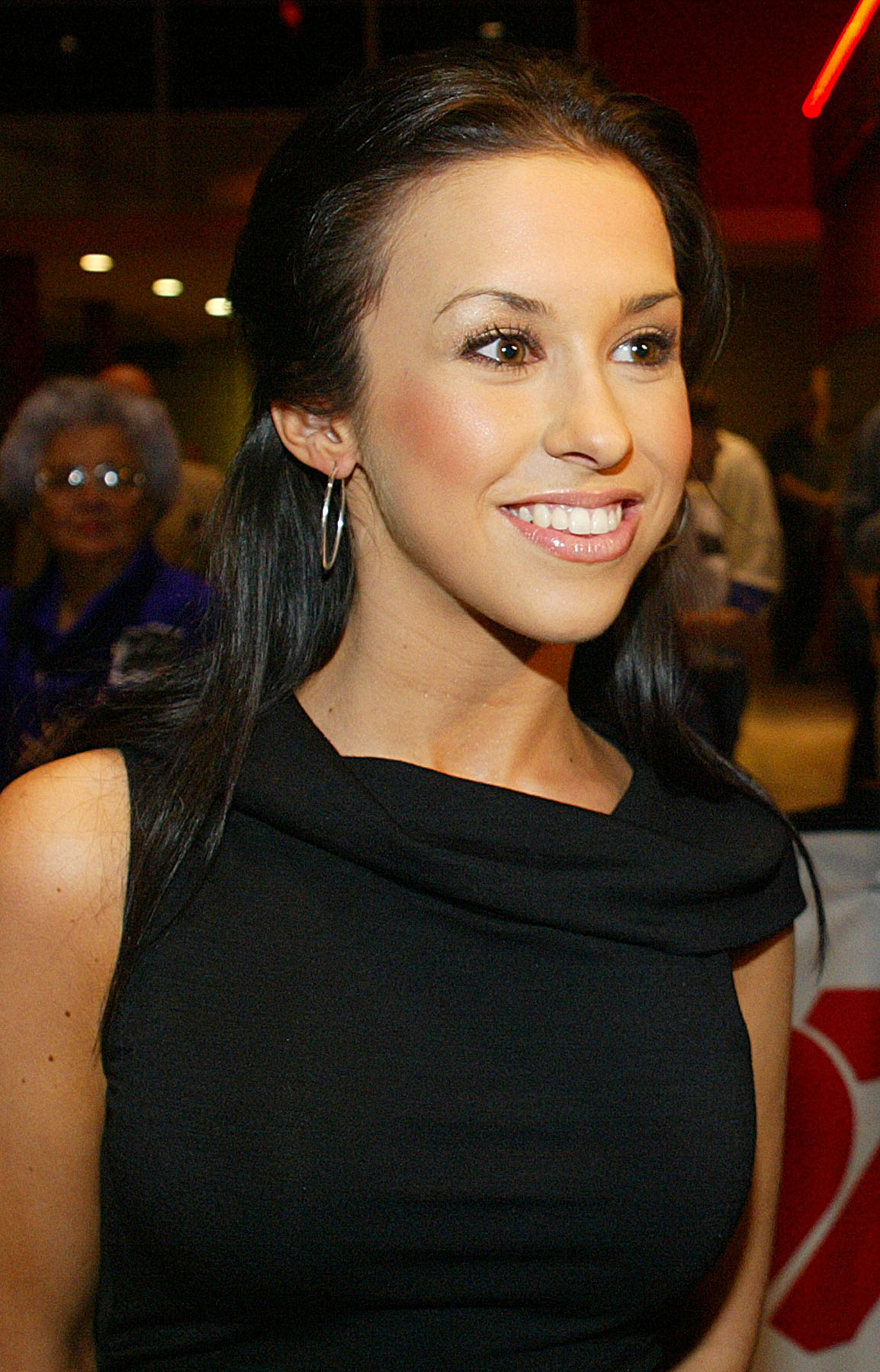
Chabert in 2007

Chabert co-starred as Gretchen Wieners, the girl who tries to make her slang term "fetch" catch on, in the hit film Mean Girls (2004). She and her co-stars Lindsay Lohan, Rachel McAdams, and Amanda Seyfried went on to win the 2005 MTV Movie Award for "Best On-Screen Team". Chabert also played the title role in The Brooke Ellison Story, a 2004 television biopic produced and directed by Christopher Reeve, based on a real-life quadriplegic woman who overcame obstacles to graduate from Harvard University.

Chabert then appeared in Hello Sister, Goodbye Life (2006) on ABC Family; had a role in a 2006 remake of the 1974 horror film Black Christmas, and in an episode of Ghost Whisperer opposite former Party of Five co-star Jennifer Love Hewitt. Her voice work in the second half of the decade included the roles of Princess Elise in the video game Sonic the Hedgehog and Gwen Stacy in The Spectacular Spider-Man animated series.

=== 2014–present: Focus on Hallmark films ===
From 2013 to 2014, Chabert had a recurring role on the ABC Family sitcom Baby Daddy as Dr. Amy Shaw. In 2015, she starred in the television film A Christmas Melody alongside Mariah Carey, Brennan Elliott, Kathy Najimy, and Fina Strazza. It was viewed by 3.95 million people when it debuted on the Hallmark Channel on December 19, 2015. In 2017, she provided her voice to the animated film All I Want for Christmas Is You, based on the book of the same title, written by Carey and Colleen Madden. The film also stars the voices of Carey, Breanna Yde and Henry Winkler. She began 2018 with another Hallmark Channel original movie as part of its Valentine's Day Countdown.

In 2019, Chabert began starring in the Crossword Mysteries series on the Hallmark Movies & Mysteries channel. After several actors left the Hallmark Channel in 2022 to go to the new Great American Family network, Chabert voiced her allegiance to Hallmark, and signed a new contract allowing her to take on a larger role with the network, including producing some of her own movies. Chabert portrayed marketing executive Josie Wilder in the network's romantic drama Sweet Carolina in 2021, in which Josie returns home and suddenly becomes her niece and nephew's guardian. Chabert was credited as an executive producer and also contributed to the film's story with Jonathan Prince and Michael Reisz. In February 2022, Chabert signed an exclusive multi-film deal with Hallmark Channel's parent company, Crown Media Family Networks. She co-starred with Kevin McGarry in the popular‘‘The Wedding Veil’’ series.

In November 2023, Chabert starred in a Mean Girls-themed Black Friday commercial for Walmart, along with her original co-stars Lindsay Lohan, Amanda Seyfried, Rajiv Surendra and Daniel Franzese. A second commercial, titled "Gretchen's Wednesday", was entirely centered around Chabert's character Gretchen Wieners and her family life. On November 27, 2023, it was announced that Chabert was working on an unscripted Hallmark project, Celebrations with Lacey Chabert, which premiered on Hallmark+ on September 10, 2024. She was also credited as an executive producer of the series. On May 13, 2024, Variety announced that Chabert has a lead role in the Netflix holiday film Hot Frosty. Chabert starred as a widow who brings a snowman to life two years after losing her husband. Released on November 13, 2024, Hot Frosty was placed at number one on Netflix in its first week after release.

In 2025, Chabert starred in the Hallmark movie She's Making a List as Isabel who works for the Naughty or Nice Group.

In 2026, Chabert starred in the Hallmark movie Lost in Paradise as a fashion company founder named Sophia, who is marooned on an island with a struggling chef (portrayed by Ian Harding) following a private airplane crash. She would later star in the Hallmark/Disney collaboration movie Holiday Ever After: A Disney World Wish Come True alongside Travis Van Winkle, Christy Carlson Romano, and Richard Kind.

== Business ventures ==
In 2016, she wrote a blog series for People magazine's website, focusing on getting ready for her baby. Chabert wrote about discovering that she was pregnant, learning that she was having a girl, and figuring out smart ways to hide her baby bump on film sets.

In September 2022, Chabert launched her own apparel line with home shopping television network HSN called the "Lacey Chabert Collection". In an interview with InStyle, Chabert said: "I've always dreamed of having a clothing line." Her first ready-to-wear collection for HSN was released in March 2024.

Chabert launched a product line, "Lacey Chabert Collection" with Hallmark for the 2025 holiday season. It consists of various products, including greeting cards, glassware, ornaments, and festive products.

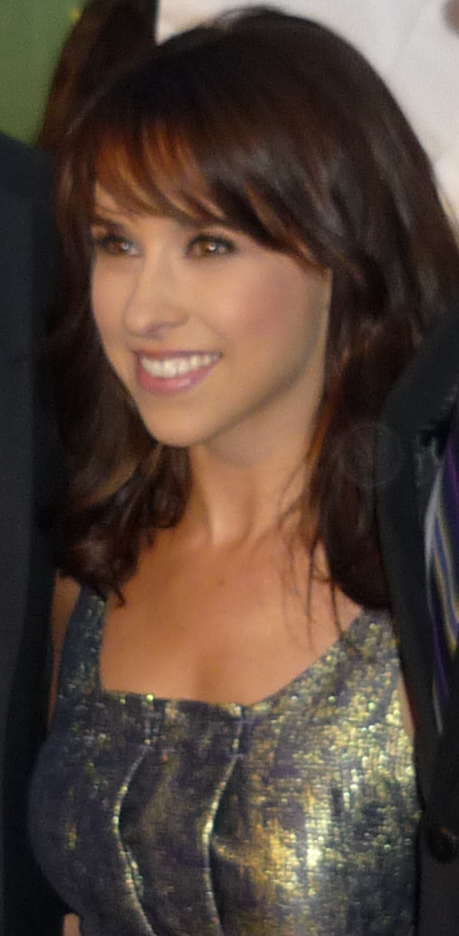
Chabert at the film premiere of In My Sleep in 2010.

== In popular culture ==
Appearing in more than 40 Hallmark Channel films, many of them holiday-themed, Chabert has been referred to as the 'Queen of Hallmark Christmas Movies'. Chabert stated in an E! interview that, "one of the things I love about [working with Hallmark] is you're guaranteed a happy ending [...] I think in the world we're living in today, to be a part of a project that adds a little love and light and levity into the world is something I'm very proud of."

Chabert has been featured on numerous magazine covers, such as Stuff, People, Entertainment Weekly, TV Guide and Maxim. She was on the cover of Maxim at age 31, and said, "I got the call from Maxim and then immediately put down the cupcake and ran to the gym."

== Personal life ==
Chabert married her longtime boyfriend, David Nehdar, on December 22, 2013, in Los Angeles. She gave birth to their daughter in September 2016.

== Filmography ==
=== Film ===
Year	Title	Role	Notes
1997	Journey Beneath the Sea	Merla (voice)	Direct to video
1997	Redux Riding Hood	Little Red Riding Hood (voice)	Direct to video
1997	Babes in Toyland	Jill (voice)	Direct to video
1997	Anastasia	Young Anastasia (singing voice)	
1998	Lost in Space	Penny Robinson	
1998	The Lion King II: Simba's Pride	Young Vitani (voice)	Direct to video
1998	An American Tail: The Treasure of Manhattan Island	Tanya Mousekewitz (voice)	
1999	An American Tail: The Mystery of the Night Monster	Tanya Mousekewitz (voice)	
1999	We Wish You a Merry Christmas	Cindy (voice)	
2001	Tart	Eloise Logan	
2001	Not Another Teen Movie	Amanda Becker	
2002	Hometown Legend	Rachel Sawyer	
2002	Balto II: Wolf Quest	Aleu (voice)	Direct to video
2002	Snow Dogs	Little Aleutia (voice)	
2002	The Scoundrel's Wife	Florida Picou	
2002	The Wild Thornberrys Movie	Eliza Thornberry (voice)	
2003	Daddy Day Care	Jennifer "Jenny"	
2003	Rugrats Go Wild	Eliza Thornberry (voice)	
2004	On Tracy Lane: Back to Maybe	Leading Lady	Short
2004	Mean Girls	Gretchen Wieners	
2004	Shadow of Fear	Allison Henderson	
2005	Dirty Deeds	Meg Cummings	
2005	Bratz Rock Angelz	Kaycee (voice)	
2006	High Hopes	Cindy	
2006	Fatwa	Noa Goldman	
2006	A New Wave	Julie	
2006	Bratz: Genie Magic	Kaycee (voice)	Direct to video
2006	The Pleasure Drivers	Faruza	
2006	Choose Your Own Adventure: The Abominable Snowman	Crista North (voice)	Direct to video
2006	Bratz: Passion 4 Fashion – Diamondz	Kaycee (voice)	Direct to video
2006	Black Christmas	Dana Mathis	
2007	Be My Baby	Tiffany	
2007	Being Michael Madsen	Vanessa Rapaport	
2008	Sherman's Way	Marcy	
2008	Reach for Me	Sarah	
2009	Ghosts of Girlfriends Past	Sandra	
2010	In My Sleep	Becky	
2010	Thirst	Noelle Edwards	Also executive producer
2010	Quantum Quest: A Cassini Space Odyssey	Jeanna (voice)	
2011	Destruction Party	Ava	Short
2011	A Holiday Heist	Jennifer	
2012	Beverly Hills Chihuahua 3: Viva La Fiesta!	Charlotte (voice)	Direct to video
2013	Sanitarium	Ms. Lorne	
2013	Slightly Single in L.A.	Dale Squire	
2013	Scooby-Doo! Mecha Mutt Menace	Melanie Staples (voice)	Direct to video
2013	Anything Is Possible	Maggie	
2013	Off Season: Lex Morrison Story	Sally Summers	
2014	Telling of the Shoes	Abby	
2014	Ghost of Goodnight Lane	Dani	
2014	Christian Mingle	Gwyneth Hayden	
2016	Ginger & Snapper	Ginger	Short
2016	The Lost Tree	Jenna Lynds	
2017	All I Want for Christmas Is You	Penelope (voice)	Direct to video
2018	Do You	Jane	Short
2024	Hot Frosty	Kathy Barrett	Netflix original film

=== Television ===
Year	Title	Role	Notes
1991	A Little Piece of Heaven	Princess aka "Hazel"	Television film
1991	Reading Rainbow	Herself	Episode: "Snowy Day: Stories and Poems"
1992–1993	All My Children	Bianca Montgomery	10 episodes
1993	Gypsy	Baby June	Television film
1994–2000	Party of Five	Claudia Salinger	Series regular; 142 episodes
1996	ABC Afterschool Specials	Carly Gallagher	Episode: "Educating Mom"
1996	Gargoyles	Kim, Bobbi Porter	Voice, 2 episodes
1996	Aaahh!!! Real Monsters	Girl (5), Kids (2), Girl (6) Additional voices	Voice, 3 episodes
1997	Adventures from the Book of Virtues	The Younger Daughter	Voice, episode: "Respect"
1997	When Secrets Kill	Jenny Newhall	Television film
1997	Hey Arnold!	Ruth P. McDougal	Voice, 2 episodes
1997	Nightmare Ned	Little Girl	Voice, episode: "Magic Bus"
1998	Stories from My Childhood	Jenny	Episode: "The Last Petal"
1998	Hercules	Callista	Voice, episode: "Hercules and the Kids"
1998–2004	The Wild Thornberrys	Eliza Thornberry, additional voices	Voice, main role
1999–2000, 2011–2012, 2018	Family Guy	Meg Griffin, Jan Brady	Voice, 15 episodes; uncredited
2001	The Wild Thornberrys: The Origin of Donnie	Eliza Thornberry	Voice, television film
2002	The Proud Family	Additional voices	Episode: "Romeo Must Wed"
2002	Strong Medicine	Mary	Episode: "Heartbeat"
2002	The Drew Carey Show	Grace	Episode: "Drew's Girl Friday"
2003	Stuart Little	Katy	Voice, episode: "Skateboard Dogz"
2003	Punk'd	Herself	Episode: "#1.4"
2004	The Brooke Ellison Story	Brooke Ellison	Television film
2005	American Dragon: Jake Long	Jasmine	Voice, episode: "Dragon Breath"
2005	Super Robot Monkey Team Hyperforce Go!	Certhana	Voice, episode: "Girl Trouble"
2005–2006	Bratz	Kaycee	Voice, 17 episodes
2006	She Said/He Said	Unknown role	Television film
2006	Hello Sister, Goodbye Life	Olivia	Television film
2006	Ghost Whisperer	Donna Ellis	Episode: "Love Still Won't Die"
2007	Eloise: The Animated Series	Ida	Voice, episode: "Eloise Goes Hollywood (Part 1)"
2007	What If God Were the Sun?	Jamie Spagnoletti	Television film
2008	Untitled Liz Meriwether Project	Liz Meriwether	Television film
2008–2009	The Spectacular Spider-Man	Gwen Stacy	Voice, main role
2009	The Lost	Jane	Television film
2009	Glenn Martin, DDS	Amish Girls	Voice, episode: "Amish Anguish"
2010	Elevator Girl	Liberty Taylor	Hallmark Channel Television movie
2011	Mike DA Mustang	Angel	Television film
2011	Allen Gregory	Beth	Voice, 6 episodes
2011–2012	Generator Rex	Jojo	Voice, 2 episodes
2011–2016	Transformers: Rescue Bots	Dani Burns, additional voices	Voice, main role
2011–2013, 2019–2022	Young Justice	Zatanna Zatara / Doctor Fate	Voice, 18 episodes
2012	Doc McStuffins	Gabby the Giraffe, Little Girl	Voice, episode: "Arcade Escapade"
2012	Imaginary Friend	Emma	Television film
2012	The Avengers: Earth's Mightiest Heroes	Daisy Johnson / Quake	Voice, 2 episodes
2012	Matchmaker Santa	Melanie	Hallmark Channel Television Movie
2013	Off Season: Lex Morrison Story	Sally Summers	Television film
2013	Scarecrow	Kristen Miller	Television film
2013	Non-Stop	Amy Nightingale	Television film
2013–2014	Baby Daddy	Dr. Amy Shaw	Recurring role; 6 episodes
2013, 2015	Robot Chicken	Eliza Thornberry, Carly Shay, Mother Bird	Voice, 2 episodes
2014	The Color of Rain	Gina Kell	Hallmark Channel Television Movie
2014	A Royal Christmas	Emily Taylor	Hallmark Channel Television Movie
2014	The Tree That Saved Christmas	Molly Logan	Television film
2014	Living the Dream	Jenna Harris	Television film
2014	Ridiculousness	Herself	Ssn4, Ep15
2015	All of My Heart	Jenny Fintley	Hallmark Channel Television Movies
2015	Family for Christmas	Hanna Dunbar	Hallmark Channel Television Movies
2015	A Christmas Melody	Kristin Parson	Hallmark Channel Television Movies
2015	Family Fortune	Nichole	Television film
2016	Teachers	Ginny	Episode: "Jacob"
2016	Still the King	Laura Beth	Recurring role; 4 episodes
2016	Kulipari	Coorah, Thuma	Series regular; 13 episodes Voice role
2016	A Wish for Christmas	Sara Thomas	Hallmark Channel Television Movie; also as co-executive producer
2016–2017	Justice League Action	Zatanna Zatara, Keely Miller	Voice, 7 episodes
2016–2018	Voltron: Legendary Defender	Nyma, Romelle, Te-osh	Voice, 4 episodes
2016, 2019	The Lion Guard	Vitani	Voice, 2 episodes
2016–2020	Shimmer and Shine	Zeta	Voice, 22 episodes
2017	Moonlight in Vermont	Fiona Rangley	Hallmark Channel Television Movies
2017	All of My Heart: Inn Love	Jenny Fintley	Hallmark Channel Television Movies
2017	The Sweetest Christmas	Kylie Watson	Hallmark Channel Television Movies
2018	My Secret Valentine	Chloe Grange	Hallmark Channel Television Movies
2018	Love on Safari	Kira Slater	Hallmark Channel Television Movies
2018	All of My Heart: The Wedding	Jenny Fintley	Hallmark Channel Television Movies
2018	Pride, Prejudice and Mistletoe	Darcy Fitzwilliam	Hallmark Channel Television Movies
2019	Love, Romance & Chocolate	Emma Colvin	Hallmark Channel Television Movies
2019	The Crossword Mysteries: A Puzzle to Die For	Tess Harper	Hallmark Movies & Mysteries Television Movies
2019	The Crossword Mysteries: Proposing Murder	Tess Harper	Hallmark Movies & Mysteries Television Movies
2019	Christmas in Rome	Angela de Luca	Hallmark Channel Television Movies
2019	Kung Fu Panda: The Paws of Destiny	Panda Mother, Xiao	Voice, 10 episodes
2020	Winter in Vail	Chelsea Whitmore	Hallmark Channel Television Movies
2020	The Crossword Mysteries: Abracadaver	Tess Harper	Hallmark Movies & Mysteries Television Movie
2020	Christmas Waltz	Avery	Hallmark Channel Television Movie
2020	Time for Us to Come Home for Christmas	Sarah Thomas	Hallmark Movies & Mysteries Television Movie
2021	The Crossword Mysteries: Terminal Descent	Tess Harper	Hallmark Movies & Mysteries Television Movies
2021	Crossword Mysteries: Riddle Me Dead	Tess Harper	Hallmark Movies & Mysteries Television Movies
2021	Sweet Carolina	Josie Wilder	Hallmark Channel Television Movies
2021	Christmas at Castle Hart	Brooke Bennett	Hallmark Channel Television Movies
2021	Harriet the Spy	Marion Hawthorne	Voice
2022	The Wedding Veil	Avery Morrison	Hallmark Channel Television Movies; also as executive producer
2022	The Wedding Veil Unveiled	Avery Hastings	Hallmark Channel Television Movies; also as executive producer
2022	The Wedding Veil Legacy	Avery Hastings	Hallmark Channel Television Movies; also as executive producer
2022	Groundswell	Emma	Hallmark Movies & Mysteries Television Movie; also as executive producer
2022	Haul Out the Holly	Emily	Hallmark Channel Television Movies; also as executive producer
2023	The Wedding Veil Expectations	Avery Hastings	Hallmark Channel Television Movies; also as executive producer
2023	The Wedding Veil Inspiration	Avery Hastings	Hallmark Channel Television Movies; also as executive producer
2023	The Wedding Veil Journey	Avery Hastings	Hallmark Channel Television Movies; also as executive producer
2023	The Dancing Detective: A Deadly Tango	Detective Constance Bailey	Hallmark Movies & Mysteries Television Movie; also as executive producer
2023	Harley Quinn	Supergirl / Kara Zor-El	Voice, episode: "Getting Ice Dick, Don't Wait Up"
2023	A Merry Scottish Christmas	Dr. Lindsay Morgan	Hallmark Channel Television Movie; also as executive producer
2023	Haul out the Holly: Lit Up	Emily	Hallmark Channel Television Movie; also as executive producer
2024	Kite Man: Hell Yeah!	Ava / Kennneth's Mom	Voice, episode: "Grand Reopening, Hell Yeah!"
2024	Batman: Caped Crusader	Yvonne Frances	Voice, episode: "...And Be a Villain"
2024	His & Hers	Dana	Hallmark Channel Television Movie; also as an executive producer
2024	Celebrations with Lacey Chabert	Host	10 episodes; also as executive producer
2024	The Christmas Quest	Stefanie Baxter	Hallmark Channel Television Movie; also as an executive producer
2025	An Unexpected Valentine	Hannah	Hallmark Channel Television Movie
2025	Haul Out the Halloween	Emily	Hallmark Channel Television Movie
2025	She's Making a List	Isabel	Hallmark Channel Television Movie
2026	Lost in Paradise	Sophia	Hallmark Channel Television Movie
2026	Paris is Always a Good Idea	Chelsea	Hallmark Channel Television Series
2026	Holiday Come True: A Disney World Wish Come True	Lindsey	Upcoming Hallmark Channel Television Film

=== Video games ===
Year	Title	Voice role	Notes
2000	The Wild Thornberrys: Rambler	Eliza Thornberry	
2001	Nicktoons Racing	Eliza Thornberry	
2001	Nicktoons Nick Tunes	Eliza Thornberry	
2002	Nickelodeon Party Blast	Eliza Thornberry	
2002	The Wild Thornberrys Movie	Eliza Thornberry	
2003	Rugrats Go Wild	Eliza Thornberry	
2005	Bratz: Rock Angelz	Kaycee	
2006	Sonic the Hedgehog	Princess Elise the Third	English dub
2011	Star Wars: The Old Republic	Mako	
2013	Star Wars: The Old Republic – Rise of the Hutt Cartel	Mako	
2013	Injustice: Gods Among Us	Zatanna Zatara	Uncredited
2013	Young Justice: Legacy	Zatanna Zatara	
2014	Star Wars: The Old Republic – Shadow of Revan	Mako	
2015	Infinite Crisis	Zatanna Zatara	
2015	Star Wars: The Old Republic – Knights of the Fallen Empire	Mako	
2022	Nickelodeon Extreme Tennis	Eliza Thornberry	

=== Theatre ===
Year	Title	Role	Venue
1992–1993	Les Misérables	Young Cosette	Broadway

=== Home media ===
Year	Title	Role	Notes
1990	Child World/Children's Palace - Video Toy Chest	Herself	
1993	Richard Scarry's Best Busy People Video Ever!	Unknown	Voice role
1993	Richard Scarry's Best Learning Songs Video Ever!	Unknown	Voice role
1994	Richard Scarry's Best Silly Stories and Songs Video Ever!	Unknown	Voice role
1994	Richard Scarry's Best Sing-Along Mother Goose Video Ever!	Unknown	Voice role

=== Commercials ===
Year	Title	Brand	Role
2023	Walmart Black Friday Deals: Jingle Bell Rockin'	Walmart	Gretchen Wieners
2023	Walmart Black Friday Deals: Gretchen’s Wednesday	Walmart	Gretchen Wieners
2023	Walmart Black Friday Deals: Karen's Wednesday	Walmart	Gretchen Wieners
2025	Philosophy: It Was Always You	Philosophy	Claire

== Discography ==
=== The Broadway Kids albums ===
- The Broadway Kids Sing Broadway (1994)

=== Songs ===
List of songs performed by Lacey Chabert
Year	Title	Album	Notes
1993	"May We Entertain You"	Gypsy	Performed by Lacey Chabert and Elisabeth Moss
1997	"Prologue"	Anastasia	Performed by Lacey Chabert and Angela Lansbury

== Awards and nominations ==
Year	Title	Accolade	Results
1993	A Little Piece of Heaven	Young Artist Award, Best Young Actress Under 10 in a Television Movie	Nominated
1995	Party of Five	Young Artist Award, Best Performance by a Youth Actress in a Drama Series	Nominated
1996	Party of Five	Young Artist Award, Best Performance by a Young Actress in a Television Drama Series	Nominated
1997	Party of Five	Online Film & Television Association award, Best Supporting Actress in a Drama Series	Nominated
1997	Party of Five	Online Film & Television Association award, Best Ensemble in a Series	Nominated
1997	Party of Five	Online Film & Television Association award, Best Ensemble in a Drama Series	Nominated
1997	Party of Five	Young Artist Award, Best Performance in a Drama Series – Young Actress	Nominated
1997	Party of Five	YoungStar Award, Best Performance by a Young Actress in a Drama Television Series	Won
1998	Lost in Space	The Stinkers Bad Movie award, Worst Supporting Actress	Won
1998	Party of Five	YoungStar Award, Best Performance by a Young Actress in a Drama Television Series	Won
1999	Lost in Space	Young Artist Award, Best Performance in a Feature Film – Supporting Young Actress	Nominated
1999	Party of Five	Young Artist Award, Best Performance in a Television Drama or Comedy Series – Leading Young Actress	Won
1999	Party of Five	YoungStar Award, Best Performance by a Young Actress in a Drama Television Series	Nominated
2000	Party of Five	YoungStar Award, Best Performance by a Young Actress in a Drama Television Series	Nominated
2000	The Wild Thornberrys	YoungStar Award, Best Young Voice Over Talent	Nominated
2005	Mean Girls	MTV Movie + TV award, Best On-Screen Team (shared with Lindsay Lohan, Rachel McAdams, Amanda Seyfried)	Won
2012	Young Justice	Online Film & Television Association award, Best Voice-Over Performance	Nominated
2013	Young Justice	Behind the Voice Actors award, Best Female Vocal Performance in a Television Series in a Supporting Role – Action/Drama	Nominated
2013	Transformers: Rescue Bots	Behind the Voice Actors award, Best Vocal Ensemble in a New Television Series	Nominated
2015	Transformers: Rescue Bots	Behind the Voice Actors award, Best Vocal Ensemble in a Television Series – Children/s/Educational	Nominated
2017	Kulipari: An Army of Frogs	Behind the Voice Actors award, Best Female Lead Vocal Performance in a Television Series	Nominated
2017	Kulipari: An Army of Frogs	Behind the Voice Actors award, Best Vocal Ensemble in a New Television Series	Nominated
2017	The Lost Tree	Independent Filmmakers Showcase IFS Film Festival award, Best Supporting Actress	Won
2022	–	Just Jared Awards, Favorite Hallmark Channel Star of 2022	Nominated

== Authored articles ==
- Chabert, Lacey (October 26, 2020). "Lacey Chabert: Christmas Is Close to My Heart". Guideposts.
