= Winter in Vail =

2020 American television romance film

- Poster
- Genre: Romance
- Written by: Delondra Mesa; Duane Poole
- Directed by: Terry Ingram
- Starring: Lacey Chabert; Tyler Hynes
- Music by: Mikel Hurwitz
- Country of origin: United States
- Original language: English language

Production
- Producers: Kyle Cooper; Scott J. Jones; Jason Wan Lim
- Production locations: Alberta; Vail, Colorado
- Cinematography: Neil Cervin
- Editor: Ana Florit
- Running time: 83 minutes

Original release
- Network: Hallmark Channel
- Release: January 4, 2020

Winter in Vail is a 2020 American made-for-television romance film directed by Terry Ingram, starring Lacey Chabert and Tyler Hynes.

The film is a Hallmark Channel original movie, first in Hallmark's 2020 Winterfest film series, preceding Love in Winterland, Love on Iceland, Amazing Winter Romance, and Hearts of Winter. It premiered on January 4, 2020.

== Plot ==
Chelsea Whitmore (Lacey Chabert) is a Los Angeles-based event planner who, after missing out yet again on an anticipated Vice President promotion, decides to quit her job and move to Vail, Colorado. Here, she recently inherited the chalet of her late uncle Grady, who until his death was a well-respected pastry chef famous for his apple strudel recipe. Chelsea was once very close with him, but lost contact after her career took off. She decides to stay in town temporarily while finding her next career step.

Chelsea soon finds out that the chalet needs urgent repair and hires the local contractor Owen Becker (Tyler Hynes) to help her. While he is busy remodeling the house, she gradually falls in love with the beauty of the small town; a historic alpine village that is celebrated by visitors for its Bavarian heritage. She becomes friends with Karl Becker (Grew Lawson), Owen’s father and the owner of a Bavarian restaurant. Back in the day, the restaurant was frequently visited due to Grady’s apple strudel on the menu. After his death, Karl no longer can offer customers the signature dish, and now struggles to compete against new restaurant chains run by non-locals and celebrity chefs.

While repairing the house, Chelsea grows closer to Owen, and learns that he once had a promising architecture career ahead of him, but ultimately decided to stay in the small town to help his father’s business. He takes her exploring in the many scenic spots of town, and teaches her the importance of small-town values. One day, she finds the recipe of her uncle’s apple strudel and is successful in recreating the signature dish. Now that the apple strudel can be offered in the restaurant again, she decided to create buzz by organizing the so-called Strudelfest.

Karl and Owen are impressed by her event planning skills, and the organization runs smoothly. However, one day her former colleague Vienna North (Marla Renae) suddenly shows up on her doorstep to, on behalf of her boss Trish Simmons (Constance Marie), offer her the Vice President position. Even though by now she is well-integrated within Vail with her next event planning gig in town already lined up, she accepts the offer, reasoning that this offer is what she worked towards for years. Back in Los Angeles, however, she soon realizes how much she misses both Vail and Owen and ultimately returns to Vail, where she finally becomes romantically involved with Owen.

== Cast ==
- Lacey Chabert as Chelsea Whitmore
- Tyler Hynes as Owen Becker
- Marla Renae as Vienna North
- Greg Lawson as Karl Becker
- Constance Marie as Trish Simmons
- Karen Barker as Bev Hankins
- Sage Kitchen as Molly
- Chris W. Cook as Rob
- Liana Shannon as Chef Laura
- Chantelle Han as Chef Frankie

== Production ==
The film was shot between mid-November and early December 2019. Even though a few scenes were shot on location in Vail, Colorado, the majority of filming took place in the Canadian province Alberta, with shooting locations including Calgary, Banff National Park, Bragg Creek, Mt Norquay, and Priddis.
