= Christmas in Rockwell =

American-Canadian film

- Directed by: Amy Force
- Written by: Luciano Casimiri
- Starring: Trish Stratus; Stephen Huszar; Sheila McCarthy
- Release date: December 11, 2022
- Running time: 86 minutes
- Countries: Canada; United States
- Language: English

Christmas in Rockwell is an American-Canadian holiday film, released in 2022. It stars Trish Stratus as Alyssa who returns to her hometown for the holidays.

It was added to Fox Nation on December 11, 2022.

== Plot ==
Alyssa, played by Trish Stratus, decides to escape Hollywood for the holiday season to try and return to some normality. She returns to her hometown of Rockwell without revealing her identity. The former child actor hadn't been back to her hometown in 25 years.

On her return she meets Jake, the owner of a local cinema. They instantly connect, but Alyssa becomes unsure if she can continue to maintain a low profile for the worry that the paparazzi will track her down.

== Main cast ==
- Trish Stratus as Alyssa
- Stephen Huszar as Jake
- Sheila McCarthy as Juniper
- Roy Lewis as Morty
- Sherry Miller as Jenny
- Seamus Patterson as Mike
- Kara Duncan as Erin

== Reception ==
The Dove Foundation approved the film for all ages.

== Release ==
Following its release in November 2022, Christmas in Rockwell remained in Amazon's top 10 romance films list until the end of 2022. It was then released on Fox Nation in the second weekend of December 2022. It has since become available on other streaming platforms such as Apple TV and Roku.
