= Hot Frosty =

2024 Christmas film

- Release poster
- Directed by: Jerry Ciccoritti
- Written by: Russell Hainline
- Produced by: Joel S. Rice; Michael Barbuto
- Starring: Lacey Chabert; Dustin Milligan; Sherry Miller; Katy Mixon Greer; Lauren Holly; Chrishell Stause; Joe Lo Truglio; Craig Robinson
- Cinematography: Éric Cayla
- Edited by: Julia Blua
- Music by: Ari Posner
- Production company: Muse Entertainment
- Distributed by: Netflix
- Release date: November 13, 2024
- Running time: 92 minutes
- Country: United States
- Language: English

Hot Frosty is a 2024 American Christmas romantic comedy film directed by Jerry Ciccoritti, written by Russell Hainline, and starring Lacey Chabert, Dustin Milligan, Sherry Miller, Katy Mixon Greer, Lauren Holly, Chrishell Stause, Joe Lo Truglio, and Craig Robinson. Chabert plays Kathy, a widow who counters her loneliness with a magical snowman brought to life (portrayed by Milligan).

The film was released on Netflix on November 13, 2024.

== Plot ==
Kathy Barrett runs Kathryn’s Kafé in downtown Hope Springs, New York. After the death of her handyman husband from cancer, she finds herself unmotivated to take care of her house. Kathy lives with no heating, a leaking roof, and a broken step on her staircase. However, she takes care of everyone else in town.

Kathy takes lunch to her friends, Theo and Mel, at their second-hand clothing shop, Reclaimed Rags. Mel comforts Kathy about her difficulties and then tells her a story about how she met Theo years ago and how it was meant to be which prompts Mel to give her a red scarf "destined" for her, encouraging her to be open to good things that might come her way. On her way home, Kathy passes by the town's snow sculpture competition, places the scarf on a muscular snowman and takes a picture.

Later that night, the snowman comes to life. As he runs naked from an elderly couple and their dogs, he accidentally falls through a second-hand clothing shop window. He grabs overalls and galoshes from the shop to wear. In the morning, Kathy finds him talking to the other snowmen and invites him into her diner for a bite to eat.

Kathy assumes the "Jack" name tag on the overalls is the newly human snowman's name, and asks what his first memory is. He replies it is of her placing the scarf on him, then the camera flash. The sheriff investigates the perceived clothing shop break-in and vows to find the perpetrator.

Jack is freezing to the touch, so Kathy takes him to her doctor friend Dolly, who confirms Jack's body temperature to be below freezing. Kathy takes him home. When she arrives home that evening, Jack surprises her with homemade pizza, which he learned to make while watching a cooking show. She is uncomfortable with Jack's constant hugs and expressions of love for her.

As Jack is fixing the roof, Kathy's neighbor drives into a snowbank, distracted at the sight of the shirtless man. He pushes her car out and she asks him to do some handywork in her house. She invites her friends over to watch.

One of the women asks Jack to aid her son, a short-staffed middle school principal, to prepare for a holiday dance, and he gives Jack a job as the school's maintenance staff. They bring him to Kathy's diner, where he and Kathy are approached by the sheriff. She reminds Jack that he needs to be more discreet. However, she is touched by his repair works around her house.

Jack helps decorate the school hall, and overhears a student invite another to the dance. Inspired, Jack invites Kathy to be his date. She accepts and takes him suit shopping. Jack gives Kathy a silver snowflake necklace. At the dance, Kathy sees Jack is overheating and takes him outside to cool down. They almost kiss, but Jack fears Kathy might be hurt when he melts away.

On Christmas Eve, the town gathers at the diner. Kathy's speech is interrupted when the sheriff arrests Jack, to everyone's disapproval. The doctor explains that Jack is a snowman, and everyone agrees that Christmas is a time for such magic. Sheriff Nate demands a $2,000 bail for Jack's release.

Kathy empties the diner's safe and everyone from the diner donates, but it still falls short. The sheriff's son offers to contribute the remaining amount, so Nate relents and returns the bail money. Kathy takes Jack outside, but he no longer moves. Assuming he is dead, she kisses him, takes the red scarf and starts to leave. Jack comes back to life, shivering and functioning like a real human. They finally kiss.

Continuing to live together, Kathy and Jack exchange presents. He gives her a home repair book and Kathy gets them plane tickets to Hawaii. After she fixes the heat, they head off there together.

== Cast ==
- Lacey Chabert as Kathy Barrett
- Dustin Milligan as Jack Snowman
- Craig Robinson as Sheriff Nathaniel Hunter
- Joe Lo Truglio as Deputy Sheriff Ed Schatz
- Katy Mixon Greer as Dottie
- Lauren Holly as Jane Miller
- Chrishell Stause as Jan
- Sherry Miller as Mel
- Dan Lett as Theo
- Allan Royal as Mortimer

== Production ==
The film is directed by Jerry Ciccoritti and written by Russell Hainline. Joel S. Rice and Michael Barbuto produced for Muse Entertainment. Filming took place in Canada in April and May 2024, with filming locations including Ottawa, Brockville and Pakenham, Ontario.

== Release ==
The film was released on Netflix on November 13, 2024.

== Reception ==
On the review aggregator website Rotten Tomatoes, 76% of 37 critics' reviews are positive, with an average rating of 5.6/10. The website's consensus reads: "Knowingly goofy with its steamy twist on the magic of Christmas, Hot Frosty is an affable rom-com that ought to thaw the hearts of even the most skeptical of viewers." Metacritic, which uses a weighted average, assigned the film a score of 50 out of 100, based on 11 critics, indicating "mixed or average" reviews.
