= Sherry Miller =

Canadian actress

- Born: Alberta, Canada
- Occupations: Actress, news anchor
- Years active: 1971–present
- Known for: E.N.G.; Polka Dot Door; Queer as Folk; Lucky Girl; Hot Frosty (2024 film)

Sherry Miller is a Canadian actress best known for her role as Jane on the CTV drama E.N.G. (1990), as Jennifer Taylor on the Showtime drama Queer As Folk (2000–2005), and as Dorothy O'Sullivan on the Global teen drama The Best Years (2007–2009) as well as her appearance in Netflix's Hot Frosty (2024).

== Biography ==
Miller began her career in the 1970s as a singer and dancer. She later gained attention in Canadian television for representing Spumante Bambino wine in commercial advertisements, as well as for her role as the host of the children's television series, Polka Dot Door. She also appeared in Sofia Coppola's The Virgin Suicides. She won a 2001 Gemini Award for Best Performance by an Actress in a Featured Supporting Role in a Dramatic Program or Mini-Series for her work as Elisha Cuthbert's mother in Lucky Girl.

Miller is best known for her recurring role as Justin's mother Jennifer Taylor on the American version of Queer As Folk, during the entire run of the series from 2000 to 2005. She also appeared on the television series E.N.G. as weather reporter/anchor person Jane Oliver, and the 2004 miniseries Kingdom Hospital as sleep psychologist Dr. Lona Massingale.

Miller was also an anchor for Global Television's newscasts from 1986 to 1988.

== Awards ==
Miller has been nominated for four Gemini awards, one of which she won. In both 1990 and 1992, Miller was nominated for Best Performance by a Supporting Actress for her role as Jane Oliver on the television show E.N.G. In 2001, Miller won a Gemini for her performance in Lucky Girl in the category of Best Performance by an Actress in a Featured Supporting Role in a Dramatic Program or Mini-Series. In 2002, Miller received another Gemini nomination in the same category, for her role as Lisa Gallagher in A Killing Spring.

== Filmography ==
- 1981 Utilities as Celebrity
- 1986 Separate Vacations as Sandy
- 1994 Thicker Than Blood: The Larry McLinden Story as Linda
- 1995 Rent-a-Kid as Valerie Syracuse
- 1995 Johnny Mnemonic as Takahashi's Secretary
- 1996 Shadow Zone: The Undead Express as Mom
- 1996 The Care and Handling of Rose as Brooke
- 1996 The Stupids as Anchorwoman
- 1996 Hostile Advances: The Kerry Ellison Story as Jean
- 1996 Sabrina The Teenage Witch as Aunt Hilda
- 1997 La Femme Nikita as Helen Wick
- 1998 Scandalous Me: The Jacqueline Susann Story as Bea Cole
- 1998 Dead Husbands as Nicole Allison
- 1998 This Matter of Marriage as Donnalee
- 1999 Strange Justice as Susan Deller Ross
- 1999 The Virgin Suicides as Mrs. Buell
- 1999-2005 Queer as Folk as Jennifer Taylor
- 2000 Tribulation as Suzie Canboro
- 2000 Harry's Case
- 2001 Murder Among Friends as Marsha Woodruff
- 2001 Tart as Jane Logan
- 2001 Lucky Girl as Valerie Palmerston
- 2001 Laughter on the 23rd Floor as Faye
- 2002 Crossing the Line as Jennifer Blackstone
- 2002 Too Young to Be a Dad as Juliana Howell
- 2002 A Killing Spring as Lisa Gallagher
- 2003 This Time Around as Mary Ann McNally
- 2006 It's a Boy Girl Thing as Katherine Bedworth
- 2008 Ice Blues as Joan Lenigan
- 2014 I'll Follow You Down as Mrs. Moore
- 2016 Love's Complicated as Mrs. Townsend
- 2021 ‘’Five More Minutes’’ as Bonnie Bingham
- 2022 Christmas in Rockwell as Jenny
- 2024 Hot Frosty as Mel

== Television ==
- Polka Dot Door (1971) - as Host
- E.N.G. (1990) as Jane Oliver
- Scales of Justice (1992) - Episode "Regina v Pappajohn"
- Highlander: The Series (1994) - as Sarah Carter in the Season 3 episode, "Obsession"
- Due South (1995–1996) as Commander Sherry O'Neil (3 episodes)
- F/X: The Series (1996–1997) - as Colleen O'Malley
- Relic Hunter (1999) - as Sister Mary (1 episode)
- Queer as Folk (2000–2005) - as Jennifer Taylor
- Tom Stone (2002–2004) - as Inspector Alexandra Black
- Stephen King's Kingdom Hospital (2004) - as Dr. Lona Massingale
- The Dresden Files (2007–2008)- Season 1 as Monica Cutler / Mrs. Cutler
- The Best Years (2007–2009) - as Dorothy O'Sullivan
- jPod (2008) - Season 1 as Carol Jarlewski
- Warehouse 13 (2009) - Episode 1 'Pilot' as Lorna Soliday
- The Listener (2009) - as Mrs Wallace (guest star S01ep11)
- Bitten (2014) - Season 1 (4 episodes) as Olivia McAdams
- Open Heart (2015) - Season 1 as Helena Blake
- Carter (2018)
- Schitt's Creek - (2 episodes) - Season 2 "Happy Anniversary" and Season 4 "Merry Christmas, Johnny Rose"
- Ginny & Georgia (2023–2025) - as Patricia Randolph
