= Dreams Take Flight =

The Dreams Take Flight programme was created by a group of Air Canada employees to give a trip of a lifetime to Disney World or Disneyland for a day for children who have experienced medical, mental, physical, social or emotional challenges. It has been in operation since 1989 and has eight chapters across Canada, including Vancouver, Calgary, Edmonton, Winnipeg, Toronto, Ottawa, Montreal and Halifax. Each chapter sends a full flight every year to either Disney World (eastern chapters, including Winnipeg) or to Disneyland (Vancouver, Calgary and Edmonton).

Dreams Take Flight is 100% volunteer-driven. Air Canada donates an entire aircraft to each chapter for a day, and volunteers fundraise throughout the year to pay for the rest. Chapters work with various medical organizations, social agencies and school districts, to select the children for the flight.

Since its inception, Dreams Take Flight has enabled over 20,000 dreams for children from Canada and Northern United States to the Magic Kingdom in Orlando, Florida.

The programme organizes the combined efforts of numerous service clubs, sports and entertainment figures, organizations and sponsors to provide a unique experience for children that may otherwise have never had such an opportunity.

== Media Coverage (Toronto Chapter) ==
- 97.7 HTZ FM (Western NY, Southern ONT)
- 105.1 THE RIVER/CJRN 710 (Buffalo/Niagara)
- OMNI Media (St.Catharines)
- 91.7 SPIRIT (Niagara, Toronto)
- Rogers Television (Toronto)
- Toronto Sun (Toronto)
- Toronto Star
- Global Television
- CBC Televisión
- City TV
- CTV
- CHCH Television
- CP 24
- Globe and Mail
- EZ Rock Toronto
- EZ Rock St Catharines
- 820 CHAM
- 98.1 CHFI
- 1470 CHOW
- WKBW TV (Buffalo)
- WUTV Fox 29 (Buffalo)
- WGRZ TV (Buffalo)
- Kiss 98.5 (Buffalo)
- The Buffalo News
- 97 Rock (Buffalo)
- Joy 96.1 FM (Buffalo)
- WIVB TV (Buffalo)
- 91.7 Giant FM
- Hamilton Spectator
- Niagara Falls Review
- St Catharines Standard
- Welland Tribune
- Cogeco Cable (Niagara Falls)
- 610 CKTB
- BN News
- City TV (Barrie)
- CBC Radio
- Niagara This Week
- Toronto Argos
- Buffalo Bills
- Air Canada Flight Magazine
- 1010 CFRB
- Kiss FM
- CFNY
