= ArieScope Pictures =

ArieScope Pictures is a film and television production company based in Los Angeles and founded in 1998 by Adam Green, Will Barrat, and Cory Neal. The studio focuses on horror and comedy productions, as the Hatchet's series, Frozen (2010) and the Fearnet TV sit-com Holliston.

== History ==
Adam Green met Will Barrat when he was working for a local cable advertising company in the Boston area. They borrowed equipment from the advertising company for starting ArieScope Pictures.

The first film produced by Green and Barrat was a parody of Friday the 13th and Halloween called Columbus Day Weekend. A major talent agency requested Adam Green a feature. He wrote, direct, and starred in the film that would be the plot for the pilot episode of Holliston. The movie won Best Picture in an independent film festival.

Between 2007 and 2010, ArieScope Pictures produced Hatchet, Spiral, and Grace, the last one being the first movie that Adam Green didn't write and direct, and it helped to launch Paul Solet's career.

Peter Block worked for Frozen. After he became President of FEARnet, he requested to the company a TV Series. Adam Green proposed a sitcom. Block agreed, and Holliston started its first season.

== Selected films ==
- Hatchet (2007)
- Spiral (2007)
- Frozen (2009)
- Grace (2009)
- Hatchet II (2010)
- Chillerama (2011)

== TV Series ==
- Holliston (2012)
