= Hatchet (film series) =

American slasher film series

- Official film series logo
- Created by: Adam Green
- Original work: Hatchet (2006)
- Years: 2006–present

Films and television
- Film(s): Hatchet (2006); Hatchet II (2010); Hatchet III (2013); Victor Crowley (2017)

Miscellaneous
- Related film(s): Frozen (2010)

The Hatchet film series consists of American slasher films developed from original characters created by Adam Green; including four feature length films. The plot primarily focuses on the unintentional encounters of innocent civilians, with the living urban legend of deformed hermit Victor Crowley (portrayed by Kane Hodder under heavy makeup) and the character's violent murders.

The series is notable for featuring multiple appearances by the actors of other slasher franchise characters: Kane Hodder (Jason Voorhees from Friday the 13th), Robert Englund (Freddy Krueger from A Nightmare on Elm Street), Tony Todd (Daniel Robitaille / Candyman from Candyman and William Bludworth / Grim Reaper from Final Destination), Zach Galligan (Billy Peltzer from Gremlins), Sid Haig (Johnny Lee Johns / Captain "Cutter" Spaulding from Rob Zombie's Firefly Trilogy Movies), R. A. Mihailoff (Bubba "Junior" Sawyer / Leatherface from The Texas Chainsaw Massacre), Derek Mears (Jason Voorhees in the 2009 Friday the 13th reboot), Tyler Mane (Michael Myers in the 2007 Halloween reboot), and Felissa Rose (Angela Baker from Sleepaway Camp). A fifth film was confirmed by Green to be in development, with the plot abandoning the usual setting of Honey Island Swamp in favor of an urban setting.

== Films ==
Film	U.S. release date	Director	Screenwriter	Producers
Hatchet	September 7, 2007	Adam Green	Adam Green	Scott Altomare, Sarah Elbert, Cory Neal
Hatchet II	October 1, 2010	Adam Green	Adam Green	Derek Curl, Sarah Elbert, Cory Neal
Hatchet III	June 14, 2013	B. J. McDonnell	Adam Green	Adam Green, Sarah Elbert
Victor Crowley	August 22, 2017	Adam Green	Adam Green	Adam Green, Will Barratt, Sarah Elbert, Cory Neal, Amanda Isaacson, Ben Rock

=== Hatchet (2006) ===
When a group of tourists in a New Orleans haunted swamp tour find themselves stranded in the wilderness, their evening of fun and spooks turns into a horrific nightmare.

== Main cast and characters ==
Many characters have played a part in the Hatchet series, most of which only having one-off appearances, but some protagonists such as Marybeth Dunston and Andrew Yong have been featured in multiple films, with Victor Crowley appearing in every film so far in the series.

- This table shows the recurring characters and the actors who have portrayed them throughout the series.
- A dark grey cell indicates the character was not in the film, or that the character's presence in the film has not yet been announced.
- A ^{C} indicates a cameo appearance.

Character	Films				Related film
Character	Hatchet	Hatchet II	Hatchet III	Victor Crowley	Frozen
Character	2006	2010	2013	2017	2010
Victor Crowley	Kane Hodder	Kane Hodder	Kane Hodder	Kane Hodder	
Marybeth Dunston	Tamara Feldman	Danielle Harris	Danielle Harris	Danielle Harris^{C}	
Shawn	Parry Shen				
Justin		Parry Shen			
Andrew			Parry Shen	Parry Shen	
Ben	Joel Moore		Joel Moore^{C}	Joel Moore^{P}	
Reverend Zombie	Tony Todd	Tony Todd		Tony Todd^{C}	
Misty	Mercedes McNab	Mercedes McNab^{C}			
Jenna	Joleigh Fioreavanti	Joleigh Fioreavanti^{C}			
Sampson Dunston	Robert Englund				
Parker O'Neal		Emma Bell^{C}			Emma Bell
Trent Graves		R.A. Mihailoff			
Tyler Hawes			Derek Mears		
Kathleen				Felissa Rose	

== Additional crew and production details ==
Film	Crew/Detail					
Film	Composer	Cinematographer	Editor	Production companies	Distributing company	Running time
Hatchet	Andy Garfield	Will Barratt	Christopher Roth	ArieScope Pictures, Radioaktive Film, High Seas Entertainment	Anchor Bay Entertainment	1 hr 23 mins
Hatchet II	Andy Garfield	Will Barratt	Ed Marx	ArieScope Pictures, Dark Sky Films	Dark Sky Entertainment	1 hr 25 mins
Hatchet III	Scott Glasgow	Will Barratt	Ed Marx	ArieScope Pictures, Dark Sky Films	Dark Sky Entertainment	1 hr 22 mins
Victor Crowley	Jason Akers & Sam Ewing	Jan-Michael Losada	Matt Latham	ArieScope Pictures, Dark Sky Films	Dark Sky Entertainment	1 hr 23 mins

== Reception ==
=== Box office performance ===
Film	U.S. release date	Budget	Box office revenue
Hatchet	August 7, 2007	$1,500,000	$302,396
Hatchet II	October 1, 2010	—N/a	$156,190
Hatchet III	June 14, 2013	$1,200,000	—N/a
Victor Crowley	August 22, 2017	—N/a	—N/a

== Other media ==
=== Related film ===
In Hatchet II, released seven months after Adam Green's Frozen, Emma Bell appears in an uncredited cameo reprising her role as Parker O'Neal (the protagonist of Frozen), in a scene serving as an epilogue to the main events of Frozen. In the scene, Parker is revealed to have successfully sued the ski resort for abandoning her, Dan, and Joe to the wolves, declaring that she will never go skiing again.

=== Comic books ===
In 2017, after four feature films, series creator Adam Green would green-light Adam Green's Hatchet (2017)—a four-issue comic book retelling of the 2006 film published by American Mythology. The issues were written by James Kuhoric and illustrated by Andrew Mangum. American Mythology would follow this with an original limited edition Hatchet saga, Hatchet: Vengeance—which follows Victor Crowley facing off against another monster inhabiting the fictitious Honey Island Swamp. On October 9, 2019, the anthological three-issue limited series Victor Crowley's Hatchet Halloween Tales was released, issue one written by Jason Pell, two by SA Check, and three by James Kuhoric. Halloween Tales would be expanded with the anthological Halloween Tales II in September 2020—again a three-issue limited series. Green makes his comic writing debut with the first issue that focuses on three witches trespassing Crowley's lair, while previous writers Pell and Kuhoric return to write the second and third issues, respectively. July 2021 featured the release of the one-shot comic Adam Green's Hatchet: Unstoppable Horror. In October of that year, Halloween Tales continued with Victor Crowley's Hatchet Halloween Tales III.
