= Digging Up the Marrow =

Digging up the Marrow
- Theatrical release poster
- Directed by: Adam Green
- Written by: Adam Green
- Produced by: Cory Neal
- Starring: Ray Wise; Adam Green
- Cinematography: Will Barratt
- Edited by: Will Barratt; Josh Ethier; Adam Green
- Music by: Bear McCreary
- Production company: Ariescope Pictures
- Distributed by: Hacienda Film Co.
- Release dates: August 23, 2014 (London FrightFest Film Festival); February 20, 2015 (United States)
- Running time: 88 minutes
- Country: United States
- Language: English
- Box office: $10,969

Digging up the Marrow is a 2014 American independent mockumentary found footage comedy horror film written and directed by Adam Green. It stars Green as a fictionalized version of himself who, in the process of making a documentary about monsters, is contacted by a man, played by Ray Wise, who insists that he can prove monsters are real.

== Plot ==
Filmmaker Adam Green begins a documentary about artworks featuring monsters. William Dekker, a retired detective, contacts Green and claims to have proof of monsters's existence. Despite his wife's skepticism, Green reworks the documentary to focus more on Dekker and his efforts to expose the monsters' underground home or metropolis, which he calls "The Marrow".

Green interviews Dekker, who claims to have seen many monsters and identifies some of them through sketches. Dekker briefly mentions his son but evades the topic when Green inquires.

The shooting crew of Green and his cameraman wait at the Marrow's entrance; a dug-up hole in the cemetery in the woods which is supposed to be one of the many gates to the underground metropolis of monsters. On the first night, they do not see anything although Dekker keeps claiming that he could see one of the monsters. During the second attempt, the camera catches a brief glimpse of a creature, but the crew voices their concern that it might be a hoax setup by Dekker.

The crew set up five cameras and lighting equipments, then vacate the area. One of the cameras, Camera-2, goes missing. Other cameras capture a monster coming out of the hole, and reveals that Dekker often visits and communicates with, or feeds, one of the monsters at the Marrow. However the footage is not very clear.

Meanwhile, Green finds out that Dekker had approached other directors with his story and the Boston police department do not recognize him. A suspicious Green travel with his cameraman to the Marrow, intend to find out whether the monster is real. They begin to make noise at the entrance of the hole and Dekker arrives there too, and soon they are violently attacked by monsters. They escape in their car. Green and his cameraman leave a distraught Dekker in his house.

Next morning they find that Dekker has abandoned the house and they couldn't trace him. However, there is a room with broken chains, implying a monster had been trapped there. Dekker probably believes that one of the monsters is his son and used to trap him there.

The movie ends with Green telling the audience that they lost all contact with Dekker and the missing camera-2 was "delivered" to him. Then footage from camera-2 shows Dekker trapped in a cage by an unseen monster or monsters forcing him to say that there are no such things as monsters, and then the camera shows the unseen monster going to Green's home, going into his bedroom showing him and his wife asleep; and after a loud noise made by the monster, startling and awakening Green, the footage ends.

== Cast ==
- Adam Green as himself
- Ray Wise as William Dekker
- Will Barratt as himself
- Josh Ethier as himself/Vance/Little Bigfoot
- Rileah Vanderbilt as herself
- Kane Hodder as himself
- Sarah Elbert as herself
- Tom Holland as himself
- Mick Garris as himself
- Alex Pardee as himself/Park Ranger
  - Matthew Waters as the voice of Park Ranger
- James McCarthy as Sgt. Sean Ross
- Nic Henley as Harlequin
- Caitlin Brisbin as Tomstone
- Robert Pendergraft as Shadow

Tony Todd, Steve Agee, Joe Lynch, Lloyd Kaufman, Don Coscarelli, Corri English, Oderus Urungus, Laura Ortiz, Evan Dickson, and Steven Barton all cameo as themselves.

== Production ==
The initial concept for the film came from fan mail sent by Alex Pardee that purported to tell the true history of a character Green had created, Victor Crowley. Green was taken with the mail and wanted to interview the author, but he could not interest anyone else in the project, as they were worried that the fan could turn out to be unbalanced. The project further coalesced when Green met Pardee at a convention. Pardee, an artist, shared his story Digging Up the Marrow, in which an artist is commissioned to paint purportedly real monsters. Green then combined the two ideas. Casting for Dekker was difficult for the filmmakers, because they were not sure whether they should use an unknown or a famous actor. Ultimately, they decided that it would be too distracting for audiences to suddenly be taken out of the film when real monsters were introduced. As a result, Wise was cast so that it would be obvious from the start that the film was not an attempted hoax. Though Wise's casting was initially controversial among people to whom Green showed a work print, they came around to his point of view when he explained the reasoning. Of casting himself, Green said that it grounded the film and made the events seem more real. When writing the script, Green wanted to make sure that the in-jokes did not impact on the enjoyment of general audiences unfamiliar with his work. Green said that they were added bonuses for fans who noticed them.

Production began in 2010 and slowly progressed over the next four years whenever Green had free time between projects. Green suffered two major setbacks during filming: the death of his friend Dave Brockie, and his divorce from Rileah Vanderbilt. Both events caused him to question the project, and he was tempted to remove their scenes. In both cases, he was convinced not to. In order to keep a low profile, Green announced that he was making an art documentary. He said this because he believed that the only way the film could work was if it were not hyped, and he knew that the film would attract unwanted attention if its true subject matter were leaked. The opening interviews were unscripted, but everything else was. The actors were not given a full script but had to work with only their own lines. Barratt was the only actor who read the entire script. Despite some reviews that praised the film as a guerrilla production, it was not.

Most of the film's effects were practical. Sculptor Greg Aronowitz worked off of Pardee's designs, and Pardee supervised. Robert Pendergraft created the make-up effects, fabricated the monsters, and operated them. Green knew that he would have to show monsters in a self-described monster film, but the team had difficulty in creating working animatronic monsters, as Pardee's designs were so surreal. Green said there were no ego issues involved in the process, and Pardee and Aronowitz still enjoy collaborating in their spare time for fun. When each monster was designed, it would inspire different monsters. Green said that he wanted to use monster designs that were unique, instead of redoing designs that had been seen many times before. According to Green, because the studios were uninterested in original designs, the film was only possible as an independent production.

== Release ==
An early cut was shown at Butt-Numb-A-Thon in 2013. Digging up the Marrow premiered at the London FrightFest Film Festival on August 23, 2014. In October 2014, Image Entertainment purchased the distribution rights to the film. It was released to video on demand on February 20, 2015, and Green went on a tour to distribute the film. Green said of the self-distribution that it is impossible to get a fair deal with sites like Netflix and Hulu without a major distributor. In order to avoid these poor deals and issues with distributors who claim to have not made any money, they decided to handle everything themselves. It was released on DVD and Blu-ray on March 24, 2015. This version contains 25–30 minutes of extended footage that was cut from the film.

== Reception ==
Rotten Tomatoes, a review aggregator, reports that 60% of 20 surveyed critics gave the film a positive review; the average rating is 5.7/10. Metacritic rated it 45/100 based on eight reviews. Frank Scheck of The Hollywood Reporter called it "a playfully self-reflexive exercise whose endless in-jokes will best be appreciated by only the most ardent genre aficionados". Maitland McDonagh of Film Journal International wrote, "A meta-variation on Clive Barker's Nightbreed, Digging Up the Marrow tackles all the same questions–what makes a monster, are they good or bad, et al.—with considerably less grace and intelligence." Michael Rechtshaffen of the Los Angeles Times called it "more mind-numbing than bone-chilling". Nick Schager of The Village Voice wrote that after poking fun at found footage films, it becomes "the very dull, clichéd thing it mocks." Ignatiy Vishnevetsky of The A.V. Club rated it B− and called it "more playful than genuinely creepy" and said that it does not live up to its potential. Ken W. Hanley of Fangoria rated it 2.5/4 stars and described its ambition as both its greatest asset and downfall. Simon Abrams of RogerEbert.com rated it 1.5/4 stars and wrote, "Digging Up the Marrow is a decent idea, but beyond some fun creature effects, and a surprisingly grounded performance from character actor Ray Wise, the film just sits there." Wes Greene of Slant Magazine rated it 2/4 stars and said that it "ultimately becomes the shopworn horror story that Green purports to upend with plenty of self-aware snark". Mike D'Angelo of The Dissolve rated it 3/5 stars and called it "more of an affectionate comedy than a horror movie, despite a third act that features some tense moments and hostile critters." Patrick Cooper of Bloody Disgusting rated it 2/5 stars and wrote that the film "can be very fun at times, but overall Digging Up the Marrow is a tiresome and exasperatingly self-aggrandizing trip." Scott Hallam of Dread Central rated it 4/5 stars and wrote, "Not only is it an extremely clever and unique movie experience, it gives Green’s fans exactly what they want: more Adam Green." Patrick Bromley of Daily Dead rated it 4/5 stars and wrote, "Digging Up the Marrow isn't just a terrific horror movie; it's a movie about why we are drawn to horror movies."
