= Will Barratt =

American cinematographer and producer

- Born: William Barratt; Shelburne, Massachusetts, USA
- Occupation: Cinematographer
- Years active: 1998–present
- Organization: ArieScope Pictures
- Notable work: Hatchet (2006); Frozen (2010); Holliston (2012–2015)
- Website: ariescope.com

William Barratt is an American cinematographer and producer best known for his work on the films of the Adam Green. He went to college at the University of Massachusetts and later attended the International Film and Television Workshop. Barratt was nominated for the 2014 BloodGuts UK Horror award for Digging Up the Marrow. In 2015 he won the Best Cinematography from the Hollywood Reel Independent Film Festival for his work on the short film Boudoir.

== ArieScope ==
Barratt is the cofounder of ArieScope Pictures. He founded the company in 1998 with Adam Green and Cory Neal. He and Green would make their first movie, Coffee & Donuts, the same year using borrowed camera equipment from their day job. In addition to every one of Green's features, Barratt has also completed twenty five shorts with ArieScope.

== Filmography ==
Cinematographer:

- Wire Room (2022)
- Bad Apples (2018)
- The Meanest Man in Texas (2017)
- Shooting the Warwicks (2015)
- Mothers of the Bride (2015)
- Digging Up the Marrow (2015)
- Tom Holland's Twisted Tales (2014)
- Hatchet III (2013)
- Coldwater (2013)
- Reality Show (2012)
- Parasitic (2012)
- Holliston (2012)
- Chillerama (2011)
- Sexy Nightmare Slayers (2011)
- Hatchet II (2011)
- Frozen (2010)
- House Arrest with Andy Dick (2009)
- Spiral (2007)
- It's a Mall World (2007)
- Hatchet (2006)
- Coffee & Donuts (2000)

Producer:

- Horrified (2015)
- Holliston (2012)
- Grace (2009)

Actor:

- Digging Up the Marrow (2015)
