= Joe Lynch (director) =

American film director (born 1976)

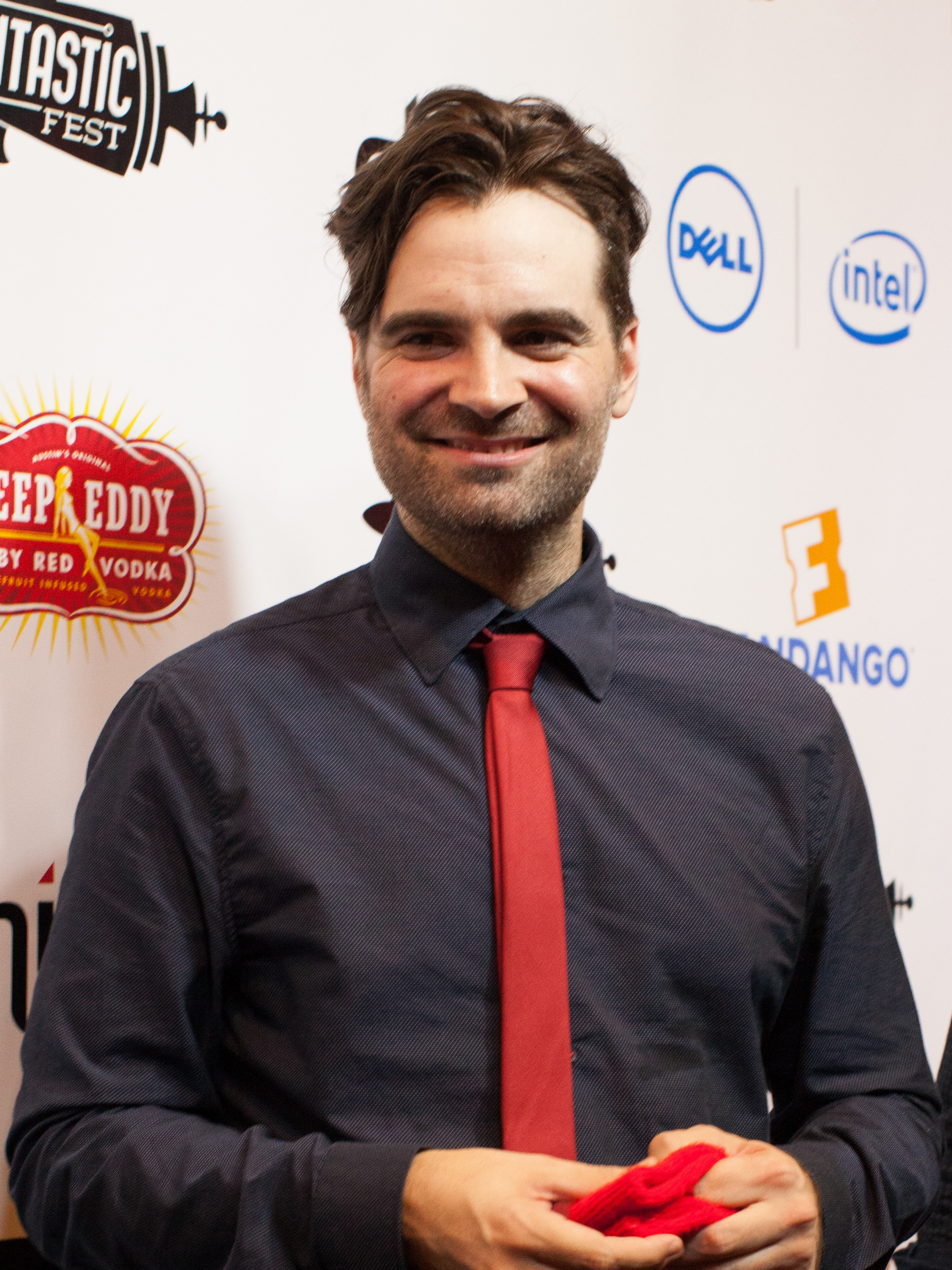
- Lynch in 2014
- Born: March 23, 1976 (age 50); Long Island, New York, U.S.
- Education: Syracuse University
- Occupations: Director; actor; producer; cinematographer
- Years active: 1999–present

Joe Lynch (born March 23, 1976) is an American film and music video director, film producer, cinematographer, and actor.

== Life and career ==
Lynch was born on Long Island, New York. Though he began his career as a child actor, he soon became obsessed with filmmaking itself. While studying at Syracuse University, he made a couple of student short films with mAHARBA and hiBeams, which were selected to screen at many film festivals. Lynch graduated in 1998 with a bachelor's degree in visual and performing arts.

Lynch has directed music videos for such groups as DVDA, Pete Yorn, Strapping Young Lad, Faith No More, 311, and Godhead. He was also one of the creators of the television show Uranium for Fuse TV.

His director debut in a feature film was 2007's Wrong Turn 2: Dead End, which starred Henry Rollins, Erica Leerhsen, and Texas Battle.

Lynch is a lifelong genre film fan (especially horror) and has appeared as a featured guest at several Weekend of Horrors conventions. He has also appeared in several short films, including director Adam Green's 2007 Halloween short "The Tiffany Problem" alongside Joel Moore and Corri English. Lynch worked at G4 as creative director of the website, and appears as a special guest on its popular series Attack of the Show! in a horror-themed segment called "Body Count".

Lynch was one of the four directors who collaborated on the comedy horror anthology Chillerama, which was released by Image Entertainment on November 29, 2011 after a successful festival and "roadshow" theatrical run. Lynch directed the wraparound portions set in a drive-in playing four obscure genre films. He also appeared as "Fernando Phagabeefy", director of the fourth film, Deathication.

His next feature-length film was released in 2012. Knights of Badassdom, a "horror/adventure/comedy" film, stars Ryan Kwanten, Steve Zahn, Summer Glau, Danny Pudi, Jimmi Simpson, and Peter Dinklage. Lynch disowned the movie after significant interference from the studio.

Lynch also executive produced and was the creative showrunner for G4tv.com's "Epictober Film Festival", producing three horror/video game-themed short films by directors Drew Daywalt, Gregg Bishop and Sam Balcomb, which premiered in October 2011.

In addition to his directing career, Lynch is also the co-star on the sitcom Holliston, along with director Adam Green, which premiered on Fearnet on April 3, 2012. Lynch also served as executive producer on the show.

Lynch's next film was the action/thriller Everly, which went into production in the summer of 2013, with Salma Hayek in the title role. The film also starred Jennifer Blanc and Togo Igawa. The screenplay was written by Yale Hannon, based on a story by Lynch and Hannon. The film was produced by Crime Scene Pictures & Anonymous Content. Lynch also directed the Bear McCreary & Raya Yarbrough music video "Silent Night", released as a bonus on Everly's Blu-ray.

In 2013, Lynch wrote and directed the short film Truth in Journalism, based on the Marvel character Eddie Brock/Venom. This short was also partially influenced by the film Man Bites Dog. The film stars Ryan Kwanten as the titular character. He also executive produced the Czech-Ukrainian horror film Ghoul, which was released in the U.S. in March 2015.

In 2016, Lynch directed the action horror film Mayhem, which was produced by Circle of Confusion. The film starred Steven Yeun and Samara Weaving. The film had a simultaneous limited theatrical and VOD/digital HD release in the U.S. on November 10, 2017.

In 2017, Lynch signed on to direct an upcoming horror film Taste based on a screenplay by No One Lives writer David Cohen. The film will be produced by Erin Eggers, Chase Hudson and Matthew Porter of Penchant Entertainment with Cohen. Production was slated to begin in Los Angeles in the summer of 2017.

== Filmography ==
=== Film ===
| Year | Title | Director | Writer | Producer | Notes |
|---|---|---|---|---|---|
| 2007 | Wrong Turn 2: Dead End | Yes | No | No | |
| 2011 | Chillerama | Yes | Yes | Yes | segment: Zom-B-Movie |
| 2013 | Knights of Badassdom | Yes | No | No | |
| 2014 | Everly | Yes | Yes | No | |
| 2017 | Mayhem | Yes | No | No | |
| 2019 | Point Blank | Yes | No | No | |
| 2023 | Suitable Flesh | Yes | No | No | |
| 2027 | Buzzkill | Yes | No | No | Post-production |

Executive producer

- Something Real and Good (2013)
- Ghoul (2015)
- Suitable Flesh (2023)

Acting roles

| Year | Title | Role | Notes |
|---|---|---|---|
| 1999 | Terror Firmer | Clothespin Boy | |
| 2007 | Wrong Turn 2: Dead End | Guy on TV Screen | uncredited |
| 2009 | Sweatshop | Ghost | Credited as "Fernando Phagabeefy" |
| 2010 | Frozen | Guy on Chairlift #2 | uncredited |
| 2010 | Hatchet II | Gator Hunter | uncredited |
| 2011 | Chillerama | Fernando Phagabeefy | uncredited |
| 2014 | Everly | SWAT Officer | |
| 2017 | Mayhem | Ray the IT Guy | uncredited |
| 2017 | Victor Crowley | Pilot Matthew Waters | uncredited |
| 2019 | Point Blank | Cameraman | |
| 2020 | Serious Sam 4 | Kenny | voice |
| 2021 | Happy Slashers | Buffalo Bill | voice |
| 2023 | The Talos Principle 2 | Trevor | voice |
| 2023 | Suitable Flesh | Ray the Orderly | |
| 2025 | The Talos Principle Reawakened | Trevor | voice |

Documentary appearances

- Making Gore Look Good (2007)
- More Blood, More Guts: The Making of 'Wrong Turn 2' (2007)
- On Location with P-Nut (2007)
- His Name Was Jason: 30 Years of Friday the 13th (2009)
- Into the Dark: Exploring the Horror Film (2009)
- The Psycho Legacy (2010)

=== Television ===
| Year | Title | Director | Producer | Notes |
|---|---|---|---|---|
| 2007 | Attack of the Show! | No | Segment | 1 episode |
| 2012-2013 | Holliston | Yes | Executive | |
| 2016 | 12 Deadly Days | Yes | Yes | 1 episode |
| 2018 | My Dead Ex | Yes | No | 2 episodes |
| 2021 | Creepshow | Yes | No | 4 episodes |
| 2022 | Ultra Violet & Black Scorpion | Yes | No | 2 episodes |
| 2024 | Tales From the Void | Yes | No | 1 episode |

Acting roles

| Year | Title | Role |
|---|---|---|
| 2012-2018 | Holliston | Joe |
