= Tamara Feldman =

American actress

- Born: December 5, 1980 (age 45); Wichita, Kansas, U.S.
- Occupation: Actress
- Years active: 2002–present

Amara Zaragoza (born December 5, 1980), known by her stage name Tamara Feldman, is an American actress.

== Career ==
Feldman is known for playing Marybeth Dunston in the horror film Hatchet (2006) and for her roles in the television series Smallville (2002), Supernatural (2006), Dirty Sexy Money (2007–2009), Gossip Girl (2008–2012) and The Mob Doctor (2012–2013).

She was replaced by Danielle Harris as Marybeth Dunston in Hatchet II, Hatchet III and Victor Crowley. She was featured in the music video of NSYNC's 2000 hit "This I Promise You". She is shown as one of the couples sitting at a table towards the end of the video as well as walking in slow motion at the 2:14 time stamp.

== Personal life ==
In 2015, Feldman was diagnosed with multiple sclerosis. She decided to ride a horse across the United States in aid of the charity Race to Erase MS, which she documented on her website "And So I Ride". After four months, the journey came to a close due to fatigue and health problems. Her sister also has MS. Originally named Tamara Feldman, she changed her name after working with an Aztec Medicine man for a month to help her with her Multiple Sclerosis. He urged her to drop the "T" because "Amara" is "beloved" and use her maternal grandmother's last name so the spirits wouldn't know she has MS. So Amara does not have MS, but Tamara does.

== Filmography ==
=== Film ===
Year	Title	Role	Notes
2004	Geldersma	Norah Sobel	Short film
2005	Slumming	The Girl	Short film
2006	Hatchet	Marybeth Dunston	
2007	Perfect Stranger	Bethany	
2008	Something's Wrong in Kansas	Sabrina	
2008	Rez Bomb	Harmony	
2008	The Nature of Space & Time	Angela Davies	Short film
2009	Echelon Conspiracy	Kamila	
2011	Alyce Kills	Carroll	
2012	Bloodwork	Linnea	
2013	Walk the Light	Julia	Short film
2013	Resurrection Slope		Short film
2014	A Woman Called Job	Job	
2015	The Last Kill	Beth	Short film
2016	Ovid and the Art of Love	Julia the Younger	
2019	Shadow Wolves	Cheyenne	
2023	Reporting for Christmas	Mary	

=== Television ===
Year	Title	Role	Notes
2002	Smallville	Kyla Willowbrook	Episode: "Skinwalker"
2004	Like Family	Anna Sinclair	Episode: "Romancing the Home"
2004	Jake 2.0	Vanessa Cardounel	Episode: "Blackout"
2005	Romy and Michele: In the Beginning	Snotty Girl #2	Television film; uncredited
2005	Boston Legal	Cassie	Recurring role; 2 episodes
2006	Monk	Kendra Frank	Episode: "Mr. Monk Goes to a Rock Concert"
2006	Supernatural	Angela Mason	Episode: "Children Shouldn't Play with Dead Things"
2007–2009	Dirty Sexy Money	Natalie Kimpton	Recurring role; 6 episodes
2008–2012	Gossip Girl	Poppy Lifton	Recurring role; 6 episodes
2009	CSI: NY	Carolyn Williams / Kathy / Lisa	Episode: "She's Not There"
2009	Life	Sasha	Episode: "I Heart Mom"
2009	Royal Pains	April	Recurring role; 2 episodes
2009	One Tree Hill	Courtney Smith	Episode: "Your Cheatin' Heart"
2012	Drop Dead Diva	Fiona Crupp	Episode: "Lady Parts"
2012–2013	The Mob Doctor	Amanda King	Guest role; 2 episodes
2013	Switched at Birth	Carrie Raisler	Episode: "As the Shadows Deepen"
2014	CSI: Crime Scene Investigation	Amanda Holland	Episode: "Angle of Attack"
2018–2019	Strange Angel	Joan	Recurring role; 13 episodes
2021–2022	Walker	Denise Davidson	Recurring role; 12 episodes

=== Music videos ===
Year	Title	Role	Artist
2013	"Swerve City"	Woman	Deftones
