= Studio 666 =

2022 American comedy horror film directed by B. J. McDonnell

- Theatrical release poster
- Directed by: B. J. McDonnell
- Screenplay by: Jeff Buhler; Rebecca Hughes
- Story by: Dave Grohl
- Produced by: John Ramsey; James A. Rota
- Starring: Dave Grohl; Nate Mendel; Pat Smear; Taylor Hawkins; Chris Shiflett; Rami Jaffee; Whitney Cummings; Leslie Grossman; Will Forte; Jenna Ortega; Jeff Garlin
- Cinematography: Michael Dallatorre; Eric Leach
- Edited by: Byron Wong
- Music by: Roy Mayorga
- Production companies: Roswell Films; Therapy Studios
- Distributed by: Open Road Films; Briarcliff Entertainment
- Release dates: February 16, 2022 (TCL Chinese Theatre); February 25, 2022 (United States)
- Running time: 106 minutes
- Country: United States
- Language: English
- Box office: $3 million

Studio 666 is a 2022 American comedy horror film directed by B. J. McDonnell from a screenplay by Jeff Buhler and Rebecca Hughes, based on a story by Dave Grohl, who stars, alongside his Foo Fighters bandmates Nate Mendel in his film debut, Pat Smear, Taylor Hawkins in his final film, Chris Shiflett in his feature film debut, and Rami Jaffee in his film debut, portraying fictionalized version of themselves.

Whitney Cummings, Leslie Grossman, Will Forte, Jenna Ortega, and Jeff Garlin co-star in the ensemble cast. In the film, the Foo Fighters move into a cursed mansion to record a new album.

Studio 666 is the first non-documentary to feature the Foo Fighters; the band was previously the subject of the film Foo Fighters: Back and Forth (2011) and the television series Foo Fighters: Sonic Highways (2014). The film was released theatrically in the United States on February 25, 2022, by Open Road Films and Briarcliff Entertainment. It received mixed reviews.

== Plot ==
In 1993 Encino, Skye Willow, drummer of the heavy metal band Dream Widow, is crawling along the floor with a broken leg, followed closely by band's frontman, Greg Nole, who is holding a hammer. Skye sees the body of another band member, who has had his jaw broken by Greg, before Greg drives the hammer through her forehead and repeatedly hits her head with it, crushing her skull. Greg then hangs himself from a window.

In 2019, the Foo Fighters—Dave Grohl, Taylor Hawkins, Rami Jaffee, Nate Mendel, Chris Shiflett, and Pat Smear—are pressured by their manager Jeremy Shill to overcome their writer's block and record a new album. The group move into the mansion, where Grohl becomes fascinated with the house as a source of inspiration. One of their tech helps, Krug, is electrocuted by a wire and the band decides to dedicate their album to him.

Grohl finds a basement containing satanic objects and is possessed by Nole's demonic soul after listening to a demo tape. Under the demon's control, Grohl forces the band to continue production on the album. Later, a delivery man named Darren, who had earlier tried to give Grohl a demo tape, is decapitated outside the manor by an unknown figure with hedge clippers. The next day, as Shiflett is cooking on the grill, the same figure pushes his face onto it. Shiflett attempts to escape but he has his head smashed with the grill cover and is stabbed repeatedly in the neck, before the figure is revealed to be Grohl.

The band later finds Darren's corpse, but Grohl convinces them not to call the police and takes their phones. After watching Grohl eating Shiflett's remains, the band soon learn of the mansion's backstory and Grohl's possession with the help of a neighbor, Samantha. To exorcise Grohl, they need to find a book needed to free him of the possession. As Samantha and Jaffee have sex, they are both killed when Grohl sneaks under the bed and drives a chainsaw through their heads, before cutting them in half. Hawkins is pressured by Grohl to finish the song while Mendel and Smear retrieve the book from the basement. Hawkins finishes the song and is partially decapitated by Grohl with a cymbal.

Mendel and Smear free Grohl from the possession, and the souls of the Dream Widow band members send the demon to hell. However, Jeremy and real estate developer Barb Weems ambush the remaining members, revealing that they planned the whole thing. While Smear is fixing a car from underneath, Mendel is stabbed in the eye, causing him to accidentally hit the gas, which runs over Smear's head and runs over Barb. As Mendel gets out of the car to help Barb, she stabs him through the chin and dies alongside him. Grohl battles Jeremy only to back down in horror when Jeremy tells him of the album's success and the start of his solo career. One year later, Grohl, the only Foo Fighter survivor, prepares to perform a solo concert, with marks of possession around his eyes.

== Cast ==
Foo Fighters

- Dave Grohl – lead vocals, guitar
- Taylor Hawkins – drums
- Rami Jaffee – keyboards, piano
- Nate Mendel – bass guitar
- Chris Shiflett – guitar
- Pat Smear – guitar

Other

- Whitney Cummings as Samantha
- Will Forte as Darren Sandelbaum
- Jeff Garlin as Jeremy Shill
- Leslie Grossman as Barb Weems
- Kerry King as Krug
- Jenna Ortega as Skye Willow
- Marti Matulis as the Caretaker
- Lionel Richie as himself
- Jason Trost as Tech
- Jimmi Simpson as Venue person
- John Carpenter as Studio engineer

== Production ==
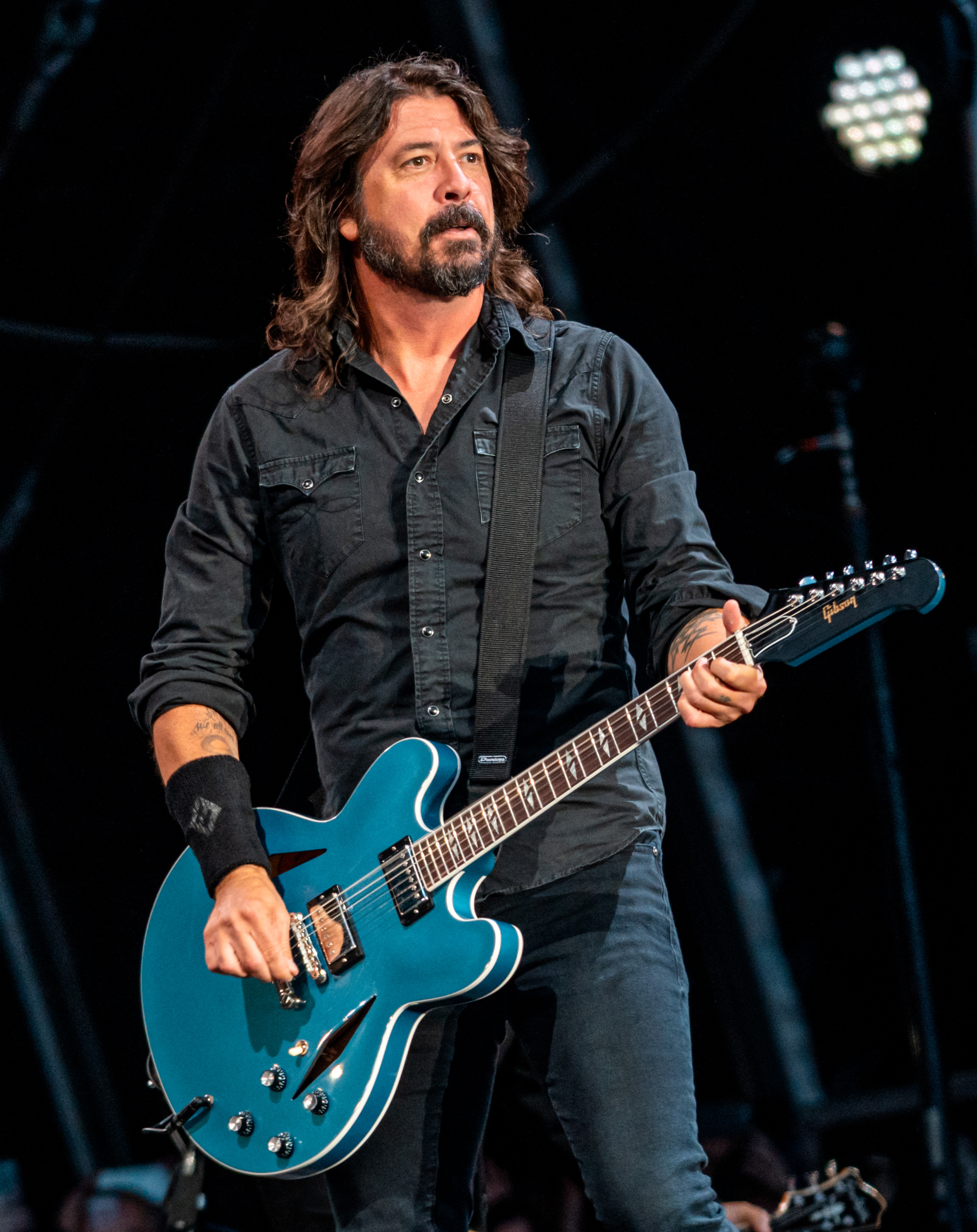
Writer and lead actor Dave Grohl

In November 2021, it was reported that a film starring the Foo Fighters entitled Studio 666 had been shot in secret. John Ramsey and James A. Rota produced the film, while the bandmates served as executive producers. Hatchet III filmmaker B. J. McDonell directed the film, working from a script written by Jeff Bulher and Rebecca Hughes, based on a story from Grohl inspired by their experiences recording their tenth album.

Filming took place in the same house the band recorded their album Medicine at Midnight. Nearing the end of filming in early 2020, production was shut down due to the COVID-19 pandemic in the United States. Production resumed in Los Angeles months later, becoming one of the first films to do so during the pandemic. Six days of filming were planned to finish the film, but it would ultimately span three weeks due to the regulations put in place to film safely.

== Music ==
Grohl recorded a whole album of heavy metal songs for the in-movie fictional band Dream Widow. John Carpenter also contributed to the film's soundtrack, having co-composed the opening credits. The album was released on March 25, 2022, consisting of eight tracks.

== Release ==
=== Theatrical and marketing ===
Studio 666 was released theatrically on February 25, 2022, by Open Road Films. The film held its world premiere at the TCL Chinese Theatre on February 16, 2022. According to social media analytic RelishMix, the marketing campaign made 97.9 million interactions online, "in line with horror genre norms".

=== Home media ===
The film released as a digital rent on March 18, 2022. The film was released to Blu-ray and DVD on May 24, 2022, by Universal Pictures Home Entertainment.

== Reception ==
=== Box office ===
In the United States and Canada, Studio 666 was released alongside Cyrano, and was projected to gross $2–5 million from 2,306 theaters in its opening weekend. The film earned $1.54 million in its opening weekend. Men made up 58% of the audience during its opening, with those in the age range of 25–44 comprising 53% of ticket sales and those between 18 and 44 comprising 73%. The ethnic breakdown of the audience showed that 69% were Caucasian, 18% Hispanic and Latino Americans, 3% African American, and 10% Asian or other. The film dropped out of the box-office top ten in its second weekend, finishing twelfth with $342,262.

=== Critical response ===
On the review aggregator website Rotten Tomatoes, 56% of 126 critics' reviews are positive, with an average rating of 5.3/10. The website's consensus reads: "Studio 666 doesn't quite take its horror-comedy hybrid to 11, but if you're in the mood, this cheerfully over-the-top outing is a lot of fun." Metacritic, which uses a weighted average, assigned the film a score of 50 out of 100, based on 26 critics, indicating "mixed or average" reviews. PostTrak reported 66% of audience members gave it a positive score, with 46% saying they would definitely recommend it.

Megan Navarro of Bloody Disgusting called Studio 666 "an entertaining jam session full of gore, laughs, and endearing moments between the band". In Paste, Matt Donato wrote: "It might run its welcome a bit long and struggle with more juvenile gags, but it’s still a proper midnighter that’ll have you barking (in laughter) at the moon." Ed Masley, writing for Arizona Republic, said it was "plenty gory" and "definitely rocks", but criticized the humor. Peter Bradshaw of The Guardian gave the film one star, saying it "sadly conforms to the horror-comedy tendency of being neither properly scary nor properly funny". He found it "disconcerting" that the premise involved "violent and horrible things that happened back in the 90s", including suicide, alluding to the suicide of Grohl's former bandmate Kurt Cobain.

== See also ==
- Number of the beast
