= Cavitycolors =

American horror-themed apparel company

- Industry: Online retail
- Founded: 2012; 14 years ago
- Founders: Aaron Crawford; Ricki Crawford
- Headquarters: Atlanta, Georgia, U.S.
- Website: cavitycolors.com

Cavitycolors, LLC. (also spelled Cavity Colors) is an American company known for releasing horror and Halloween-themed apparel, accessories, and other items. Founded in 2012, the company is headquartered in Atlanta, Georgia.

== History ==
Prior to the establishment of Cavitycolors, company co-founder Aaron Crawford was a freelance artist designing artwork for clothing and other merchandise for metal bands. In May 2012, he founded Cavitycolors as a means of releasing shirts and prints.

Cavitycolors has since collaborated with a number of different artists, and have acquired licensing rights to produce merchandise for a variety of properties, including Creep, Elvira, Mistress of the Dark, The Fog, Hatchet, Killer Klowns from Outer Space, Terminator 2: Judgment Day, and the Scream franchise.
