= Hatchet (film) =

- Theatrical release poster
- Directed by: Adam Green
- Written by: Adam Green
- Produced by: Cory Neal; Scott Altomare; Sarah Elbert
- Starring: Joel David Moore; Tamara Feldman; Deon Richmond; Mercedes McNab; Parry Shen; Joleigh Fioreavanti; Joel Murray; Richard Riehle; Patrika Darbo; Joshua Leonard; Tony Todd; Robert Englund; Kane Hodder
- Cinematography: Will Barratt
- Edited by: Christopher Roth
- Music by: Andy Garfield
- Production companies: ArieScope Pictures; High Seas Entertainment; Radioaktive Film
- Distributed by: Anchor Bay Entertainment (United States); Echo Bridge Entertainment (International)
- Release dates: April 27, 2006 (Tribeca Film Festival); September 7, 2007 (United States)
- Running time: 83 minutes
- Country: United States
- Language: English
- Budget: $1.5 million
- Box office: $208,550

Hatchet is a 2006 American slasher film written and directed by Adam Green. The film has an ensemble cast, including Joel David Moore, Tamara Feldman, Deon Richmond, Mercedes McNab, Parry Shen, Joleigh Fioreavanti, Joel Murray, Richard Riehle, Patrika Darbo, Joshua Leonard, Tony Todd, Robert Englund, and Kane Hodder. The plot follows a group of tourists on a New Orleans haunted swamp tour, who accidentally get stranded in the wilderness, only to be hunted by a vengeful, supernatural deformed man who kills anyone who enters the swamp.

Hatchet premiered at the Tribeca Film Festival on April 27, 2006, before releasing in limited theaters domestically on September 7, 2007. It received mixed reviews from critics, but became a cult classic among audiences. The film's successes spawned a film series including three sequels. A comic book series followed thereafter.

== Plot ==
Sampson and his son Ainsley are hunting alligators in a swamp. While Ainsley is urinating, Sampson falls silent; Ainsley finds Sampson dead before he, too, is killed by an unseen being.

During a Mardi Gras celebration in New Orleans, a group of friends, including Ben and his best friend Marcus, decide to go on a swamp tour. They find the tour closed because the guide, Rev. Zombie, was sued for negligence. Rev. Zombie suggests they try a place farther down the street owned by the inexperienced tour guide, Shawn. Ben pays for himself and Marcus, and Shawn leads them to his tour bus, where the other tourists, Jim and Shannon Permatteo, a Minnesota married couple, two models, Misty, Jenna and their agent, Shapiro, and hot-tempered Marybeth are waiting.

Guiding their boat through the swamp, they are warned to leave by a hermit, Jack Cracker, whose warnings are dismissed. As they venture further, the boat begins to sink, forcing them to abandon it. Jim is then bitten and injured by an alligator while Marybeth finds an abandoned shack, which she identifies as the old Crowley house. Marybeth tells the story of how deformed Victor Crowley and his father, Thomas, lived in the house until Victor's accidental death when Thomas accidentally struck Victor in the head with a hatchet while trying to free him from the house when it caught fire due to teens throwing fireworks at it in an attempt to scare Victor. After Thomas's eventual death, Victor is now said to roam the swamp as a vengeful spirit, killing those he comes across. Marybeth warns the group that they aren't safe in the swamp, but they dismiss her story as an urban legend.

As Jim and Shannon approach the house, Victor appears and kills them, causing the group to flee. Shapiro splits from the group and is killed by Victor. The remaining survivors decide to return to the house where they can arm themselves.

While at the house, Marybeth and Ben discover Sampson and Ainsley's remains. Marybeth reveals they were her father and brother, and she had come to the swamp to find their bodies. Victor then ambushes the group and critically injures Jenna with a belt sander. Shawn attempts to save Jenna by attacking Victor with a shovel but is disarmed and decapitated with it by Victor, who then finishes Jenna off by impaling her with the shovel.

The survivors decide to lure Victor back to his house and set him on fire with the gasoline tanks in the shed. While they do this, Misty goes missing; Ben then discovers her mutilated body when Victor throws her remains at him. Luring Victor into the house, the group ignites the tanks and sets Victor on fire, but rainfall extinguishes the fires. Victor then kills Marcus and chases after Ben and Marybeth, where a pole thrown by Victor impales Ben's foot. Marybeth and Ben push the pole forward, resulting in Victor being impaled on it when he charges after them, seemingly killing him.

Taking a spare boat out of the swamp, Marybeth falls into the water and is ensnared by seaweed. She sees Ben's hand at the surface, reaches up to it, and is pulled out, only to be met by Victor, who had severed Ben's arm and used it to bait Marybeth. Victor grabs Marybeth as Ben lies dying in the boat.

== Cast ==
- Joel Moore as Ben
- Tamara Feldman as Marybeth Dunston
- Deon Richmond as Marcus
- Mercedes McNab as Misty
- Joleigh Fioreavanti as Jenna
- Parry Shen as Shawn
- Joel Murray as Doug Shapiro
- Patrika Darbo as Shannon Permatteo
- Richard Riehle as Jim Permatteo
- Joshua Leonard as Ainsley
- Kane Hodder as Victor Crowley and Mr. Crowley
  - Rileah Vanderbilt as young Victor Crowley
- Robert Englund as Sampson
- Tony Todd as Reverend Zombie
- John Carl Buechler as Jack Cracker

== Production ==
=== Development ===
Director Adam Green said that he got the idea for antagonist Victor Crowley's backstory when he attended Camp Avoda in 1983 at age 8. During the first day at camp, the counselors had warned the kids that a man named Hatchet-Face would "come and get them" if they got near a particular cabin. Since Green was starting to get into horror movies, he decided to make up a backstory for Hatchet-Face, which he told to the rest of the kids in his cabin that same night. This backstory, which involved a deformed boy accidentally being killed by his father who was trying to save him from a house fire, was eventually re-used for Crowley's origin story.

To obtain financing for the film, producer Sarah Elbert convinced Green and cinematographer Will Barratt to shoot a brief teaser trailer in New Orleans before writing the script. The teaser simply consisted of establishing shots that Barratt filmed during a swamp tour, with narration done by the young daughter of one of Elbert's friends relaying Victor's backstory. The teaser was met with widespread praise upon release, and Green was able to earn sufficient funding for the film.

=== Production ===
Principal photography for the film began on April 25, 2005, with the film being shot around Sable Ranch in Santa Clarita. It was produced for a budget of $1.5 million.

== Release ==
Hatchet was selected for the 2006 London FrightFest Film Festival at The Odeon West End on August 25, 2006. It was introduced on stage by Adam Green who hosted a Q&A session afterwards.

The film was also selected for the Sitges International Film Festival in Spain, and Fantastic Fest in Austin, Texas, that same year. The film sold out both nights, resulting in extra folding chairs having to be set up in the theater and audience members sitting in the aisles. The film won the audience award for "Best Picture" as well as jury prizes for "Best Actor" (Kane Hodder) and "Best Special Effects".

It was selected for Germany's Fantasy Film Festival in 2006. As part of the festival, the film toured Munich, Stuttgart, Nuremberg, Frankfurt, Cologne, Bochum, Hamburg and Berlin.

Hatchet received a limited theatrical release in the United States, starting from September 7, 2007, by Anchor Bay Entertainment. The film received $208,550 in the domestic box office.

=== Reception ===
Hatchet received mixed reviews from critics. Peter Bradshaw from The Guardian awarded the film 2 out of 5 stars calling the film, "A reasonably serviceable horror [film]". Marc Savlov from Austin Chronicle gave the film 3½ out of 5 stars, praising the film's "quippy dialogue", orchestral score, and gore effects. Bloody Disgusting gave the film a positive review, praising the film's 80's slasher film style, calling it "A bloody great ride".

Based on 50 reviews collected by Rotten Tomatoes, Hatchet has an overall 56% approval rating from critics, with an average score of 5.6/10. The consensus states, "The over-the-top gore, campy acting, and dim cinematography may be part of Hatchet's self-described old-school ethos, but irony alone can't sustain a horror film." On Metacritic, the film has a weighted average score of 57 out of 100, based on 8 reviews.

=== Home media ===
Hatchet was released on DVD on December 18, 2007. There are two versions available, the original theatrical cut and the unrated director's cut, the latter having an extra minute of gore. The film reportedly made $6 million in U.S. rentals during its first three weeks of release. The film has sold over 597,022 units in North America, translating into $8,262,721. The film was released on Blu-ray on September 7, 2010.

== Legacy ==
In November 2008, Anchor Bay Entertainment released a teaser poster for a sequel, Hatchet II, and Green returned to direct the film. Hodder returned as Victor Crowley/Mr. Crowley, with Todd returning as Reverend Zombie, and Buechler as Jack Cracker. New in the cast were R.A. Mihailoff and Danielle Harris, who took over the role of Marybeth.

Hatchet II follows Marybeth as she escapes from Victor Crowley's clutches, learns the truth about his curse, and heads back into the haunted New Orleans swamp to seek revenge for her family and to kill Crowley once and for all. Green confirmed on March 29, 2010, the extension of the series to two more sequels, and has expressed interest.

Hatchet III has the police finding the bodies of the first two films' victims on the island and Marybeth is the chief suspect. Meanwhile, a reporter bent on the belief of Victor Crowley takes a deputy and Marybeth out to prove the legend.

Victor Crowley, the fourth installment, was released in August 2017.
