= Parry Shen =

American actor

- Born: June 26, 1973 (age 53); Queens, New York, U.S.
- Other name: Parry Allen
- Education: Archbishop Molloy High School; University at Buffalo
- Years active: 1997–present
- Spouse: Kim Shen (m. 2002)
- Children: 2
- Website: parryshen.com

Parry Shen (born June 26, 1973) is an American actor, author, screenwriter, and producer. Shen's first major acting role was in Better Luck Tomorrow as Ben Manibag, the film's leading character. He also starred in another Asian American film, Surrogate Valentine. He has since starred in the horror film Hatchet and its sequels Hatchet II, Hatchet III, and Victor Crowley. He had a recurring role as Tyler Li in the television series Tru Calling. He has portrayed the role of Brad Cooper on General Hospital since 2013.

He is also known for his voice acting in the video games Sleeping Dogs, Mortal Kombat X, and Mortal Kombat 1.

== Early life ==
Shen was born June 26, 1973, in New York City, in the borough of Queens. He went to Archbishop Molloy High School, then an all-boys (but now co-educational) Roman Catholic school in Briarwood, in Queens, New York, and at the University at Buffalo. His mother is from Hong Kong. His father is from Shanghai. When he moved to California, he worked as a dorm parent at Villanova Preparatory School, a private college preparatory school in Ojai. Shen is of Chinese descent and can speak Cantonese.

== Career ==
=== Acting ===
Shen is best known as the lead character, Ben Manibag, in Justin Lin's seminal Asian American film, Better Luck Tomorrow (2002). Shen was also a main part of the cast of Hatchet, in which he also returned for Adam Green's Hatchet II and Hatchet III. Shen has appeared in Ed Decter's The New Guy (2002) opposite DJ Qualls and Zooey Deschanel (as Glen). Shen also appears as the lead husband character, Luke, in Richard Wong's Yes We're Open opposite Lynn Chen and in Dave Boyle's Surrogate Valentine (2011) as Bradley, Pearry Reginald Teo's The Gene Generation (as Jackie, the brother of Bai Ling's character), and Eric Shapiro's Rule of 3 (2008) (as David).

Shen has appeared on the TV shows NCIS: Los Angeles (as Ty), MADTv (as Chin-Hwa Dak), Criminal Minds (as Bobby Kim), Brothers & Sisters (as Dan Silk), Veronica Mars (as Hsiang 'Charleston' Chu), Thief (as Billy 'Shrimp Boy' Kwan), Without a Trace (as Steven Park), Tru Calling (as Tyler Li), Holliston (as Trent), NCIS (TV series) (as Ben Richmond), Sabrina the Teenage Witch (as Seth), Party of Five (as Kyle), Cousin Skeeter (as Billy Blowfield), Chicago Hope (as Harry Lensky), The King of Queens (as stockboy), Malibu, CA (as Kip), Beverly Hills 90210 (as Staffer), Suddenly Susan (as Robert), Caroline in the City (as Tim), and Buffy the Vampire Slayer (as student). Shen also played various characters on the TV series Asia Street Comedy (2004).

Shen also voices the character Takeda Takahashi in "Mortal Kombat X" (2015), Winston Chu in Square Enix's Sleeping Dogs (2012), Mogu Zai in Blizzard's World of Warcraft: Mists of Pandaria (2012), and Tang/Privateer/Thug in Far Cry 3 (2012).

On May 6, 2013, Shen debuted in the recurring role of Brad Cooper on General Hospital. He also appeared in the feature film Automation.

=== Author ===
Shen is Managing Editor of Secret Identities: The Asian American Superhero Anthology, published by The New Press in April 2009. Its sequel, Shattered: The Asian American Comics Anthology, was published in November 2012.

=== Screenwriting and producing ===
Shen has written and produced the feature film entitled Unidentified (2013), directed by Jason Richard Miller.

=== Speaking engagements ===
Shen speaks at numerous universities about the entertainment industry and shares his experiences as an Asian American in the media.

== Personal life ==
Shen has been married to his wife, Kim, since August 2, 2002, and they have two daughters.

== Filmography ==
=== Film ===
Year	Title	Role	Notes
1997	Starship Troopers	Student	Action-Adventure film directed by Paul Verhoeven; Uncredited
1997	Shrieker	David	Horror film directed by Victoria Sloan^{1}; Credited as Parry Allen
2000	Game Day	Ali	Comedy film directed and written by Marshall V. Davidson
2002	Better Luck Tomorrow	Ben Manibag	Crime-drama film directed by Justin Lin
2002	The New Guy	Glen	Comedy film directed by Ed Decter
2004	Dead Scared	Tim	Comedy-horror film directed and written by Rolfe Kanefsky; Originally known as The Hazing in Spain
2004	The Perfect Party	Peter	Horror film directed and written by James Huang
2004	The Deviants	Jerry	Comedy-romantic film directed by Reid Waterer
2004	First Daughter	Rally Leader	Comedy-romantic film directed by Forest Whitaker
2005	Passages	Frank	Short film directed by Ted Chung
2006	Hatchet	Shawn	Slasher film directed by Adam Green
2007	Finishing the Game	Robert Chang	Mockumentary film directed by Justin Lin; In deleted scenes
2007	The Gene Generation	Jackie	Biopunk science fiction film directed by Pearry Reginald Teo
2008	Rule of 3	David	Thriller film directed by Eric Shapiro
2008	Fairy Tale Police	Officer Pappas	Short film directed and written by Adam Green
2009	The TiVo	James	Short-fantasy film directed and written by Adam Green
2010	Hatchet II	Justin	Slasher film directed and written by Adam Green
2011	Surrogate Valentine	Bradley	Comedy film directed by Dave Boyle and co-written by Boyle, Joel Clark, & Goh Nakamura
2012	Yes, We're Open	Luke	Romantic film directed by Richard Wong
2013	Starting from Scratch	Parry	Romantic film directed and written by James Huang
2013	#1 Serial Killer	Murder Victim	Horror film directed by Stanley Yung
2013	Hatchet III	Andrew	Slasher film directed by BJ McDonnell
2013	Snowpiercer	Voice Actor (voice)	Action-drama film directed by Joon-ho Bong and co-written by Bong & Kelly Masterson
2013	Unidentified	Jeremy	Science fiction film directed by Jason Richard Miller and co-written by Miller, Eddie Mui, & Shen
2017	Swing State	Ryan Pollard	Romantic-musical film directed and written by Jonathan Sheldon
2017	Victor Crowley	Andrew	Horror film directed and written by Adam Green
2019	Automation	Alan	Science fiction film directed by Garo Setian

=== Television ===
Year	Title	Role	Notes
1997	Caroline in the City	Tim	Episode: "Caroline and the Cold Sesame Noodles"
1998	Buffy the Vampire Slayer	Student	Episode: "Innocence"
1998	Suddenly Susan	Robert	Episode: "Birds Do It, Bees Do It, Even Some of These Do It"
1998	Beverly Hills, 90210	Staffer	Episode: "Budget Cuts"
1998	Malibu, CA	Kip	Episode: "Welcome to Malibu" (Pilot)
1998	The King of Queens	Stockboy	Episode: "Supermarket Story"
1999	Chicago Hope	Harry Lensky	Episode: "Big Hand for the Little Lady"
1999	Cousin Skeeter	Billy Blowfeld	Episode: "Sideshow Skeeter"
1999	Party of Five	Kyle	Episode: "I'll Show You Mine"
2000	The Wild Thornberrys	Dog (voice)	Episode: "Dragon Me Along"
2000	The Privateers	Parrot	Television film
2000	Damaged Goods	Josh	Television film
2001	An American Town	Sophomore	Television film
2002	Sabrina the Teenage Witch	Seth	Episode: "Cloud Ten"
2004	NCIS	Ben Richmond	Episode: "Eye Spy"
2004	Asia Street Comedy	Various	[unknown episodes]
2005	Tru Calling	Tyler Li	Recurring role
2005	Attack of the Sabretooth	Robbie	Television film
2005	The Poseidon Adventure	Enlisted Man	Television film
2005	Without a Trace	Steven Park	Episode: "Honor Bound"
2006	Jane Doe: Yes, I Remember It Well	UFAP	Television film
2006	Thief	Billy "Shrimp Boy" Kwan	Recurring role
2006	Veronica Mars	Hsiang "Charleston" Chu	Episode: "Charlie Don't Surf"
2007	Brothers & Sisters	Dan Silk	Episodes: "The Other Walker", "Three Parties"
2007	Criminal Minds	Bobby Kim	Episode: "True Night"
2008	Mad TV	Chin-Hwa Dak	Episode: "Episode 13"
2010–2014	NCIS: Los Angeles	Ty	Recurring role
2012	Holliston	Trent	Episode: "Camera Rental"
2013–present	General Hospital	Brad Cooper	Recurring role
2017	Dimension 404	Animator	Episode: "Chronos"
2017	Doc McStuffins	Shinji	Episode: "First Responders to the Rescue"
2022	Kung Fu Panda: The Dragon Knight	Weimin (voice)	3 episodes
2024	Secret Level	MC (young, voice)	Episode: "Sifu: It Takes a Life"

=== Video games ===
Year	Title	Role	Notes
2009	Wet	Zhi	
2012	Sleeping Dogs	Winston Chu	
2012	World of Warcraft: Mists of Pandaria	Zian of the Endless Shadow	
2013	Far Cry 3	Additional Voices	
2015	Mortal Kombat X	Takeda Takahashi	
2016	Lego Marvel Avengers	Iron Legion	
2016	The Walking Dead: Michonne	Zachary	
2023	Mortal Kombat 1	Takeda Takahashi	
