= Spiral (2007 film) =

- Promotional poster for the film
- Directed by: Joel David Moore; Adam Green
- Written by: Jeremy Boreing; Joel David Moore
- Produced by: Cory Neal; Jeremy Boreing
- Starring: Amber Tamblyn; Joel David Moore; Zachary Levi; Tricia Helfer
- Cinematography: Will Barratt
- Edited by: Cory Livingston
- Music by: Todd Caldwell; Michael "Fish" Herring
- Production companies: Coattails Entertainment; ArieScope Pictures
- Distributed by: Anchor Bay Entertainment
- Release dates: January 27, 2007 (Santa Barbara Film Festival); February 8, 2008 (United States)
- Running time: 90 minutes
- Country: United States
- Language: English
- Box office: $3,072 (US)

Spiral is a 2007 American psychological thriller directed by Joel David Moore and Adam Green, and starring Moore, Amber Tamblyn, Zachary Levi, and Tricia Helfer. The original screenplay for the film was written by Moore and Jeremy Danial Boreing.

Spiral was an Official Selection and was awarded the "Gold Vision" Award at the 22nd Annual Santa Barbara International Film Festival in 2007. The "Gold Vision" Award is given for the "most innovative and unique film with an inspiring and groundbreaking vision."

== Plot ==
The story follows lonely introvert Mason, a telesales insurance company worker by day and talented painter as well as a lover of classic jazz by night. His only friend is his boss, Berkeley (Levi), who keeps an eye on him and humors his bizarre behavior. When awkward Mason meets social Amber, a new co-worker, he begins to come out of himself, and reveals the depth and darkness of his mind.

== Cast ==
- Joel David Moore as Mason
- Amber Tamblyn as Amber
- Zachary Levi as Berkeley
- Tricia Helfer as Sasha
- David Muller as Will
- Annie Neal as Diana

== Production ==
Spiral was filmed in Portland, Oregon.

== Soundtrack ==
Because jazz is such an important part of the plot, Joel David Moore wanted to use a completely original score. It was composed by Todd Caldwell and Michael Herring. It features Brad Leali on alto sax, Jay DaVersa on trumpet, Royce Chambers playing tenor and soprano sax, Todd's father Don Caldwell on tenor sax, and Ted Greenberg on drums.

== Reception ==
=== Box office ===
The film grossed $3,072 in the United States.

=== Critical ===
The film received mixed reviews from critics. As of February 17, 2008, the review aggregator Rotten Tomatoes reported that 60% of critics gave the film positive reviews, based on 5 reviews. Metacritic reported the film had a weighted average score of 40 out of 100, based on 4 reviews.
