= Chillerama =

2011 American horror comedy film

- Directed by: Adam Rifkin; Tim Sullivan; Adam Green; Joe Lynch
- Written by: Adam Rifkin; Tim Sullivan; Adam Green; Joe Lynch
- Produced by: Jason Richard Miller; Andrew Mysko; Cory Neal
- Cinematography: Will Barratt
- Edited by: Ed Marx; Gavin Heffernan; Matthew Brulotte
- Music by: Andy Garfield; Patrick Copeland; Bear McCreary
- Production company: ArieScope Pictures
- Distributed by: Image Entertainment
- Release dates: August 27, 2011 (FrightFest); November 29, 2011
- Running time: 120 minutes
- Country: United States
- Language: English

Chillerama is a 2011 American horror comedy anthology film consisting of four stories (or segments) that take place at a drive-in theater playing monster movies. Each segment is a homage to a different genre and style.

The first is "Wadzilla" and was directed and written by Adam Rifkin spoofing 1950s monster movies. The second segment is "I Was a Teenage Werebear" and was directed and written by Tim Sullivan which parodies Rebel Without a Cause and Grease and is set in the American 1960s. The third is called "The Diary of Anne Frankenstein" and was directed and written by Adam Green and spoofs Frankenstein and The Diary of Anne Frank. The last segment is "Zom-B-Movie", a spoof of zombie films, and was directed and written by Joe Lynch.

Filming took place in late 2010 and premiered FrightFest on August 27, 2011. On September 29, 2011, it was released to video on demand and on DVD and Blu-ray on November 29, 2011.

== Development ==
Adam Rifkin and Tim Sullivan met while working on Detroit Rock City and quickly discovered they shared a mutual love of horror, monster and drive-in B-movies, so they began developing an idea to make an anthology called Famous Monsters of Filmland, loosely based on the magazine they had grown up reading, and with each short dedicated to a different era in film.

First they came up with names and mock-up posters for each of the mini-features: The Diary of Anne Frankenstein (1940s), I Was a Teenage Vampire (1950s) Zombie Drive-In (1960s) and Werewolf of Alcatraz (1970s). A deal with Famous Monsters magazine fell through, so it was pitched as a weekly MTV series to be hosted by KISS frontman Gene Simmons, but reality television was beginning to dominate American households, so the project was shelved.

A few years later, Rifkin and Sullivan met with directors Adam Green and Joe Lynch at Rainbow Bar and Grill, and the idea resurfaced. Soon the quartet decided to make Chillerama as an independently produced film, with Green's studio, ArieScope Pictures, serving as the headquarters of operations. Due to estimated budgetary constraints, Werewolf of Alcatraz was dropped and replaced with Wadzilla; I Was a Teenage Vampire was changed to Teenage Werebear at Lynch's behest; Zombie Drive-In became Zom-B-Movie; and a fifth short called Deathication was added to the drive-in sequence to mislead viewers.

== "Wadzilla" ==
=== Premise ===
"Wadzilla" is a spoof on 1950s monster movies and is about "a guy that goes to get his sperm count raised, and it creates one big sperm that attacks New York City".

=== Cast ===
- Adam Rifkin as Miles Munson
- Sarah Mutch as Louise
- Owen Benjamin as Larry
- Ray Wise as Dr. Weems
- Eric Roberts as General Bukkake
- Lin Shaye as Baglady
- Tania Raymonde as Zelda
- Tracy Dawson as Molly
- Summer Altice as Andie Sumner
- Olivia Taylor Dudley as Nurse Unger
- Ron Jeremy as Capitan Fatso

=== Production ===
It was directed and written by Adam Rifkin, who also stars in the film. Special effects were done by The Chiodo Brothers.

== "I Was a Teenage Werebear" ==
=== Premise ===
"I Was a Teenage Werebear" is a beach musical and a spoof of films like Rebel Without a Cause, Grease and The Lost Boys. It is set in 1962 and is about a "closeted kid who meets these other closeted kids, who when aroused turn into leather daddy werebears".

=== Cast ===
- Sean Paul Lockhart as Ricky
- Anton Troy as Talon
- Gabby West as Peggy Lou
- Adam Robitel as Butch
- Lin Shaye as Nurse Maleva
- Ron Jeremy as Playbear
- Tim Sullivan as Coach Tuffman

=== Production ===
It was directed and written by Tim Sullivan. Sullivan, who is openly gay, included some gay culture in the segment. The word bear is slang for "big hairy burly men" in the gay community. It includes five original rock 'n roll songs performed by the actors.

Casting was difficult as straight actors declined the role and many gay actors were not allowed to do the role by their representatives. Former porn star Sean Paul Lockhart (Brent Corrigan) was cast as the lead role. On November 5, 2010, a scene was filmed on the beach of Sycamore Cove near Malibu. Robert Pendergraft provided the practical effects.

=== Soundtrack ===
Chillerama Presents: Tim Sullivan's I Was a Teenage Werebear was released on February 14, 2012, through BSX Records. The album includes all of the songs from the segment, as well as Room For All (Everybody's Gay), a production number which was cut out of the version of the film included in Chillerama, and two versions of the titular Chillerama song by Psycho Charger.

Chillerama Presents: Tim Sullivan's I Was a Teenage Werebear

Soundtrack album by various artists
- Released: 2011
- Genre: Soundtrack
- Length: 43:21
- Label: BSX Records

All tracks are written by Tim Sullivan & Patrick Copeland except where otherwise noted.

No.	Title	Length
1.	"Chillerama" (written and performed by Psycho Charger)	3:53
2.	"Don't Look Away" (performed by Gabby West & Sean Paul Lockhart)	2:12
3.	"Purge" (performed by Sean Paul Lockhart)	1:48
4.	"Love Bit Me on the Ass" (performed by Anton Troy and Sean Paul Lockhart)	1:44
5.	"Do the Werebear (And Let the Werebear Do You)" (performed by Anton Troy, Tom Colby & Chris Staviski)	2:57
6.	"Room for All" (performed by Sean Paul Lockhart)	1:57
7.	"Where Were You When I Was 17?" (written and performed by Bobby Vinton)	2:50
8.	"Undercover Lover" (performed by Briana Nadeau; written by Briana Nadeau & Adam Williams)	3:30
9.	"Sexy Ways" (written and performed by Robert Vinton)	3:12
10.	"I'm Gonna Make Him Mine" (performed by Briana Nadeau; written by Briana Nadeau & Ryan Jennings)	2:49
11.	"I Was a Teenage Werebear Instrumental Suite"	11:36
12.	"Chillerama Drive In – Freak Out Remix" (Written and performed by Psycho Charger)	4:19
Total length:		43:21

=== eBay controversy ===
The offending still

In February 2012, Sullivan began selling copies of the CD soundtrack for I Was a Teenage Werebear on eBay, and as a bonus he included an autographed 8x10 still of Lockhart clad in a pair of red briefs. After some auctions had ended, eBay pulled down the listing and canceled all finalized orders of the album and 8x10. Initially, Sullivan thought that it was a mistake, but after speaking to people in eBay's safety & trust department, he was told that the auction included a photo of a man with "engorged genitalia" which they deemed "sexually and morally offensive". Sullivan was initially told that he could re-list the auction, but only in the adults-only section of the site that features pornographic material. After two failed appeals to reinstate the auction, eBay told him that he could not relist it at all, even without the offending photo.

== "The Diary of Anne Frankenstein" ==
=== Premise ===
"The Diary of Anne Frankenstein" is a black and white film about Hitler "trying to create the perfect killing machine to win the war".

=== Cast ===
- Joel David Moore as Adolf Hitler
- Kristina Klebe as Eva Braun
- Kane Hodder as Meshugannah
- Jim Ward as Mr. Frank
- Silvia Moore as Mrs. Frank
- Laura Ortiz as Margot Frank
- Tim Sullivan as a gravedigger

=== Production ===
Adam Green came into Chillerama with the title of this short already established, but was encouraged to make it his own. Green's first decision, given the delicate nature of the subject matter, was that the story had to be over-the-top and would have to "make a clown out of Hitler" to ensure no one would deem it offensive. His second decision was casting Joel Moore in that role. "If Joel Moore is Hitler", Green said, "there is absolutely no way you can take this seriously for a second."

Green then decided to hire a cast of German-speaking actors and, to make Hitler look like even more of a fool, have Moore speak gibberish throughout the film. Green's idea was to have Moore sound slightly convincing as the film began to give audiences who don't comprehend German the idea that he was actually speaking the language, but as the film progresses "his German gets worse and worse", ultimately devolving into total gibberish and random words and phrases, such as "Oshkosh B'gosh" and "Boba Fett". Actress Kristina Klebe and her mother translated Green's script into German, and the cast rehearsed it two ways: first in English to get the rhythms down, and then in German as it would be shot. For a few key moments, Moore was taught to speak German phrases, albeit not the ones that are subtitled on the screen. For example, during his song "I Don't Want to Rule the World", instead of the titular line Moore sings, "Ich habe Würmer in meinem Schwanz", which means, "I have worms in my penis".

== "Zom-B-Movie" ==
=== Premise ===
"Zom-B-Movie" is a spoof of 1970s and 1980s zombie films and was directed and written by Joe Lynch.

=== Cast ===
- Richard Riehle as Cecil Kaufman
- Corey Jones as Toby
- Kaili Thorne as Mayna
- Brendan McCreary as Ryan
- Ward Roberts as Miller
- Laura Ortiz as Desi
- A. J. Bowen as Rick Marshall
- Briana Mackay as Deb Marshall

=== Soundtrack ===
Chillerama Presents Zom-B-Movie was released on November 16, 2011, through BSX Records. The album includes Bear McCreary's complete score, as well as I Don't Want to Die a Virgin by star Brendan McCreary's band Young Beautiful in a Hurry.

Chillerama Presents Zom-B-Movie

Soundtrack album by Bear McCreary, Young Beautiful in a Hurry, Joshua Silverstein
- Released: 2011
- Genre: Soundtrack
- Length: 60:48
- Label: BSX Records

All tracks are written by Bear McCreary except where otherwise noted.

No.	Title	Length
1.	"I Don't Want to Die a Virgin" (performed by Young Beautiful in a Hurry; written by Brendan McCreary)	4:34
2.	"Chillerama Main Title / Floyd's Bean Bag"	3:06
3.	"Ryan to the Rescue"	2:33
4.	"Fernando Phagabeefy"	3:07
5.	"Deathication"	3:07
6.	"The Kiss"	0:57
7.	"Cecil and Orson"	1:48
8.	"Tainted Popcorn"	2:09
9.	"The Final Reel"	2:38
10.	"Rosebud Motherfucker"	4:00
11.	"One Hell of a Show"	1:41
12.	"Fugue in Z Minor"	2:58
13.	"Rosemary’s Picnic Table"	3:05
14.	"Seducing Ryan"	0:34
15.	"Zom-B-Movie Suite"	4:48
16.	"Deathication (Movement Number Two)" (Lyrics by Raya Yarbrough; featuring Joshua Silverstein, vocals)	19:06
Total length:		60:48

== Release and reception ==
Chillerama was distributed by Image Entertainment in the United States. The segment "The Diary of Anne Frankenstein" was shown at the 2010 London FrightFest Film Festival to a positive response from the audience. The film had a full premiere at London FrightFest on August 27, 2011. The film was released in fourteen U.S. cities called the Chillerama Roadshow Tour from September 15, 2011, to October 29, 2011. It was released on video on demand on September 29, 2011, and on DVD and Blu-ray on November 29, 2011.

On the review aggregator website Rotten Tomatoes, 33% of 6 critics' reviews are positive, with an average rating of 5.3/10. Evan Dickson writing for horror news website Bloody Disgusting gave the film a score of four out of ten, with his least favorite segment being "I Was a Teenage Werebear".
