= B. J. McDonnell =

B. J. McDonnell is an American film director. He directed Studio 666 (2022), Hatchet III (2013) and The Repentless Killogy (2019).
