= Grace (2009 film) =

2009 film by Paul Solet

- Directed by: Paul Solet
- Written by: Paul Solet
- Produced by: Kevin DeWalt; Cory Neal; Adam Green; Ingo Volkammer
- Starring: Jordan Ladd; Gabrielle Rose; Stephen Park
- Cinematography: Zorn Popovic
- Edited by: John Coniglio; Darren Navarro
- Music by: Austin Wintory
- Production companies: Indigomotion; ArieScope Pictures; Dark Eye Entertainment; Leomax Entertainment; Minds Eye Entertainment
- Distributed by: Anchor Bay Entertainment; Dark Eye Entertainment
- Release dates: January 16, 2009 (Sundance); August 14, 2009 (United States)
- Running time: 85 minutes
- Country: United States
- Language: English

Grace is a 2009 American horror film written and directed by Paul Solet, based on the 2006 short film of the same name. The short film was used to obtain the feature version's funding.

Michael Matheson (Stephen Park) and his pregnant wife Madeline Matheson (Jordan Ladd) are involved in a car accident. Michael passes away, and doctors tell Madeline that her unborn child is dead as well. Madeline, desperate after trying to have a child for years, decides to carry her baby to term anyway. The child, a girl, initially appears stillborn. After a while, though, she seems to revive, and Madeline names her "Grace". Soon it becomes clear that something is wrong with the baby. She develops smells that are not healthy, attracts flies, and craves blood.

== Plot ==
After two unsuccessful attempts to have a child, Michael and Madeline Matheson succeed the third time. They consult Madeline's midwife ex-girlfriend, Patricia, to function an unorthodox delivery.

One night, Michael and the unborn baby are killed in a car accident. Madeline does not want to begin induction of labor, so Patricia allows Madeline to carry to term. Although initially stillborn, the baby is miraculously alive. Madeline names the baby Grace.

Back at Madeline's house, Grace attracts flies because of her putrid scent. Madeline also realizes that Grace can't digest breast milk as she continues to vomit. While Madeline nurses a crying Grace, she realizes that the child is feeding from her breast that is bleeding.

Meanwhile, Vivian, Michael's domineering mother, wants to visit Grace, but Madeline does not want to answer her calls. She visits Dr. Richard Sohn, an obstetrician that she recommended. She convinces him to visit Madeline while looking to collect proof that she is an unfit mother.

Madeline continues to nurse Grace with her blood. Her blood loss weakens her to the point that she allows Dr. Sohn into her house. He hears Grace cry weakly and starts to her crib. Afraid that he will take Grace away, Madeline kills Dr. Sohn.

Vivian comes the moment Madeline finishes draining Dr. Sohn's blood into a baby bottle. After exploring the house, Vivian agrees to leave, but instead finds Grace in her crib, and the bottle of blood broken on the floor. Madeline tries to pursue her, but Vivian is able to grab Grace and flee, discovering Dr. Sohn's body in the process. Vivian arms herself with a hammer; Madeline confronts her, and Vivian beats Madeline unconscious, but not before Madeline rips out part of Vivian's throat with her teeth. They are discovered by Patricia, who sees Grace drinking from Vivian's blood.

Some time later, Patricia is driving a motor home through the desert. She pulls over and goes to the back to check on Madeline, who's nursing Grace. She asserts that as long as Madeline keeps eating the proper diet, they can continue feeding and raising Grace. Madeline informs her that Grace has begun teething, revealing her mutilated breast.

== Cast ==
- Jordan Ladd as Madeline Matheson
- Gabrielle Rose as Vivian Matheson
- Samantha Ferris as Dr. Patricia Lang
- Malcolm Stewart as Dr. Richard Sohn
- Serge Houde as Henry Matheson
- Stephen Park as Michael Matheson

== Production ==
Shooting began on April 21, 2008, in Regina, Saskatchewan, Canada.

== Release ==
Grace premiered at the 2009 Sundance Film Festival. It was released in the US on August 14, 2009, by Anchor Bay Entertainment and Dark Eye Entertainment.

== Reception ==
Rotten Tomatoes, a review aggregator, reports that 73% of 33 surveyed critics gave the film a positive review; the average rating is 6.63/10 and the site's consensus reads: "Though not entirely effective as a conventional horror flick, Grace is still a graphic, disturbing, and artful exploration of twisted maternal instinct". Metacritic rated it 52 out of 100 based on six reviews.

Jon Anderson of Variety called it "a satirical creepfest that mines modern motherhood for all its latent terrors". Doris Toumarkine of The Hollywood Reporter wrote, "Grace whimpers a bit like Rosemary's Baby and gurgles occasionally like The Exorcist, but the video look and bare-bones craftsmanship all scream B movie." Mike Hale of The New York Times described it as a "chilly and slow-moving horror film, which plays with ideas of mother love, obsessive child rearing and liberal spinelessness, adding a helping of trendy vampirism." Michael Ordona of the Los Angeles Times called it "a horrifying meditation on the unbreakable union of mother and child". S. James Snyder of Time Out New York rated it 1/5 stars and wrote, "Paul Solet's gyno-horror flick is certainly twisted but only slightly unnerving; the movie is about as gripping as one might expect given that its infant monster is both mute and cradle-bound." Ed Gonzalez of The Village Voice wrote that Grace is creepy but questioned the point of the film.
