= It's a Mall World =

It's a Mall World is an original short comedy series made exclusively for American Eagle Outfitters.

== Plot ==
The series explores the lives and relationships of two record store employees, an "object of perfection" greeter at the American Eagle store across the way, as well as a slightly psychotic girl who works in a lingerie store, and a bad-boy poseur from the requisite mall juice bar.

== Production ==
The 13 episode series was written by Adam Green, directed by Milo Ventimiglia, and produced by Russ Cundiff for Divide Pictures.

The cast featured actors including Sam Huntington, Dianna Agron, Amanda Loncar, Deon Richmond and Eddie Hargitay. Agron described her character Harper as the "quintessential all-American girl", saying the story and character friendships in the series were wholesome.

== Release ==
The mini-episodes premiered August 1, 2007 and ran during episodes of MTV's The Real World. It became more popular on the internet at AE.com after its original run, and "set the standard for original entertainment content for retailers".
