= Fearnet =

American horror cable network

- Country: United States
- Broadcast area: Nationwide

Programming
- Language: English

Ownership
- Owner: NBCUniversal

History
- Launched: October 31, 2006; 19 years ago (VOD); October 31, 2010; 15 years ago (linear channel)
- Closed: July 30, 2014; 12 years ago

Links
- Website: Archived official website at the Wayback Machine (archive index)

Fearnet was an American digital cable television network, website and video on demand service owned by Comcast. The network specialized in horror entertainment programming through a mix of acquired and original series, and feature films.

== Background and platforms ==
=== Fearnet on Demand ===
Fearnet launched on October 31, 2006 as a video on demand service, Fearnet On Demand. It was originally operated as a joint venture between Comcast, Lions Gate Entertainment, and Sony Pictures Entertainment. The on-demand service featured full-length horror, thriller, and suspense films as well as shorts, trailers, interviews, and behind-the-scenes featurettes. It was available to subscribers of Comcast, Cox Communications, Verizon FiOS, AT&T U-verse, Insight Communications, Bresnan Communications, Guadalupe Valley Systems, Buckeye CableSystem, Time Warner Cable, Wave Broadband, Bright House Networks, and CenturyLink.

=== Fearnet cable channel ===
Fearnet launched as a linear cable channel on October 31, 2010. The network was originally scheduled to launch four weeks earlier on October 1, but the date was pushed back as Fearnet was in the midst of carriage negotiations with cable providers to carry the linear channel. The Fearnet channel was available through Comcast (in select markets), Cox Communications, Time Warner Cable, Verizon FiOS, Bright House Networks, and CenturyLink. The network aired over 350 full-length feature films annually, as well as popular series (such as Tales from the Crypt and Reaper) and original content (such as Holliston) and the weekend program block called "Funhouse".

In September 2012, Fearnet became the first television network to offer Dynamic Ad Insertion (DAI), technology which decreases integration time from four weeks to as few as three days, and allows advertisers to refresh creative mid-campaign and track impressions on a daily basis.

=== Fearnet.com ===
The Fearnet website featured thriller, suspense, and horror films available for streaming (with available content updated each week); other videos including movie trailers and shorts; daily news and reviews that covered all aspects of the genre; and sweepstakes, chats, and forums. The website had over 270,000 registered users.

=== Leadership and ownership changes ===
In 2010, Peter Block (who launched the top-grossing Saw horror film franchise, and produced several other blockbuster horror and thriller films including Hostel, Cabin Fever, Open Water, and House at the End of the Street) was named president and general manager of Fearnet, replacing Diane Robina. In addition to his duties at Fearnet, Block continued to run his production company A Bigger Boat.

=== Merger with Chiller ===
On April 14, 2014, Comcast purchased Lions Gate Entertainment and Sony Pictures Entertainment's stakes in Fearnet to acquire full ownership of the channel. Comcast planned to fold Fearnet's programming into its existing horror- and thriller-focused network Chiller (owned by the company's NBCUniversal Cable unit) and move some of Fearnet's programming to Syfy. Fearnet ceased operations on July 30, 2014 shortly after midnight, after an airing of House of 1000 Corpses

== Programming ==
=== Original programming ===
On April 3, 2012, Fearnet premiered their only original series, Holliston, a horror/comedy series starring real-life filmmakers Adam Green and Joe Lynch as two college graduates chasing the dream of becoming successful horror filmmakers while struggling to make ends meet through their jobs at a Boston public-access cable channel. The series was renewed for a second season which aired in 2013.

=== Funhouse ===
In August 2012, Fearnet debuted a two-hour program block on Saturday and Sunday mornings called "Funhouse", featuring reruns of science-fiction and horror series aimed at children, including: The Real Ghostbusters, Tales from the Cryptkeeper, Eerie, Indiana, and Dark Oracle.
