= Adam Green (filmmaker) =

American actor and filmmaker (born 1975)

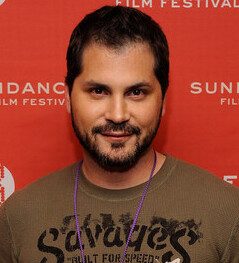
- Green at the 2010 Sundance Film Festival
- Born: 1975 (age 50–51); Holliston, Massachusetts, United States
- Education: Hofstra University
- Occupations: Film director, screenwriter, actor, musician
- Years active: 1996–present
- Notable work: Hatchet (2006); Frozen (2010); Holliston (2012–2015)
- Spouses: Rileah Vanderbilt (m. 2010; div. 2014) Natasha Marshall (m. 2022)
- Website: ariescope.com

Adam Green (born March 31, 1975) is an American actor, filmmaker and musician, best known for his work in horror and comedy films, including the Hatchet franchise, 2010's Frozen, and the television series Holliston. He was also the lead singer for the hard rock and metal band Haddonfield.

== Early life ==
Green was born and raised in Holliston, Massachusetts. After finishing high school in 1993, he left for New York to study film and television production at Hofstra University, where he graduated in 1997 with a Bachelor of Science.

After finishing studies, Green worked in Boston making local commercials for Time Warner Cable, where he met his future collaborator Will Barratt. In 1998, the duo founded production company ArieScope Pictures and the following year made their first feature-length film: the semi-biographic comedy Coffee & Donuts. Green starred in the lead role, while other parts were played by Steven C. DeWitt Jr., Katie Bove and Jeff Davison. This amateur production has not been widely released.

== Career ==
Spiral (2007) is Joel David Moore's and JD Boreing's thriller, which Green co-directed. The story follows an isolated telemarketer (Moore), who befriends a new co-worker and then struggles with troubling past feelings, threatening his personal dignity. Critics hailed Spiral as "nothing short of brilliant" and "the closest thing you'll get to Hitchcock in this day and age". The film won Gold Vision Award at the 2008 Santa Barbara Film Festival.

Green and Joe Lynch's free weekly filmmaker interview and film commentary podcast launched on GeekNation in May 2013. The name references creators' sitcom Holliston, along with other inside jokes in the content. The talk show was recommended by Entertainment Weekly under the headline "20 podcasts you need to hear in 2015" (January 9, 2015; print issue #1345)

=== Hatchet franchise ===
Hatchet (2006) is the first feature of Green's successful franchise. The horror comedy tributes old-school American slashers and follows a group of tourists, who take a swamp boat ride and wind up pursued by the ghost of local legend Victor Crowley. Theatrically released on September 7, 2007, the film was relatively well received by some critics and earned a worldwide horror cult following, resulting in three sequels for 2010, 2013, and 2017.

Hatchet II (2010) is franchise's sequel, starring Kane Hodder and Danielle Harris. Green eagerly promoted his film by pre-advertising (Anchor Bay, MySpace), in press (Creation Entertainment, Comic-Con, Frozen events) and with credits (Adam Green's Hatchet II). Filmed in the beginning of the year, sequel premiered at the London FrightFest Film Festival 2010. The theatrical release made headlines when distributor Dark Sky agreed with AMC Theatres to bypass MPAA ratings' board and on October 1, 2010, released the unrated Hatchet II, which got revoked within hours. The officially reported reason by AMC was poor performance, but Green has alluded to controversy with MPAA. Metacritic rated the film 49/100 based on 11 reviews. Rotten Tomatoes reports a 36% approval rating and an average score of 4.2/10 based on 33 reviews; the site's consensus reads: "Funnier and more gleefully gory than most slasher sequels, Hatchet II aims for so-bad-it's-good territory, but can't quite hack it."

Hatchet III (2013) is the third feature of Green's franchise, directed by BJ McDonnell and starring Kane Hodder, Danielle Harris, Derek Mears. Production began in April 2012, and the film was released in United States theaters and VOD on June 14, 2013. In press announcements, Green passionately assured fans, disappointed about the substitute director, that he personally oversaw all development. Though Green has clearly stated that Hatchet III is meant to be the end of the story, and that he always had set out to make a trilogy, he has also speculated that this is only the ending to his story of Marybeth and Victor Crowley and that fans could potentially see more Hatchet films in the future with a different storyline, different characters, and (possibly) different storytellers behind the camera. Rotten Tomatoes gave the film a 55% approval rating based on 22 reviews, and Metacritic rated it 25/100 based on eight reviews. As part of Green's three-day fundraiser to benefit victims of the Boston Marathon bombing, all three films were shown in Hatchet Marathon on May 30, 2013, and filmmaker made a donation to One Fund Boston.

Victor Crowley (2017) is the fourth feature in Green's Hatchet franchise. Written and directed by Green, the film was produced in secret over 2015 and 2016, with Green unveiling the finished film as a complete surprise during a "10th Anniversary Event" for Hatchet at the Arclight Hollywood where it received two standing ovations on August 22, 2017. The film immediately premiered in London four days later (August 26, 2017) as part of UK FrightFest, where it received yet another standing ovation, marking only the second time a film has ever received a standing ovation at FrightFest in the festival's 18-year history. Green took the film on a 52-city theatrical world tour throughout the fall of 2017 in advance of its February 6, 2018 release on home video. The film stars Kane Hodder, Parry Shen, Laura Ortiz, Brian Quinn, Dave Sheridan, Felissa Rose, and Tiffany Shepis.

=== Frozen ===
Frozen (2010) is Green's low-budget thriller, starring Kevin Zegers, Emma Bell and Shawn Ashmore. The film premiered at the Sundance Film Festival and was released in North American theaters on February 5, 2010. Metacritic rated it 45/100 based on 16 reviews. Rotten Tomatoes reported a 62% approval rating and an average score of 5.9/10; the site's critical consensus reads: "Writer/director Adam Green has the beginnings of an inventive, frightening yarn in Frozen, but neither the script nor the cast are quite strong enough to truly do it justice." On the other hand, some critics were pleased with the results. Jeannette Catsoulis of The New York Times writes: "A minimalist setup delivers maximum fright in [this] nifty little chiller that balances its cold terrain with an unexpectedly warm heart." And Rex Reed presents more impressions in his sensationalist article in The New York Observer: "I was left so paralyzed with terror by this movie that I chewed a whole pencil in half watching it."

=== Chillerama: "Anne Frankenstein" ===
Green wrote and directed segment "The Diary of Anne Frankenstein" as part of the 2011 comedy/horror anthology Chillerama, which consists of four short films by four different filmmakers. The parody "Anne Frankenstein" is shot in black and white and made entirely in German to look and feel like a lost 1940's foreign film. While Green cast authentic German speaking actors for all roles, the lead role of Adolf Hitler is portrayed by Joel David Moore, who does not know how to speak German and purposely fakes his way through the film by using a combination of gibberish and random words thrown to him by Green, such as "Boba Fett", "OshKosh B'Gosh" and "Goldie Hawn". Kane Hodder portrays the film's hero Meshugannah – a Hassidic Jewish take on the classic Frankenstein monster, who ultimately turns against his master and kills him.

=== Holliston ===
Based on Green's life and largely adapted from his romantic comedy Coffee & Donuts, the sitcom Holliston follows the lives of Adam (played by Green) and Joe (played by a fellow genre director and real-life best friend, Joe Lynch), two aspiring horror filmmakers living in the small town of Holliston, Massachusetts. Together they work at a local cable advertising station and struggle with fledgling careers, making ends meet and dealing with the opposite sex. The ensemble cast includes Laura Ortiz (who plays Laura, Joe's girlfriend), Corri English (who plays Corri, Adam's ex-girlfriend and the greatest heartbreak of his life), Dee Snider (who plays Lance Rockett, Adam and Joe's cross-dressing boss, still stuck in the 80's, who is the lead singer for a Van Halen cover band), and GWAR frontman Dave Brockie (who played Oderus, Adam's imaginary alien friend who lives in his closet).

Holliston was the first original series for FEARnet. Green wrote and directed the six episodes comprising season one of this show, mixing comedy, horror, romance, and described by the network as "Big Bang Theory meets Evil Dead 2". The first season was filmed in September–October 2011 and produced by ArieScope Pictures. Series was advertised in the January 13, 2012 issue of Entertainment Weekly and launched on the FEARnet network on April 3, 2012, with a second season formally announced after two episodes. Guest stars include Seth Green, John Landis, Kane Hodder, Brian Posehn, Ray Wise, Deanna Pappas, Derek Mears, Colton Dunn, Danielle Harris, Nick Ballard, Parry Shen, Magda Apanowicz, and Tony Todd. In interviews Green has described Holliston as his "most passionate of passion projects" and explained that the show took him over 13 years to bring to fruition.

After the 2014 death of cast member Dave Brockie and the dissolving of FEARnet just a few weeks later, Holliston went on an indefinite hiatus. In July 2015, Entertainment Weekly announced that Holliston would return with a third season.

=== Digging Up the Marrow ===
Green's undercover project, Digging Up the Marrow, described as a reality based dark fantasy about monsters, was made in collaboration between Green and popular urban artist Alex Pardee. Production began in 2010 and was fully completed in 2014. In the documentary-style movie Green plays himself; Will Barratt, loyal Green collaborator since 1997, is cameraman; and actor Ray Wise portrays Detective William Dekker, an eccentric and mysterious man who contacts Green with the claim that monsters not only exist, but that he knows where to find them.

After an unofficial preview of a work-in-progress cut in 2013 at Harry Knowles's annual Butt-Numb-A-Thon, the final version of Digging Up The Marrow premiered at FrightFest in London on August 23, 2014. The film was released in US cinemas and VOD on February 20, 2015, and on DVD and Blu-ray March 24, 2015. Rotten Tomatoes reports that 53% of 15 surveyed critics gave the film a positive review; the average rating is 5.7/10. Metacritic rated it 45/100 based on eight reviews.

== Filmography ==
=== Feature films ===
| Year | Title | Credited as | | | | Notes |
| Year | Title | Director | Writer | Producer | Actor | Notes |
|---|---|---|---|---|---|---|
| 2000 | Coffee & Donuts | Yes | Yes | Yes | Yes | |
| 2006 | Hatchet | Yes | Yes | Yes | Yes | |
| 2007 | Spiral | Yes | | | | |
| 2008 | Gingerdead Man 2: Passion of the Crust | | | | Yes | |
| 2009 | Grace | | | Yes | Yes | |
| 2010 | Frozen | Yes | Yes | | Yes | |
| 2010 | Hatchet II | Yes | Yes | Yes | Yes | |
| 2011 | Chillerama | Yes | Yes | Yes | Yes | |
| 2013 | Hatchet III | | Yes | Yes | Yes | |
| 2014 | Digging Up the Marrow | Yes | Yes | Yes | Yes | also editor |
| 2015 | Tales of Halloween | | | | Yes | |
| 2017 | Victor Crowley | Yes | Yes | Yes | Yes | |
| 2018 | For the Love of Halloween | Yes | Yes | Yes | Yes | also editor |
| 2026 | Ascent | Yes | | | | |

=== Television series ===
- It's a Mall World (2007) – short form mini-series, 13 episodes
- Winter Tales (2007) – claymation mini-series, 5 episodes
- Cheerleader Camp (2007) – half-hour comedy, pilot episode
- Sexy Nightmare Slayers (2011) – comedy, pilot episode
- Holliston (2012–2013) – half-hour horror sitcom, 17 episodes
- Adam Green's Scary Sleepover (2015–2020) – biographical talk-show, 33 episodes
- Horrified (2015–2017) – biographical talk-show, 44 episodes
- Heart Baby Eggplant (2020) – 7 episodes

=== Short films ===
- A Voice Named Reason (1996)
- Columbus Day Weekend (1998)
- Stagefright (2000)
- Oh, Sherrie (2001)
- Steven's Room (2002)
- The Real World Hollywood (2003)
- Midnight (2004)
- Trick or Treat (2005)
- King in the Box (2006)
- The Tiffany Problem (2007)
- The Tivo (2008)
- Fairy Tale Police (2008)
- Saber (2009)
- Jack Chop (2009)
- Just Take One (2010)
- The Diary of Anne Frankenstein (2011) (segment from Chillerama)
- Downloading and You (2011)
- Driving Lessons (2012)
- Halloween Hugs (2013)
- Saber III (2014)
- Turn Off Your Bloody Phone (2014)
- Happy Halloween (2014)
- Monster Problems (2015)
- Don't Do It! (2016)
- A Holliston Halloween (2017)
- The Intervention (2018)
- Pumpkin Dick (2019)
- Full Size (2020)
- Ghost Dog (2021)
- Halloween Costume Cruelty (2022)
- Halloween Socks (2023)
- The Pet Sitter (2024)
- Halloween Hangover: A Star Wars Story (2025)
- No More Candy (2026)

=== Acting roles ===
- Columbus Day Weekend (1998) – Michael Myers
- Coffee & Donuts (2000) – Adam
- Steven's Room (2002) – Matt
- The Real World Hollywood (2003) – Shlomo
- Hatchet (2006) – Buddy #1
- The Eden Formula (TV Sci-Fi – 2006) – Maury
- The Tiffany Problem (2007) – Gilligan
- Winter Tales (2007) – Voices
- Gingerdead Man 2: Passion of the Crust (2008) – Toothless McHomeless
- Fairy Tale Police (2008) – Rudolph
- Jack Chop (2009) – Guy from Lynn #1
- Grace (2009) – Meat Clerk
- Ultradome (2010) – Jedi Knight
- Frozen (2010) – Guy on Chairlift #1
- Look: The Series (TV drama – 2010) – Club Patron
- Just Take One (2010) – Ernie
- Hatchet II (2010) – Buddy #1
- Holliston (TV sitcom – season 1 – 2012) – Adam
- Holliston (TV sitcom – season 2 – 2013) – Adam
- Halloween Hugs (2013) – Adam
- Hatchet III (2013) – Drunken Prisoner
- Digging Up the Marrow (2014) – Adam Green
- 20 Seconds To Live (2015) – Husband
- Tales of Halloween (2015) – Carlo
- Victor Crowley (2017) – Craig
- A Holliston Halloween (2017) – Adam
- The Intervention (2018) – Adam
- Video Palace (2018) – Adam
- Full Size (2020) – Adam
- Halloween Socks (2023) – Prince Richard / Ravishing Rick
- The Talos Principle 2 (2023) – Yaqut
- The Talos Principle 2: Road to Elysium (2024) – Yaqut
- Halloween Hangover: A Star Wars Story (2025) – General Bastian
- Azathoth Blues (2026) – Ben Wade

=== Other appearances ===
- The Making of 'Hatchet' (2007)
- 'Hatchet" Anatomy of a Kill (2007)
- 'Hatchet" A Twisted Tale (2007)
- Guts & Gore: The FX of 'Hatchet' (2007)
- 'Hatchet" Meeting Victor Crowley (2007)
- The Making of 'Spiral' (2008)
- The Road to FrightFest (2008)
- His Name Was Jason: 30 Years of Friday the 13th (2009)
- The Road to FrightFest II: American Douchebags in London (2009)
- Grace: Conception (2009)
- Grace: Family (2009)
- Grace: Delivered (2009)
- The Psycho Legacy (2009)
- Into the Dark: Exploring the Horror Film (2009)
- Frozen: Catching Frostbite (2010)
- Frozen: Three Below Zero (2010)
- Frozen: Shooting Through It (2010)
- Frozen: Beating the Mountain (2010)
- Frozen: Thawing Out (2010)
- Brides of Horror (2010)
- The Rotten Tomatoes Show (2010)
- The Road to FrightFest III: The Douchebrothers Project (2010)
- 'Hatchet 2' Behind the Screams (2010)
- 'Hatchet 2' Meet the FX Team (2010)
- 'Hatchet 2' First Look (2010)
- The Making of Anne Frankenstein (2011)
- The Road to Holliston (2012)
- 'Hatchet 3' Behind the Scenes (2013)
- 'Hatchet 3' Raising Kane (2013)
- 'Hatchet 3' Swamp Fun (2013)
- Adam Green's Scary Sleepover (2015-2020)
- Monsters of the Marrow: The Making of 'Digging Up the Marrow' (2015)
- Horrified (2015)
- Shudder's The Core (2017)
- Fly On The Set – The Making of Victor Crowley (2018)
- Raising The Dead... Again – An Interview about Victor Crowley (2018)
- Steven Tyler: Out On A Limb (2018)
- To Hell and Back: The Kane Hodder Story (2018)
- Wolfman's Got Nards (2018)
- Survival of the Film Freaks (2018)
- Video Palace (2018)
- FrightFest: Beneath the Dark Heart of Cinema (2018)
- Shudder's The Last Drive-In (2020)
- This is GWAR (2021)
- Hollywood Dreams & Nightmares: The Robert Englund Story (2022)
- Spooktacular! (2023)
- Paint it Red: The Making of 'Spiral' (2024)
- Hatchet: Swamp Tales (2024)
- Hatchet: The Production Journals (2024)

== Discography ==
- Ghosts of Salem

== Bibliography ==
| Year | Title | Credit |
|---|---|---|
| 2008 | The Book of Lists: Horror | Contributing writer |
| 2011 | Hack/Slash: Hatchet/Slash | Characters' creator |
| 2011 | Unmasked | Foreword |
| 2016 | Holliston: Friendship Is Tragic | Creator |
| 2017 | Hatchet: Issue 0 | Creator |
| 2017 | Hatchet: Issue 1 | Creator |
| 2018 | Hatchet: Issue 2 | Creator |
| 2018 | Hatchet: Issue 3 | Creator |
| 2018 | Holliston: Carnival Of Carnage | Creator |
| 2018 | I, Survivor | Writer |
| 2019 | Hatchet – Vengeance: Issue 1 | Creator |
| 2019 | Hatchet – Vengeance: Issue 2 | Creator |
| 2019 | Hatchet – Victor Crowley's Halloween Tales | Creator |
| 2020 | Hatchet – Victor Crowley's Halloween Tales 2 | Creator and writer |
| 2021 | Hatchet – Vengeance: Issue 3 | Creator |
| 2021 | Hatchet – Unstoppable Horror | Creator |
| 2021 | Hatchet – Victor Crowley's Halloween Tales 3 | Creator |
| 2021 | Holliston: Holliston Goes to Hell | Creator |
| 2022 | Hatchet – Victor Crowley's Halloween Tales 4 | Creator |
| 2023 | Hatchet – Victor Crowley's Halloween Tales 5 | Creator |
| 2024 | Hatchet – Victor Crowley's Halloween Tales 6 | Creator |
| 2024 | Hatchet – Midnight Murders: Issue 1 | Creator |
| 2024 | Hatchet – Midnight Murders: Issue 2 | Creator |
| 2025 | Hatchet – Midnight Murders: Issue 3 | Creator |
| 2026 | Hatchet - Victor Crowley's Halloween Tales 2026 | Creator |

== Awards and nominations ==
| Year | Award | Category | Title of work | Result |
|---|---|---|---|---|
| 2000 | The Smoky Mountain/Nantahala Film Festival | Best Feature Film | Coffee & Donuts | Won |
| 2000 | The Smoky Mountain/Nantahala Film Festival | Best Actor | Coffee & Donuts | Nominated |
| 2006 | Austin Fantastic Fest | Audience Award | Hatchet | Won |
| 2007 | Fright Meter Awards | Best Horror Movie | Hatchet | Nominated |
| 2007 | Fantasia Film Festival | Best European/North – South American Film | Hatchet | Won |
| 2007 | Austin Fantastic Fest | Next Wave Award | Spiral | Won |
| 2007 | Santa Barbara International Film Festival | Kodak Gold Vision Award | Spiral | Won |
| 2009 | Gerardmer Film Festival | Best Feature Film | Grace | Won |
| 2009 | Sitges – Catalan International Film Festival | Best Film | Grace | Nominated |
| 2009 | Toronto After Dark Film Festival | Vision Award | Grace | Won |
| 2009 | Neuchatel International Fantasy Film Festival | Best Feature Film | Grace | Nominated |
| 2009 | The Official Star Wars Fan Film Awards | Best Action | Saber | Won |
| 2009 | The Official Star Wars Fan Film Awards | Audience Choice | Saber | Won |
| 2010 | Saturn Awards | Best Horror Film | Frozen | Nominated |
| 2010 | Fright Meter Awards | Best Director | Frozen | Won |
| 2010 | Fright Meter Awards | Best Screenplay | Frozen | Nominated |
| 2010 | Fright Meter Awards | Best Director | Hatchet II | Nominated |
| 2010 | Fright Meter Awards | Best Horror Movie | Hatchet II | Nominated |
| 2011 | Scream Awards | Best Independent Movie | Hatchet II | Nominated |
| 2011 | Rondo Hatton Classic Horror Awards | Best Independent Film | Chillerama | Won |
| 2014 | BloodGuts UK Horror Awards | Best Director | Digging Up The Marrow | Won |
| 2014 | BloodGuts UK Horror Awards | Best Actor | Digging Up The Marrow | Won |
| 2014 | BloodGuts UK Horror Awards | Best Screenplay | Digging Up The Marrow | Nominated |
| 2014 | BloodGuts UK Horror Awards | Best Editor | Digging Up The Marrow | Nominated |
| 2017 | Toronto After Dark Film Festival Awards | Best Kill | Victor Crowley | Won |
| 2017 | Toronto After Dark Film Festival Awards | Best Gore | Victor Crowley | Won |
| 2017 | Toronto After Dark Film Festival Awards | Best Practical Effects | Victor Crowley | Won |
| 2017 | Toronto After Dark Film Festival Awards | Best Monster/Creature | Victor Crowley | Won |
