= Emma Bell =

American actress (born 1986)

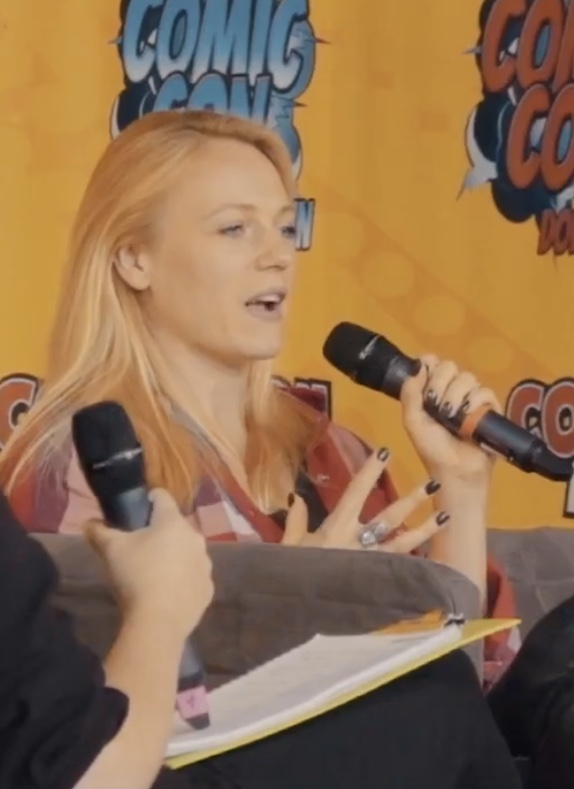
- Bell at the 2018 German Comic Con Berlin
- Born: Emma Jean Bell; December 17, 1986 (age 39); Woodstown, New Jersey, U.S.
- Occupation: Actress
- Years active: 2004–present
- Spouse: Camron Robertson (m. 2018)
- Children: 2

Emma Jean Bell (born December 17, 1986) is an American actress, best known for her role as Parker O'Neal in the films Frozen and Hatchet II (both 2010), as Molly Harper in Final Destination 5 (2011), and for playing Amy in the first and third season of the AMC post apocalyptic series The Walking Dead (2010; 2012), and Emma Judith Ryland Brown on the TNT drama series Dallas (2013–2014).

== Early life and family ==
Emma Bell, who was born on December 17, 1986, in Woodstown, New Jersey, grew up in Flemington and the Stanton section of Readington Township and attended Hunterdon Central Regional High School. She moved to New York City at the age of 16. She attended Talent Unlimited High School Performing Arts High School on the Upper East Side of Manhattan.

Her mother, Tessa Horan, was a producer for 60 Minutes, and her father, Robert M. "Rob" Bell, owns Green Birdie Productions, a full-service video production company in Lambertville, New Jersey. Her father was also a reporter, videographer and writer-producer for WWOR-TV. Her brother, Chase Bell, is a musician. Her paternal grandparents are Ensign Charles Robert Bell and Elise Emma Stone, a Daughter of the American Revolution. Both are graduates of Swarthmore College in 1939. Her grandfather is also graduated from the Naval Supply School, Harvard University in 1941. Her grandparents married in Brooklyn on a Sunday, September 14, 1941. Her aunt is Jean Elise Bell. Her great-grandparents were Lieutenant Mead Wilmer Stone, who fought in the First World War and was a co-owner of George Malvese and Company of Garden City Park, in Long Island, and Lillie Seamann.

== Career ==
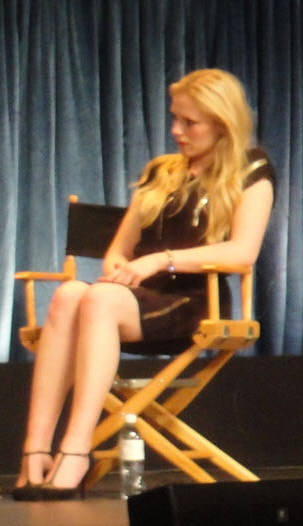
Bell at the PaleyFest 2011.

Bell began her acting career in an Off-Broadway cabaret show in New York at the age of 12. She made her screen debut in 2004, in the episode of NBC drama series Third Watch. She later appeared on Law & Order: Special Victims Unit, and in 2006 starred in the short-lived The WB television series The Bedford Diaries. She also appeared on such other shows as Supernatural, Law & Order, and CSI: Miami. She made her film debut in the 2007 sports drama film Gracie and also appeared in New York City Serenade, The Favor, Death in Love, and Elektra Luxx.

In 2010, Bell starred as Parker O'Neill, one of the main characters in the film Frozen. The film has received positive reviews from critics and in same year she named one of the "55 Faces of the Future" in Nylon's young Hollywood issue. She appeared in Hatchet II, in which she reprised her Frozen role in an uncredited cameo. Also in 2010, Bell portrayed the role of Amy, the younger sister of Andrea (Laurie Holden) in Season 1 of the AMC drama series The Walking Dead. In 2011, Bell starred as Molly Harper, the female lead character, in the 2011 thriller-horror film Final Destination 5.

Bell starred in two television pilots through NBC but neither resulted in becoming full series, Reconstruction in 2011 and Midnight Sun in 2012. In September 2012, it was announced that Bell had signed on as a series regular on the second season of TNT's drama series Dallas. She played the role of Emma Judith Ryland Brown, Ann Ewing's (Brenda Strong) and Harris Ryland's (Mitch Pileggi) daughter, and Judith Brown Ryland's (Judith Light) granddaughter. In 2013, Bell also starred in independent films Life Inside Out, Bipolar, and See You in Valhalla.

In 2016, Bell played young Emily Dickinson in the drama film A Quiet Passion starring Cynthia Nixon. She made her directing debut with short film Scratch (2016), receiving multiple Festival Awards. She later directed and wrote short film Between the Pines. On television, she has appeared on Law & Order: Special Victims Unit, American Horror Story: Roanoke and NCIS. She starred alongside Dan Fogler in the drama film The Argument directed by Robert Schwartzman.

== Personal life ==
On October 6, 2018, Bell married fellow actor Camron Robertson. On October 28, 2020, she gave birth to their first child, a daughter. She gave birth to their second child, a son, on June 18, 2024.

== Filmography ==
=== Film ===
Year	Title	Role	Notes
2007	Gracie	Kate Dorset	
2007	New York City Serenade	Melinda	
2007	The Favor	Jenny	
2008	Death in Love	Young Girl	
2010	Frozen	Parker O'Neal	
2010	Elektra Luxx	Eleanore Linbrook	
2010	Hatchet II	Parker O'Neal	Uncredited cameo
2011	New Romance	Emma	Short film
2011	Final Destination 5	Molly Harper	
2012	Breaking Wind	Rosalie	Uncredited
2013	The Food Ditty	Emma Bee	Short film
2014	Life Inside Out	Keira	
2014	Bipolar	Anna	
2015	See You in Valhalla	Faye	
2015	The Good Ones	Tara	Short film
2016	A Quiet Passion	Young Emily Dickinson	
2016	Scratch		Short film, director
2017	Byoutiful	Nell	Short film
2017	Different Flowers	Millie Haven	
2019	Plus One	Perfect Maid of Honor	
2019	Deviant Love	Jamie	
2019	Between the Pines		Short film, director and writer
2019	Why?	Dana	
2020	The Argument	Lisa	

=== Television ===
Year	Title	Role	Notes
2004	Third Watch	Pamela Stewart	Episode: "Sins of the Fathers"
2004	Law & Order: Special Victims Unit	Alison Luhan	Episode: "Outcry"
2006	The Bedford Diaries	Rachel Fein	Recurring role; 5 episodes
2007	Law & Order	Kirsten Paley	Episode: "Talking Points"
2009	Ghost Whisperer	Paula Hathaway	Episode: "Body of Water"
2009	Dollhouse	Tango	Episode: "Needs"
2009	Supernatural	Lindsey	Episode: "Free to Be You and Me"
2010; 2012	The Walking Dead	Amy Harrison	Recurring role (season 1), voice role (season 3); 6 episodes
2011	CSI: Miami	Jennifer Olsen	Episode: "Look Who's Taunting"
2012	Midnight Sun	Rory Harring	Unsold television pilot
2012	Arrow	Emily Nocenti	Episode: "Honor Thy Father"
2013–2014	Dallas	Emma Brown	Main role (seasons 2-3); 30 episodes
2014	Law & Order: Special Victims Unit	Rose Summers	Episode: "Reasonable Doubt"
2016	American Horror Story: Roanoke	Tracy Logan	Episode: "Chapter 10"
2016	Rizzoli & Isles	Christine McKenzie	Episode: "Cops vs. Zombies"
2016–2017	Relationship Status	Claire	Main role; 7 episodes
2017	Flip the Script	Ad Exec 3	Miniseries; Episode: "Mad Women"
2017	Kevin (Probably) Saves the World	Deb	Episode: "Sweet Little Lies"
2017	Designated Survivor	Carey Morgan	Episode: "Line of Fire"
2018	Lucifer	Mia Hytner	Episode: "Quintessential Deckerstar"
2019	NCIS	Hannah McClain	Episode: "Musical Chairs"

=== Music videos ===
Year	Title	Artist
2011	"New Romance"	Miles Fisher

== Award and nominations ==
Year	Award	Category	Work	Result
2011	Eyegore Awards	Actress	The Walking Dead	Won
2010	Fright Meter Awards	Best Actress	Frozen	Nominated
