= Victor Crowley =

- Theatrical release poster
- Directed by: Adam Green
- Written by: Adam Green
- Produced by: Sarah Elbert; Cory Neal; Greg Newman
- Starring: Parry Shen; Laura Ortiz; Dave Sheridan; Krystal Joy Brown; Felissa Rose; Kane Hodder
- Cinematography: Jan-Michael Losada
- Edited by: Matt Latham
- Music by: Jason Akers; Sam Ewing
- Production company: ArieScope Pictures
- Distributed by: Dark Sky Films
- Release dates: August 22, 2017 (Premiere); October 5, 2017 (United States)
- Running time: 83 minutes
- Country: United States
- Language: English

Victor Crowley (also known as Hatchet IV) is a 2017 American supernatural slasher film written and directed by Adam Green. It is the sequel to Hatchet III, and serves as the fourth installment in the Hatchet film series. Kane Hodder returns to the role of the titular killer Victor Crowley. Critical reaction for the film was generally mixed.

== Plot ==
A decade after the events of the first three films, the survivor of the Honey Island Swamp massacre Andrew Yong is told by his publicist Kathleen that he has been offered a special interview for a true crime TV series, but that the producers have insisted that his interview take place in the Honey Island Swamp. Andrew initially refuses to go due to his trauma from his experience with Victor Crowley, but is convinced when Kathleen tells him they have offered him $600,000, and she got them to go up to $1,000,000.

Andrew and Kathleen head out on a private charter plane, where Andrew learns that his interview will be hosted by his ex-wife Sabrina and her crew: audio technician Austin, his videographer girlfriend Casey, makeup artist Jay, and production assistant Zach. Suddenly, one of the plane's engines explodes during flight, and Jay and Zach are killed as the plane starts plummeting to the ground.

Meanwhile, at the swamp, Chloe, her boyfriend Alex, and her best friend Rose are preparing to film a trailer for a movie they are creating based on the Crowley massacre, alongside eccentric swamp tour guide/local actor Dillon. For the sake of research, Rose begins searching YouTube for videos of people attempting to recite the voodoo curse that originally brought Crowley back to life. Rose and Dillon overhear the plane crashing, and so go off to investigate, while Alex stays behind to calm Chloe down.

At the plane wreckage, Dillon and Rose find that everyone, aside from Jay, Zach and the pilots have managed to survive the crash, but that Casey is trapped under the seats and has water slowly rising around her due to the plane being partially submerged in the swamp. Meanwhile, Rose's phone autoplays a video of Reverend Zombie reciting the voodoo curse, resurrecting Crowley, who kills Alex. Chloe flees and nearly makes it to the plane wreckage, but is severely wounded by Crowley, who leaves her out in the open as bait.

With the survivors having witnessed the attack, Kathleen begins to suffer from a panic attack and flees the plane. Austin attempts to stop her, but he and Kathleen are both killed by Crowley, who then finishes Chloe off and attacks the plane, making it sink further and causing Casey to drown.

As Dillon locks himself in the pilot's cabin, hoping to radio for help, Andrew, Sabrina and Rose all flee in separate directions while Crowley attempts to saw his way into the wreckage. Crowley kills Sabrina and then corners Rose, Dillon and Andrew, who have gotten the plane engine working. Crowley gets stuck in the engine, but before he can free himself, Dillon sacrifices himself by tackling Crowley into the engine, ultimately shredding them both.

The next day, Marybeth Dunston, the survivor of all his three massacre sprees watches a news report about the plane crash, which reports on the discovery of several dead bodies seemingly unrelated to the plane crash. Realizing Crowley has returned, she brandishes a shotgun, saying; "I've been waiting for you, motherfucker!"

== Cast ==
- Parry Shen as Andrew
- Laura Ortiz as Rose
- Dave Sheridan as Dillon
- Krystal Joy Brown as Sabrina
- Felissa Rose as Kathleen
- Brian Quinn as Austin
- Tiffany Shepis as Casey
- Chase Williamson as Alex
- Katie Booth as Chloe
- Kelly Vrooman as Sue
- Jonah Ray as Del
- Kane Hodder as Victor Crowley
- Tyler Mane as Bernard
- Blake Woodruff as Zach
- Danielle Harris as Marybeth Dunston
- Tony Todd as Reverend Zombie (uncredited)
- Adam Green as Co-Pilot Craig Borden (uncredited)
- Joe Lynch as Pilot Matthew Waters (uncredited)

== Production ==
In November 2015, reports emerged that a fourth entry in the Hatchet series was in development. Simultaneously, various outlets alleged that a New Nightmare-esque premise was proposed by series creator Adam Green, but was rejected by the studio. However, Dread Central debunked these claims and instead revealed that Green opted not to move forward with the pitch. Green would later become disenchanted in continuing the franchise and was adamant there wouldn't be another installment. It wasn't until George A. Romero convinced Green to finally make the film at the Rock and Shock convention. Green immediately began work on the script, under the title Arwen's Fancy Dinner.

Principal photography began in secret under the working title Arwen's Revenge. Production spanned eleven days, while an entire day of filming was lost due to a set collapsing. Cast members Kane Hodder, Parry Shen, Laura Ortiz, Dave Sheridan, and Brian Quinn were officially revealed in August 2017.

In July 2017, it was announced that an official '10th Anniversary Event' screening of the original Hatchet film would be playing at the FrightFest Film Festival of 2017, featuring newly released footage. The same event, which took place on August 22, 2017, in Los Angeles, brought forth the announcement that it was actually the premiere of a secretly filmed Hatchet sequel titled Victor Crowley. Green said on the matter, "I couldn't be happier to partner with Dark Sky Films and bring Victor Crowley back to horror fans around the world. Resurrecting the series for its tenth anniversary was our way of saying thank you to everyone in The Hatchet Army and beyond who have supported this series since its inception. This bloodbath is for all of you."

== Release ==
=== Theatrical ===
Victor Crowley debuted on August 22, 2017, in Los Angeles, California. The film began screening in select theatres across the United States on October 5, 2017, on special one night events featuring Adam Green collectively known as the "Victor Crowley Road Show".

=== Home media ===
The film was released on blu-ray and DVD on February 6, 2018.

== Reception ==
On Rotten Tomatoes, Victor Crowley holds an approval rating of 67% based on 15 reviews, with an average rating of 6.7/10.

Steve Barton of Dread Central awarded the film a quality rating of 4 out of 5, stating that "Victor Crowley is a smartly written, outrageously funny, and incredibly gory affair that's nothing short of a gift for slasher fans who appreciate their films wrapped in viscera with gallons of blood to spare." JoBlo.com said of the film "VICTOR CROWLEY may be the best of the sequels to HATCHET, perhaps the best in the series." Kalyn Corrigan of Bloody Disgusting called it "the Gory Slasher Film You're Craving!", while critiquing "Sure, they spend a little too much time on the plane, and it would've been nice to see some of the more human characters last a bit longer during the runtime, but... in all honesty, it's just nice to have a series in the same iconic style that we can count on to carry us through the years of big studio films and over produced predictable cash grabs." Alternately, Brad Miska also reviewing for Bloody Disgusting said, "While Hatchet has since become an iconic franchise, none of the sequels have been able to recreate the magic of the first film. The latest, Victor Crowley, is easily the worst of the bunch."

== Potential sequel ==
In October 2019, Danielle Harris revealed that two more films were planned by the studio, with the intention of shooting both back-to-back. In May 2020, Green said that a fifth film was a "safe bet" due to the financial success of Victor Crowley.
