= Holliston (TV series) =

- Genre: Comedy; Horror; Romance
- Created by: Adam Green
- Starring: Adam Green; Joe Lynch; Laura Ortiz; Corri English; Dave Brockie; Dee Snider
- Country of origin: United States
- Original language: English
- No. of seasons: 2
- No. of episodes: 17

Production
- Executive producers: Adam Green; Joe Lynch; Cory Neal; Andrew Mysko; Peter Block
- Producers: Will Barratt; Sarah Elbert; Sean Becker
- Production locations: Holliston, Massachusetts, United States; Hollywood, California, United States
- Running time: 35-40 minutes (Season 1); 50 minutes (Christmas Special); 22 minutes (Season 2)
- Production companies: ArieScope Pictures; A Bigger Boat

Original release
- Network: FEARnet
- Release: April 3, 2012 – August 6, 2013

Holliston is an American horror sitcom created by Adam Green, which debuted on April 3, 2012 on the FEARnet cable television network as their only original series. Aside from the FEARnet cable television network, the show is also offered to watch on outlets such as Hulu, iTunes, and FEARnet On-Demand.

== Plot ==
Set in the small New England town of Holliston, Massachusetts, the series stars creator/writer/director/executive producer/showrunner Adam Green as "Adam" and executive producer Joe Lynch as "Joe", who are college grads that are chasing their dream to become horror filmmakers, whilst not quite making ends meet working at a local cable access station. The main ensemble is rounded out by Laura Ortiz (who plays "Laura", Joe's bubbly yet artistically morbid girlfriend) and Corri English (who plays "Corri", Adam's ex-girlfriend and childhood sweetheart that he is constantly trying to win back). The show regularly features Twisted Sister's Dee Snider as Adam and Joe's cross-dressing, glam rock loving boss "Lance Rockett" and Oderus Urungus (Dave Brockie) of Gwar as "Oderus", Adam's imaginary alien friend who lives in his closet.

== Cast ==
- Adam Green as Adam
- Joe Lynch as Joe
- Laura Ortiz as Laura
- Corri English as Corri
- Dee Snider as Lance Rockett
- Dave Brockie as Oderus Urungus

== Critical reception ==
Dread Central said "Season Two of “Holliston” is a quantum leap forward for a show that was already very, very good." Tyler Doupe of Comingsoon.net said "Holliston has a ton of heart. It will appeal to horror fans because it is made by horror fans for horror fans." The Austin Chronicle described the show as "The result is half Sabrina, The Teenage Witch, half Monty Python...Think of it as the show you hoped The Big Bang Theory would be."

On the other hand, Nick Venable of Cinema Blend panned the show calling it a "shitty sitcom" and "On paper, you could say it’s The League meets Spaced. But then you realize you’re holding toilet paper, and these are the smeared crayon ramblings of a child. " Ken Hanley of Fangoria gave it two out of four skulls saying "while the show brazenly attempts to relate to the horror crowd while incorporating atypical elements of a sitcom, the success rate is a mixed bag, as every fun moment of earned goofiness is quickly offset by a cheap, uninspired gag."

== Production ==
The series is produced by Green's own production company 'ArieScope Pictures', in association with 'A Bigger Boat'. In Season 2, Supervising Producer Sean Becker was promoted to serve as director on many of the episodes in an effort to make Green's duties on the series more manageable. Composer Bear McCreary, who also writes the music for TV shows like The Walking Dead and Battlestar Galactica, provides the original score for Holliston. Shot in a multicamera format, the show uses a laugh track though Green has expressed interest to shoot in front of a live audience.

On April 17, 2012, not long after the show's premiere, FEARnet announced that it had not only picked up Holliston for a second season scheduled for summer 2013, but also increased the episode order from 6 episodes to 10. In addition to the 10 episodes making up Season 2, a 1-Hour "Christmas Special" aired on December 18, 2012 serving as a bridge between Season's 1 and 2. Season 1 was released in the USA on DVD and Blu-ray Disc on October 9, 2012.

The show has had guest stars such as comedian Seth Green, Tony Todd, Danielle Harris, Kane Hodder, Bailee Madison, director John Landis, Ray Wise, comedian Brian Posehn, Bill Moseley, Sid Haig, James Gunn and Derek Mears.

The series began an extended hiatus at the end of 2013 as Adam Green and Joe Lynch went to work directing their next films (Digging Up The Marrow and Everly), Corri English gave birth to a baby boy, and the rest of the cast became busy with other film/TV projects and tours. Following the death of Dave Brockie and the closure of Fearnet, when and if the series would continue was unknown at the time.

July 20, 2015, Entertainment Weekly reported that, per announcement by Adam Green and Joe Lynch on their The Movie Crypt podcast, Holliston would return for a third season in 2016 on GeekNation. However, the third season was never aired.

In 2018, a one-off short - A Holliston Halloween - was released.

== Episodes ==
=== Series overview ===
Season	Episodes	Originally released	
Season	Episodes	First released	Last released
1	6	April 3, 2012	May 8, 2012
2	11	December 18, 2012	August 6, 2013

=== Season 1 (2012) ===
No. overall	No. in season	Title	Directed by	Written by	Original release date
1	1	"The Hooker"	Adam Green	Adam Green	April 3, 2012
2	2	"Camera Rental"	Adam Green	Adam Green	April 10, 2012
3	3	"Skunked"	Adam Green	Adam Green	April 17, 2012
4	4	"Candyman"	Adam Green	Adam Green	April 24, 2012
5	5	"Laura's Little Twitter"	Adam Green	Adam Green	May 1, 2012
6	6	"Weekend of Horrors"	Adam Green	Adam Green	May 8, 2012

=== Season 2 (2012–2013) ===
No. overall	No. in season	Title	Directed by	Written by	Original release date
7	1	"The Christmas Special"	Adam Green	Adam Green	December 18, 2012
8	2	"Suicidal Tendencies"	Sean Becker	Adam Green	June 4, 2013
9	3	"Halloween Girl"	Sean Becker	Adam Green	June 11, 2013
10	4	"Hobgoblin"	Adam Green	Adam Green	June 18, 2013
11	5	"Honesty"	Sean Becker	Adam Green	June 25, 2013
12	6	"Rock The Cradle"	Sean Becker	Adam Green	July 2, 2013
13	7	"Joe's Soda"	Sean Becker	Adam Green	July 9, 2013
14	8	"Blobby"	Adam Green	Adam Green	July 16, 2013
15	9	"Cursed"	Sean Becker	Adam Green	July 23, 2013
16	10	"Kevin's Wedding"	Sean Becker	Adam Green	July 30, 2013
17	11	"Farm Festival"	Sean Becker	Adam Green	August 6, 2013
