= Hatchet II =

- Theatrical release poster
- Directed by: Adam Green
- Written by: Adam Green
- Produced by: Derek Curl; Sarah Elbert; Cory Neal
- Starring: Danielle Harris; Tony Todd; Parry Shen; Tom Holland; R. A. Mihailoff; Kane Hodder
- Cinematography: Will Barratt
- Edited by: Ed Marx
- Music by: Andy Garfield
- Production companies: Dark Sky Films; ArieScope Pictures
- Distributed by: Dark Sky Films
- Release dates: August 26, 2010 (Frightfest); October 1, 2010 (United States)
- Running time: 85 minutes
- Country: United States
- Language: English
- Box office: $156,190

Hatchet II is a 2010 American slasher film written and directed by Adam Green. It is the sequel to Hatchet and the second installment in the titular film series. Picking up right where the first film ended, Hatchet II follows Marybeth as she escapes the clutches of the deformed, swamp-dwelling killer Victor Crowley. After learning the truth about her family's connection to the hatchet-wielding madman, Marybeth returns to the Louisiana swamps along with an army of hunters to recover the bodies of her family and exact the bloodiest revenge against the bayou butcher.

The film sees the return of Kane Hodder and Tony Todd who portrayed Victor Crowley and Reverend Zombie in the 2006 film, respectively. Danielle Harris portrays Marybeth, a role originally played by Tamara Feldman. The film was originally screened at the 2010 London FrightFest Film Festival on August 26, 2010. It was released unrated in the United States on October 1, 2010. A sequel, Hatchet III, was released in 2013.

== Plot ==
Immediately after Hatchet, Marybeth Dunston is attacked by Victor Crowley but manages to escape. Jack Cracker finds her and takes her back to his cabin but forces her to leave after discovering her last name, telling her to visit Reverend Zombie. Not long after she leaves, Jack is killed by Victor.

Marybeth returns to Reverend Zombie's shop, and he lets her in. After learning her last name, he tells her that her father, Sampson, was one of the boys responsible for causing the fire that led to Victor's death as a child. He also gives her more details on Victor's backstory; Thomas, Victor's father, had cheated on his wife Shyann with her nurse Lena after Shyann was diagnosed with stomach cancer. Moments before dying, Shyann placed a curse on the child conceived by Lena from the affair. Months later, Lena gave birth to Victor Crowley but died of fright after seeing Victor's deformed face.

Marybeth tells Reverend Zombie she wants to go back and retrieve the remains of her father and brother. He agrees but tells her she must bring a family member. After she leaves, Zombie calls Justin (the brother of Shawn from the first film) and tells him to summon a group of hunters (specifically including a man named Trent Graves) to go with them. Marybeth returns home, where her uncle Bob promptly shows up. He reluctantly agrees to accompany her to a recruitment meeting in Zombie's shop, where Zombie tells the hunters he will pay them $5,000 for the head of Victor Crowley. Marybeth, Bob, and the hunters proceed to venture into the swamp.

As night descends, they find the boat, and as the rest leave, two hunters, Cletus and Chad, stay by the boat while the others fan out. Marybeth, Zombie, Justin, Bob, and Trent look for Crowley's shed, as well as the bodies of his victims. Along the way, Zombie explains to Justin that Trent, Sampson, and Sampson's brother were the kids who started the fire that led to Victor's death. Since Victor has already killed Sampson, Zombie believes that if Crowley kills Bob and Trent, his soul will be at peace, and he will finally leave the swamp. Meanwhile, Victor begins murdering each of the hunters one by one.

While searching the cabin, the remaining party members hear Victor outside. As they hide, Justin tells Marybeth about Zombie's plot to get her uncle and Trent killed. As she runs to warn Bob, Victor appears behind Justin and kills him with a belt sander. Trent is murdered quickly thereafter, and Zombie drags Marybeth out of the house, trapping Bob inside with Victor, who murders him. Zombie declares Victor Crowley is dead, but Marybeth then reveals Bob was not her real uncle and was her father's best friend; her real uncle had died of leukemia when Marybeth was twelve. Now realizing his plan has failed, Zombie turns to see Victor breaking through the cabin wall. Zombie attempts to fight Victor but is brutally killed in doing so. Seconds later, however, Marybeth strikes Victor in the head with his hatchet, knocking him to the ground before she hysterically chops his head into a bloody pulp. She then grabs Zombie's shotgun and fires it into the remains of Victor's head, seemingly killing him.

== Cast ==
- Kane Hodder as Victor Crowley and Thomas Crowley
- Danielle Harris as Marybeth Dunston
- Tony Todd as Reverend Zombie
- Parry Shen as Justin
- Tom Holland as Bob
- Alexis Peters as Avery
- R.A. Mihailoff as Trent
- AJ Bowen as Layton
- Ed Ackerman as Cleatus
- David Foy as Chad
- Colton Dunn as Vernon
- Rick McCallum as John
- Erika Hamilton as Lena
- John Carl Buechler as Jack Cracker
- Kathryn Fiore as Shyann Crowley
- Rileah Vanderbilt as young Victor Crowley

Emma Bell appears in an uncredited cameo role as Parker O'Neal, reprising her role from Adam Green's previous film Frozen (released seven months before Hatchet II) in a scene serving as an epilogue to the events of the 2010 film.

== Production ==
=== Development ===
Hatchet II was announced in November 2008 when Anchor Bay Entertainment released a teaser poster for the film. Adam Green stated that he would be writing and directing, depending on how long the other projects he was working on took. He also stated that if the projects took too long, he would pass writing and directing duties on to someone else. On November 24, 2009, it was officially announced that Adam Green would return to write and direct. The final draft of the script was completed on December 7, 2009. In order to keep details under wraps, even the crew did not receive copies of the script and the majority of cast only received select pages. Fake scripts, fake endings, and fake story lines were circulated around the industry and no visitors or guests were allowed near the set. The cast gathered for their first table reading on December 15, 2009.

=== Casting ===
On November 24, 2009, along with the announcement that Adam Green would return to write and direct, it was announced that Kane Hodder would reprise the role of Victor Crowley. On November 25, it was announced that Tony Todd would be returning. On December 3, 2009 scream queen Danielle Harris announced on her official Twitter account that she would be taking over the role of Marybeth, which was originally played by Tamara Feldman. On December 8, 2009, A. J. Bowen and director Tom Holland joined the cast. The rest of the cast was announced on December 28, 2009, R.A. Mihailoff, Kathryn Fiore, Parry Shen, Rileah Vanderbilt, Ed Ackerman, Rick McCallum, Colton Dunn and David Foy.

=== Filming ===
To accommodate Green's promotional duties for the film Frozen shooting had to be split into two parts. The first portion began shooting on January 7, 2010, and ended on January 23. The second portion began January 15, 2010 and shooting for Hatchet II wrapped on February 24.

== Release ==
=== Theatrical ===
Hatchet II premiered in Europe on August 26, 2010, as part of London's Frightfest. The film was released unrated in 68 theaters across the United States by AMC Theatres as part of their AMC Independent program on October 1, 2010. The film was scheduled to be released in Toronto and Montreal theaters in Canada on the same day, but it was pulled because it was not rated by the cities' provincial rating agencies. The film was also pulled from U.S. theaters on October 4.

=== Home media ===
Hatchet II was released on DVD and Blu-ray February 1, 2011.

== Reception ==
On Rotten Tomatoes, the film has a 43% approval rating based on reviews from 35 critics. The site's consensus states, "Funnier and more gleefully gory than most slasher sequels, Hatchet II aims for so-bad-it's-good territory, but can't quite hack it."

Metacritic gave the film an average score of 49 out of 100, based on 11 reviews, indicating "mixed or average" reviews. Adam Green has personally said that this entry in the series is his favorite.
