= Frozen (2010 American film) =

2010 film by Adam Green

- Theatrical release poster
- Directed by: Adam Green
- Written by: Adam Green
- Produced by: Peter Block; Cory Neal
- Starring: Shawn Ashmore; Kevin Zegers; Emma Bell
- Cinematography: Will Barratt
- Edited by: Ed Marx
- Music by: Andy Garfield
- Production companies: A Bigger Boat; ArieScope Pictures
- Distributed by: Anchor Bay Films
- Release dates: January 24, 2010 (Sundance); February 5, 2010 (United States)
- Running time: 93 minutes
- Country: United States
- Language: English
- Box office: $3.8 million

Frozen is a 2010 American psychological horror survival film written and directed by Adam Green, and starring Shawn Ashmore, Kevin Zegers, and introducing Emma Bell. It tells the story of three friends stranded in a chairlift after a day of skiing, forced to make life-or-death choices in order to survive and get down.

The film was met with mixed-to-positive reviews, and was followed by Hatchet II (released seven months after Frozen), with Bell reprising her role in a scene serving as an epilogue to the events of Frozen.

== Plot ==
Dan Walker, his girlfriend Parker O'Neal, and his best friend Joe Lynch travel to a ski resort to enjoy a day on the slopes. On the evening of their final night, the three friends convince the ski lift operator to let them go on one last run down the mountain before the resort closes for the week due to incoming weather. The ski lift operator gets relieved from duty by a second operator. The first operator advises the second one that there are three people who still needed to come down, but the second operator mistakes three mingling skiers for Dan, Parker and Joe and shuts down the chairlift, leaving the three friends trapped many feet above the ground.

Trapped on the ski lift chair, the trio awaits rescue, enduring a snowstorm as the hours pass. A snow groomer arrives below them, but its driver fails to notice them. Realizing that no one knows their whereabouts and that they won't survive being stranded on the chairlift before they are rescued, Dan jumps off the chair. The impact fractures both of Dan's legs, leaving him completely unable to move. Parker and Joe attempt to find a way down to help him, but a pack of wolves soon arrive. Unable to reach him, Joe and Parker can only listen helplessly as Dan is torn apart by the wolves. Grieving over Dan's death, Parker and Joe blame each other for their friend's tragic passing before comforting each other. Initially indifferent of each other, the two share their history of dating, with Parker later admitting that Dan was someone she wanted to marry.

The next morning, Joe makes another attempt to make his way down by clasping onto the chairlift cable. The vibrations cause the securing bolt of the chair to loosen. With the razor sharp cable having severely injured his hands, Joe makes it onto a nearby support tower, clambering down the service ladder. On the ground, he is confronted again by the gathered wolves, though he fights them off with a ski pole. Promising Parker that he'll return with help, Joe travels down the mountain on Parker's discarded snowboard with the wolf pack in pursuit.

Now alone, Parker endures another night aboard the chair while awaiting help. Joe does not return by the next day, so Parker attempts to reach the support pole herself. As she stands in the chair, the securing bolt disconnects and the lift falls to a few meters above the ground, now held aloft by a single tether wire. Parker jumps from the chair, but unable to bear the load, the tether snaps and the chair falls, crashing onto Parker's ankle, though she has fallen safely to the ground.

Parker begins to slide and crawl down the mountain. Halfway down, she encounters the wolves feasting on Joe's mutilated corpse. Too occupied with eating, they ignore Parker as she continues down, eventually reaching a road and attempting to flag down a passing car. While it fails to notice her, another soon appears and the driver stops, taking her to a local hospital, telling her that she will be okay. Parker closes her eyes, remembering Dan's words to her.

== Cast ==
- Shawn Ashmore as Joe Lynch, Dan's best friend
- Kevin Zegers as Dan Walker, Joe's best friend
- Emma Bell as Parker O'Neal, Dan's girlfriend
- Rileah Vanderbilt as Shannon
- Ed Ackerman as Jason
- Adam Johnson as Rifkin
- Christopher York as Ryan
- Kane Hodder as Cody
- Will Barratt as Sullivan
- Adam Green as Guy on Chairlift #1
- Joe Lynch as Guy on Chairlift #2
- Peder Melhuse as Driver
- Cody Blue Snider as Twisted Sister fan in cafeteria

== Production ==
Frozen was filmed at Snowbasin near Ogden, Utah, in February 2009 and distributed by Anchor Bay Entertainment.

== Release ==
The film premiered at the 2010 Sundance Film Festival. It was released in North American theaters on February 5, 2010, with distribution from Anchor Bay Films.

While playing at Sundance, the film caused quite a stir with numerous faintings reported from audience members that could not handle the tension of the film. One such fainting happened at the Tower Theater in Salt Lake City. Frozen also opened the Glasgow FrightFest. On February 5, the film had multiple screens in areas in Boston, New York, Los Angeles, Salt Lake City, Dallas, Denver, Philadelphia, Minneapolis and Chicago.

The film premiered on February 5, 2010, with the entire cast and crew at Mann Chinese 6 on Hollywood Blvd.

=== Box office ===
Frozen opened to a first weekend box office of $131,395. It underperformed the following weeks. Internationally, the film earned over $2.4 million, bringing its total gross receipts to slightly less than $2.7 million. At its widest domestic release, it screened in 106 theaters.

=== Home media ===
The film was released on a single disc DVD and Blu-ray in the United States on September 28, 2010, and in the United Kingdom on October 18, 2010.

Bonus features include an audio commentary with writer/director Adam Green and the leads Shawn Ashmore, Kevin Zegers and Emma Bell; the documentaries "Catching Frostbite: The Origins of Frozen", "Three Below Zero", "Shooting Through It" and "Beating the Mountain: Surviving Frozen"; deleted scenes; and the official theatrical trailer. The Blu-ray features an exclusive commentary from Adam Green, cinematographer Will Barratt, and editor Ed Marx.

=== Soundtrack ===
A soundtrack album consisting of the film's complete score, composed by Andy Garfield, was released by 2M1 Records Group in January 2011. It is available in a limited pressed run of 500 copies signed by Garfield and Adam Green. The album was produced by George Fox. Additionally, it has been released on iTunes and Amazon as a download.

== Connection to Hatchet II ==
In Adam Green's subsequent film Hatchet II, released seven months after Frozen (also in 2010), Emma Bell appears in an uncredited cameo reprising her role as Parker O'Neal, in a scene serving as an epilogue to the main events of Frozen. In the scene, Parker is revealed to have successfully sued the ski resort for abandoning her, Dan, and Joe to the wolves, declaring that she will never go skiing again.

== Reception ==
=== Critical response ===
Rotten Tomatoes reports that 64% of 97 critics gave the film a positive review, with an average rating of 6.2/10. The site's critics consensus reads: "Writer/director Adam Green has the beginnings of an inventive, frightening yarn in Frozen, but neither the script nor the cast are quite strong enough to truly do it justice." On Metacritic has a weighted average score of 43 out of 100, based on 16 critics, indicating "mixed or average" reviews.

Critic Richard Roeper called the film "an entertaining, suspense-filled, sometimes wonderfully grotesque little scarefest", though The Hollywood Reporter commented that it "is not written, directed, or acted well enough to be a first-rate thriller". Jeannette Catsoulis of The New York Times made it a NYT Critics' Pick and wrote, "A minimalist setup delivers maximum fright in Frozen, a nifty little chiller that balances its cold terrain with an unexpectedly warm heart." Peter Debruge of Variety wrote, "Don’t be surprised if the movie’s most wince-inducing moments come not from the "disturbing images" (as the MPAA describes the sight of a leg bone sticking six inches out of one character's ski pants) but rather of the bad acting and worse dialogue."

=== Awards ===
It was nominated for a 2010 Saturn Award for Best Horror Film, losing to Drag Me to Hell.
