= Hatchet III =

- Theatrical release poster
- Directed by: B. J. McDonnell
- Written by: Adam Green
- Produced by: Sarah Elbert; Adam Green
- Starring: Danielle Harris; Caroline Williams; Zach Galligan; Derek Mears; Rileah Vanderbilt; Parry Shen; Kane Hodder
- Cinematography: Will Barratt
- Edited by: Ed Marx
- Music by: Scott Glasgow
- Production companies: Dark Sky Films; ArieScope Pictures
- Distributed by: Dark Sky Films
- Release date: June 14, 2013 (United States)
- Running time: 82 minutes
- Country: United States
- Language: English
- Budget: $1.2 million

Hatchet III is a 2013 American slasher film directed by B. J. McDonnell and written by Adam Green. It is the sequel to Hatchet II, and the third overall installment in the titular film series. Kane Hodder portrays the main antagonist Victor Crowley for the third time in a row, while Danielle Harris returns to play protagonist Marybeth Dunston.

== Plot ==
After apparently managing to kill Victor Crowley, Marybeth Dunston makes her way back into the city, bloodied and disoriented. She walks into the Jefferson Parish Police Department, where she is quickly put into custody due to her carrying Victor's scalp. Upon the discovery of the carnage at Honey Island Swamp, Marybeth is placed as the prime suspect for the murders by Sheriff Fowler, despite her swearing her innocence. Fowler heads out to the swamp with the paramedics and fire department, leaving Deputy Winslow in the station until he returns.

Amanda, Fowler's ex-wife, journalist, and an expert on the legend of Victor Crowley comes into the station to interview Marybeth. During the interview, Amanda tells Marybeth that Victor has been cursed to relive the same night repeatedly and will keep coming back unless he gets what he wants — his father, Thomas Crowley. She then tells Marybeth that she is the only one who can put an end to Victor since her bloodline connects her to her father, Sampson, who was involved in starting the house fire that killed Victor as a child.

At Honey Island Swamp, the body of Victor is bagged and put into a water ambulance. Suddenly, Victor reanimates and massacres most of the first response team, save for Fowler and a pair of paramedics, which includes Andrew. Upon hearing the carnage over the radio back at the station, Amanda convinces Deputy Winslow to let Marybeth out of jail and help her save those at the swamp.

Meanwhile, back at the swamp, a SWAT team led by Tyler Hawes takes over the operation from Fowler and is led to the Crowley house alongside a handful of deputies. Victor, however, is quickly able to kill nearly the entire squad, save for SWAT Officer Dougherty, Andrew, and Fowler, who manage to escape amidst the chaos. Meanwhile, Amanda, Winslow, and Marybeth obtain Thomas Crowley's ashes from Abbott MacMullen, Victor Crowley's racist distant cousin.

Andrew, Fowler, and Dougherty manage to outrun Victor and barricade themselves inside the water ambulance. Shortly after, however, Victor begins to saw his way through the boat wall with a belt sander. Meanwhile, Amanda, Winslow, and Marybeth arrive at the Swamp outside the burned-down Crowley house. Amanda calls out for Victor, telling him they have his father. Upon hearing Amanda's voice, Fowler expresses relief, only to be grabbed by Victor and killed with the belt sander. Victor also grabs Dougherty and pulls her through a sharp hole in the metallic door, which disembowels her, but Andrew manages to stay hidden and survive.

Victor goes back to his destroyed home and finds Amanda and Deputy Winslow there but refrains from attacking when he sees the ashes. Marybeth offers Victor his father's ashes and apologizes for what her father did to him. However, when Victor approaches to take the ashes, Deputy Winslow mistakes it for an attack and shoots him down. Victor rises back up and kills Winslow and Amanda out of rage before grabbing Marybeth and impaling her on a tree branch, severely wounding her. Before he can finish her off, however, Marybeth smashes the urn over Victor's head, covering him in his father's ashes and causing his body to melt. With her last bit of strength, Marybeth grabs one of the SWAT team's guns and blows his remains away before collapsing. The National Guard arrives, and Andrew, free of danger, emerges from the boat and signals the helicopters. Marybeth gasps for air as the screen cuts to black, leaving her fate unknown.

== Cast ==
- Danielle Harris as Marybeth Dunston
- Kane Hodder as Victor Crowley
- Caroline Williams as Amanda
- Zach Galligan as Sheriff Fowler
- Robert Diago DoQui as Deputy Winslow
- Rileah Vanderbilt as Dougherty
- Parry Shen as Andrew
- Derek Mears as Hawes
- Cody Blue Snider as Schneiderman
- Sean Whalen as Randy
- Diane Ayala Goldner as Elbert
- Jason Trost as Hamilton
- Sid Haig as Abbott McMullen
- John Michael Sudolt as Jim
- Joel David Moore as Ben (uncredited)

== Production ==
Hatchet II director Adam Green originally stated that two more sequels would follow. In 2011, Dark Sky gave the green light for Hatchet III. Green declined to helm the sequel himself, but still wrote, produced, presented, and retained creative control, having final cut over the film while hand-picking the director. Hatchet and Hatchet II cameraman BJ McDonnell took over for Green on the third film.

== Release ==
=== Theatrical ===
Hatchet III was first shown at Adam Green's fundraiser dedicated to the victims of the 2013 Boston bombings and the film was released in theaters and Video On Demand on June 14, 2013.

=== Home media ===
A home media release followed later in 2013.

== Reception ==
=== Critical response ===
Hatchet III received mixed reviews from critics. Based on 22 reviews collected by Rotten Tomatoes, Hatchet III has a 59% approval rating with an average score of 4.9 out of 10. The site's consensus reads: "Way to bury the lede -- or rather Hatchet III, as this hacked and staggering sequel crawls its way to the bloody end". Metacritic gave the film an average score of 25 out of 100, based on 8 reviews.

== Sequel ==
In August 2017, it was announced that a fourth Hatchet film was secretly filmed and completed, and would be released in October as Victor Crowley. Directed by Adam Green, the film takes place ten years after the events of the first three films, with Kane Hodder reprising his role as Victor Crowley and Parry Shen reprising his role as Hatchet III survivor Andrew Yong. The film was shown in select U.S. theaters as part of Dark Sky Films' "Victor Crowley Road Show" event in celebration of the first film's ten-year anniversary as well as international film festivals. A teaser trailer was released the day after the film was announced.
