= Fateful Findings =

2012 film directed by Neil Breen

- Theatrical release poster
- Directed by: Neil Breen
- Written by: Neil Breen
- Produced by: Neil Breen
- Starring: Neil Breen; Jennifer Autry; Klara Landrat; Danielle Andrade
- Edited by: Brian Mills; Neil Breen
- Music by: Neil Breen
- Production company: Neil Breen Films, LLC
- Distributed by: Panorama Entertainment
- Release dates: December 8, 2012 (Butt-Numb-A-Thon); January 18, 2014 (United States)
- Running time: 100 minutes
- Country: United States
- Language: English

Fateful Findings is a 2012 American independent science fiction thriller film directed, written, produced, edited by, and starring Neil Breen, who was also in charge of production design, set decoration, makeup, sound editing, catering, and casting.

The film was screened on December 8, 2012, at the invite-only Butt-Numb-A-Thon, had a public festival debut on May 23, 2013, at the Seattle International Film Festival, and was released to theaters on January 18, 2014.

Upon release, it was declared one of the worst films ever made and quickly gained a cult following. Among other things, viewers cite the film's cryptic and incomprehensible plot, poor production values, overt political messages, stilted dialogue, and bizarre and unnatural performance by Breen, as well as his real-life eccentricities, as part of the film's ironic appeal. Some critics have cited the film as an example of outsider art and the phenomenon of "so bad it's good" media.

== Plot ==
Eight-year-olds Dylan and Leah discover a magical black stone in the woods. With Leah's family's departure imminent, the two vow to always be friends but never see each other again.

Decades later, Dylan, now a successful novelist, is struck by a car. Prior to the paramedics' arrival, the woman, who was a passenger, exits her car to briefly check on Dylan as he is unconsciously grasping for the stone before driving away. Once in the hospital, he rapidly heals from his injuries, which he credits to the power of the stone. Returning home, Dylan reveals to his wife, Emily, that he has not been working on a new book but has instead been using his hacking abilities to uncover "the most secret government and corporate secrets", which he plans to publish in an exposé. His commitment to the project is tested by his wife's descent into drug addiction and eventual overdose, as well as the constant sexual attention paid to him by his best friend Jim's underage daughter Aly.

Plagued by disturbing dreams of a mystical book, Dylan begins seeing a psychologist, who helps him unearth repressed childhood memories. Doing so causes Dylan to realize that the doctor who attended to him during his recovery from the car accident was an adult Leah. The two are reunited, quickly beginning a sexual relationship. Meanwhile, Jim is murdered by his wife Amy for valuing working on his car over listening to her issues. Distraught, she stages his death as a suicide. Discovering Jim's lifeless body, Dylan cannot believe Jim has ended his own life, and is unable to help him.

Learning about Dylan's plans to publish the exposé, a mysterious assailant kidnaps Leah. Using psychic powers granted to him by the stone, Dylan rescues her by teleporting into the kidnapper's compound. He then travels to the desert to find the book he sees in his dream. Visiting his psychologist one last time, Dylan learns that she is, in fact, a ghost. Dylan publishes his book, hosting a press conference in front of the National Archives Building divulging "the most secret government and corporate secrets". Various members of Congress and corporate executives react to the speech by committing suicide to applause from the audience. A camouflaged sniper attempts to assassinate him only for Dylan to kill him by reflecting the bullet using his psychic powers. His mission complete, Dylan and Leah return to the place where they found the stone in the woods as children.

== Cast ==
- Neil Breen as Dylan
  - Jack Batoni as young Dylan
- Jennifer Autry as Leah
  - Brianna Borden as young Leah
- Klara Landrat as Emily
- Danielle Andrade as Aly
- Victoria Viveiros as Amy
- David Silva as Jim

== Production ==
=== Development and financing ===
Breen has said that, as with his earlier features, he self-financed Fateful Findings entirely with savings from his parallel career as a licensed architect, explaining that “the only way I’ll make movies is to finance them myself - if I waited for investors, they’d never get made.” To keep the micro-budget under control, Breen wrote the screenplay around locations and props he already owned, then took on nearly every crew function himself - from production design and sound to catering - while still paying all cast and crew union-day rates. Las Vegas public-radio critic Josh Bell notes that Breen's do-it-yourself model has allowed him to retain worldwide rights and sell DVDs directly, making the film “profitable on its own weird terms despite no traditional home-video deal.” Paste Magazine later characterised Breen's approach as "egosploitation" - cinema made outside the industry in which the filmmaker “writes the check, plays the messiah and prints the DVDs at home,” but still manages to turn a small profit via niche theatrical bookings and direct sales.

=== Filming ===
==== Locations and schedule ====
Principal photography took place entirely in and around Las Vegas, Nevada, during late 2012. Breen shot in his own house, rented office suites and nearby desert scrubland, deliberately avoiding skyline shots so the setting would feel “mythic” and placeless. Local alt-weekly Cleveland Scene reported that the movie's entire shoot lasted “a few hectic weeks,” calling the production “primitive, low-budget - and utterly hypnotic.”

==== Crew and equipment ====
According to the Seattle International Film Festival's technical notes, Breen shot on prosumer HD digital cameras with natural or practical lighting, relying on a three-person camera-and-sound team and hiring Nevada-based actors through local casting calls. Bell observes that Breen's films “rarely leave anonymous office parks and cul-de-sacs,” noting that Fateful Findings relies heavily on green-screen composites for the climactic press-conference scene in front of the U.S. National Archives Building.

==== Aesthetic choices ====
Festival programmer Clinton McClung described the finished film as “genre-defying outsider art” whose rough-hewn visuals stem directly from Breen's one-man-band production style rather than from any attempt at parody. Reviewers have highlighted the film's pervasive use of day-for-night filters, single-take dialogue scenes and lingering reaction shots, all of which McClung says “add to the dreamlike, inadvertent Lynchian atmosphere.”

==== Cast and community involvement ====
All performers were recruited locally, and Breen told interviewers that he looks for “faces with character” rather than trained actors, casting via Nevada talent boards and Craigslist to stay within budget. Despite the shoestring resources, Breen insisted on paying SAG-equivalent day rates rather than deferrals, arguing that professional standards were essential even on a micro-budget shoot.

== Release ==
After Breen generated buzz and a cult following with his previous films, Fateful Findings played at Harry Knowles' 2012 Butt-Numb-A-Thon, an invite-only film festival. It played at the Seattle International Film Festival's Midnight Adrenaline program on May 23, 2013. The festival's programmer, Clinton McClung, said that he chose the film despite its amateurishness because of its uniqueness and cult appeal. The film had its International debut at the Fantasia International Film Festival on July 20, 2013, before playing during Cinefamily's Everything Is Festival event on August 17, 2013, the Arizona Underground Film Festival on September 14, 2013, and the Three Rivers Film Festival on November 11, 2013. Panorama Entertainment subsequently distributed it in the U.S. on January 18, 2014.

== Reception ==
Alan Jones of The Dissolve wrote that the film could only have been made by Breen, as his incompetence makes what could have been boring instead fascinating. Peter K. of Twitch Film wrote, "It's not just for enjoying hilarious incompetence, more purely it is for the act of watching eccentric choices made by even more eccentric people."

Fateful Findings has become a cult film. Describing why he thinks it deserves to be a cult film, Nathan Rabin called the film outsider art as unpredictable and unconventional as Citizen Kane.

Jason Howard of INLUX Magazine began his interview of Breen by praising the film, writing "Ever on the hunt for the next great 'cult classic', I recently stumbled upon Fateful Findings" and "it only took about a minute into the film for me to discover that I was watching something special that had more to offer than the typical film".

== See also ==
- List of 21st century films considered the worst
