= Grow Up, Tony Phillips =

- Promotional release poster
- Directed by: Emily Hagins
- Written by: Emily Hagins
- Produced by: Paul Gandersman; Peter S. Hall
- Starring: Trevon D. Anderson; Caleb Barwick; Emmet Barwick
- Cinematography: Gray Haddock
- Edited by: Shane Gibson; Luke Mullen
- Music by: Christopher Thomas
- Production companies: Cheesy Nuggets Productions; Arcanum Pictures; Angry Piñata
- Distributed by: Vanguard Cinema
- Release date: October 31, 2013 (SXSW)
- Running time: 90 minutes
- Country: United States
- Language: English
- Budget: $75,000

Grow Up, Tony Phillips is a 2013 comedy film by American director Emily Hagins and her fourth feature film. It was first released on October 31, 2013, at the South by Southwest film festival and stars Tony Vespe as Tony Phillips, a young teenager's love for Halloween. Unlike her prior feature-length films, Grow Up, Tony Phillips does not feature any supernatural elements seen in past films such as Pathogen or My Sucky Teen Romance.

== Synopsis ==
Tony (Tony Vespe) is conflicted. He loves Halloween, but this year all of his high school friends have decided that Halloween is too juvenile for him. What is Tony to do when nobody his age really understands what Halloween means to him?

== Cast ==
- Tony Vespe as Tony Phillips
- Caleb Barwick as Mikey
- Devin Bonnée as Craig
- A. J. Bowen as Pete
- Seth Lee as Brian Cooper
- Byron Brown as Gary
- Janet Travis as Claire
- Korey Coleman as Principal Blackman
- Arthur Dale as Young Tony
- Katie Folger as Elle
- Tanner Fontana as Young Craig
- Catherine Ann Hicks as Trick-or-Treater
- Trevon D. Anderson as Trick-or-Treater
- Emmet Barwick as Trick-or-Treater
- Paris Cudini as Trick-or-Treater
- Hunter Cudini as Trick-or-Treater
- Alyssa Michelle Jimenez as Teenage Partier, Dance Crowd

== Production ==
Funding for Grow Up, Tony Phillips was partially raised through a successful Kickstarter campaign, which raised $75,000. While writing the script, Hagins wanted to focus on the transition between adult and child that occurs with Halloween, which she felt was often overlooked in many films. The script was a departure the genre from her previous films, as the dark tones depressed her and Hagins wanted to "a movie that had no genre at all". In 2012 A. J. Bowen was confirmed to be performing in the film. Filming began in mid-November 2012 in Austin, Texas. Hagins experienced some difficulty with shooting, as some businesses already had Christmas decorations up but decided to work them into the script as a plot point.

== Reception ==
Critical reception for Grow Up, Tony Phillips was mostly positive. Common criticisms revolved around the film's storytelling, as some reviewers such as Film School Rejects felt that there were "some serious story elements that are left dangling in all but the most superficial ways", which interfered with a film that they otherwise enjoyed. Hagins received praise for the film's acting and for what the Daily Texan saw as "genuine truths about how high school can dissolve the most intense friendships". Vox and Twitch Film both gave mostly positive reviews, with Twitch Film praising the movie's cinematography and film score.

== See also ==
- List of films set around Halloween
