= Trick 'r Treat =

2007 anthology film by Michael Dougherty

- Theatrical release poster
- Directed by: Michael Dougherty
- Written by: Michael Dougherty
- Produced by: Bryan Singer
- Starring: Dylan Baker; Rochelle Aytes; Anna Paquin; Brian Cox
- Cinematography: Glen MacPherson
- Edited by: Robert Ivison
- Music by: Douglas Pipes
- Production companies: Legendary Pictures; Bad Hat Harry Productions (Note: Warner Bros. Pictures and Legendary Pictures serve as co-financiers and co-production companies for Trick 'r Treat, while Bad Hat Harry Productions is credited as the production company.)
- Distributed by: Warner Bros. Pictures (Note: Released under the Warner Premiere label for the film's home media release.)
- Release dates: December 9, 2007 (Butt-Numb-A-Thon); October 6, 2009 (United States)
- Running time: 82 minutes
- Country: United States
- Language: English
- Budget: $12 million
- Box office: $27,909

Trick 'r Treat is a 2007 American comedy horror anthology film written and directed by Michael Dougherty (in his directorial debut) and produced by Bryan Singer. The film stars Dylan Baker, Rochelle Aytes, Anna Paquin, and Brian Cox. It relates four Halloween horror stories with a common element in them: Sam, a trick-or-treating demon wearing orange footie pajamas with a burlap sack over his head, who appears in each story whenever one of the other characters breaks a Halloween tradition.

Trick 'r Treat premiered at the Butt-Numb-A-Thon on December 9, 2007, and had other festival play and limited theatrical screenings before being released on DVD and Blu-ray by Warner Bros. Pictures on October 6, 2009.

== Plot ==
The film takes place on Halloween night in the fictional town of Warren Valley, Ohio. The plot follows a nonlinear narrative, with characters crossing paths throughout the film. At the center of the story is Sam, a peculiar trick-or-treater in an orange footie pajama costume, who appears to enforce the "rules" of Halloween.

=== Opening ===
Emma and her Halloween-loving husband Henry return home after a celebratory night. Emma, who secretly hates Halloween, blows out their jack-o'-lantern before midnight against Henry's advice. As Henry falls asleep in the house, Emma tears down the decorations, but is murdered by an unseen assailant. Hours later, Henry discovers Emma's mutilated corpse on display with the decorations.

=== Principal ===
Delinquent Charlie vandalizes jack-o'-lanterns and steals candy from unattended bowls. School principal Steven Wilkins offers Charlie a candy bar while lecturing him on the importance of respecting Halloween traditions. As Charlie vomits profusely and dies, Steven, who is in fact a serial killer, reveals that he poisoned the candy. Steven buries Charlie's body in his backyard along with the body of another victim. Returning indoors, Steven notices his cantankerous elderly neighbor Kreeg in distress, but brushes it off before something attacks Kreeg. Steven guides his young Halloween-loving son Billy downstairs to carve a jack-o'-lantern, which is revealed to be Charlie's severed head.

=== Halloween School Bus Massacre ===
Teenage trick-or-treaters Macy, Chip, Schrader, and Sara meet devout Halloween traditionalist Rhonda. Macy leads the group to a flooded quarry and recounts the urban legend of the "Halloween School Bus Massacre". The parents of eight mentally disabled children bribed their school bus driver to dispose of them. While trying to escape, one of the children accidentally drove the bus off a cliff into the quarry. The children all drowned, and the driver who survived was never heard from again.

Macy leaves eight jack-o'-lanterns by the lake as a tribute to the deceased. As the group splits up, Rhonda is pursued by horrifying figures, which turn out to be the other teens in disguise, a prank orchestrated by Macy. The actual drowned children emerge from the lake as zombies and attack the teens, killing Sara. Rhonda abandons the rest to their deaths as revenge for their prank and for breaking Halloween traditions. As she leaves, Rhonda encounters Sam and exchanges a look with him.

=== Surprise Party ===
Laurie, a self-conscious 22-year-old virgin and devout Halloween traditionalist from out of town, dresses up as Little Red Riding Hood and joins her older sister Danielle and friends Maria and Janet for Halloween. While the other girls pick up dates and head to a bonfire party in the woods, Laurie stays behind and enjoys the town festival instead. Later, on the way to meet up with her friends, she is attacked by a man in a vampire costume. Laurie arrives at the girls' bonfire with the injured and frightened "vampire", who turns out to be a disguised Steven Wilkins.

Under the full moon, the girls all shed their clothing and skin, grow fur with claws and tails, as their heads become lupine, revealing themselves to be werewolves. Having chosen Steven as her first kill (her "virginity" being a metaphor for having never killed before), someone "special", Laurie also transforms and kills Steven before devouring him. Sam watches as the werewolves feast on their deceased dates.

=== Sam ===
At his home, Mr. Kreeg, a curmudgeonly Halloween hater, is attacked by Sam. In their struggle, Kreeg unmasks his assailant, whose head resembles a grotesque hybrid of a skull and a jack-o'-lantern. Kreeg shoots Sam several times with a shotgun, but Sam incapacitates and corners Kreeg, who fails to get Steven to help him. When Sam tries to stab Kreeg, he instead hits a candy bar which had fallen on the old man's lap. With this, Kreeg accidentally "gives" the candy to Sam, completing the tradition of handing out treats on Halloween. Satisfied, Sam spares a confused Kreeg and departs. Photographs burning in the fireplace reveal that Kreeg was the missing driver from the School Bus Massacre.

=== Conclusion ===
A heavily bandaged Kreeg gives candy to trick-or-treaters and witnesses other people upholding Halloween traditions. Billy sits on his father's porch while handing out candy, Rhonda casually pulls along a wagon filled with jack-o'-lanterns, and Laurie and her friends drive by while laughing to each other.

After Emma and Henry arrive home, Sam sees Emma prematurely extinguishing the jack-o'-lantern and prepares to kill her as punishment. Kreeg is visited by the undead children from the bus, who show up trick-or-treating before they brutally dismember him.

== Cast ==
- Dylan Baker as Steven
- Rochelle Aytes as Maria
- Quinn Lord as Sam / Peeping Tommy
- Lauren Lee Smith as Danielle
- Moneca Delain as Janet
- Tahmoh Penikett as Henry
- Brett Kelly as Charlie
- Britt McKillip as Macy
- Isabelle Deluce as Sara
- Jean-Luc Bilodeau as Schrader
- Alberto Ghisi as Chip
- Samm Todd as Rhonda
- Anna Paquin as Laurie
- Brian Cox as Mr. Kreeg
- Leslie Bibb as Emma
- Connor Levins as Billy
- James Willson as Alex
- Patrick Gilmore as Bud the cameraman
- C. Ernst Harth as Giant Baby
- Christine Willes as Mrs. Henderson
- Richard Harmon as Vampire Kid
- Laura Mennell as Allie

== Production ==
Season's Greetings is an animated short created by Trick 'r Treat writer and director Michael Dougherty in 1996, and was the precursor of the film. The film featured Sam as a little boy dressed in orange footy pajamas with his burlap sack head covering, as he is being stalked by a stranger on Halloween night. The short was released as a DVD extra on the original release for Trick 'r Treat and was aired on FEARnet in October 2013 as part of a 24-hour Trick 'r Treat marathon on Halloween.

"The Halloween School Bus Massacre" segment initially took place in a graveyard and had the kids luring the girl to play with them. It was going to be revealed that they were all ghosts and that the girl had forgotten she was one of them. Dougherty ultimately had to rewrite the whole segment because he felt that the twist of someone being dead all along had become an overused trope. Trick 'r Treat was filmed on location in Vancouver, British Columbia. Originally slated for an October 5, 2007, theatrical release, it was announced in September 2007 that the film had been pushed back. After many festival screenings, it was released on home media in 2009.

== Release ==
The first public screening took place at Harry Knowles' Butt-Numb-A-Thon film festival in Austin, Texas, on December 9, 2007. Subsequent screenings included the Sitges Film Festival on October 7, 2008, the 2008 Screamfest Horror Film Festival on October 10, 2008 and a free screening in New York City sponsored by Fangoria on October 13, 2008. Another free screening, co-sponsored by Ain't It Cool News and Legendary Pictures, was held on October 23, 2008, at Grauman's Chinese Theatre in Hollywood, featuring a Q&A with Michael Dougherty and a costume contest judged by him. The film was also screened at the 2009 San Diego Comic-Con, the Fantasia Festival on July 29 and 30, 2009, the film festival Terror in the Aisles 2 in Chicago on August 15, 2009, and the Toronto After Dark Film Festival on August 20, 2009, at the Bloor.

Trick 'r Treat grossed $27,909 in the United Kingdom.

In 2022, 15 years after its first public screening, Trick 'r Treat was released in the United States in Regal Cinemas on October 6 and in select AMC Theatres on October 21, marking the film's first nationwide theatrical release.

=== Home media ===
Warner Bros. Pictures released the film on DVD and Blu-ray in North America on October 6, 2009, in the UK on October 26, and in Australia on October 28. Shout! Factory released a "Collector's Edition" Blu-ray on October 9, 2018, with all extras from previous DVD/Blu-ray releases included as well as new extra content. Arrow Films released a limited 4K UHD Blu-ray edition of the film on October 29, 2024.

== Marketing ==
=== Comic books ===
DC Comics partner Wildstorm Comics had planned to release a four-issue adaptation of Trick 'r Treat written by Marc Andreyko and illustrated by Fiona Staples, with covers by Michael Dougherty, Breehn Burns and Ragnar. The series was originally going to be released weekly in October 2007, ending on Halloween, but the series was pushed back due to the film's backlisting. The four comics were instead released as a graphic novel adaptation in October 2009. Legendary Comics set the second Trick 'r Treat comic book, titled Trick 'r Treat: Days of the Dead, for an October 2015 release date, and features Arts of Artist Fiona Staples and Stephen Byrne. The comic was released alongside the graphic novel tie-in of Dougherty's Krampus.

== Reception ==
On the review aggregator website Rotten Tomatoes, 86% of 43 critics' reviews are positive, with an average rating of 7.5/10. The website's consensus reads: "A deftly crafted tribute to Halloween legends, Trick 'r' Treat [sic] hits all the genre marks with gusto and old-fashioned suspense."

Dread Central gave it five out of five stars, stating: "Trick 'r Treat ranks alongside John Carpenter's Halloween as traditional October viewing and I can't imagine a single horror fan that won't fall head over heels in love with it." The film earned ten out of ten from Ryan Rotten of ShockTilYouDrop.com.

IGN called it a "very well-crafted Halloween horror tribute" and "a scary blast", rating it a score of eight out of ten. Bloody Disgusting ranked the film ninth in their list of the "Top 20 Horror Films of the Decade", calling it "so good that its lack of a theatrical release borders on the criminal." Jeffrey M. Anderson of Common Sense Media rated the film four stars out of five, stating that horror anthologies "rarely work as well as this one does, with its brisk pacing and excellent casting, and its alluring combination of prankish humor and sincere dread." He also noted that it's "admirable how beautifully the stories twist and flow and snap together, most with little tricks and twist endings that reference other parts of the movie." Jim Vorel of Paste magazine praised the characters' "different social castes and age groups" and, overall, called it "one of the most purely entertaining horror films of the 2000s."

=== Awards ===
- 2008 – Audience Choice Award, Screamfest Horror Film Festival
- 2009 – Silver Audience Award, Toronto After Dark Film Festival

== Possible sequel ==
Dougherty announced in October 2009 that he was planning a sequel, but later stated that there was "no active development nor an attempt at a pitch." A sequel was announced in October 2013, but there was a change in Legendary's management. Dougherty has continued to express interest in a sequel but said the film stands on its own.

In October 2022, Dougherty revealed that he was in "active development" of a sequel with Legendary Pictures, although the film had not been officially greenlit yet. In October 2023, Dougherty confirmed that several screenplay drafts were complete, confirming that progress had only recently continued due to the end of the 2023 Writers Guild of America strike. He also clarified that he hoped to be looking at budgetary and scheduling concerns afterward; while also stating: "I mean, I love all of our favorite horror franchise characters as much as any of us, but not all of them are great. And I know we've grown to love even the lesser chapters of our favorite horror series. There's always a cheese value to them, but if I'm gonna do a sequel, I want it to be as good if not better than the original, and good things take time. The last thing I would want is to see Trick 'r Treat Part 9: Sam Goes to Space, you know? Although that does have potential, I will say."

== See also ==
- List of films set around Halloween
