= Derek Mears =

American actor and stuntman (born 1972)

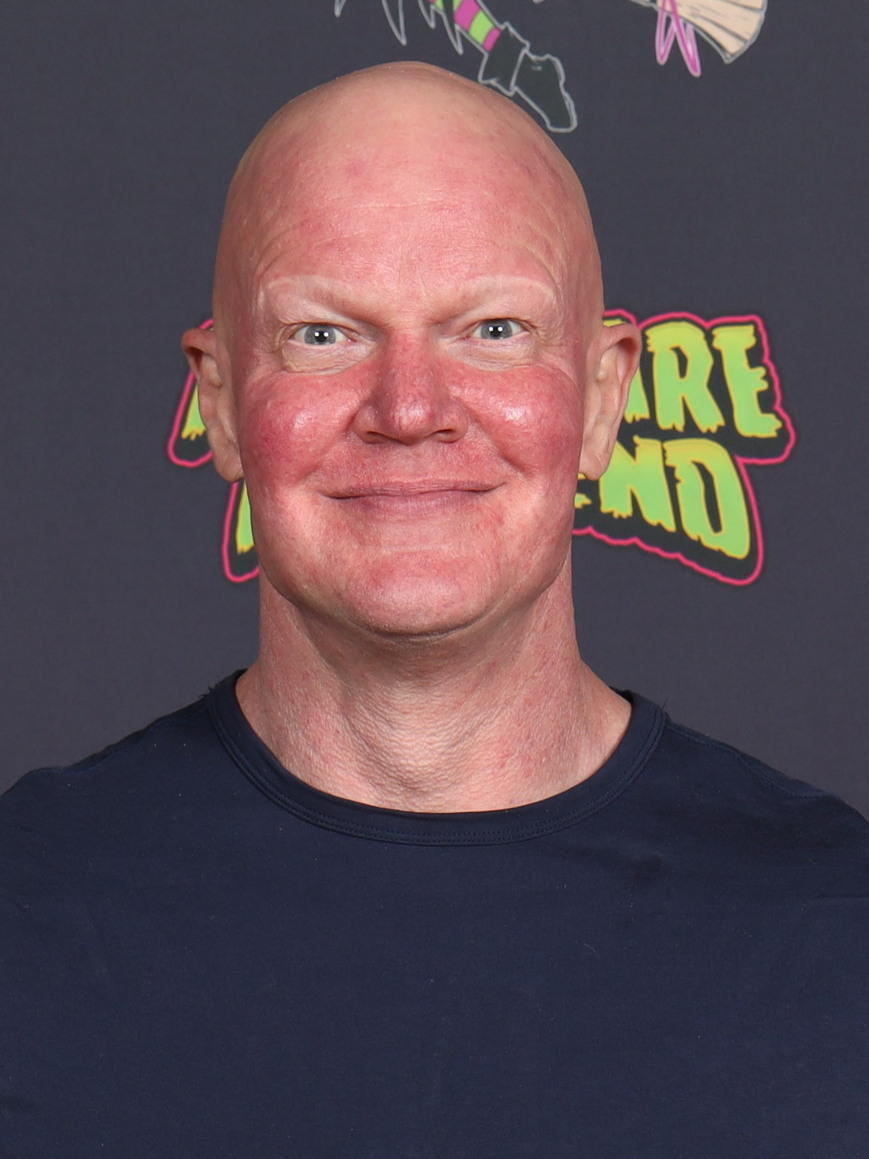
- Mears in 2024
- Born: April 29, 1972 (age 54); Bakersfield, California, U.S.
- Occupations: Actor; stuntman
- Years active: 1995–present
- Spouse: Jennifer Flack (2008-2012)

Derek Mears (born April 29, 1972) is an American actor and stuntman. Often appearing in horror and science-fiction titles, he came to prominence for portraying Jason Voorhees in the 2009 reboot of Friday the 13th. His film roles also include The Hills Have Eyes 2 (2007), Predators (2010), Pirates of the Caribbean: On Stranger Tides (2011), Hansel & Gretel: Witch Hunters (2013), and Alita: Battle Angel (2019). On television, he played the title character on the DC Universe series Swamp Thing (2019).

== Early life ==
Mears was born on April 29, 1972, in Bakersfield, California. He performed improv comedy at ComedySportz in Bakersfield. He graduated from Highland High School in Bakersfield in 1990. Early on in life, Mears had a severe case of the auto-immune disease alopecia universalis, causing him to lose almost all his body hair.

== Career ==
Mears has numerous credits both as a stuntman and as an actor. He had minor roles in The Tick, ER, Alias, Nash Bridges, Men in Black II, The Shield, CSI: NY, My Name Is Earl, Mr. & Mrs Smith, CSI: Miami, Community, and The Hills Have Eyes 2. His stunt credits include the films Pirates of the Caribbean: The Curse of the Black Pearl, Pirates of the Caribbean: Dead Man's Chest, Indiana Jones and the Kingdom of the Crystal Skull and Blades of Glory, and TV series such as Angel and Bones.

Mears had his breakthrough lead role in the 2009 Friday the 13th film. He was recommended to the producers, Brad Fuller and Andrew Form of Platinum Dunes, by make-up and special effects guru Scott Stoddard, who created the new look for Mears' character, Jason Voorhees. Due to Mears' height at 6 ft 5 in (1.96 m) he is one of the tallest actors who have portrayed Jason, beside Ken Kirzinger, who stands at a similar height to Mears. He was nominated for an MTV Movie Award in the category for Best Villain for his portrayal of Voorhees, but lost to Heath Ledger as the Joker in The Dark Knight.

Mears did a lot of research on child development to flesh out the role of Camp Crystal Lake's notorious resident serial killer:

In the script, Jason watches his mother die in front of him. So I did research on, when you're that age how do your cognitive processes happen? How is the child supposed to be developing? I found out that at that age you're starting to be integrating into society, whether it's through group sports or group activities so that you find out you're not alone. I discovered that he missed that aspect. He was already an outcast from society for looking different and being disfigured, and his only connection to love and reality is his mother.

He is contracted to return for either another Friday the 13th sequel or another film by Platinum Dunes. If Mears reprises his role as Jason, he will be only the second person to portray the character more than once, next to Kane Hodder. On June 5, 2013, it was reported that Warner Bros. had relinquished their film rights to the Friday the 13th series to Paramount as part of a deal that allowed Warner Bros. to co-produce Interstellar. One week later, Mears revealed that Paramount was working with Platinum Dunes to make a new installment "as fast as possible". Since the plans has changed in the thirteenth Friday the 13th film titled Jason (2027), as Mears was replaced by Schuyler White, playing the title character.

He portrayed a Predator in the 2010 science fiction horror film sequel Predators.

Mears appeared in Ultraforce 2 on the Superego podcast. He also appeared in the American sitcom Community in the episode "Romantic Expressionism". He appeared as a zombie, credited as "Master-at-Arms", in Pirates of the Caribbean: On Stranger Tides.

Mears appeared with other horror actor Tyler Mane of Rob Zombie's Halloween in Compound Fracture, released in 2013.

In a series of adverts for the insurance company Direct Line shown in 2021, Mears portrayed the character RoboCop.

== Filmography ==
Year	Title	Role	Notes
1995	The Demolitionist	Chuck X	
1999	Wild Wild West	"Metal Head"/Stunts	
2003	Pirates of the Caribbean: The Curse of the Black Pearl	Cursed crew member	
2004	The Shield	Crazyhouse	TV series (one episode)
2004	E.R.	Joseph	TV series (one episode)
2005	Cursed	Werewolf	Minor role
2005	Zathura: A Space Adventure	Lead Zorgon	
2006	The Hills Have Eyes	Larry	
2006	Pirates of the Caribbean: Dead Man's Chest	Assistant of Davy Jones	
2006	Pro-Life	The Father	
2007	Blades of Glory	Josh	Cameo
2007	The Hills Have Eyes 2	Chameleon	Minor role
2008	Semi-Pro	Himself	
2008	Resident Evil: Degeneration	Curtis Miller/G	
2009	Friday the 13th	Jason Voorhees	Lead role
2009	His Name Was Jason: 30 Years of Friday the 13th	Himself	Documentary film
2010	Predators	Classic Predator	Lead role
2010–2011	Community	Kickpuncher	Episodes: "Intro to Political Science" "Romantic Expressionism"
2011	Pirates of the Caribbean: On Stranger Tides	Master-at-Arms	
2011	Arena	Brutus Jackson	
2013	Hansel and Gretel: Witch Hunters	Edward	
2013	Percy Jackson: Sea of Monsters	Cyclops	
2013	Truth In Journalism	Bullseye	
2013	Hatchet III	Tyler Hawes	
2013	Crystal Lake Memories: The Complete History of Friday the 13th	Himself	Documentary film
2013–2014	Comedy Bang! Bang!	Irate Fan / Executioner / Mr. Hellman	Episodes: "Pee Wee Herman Wears a Halloween Costume" "Patton Oswalt Wears a Black Blazer & Dress Shoes" "Lizzy Caplan Wears All Black & Powder Blue Espadrilles"
2013	Grimm	Krampus	Episode: Twelve Days of Krampus
2014	Dead Snow 2: Red vs. Dead	Stavarin	
2014	Mighty Med	Catastrophe	Episode: There's a Storm Coming
2014	Lost Time	Mr. Elliot	PsyTerror / Aliens
2014	Teenage Mutant Ninja Turtles	Dojo Ninja	
2015	Freaks of Nature	Wolf	
2016	Popstar: Never Stop Never Stopping	Limo Driver	
2016	Live by Night	Donnie Gishler	
2016	Red vs. Blue	Ruben Lozano	Voice (web series); Episodes: "Call" "Consequences"
2016	RWBY	Corsac Albain	Voice; Web series Episode: "Menagerie"
2016	Phantasm: Ravager	Tall Dwarf	Deleted Scene
2017	From Jennifer	Butch Valentine	
2017	Twin Peaks	Renzo	TV series
2017	Agents of S.H.I.E.L.D.	Kree Captain	Episode: "Orientation: Part 1"
2018	The Flash	Sylbert Rundine / Dwarfstar	Episodes: "Honey I Shrunk Team Flash" "True Colors"
2019	Alita: Battle Angel	Romo	
2019	Swamp Thing	Swamp Thing	Main role
2020	Legends of Tomorrow	Swamp Thing	Cameo, "Crisis on Infinite Earths, Part 5"
2022	The Guardians of Justice	Awesome Man	TV series
2024	'Salem's Lot	Hubert Marsten	
2025	Shelby Oaks	Tarion	

== Awards and nominations ==
Year	Award	Category	Nominated work	Result
2009	MTV Movie & TV Awards	Best Villain	Friday the 13th	Nominated
2009	Screen Actors Guild Awards	Outstanding Performance by a Stunt Ensemble in a Motion Picture ((shared with the stunt cast)	Indiana Jones and the Kingdom of the Crystal Skull	Nominated
