= Neil Breen =

American filmmaker and actor

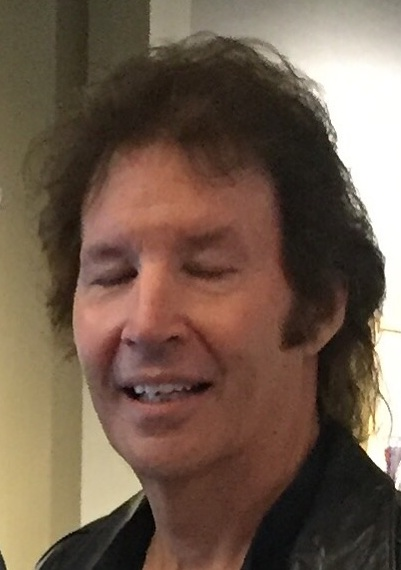
- Breen in 2017
- Born: United States
- Occupations: Filmmaker; Actor; Architect
- Known for: Fateful Findings (2012); Twisted Pair (2018); Cade: The Tortured Crossing (2023)

Neil Breen is an American architect, filmmaker and actor. Since 2005, he has made seven feature films in which he acts as director, writer, producer and lead star, while being in charge of most other key crew positions. He usually finances his films himself independently from his earnings as a professional architect, using amateur casts and crews.

Breen's works have garnered a cult following as "so bad it's good" films, often being singled out for their poor acting (notably from Breen), bizarre story and dialogue, offbeat editing and low-budget production values; his stories are typically psychological thrillers or science fiction with strong social commentary depicting lonely, tragic heroes in grandiose struggles against corrupt institutions. He has been compared to Tommy Wiseau.

== Life and career ==
Breen grew up on the East Coast of the United States and developed an interest in film and filmmaking at an early age. He studied architecture and initially became a licensed architect in California. He gained a small following after releasing his first film, Double Down, which played at the Cinefamily cinematheque in Los Angeles in 2010. In the years that followed, Breen continued working as an architect as a means to finance his next film: I Am Here.... Now, which also played at the Cinefamily in 2011. Since then, he has established a reputation as a cult amateur filmmaker. He has claimed to have recruited his cast from Craigslist ads.

=== Film ===
Breen writes, produces, directs, and stars in each of his own films. The characters he portrays hold advanced and often superhuman abilities and use them in grandiose struggles against corrupt forces and institutions. Fateful Findings features Breen as a hacker imbued with supernatural powers by a magical stone he found as a child, who uses his skills to expose government and corporate corruption, while in Double Down he plays a rogue CIA agent.

In other films, his protagonist is a god-like, messianic, or otherwise chosen figure; Pass Thru, for example, has Breen playing a messianic entity who arrives from the future to wipe out 300 million "bad people" to usher in a new era of peace. Breen has said that his films have a "sense of social responsibility" and reflect the "mystical or paranormal side of life."

Some critics have compared Breen's films to outsider art. Breen's third film, Fateful Findings, was compared to Tommy Wiseau's The Room by the former film's North American distributor Panorama Entertainment. Breen's fifth feature film, Twisted Pair, was released in October 2018. On December 16, 2022, Breen confirmed his sixth film is a sequel to Twisted Pair, titled Cade: The Tortured Crossing. In February 2023, Cade: The Tortured Crossing won the award for "Best Fantasy Film" and "People's Choice Award" at the Hollywood Reel Independent Film Festival, before its world premiere on February 25, 2023, at the Regal Cinemas L.A. Live. After its world premiere, Cade: The Tortured Crossing screened at Alamo Drafthouse locations across the country.

On May 17, 2024, Breen announced via Twitter that he has begun to write a script for his new film, claiming it is "totally different than his previous films." On December 4, Breen confirmed he is still writing his next film, saying it is "going great". On January 1, 2025, Breen confirmed it will be his seventh feature film and will begin filming that year. Filming began by April 30, 2025, and wrapped by June 9, 2025. Post-production finished on September 25, 2025, with Breen confirming the film had been sent to film festivals. The film was revealed to be Dire Duplicity, and released in 2026. The film had its world premiere during the Los Angeles Film Festival at the Regal Cinemas L.A. Live on May 15, 2026. It had a public theatrical rollout in several Alamo Drafthouse Cinemas on September 5 and 10, 2026.

=== Influence ===
His first feature film, Double Down, was featured on RedLetterMedia's Best of the Worst online series, while Fateful Findings was covered by RedLetterMedia along with other film critics on YouTube. Since then, Breen's films have been picked up by arthouse theaters and film festivals, including the 2012 "Butt-Numb-A-Thon" and the 2013 Seattle International Film Festival. In Jim Vorel's 2014 list of the 100 best B movies for Paste magazine, Breen's film I Am Here.... Now was ranked 21st, with Vorel mentioning that Breen could one day earn a place in the "terrible movie hall of fame" alongside Ed Wood and Wiseau.

== Filmography ==
Year	Title	Director	Writer	Producer	Editor	Musical Director	DOP	Actor	Role	Notes
2005	Double Down	Yes	Yes	Yes	Yes	Yes	No	Yes	Aaron Brand	Also casting, production designer, production manager, and catering
2009	I Am Here.... Now	Yes	Yes	Yes	Yes	Yes	No	Yes	The Being	Also craft service, special makeup effects artist, and props
2012	Fateful Findings	Yes	Yes	Yes	Yes	Yes	No	Yes	Dylan	Also accountant, craft service, special make-up effects, location manager, production designer, sound editor, lighting design, wardrobe and set decorator
2016	Pass Thru	Yes	Yes	Yes	Yes	Yes	Yes	Yes	A.I / Thgil	Also production designer and manager, casting, set design, wardrobe, props, lighting designs, special make-up effects, locations, administration and accounting, craft services, makeup and hair and sound editor
2018	Twisted Pair	Yes	Yes	Yes	Yes	Yes	Yes	Yes	Cade Altair / Cale Altair	Also casting, make-up and hair, production manager, set designer, wardrobe, props, lighting design, special effects, stunt coordinator, aerial rigging, special makeup effects, legal accounting administration, craft services, locations, and sound editor
2020	Neil Breen 5 Feature Film Retrospective	Yes	Yes	Yes	Uncredited	Uncredited	Uncredited	Yes	Himself	Documentary about the making of his 5 first films Also uncredited sound editor and camera operator
2023	Cade: The Tortured Crossing	Yes	Yes	Yes	Yes	Yes	Yes	Yes	Cade Altair / Cale Altair	Also casting, make-up and hair, production manager, set designer, wardrobe, props, lighting design, special effects, stunt coordinator, aerial rigging, special makeup effects, legal accounting administration, craft services, locations, and sound editor
2026	Dire Duplicity	Yes	Yes	Yes	Yes	Yes	Yes	Yes	Heath	TBA

== Accolades ==
Year	Award	Category	Title	Result	Ref
2023	Hollywood Reel Independent Film Festival	People's Choice Award	Cade: The Tortured Crossing	Won	
2023	Hollywood Reel Independent Film Festival	Best Fantasy Film	Cade: The Tortured Crossing	Won	
