= Alex Saxon =

Alex Saxon may refer to:

- Alex Saxon (actor), American actor
- Bill Pronzini (born 1943), American writer of detective fiction who published several novels under pen name Alex Saxon
