= Compound Fracture (film) =

- Theatrical release poster
- Directed by: Anthony J. Rickert-Epstein
- Written by: Renae Geerlings; Tyler Mane
- Produced by: Renae Geerlings; Tyler Mane; Anthony J. Rickert-Epstein; John Saunders; Robert Ziglar
- Starring: Tyler Mane; Derek Mears; Muse Watson; Renae Geerlings; Leslie Easterbrook
- Cinematography: Anthony J. Rickert-Epstein
- Edited by: Anthony J. Rickert-Epstein; Glenn Garland
- Music by: Joel J. Richard
- Production company: Mane Entertainment
- Distributed by: Level 33 Entertainment
- Release date: May 17, 2013 (Dark Matters Film Festival)
- Running time: 90 minutes
- Country: United States
- Language: English

Compound Fracture is a 2013 American supernatural thriller. Co-written and starring Tyler Mane, the film also features veterans of the horror genre such as Derek Mears and Muse Watson.

== Plot ==
The film revolves around Michael Wolffsen (Tyler Mane), who is engaged to Juliette (Renae Geerlings), who both take care of teenager Brandon (Alex Saxon). The teenager is Michael's nephew, the son of his sister Chloe (Susan Angelo), who has died.

After a call from Michael and Chloe's father, Gary (Muse Watson), the trio arrives to the family estate to meet him and learn that he has dementia and is losing his mind. Gary's new wife, Annabelle (Leslie Easterbrook), takes care of him but has decided to leave him because he is abusive and beats her.

Things turn dark after an obscure presence arrives with them and starts chasing them. Odd accidents and curious wounds happen. Gary tries to warn them, but because of his dementia, nobody believes him. We learn that Michael had shot and killed William, his brother-in-law, and Brandon's dad, after William stabbed Chloe when she attempted to leave him and move in with Michael and Juliette.

Gary is surprised to learn that William's ghost is there because only those with Nordic marks carved on their skin for a passage ritual can stay lingering in the place the ritual has been done. Soon the group discovers that Chloe had carved the rune into her family years ago before William became abusive. Annabelle walks away from protection and is murdered by the ghost along with her niece.

A pair of cops who come to check the estate are also taken and savagely killed by William’s ghost, who is furious and seeking revenge against those who had taken his life.

A battle against William starts as they try to undo the bond done by Chloe and banish him once William breaks the spiritual defenses in the house. Gary does the only thing he thinks he can do to fight him and takes his own life, giving the opportunity for Michael to banish William. After the bitter triumph, the surviving trio leaves the estate.

== Cast ==
- Tyler Mane as Michael Wolffsen
- Muse Watson as Gary Wolffsen
- Derek Mears as William
- Renae Geerlings as Juliette
- Leslie Easterbrook as Annabelle
- Alex Saxon as Brandon
- Jelly Howie as Christine
- Susan Angelo as Chloe
- Todd Farmer as Jack
- Daniel Roebuck as Jim

== Release ==
Compound Fracture was exclusively screened in Los Angeles on September 25, 2012. Throughout 2013, Mane and Geerlings embarked on a limited release and film festival tour in major cities across the United States and Canada, starting with Mane's hometown of Saskatoon, Saskatchewan. The film opened the Dark Matters Film Festival in Albuquerque, New Mexico, and was the official selection at the Gold Coast International Film Festival.

Compound Fracture was released on DVD on May 13, 2014.

== Reception ==
HorrorSociety.com gave the film 4.5 out of 5 'skulls,' noting, "This film is the ultimate proof that you do not need to have a major studio or millions of dollars behind you to make horror gold." Fangoria called the film "a solid first outing from Mane Entertainment, utilizing an excellent cast in a layered story of madness, knotted family roots, and supernatural revenge."

Dread Central gave the film 3.5 out of 5 stars, going on to say, "These days, in a 'been there, seen that' genre world where there seems to be very few surprises left for us fans, Mane and his co-writer Geerlings deliver a fantastic little supernatural revenge tale that should keep the indie genre fans out there pleased."

The film was awarded "Best of Festival" at the 2013 Hot Springs Horror Film Festival.
