= Renae Geerlings =

American actress

- Born: November 4, 1974 (age 51); Zeeland, Michigan, U.S.
- Other name: Renae Mane
- Education: Hope College
- Occupations: Actress, singer, writer, film producer, comic book editor
- Years active: 1996–present
- Spouse: Tyler Mane (m. 2007)

Renae Geerlings (born November 4, 1974) is an American actress, singer, writer, film producer, and comics editor. She is best known for starring in the 2009 horror remake Halloween II as well as the supernatural thriller Compound Fracture, which she also co-wrote and produced.

== Early life and education ==
Geerlings was born on November 4, 1974, in Zeeland, Michigan to Paul and Jan (née Van Haitsma) Geerlings. She graduated from Zeeland High School in 1992 and then attended Hope College in the fall of the same year and graduated in 1996.

== Career ==
Geerlings became an editor for Top Cow Comics in 1996, working on various titles such as Battle of the Planets, Tomb Raider, No Honor, and Witchblade. In 2005, she appeared in a segment of America's Most Wanted followed by a role in the short film, Blame (2006). Also in 2006, she was promoted to Editor-in-Chief at Top Cow before leaving the company the following year. She currently works at Darby Pop Publishing.

In 2009, she appeared as Deputy Gwynne in Rob Zombie's remake of Halloween II (2009), also co-starring her husband Tyler Mane. Despite mixed reviews, the film was a commercial success when released on August 28, 2009. In 2010, she and her husband launched the production company, Mane Entertainment. She stars as Juliette in their first feature, the supernatural thriller Compound Fracture, released in 2013. She will next be seen as Precious in their follow-up film, Penance Lane.

== Personal life ==
Geerlings married actor and former wrestler Tyler Mane on September 3, 2007. She is the step-mother to his two children from his previous marriage.

== Filmography ==
Film
Year	Title	Role	Notes
2004	Countdown to Wednesday	Herself	Documentary
2006	Blame	Megan	Short film
2007	Ivan		Short film
2009	Halloween II	Deputy Gwynne	
2014	Compound Fracture	Juliette	Writer; Producer
2014	Heavenly Sword	Whiptail / Old Woman	Voice
2015	Howl of a Good Time	Amanda	Short
2016	COMIX: Beyond the Comic Book Pages	Herself	Documentary
2017	Charlotte	Amanda	Segment: "Howl of a Good Time"
2017	House of the Lonesome Human Beings	Everine	Short film
2018	Abnormal Attraction	Bella	Co-producer
2020	Penance Lane	Precious	Producer

Television
Year	Title	Role	Notes
2005	America's Most Wanted: America Fights Back	Ann Durrant	Season 18 episode 22
2016	DR1 Invitational	—N/a	Producer
2016	Airhogs X-Stream TV Commercial	—N/a	Line producer
2020	Your Worst Nightmare	Det. Pattie Munley	Season 6 episode 4: "He's Back"
TBA	Right in the Left Lane	Camilla	Mini-series; Post-production
