= You Gotta Believe (film) =

- Film poster
- Directed by: Ty Roberts
- Written by: Lane Garrison; Ty Roberts
- Produced by: Byron Campbell; Matt Harvey; Houston Hill; Pasha Patriki
- Starring: Luke Wilson; Greg Kinnear; Sarah Gadon; Michael Cash; Etienne Kellici; Molly Parker
- Cinematography: Stuart James Cameron
- Edited by: James K. Crouch
- Production companies: Media Finance Capital; Santa Rita Film Co.
- Distributed by: Well Go USA Entertainment
- Release date: August 30, 2024
- Running time: 100 minutes
- Country: United States
- Language: English
- Box office: $1.4 million

You Gotta Believe is a 2024 American family sports film directed by Ty Roberts and starring Luke Wilson and Greg Kinnear about the Fort Worth, Texas team that played in the 2002 Little League World Series.

== Plot ==
Bobby Ratliff and his best friend, lawyer Jon Kelly, co-coach a Little League Baseball team in Fort Worth, Texas, which their sons play on. The team is struggling and most of the players have little interest in the sport, wanting to get the season over with.

While helping his son Robert practice, Bobby suddenly collapses. He is diagnosed with stage 3 melanoma, preventing him from coaching the team. Further compounding matters, they are invited to play in the 2002 Little League World Series. Jon takes over the team, feeling it would be the biggest opportunity of their lives so far for the boys, and invites local coach Mitch Belew to help train them.

The team's performance improves and they win their qualifying games to advance to the LLWS in South Williamsport, Pennsylvania. Bobby is unable to attend as he undergoes chemotherapy.

Fort Worth wins their first game, but is blown out in the second. Tensions increase after two players collide with each other as they go to catch a fly ball. Jon threatens to send the boys home but is convinced otherwise, especially with Bobby able to make it to the next game.

Jon's son Walker pitches a no-hitter for much of the game, which remains scoreless as it enters extra innings. As the game continues, however, Fort Worth grows increasingly fatigued and unable to keep up until Walker allows a home run. He is pulled shortly after due to Little League rules prohibiting pitchers from pitching for more than nine innings. Down by two runs, Fort Worth tries to mount a comeback but Robert is ruled out at home plate while trying to score the tying run, eliminating them from the LLWS.

Bobby eventually succumbs to his cancer, dying with his family accompanying him. Jon delivers the eulogy at Bobby's funeral, while the Fort Worth team serves as the pallbearers.

In 2023, an adult Robert and his son Wyatt return to the ballpark. Robert reads a letter to Wyatt that Bobby had given him when he was younger.

== Cast ==
- Luke Wilson as Bobby Ratliff
- Greg Kinnear as Coach Jon Kelly
- Sarah Gadon as Patti Ratliff
- Michael Cash as Young Robert
- Etienne Kellici as Walker Kelly
- Molly Parker as Kathy Kelly
- Patrick Renna as Kliff Young

== Production ==
In June 2023, it was announced that Wilson, Kinnear, Gadon, Cash, Kellici and Parker were cast in the film, which was then in production. The film was shot in Oakville and London, Ontario in June 2023. Filming occurred in Cornwall (OLL) and Labatt Parks. The Oakville Little League offered its park for filming, for which it received monetary payment and new baseball equipment.

The film's title is a reference to a quote by New York Mets player Tug McGraw, said in an effort to rally the last-place Mets into winning their division during the 1973 Major League Baseball season.

== Release ==
You Gotta Believe was released in the United States on August 30, 2024. It premiered in Fort Worth, Texas at AMC Palace 9 on August 29. It made $677,094 in its opening weekend.

== Reception ==
On the review aggregator website Rotten Tomatoes, 59% of 41 critics' reviews are positive, with an average rating of 5.9/10. Metacritic, which uses a weighted average, assigned the film a score of 42 out of 100, based on 6 critics, indicating "mixed or average" reviews.
