= 2002 Little League World Series =

Children's baseball tournament

Tournament details
- Dates: August 16–August 25
- Teams: 16

Final positions
- Champions: Valley Sports American Little League (United States) Louisville, Kentucky
- Runners-up: Sendai Higashi Little League; Sendai, Miyagi, Japan

The 2002 Little League World Series took place between August 16 and August 25 in South Williamsport, Pennsylvania. The Valley Sports American Little League of Pleasure Ridge Park, a suburb of Louisville, Kentucky, defeated Sendai Higashi Little League of Sendai, Japan, in the championship game of the 56th Little League World Series (LLWS).

Notable players included 2011 NASCAR Camping World Truck Series and 2013 NASCAR Nationwide Series champion Austin Dillon, a member of the Clemmons, North Carolina, Little League representing the Southeast region. Current hitting coach for the Colorado Rockies AA affiliate, Hartford Yard Goats, Zach Osborne was the tournament MVP for the U.S. and World Champion Valley Sports American Little League.

At the beginning of the 2002 tournament the Little League organization retired uniform number 11 for all teams playing in the LLWS from that year forward in honour of Fire Department of New York firefighter Michael Cammarata, a victim of the September 11, 2001 attacks, who had worn that number during the 1991 LLWS.

== Qualification ==
Between five and twelve teams take part in 16 regional qualification tournaments, which vary in format depending on region. In the United States, the qualification tournaments are in the same format as the Little League World Series itself: a round-robin tournament followed by an elimination round to determine the regional champion.

Pool A	Pool B	Pool C	Pool D
(Texas) Fort Worth, Texas; Southwest; Westside Little League	(New York (state)) Manhattan, New York; Mid-Atlantic; Harlem Little League	(Venezuela) Valencia, Venezuela; Latin America; Los Leones Little League	(Japan) Sendai, Miyagi, Japan; Asia; Sendai Hagashi Little League
(Massachusetts) Worcester, Massachusetts; New England; Jesse Burkett Little League	(Kentucky) Louisville, Kentucky; Great Lakes; Valley Sports American Little League	(Canada) (Saskatchewan) Regina, Saskatchewan; Canada; North Regina Little League	(Curaçao) (Netherlands Antilles) Willemstad, Curaçao; Caribbean; Pariba Little League
(Missouri) Webb City, Missouri; Midwest; Webb City Little League	(California) Aptos, California; West; Aptos Little League	(Guam) Hagåtña, Guam; Pacific; Central Little League	(Mexico) Monterrey, Nuevo León, Mexico; Mexico; Country de Monterrey Little League
(Hawaii) Waipio, Hawaii; Northwest; Waipio Little League	(North Carolina) Clemmons, North Carolina; Southeast; Southwest Forsyth Little League	(Saudi Arabia) Dhahran, Saudi Arabia; Transatlantic; Arabian-American Little League	(Russia) Moscow, Russia; Europe, Middle East and Africa (EMEA); Khovrino Little League

- Guam is an organized, unincorporated territory of the United States.

== Pool play ==
The top two teams in each pool move on to their respective semifinals. The winners of each met on August 25 to play for the Little League world championship.

Pool A
Region	Record
Southwest	2–1
New England	2–1
Northwest	2–1
Midwest	0–3

Pool B
Region	Record
Great Lakes	3–0
Mid-Atlantic	2–1
West	1–2
Southeast	0–3

August 16

New England	2–3	Northwest
Midwest	0–1	Southwest

August 17

West	1–4	Great Lakes
Mid-Atlantic	9–3	Southeast
New England	2–1	Midwest

August 18

Southeast	8–11	West
West	10–4	Southeast
Northwest	0–8	Southwest
Great Lakes	2–0	Mid-Atlantic

August 19

New England	6–0	Southwest
Midwest	1–2	Northwest

August 20

West	2–5	Mid-Atlantic
Southeast	2–4	Great Lakes

=== International ===
Pool C
Region	Record
Latin America	2–1
Pacific	2–1
Transatlantic	2–1
Canada	0–3

Pool D
Region	Record
Asia	3–0
Caribbean	2–1
Mexico	1–2
EMEA	0–3

August 16

Transatlantic	3–2	Canada

August 17

Pacific	1–11	Latin America
Mexico	1–10	Caribbean
EMEA	0–7	Asia

August 18

Transatlantic	6–9	Pacific
Mexico	4–3	EMEA

August 19

EMEA	0–13^{†} (4 innings)	Caribbean
Asia	11–0^{†} (4 innings)	Mexico
Canada	3–9	Latin America

August 20

Asia	5–0	Caribbean
Canada	7–12	Pacific
Transatlantic	6–5	Latin America

=== Elimination rounds ===
Quarter-finals
August 21 - Lamade (Game ended by mercy rule)
Sendai, Japan	10
Hagåtña, Guam	0
August 22 - Lamade
Valencia, Venezuela	0
(Netherlands Antilles) Willemstad, Curaçao	3
August 21 - Lamade (11 innings)
Louisville, Kentucky	2
Fort Worth, Texas	1
August 22 - Lamade
Worcester, Massachusetts	5
(New York (state)) New York, New York	2

Semi-finals
August 24 - Lamade
Sendai, Japan	4
(Netherlands Antilles) Willemstad, Curaçao	1
August 24 - Lamade
Louisville, Kentucky	4
Worcester, Massachusetts	0

Final
August 25 - Lamade
Sendai, Japan	0
(United States) Louisville, Kentucky	1
Third place
August 25 - Volunteer
(United States) Worcester, Massachusetts	1
(Netherlands Antilles) Willemstad, Curaçao	9

2002 Little League World Series Champions
Valley Sports American Little League
Louisville, Kentucky

=== Notes ===
- † Game ended by "mercy rule" (at least a 10-run difference through 5 innings)

== Champions path ==
The Louisville Valley Sports American LL went undefeated on their road to the LLWS, winning all eleven of their matches. In total record was 17–0.

Round	Opposition	Result
Kentucky State Tournament
Group Stage	(Kentucky) Clay County LL	7–1
Group Stage	(Kentucky) Morehead LL	1–0
Group Stage	(Kentucky) Owensboro Southern LL	6–4 (F/14)
Semifinals	(Kentucky) Richmond LL	11–0 (F/4)
Championship	(Kentucky) Owensboro Southern LL	3–0
Great Lakes Regional
Group Stage	(Ohio) Hamilton West Side American LL	5–0
Group Stage	(Illinois) Bradley-Bourbonnais LL	2–1
Group Stage	(Wisconsin) Merrill LL	4–1
Group Stage	(Michigan) Grosse Pointe Farms-City LL	3–1
Semifinals	(Ohio) Hamilton West Side American LL	2–1
Great Lakes Region Championship	(Indiana) Brownsburg LL	8–1

== In popular culture ==
The U.S. semifinal between Valley Sports American Little League (Louisville, Kentucky) and Westside Little League (Fort Worth, Texas) lasted 11 innings, making it one of the longest games in Little League World Series history. The dramatic finish included back-to-back home runs in the top of the 11th inning, with Zach Osborne breaking the tie and teammate Aaron Alvey following with another blast. Osborne was later named MVP, while Alvey also set the tournament's strikeout record. Pitcher Josh Robinson took the mound in the bottom of the inning and recorded the final three outs to secure the victory for Valley Sports.

In 2024, the game and the Fort Worth team's emotional journey were dramatized in the feature film You Gotta Believe, starring Luke Wilson and Greg Kinnear. The film highlights the team's run in honor of a teammate's father who was terminally ill and portrays the semifinal as a pivotal moment in their path to Williamsport.

== Notable performances ==
Several players from the 2002 tournament turned in performances that remain among the most memorable in Little League World Series history:

- Valley Sports pitcher Aaron Alvey recorded 44 strikeouts during the 2002 Series — the most by any player in a single Little League World Series to date. In the U.S. semifinal, he struck out 19 batters across nine no-hit innings before leaving under pitch-count rules.
- Westside starter Walker Kelly matched Alvey's dominance in the same game, pitching nine innings of no-hit baseball with 21 strikeouts, one of the highest single-game totals in Series history.
- Valley Sports shortstop/pitcher Zach Osborne was named the tournament's Most Valuable Player. In addition to hitting the decisive 11th-inning home run in the U.S. semifinal, he posted a 0.00 ERA over 13 innings pitched during the Series, as noted in the official record book.
