= Lauren Powers =

American bodybuilder, actress and author

Lauren M. Powers
- Professional bodybuilder
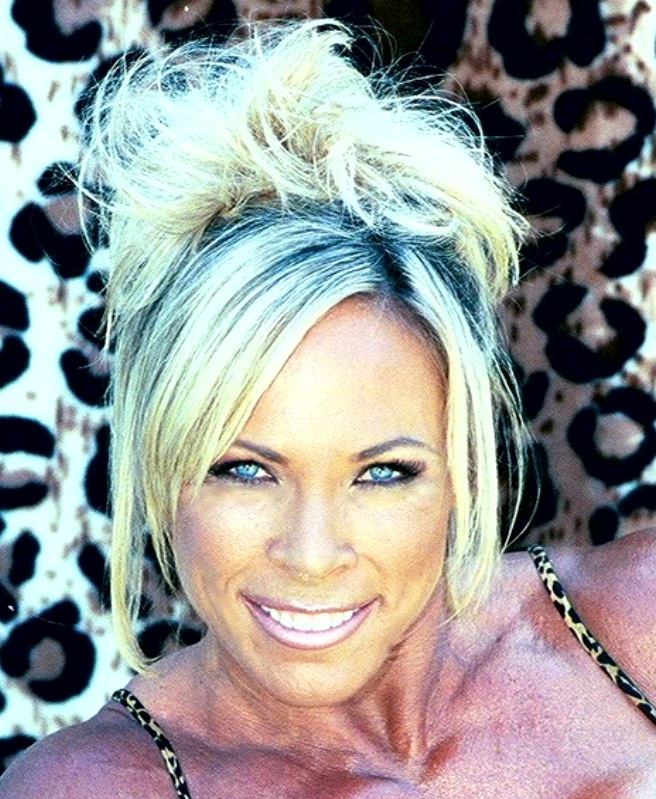

Personal info
- Born: Los Angeles, California

Best statistics
- Height: 5 ft 8 in (1.73 m)
- Weight: 160.000

Professional (Pro) career
- Best win: NPC Jan Tana Classic - 1st Heavyweight * 10 Time Overall Champion; 2014

Lauren Powers, real name Laurie Mac Donald (born December 13, 1957), is an American actress, model, TV and podcast host, and author who is the owner of Powers Fitness event. She started "Lauren Powers", a bodybuilding and fitness competition, in Orange County, California. Powers competed in amateur bodybuilding contests from 2001 until 2014. She graduated Valedictorian from Huntington Beach High School. She owned and operated a surfing academy on Maui while in college. Powers graduated from the University of Hawaiʻi with a business degree. She worked as a firefighter and engineer until a discrimination lawsuit and then she launched her fitness career.

== Works ==
=== Contest history ===
- 2001 NPC Iron Maiden 4th Heavyweight - 2nd Novice
- 2002 Orange County Muscle Classic XXV - 1st Heavyweight, 2nd Masters
- 2002 NPC California State Championships - 1st Novice (HW & Overall)
- 2002 Muscle Beach Venice Classic - 1st Masters, 1st Heavyweight & Overall
- 2002 NPC Jan Tana Classic - 1st Heavyweight Women's Open; Overall Champion Women's Open
- 2003 Emerald Cup - 3rd (HW)
- 2003 Orange County Classics HW 1st place
- 2003 California State Championships - 1st (Master Overall Champion), 4th (HW open)
- 2004 Muscle Beach Classic 1st Place Masters, 1st Place Heavyweight and Overall Women's Open
- 2010 Muscle Beach Classic 1st Place Masters, 1st Place Heavyweight and Overall Women's Open
- 2011 Muscle Beach Classic 1st Place Masters, 1st Place Heavyweight and Overall Women's Open
- 2012 Muscle Beach Classic Memorial Day 1st Place Masters, 1st Place Heavyweight and Overall Women's Open
- 2012 Muscle Beach Classic Labor Day 1st Place Masters, 1st Place Heavyweight and Overall Women's Open
- 2013 OC FIT EXPO 1st Place and OVERALL Women's Champion
- 2014 OC FIT EXPO 1st Place and OVERALL Women's Champion

=== Filmography ===
- "The Interview, Seth Rogen (2014)
- The Interplanetary Surplus Male and Amazon Women of Outer Space (2003)
- The Hollywood Mom's Mystery (2004)
- Close Encounters of the 4th Kind: Infestation from Mars (2004)
- No Pain, No Gain (2005)
- Telephone (song) (2010) Lady GAGA
- Bigger, Better, Stronger"
- Jennifer Lopez "Medicine" Music Video 2019
- Justin Bieber "Yummy" Music Video 2020
- Star-Crossed: The Film (Kacey Musgraves) (2021)
- V/H/S/99 (segment: "Ozzy's Dungeon") (2022)

=== Television appearances ===
- Twisted Sisters (2010 MSNBC documentary)
- Wilfred (TV series)
- Botched (TV series) (2015, Episode: The Bacon Bra)
- Botched (TV series) (2016, Episode: Double trouble and a breast bubble, Episode: S05E06)
- 2nd iHeartRadio Music Awards Nick Jonas "Chains" (performance)
- 2007 "Muscle Worship" documentary on the Hidden Lives series on Channel Five.
- Secret Lives of Women.
- My Strange Addiction
- 1000 Ways to Die
- Rhett and Link's Buddy System (2018)
