= Chilling Visions: 5 Senses of Fear =

- Directed by: Eric England, Nick Everhart, Emily Hagins, Jesse Holland, Miko Hughes, Andy Mitton
- Written by: Eric England, Nick Everhart, Emily Hagins, Jesse Holland, Miko Hughes, Andy Mitton, Jack Daniel Stanley
- Cinematography: Bernard Evans (segment "Listen, My Children"), Claudio Rietti, Mike Testin (segment "Taste")
- Edited by: Bryan Capri, Nick Everhart, Jesse Holland, Andy Mitton
- Music by: Matthew Llewellyn
- Production companies: Chiller Films, Synthetic Cinema International
- Release date: May 31, 2013 (Chiller network)
- Country: United States
- Language: English

Chilling Visions: 5 Senses of Fear is a 2013 horror anthology film that was directed by Eric England (Taste), Nick Everhart (Smell), Emily Hagins (Touch), Miko Hughes (See), Jesse Holland and Andy Mitton (Listen). The anthology was originally broadcast on the Chiller network on May 31, 2013 and was released onto DVD and Blu-ray on October 22 of the same year.

== Synopsis ==
The film was composed of five short films and did not have a wraparound story, instead linking the shorts together with the mysterious company Watershed, a company with sinister intentions.

=== Smell ===
Smell (directed by Nick Everhart) follows a depressed man by the name of Seth (Corey Scott Rutledge). He's in a job he doesn't like and his despondence over his recent breakup has caused him to neglect himself. When a mysterious door to door saleslady offers him a cologne that can change everything for him, Seth takes her up on the offer. Her only warning is that he shouldn't use too much of it. Excited when the cologne starts making him more successful at work and love, Seth is soon horrified when the cologne's side effects start to work on him.

=== See ===
See (directed by Miko Hughes) follows Dr. Tom (Ted Yudain), an optometrist that is able to see through the eyes of his patients. This is initially fun for him until he discovers that one of his patients is experiencing domestic abuse at the hand of her boyfriend (Lowell Byers). Tom tries to intervene by using his ability to cause the boyfriend to experience hellish visions, but this soon backfires.

=== Touch ===
Touch (directed by Emily Hagins) follows a young blind boy that must go search for help after his parents are wounded in a car accident. In his desperation he comes across a killer who has an aversion to being touched (Lowell Byers), and who is living in a set of abandoned buildings.

=== Taste ===
Taste (directed by Eric England) is centered upon Aaron (Doug Roland), a hacker that finds himself in a large corporate building at the bequest of Watershed businesswoman Lacey (Symba Smith), who wants to interview him. He's offered a lucrative job, but refuses and is instead treated to a deadly encounter.

=== Listen ===
Listen (directed by Jesse Holland and Andy Mitton) is a found footage short that follows two men making a movie about Listen, My Children, a song that has the ability to kill. They manage to find footage of a doctor conducting experiments with the song and ultimately end up playing the song for others.

== Reception ==
Critical reception for the film has been mixed. Twitch Film commented that like many other anthologies, some of the shorts were "duds" but that overall the shorts were "fairly consistent". Reviews from Bloody Disgusting were divided, with one reviewer criticizing the film as being "more predictable than terrifying" while the other reviewer stated that it was a "mixed bag, but a completely watchable one straight through." Shock Till You Drop panned the first three shorts (Smell, See, and Touch) as they felt that viewers could "definitely skip the first three and not miss anything" while praising the final two (Taste and Listen).
