= No Pain, No Gain (2005 film) =

- Directed by: Samuel Turcotte
- Written by: Samuel Turcotte; Jodi Lane Baum
- Produced by: Samuel Turcotte; Raul V. Carrera
- Starring: Gus Malliarodakis; Joe Hursley; Julie Strain; Harry Knowles; Lauren Powers; Toni Ferrai
- Cinematography: Mike King
- Edited by: Scott Arundale; Christopher Roldan
- Music by: Terry Wollman
- Release date: December 3, 2005
- Country: United States
- Language: English

No Pain, No Gain is a 2005 American comedy-drama film starring Gus Malliarodakis, Joe Hursley, Julie Strain, Harry Knowles, Lauren Powers, Toni Ferrai, co-written by Samuel Turcotte and Jodi Lane Baum and directed by Samuel Turcotte.

== Plot ==
The story of a bodybuilder who longs to be respected for his mind. Mike Zorillo, a small town Ohio champion bodybuilder with a genius IQ, journeys to the Mecca of bodybuilding, Los Angeles, determined to beat his nemesis, Jake Steel, with natural science instead of steroids. Far from home, he's confronted by a gym culture of freaks, juicers and Hollywood wannabes. As he pursues his dream, he's also persecuted by the world's largest sports nutrition company, an entity that's hell-bent on destroying him. Against all odds, the honest and driven bodybuilder resolves to win the prestigious "Mr. West Coast" competition as a way to prove himself and his ideas to the world.
