= Zombie Girl: The Movie =

- Promotional poster
- Directed by: Justin Johnson; Aaron Marshall; Erik Mauck
- Produced by: Justin Johnson; Aaron Marshall; Erik Mauck
- Starring: Emily Hagins; Meghan Hagins; Harry Jay Knowles; Jerry Hagins
- Cinematography: Justin Johnson; Erik Mauck
- Edited by: Aaron Marshall
- Music by: Christopher Thomas
- Production company: Bob B. Bob Productions Part Olson Pictures Vacdoomed Productions
- Distributed by: R Squared Films
- Release date: January 16, 2009
- Running time: 89 minutes
- Country: United States
- Language: English

Zombie Girl: The Movie is a 2009 documentary directed by Justin Johnson, Aaron Marshall, and Erik Mauck. The film focuses on the making of the 2006 zombie film Pathogen that was directed by Emily Hagins, who was twelve years old at the time.

== Plot ==
The documentary chronicles the making of Emily Hagin's feature-length zombie film Pathogen. The film, which took Hagin two years to complete and screen, was met with several setbacks during its filming due to elements such as theft of property. During the filming of Zombie Girl, the directors noted Hagin's growth as a fledgling director, as she was twelve at the time Pathogen was made.

== Cast ==
- Emily Hagins
- Megan Hagins
- Jerry Hagins
- C. Robert Cargill
- Tiger Darrow
- Kate Dawson
- Rebecca Elliott
- Alec Herskowitz
- Kirk Hunter
- Rose Kent-McGlew
- Harry Jay Knowles
- Tim League
- Phillip Thomas Martinez
- Jay Giovanni Ramirez
- Neil Reece

== Reception ==
Critical reception for Zombie Girl: The Movie has been mostly positive. On Rotten Tomatoes the film holds a rating of 100% based reviews from 9 critics. IndieWire gave a positive review, saying that while they had their doubts about the documentary's running time, "the directors manage to craft an intermittently entertaining chronicle of Hagins's attempts to navigate the usual filmmaking hurdles — in addition to a few unique ones." The documentary also received positive reviews from Fearnet and Film Threat.

=== Awards ===
- Spirit of Slamdance Award from the Slamdance Film Festival (2009)
