= Emily Hagins =

American filmmaker

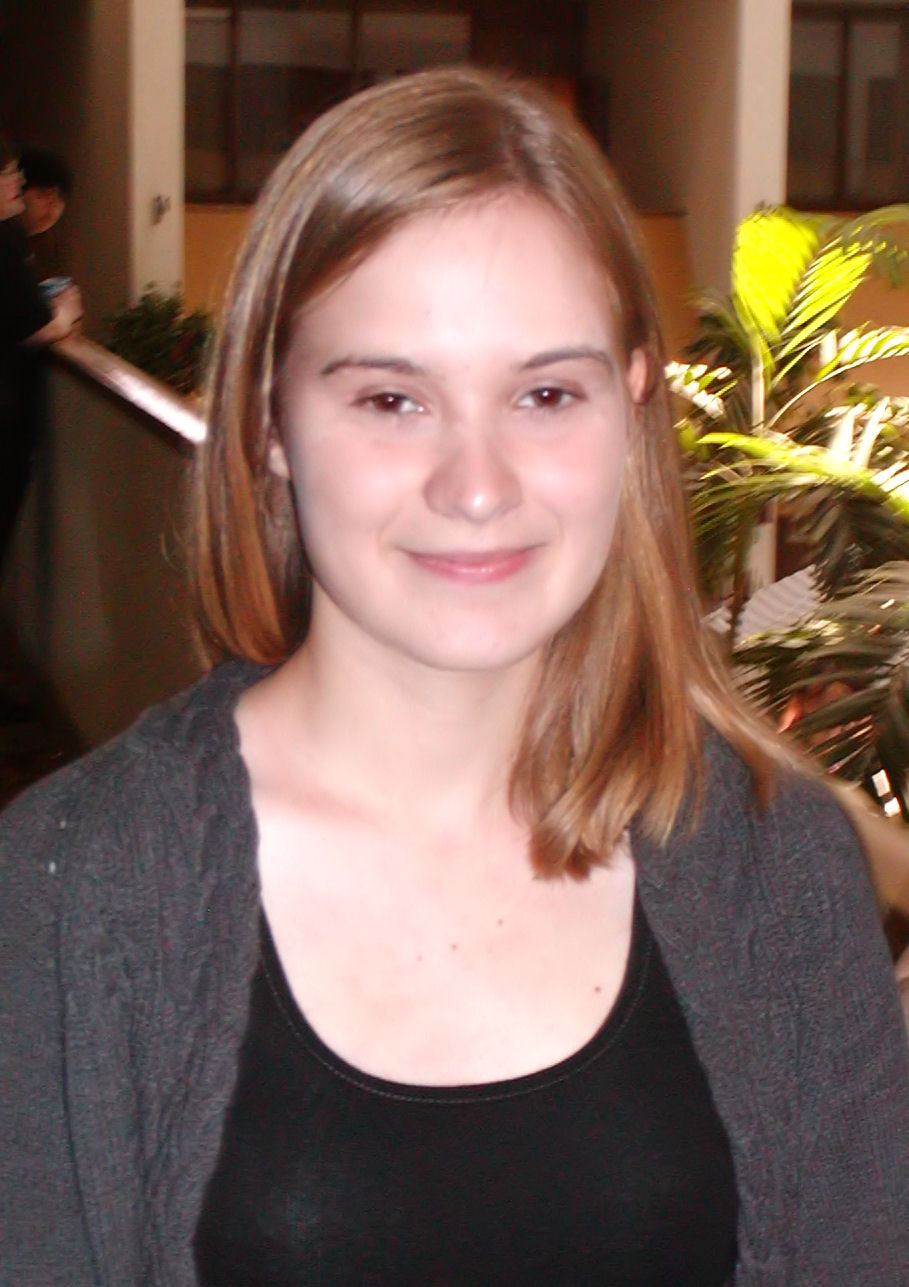
- Emily Hagins, 2008
- Born: October 27, 1992 (age 33); Philadelphia, Pennsylvania, U.S.
- Years active: 2002–present

Emily Hagins (born October 27, 1992) is a Los Angeles-based filmmaker.

== Biography ==
Emily Hagins made her first feature at the age of 12 in her hometown of Austin, Texas – a zombie movie called Pathogen. The documentary Zombie Girl: The Movie chronicled her process from start to finish. Hagins made her second feature, The Retelling, at the age of 14. At 17, she wrote and directed her third feature, My Sucky Teen Romance, which film premiered at SXSW and was distributed by Dark Sky Films.

Her fourth feature, Grow Up, Tony Phillips, also premiered at SXSW and was released on DVD/VOD in 2014. She also wrote and directed the segment "Touch" for Chiller's horror anthology Chilling Visions: 5 Senses of Fear. Her next feature film, a teen heist movie titled Coin Heist, was based on a young adult novel of the same name and was released as a Netflix Original Film in January 2017. She also completed the six-part digital series Hold to Your Best Self with Adaptive Studios, which premiered at SXSW 2018. She returned to feature-filmmaking with Sorry About the Demon in 2022.

== Filmography ==
- Pathogen (2006)
- The Retelling (2009)
- My Sucky Teen Romance (2011)
- Chilling Visions: 5 Senses of Fear (2013, "Touch" segment)
- Grow Up, Tony Phillips (2013)
- Coin Heist (2017)
- Hold To Your Best Self (2018, digital series)
- V/H/S: Video Horror Shorts (2018, miniseries, episode "First Kiss")
- Scare Package (2019, "Cold Open" segment)
- Sorry About the Demon (2023)
