= Sorry About the Demon =

- Film poster
- Directed by: Emily Hagins
- Written by: Emily Hagins
- Produced by: Aaron B. Koontz; Ashleigh Snead; Ben Hanks; Cameron Burns; Emily Gotto; Pasha Patriki
- Production companies: Paper Street Pictures; Hangar 18 Media; Blood Oath
- Distributed by: Shudder
- Release dates: August 2022 (FrightFest); January 19, 2023 (Shudder)
- Running time: 105 minutes

Sorry About the Demon is a 2022 American horror comedy film written and directed by Emily Hagins. It stars Jon Michael Simpson, Olivia Ducayen, Paige Evans, Jeff McQuitty and Presley Allard.

== Plot ==
A broken-hearted young man learns about his new place being full of restless spirits.

== Cast ==
- Jon Michael Simpson as Will
- Paige Evans as Amy
- Jeff McQuitty as Patrick
- Olivia Ducayen as Aimee
- Presley Allard as Grace Sellers

== Production ==
In August 2021, Deadline reported that Shudder and Paper Street Pictures had partnered with Hagins on the film, which wrapped production around that time, with Shudder set to release the film in 2022. Shudder, Paper Street and Hagins previously worked together on the 2020 horror comedy film Scare Package, for which Hagins directed the "Cold Open" segment.

== Release ==
The film premiered at FrightFest 2022. It was released on Shudder on January 19, 2023.

== Reception ==
On the review aggregator website Rotten Tomatoes, 91% of 11 critics' reviews are positive, with an average rating of 6.7/10.

Noel Murray of the Los Angeles Times said the film was "too slackly paced and there's a broad tone to the jokes and performances that skews corny. But the central comic premise is a hoot; and the movie has an unexpectedly philosophical dimension." Tyler Doupe of Dread Central gave the film a score of 3/5, saying, "This horror comedy drags in the middle and skimps on scares. But the humor and a likable lead make it worth a look."
