= Twisted Pair (film) =

2018 American science fiction film directed by Neil Breen

- Theatrical release poster
- Directed by: Neil Breen
- Written by: Neil Breen
- Produced by: Neil Breen
- Starring: Neil Breen; Sara Meritt; Siohbun Ebrahimi; Denise Bellini; Marty Dasis; Brad Stein; John Smith Burns; Art MacHenster; Greg Smith Burns; Ada Masters; Jason Moriglio
- Cinematography: Neil Breen
- Edited by: John Mastrogiacomo; Neil Breen
- Music by: Neil Breen
- Production companies: Neil Breen Films, LLC
- Distributed by: Neil Breen Films, LLC
- Release dates: October 3, 2018 (North Hollywood); February 9, 2019 (United Kingdom)
- Running time: 89 minutes
- Country: United States
- Language: English
- Budget: $7,073

Twisted Pair is a 2018 American independent science fiction psychological thriller film directed, produced, scored, edited, and written by Neil Breen. The film stars Breen, Sara Meritt, Siohbun Ebrahimi, Denise Bellini, Marty Dasis, Brad Stein, John Smith Burns, Art MacHenster, Greg Smith Burns, Ada Masters, and Jason Moriglio. The film centers around identical twin brothers, Cade and Cale Altair, who become hybrid artificial intelligence entities and are torn in different directions to achieve justice for humanity.

Twisted Pair had its world premiere on October 3, 2018, at the Laemmle Theatre in North Hollywood, Los Angeles, California, by Neil Breen Films, LLC. Like Breen's previous outings, it was largely panned by critics and audiences, but has since developed a cult following. A sequel, Cade: The Tortured Crossing, had its world premiere on February 25, 2023, at the Regal Cinemas L.A. Live.

== Plot ==
During their youth, Cade and his identical twin brother Cale were abducted by aliens and modified to become humanoids, secret agents hired to stop evil. After some time, Cale did not fit in with the program and was fired. Cade, as an adult, is introduced on a mission where he is protecting troops. He returns to headquarters and meets with his boss, who suggests that he take a vacation. Cade laments not having seen his brother in awhile.

Cale interrogates a lawyer, an executive, and the president of the bank, before he shoots one of them in the leg, and leaves to do pills with his girlfriend Donna. Cade's boss tells him about programmable virtual reality and how a man named Cuzzx is going to use it to conduct the biggest cyber and terror attack ever. Cade decides to investigate, but while investigating, he bumps into Alana. He offers to go on a date with her to apologize, but she rejects his offer and leaves. Later, he sees her and decides to follow her home. Cade breaks into her house and they fight, before they abruptly stop fighting, revealing that they'd been in a relationship the whole time.

Cade breaks into a Cuzzx lab to find clues for his mission. Cade finds four men wearing VR goggles who are in some kind of trance, and in the next room, a very old person dressed like Cuzzx meeting with people. The men disappear, due to the programmable virtual reality and Cade reports back to his boss. Cade takes Alana, his girlfriend, out to dinner, and a mysterious man stabs Cade's homeless friend, taking his cell phone. Meanwhile, Cale tracks down and murders a rich executive, but accidentally drops a syringe at the crime scene. Cade pretends to be a rich investor who wants to give money to the Cuzzx Empire, which gets him a tour of Cuzzx's house. Donna, Cale's pillhead girlfriend, breaks up with him and then runs into Cade, demanding to know where she can get more drugs and why he shaved his beard. Cade responds by saying "I never had a beard" repeatedly. He gives Donna some money to find a place to stay and they hug. Alana sees and gets jealous. The aforementioned mysterious man enters the home of a prostitute before the film cuts to Cade outside the Cuzzx empire building.

Cade then decides to take down the Cuzzx empire and goes into the boiler room to enact his plan. After his empire is destroyed, Cuzzx flees the country. Cade goes home and Alana pulls a gun on him, as she was working for Cuzzx the whole time. They shoot each other, and Alana dies in his arms. In the virtual reality forest, Cade and Alana reunite, they embrace and Alana tells him she loves him, and then disappears. The film ends with Cade addressing the audience, accepting the loss of Alana, and stating that humanity will eventually live in a virtual universe. Before the credits, the message "Cade Altair will return" appears onscreen.

== Cast ==
- Neil Breen as Cade Altair / Cale Altair, identical twin brothers who become artificial intelligence entities
- Siohbun Ebrahimi as Donna, Cale's pillhead girlfriend
- Sara Meritt as Alana, Cade's girlfriend
- Denise Bellini as Agency Director
- Marty Dasis as Corp. Executive/Detective/Soldier
- Brad Stein as Detective; his role is misspelled as "Dectective" in the credits.
- John Smith Burns as Corp. Executive
- Art MacHenster as Corp. Executive/Soldier
- Greg Smith Burns as Cuzzx, a business magnate who plans to use programmable virtual reality to conduct the biggest cyber and terror attack ever.
- Ada Masters as Winged Muse
- Jason Moriglio as Homeless Man/Agency Executive

== Production ==
In March 2017, funding for the film, originally titled Twisted, was achieved via a GoFundMe campaign, which raised $7,073. Principal photography began on September 2, 2017, at Nevada State College and starring Neil Breen, Sara Meritt, Siohbun Ebrahimi, Denise Bellini, Marty Dasis, Brad Stein, John Smith Burns, Art MacHenster, Greg Smith Burns, Ada Masters, and Jason Moriglio. In April 2018, during post-production on Twisted Pair, Breen released a trailer for the film.

== Release ==
Twisted Pair had its world premiere on October 3, 2018, at the Laemmle Theatre in North Hollywood, Los Angeles, California, prior to being theatrically released in the United Kingdom on February 9, 2019, by Neil Breen Films, LLC.

== Reception ==
/Film gave a review of the trailer with "Breen shows up playing a pair of identical twins standing in front of what looks like a screensaver. Things just get better/weirder from there, and we're treated to one of the worst (best?) fake beards in history. Watching this trailer, you start to think that maybe this is a very elaborate joke, and Breen is just messing with us. But I assure you, Breen is serious, and that makes it even better."

Twisted Pair has received negative reviews by several critics. Leor Galil of the Chicago Reader said "Twisted Pair doesn't make much sense, it drags in parts, and it sometimes resembles the ramblings of a tinfoil-hatted conspiracy theorist. But, somehow, Breen unexpectedly emerges with flecks of gold, little moments that have stubbornly attached themselves to my memory". Gena Radcliffe of The Spool also gave a negative review by stating "The deeply strange Neil Breen returns with an even more deeply strange entry in his filmography of homespun, barely-coherent psychological thrillers." She elaborated by stating "What little plot exists is incoherent... Breen himself doesn't understand what's happening in his own movie, or, at least, what kind of movie he wants it to be. He drops phrases like "artificial intelligence" and "programmable virtual reality," and they don't have any meaning or bearing on the plot. Though he describes Twisted Pair in publicity material as a "psychological thriller," it is most definitely not that. What it does have are some elements of science fiction, a murder mystery, espionage, romance, and even a touch of domestic drama, but none of it is cohesive, and none of it goes anywhere. They're all their own little mini-plots, like Short Cuts if it was made by an alien who only had a rudimentary grasp of English." She mentions a positive element of the film with "There's a seed of something interesting planted here – the villain looks like a dollar store Elvis Costello, carries a bowl of diamonds around, and talks like his voice is being disguised on an episode of Dateline NBC. Unfortunately, time that could have been spent developing this character, or at least explaining who he is and what motivates him (and why his scarf keeps changing colors), is wasted on long scenes of Breen indifferently creeping around in an empty laboratory."

Grady Bolding of Cultured Vultures gave a negative review by stating "It has its moments of hilarity which kill any boredom that might ensue, but otherwise, it's a raging fire that cannot be put out." Bolding describes the positive elements of the film with "The only strength with Neil Breen's film is quite similar to what the great Tommy Wiseau did with The Room. While The Room can be seen as an unintentional takedown of the superficiality of Hollywood drama films, Breen's film(s) provide an antithesis to the overly hyped mercenary-for-hire/vigilante agent films seen today in American theaters. American culture has always championed the idea of a lone warrior setting out to right the wrongs of society, if not the world. Twisted Pair efficiently reflects this part of American culture, but provides unintentional satire. The All-American hero is a noticeably aged Neil Breen who either makes his enemies think about their actions or makes them pay for it. He is not a stocky, barrel-chested figure like Matt Damon or Chuck Norris. He's so aged and withered that it makes him 100% average." Bolding summarizes Breen's work by stating that "any audience can – and will – laugh at Neil Breen's mediocrity, but they will easily be able to project themselves into what he's trying to accomplish. Breen fails across the board, but he gives us something worth laughing at and enjoying. In this respect, Breen accomplishes his mission when it comes to the most basic tenant [sic] of producing a film: providing entertainment."

Diego Olguín of The Charlatan also gave a negative review by stating "The surreal editing makes the film almost incomprehensible; the soundtrack is pretty much stock trailer music; the special effects look straight out of some mid 1990s straight-to-VHS movie; and the script is full of nonsensical dialogue, amplified by the cast's wooden deliveries. However, no film must reach perfection in order to be enjoyable, and this is a clear example of this." Olguín continues by discussing some of the positives of the film, "While Twisted Pair fails in every level in being an action film with social commentary, it does succeed as an unintentional comedy. While the CGI looks cheap and fake, that only adds to the fun during scenes where explosions awkwardly fill a classroom. Breen's acting capabilities rival Tommy Wiseau's in how weird and inhuman they are. Watching him trying his best to emote sadness as he tries to persuade his brother (which is Breen with a cheap beard and a hoodie) to turn himself in to the cops is something to be witnessed—preferably with a few friends and some drinks. There is also a sense of honest effort on the film, crappiness aside. You can feel that Breen tried his best to deliver a legitimately good movie, like a modern-day Ed Wood—famous only for people roasting his past films, but still not giving up."

== Sequel ==
On March 11, 2019, Breen confirmed that a sequel was in development. On October 3, 2022, Breen revealed that filming on his latest project had wrapped via his Twitter account. On December 16, 2022, Breen announced that the film is titled Cade: The Tortured Crossing and would have its world premiere in early 2023, in film festivals.
