= Pasha Patriki =

Canadian producer, cinematographer and director

- Occupations: Cinematographer, director, film producer
- Years active: 2000–present
- Notable work: Gridlocked; Black Water; V/H/S/94; Brooklyn 45; You Gotta Believe (film); Deathstalker
- Website: pashapatrikiranoveraguy.com

Pasha Patriki is a Canadian film producer, cinematographer, and film director. He was director of photography (also commonly referred to as 'Cinematographer") on the films like Please Kill Mr. Know It All, Gridlocked, The Sound, and the 2016 film Anonymous (also known as Hacker), noted for its polished and crisp visuals. Patriki is a founder of a film production & financing company, 9 Light Entertainment, which has executive-produced a number of films including Spare Parts and Broken Mile.

In January 2017, Patriki won the Best Cinematography award in the TV Drama category of the Canadian Society of Cinematographers Awards for his work on the feature film Gridlocked, starring Dominic Purcell. Also in 2017, he directed as well was the cinematographer on Black Water, an action film starring Dolph Lundgren and Jean-Claude Van Damme, released in 2018. In September 2017, Patriki's 9 Light Entertainment partnered with a Canadian film sales and distribution firm Raven Banner Entertainment to form Hangar 18 Media, a film development and production company. Since 2017, under Hangar 18 Media brand Patriki produced a number of films, notably Spare Parts (directed by Andrew Thomas Hunt), Nail In The Coffin: The Fall and Rise of Vampiro, a documentary about a wrestler called Vampiro, directed by Michael Paszt, V/H/S/94, Brooklyn 45, The Fight Machine, The Breach, and Sorry About the Demon. In 2023, Patriki produced Frankie Freako, a comedy-horror film directed by Steven Kostanski; the movie is set to be released in theaters on October 4, 2024. In the same year, Patriki directed the TV movie The Threat Next Door which premiered on Tubi, and worked as a Canadian producer on You Gotta Believe, the American sports film directed by Ty Roberts and starring Luke Wilson, Greg Kinnear, Sarah Gadon and Molly Parker. Also in 2023, Patriki, Slash, Michael Paszt, James Fler, Andrew T. Hunt and Rodrigo Gudiño launched the horror production company BerserkerGang. In 2024 BerserkerGang company announced production of Deathstalker, a reboot of 1983 Roger Corman-produced movie of the same name, written and directed by Steven Kostanski, executive produced by Slash, produced by Patriki and Paszt, and starring Daniel Bernhardt.

== Filmography ==
Year	Title	Role	Notes
2011	The Collapsed	Cinematographer	
2011	Kenneyville	Cinematographer	
2012	The Great Chameleon	Cinematographer	
2012	Please Kill Mr. Know It All	Cinematographer	
2013	Separation	Cinematographer	
2014	Somnolence	Cinematographer	
2014	The Christmas Switch	Cinematographer	
2015	Gridlocked	Cinematographer	Winner in TV Drama category of the 2017 Canadian Society of Cinematographers
2015	Bigfoot and the Burtons	Cinematographer	
2016	Hacker (also known as Anonymous)	Cinematographer	
2016	Broken Mile	Executive producer	
2017	The Sound	Cinematographer	
2018	Black Water	Director, Cinematographer, Producer	
2018	Lifechanger	Executive Producer	
2019	Isabelle	Cinematographer, Executive Producer	
2019	Spare Parts	Producer, Cinematographer	
2017	The Sound	Cinematographer	
2020	Money Plane	Cinematographer	
2020	Nail In The Coffin: The Fall And Rise of Vampiro	Producer, Cinematographer	
2021	V/H/S/94	Producer	
2022	The Fight Machine	Producer	
2022	The Breach	Producer	
2022	Sorry About the Demon	Producer	
2023	The Threat Next Door	Director	
2023	Brooklyn 45	Producer	
2024	You Gotta Believe	Producer, VFX Supervisor	
2024	Frankie Freako	Producer	
2025	Deathstalker	Producer	
2025	Lunatic: The Luna Vachon Story	Producer	
