= Cade: The Tortured Crossing =

2023 American science fiction film directed by Neil Breen

- Theatrical release poster
- Directed by: Neil Breen
- Written by: Neil Breen
- Produced by: Neil Breen
- Starring: Neil Breen; Judy Lay; Gwendolyn Brown; Eric Lum; Landon Munoz; Amy Solomon; Nicole Butler; Leslie McKinney; Jennifer Estrella; Daryl Morris; Kevon Tyree; Talus Night; Jeremy Chavez; Tommy Lawler; Derek Powell; Addyson Medley
- Cinematography: Neil Breen
- Edited by: John Mastrogiacomo; Neil Breen
- Music by: Neil Breen
- Production companies: Neil Breen Films, LLC
- Distributed by: Neil Breen Films, LLC
- Release dates: February 25, 2023 (HRIFF); August 8, 2023 (Alamo Drafthouse)
- Running time: 96 minutes
- Country: United States
- Language: English

Cade: The Tortured Crossing is a 2023 American independent science fiction psychological thriller film directed, produced, written by and starring Neil Breen. Serving as a standalone sequel to Twisted Pair (2018), the film stars Breen, Judy Lay, Gwendolyn Brown, Eric Lum, Landon Munoz, Amy Solomon, Nicole Butler, Leslie McKinney, Jennifer Estrella, Daryl Morris, Kevon Tyree, Talus Night, Jeremy Chavez, Tommy Lawler, Derek Powell, and Addyson Medley. The film centers around identical twin brothers, Cade and Cale Altair, who are hybrid artificial intelligence entities, with the former trying to solve a conspiracy surrounding a mental asylum, while the later tries to cure himself using experimental drugs.

Cade: The Tortured Crossing had its world premiere on February 25, 2023, during the Hollywood Reel Independent Film Festival at the Regal Cinemas L.A. Live, by Neil Breen Films, LLC. The film began a public theatrical rollout on July 28, 2023, in Canada, before its domestic debut on August 8, in select Alamo Drafthouse Cinema theaters. Like Breen's previous films, the film received negative reviews from critics.

== Plot ==
Cade Altair donates a large amount of money to an unnamed psychiatric hospital that has fallen into extensive disrepair. The hospital turns out to be a cover for a joint corporate-government plot to engage in human trafficking, as the young patients are kidnapped and their blood is taken for genetic experimentation. Cale also resurfaces, abducting the patients for the experiments before his brother Cade can save them. But Cade has his own plan: he intends to train the patients so they become mystical warriors. In the end, his plan succeeds in stopping the villain's plot.

== Cast ==
- Neil Breen as Cade Altair / Cale Altair, identical twin brothers who become artificial intelligence entities
- Judy Lay as Patient
- Gwendolyn Brown as Mental Patient
- Eric Lum as Tim
- Landon Munoz as Mental Patient
- Amy Solomon as Doctor
- Nicole Butler as Doctor
- Leslie McKinney as Police Chief
- Jennifer Estrella as Lady in white
- Daryl Morris
- Kevon Tyree as Patient
- Talus Night as Detective
- Jeremy Chavez as Detective
- Tommy Lawler as Co. CEO
- Derek Powell as Corp. Exec.
- Addyson Medley as Corp. Exec.

== Production ==
On March 11, 2019, Breen confirmed that a sequel to Twisted Pair was in development. On October 3, 2022, Breen revealed that filming on his latest project had wrapped via his Twitter account. On December 16, 2022, Breen announced that the film is titled Cade: The Tortured Crossing and would have its world premiere in early 2023, in film festivals. By August 2023, it was revealed that the entire film was shot using green-screens. The film stars Breen, Judy Lay, Gwendolyn Brown, Eric Lum, Landon Munoz, Amy Solomon, Nicole Butler, Leslie McKinney, Jennifer Estrella, Daryl Morris, Kevon Tyree, Talus Night, Jeremy Chavez, Tommy Lawler, Derek Powell, and Addyson Medley.

== Release ==
Cade: The Tortured Crossing had its world premiere on February 25, 2023, during the Hollywood Reel Independent Film Festival at the Regal Cinemas L.A. Live, before its international debut during the Sci-Fi-London film festival at the Prince Charles Cinema on June 1, June 4, July 15, and August 19, 2023. The film began a public theatrical rollout, starting on July 28 in Canada, before releasing in several Alamo Drafthouse Cinemas on August 8 and at the Liberty Hall Cinema in Lawrence, Kansas, on August 19.

== Reception ==
=== Critical response ===
Craig Jones, of MovieWeb, gave a negative review of the trailer, saying it is just as "shoddy as Neil Breen's previous films, with terrible green screen effects, acting that the average plank of wood would find embarrassing, and a plot of some description". Jones further elaborated that the film's "crazy fight scenes, laughably poor line readings, and strange directorial choices make for a film that, no matter how numerous its failings, doesn't promise to be dull".

Anton Bitel, of SciFiNow, gave a negative review of the film, writing "it all comes with the dissociative, dislocating feel of a drawn-out dream, or perhaps of a parable of the endless, interdimensional conflict between good and evil". Brian Kirchgessner, of MovieWeb, also gave the film a negative review, summarizing that "the film is simply bizarre; the abysmal green-screen effects and opaque plotting create a dissociative, dreamlike state that would make David Lynch proud".

Sean McGeady, of Paste Magazine, gave the film a negative review, writing "there's a scene in his latest epic in which his character is attacked by a white tiger. The sequence, which sees a sexagenarian quasi-superhero and a janky 3D tiger model engage in a 90-second Greco-Roman knuckle lock until they come to some sort of mutual understanding, is not an anomaly. It is vintage Breen". Rumsey Taylor, of The New York Times, also wrote a negative review for the film, summarizing that Neil Breen "has made five imaginative, bewildering low-budget paranormal thrillers, spurring both ridicule and awe. [In] his sixth film, his singular, if peculiar, vision has remained intact".

Gena Radcliffe, of The Spool, critiqued the film, saying that "what [Neil Breen] is trying to say isn't all that hard to figure out: he thinks the world would be better off without corrupt CEOs and pass-the-buck lawmakers (and hey, I don't disagree). The problem is how he says it, often in the most incomprehensible, startlingly inept way possible. His sixth film, Cade: The Tortured Crossing, is his most baffling yet". Tyler Hummel, of Geeks Under Grace, wrote, in a negative review, "all the hallmarks of Breen movies are here: poor acting, poor staging, awkward direction, lingering shots, and recycled footage. But it is all made worse by the fact that the film is 100% shot in front of green screens".

=== Accolades ===
Year	Award	Category	Result	Ref(s)
2023	Hollywood Reel Independent Film Festival	People's Choice Award	Won	
2023	Hollywood Reel Independent Film Festival	Best Fantasy Film	Won	
