= Coin Heist =

2017 film by Emily Hagins

- Release poster
- Directed by: Emily Hagins
- Written by: Emily Hagins
- Based on: Coin Heist by Elisa Ludwig
- Produced by: T.J. Barrack; Ash Christian; Anne Clements; Marshall Lewy; Claire Skowronek
- Starring: Sasha Pieterse; Alexis G. Zall; Alex Saxon; Jay Walker; Neal Huff; Michael Cyril Creighton; Mark Blum
- Cinematography: Noah Greenberg
- Edited by: William Paley
- Music by: Jeremy William Smith
- Production company: Adaptive Studios
- Distributed by: Netflix
- Release date: January 6, 2017
- Running time: 97 minutes
- Country: United States
- Language: English

Coin Heist is a 2017 American crime drama film written and directed by Emily Hagins, based on the young-adult novel of the same name by Elisa Ludwig. The film stars Sasha Pieterse, Alexis G. Zall, Alex Saxon, Jay Walker, and Connor Ratliff. It was released on Netflix on January 6, 2017.

In the film, a group of students try to raise money for their school by breaking into a mint and creating a limited edition run of coins to sell to collectors.

== Plot ==
At Dennington Prep school, four initially non-connected students band together to recover some of the $10 million in funds that were embezzled from the school's coffers. Alice, a skilled hacker, approaches Jason, son of the headmaster (accused of mishandling the funds) with the idea to create their own slightly altered Michigan state quarters, worth $5,000 each. She was inspired during their recent class trip to the Philadelphia Mint. They enlist mechanical help from Benny, a football scholarship student who helps in his uncle's garage, and Dakota, Jason's bossy ex-girlfriend, who is incredibly organised.

Dakota gets the team into the Mint by first sweet-talking the guards, posing as a reporter to distract the manager. Alice hacks the security system through the mint's computer, while the guys work on how to create a slightly altered die. Everything seems to be coming together when they have a big falling out. They are forced to follow through when Alice hacks the Mint's website, giving them Saturday, the night of the formal, to mint the coins. Jason and Dakota prepare to play the music, while Alice and Benny go to mint the quarters. They have a double glitch, accidentally producing 10 times the amount needed, and not actually canceling the real maintenance truck. Jason and Dakota come to their aid.

They seem to have gotten away with it, but their art teacher discovers their heist. Bringing them before the president of the school board, who was incidentally the culprit for the missing $10 million, they offer him the valuable coins in exchange for returning the money to the school's endowment and their immunity. The film ends with Dakota proposing that Benny and she try a relationship and Jason the same to Alice, but with him at a normal high school.

== Cast ==
- Sasha Pieterse as Dakota Cunningham
- Alexis G. Zall as Alice Drake
- Alex Saxon as Jason Hodges
- Jay Walker as Benny
- Michael Cyril Creighton as Mr. Rankin, Art and Designs teacher
- Zach Broussard as Toni
- Craig Walker as Nico
- Connor Ratliff as Mr. Garcia
- Slate Holmgren as Horace
- Will Denton as Dylan
- David W. Thompson as Greg
- Mark Blum as Mr. Smerconish, President of the Board
- Olivia Birkelund as Mrs. Hodges
