= Tyler Mane =

Canadian professional wrestler (born 1966)

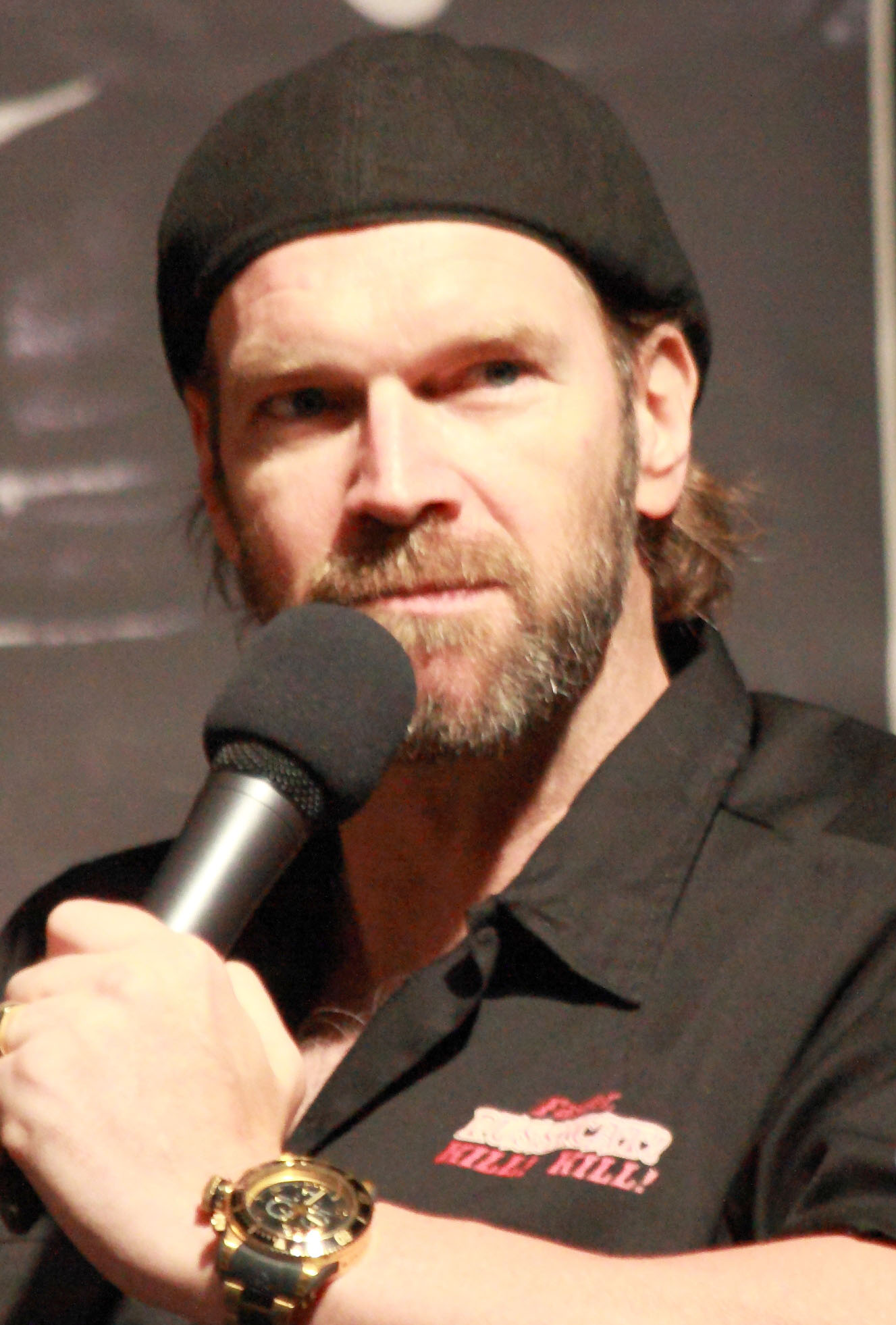
- Mane in 2014
- Born: Daryl Karolat; December 8, 1966 (age 59); Saskatoon, Saskatchewan, Canada
- Occupations: Actor; professional wrestler
- Years active: 1992–present (actor); 1986–1996 (wrestler)
- Spouses: Jean Goertz (m. 1988; div. 2003) Renae Geerlings (m. 2007)
- Children: 2
- Professional wrestling career
- Ring name(s): Big Sky; Darryl Karolet; Giant Steele; Gully Gaspar; Nitron; Sky High Lee; Sky High Walker; The Skywalker 'Sky' Walker; Skywalker Nitron; Tyler Mane
- Billed height: 6 ft 8 in (203 cm)
- Billed weight: 295 lb (134 kg)
- Trained by: Mando Guerrero; Red Bastien; Stu Hart
- Debut: 1986
- Retired: 1999

Daryl Karolat (born December 8, 1966) is a Canadian actor and retired professional wrestler, better known by the name Tyler Mane. He is known for playing supervillain Sabretooth in X-Men (2000), X-Men: The Official Game (2006) and Deadpool & Wolverine (2024), Ajax in Troy (2004), slasher villain Michael Myers in Halloween (2007) and Halloween II (2009), supervillain Blackstar in the Netflix series Jupiter's Legacy (2021) and supervillain Richard Frank / Torminox in the HBO Max series Doom Patrol (2022–2023).

== Professional wrestling career ==
Born and raised in Saskatoon, Saskatchewan, he graduated from City Park Collegiate Institute. As a teenager, Karolat travelled to Calgary, where he trained briefly with Stu Hart. He later began training with Red Bastien in 1986, and completed further training with Mando Guerrero. Mane began his career in 1986 under the name "Skywalker Nitron" in his native Canada. In 1987 he wrestled as Sky High Lee in Pacific Northwest Wrestling (Portland), billed from California.

In 1987, he wrestled in South Africa, which resulted in an invitation to wrestle for Joint Promotions in the United Kingdom, where he arrived in November. Billed as "'Sky' Walker" he appeared in one match on ITV, a disqualification loss to Pat Roach. His furious reaction to the referee's decision was later incorporated into the standalone wrestling show's title sequence.

The following year, he toured New Japan Pro-Wrestling as "Gully Gaspar", alongside Billy and Barry as a bunch of hockey-masked pirates managed by KY Wakamatsu. He could also be seen in WCW occasionally as the bodyguard of the tag team Doom along with Woman late in 1989, specifically Starrcade 1989.

In 1990, Karolat began wrestling in Puerto Rico and toured with All Japan Pro Wrestling, where he participated in the World's Strongest Tag Determination League. He then joined the Mexican promotion Consejo Mundial de Lucha Libre.

In 1993, he signed with World Championship Wrestling, under the name "Big Sky" and teamed with Vinnie Vegas. After Vegas left WCW to become Diesel in the WWF, Mane was left in limbo and left WCW by the end of the year. In 1994, he joined Herb Abrams' Universal Wrestling Federation and became the only UWF MGM Grand Champion, defeating Steve Ray to win the vacant title. After Abrams' death and eventual dissolving of the UWF in 1996, Mane retired.

== Film and television career ==
In 1992, during his time within Mexico with Consejo Mundial de Lucha Libre, Mane made his film debut in Luchadores de las Estrellas playing the villain of the movie, El Vampiro Interespacial. While part of WCW, he auditioned for and received a part in the television series Smokey and the Bandit.

After retiring from wrestling, he appeared in numerous films, including X-Men as Sabretooth, How to Make a Monster as Hardcore, Joe Dirt, The Scorpion King, Troy as Ajax, Hercules as Antaeus, and The Devil's Rejects in the uncredited role of Rufus. The role of Sabretooth was initially intended for Kevin Nash (Mane's former wrestling tag team partner) but was awarded to Mane due to Nash's scheduling conflicts.

In 2007, he played Michael Myers in Rob Zombie's remake of Halloween. After winning the role, he noted that he consecutively watched seven of the eight Halloween films (excluding the third because Michael Myers does not appear apart from in an ad for the first movie) to better understand his character. He is the tallest actor (6' 8") to portray the character. In 2009, he reprised the role again in Rob Zombie's H2, being only the second actor to play Michael Myers more than once, and the first actor to play the role in consecutive films.

In 2010, he and his wife launched their own production company: Mane Entertainment. Their first feature, Compound Fracture, was released in 2013.

In 2016, Mane co-starred in Fuzz on the Lens Productions comedy/fantasy film Abnormal Attraction, reuniting with Malcolm McDowell (Halloween), Leslie Easterbrook (Compound Fracture) and his wife Renae Geerlings.

In 2019 Mane co-starred in the comedy Playing with Fire alongside fellow professional wrestler John Cena.

On June 28, 2024, it was revealed Mane would reprise his role as Sabretooth in Marvel Studios' Deadpool & Wolverine.

== Personal life ==
Mane was previously married to Jean Goertz from 1988 to 2003 with whom he had two children, a daughter (b. 1995) and a son (b. 1997). He married actress Renae Geerlings on September 3, 2007.

=== Health ===
Mane announced on his social media accounts that he was diagnosed with breast cancer and began chemotherapy treatments on June 8, 2026.

== Filmography ==
=== Film ===
Year	Title	Role	Director	Notes
1992	Luchadores de las estrellas	El Vampiro Interespacial	Rodolfo Lopezreal & Fabián Arnaud (uncredited)	Also known as Starfighters
2000	X-Men	Victor Creed / Sabretooth	Bryan Singer	
2001	Joe Dirt	Bondi	Dennie Gordon	
2001	How to Make a Monster	Hardcore	Television film	
2002	Black Mask 2: City of Masks	Thorn	Tsui Hark	Voiced by Louis Koo in the Cantonese dub version
2003	Red Serpent	Tyler	Gina Tanasescu	
2004	Troy	Ajax	Wolfgang Petersen	
2005	The Devil's Rejects	Rufus "RJ" Firefly, Jr.	Rob Zombie	
2007	07 Spaceys	Himself	Rob Zombie	Television film
2007	Halloween	Michael Myers	Rob Zombie	
2009	Halloween II	Michael Myers	Rob Zombie	
2010	Shooting Gunless	Himself		Television film
2010	Gunless	Jack	William Phillips	
2011	247°F	Wade	Levan Bakhia & Beqa Jguburia	
2013	Prey: The Light in the Dark	Prey	Mike Grier	Short film
2013	Devil May Call	John Reed Smith	Jason Cuadrado	
2014	Compound Fracture	Michael Wolffsen	Anthony J. Rickert-Epstein	Also writer and producer
2015	Take 2: The Audition	Hal Wolfe	Rob Hawk	
2017	Check Point	Deputy Stacks	Thomas J. Churchill	Also associate producer
2017	Victor Crowley	Bernard	Adam Green	
2018	Abnormal Attraction	Bernie 'the Cyclops'	Michael Leavy	
2019	The Silent Natural	Tommy McCarthy	David Risotto	
2019	Miracle in East Texas	Thurman Dial	Kevin Sorbo	Also known as East Texas Oil
2019	Playing with Fire	Axe	Andy Fickman	
2020	Bring Me a Dream	The Sandman	Chase Smith	
2020	Penance Lane	Crimson Matthews	Péter Engert	Also producer
2020	Entrenchment	Andrew Woodsman	Deven Parrish	
2024	Dead North	Bear	Fabrizio Livigni	Short film
2024	Deadpool & Wolverine	Victor Creed / Sabretooth	Shawn Levy	
TBA	Psychosis	Jared McLaren	Jessica Soss & Paul Stevans	Post-production

=== Television ===
Year	Title	Role	Notes
1999	Party of Five	Mr. Mayhem	Episode: "Wrestling Demons"
2000–2002	Son of the Beach	Adolf Manson	2 episodes
2001	V.I.P.	Himself	Episode: "South by Southwest"
2005	Hercules	Antaeus	Miniseries
2006	Monk	Dirk - Motorcycle Rider	Episode: "Mr. Monk and the Big Reward"
2006	My Boys	Doorman	Episode: "Take One for the Team"
2011	Awkward Embraces	The Bagel Guy	Episode: "The Accountant"
2011	Cinemassacre's Monster Madness	Michael Myers	Episode: "Halloween Remakes"; Archive footage
2011–2012	Chopper	Chopper / Jeremiah Carver	Web series; 7 episodes
2014	The Librarians	Minotaur	Episode: "And the Horns of a Dilemma"
2017	Midnight, Texas	Faceless Supernatural	Episode: "Last Temptation of Midnight"
2018	Half Untold	Bayonne	Episode: "Pilot"
2021	Knight's End	Unknown	Episode: "Veritatis"
2021	Jupiter's Legacy	Blackstar	Recurring role; 5 episodes
2022–2023	Doom Patrol	Richard Frank / Torminox	4 episodes

=== Video games ===
Year	Title	Role	Notes
2006	X-Men: The Official Game	Victor Creed / Sabretooth	

=== Music videos ===
Year	Title	Role	Notes
2015	Twiztid: "Boogieman"	The Boogeyman	
2015	Slayer: "Repentless"	Tyler	
2019	Slayer: "The Repentless Killogy"	Tyler	Collection of narrative music videos

== Championships and accomplishments ==
- All Japan Pro Wrestling
  - World's Strongest Tag Determination League New Wave Award (1990) - with Butch Masters
- Pro Wrestling Illustrated
  - PWI ranked him #440 of the 500 best singles wrestlers of the year in the PWI 500 in 1991
- Universal Wrestling Federation
  - UWF MGM Grand Championship (1 time)
