= Cinefamily =

Movie theater in Los Angeles, California, US

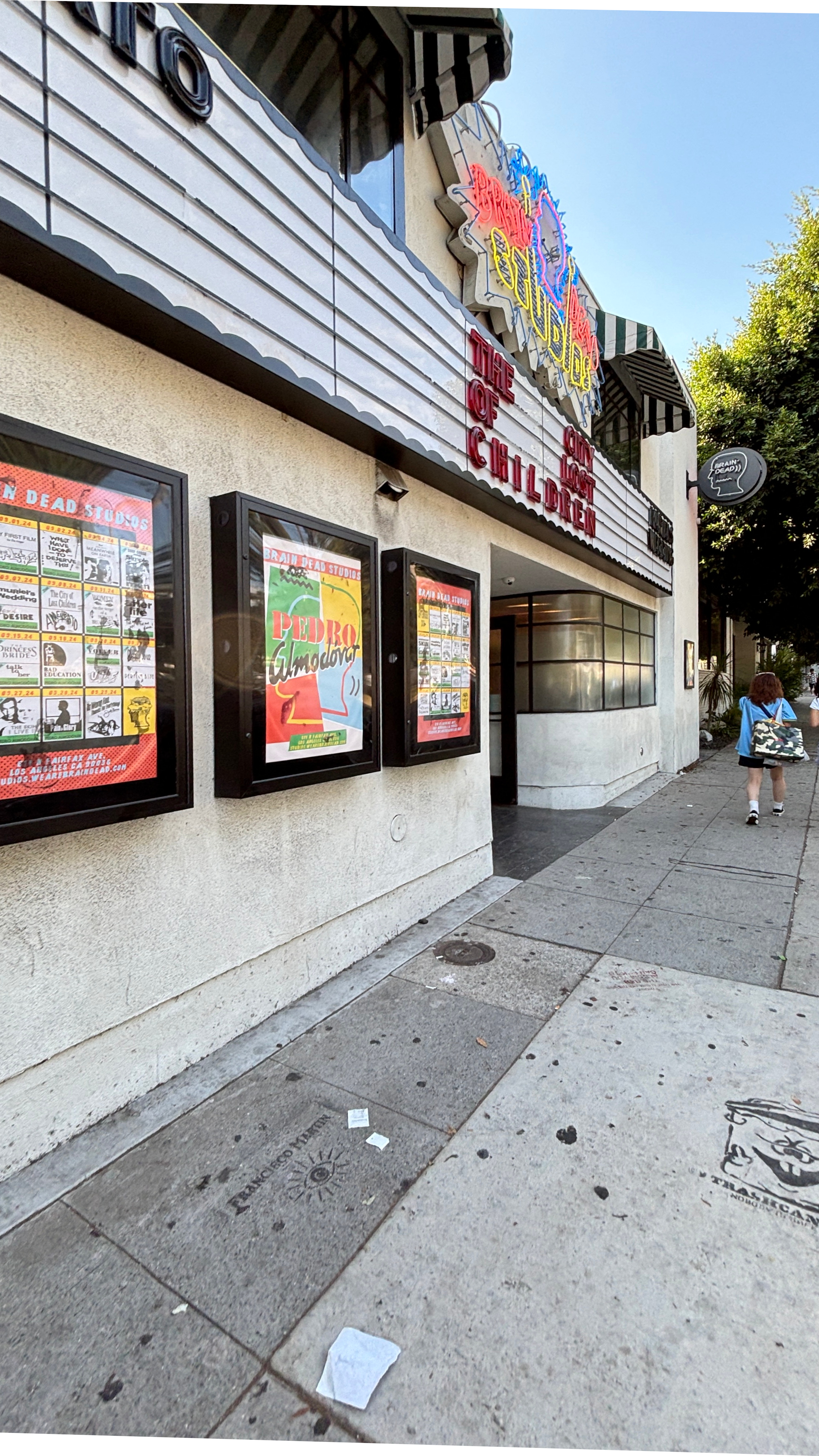
- Outside the Brain Dead Studios, 2024
- Interactive map of Cinefamily
- Capacity: 224

Construction
- Built: 1942
- Opened: October 31, 2007; 19 years ago
- Closed: November 15, 2017; 9 years ago
- Years active: 2007–2017

The Cinefamily was a non-profit cinematheque located in Beverly Grove, Los Angeles, at the historic Silent Movie Theatre. The Cinefamily's mission statement was to "reinvigorate the movie-going experience by fostering a spirit of community and a sense of discovery."

Cinefamily followed a member-based ticketing system by which a tax-deductible donation provided universal access to all screenings and events. There was an individual ticket system in effect for non-members or those who did not make a pledge commitment.

The Cinefamily was open from 2007 to 2017, when it closed due to a sexual harassment allegation. In 2019, the theatre was reopened as Fairfax Cinema. The next year, clothing company Brain Dead announced that they would be leasing the space under the name Brain Dead Studios.

== History ==
The complex originally opened in 1942 as The Silent Movie Theater by silent film collector John Hampton and his wife Dorothy. Until its closure due to low attendance in 1979, Hampton had the largest private collection of silent films, which he exclusively projected in his theater. A year after Hampton's death, the Silent Movie Theater reopened in 1991 and remained active until January 1997 when the theater's owner, Lawrence Austin, was murdered.

In 2007, Hadrian Belove (co-founder of Cinefile Video, a specialty video store), along with Sammy Harkham (co-owner of the nearby Family Bookstore) and his brother Dan, founded the Cinefamily, which officially opened its doors on Halloween of 2007.

=== Programming ===
Cinefamily programming included a range of films, from early silents to contemporary features, live comedy, live music, found footage, mixed media and other special events, and extended form post-screening Q&As. They mounted original retrospectives on filmmakers Jim Henson, Jerry Lewis, John Cassavetes, and Andrzej Zulawski and commissioned live film scores by musicians such as No Age, Stephin Merritt and Espers.

Some of Cinefamily's programming included Animation Breakdown, Don't Knock the Rock, Everything is Festival!, reunion tributes for The Adventures of Pete and Pete and Space Ghost Coast-to-Coast, and women-only pajama party screenings.

After independent film maker Neil Breen's film Double Down was played at the Cinefamily cinematheque in 2010, he amassed a small cult following. In early 2011, the Cinefamily exhibited the Greek independent film Dogtooth, which received an Academy Award nomination within a month of its sold-out run. The Cinefamily also held special screenings of We Need to Talk About Kevin, Margaret, Bullhead, Michael and Battle Royale.

Starting in 2011, Cinefamily held an annual 24-hour holiday telethon. Robert Downey Jr. made an appearance at the second annual event, where he pledged to donate to the theatre's upgrade fundraiser. About $144,000 was raised for the theatre to install digital projection and make restorations. In 2014, Downey and his father, Robert Downey Sr., made appearances in a retrospective for the latter to help raise funds for the theatre, in place of the telethon.

As early as December 2012, artist collective Everything Is Terrible! held events at the theatre. In October 2014, the collective exhibited its full collection of over 7,000 Jerry Maguire VHS tapes in the formation of the "Jerry Throne".

Starting in 2013, the theatre hosted SpectreFest from SpectreVision, an indie horror film company co-founded by Elijah Wood. Also that year, Quentin Tarantino hosted a screening of Robert Blake films, and a retrospective of Kris Kristofferson films was screened, with appearances from Kristofferson, who played music with Harry Dean Stanton at one event.

In 2014, Mel Brooks presented the 1973 compilation film of Your Show of Shows and Werner Herzog made an appearance at the beginning of a weeklong run of his 1979 film Nosferatu: Phantom der Nacht. In 2015, Cinefamily worked with SpectreVision and Cinelicious Pics to restore the 1973 animated Japanese film Belladonna of Sadness.

In 2016, the theatre held an X-Files marathon with a live episode of Kumail Nanjiani's podcast The X-Files Files.

=== Sexual misconduct allegations ===
In August 2017, an anonymous email was sent to Cinefamily members detailing a 2014 sexual harassment allegation against Belove that resulted in a settlement and accused Shadie Elnashai, vice president of the board of directors, of "raping multiple women." Both men subsequently resigned on August 22, 2017. On August 23, Women of Cinefamily co-founder Brie Larson announced that she was stepping aside from the organization for the foreseeable future. Cinefamily itself suspended all operations as of August 26. A number of former volunteers and employees subsequently alleged that an atmosphere of sexism against women had long permeated the theatre, including alleged abuses by Belove and Elnashai.

On November 14, 2017, Cinefamily altered its website so that only a text statement appeared. The board of directors formally announced the end of the organization, following an independent inquiry into the allegations. By January 2018, a website was launched by a former Cinefamily member with self-proclaimed expertise in "economic and workplace justice" to continue investigating alleged wrongdoing by the theatre; this led to the discovery of apparent financial misdeeds. In late 2018, Elnashai released a statement on his personal website. He admitted that he had once acted inappropriately at a Cinefamily party, but denied all other charges, citing an alleged lack of evidence produced by the investigation.

== Rebranding ==
On December 25, 2019, following a year-long refurbishment project, Dan and Sammy Harkham reopened the theatre under the name Fairfax Cinema. On October 6, 2020, clothing company Brain Dead announced that they would be leasing the space. Rebranding the theater as Brain Dead Studios, the venue focuses on cult cinema fare and offers an outdoor cafe specializing in Asian cuisine. In an interview, Brain Dead co-founder Kyle Ng, who was a Cinefamily member, acknowledged the former cinematheque's sexual harassment scandal and stated:

I think it's still important to show to the community that we can't just stop art due to some shitty people. We have to move forward and show a better example. So what we want to do is not just cater to the old White male demographic of cinephiles. We want to basically open it to a new generation while also catering to film heads from before. But the main thing is to introduce new people to film, showcase people who follow our brand but maybe don't know about it, and create a new culture around cinema.

...

My vision is like, Hey, if we see an issue, we got to act upon it and make it better. How do we create this community and make it better? How do we make it more inviting to women, to different sexualities, to different ways of life, and make it better? That's what we've always done with whatever we can. There's no one involved in the programming, or management of the theater, that were previously a part of Cinefamily.
