= Pathogen (film) =

- Promotional poster
- Directed by: Emily Hagins
- Written by: Emily Hagins
- Produced by: Emily Hagins
- Starring: Rose Kent-McGlew; Alec Herskowitz; Tiger Darrow; Tony Vespe; Alex Schroeder
- Cinematography: Emily Hagins
- Edited by: Emily Hagins
- Music by: Cue; Dan Dyer
- Production company: Cheesy Nuggets Productions
- Distributed by: Vinegar Syndrome
- Release date: March 25, 2006
- Running time: 68 minutes
- Country: United States
- Language: English
- Budget: $7,000

Pathogen is a 2006 American independent zombie horror film written, produced and directed by Emily Hagins, who was twelve at the time of the film's production. The film focuses on several middle school students who discover that an infection is turning people into zombies. It premiered at the Alamo Drafthouse Cinema on March 25, 2006, and later released on Blu-ray on March 29, 2022.

== Plot ==
Fourteen-year-old Dannie has recurring nightmares and later finds out that a waterborne disease caused by bacteria begins to spread, but believes that the disease is somehow linked to her dreams. As the disease becomes an epidemic, it's revealed that the disease not only kills those it infects but also turns them into zombies. Dannie and her middle school peers: Sam, Christine, Stacey, and Cameron try to find the solution to the disease while having to fight zombies along the way. Stacy is turned into a zombie during a fight at Dannie's house and after fleeing the house the group comes across a woman named Sue, who worked for the company that accidentally created the infection by trying to create a cure for cancer. Sue and a begrudging Cameron go to a convenience store to get supplies while the rest wait. After waiting 2 hours, the group goes to find them. At the store they find Cameron dead and Sue missing. An argument among the group leads to the revelation that Christine is a traitor and that Sam has carried the infection all along. Sam kills Christine so that she can't hurt anyone and Dannie is forced to kill and decapitate Sam. Dannie Leaves the Store and is attacked by a swarm of zombies.

== Cast ==
- Tiger Darrow as Christine
- Rose Kent-McGlew as Dannie
- Alec Herskowitz as Sam
- Tony Vespe as Cameron
- Alex Schroeder as Stacy
- Rebecca Elliott as Researcher Sue
- Estrella Gonzales as Jen
- C. Robert Cargill as Janitor
- Joy M. Furman as Dannie's Mom
- Ben Gonzalez as News Reporter
- Amanda Haight as Chloe
- Jim Hurley as Health Department Official
- Dannie Helen Loraine Knowles as School Nurse
- Harry Jay Knowles as Voice Actor
- Melissa Martinez as Pharmaceutical Rep
- Natalie Nooner as Ashley
- Jay Giovanni Ramirez as Davey, Zombie Kid
- Jose Ramirez as Doctor
- Sebastian Rosas as Zombie
- Ernest Rosas Roze as Math Teacher / Zombie

== Production ==
Hagins completed the film's script in 2004. Despite adults around her trying to get her to shorten it to be more realistic for a 12 year old to film, she insisted the film be feature length. She cast characters from her friends and classmates and held auditions for some of the uncast parts in her basement with the help of Sue's actress Rebecca Eliot. Filming took place in Austin, Texas after school and on weekends using various locations such as a school and a hospital lobby. Filming was briefly paused due to Haggis having to do homework. After the pause, she got permission from a local convenience store to shoot the final scene there. Hagins counted down to the Release date, referring to it as "Zombie day." However, most of the footage got taped over but Hagins successfully reshot the scenes needed. In 2005, after filming ended, she received a grant from the Texas Filmmakers Production Fund for post-production work, which she used to partially replace equipment necessary for post-production work that had been stolen during the shoot.

== Release ==
Pathogen Premiered at the Alamo Drafthouse Cinema along with a Q&A by Hagins on March 25, 2006.

The Film was Released on Blu-ray by the American Genre Film Archive and Vinegar Syndrome in 2022.

== Reception ==
Dread Central gave Pathogen four out of five blades, commenting that "Although this film was seen as a learning experience, many indie film-makers could learn a few things from it."

== Documentary ==
A documentary entitled Zombie Girl: The Movie was released in 2009, covering the films production and Hagin's filmmaking process. it received a brief theatrical release in Emily's hometown, letting more people know about the film.
