= Alex Saxon (actor) =

American actor

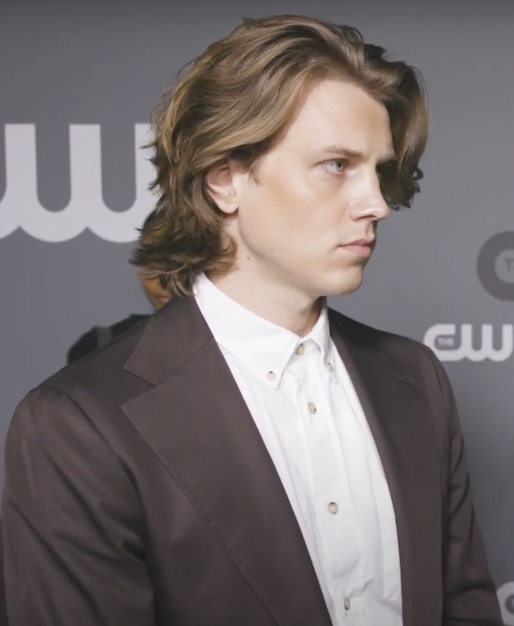
- Saxon in 2019
- Born: Liberty, Missouri, U.S.
- Occupation: Actor
- Years active: 2011–present

Alex Saxon is an American actor known for playing Wyatt in The Fosters, Max in Finding Carter, and Ace in Nancy Drew. He has also had roles in other television series: Awkward (2011); Ray Donovan (2013–2015); and The Mentalist (2015).

His work in film includes The Olivia Experiment (2012), Chapman (2013), and Compound Fracture (2013).

== Early life ==
Saxon grew up in Liberty, Missouri, United States, a suburb of Kansas City.

== Career ==
In 2013, Saxon was cast in a recurring role on The Fosters, a Freeform drama created by Peter Paige and Bradley Bredeweg. He also played the recurring role of Max on the MTV drama Finding Carter. Saxon was only initially hired for the pilot episode of the series but was brought back on a recurring basis after show runner Terri Minsky was impressed by his first scene. He was later informed by Minsky that his character was to be killed off towards the end of the first season. But a month later, he was told that decision had been reversed as both Minsky and network executives found that Saxon as Max was so likeable.

In March 2019, Saxon was cast as Ace in The CW mystery series Nancy Drew.

== Filmography ==
Film appearances by Alex Saxon
Year	Film	Role
2012	The Olivia Experiment	Ace #2
2013	Chapman	Young Paul Holt
2013	The Advocates	Young Henry Bird
2014	Compound Fracture	Brandon
2017	Coin Heist	Jason

Television appearances by Alex Saxon
Year	Film	Role	Notes
2011	Awkward	Vampire guy	Episode: "I Am Jenna Hamilton"
2013–2015	Ray Donovan	Chloe	2 episodes
2013–2018	The Fosters	Wyatt	Recurring role
2014–2015	Finding Carter	Max	Recurring role (season 1); main role (season 2)
2015	Scream: Killer Party	Max	Short Film
2015	The Mentalist	Gabriel Osbourne	Episodes: "Byzantium", "Brown Shag Carpe"
2016	Shooter	Joey Richards	Episode: "Recon by Fire"
2019	The Fix	Gabriel Johnson	Main role
2019–2023	Nancy Drew	Ace H.	Main role
2023	High Desert	Ethan	3 episodes
2024	Criminal Minds	Pete Bailey	1 episode
