= Harry Knowles =

American film critic and writer

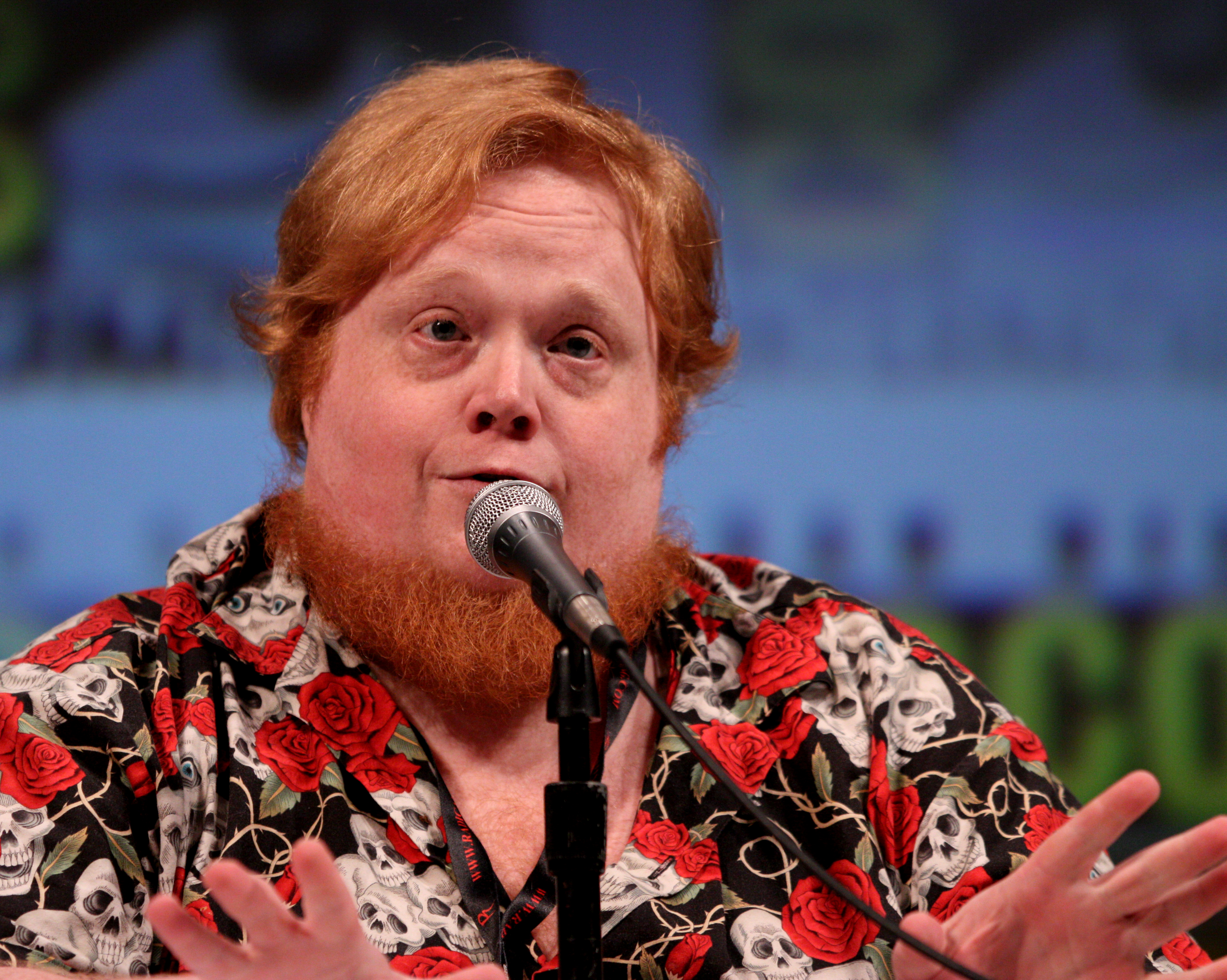
- Knowles at July 2010 San Diego Comic-Con
- Born: Harry Jay Knowles; December 11, 1971 (age 54); Austin, Texas, U.S.
- Occupations: Film critic, writer
- Years active: 1994–2017
- Spouse: Patricia Cho Jones (m. 2007)

Harry Jay Knowles (born December 11, 1971) is an American former film critic and writer known for his website Ain't It Cool News. Knowles was a member of the Austin Film Critics Association until he was removed in September 2017 "by a substantial majority vote" of the organization following allegations of sexual assault.

== Early life ==
Harry Jay Knowles was born in Austin, Texas, the son of Jarrell Jay Knowles and Helen Jane (Harrison) Knowles. Knowles' parents separated in 1983 and divorced March 12, 1984; his mother received custody of him and his younger sister Dannie.

On January 24, 1996, Knowles tripped on a hose at a memorabilia show and injured his back, partially paralyzing his legs. While at home after the accident, Knowles began writing online.

== Career ==
His first semi-professional job was providing weekend box office reports to the Drudge Report. He launched the "Ain't It Cool News" site in 1996, taking its name from a line spoken by John Travolta's character in the film Broken Arrow.

=== Appearances in the media ===
Because of the popularity of the website, Knowles was sought out by the mainstream media, including magazines, newspapers and television news programs. In 2000, he was ranked No. 95 in the Forbes Celebrity 100. Knowles has made guest appearances on the television shows Siskel & Ebert & the Movies and Politically Incorrect.

Knowles is featured in the documentary For the Love of Movies: The Story of American Film Criticism as an advocate of film criticism on the Internet; he articulates the divide between older and younger critics and advocates for the films of Michael Bay, as well as being one of the first major critics to champion genre favorite Adam Green.

=== Film events ===
==== Butt-Numb-a-Thon ====
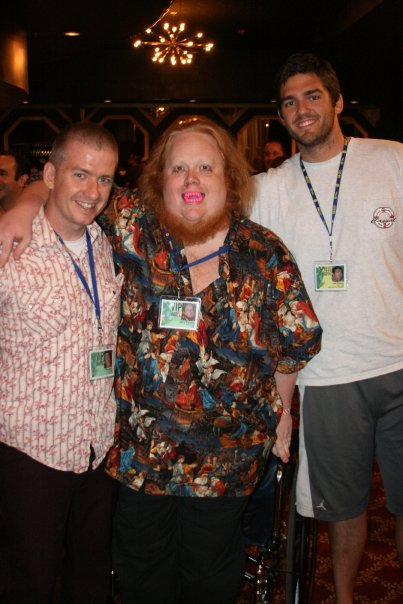
Harry Knowles (center) along with Tim League (left) and Cole Dabney at the 2010 Fantastic Fest

From 1999 to 2016, on the weekend closest to his birthday (December 11), Knowles hosted an event called Butt-Numb-A-Thon. The event, also known as Geek Christmas, was a 24-hour celebration of film, featuring unofficial premieres and vintage films, from classics reprinted for the big-screen, to the rare, weird and unheard of. Film fans and professionals alike traveled from all over the United States and the world to attend the event, which was hosted in Austin at the South Lamar Alamo Drafthouse. BNAT was called "the world's most exclusive and mysteriously secretive film celebration" and "the hardest film event to get into in the country". Following revelations of sexual assault and harassment allegations against Knowles in September 2017, the Alamo Drafthouse, which had been the venue for the festival, ended all association with Knowles.

==== Fantastic Fest ====
Knowles is a co-founder of the annual Fantastic Fest, held in Austin. It was founded in 2005 by Knowles, Tim League of Alamo Drafthouse, Paul Alvarado-Dykstra and Tim McCanlies, writer of The Iron Giant and Secondhand Lions. The festival focuses on genre films such as horror, science fiction, fantasy, action, Asian and cult cinema. The festival takes place in September at the Alamo Drafthouse South Lamar.

On September 21, 2017, days before allegations of sexual assault by Knowles surfaced, it was announced that Ain't It Cool News had been dropped as a sponsor of the festival. On September 25, 2017, the Alamo Drafthouse severed all business ties with Knowles.

== Controversies ==
=== Accusations of biased reviews ===
Knowles attended events offered to the press, paid for by the movie studios, including visits to movie sets and premieres, which led to questions about the resulting impartiality of his articles and reviews. After being flown to the premiere of the 1998 Godzilla movie, he gave the movie a wildly positive review, while the vast majority of critics disliked the film.

In 1999, Knowles praised a script by Drew McWeeny and Scott Swan, but he did not mention that McWeeny was a contributor to the site (writing under the pseudonym "Moriarty"). This and other alleged lapses were reported in a series of articles in Film Threat.

=== Fake Oscar nominees story ===
In early 2000, Knowles posted materials stolen from an ABC staffer's home computer, which Knowles took at face value to be the Oscar nominees for the Academy Awards, a day before the official announcement. When the actual nominees were announced the following day, it was discovered that his finalists in almost every category were incorrect. Knowles acknowledged his error when it became clear he was wrong, but then disclosed the IP address of the person whose computer had been hacked, compounding the error. The academy considered suing Knowles for trademark and copyright infringement, but ultimately decided against it.

=== Feud with Uwe Boll ===
Filmmaker Uwe Boll has long feuded with Knowles, calling him a "retard" in response to his criticisms, and accusing him of being "played" by film studios that "kissed his ass" with set visits and fake interest in producing movies for him, and suggesting to Knowles that the reason he hates him is because "I never kissed your ass, Harry."

=== Texas Chain Saw Massacre claim ===
Gunnar Hansen, the actor who played Leatherface in The Texas Chain Saw Massacre, used Knowles as an example of fans creating fictional personal stories around the film. Knowles had claimed that at his third birthday party, he was treated to a visit from the cast in full costume, and was given a prop dismembered body part used in the making of the film. Hansen adamantly denied that any of this ever occurred.

=== Tax delinquency ===
By 2013, following the rise and fall of Ain't It Cool News in popularity, the site owed about $300,000 in unpaid taxes.

=== Sexual assault allegations ===
On September 23, 2017, it was reported on IndieWire and circulated in other national media that Knowles had allegedly sexually assaulted a woman named Jasmine Baker on two occasions in 1999 and 2000 at Alamo Drafthouse events in Austin; furthermore, Baker stated that, while Drafthouse's co-founders Tim and Karrie League were horrified to learn of the incident, they "didn't know what to do" and suggested that she "just avoid" Knowles, who denied the accusation.

In response to the story, a number of Ain't It Cool News contributors resigned from the site. Ain't It Cool writer Horrorella announced her departure on September 24. Longtime writers Steve Prokopy, who used the pseudonym "Capone", and Eric Vespe, known as "Quint", both of whom had been with the site since its beginnings, announced September 25 that they were leaving Ain't It Cool News.

On September 25, Alamo Drafthouse owner Tim League announced that the company, whose theater had served as home to the annual Butt-Numb-A-Thon film fest Knowles organized, had severed all ties with Knowles as a result of the controversy, while the Austin Film Critics Association voted to remove Knowles as a member of the group.

By September 26, four more women had come forward on social media and through interviews with IndieWire to accuse Knowles of sexual assault and sexual harassment.

Following the release of the additional women's allegations, Knowles announced on social media on September 26, 2017 that he was taking a leave of absence from Ain't It Cool News.

On March 11, 2020, Knowles published a post titled "An Apology" on the site, three years after the accusations.

=== Criticism of writing ===
Knowles's reviews have been described as misogynistic. In a 2022 retrospective piece, Slate writer Jason Bailey dubbed Knowles' review of Blade II "quite possibly the worst movie review ever published, at least in an outlet of note," highlighting its numerous technical flaws, shallow analysis of the movie, blatant conflicts of interest, and graphic extended metaphors comparing the viewing experience to cunnilingus.

== Personal life ==
Knowles married Patricia Cho Jones on July 15, 2007, at Green Pastures in Austin.

On April 4, 2008, Knowles announced that he was diagnosed as a type 2 diabetic. In January 2011, Knowles underwent emergency spinal surgery to his T-10 vertebra. According to Knowles, the surgery restored sensation in his legs for the first time in over 15 years, and he would be undergoing physical therapy to learn to walk again.

== Film credits ==
- The Ballad of the Sad Café (1991)
- Colin Fitz Lives! (1997)
- The Faculty (1998)
- Monkeybone (2001)
- Ghosts of Mars (2001)
- The Texas Chainsaw Massacre (2003)
- No Pain, No Gain (2005)
- Pathogen (2006)
- Zombie Girl: The Movie (2008)
- My Sucky Teen Romance (2011)
- Comic-Con Episode IV: A Fan's Hope (2011)

== Portrayals ==
He was played by Ethan Suplee in the 2009 movie Fanboys.
