= Butt-Numb-A-Thon =

Film marathon in Austin, Texas

- Location: Austin, Texas, United States
- Founded: December 1999
- Disestablished: September 2017
- Hosted by: Harry Knowles
- Language: English

The Butt-Numb-A-Thon (also known as BNAT) was a film marathon held in Austin, Texas every December from 1999 to 2016. It was hosted by Harry Knowles of Ain't It Cool News in celebration of his birthday. The festival showed 24 hours of vintage films, as well as premieres.

Following revelations of sexual assault accusations against Knowles in September 2017, the festival ceased.

== Event admission ==
The marathon was invite-only via an application process. Before BNAT 5 in 2003, there were typically two ways to gain admittance – one for Austin residents that usually involved some event, such as BNAT 4 in 2002 having a costume contest at a horror movie screening at an abandoned mental institution on Halloween, then a separate one for those not in the Central Texas area. After BNAT 5, the application process was changed to internet-only involving several essay-style questions and submissions of pictures.

== Films and notable guests ==
Films that were shown include the first public screening of Mel Gibson's The Passion of the Christ, as well as The Lord of the Rings trilogy, Dreamgirls, Chicago, Black Snake Moan, Snatch, Magnolia, Knocked Up, Frozen, 300, V for Vendetta, Kingsman: The Secret Service, and the 2005 remake of King Kong. Guests have included Mel Gibson, Zack Snyder, Peter Jackson, Seth Rogen, Adam Green, Eli Roth, Craig Brewer, Bill Condon, Vin Diesel, Guillermo del Toro, Jackie Earle Haley, McG and C. Robert Cargill.

Some celebrity guests, such as Eli Roth, Rian Johnson, Joseph Gordon-Levitt, Laura Harris and Elijah Wood have attended the event, even though they may not have had any films exhibited. Though he was not present for the screening of King Kong in 2005, Peter Jackson introduced the film with a video-taped message, in which he was seen pointing at various locations inside the Drafthouse theater, such as the stage area and specific seats, showing intimate knowledge of the theater from previous visits.

== Style ==
BNAT was home to numerous special screenings and celebrity guest appearances, and showed 12-13 films and 30-40 vintage film trailers back-to-back over a 24-hour period.

BNAT featured acts like a live band accompanying Buster Keaton's The General, the delivery of fresh meat pies to attendees during the early screening of Sweeney Todd, shot glasses of caviar and vodka given to attendees to mirror a scene in The Curious Case of Benjamin Button, and the use of electrically shocking devices to zap sleeping audience members during an intentionally interminable 3:00am viewing of 1950s film The Giant Gila Monster.

== Location ==
Butt-Numb-A-Thon was held annually in Austin, Texas, for the first eight years at the Alamo Drafthouse's (now closed) original downtown location at 409 Colorado Street. In 2007, BNAT 9 was held at the Alamo Drafthouse Ritz location at 310 E. Sixth Street. After 2008, the festival was held at the Alamo Drafthouse South Lamar at 1120 South Lamar Boulevard. BNAT 15 in 2013 was held at the Alamo Drafthouse Ritz location, while the Alamo Drafthouse Lamar underwent renovation.

On June 24, 2007, as an acknowledgment of the last days of the Alamo Drafthouse's original downtown location, Knowles hosted a hastily assembled half-birthday marathon titled "Half-Ass-A-Thon". Half-Ass-A-Thon was to initially only show four features, but by unanimous vote of the audience the marathon was extended to five features.

== End of festival ==
Following revelation a few days prior of allegations of sexual assault and sexual harassment against Knowles, the Alamo Drafthouse, which served as the venue for BNAT, announced on Sept. 25, 2017 that it was cutting all ties with Knowles.

Knowles himself stepped down from contributing to Ain't It Cool News in the aftermath of the charges.
