= The Insomniac (2013 film) =

2013 film by Monty Miranda

- Directed by: Monty Miranda
- Written by: Eddy Salazar; Peter Kenneth Jones
- Produced by: Romina
- Starring: Eddy Salazar; Clare Grant; John Heard; Danny Trejo; Keith Szarabajka
- Cinematography: Jarrett Sexton
- Edited by: Thomas A. Krueger
- Music by: Ron Fish
- Production companies: Welcome Home Productions; Animor Studios
- Release date: December 27, 2013
- Running time: 103 minutes
- Country: United States
- Language: English

The Insomniac is a 2013 American whodunit psychological thriller written by Eddy Salazar and Peter Kenneth Jones, and directed by Monty Miranda. The feature film stars Salazar in the title role, Clare Grant, Keith Szarabajka, John Heard, and Danny Trejo. The Insomniac centers around John Figg (Salazar), a financial adviser who develops a severe case of self-induced insomnia after the house he recently inherited from his deceased father gets brutally ransacked and robbed. While the movie's most noticeable source of inspiration came from Alfred Hitchcock's Rear Window, there are a number of references to other past insomnia-themed movies, such as The Machinist, and Insomnia. A strong recurring theme throughout the film is the attachment one gets for material possessions.

== Plot ==
After the sudden loss of his father, John Figg (Salazar) moves back into his childhood home in Glendale, California. There, he begins his life anew with his trusty dog Timber, his soon-to-be fiancée Martha (Grant), and his new job promotion from his quirky boss Paul Epstein (Heard).

Two days after moving in, however, his dad's classic car is stolen. The day after that, after a successful meeting with his biggest client, Jairo Torres (Trejo), he goes home to find his house completely ransacked and robbed, his dog missing, and his father's ashes scattered on the ground. Convinced a robbery will happen again, John chooses to stay awake until he catches the culprit responsible for the break in. As days go by without sleep, John's angst develops into paranoia, his paranoia develops into obsession, and his obsession into madness.

After thirteen full days without any sleep, John is pushed to the edge. Disregarding the help from his friends and loved ones, John goes to any length - even murder - to figure out who committed the heinous crime.

== Cast ==
- Eddy Salazar as John Figg
- Clare Grant as Martha Collins
- Danny Trejo as Jairo Torres
- John Heard as Paul Epstein
- Keith Szarabajka as Ted Lemont
- Romina as Amy Clover
- Alimi Ballard as Officer Flores
- Brett DelBuono as Tommy Lemont
- Spencer Berger as Andrew Booker
- Steve Agee as Gun Dealer
- Stan Harrington as Officer Pollack
- Dante Swain as Frank
- Elvis Dino Esquivel as "Night"
- Amy Jo Traicoff as Winnie Lemont

== Production ==
The Insomniac is the second feature film directed by Monty Miranda. His first film, Skills Like This (which stars Spencer Berger, who plays Andrew Booker in The Insomniac), won the award for Best Narrative Feature at the South by Southwest film festival. Salazar came up with the idea for the script when he caught someone breaking into his house after a scheduled meeting was canceled. Although nothing happened to him or his house, Salazar didn't sleep at all, thinking about what could've happened if he went to the meeting. On a radio interview, Salazar revealed that he couldn't sleep profoundly for two weeks due to the ambient sounds outside his house, fearing that someone was trying to break in again. This led to the writing of the script.

Principal photography took only 18 days, with two extra days for pick-ups.

Romina, who plays Amy Clover, produced the film. Salazar's Welcome Home Productions, LLC. was the production company behind the film and Grand Entertainment Group is distributing.

== Release ==
The first trailer was released on The Insomniac Official Website on 2012. It premiered in the Dances With Films Festival on Thursday, June 6, 2013 at the TCL Chinese Theatre. The film has since won awards at the Action On Film International Film Festival, Breckenridge Festival of Film, Great Lakes Film Festival, Indie Fest USA and Fort. Lauderdale International Film Festival. The film was nominated for an award in virtually every festival it screened at and won Best Dialogue at Action on Film, Best Screenplay at Breckenridge, and Best Feature Film at Indie Fest USA. The film was released in the United States and Canada on January 21, 2014 through Grand Entertainment Group.

== Reception ==
The Insomniac has received generally favorable or mixed reviews from critics. Dances with Films stated, "this well-directed crime thriller has exceptional production value and intense scenes that take us down the road to paranoia-villa."

=== Critical response ===
Leonardo Santana at Summit Daily News wrote, "If Agatha Christie and Roman Polanski got together for a cup of coffee – or, more likely, over proof rum mixed with black tea, also known as a Jägertee -- they would come up with a story line close to The Insomniac, a risky film oscillating between a classic melodrama and an up-tempo thriller." Santana continued praising the film in his review; "Though the story dabbles psychological terror, it never loses its sense of comedy. Grab a love story measure, add a whodunnit film touch, a pinch of horror and a heavy load of elegant camera work and photography. Blend them, and you'll get The Insomniac.

Sean Hill at Film Snobbery wrote, "The film is really good at making it pace slow so the audience is able to see John’s slow descent into his obsession." Hill also added he "enjoyed the majority of the film and its good directing effort by Monty Miranda and would like to see what he does next." Regarding Salazar's writing, Hill states that he "would also be interested to see him write another screenplay as it is a solid effort as well."

Inkoo Kang of The Village Voice stated, "For most of its run, the film is a tribute to unimaginative competence, confidently venturing where so many movies have ventured before. But in the last few scenes, the script offers a solid twist and a cynical social critique, the latter coming out of nowhere but still somehow managing to work." Regarding Salazar's performance, Kang writes, "the actor brings a shiny-eyed intensity to the manic scenes."
