= Clare Grant =

American actress and producer

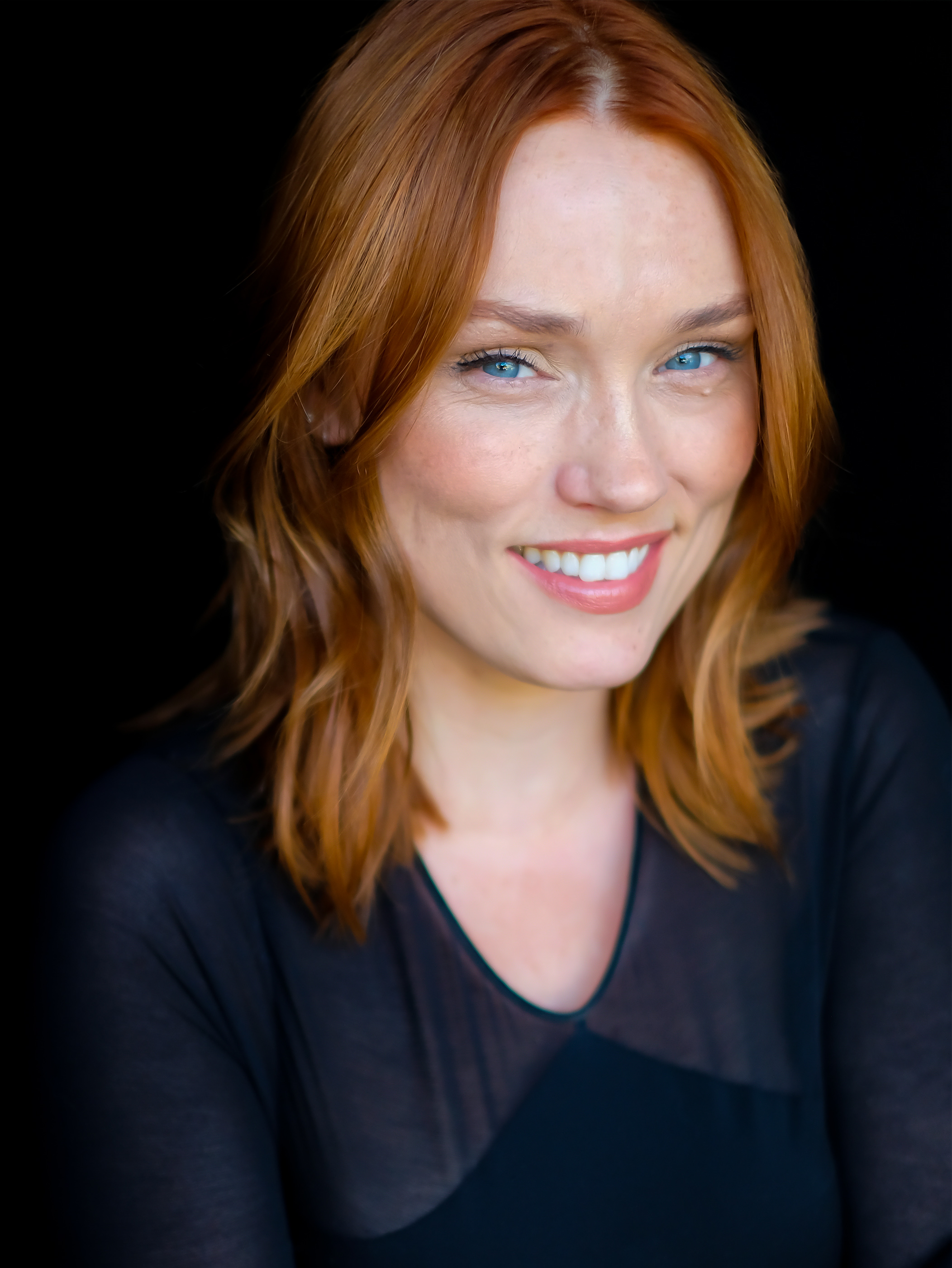
- Grant in 2018
- Occupations: Actress; model; producer
- Years active: 2004–present
- Known for: Team Unicorn
- Spouse: Seth Green (m. 2010)
- Children: 1

Clare Grant is an American actress, model and producer. She co-founded Team Unicorn, which has produced several web series and music video parodies including "Geek and Gamer Girls" and "All About That Base". She also appeared in 2023 comedy horror film Hanky Panky.

== Early life ==
Grant was born on August 23, 1979 and grew up in Memphis, Tennessee. She is of Scottish, English, Scandinavian, and Native American descent. To support herself through college, Grant modeled through Elite Model Management on several campaigns, for companies such as L'Oréal.

== Career ==
=== Film work ===
Grant had a small role in Walk the Line and has appeared in several independent films. Craig Brewer cast her as the lead in two of his indie films before casting her in the film Black Snake Moan as Christina Ricci's best friend, and later as the lead in his MTV series $5 Cover. She then played the lead role of Megan Graves in comic book writer Brian Pulido's first independent feature film The Graves, followed by the role of Beverly in the film Joshua Tree, 1951: A Portrait of James Dean, directed by Matthew Mishory. In 2013, Grant played the lead role of Martha Collins in the film The Insomniac, directed by Monty Miranda, and voiced Black Widow in the Marvel Animation film Iron Man: Rise of Technovore. In 2015, Grant played a supporting role in Phantom Halo and appeared in the holiday anthology film Holidays, a featured selection of the 2016 Tribeca Film Festival. She appeared in Changeland alongside her husband Seth Green, who wrote, directed, and also starred in the film.

=== Television work ===
Grant's first television role was in an episode of Masters of Horror, followed by the series lead role on the MTV series $5 Cover, about the trials and tribulations of the current Memphis music scene, created by Craig Brewer. Since then, Grant has appeared in guest starring roles on shows such as Castle, CSI: Miami and Warren the Ape. She voiced various characters in Robot Chicken and Mad, Latts Razzi in Star Wars: The Clone Wars, and Titania in Hulk and the Agents of S.M.A.S.H. and Avengers Assemble.

In October 2006, Grant appeared as "Babe of the Month" in a non-nude pictorial in Playboy.

In 2013, Grant co-created, produced, and starred in a pilot based on Team Unicorn, of which she is a member.

In 2020, she appeared as herself in the DC Universe unscripted gaming series DC Universe All Star Games.

=== Other projects ===
Under their company Danger Maiden Productions, Grant and partner Rileah Vanderbilt produced the viral online series Saber. In 2010, the duo began working with Milynn Sarley and Michele Boyd to create the online series Team Unicorn. The team's first project, "Geek and Gamer Girls" (a parody of Katy Perry's "California Gurls"), paid tribute to their shared mutual passion of gaming, manga, and science fiction. It had over a million views in its first week, but received mixed responses to its portrayal of women. This was followed by other viral videos, most notably "All About that Base", a parody of the hit song by Meghan Trainor with a Star Wars theme. Grant guest-starred in the second season of the Jane Espenson-scripted romantic comedy web series Husbands, and has made appearances on webseries such as The Guild, Save the Supers, Q.V.G., and Tabletop. In 2013, Grant starred as Mala in a Wonder Woman fan short film.

In the 2019 Fortnite World Cup, Grant and her partner Jacob won 1st place in the second round of the Pro-AM Tournament, and 4th place overall, winning $100,000 for charity.

== Personal life ==
Grant first met actor Seth Green in 2006 at the Golden Apple Comics. They married on May 1, 2010, at Skywalker Ranch; the ceremony was officiated by Grant's long-time friend Craig Brewer. Green revealed in an October 2025 interview with Bill Maher that they have a two-year-old child together.

== Filmography ==
=== Film ===
Year	Title	Role	Notes
2004	Resolutions of the Complacent Man	Museum Curator	Supporting
2005	Walk the Line	Audrey Parks	Supporting
2006	Send in the Clown	Blair Watson	Supporting
2006	Happenstance	Cara	Lead
2006	Black Snake Moan	Kell	Supporting
2007	House Of Fur	Holly	Lead
2009	The Graves	Megan Graves	Lead
2010	Daylight Fades	Shauna	Supporting
2011	Jem Girls (and Boys!) Remember	Herself	Documentary, Commentator
2011	Light Masters	Claire	Lead
2011	No Rest for the Wicked: A Basil & Moebius Adventure	Lucy	Supporting
2012	Joshua Tree, 1951: A Portrait of James Dean	Beverly	Supporting
2013	Dragonfyre	Anathema (voice)	Lead
2013	The Insomniac	Martha Collins	Lead
2013	Iron Man: Rise of Technovore	Black Widow (voice)	Lead
2013	The Return of Return of the Jedi: 30 Years and Counting	Herself	Commentator
2014	Video Games: The Movie	Herself	Commentator
2015	Phantom Halo	Carlene	Supporting
2015	Mega Shark vs Kolossus	Unicorn Squad Pilot Clare	Supporting
2016	Holidays	Sara	Lead
2016	Meat Cute	Madison	Lead
2016	Dance Baby Dance	Camille	Supporting
2019	Confessions of a Producer	Tara Aluran	Lead
2019	American Typecast	Sharon	Supporting
2019	Godzilla: King of the Monsters	Fighter Pilot	Cameo
2019	Changeland	Dory	Supporting
2019	SEEK	Jordan	Lead
2020	Deadly Love Letter	Amelia	Lead
2020	The Private Eye	Michelle	Lead
2024	Hanky Panky	Kelly	Supporting

=== Television series ===
Year	Title	Role	Network	Notes
2006	Masters of Horror	Valerie	Showtime	Episode: "Valerie on the Stairs"
2008	Terrorvision: Follower	Heather	Sony	Pilot, lead
2008–18	Robot Chicken	Various voices	Adult Swim	6 episodes
2009	$5 Cover	Clare	MTV	Lead role
2010	Warren the Ape	Clare	MTV	Episode: "Amends"
2011	CSI: Miami	Connie Briggs	CBS	Episode: "Wheels Up"
2011	FearNet"s "Movies With More Brains"	Herself	Fearnet	Commentator
2011	Chiller 13: Horror's Creepiest Kids	Herself	Chiller	Commentator
2011–13	Mad	Various voices	Cartoon Network	5 episodes
2012	G4's Top 100 Video Games Of All Time	Herself	G4	Commentator
2012	Robot Chicken DC Comics Special	Cheetah, Ice, Abby Holland	Adult Swim	Voice
2012–13	Star Wars: The Clone Wars	Latts Razzi (voice)	Cartoon Network	3 episodes
2013	Chiller 13: Most Horrifying Hook-ups	Herself	Chiller	Commentator
2013	Chiller 13: Great American Slashers	Herself	Chiller	Commentator
2013–15	Hulk and the Agents of S.M.A.S.H.	Titania (voice)	Disney XD	3 episodes
2014	Robot Chicken DC Comics Special II	Poison Ivy, Catwoman, Little Girl (voice)	Adult Swim	Guest Star
2014	Team Unicorn Saturday Action Fun Hour (pilot for Adult Swim)	Jade Verdant	Adult Swim	Lead, executive producer, co-creator
2015	Avengers Assemble	Titania (voice)	Disney XD	Episode: "Small Time Heroes"
2015–16	Dinner at Tiffani's	Self	Cooking Channel	2 episodes
2016	Castle	Nina O'Keefe	ABC	Episode: "Witness for the Prosecution"
2020	DC Universe All Star Games	Herself	DC Universe	Series 1, 5 episodes

=== Web series ===
Year	Title	Role	Notes
2009	Saber	Sith	Lead, co-creator, producer
2010	Ultradome	Indiana Jones	1 episode: "Han Solo vs. Indiana Jones", guest star
2010	Here and Now	Paige	Supporting
2010–14	Team Unicorn	Green Unicorn	All episodes, series lead, executive producer, co-creator, lead singer
2011	The Guild	Red Master Chief	5 episodes, recurring
2011	Nightmare Slayers	Lexie	Pilot, lead
2012	Saber 2: The Body Wash Strikes Back	Sith	Lead, co-creator, producer
2012	Save the Supers	Deathstiny's Child	Episode: "The Super Force vs. The End"
2012–13	Husbands	Jessie	3 episodes
2012	Fan Wars	Team Bruce Wayne	Episode: "Bruce Wayne vs. Tony Stark"
2013	QVG	Mandy Breckinridgemeyerton	Series lead, all episodes
2013–17	Tabletop	Herself	3 episodes
2013	Wonder Woman	Mala	Supporting
2014	Sab3r: Revenge of the Threesome	Sith Lord Candi	Lead, producer
2014	Nerdist Presents: Duo	Harley Quinn	Supporting
2015	Con Man	Green Unicorn	Guest Star
2018	Spellslingers	Herself	Guest

=== Music videos ===
Year	Title	Artist
2004	"Jump In"	Carson & Poole
2005	"I'm in the Mood"	Alabama
2006	"The Grand Conjuration"	Opeth
2006	"The New Black"	Every Time I Die
2007	"Subterfuge"	Dååth
2010	"G33K & G4M3R Girls"	Team Unicorn
2012	"Poker Face"	tb5
2013	"For the Win"	Team Unicorn
2014	"All About that Base"	Team Unicorn

== Awards and nominations ==
Year	Award	Category	Title of work	Result
2009	The Official Star Wars Fan Film Awards	Best Action	Saber	Won
2009	The Official Star Wars Fan Film Awards	Audience Choice	Saber	Won
2010	LA Weekly's Best of 2010	Best Online Video	Team Unicorn: G33K & G4M3R Girls	Won
2011	Dragon Con 2011 Film Festival Awards	Best Music Video	Team Unicorn: G33K & G4M3R Girls	Nominated
2012	International Academy of Web Television Awards	Best Variety Series	Team Unicorn	Nominated
2013	The Geekie Awards	One Shot for Best Geek Culture	Saber 2: Return of the Body Wash	Nominated
2014	Behind the Voice Actors Award	Breakthrough Voice Actress of the Year		Nominated
