= Michele Boyd =

American actress, producer and host

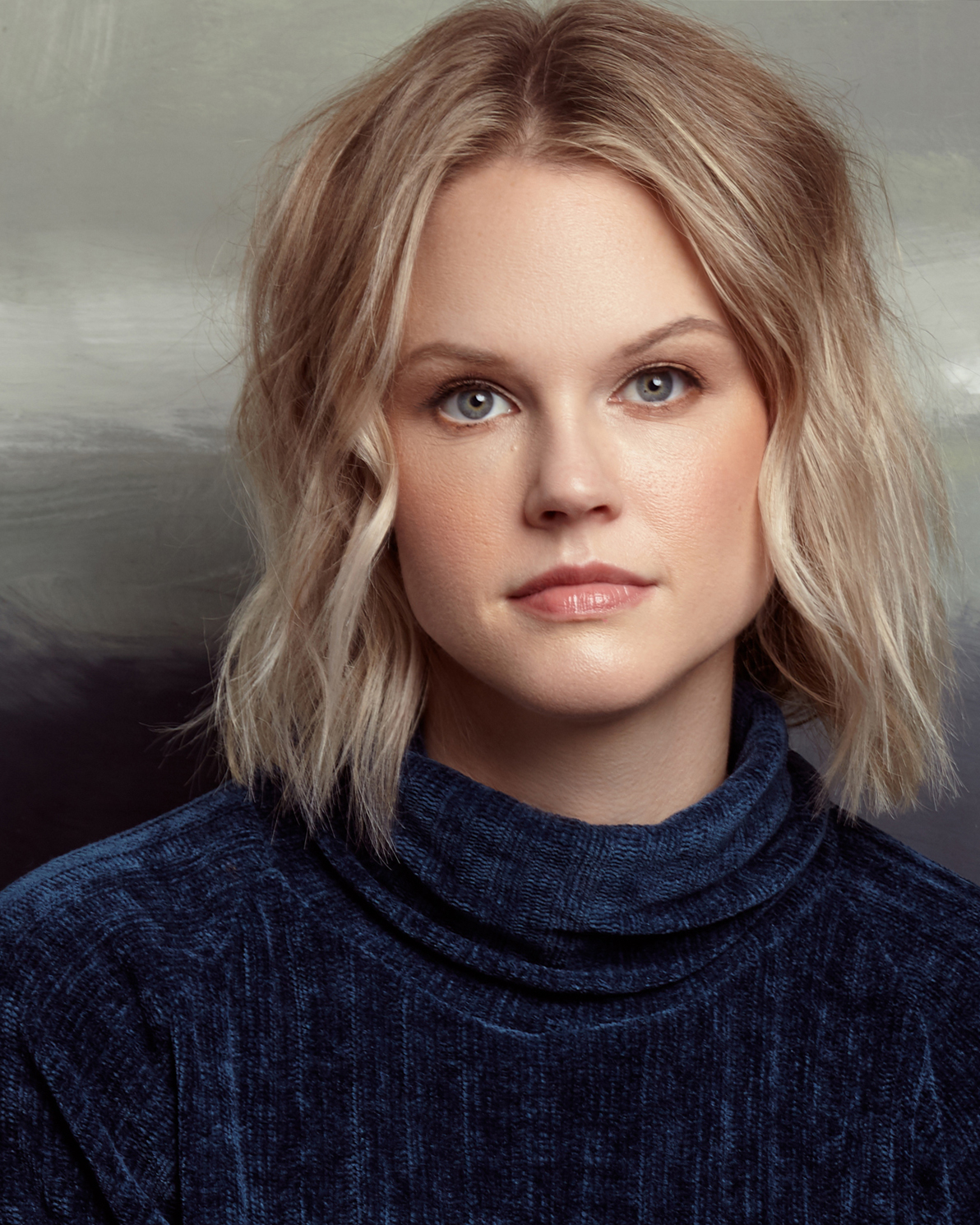
- Michele Boyd in 2019
- Born: October 29, 1980 (age 45); Gainesville, Florida, U.S.
- Occupations: Actress, producer, host
- Years active: 2006–present
- Website: www.micheleboyd.com

Michele Boyd (born October 29, 1980) is an American actress, producer and host. She co-founded the geek girl parody group Team Unicorn and played Riley in the popular webseries The Guild.

== Early life and education ==
Boyd was born to a Navy family in Gainesville, Florida, on October 29, 1980. She received her Bachelor of Science degree in Neurobiology, Physiology and Behavior from the University of California, Davis, and before settling into her career as an actress, she studied behavior at Harvard Medical School.

== Career ==
After receiving her bachelor's degree, Boyd modeled in New York City before moving to Los Angeles and quickly landing roles on the television shows Sons of Anarchy, The Young and the Restless, and How I Met Your Mother. She utilized her science background cohosting the show Machines of Malice as a neuroscience consultant for the Discovery Channel. Boyd is also a Nickelodeon show favorite, guest starring on the shows iCarly, True Jackson, VP and Big Time Rush.

In 2009, Boyd appeared on 14 episodes of the popular web series The Guild. In 2010, Boyd co-created the geek girl group Team Unicorn. Their first music video was "G33k & G4m3r Girls", a parody of Katy Perry's "California Gurls"; it achieved over one million views in its first week. In 2013, Adult Swim announced they would be producing a Team Unicorn television pilot.

She cohosted the series Game Changers, a Top Gear-influenced show testing out video game tropes such as jet packs, parkour and lockpicking in the real world. She has also modeled for the J!NX gamers clothing line and was named one of GeekWeek.com's "10 Hottest Geek Girls". Boyd was also referenced in Diablo III from Blizzard Entertainment as a rare unicorn character named "Miss Hell" alongside other Team Unicorn members. She starred in Geek Cred, an office comedy set in a comic book store.

Her feature film Bar America, directed by Matthew Jacobs, premiered at the Santa Catalina Film Festival in 2014.

Boyd was the cohost of Watching Thrones, a live Game of Thrones recap/discussion show. Watching Thrones aired on Screen Junkies, an Emmy-nominated online movie magazine and YouTube channel with over six million subscribers and over 1.6 billion views.

In 2018, she became part of the reboot S.W.A.T. with Shemar Moore. She plays the character Valerie Rocker.

== Filmography ==
=== Television ===
Year	Title	Role	Notes
2006	Untold Stories of the E.R.	Katey Wilks	Episode: "Director Down"
2007	Diagnosis X	Stephanie Yates	Episode: "Under Pressure"
2008	The Young and the Restless	Carol	Episode: "#1,9021"
2008	Sons of Anarchy	Medical Intern	Episode: "Old Bones"
2008–2009	Machines of Malice	Herself	Host - 6 episodes
2009	Cold Case	Hockey Groupie '80	Episode: "Iced"
2010	FlashForward	Nurse	Episode: "Revelation Zero: Part 2"
2010	How I Met Your Mother	Jolene	Episode: "Robots Versus Wrestlers"
2010	True Jackson, VP	Nicole	Episode: Trapped in Paris"
2011	Big Time Rush	Annie Winters	Episode: "Big Time Contest"
2011	Fearnet's "Movies with More Brains"	Herself	Commentator
2012	G4's "Top 100 Video Games of All Time"	Herself	Commentator
2013	Chiller 13's "Most Horrifying Hookups"	Herself	Commentator
2014	Two and a Half Men	Nurse	
2015	Workaholics	Bride	
2017	NCIS: Los Angeles	EMT	
2017	The Last Tycoon	Minna Double	
2018	S.W.A.T.	Valerie Rocker	Recurring
2019	The Orville	Lieutenant Dorsett	Episode: "Nothing Left on Earth Excepting Fishes"
2019	NCIS	Chief Petty Officer Emily Ross	Episode: "Silent Service"
2019	The Young and The Restless	Sara	Episode: "#1.11661"
2022	Westworld	Temperance Armistice	Episode: "Années Folles" (S4:E3)

=== Film ===
Year	Title	Role	Notes
2005	Waiting	Young Wife	Supporting
2008	Incrimination	Elsa Mitchells	Lead
2008	The Memo	Michele	Supporting
2009	Slick	Elsa Mitchells	Lead
2011	Cheerleader Massacre 2	Janice	Lead
2011	Battle of Los Angeles	Lt. Jean Hendricks	Supporting
2011	3 Musketeers	Aramis	Lead
2011	Love Begins	Girl 2	Supporting
2012	D.N.E: Do Not Erase	Sophie	Lead (alongside Richard Hatch)
2013	Resident Evil: Vengeance	Claire Redfield	Lead
2013	Bar America	Emily	Lead
2014	Altergeist	Taylor Miller	Supporting

=== Internet series ===
Year	Title	Role	Notes
2009	Penny Dreadfuls	Beauty	Episode: "Sleeping Beauty"
2010	Bumps in the Night	Claire	Episode: "The Haunted Apartment"
2009–2010	The Guild	Riley (Stupid Tall Hot Girl)	14 Episodes
2010–2011	SOLO – The Series	Rebecca Drizhal	All episodes
2010–2013	Team Unicorn	Blue Unicorn	6 episodes
2012	Sound Advice	Becky	Episode: "Clap Clap Clap"
2012	TableTop	Featured Guest	Episode: "Gloom"
2012	The Jeff Lewis 5 Minute Comedy Hour	Actress	Episode: "Poker"
2013	Spellslingers	Featured Guest	Episode 4
2014	Geek Cred	Callie	All episodes

== Awards and nominations ==
Year	Award	Category	Title of work	Result
2010	LA Weekly's Best of 2010	Best Online Video	Team Unicorn: G33K & G4M3R Girls	Won
2011	Dragon Con 2011 Film Festival Awards	Best Music Video	Team Unicorn: G33K & G4M3R Girls	Nominated
2012	International Academy of Web Television Awards	Best Variety Series	Team Unicorn	Nominated
