= North Hollywood Medical Center =

Coordinates: 34°9′28.86″N 118°24′31.22″W

Geography
- Location: 12629 Riverside Drive, North Hollywood, Los Angeles, California, United States

Services
- Beds: 160

History
- Opened: 1952
- Closed: 1998
- Demolished: 2011

Links
- Lists: Hospitals in California

North Hollywood Medical Center (Medical Center of North Hollywood) was a hospital, operating from 1952 to 1998, in the community of Valley Village, a district in the San Fernando Valley region of the city of Los Angeles.

The hospital is famed as the filming location, from 2001 to 2008, of the multiple award-winning hospital comedy television show Scrubs.

Located at 12629 Riverside Drive, the building was demolished in mid-2011. In February 2013, IMT Residential opened a new apartment complex on the site.

== Medical hospital ==
North Hollywood Medical Center was opened in 1952 as "Valley Doctors Hospital", a small private hospital with 160 beds and an emergency room.

The hospital was sold to Hyatt Medical and re-opened in 1973 as "Riverside Hospital", reflecting its location on Riverside Drive and beside the Los Angeles River, on the south bank of its concrete channel.

In 1976, foreshadowing its future use as a permanent film set, Riverside Hospital was used to film scenes of the original TV movie of the "Having Babies" movie and series franchise.

The name was changed to "Medical Center of North Hollywood" following misplaced negative publicity caused in late 1981 when nurse Robert Diaz was charged with murdering 12 hospital patients in unrelated hospitals in Riverside County, California.

In 1997, North Hollywood Medical Center teamed with the USC University Hospital to operate a Family Practice Residency Program at North Hollywood. The relationship was facilitated by the fact that both hospitals were then owned by Tenet Healthcare.

Citing reduced revenue streams, Tenet Healthcare closed North Hollywood Medical Center in August 1998.

== Filming location of Scrubs ==
The building was the filming location of the NBC/ABC sitcom Scrubs for the first eight seasons (2001 through 2009) of the show, where it was called Sacred Heart Hospital.

The building required extensive reconstruction before it could be used as the Scrubs location. The reconstruction included production offices and dressing rooms on the third floor.

The series' lead actor, Zach Braff, commented on DVD audio commentary that the hospital still received patients in the lobby asking for medical advice, believing the hospital was still running due to the ambulances parked as props outside. On another DVD commentary, Sarah Chalke recalled having a man and his wife show up looking for medical help. She remembered that the man's arm was bloody and there was nothing anybody could do except direct the couple to a real hospital.

Season 9 was set in a new medical school facility, for which a stage set at Culver Studios was used. In the show, Sacred Heart Hospital was said to have been torn down and re-built on the "Winston University" campus.

The 2026 revival of Scrubs recreated the premises faithfully, this time in a warehouse in Vancouver.

== Other roles in film and television ==
Other than being used in Scrubs, the building was featured repeatedly as the hospital in the 2001 film The One, starring Jet Li. The center was used to film an advertisement for Communities In Schools. It also served as the filming location of the hospital-drama Diagnosis X, which featured doctors acting out their most unusual cases.

The hospital has also been used in the following:

- The Sessions
- Charmed
- Childrens Hospital
- Chuck
- Crossroads
- Eli Stone
- The Forgotten
- The Office
- Parenthood
- Three Rivers
- Worst Week
- United States of Tara
- Death Valley
- Six Feet Under
- Freaks and Geeks
- Malcolm in the Middle
- The Craigslist Killer
- Gilmore Girls

== Demolition ==
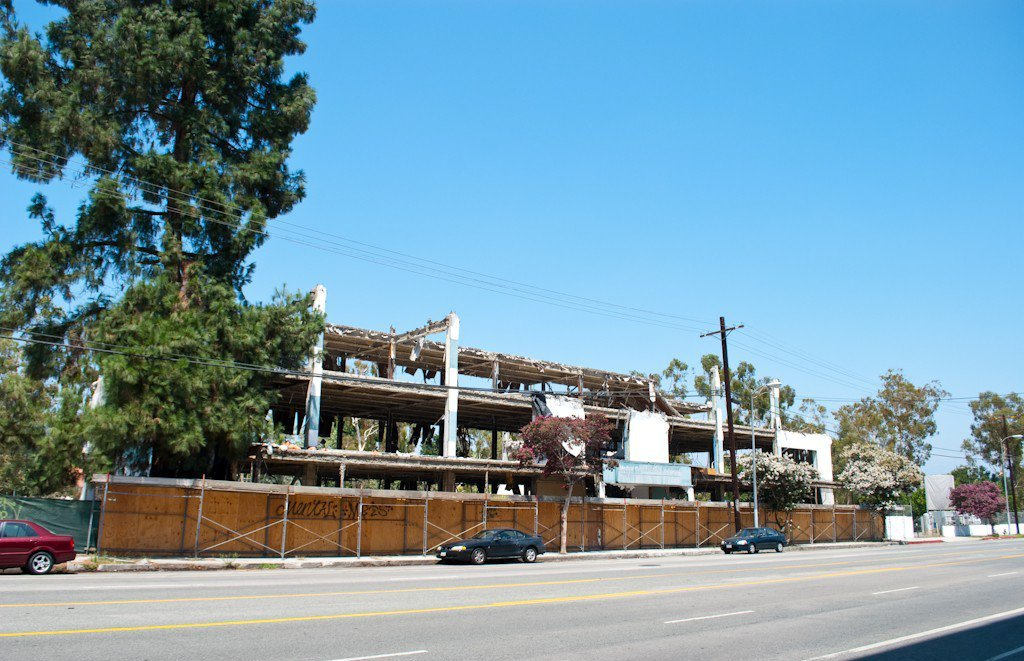
Demolition of the North Hollywood Medical Center in 2011.

The building was scheduled to be demolished in 2011. On July 19, 2011, a fire was reported during the demolition of the building and quickly extinguished by the Los Angeles fire department. Welders removing part of the roof inadvertently dropped hot steel scraps down an elevator shaft, where debris caught fire. According to fire officials, there were no injuries, and no monetary loss as the building was already under demolition.
