= Seth Green =

American actor and producer (born 1974)

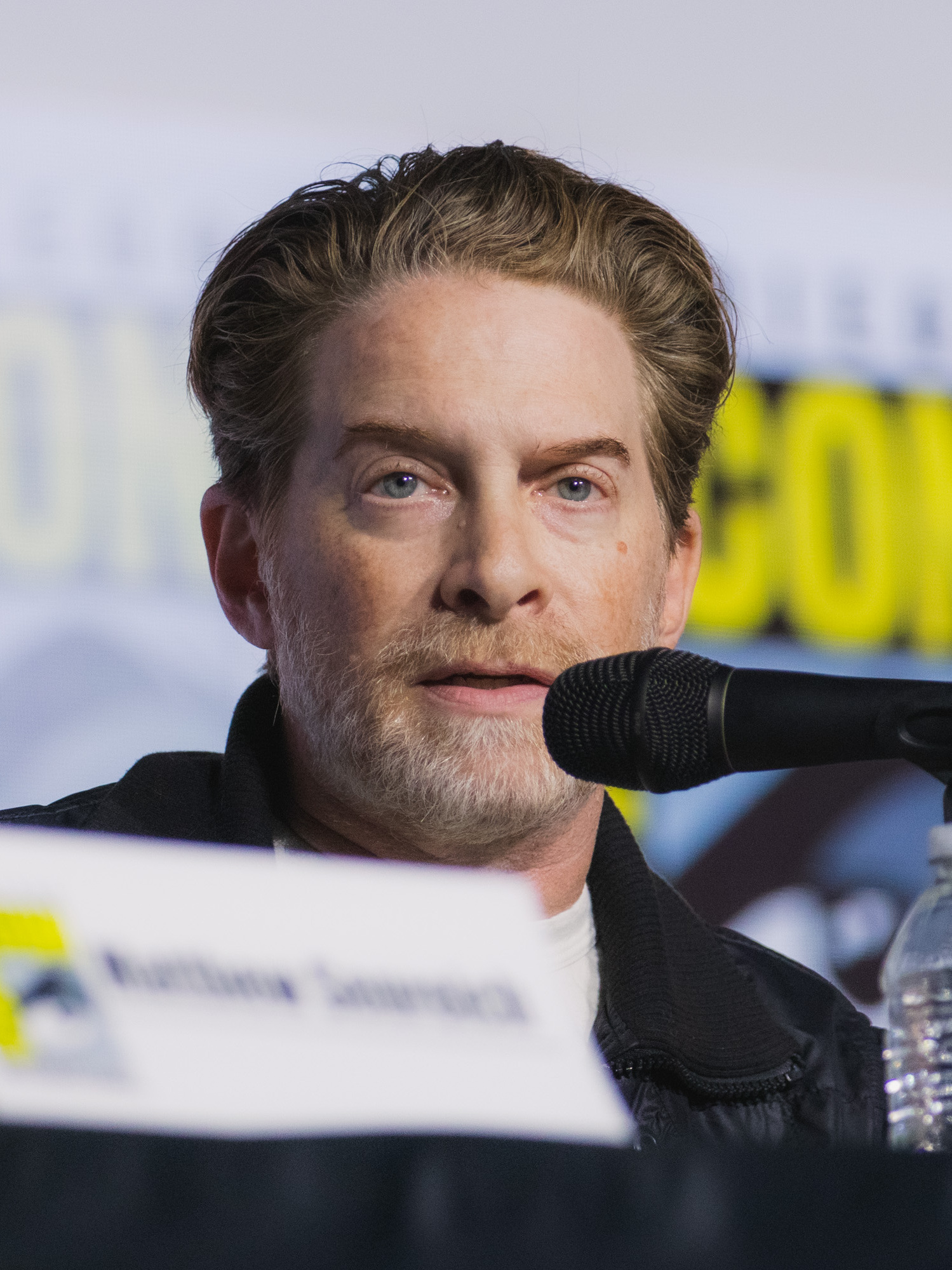
- Green at the 2026 San Diego Comic-Con
- Born: Seth Benjamin Gesshel-Green; February 8, 1974 (age 52); Philadelphia, Pennsylvania, U.S.
- Occupations: Actor; screenwriter; director; producer
- Years active: 1983–present
- Spouse: Clare Grant (m. 2010)
- Children: 1
- Website: sethgreen.com

Seth Benjamin Green (né Gesshel-Green; born February 8, 1974) is an American actor and producer. His film debut was The Hotel New Hampshire (1984), and he went on to have supporting roles in comedy films in the 1980s, including Radio Days, Can't Buy Me Love (both 1987) and Big Business (1988).

In the 1990s and 2000s, Green starred in comedy films such as Idle Hands (1999), Rat Race (2001), Without a Paddle (2004) and Be Cool (2005). He became known for his portrayal of Scott Evil, Dr. Evil's son, in the Austin Powers film series (1997–2002). Green has taken non-comedic roles in films, including The Attic Expeditions (2001) and Party Monster (2003). He has provided the voice for Howard the Duck in a number of Marvel Cinematic Universe films and series, including Guardians of the Galaxy (2014), Guardians of the Galaxy Vol. 2 (2017), and Guardians of the Galaxy Vol. 3 (2023) and in the animated series What If...? (2021–2024). In 2019, he wrote, directed, and starred in the comedy-drama film Changeland.

Green's first lead roles on television were Richie Toizer in the television miniseries It, and the ABC sitcom Good & Evil in 1991, for which he won a Young Artist Award. Green later gained attention for his supporting roles as Oz, a teenage guitarist and the boyfriend of Willow Rosenberg, on the fantasy television series Buffy the Vampire Slayer (1997–2000), and as the voice of Chris Griffin on the Fox adult animated comedy series Family Guy (1999–present).

He voiced Monty Monogram in the Disney Channel/Disney+ animated series Phineas and Ferb (2011–2015; 2025–present), Leonardo in the Nickelodeon animated series Teenage Mutant Ninja Turtles (2014–2017) and Joker in the Mass Effect video game series (2007–2012). Green created, directed, wrote, and produced the adult animated comedy series Robot Chicken and its spinoffs (2005–present), which have earned him three Primetime Emmy Awards and five Annie Awards.

== Early life ==
Seth Benjamin Gesshel-Green was born in Overbrook Park, Philadelphia, Pennsylvania, the son of Barbara (née Gesshel) and Herbert Green. He has one sister, Kaela. Green later legally changed his name to Seth Benjamin Green. He was raised Jewish and had a bar mitzvah ceremony.

His ancestors were from Russia, Poland, and Scotland. Green started acting at the age of 7. His early comic influences included Monty Python, Blackadder, Saturday Night Live, Richard Pryor, Bill Cosby, Porky's, and Caddyshack.

== Career ==
=== Early work ===
Green's first film roles were in the 1984 films Billions for Boris and The Hotel New Hampshire; the second film cast him alongside Jodie Foster and Rob Lowe. He appeared in the 1987 film Can't Buy Me Love, playing Patrick Dempsey's character's little brother, Chuckie Miller. He starred in Woody Allen's Radio Days (1987) as Joe (a 1930s–1940s boy based on Allen) and appeared in Big Business (1988) and, in the same year, My Stepmother Is an Alien, which also starred Buffy the Vampire Slayer co-star Alyson Hannigan. In 1987, he played Danny in Chris Elliott's "Cinemax Comedy Experiment" anthology series episode, Action Family.

In 1984, Green portrayed Carl "Alfalfa" Switzer in the Jell-O Gelatin Pops commercials featuring The Little Rascals. In 1991, Green rose to fame in a Rally's "Cha Ching" commercial, which earned him an appearance at a New Orleans Saints game. Green was given a key to New Orleans in honor of his role in the popular commercial.

Green appeared in the horror TV series It (as Richie Tozier, age 12) and Ticks, all three Austin Powers films (as Dr. Evil's son, Scott), and Enemy of the State and The Italian Job (as a computer specialist in both). He was also in the films Can't Hardly Wait, Rat Race, Scooby-Doo 2: Monsters Unleashed, Without a Paddle (alongside Matthew Lillard), Idle Hands, Party Monster, Airborne, and Old Dogs.

In 1994, he starred alongside Jennifer Love Hewitt in the short-lived series The Byrds of Paradise. The two additionally appeared in 1998's Can't Hardly Wait. Green also had a role in the series Buffy the Vampire Slayer. He played Daniel "Oz" Osbourne, a calm, mild-mannered member of the band Dingoes Ate My Baby who gets turned into a werewolf. The character was very popular among fans of the series. Green is not related to Bruce Seth Green, who directed some episodes of Buffy the Vampire Slayer. On occasion, some sources confuse the two and have credited Seth as the director. As an actor in the series, he was close to co-star Alyson Hannigan because they were lovers in the show. Green has starred on Fox's Greg the Bunny and guest-starred on The X-Files, That '70s Show, Will & Grace, MADtv, Reno 911!, Entourage, Grey's Anatomy, The Wonder Years, Heroes, The Facts of Life, The Drew Carey Show, and My Name Is Earl.

=== Family Guy ===
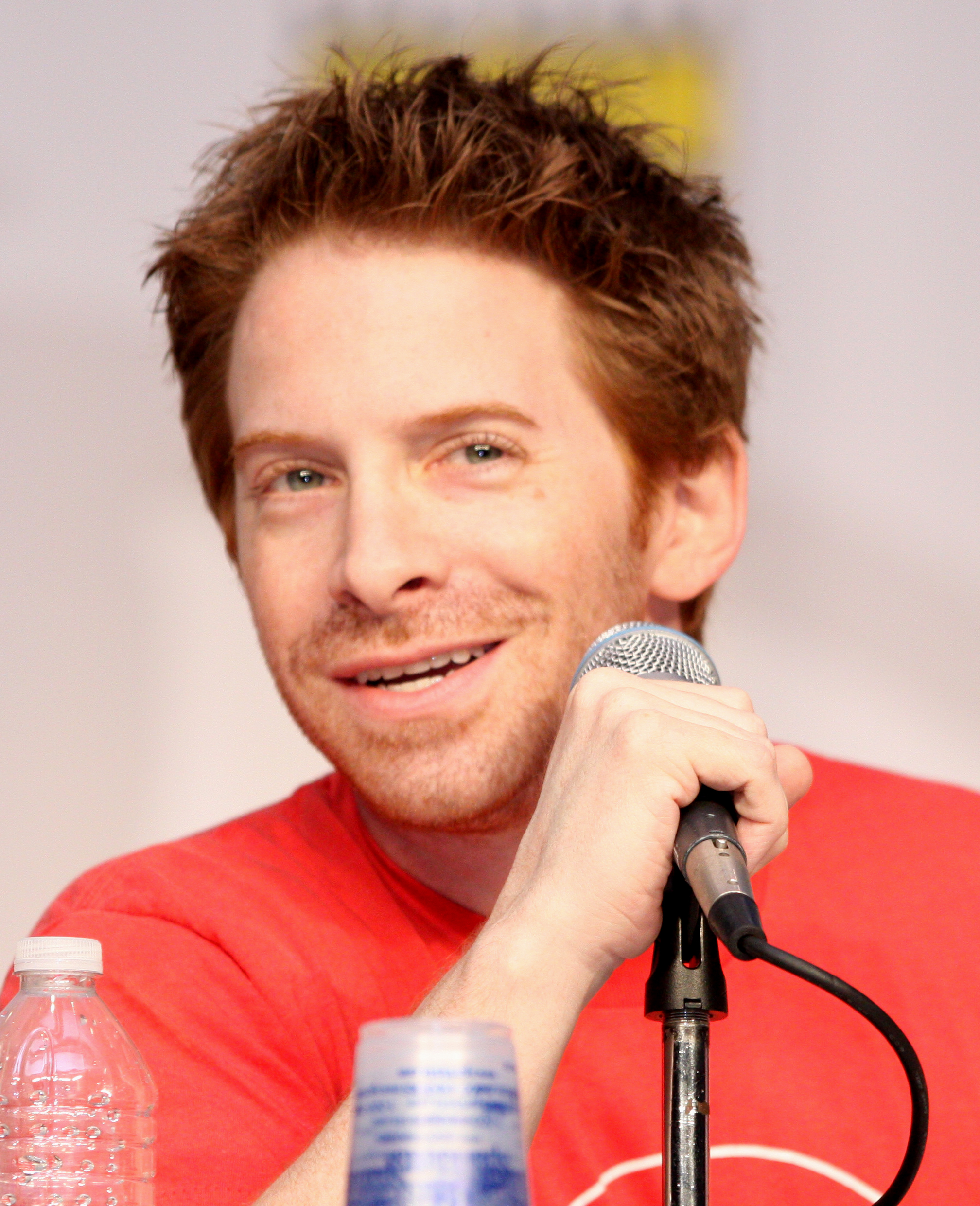
Green at the 2010 San Diego Comic-Con for Family Guy

On the animated television comedy Family Guy, Green primarily voices Chris Griffin, the teenage son, who is overweight, unintelligent and, in many respects, a younger version of his father Peter Griffin. He also voices Neil Goldman, a neighbor of the Griffins. Green did an impression of Buffalo Bill from the thriller film The Silence of the Lambs during his audition. He has stated that his main inspiration for Chris' voice came from envisioning how Buffalo Bill would sound when speaking through a public address system at a McDonald's.

=== Howard the Duck ===
Green provides the voice of Howard the Duck for the live-action Marvel Cinematic Universe (MCU) films Guardians of the Galaxy (2014) and Vol. 2 (2017) and the Disney+ animated series What If...?, as well as the Disney XD animated series Guardians of the Galaxy (2015–2019) and Ultimate Spider-Man (2016).

Developing the character with James Gunn, Green did an impression of Danny DeVito, "being sort of a gruff and cynical sarcastic character [who] doesn't know what the Earth species of duck even is and doesn't think of himself that way and is offended by that generalization."

=== Later work ===
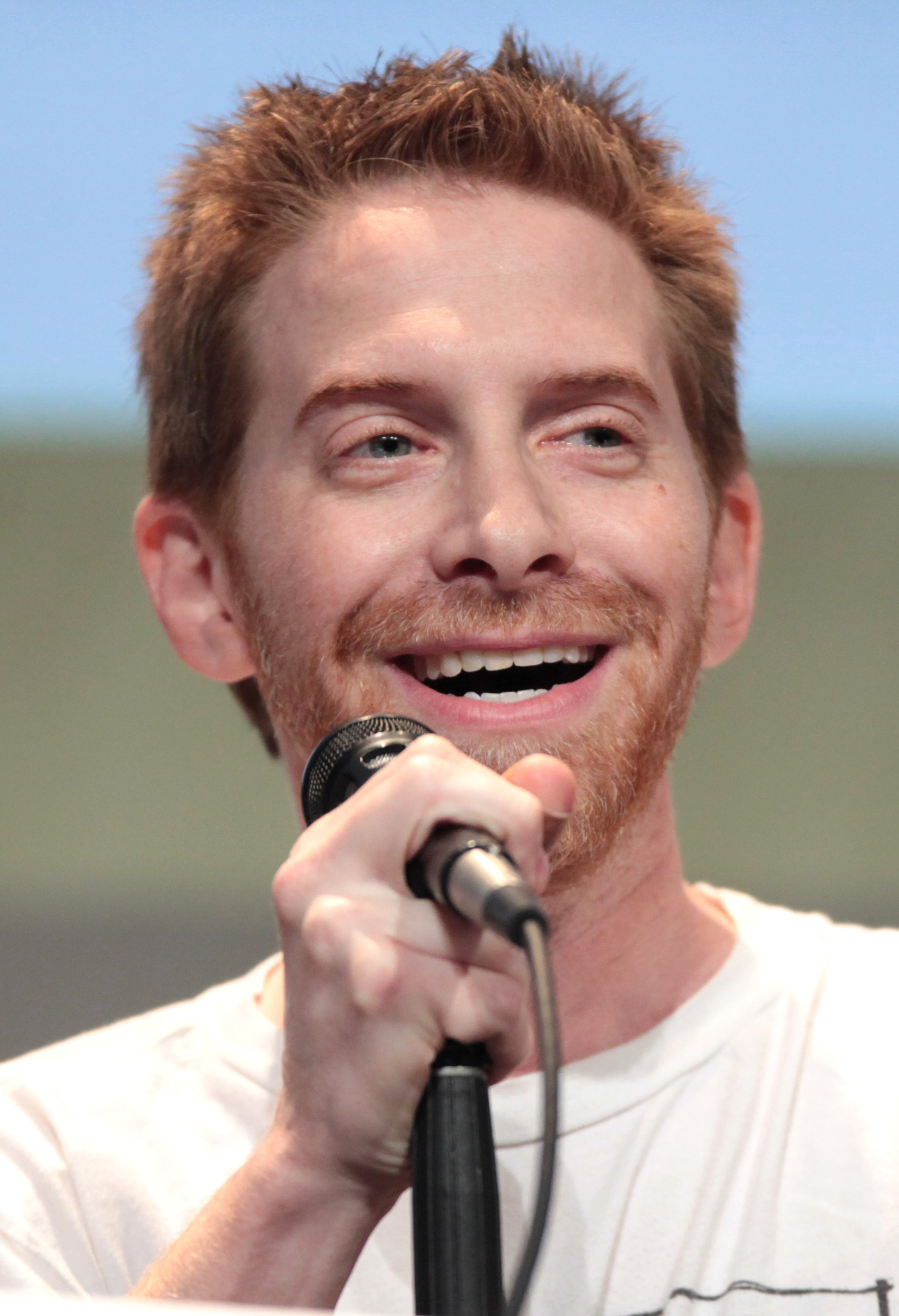
Green at the 2015 San Diego Comic-Con

Green is a co-creator, co-producer, writer, director, and most frequent voice of the Emmy-winning stop-motion sketch parody comedy TV series Robot Chicken, for which he does many voices and has appeared in animated form. Green is friends with the band Fall Out Boy, making a cameo in their music video, "This Ain't a Scene, It's an Arms Race". He also appeared in "Weird Al" Yankovic's "White & Nerdy" music video. He made two appearances on The Soup in 2007 and 2008, using his first appearance to lampoon Internet celebrity Chris Crocker.

He voiced the character Jeff "Joker" Moreau, pilot of the Normandy-SR starship series in the video games Mass Effect, Mass Effect 2, and Mass Effect 3. He is a producer of The 1 Second Film and appears in the "making of" documentary that accompanies its feature-length credits. Green is also the co-creator (with Hugh Sterbakov) of the comic Freshmen, published by Top Cow Productions.

Green and Robot Chicken co-producer Breckin Meyer appeared in the NBC show Heroes during the 2008–09 season. In January 2009, Green worked with David Faustino (Bud Bundy from Married... with Children) for an episode of Faustino's show Star-ving – Faustino is often mistaken for Green. Later in the same year, he worked with one of his idols, Robin Williams, in the comedy film Old Dogs, which also starred John Travolta. On July 13, World Wrestling Entertainment's official website announced Green as the special guest host for the July 13 episode of WWE Raw, and on that night, Green competed in the main event, a six-man tag team match, which his team won by disqualification.

He was in attendance for WWE's biggest event of the year, WrestleMania XXVI on March 28, 2010. In 2011, Green provided the voice of Monty Monogram in the Disney Channel animated series Phineas and Ferb. Green guest-starred in the third season of the acclaimed sitcom Husbands. Green became the new voice of Leonardo in Teenage Mutant Ninja Turtles following Jason Biggs' departure from the role.

In 2019, he wrote and directed his first film, Changeland, starring Brenda Song and Macaulay Culkin. The film was released on June 7, 2019.

In 2020, Green reprised his voice role as Monty Monogram in the Disney+ exclusive original film, Phineas and Ferb the Movie: Candace Against the Universe, the second overall Phineas and Ferb film, released on August 28, 2020.

In 2021, Green reprised the role of Todo 360 in Star Wars: The Bad Batch. The following year, Green voiced Thunderbolt in the third season of Stargirl, replacing Jim Gaffigan.

== Personal life ==
After getting engaged on New Year's Eve in 2009, Green married actress Clare Grant on May 1, 2010, in Northern California. They worked together on Robot Chicken, Warren the Ape, Changeland, Holidays, Star Wars: The Clone Wars, Hulk and the Agents of S.M.A.S.H., and her Saber and "Geek and Gamer Girls Song" viral videos. Green revealed in October 2025 that he and Grant have a two-year-old child together.

In October 2022, Green accused Bill Murray of forcibly dropping him in a trash bin backstage on Saturday Night Live when he was nine years old. He claimed that the assault occurred after Murray was frustrated that Green refused to move from the armrest of a couch.

== Filmography ==
=== Film ===
Year	Title	Role	Notes
1984	Billions for Boris	Benjamin "Ape-Face" Andrews	
1984	The Hotel New Hampshire	"Egg" Berry	
1986	Willy/Milly	Malcolm	
1987	Radio Days	Joe	
1987	Can't Buy Me Love	Chuckie Miller	
1988	Big Business	Jason	
1988	My Stepmother Is an Alien	Fred Glass	
1990	Missing Parents	Leo	
1990	Pump Up the Volume	Joey	
1991	Our Shining Moment	Wheels	
1992	The Double 0 Kid	Chip	
1992	Buffy the Vampire Slayer	Vampire	
1993	Ticks	Tyler Burns	
1993	Arcade	Stilts	
1993	Airborne	Wiley	
1993	The Day My Parents Ran Away	Leo	
1995	Notes from Underground	Punk Neighbor	
1995	White Man's Burden	3rd Youth at Hot Dog Stand	
1996	To Gillian on Her 37th Birthday	Danny Green	
1997	Boys Life 2	Homophobe #2	Segment: "Nunzio's Second Cousin"
1997	Austin Powers: International Man of Mystery	Scott Evil	
1998	Can't Hardly Wait	Kenny Fisher	
1998	Enemy of the State	Selby	Uncredited
1999	Idle Hands	Mick	
1999	Stonebrook	Cornelius	
1999	Austin Powers: The Spy Who Shagged Me	Scott Evil	
2001	Rock Star 101	Le'Von	Short film
2001	The Trumpet of the Swan	Boyd (voice)	
2001	The Attic Expeditions	Douglas	
2001	Josie and the Pussycats	Travis	
2001	America's Sweethearts	Danny Wax	
2001	Rat Race	Duane Cody	
2001	Knockaround Guys	Johnny Marbles	
2002	Austin Powers in Goldmember	Scott Evil	
2003	Party Monster	James St. James	
2003	The Italian Job	Lyle / "Napster"	
2004	Scooby-Doo 2: Monsters Unleashed	Patrick Wisely	
2004	Without a Paddle	Dan Mott	
2005	Be Cool	Shotgun	Uncredited
2005	Stewie Griffin: The Untold Story	Chris Griffin, various (voices)	Direct-to-video
2005	The Best Man	Murray	
2006	Electric Apricot: Quest for Festeroo	Jonah "the Taper Guy"	
2006	The TV Set	Slut Wars Host	
2008	Sex Drive	Ezekiel	
2009	Old Dogs	Craig White	
2010	Iron Man 2	Expo Fan	Cameo
2011	Mars Needs Moms	Milo	Motion capture only, was also the original voice of Milo during production, voice-over work cut.
2011	The Story of Luke	Zack	
2013	Sexy Evil Genius	Zachary Newman	
2013	Dear Mr. Watterson	Himself	Documentary
2013	I Know That Voice	Himself	Documentary
2014	Guardians of the Galaxy	Howard the Duck (voice)	Uncredited cameo
2014	The Identical	Dino	
2014	Yellowbird	Yellowbird (voice)	
2015	Wrestling Isn't Wrestling	DX Fan	Short film
2015	Krampus	Lumpy (voice)	
2016	Holidays	Pete Gunderson	
2017	The Lego Batman Movie	King Kong (voice)	
2017	Guardians of the Galaxy Vol. 2	Howard the Duck (voice)	
2018	A Futile and Stupid Gesture	Christopher Guest	
2018	Dear Dictator	Dr. Charles Seaver	
2019	Shazam!	Friend	Uncredited
2019	Godzilla: King of the Monsters	Fighter Pilot	Uncredited
2019	Changeland	Brandon	Also writer and director
2020	aTypical Wednesday	Patrick	
2020	Phineas and Ferb the Movie: Candace Against the Universe	Monty Monogram (voice)	
2021	Black Friday	Dour Dennis (voice)	
2021	Pennywise: The Story of It	Himself	Documentary film
2022	Weird: The Al Yankovic Story	Radio DJ	
2023	Guardians of the Galaxy Vol. 3	Howard the Duck (voice)	
2023	Hanky Panky	Harry the Hat	
2024	Junk	David	
2026	The Highest Stakes	Samuel Nicholas	

=== Television ===
Year	Title	Role	Notes
1984	Young People's Specials	Charlie	Episode: "Charlie's Christmas Secret"
1985	ABC Afterschool Special	Tommy Sanders	Episode: "I Want to Go Home"
1985	Tales from the Darkside	Timmy	Episode: "Monsters in My Room"
1986	Amazing Stories	Lance	Episode: "The Sitter"
1986	Spenser: For Hire	Andy Chandler	Episode: "The Hopes and Fears"
1987	The Comic Strip	Normal human twin siblings Sherman	Miniseries
1987	Action Family	Danny	
1988	The Facts of Life	Adam Brinkerhoff	2 episodes
1989	Free Spirit	Joey	Episode: "Too Much of a Good Thing"
1989	Mr. Belvedere	Louis	2 episodes
1990	Life Goes On	William Butler	2 episodes
1990	It	Young Richie Tozier	2 episodes
1991	Good & Evil	David	6 episodes
1992	Evening Shade	Larry Phipps	Episode: "Hasta la Vista"
1992	The Wonder Years	Jimmy Donnelly	2 episodes
1992	Batman: The Animated Series	Wizard (voice)	Episode: "I Am the Night"
1993	Beverly Hills, 90210	Wayne	Episode: "The Game Is Chicken"
1993	The X-Files	Emil	Episode: "Deep Throat"
1993	seaQuest DSV	Nick "Wolfman"	Episode: "Photon Bullet"
1994	The Byrds of Paradise	Harry Byrd	8 episodes
1994	Weird Science	Lubec	Episode: "Lisa's Virus"
1995	Haunted Lives: True Ghost Stories	Termite	Miniseries
1995	Step by Step	Danny	Episode: "Head of the Class"
1996	Something So Right	Napoleon	Episode: "Pilot"
1997	Pearl	Bob	Episode: "Mission ImPearlsible"
1997	Mad About You	Bobby Rubenfeld	Episode: "Guardianhood"
1997	The Drew Carey Show	The MC	Episode: "That Thing You Don't"
1997	Temporarily Yours	David Silver	6 episodes
1997–2000	Buffy the Vampire Slayer	Daniel "Oz" Osbourne	Main role
1998	Cybill	Jaybo	Episode: "Cybill Sheridan's Day Off"
1999–present	Family Guy	Chris Griffin, Various voices	Main role
1999	Angel	Daniel "Oz" Osbourne	Episode: "In the Dark"
1999	Saturday Night Live	Himself	Episode: "Sarah Michelle Gellar/Backstreet Boys"
1999–2000	Batman Beyond	Nelson Nash, Dempsey (voices)	8 episodes
1999–2000	100 Deeds for Eddie McDowd	Eddie McDowd (voice)	Main role
2000–2005	MADtv	Brightling	4 episodes
2000	Tucker	Himself	3 episodes
2002	Greg the Bunny	Jimmy Bender	Main role
2002	Whatever Happened to Robot Jones?	Various voices	4 episodes
2003–2004	That '70s Show	Mitch Miller	5 episodes
2003	Aqua Teen Hunger Force	Himself (voice)	Episode: "The Dressing"
2003	Punk'd	Himself	1 episode
2004	Married to the Kellys	Dr. Jim Coglan	Episode: "A Portrait of Susan"
2004	Johnny Bravo	Himself (voice)	Episode: "Johnny Makeover"
2004	Sesame Street	Vinny	2 episodes
2004; 2007	Crank Yankers	Travis, Russel, and Taylor (voice)	3 episodes
2005	Will & Grace	Randall Finn	Episode: "Friends with Benefits"
2005–2016	American Dad!	Matthew McConaughey, Various voices	4 episodes
2005–2025	Robot Chicken	Robot Chicken, Cluckerella, Nerd, Daniel/Gyro-Robo, Various voices	Also co-creator, director, writer and executive producer
2006	Four Kings	Barry	13 episodes
2006	Ned's Declassified School Survival Guide	Dog (voice)	Episode: "Guide to April Fool's Day"
2006	The Secret Policeman's Ball	Private Parts, Mt. Pink	Television special
2006	The Andy Milonakis Show	Himself	Season 2, Episodes 6
2006–2008	Entourage	Himself	3 episodes
2007	Grey's Anatomy	Nick	2 episodes
2008	Reno 911!	Rick the Manager	Episode: "Undercover at Burger Cousin"
2008	My Name Is Earl	Buddy	Episode: "The Magic Hour"
2008	Heroes	Sam	2 episodes
2009; 2014	WWE Raw	Host	Television special
2009–2010	Star Wars: The Clone Wars	Todo 360, Ion Papanoida (voices)	4 episodes
2009	Titan Maximum	Lt. Gibbs, Various voices	Main role; also executive producer
2009	The Cleveland Show	Chris Griffin (voice)	2 episodes
2009	The Venture Bros.	Lance Hale, Mrs. Z (voice)	Episode: "Self-Medication"
2009	His Name Was Jason: 30 Years of Friday the 13th	Himself	Documentary
2010	Warren The Ape	Himself	Episode: "Amends"
2011–2013	MAD	Various voices	3 episodes
2011	Delete	Lucifer	2 episodes
2012–2015; 2025	Phineas and Ferb	Monty Monogram (voice)	Recurring role
2012	Franklin & Bash	Jango	Episode: "Jango and Rossi"
2012	Dan Vs.	Ahkenrah (voice)	Episode: "The Mummy"
2012	How I Met Your Mother	Daryl LaCorte	Episode: "The Final Page"
2012	Comedy Central Roast of Roseanne Barr	Roaster	Television special
2012–2013	Holliston	Gustavo	2 episodes
2013	Conan	Conan O'Brien	Episode: "Occupy Conan: When Outsourcing Goes Too Far"
2013	Men at Work	Homeless Guy	Episode: "Will Work for Milo"
2013	Husbands	The Officiant	Episode: "I Do Over"
2013–2014	Dads	Eli Sachs	Main role
2013–2015	Hulk and the Agents of S.M.A.S.H.	Rick Jones / A-Bomb, Rocket Raccoon (voices)	Main role
2014	Avengers Assemble	Rocket Raccoon (voice)	Episode: "Guardians and Space Knights"
2014–2017	Teenage Mutant Ninja Turtles	Leonardo, various voices	Main role (seasons 3–5)
2015	Community	Scrunch	Episode: "Emotional Consequences of Broadcast Television"
2016	Ice Age: The Great Egg-Scapade	Squint (voice)	Special
2016	Castle	Linus (voice)	Uncredited; 2 episodes
2016	Broad City	Jared	2 episodes
2016	The Loud House	Loki Loud (voice)	Episode: "One of the Boys"
2016	Mary + Jane	Toby	Episode: "Neighborhood Watch"
2016	Ultimate Spider-Man	Rick Jones, Howard the Duck (voice)	Episode: "Return to the Spider-Verse"
2017	Crazy Ex-Girlfriend	Patrick	Episode: "Is Josh Free in Two Weeks?"
2017	Buddy Thunderstruck	—N/a	Executive producer
2017	Star Wars Rebels	Captain Seevor (voice)	Episode: "Crawler Commanders"
2017; 2022	The Simpsons	Robot Chicken Nerd, Mav Redfield (voice)	2 episodes
2018	Guardians of the Galaxy	Howard the Duck (voice)	6 episodes
2018	Bobcat Goldthwait's Misfits & Monsters	Noble Bartell	Episode: "Bubba the Bear"
2018	12 oz. Mouse	Mouse "Fitz" Fitzgerald (voice)	Episode: "Invictus"; Credited as Baron Victor Von Hamburger III
2019	Historical Roasts	David Bowie	Episode: "Freddie Mercury"
2020	The Rookie	Jordan Neil	Episode: "Hand-Off"
2020	Rise of the Teenage Mutant Ninja Turtles	Loathsome Leonard (voice)	Episode: "Raph's Ride-Along"
2020–2021	Crossing Swords	Blinkerquartz (voice)	18 episodes
2021	Punky Brewster	Evan	Episode: "Two First Dates"
2021–2024	Star Wars: The Bad Batch	Todo 360 (voice)	3 episodes
2021–2024	What If...?	Howard the Duck (voice)	5 episodes
2022	Love, Death & Robots	Private Folen (voice)	Episode: "Kill Team Kill"
2022	Stargirl	Thunderbolt (voice)	Recurring role
2024	That '90s Show	Mitch Miller	2 episodes
2024–2025	Hamster & Gretel	Footkicker (voice)	4 episodes
2025	Celebrity Jeopardy!	Himself (contestant)	Episode: "Quarterfinal #3: Rachel Brosnahan, Seth Green and Margaret Cho"
2025	The Conners	Chad	3 episodes

=== Web ===
Year	Title	Role	Notes
2008–2009	Seth MacFarlane's Cavalcade of Cartoon Comedy	Various voices	5 episodes
2010	Team Unicorn: G33K & G4M3R Girls	Himself	
2012	Saber 2: The Body Wash Strikes Back	—N/a	Director
2014–2015	TableTop	Himself	2 episodes
2015	Con Man	Casey	Episode: "Thank You for Your Service"
2015	Wrestling Isn't Wrestling	D-X Fan	Cameo
2015–2016	SuperMansion	Various voices	Also executive producer
2016–2018	Camp WWE	—N/a	Producer
2022	Good Mythical Morning	Himself	Guest on episode "Tell the Truth or Eat the Nasty Food Challenge"

=== Video games ===
Year	Title	Role	Notes
1992	Make My Video	Band Member	
1994	Playtoons	Sneetches, Peter T. Hooper, Crowd #1	Storylines: "Uncle Archibald" and "The Secret of the Castle"
1994	Storybook Weaver	Various	
2004	Storybook Weaver Deluxe	Various	
2006	Family Guy Video Game!	Chris Griffin	
2007	Mass Effect	Jeff "Joker" Moreau	
2010	Mass Effect 2	Jeff "Joker" Moreau	
2012	Mass Effect 3	Jeff "Joker" Moreau	
2012	Family Guy: Back to the Multiverse	Chris Griffin	
2014	Family Guy: The Quest for Stuff	Chris Griffin, Neil Goldman	
2014	Watch Dogs	Bobby Ames	
2016	Call of Duty: Infinite Warfare	Poindexter Zittermann	
2016	Teenage Mutant Ninja Turtles: Portal Power	Leonardo	
2022	Warped Kart Racers	Chris Griffin	Archival Recording
2024	Teenage Mutant Ninja Turtles: Wrath of the Mutants	Leonardo	
2025	Nicktoons & The Dice of Destiny	Leonardo	

=== Theme park attractions ===
Year	Title	Role	Venue	Notes
2017	Guardians of the Galaxy – Mission Breakout!	Howard the Duck (voice)	Disney California Adventure	

== Awards and nominations ==
Year	Association	Category	Work	Result
1989	Young Artist Awards	Best Young Actor Guest-Starring in a Syndicated Family Comedy, Drama, or Special	The Facts of Life	Nominated
1992	Young Artist Awards	Outstanding Young Comedian in a Television Series	Good & Evil	Won
2000	Teen Choice Awards	TV – Choice Actor	Buffy the Vampire Slayer	Nominated
2002	Teen Choice Awards	TV – Choice Actor, Comedy	Greg the Bunny	Nominated
2005	Teen Choice Awards	Choice Movie Dance Scene	Be Cool	Nominated
2006	Spike Video Game Awards	Best Supporting Male Performance	Family Guy Video Game!	Nominated
2006	Spike Video Game Awards	Best Cast	Family Guy Video Game!	Won
2007	Primetime Emmy Awards	Outstanding Animated Program	Robot Chicken, episode: "Lust for Puppets"	Nominated
2008	Annie Awards	Best Animated Television Production	Robot Chicken: Star Wars	Nominated
2008	Annie Awards	Best Directing in an Animated Television Production	Robot Chicken: Star Wars	Won
2008	Primetime Emmy Awards	Outstanding Animated Program	Robot Chicken: Star Wars	Nominated
2009	Annie Award	Best Animated Television Production	Robot Chicken: Star Wars Episode II	Won
2009	Annie Award	Best Writing in an Animated Television Production or Short Form	Robot Chicken: Star Wars Episode II	Won
2009	Slammy Awards	Raw Guest Host of the Year	WWE Raw	Nominated
2009	Primetime Emmy Awards	Outstanding Animated Program	Robot Chicken: Star Wars Episode II	Nominated
2009	Primetime Emmy Awards	Outstanding Voice-Over Performance	Robot Chicken: Star Wars Episode II	Nominated
2010	Primetime Emmy Awards	Outstanding Short Form Animated Program	Robot Chicken, episode: "Full-Assed Christmas Special" ("Dear Consumer")	Won
2010	Primetime Emmy Awards	Outstanding Voice-Over Performance	Robot Chicken	Nominated
2011	Annie Awards	Best Writing in a Television Production	Robot Chicken: Star Wars Episode III	Won
2011	Primetime Emmy Awards	Outstanding Animated Program	Robot Chicken: Star Wars Episode III	Nominated
2011	Primetime Emmy Awards	Outstanding Short Form Animated Program	Robot Chicken, episode: "Robot Chicken's DP Christmas Special"	Nominated
2011	Primetime Emmy Awards	Outstanding Voice-Over Performance	Robot Chicken	Nominated
2012	Teen Choice Awards	Choice Animated Series	Robot Chicken	Nominated
2012	Primetime Emmy Awards	Outstanding Short Form Animated Program	Robot Chicken, episode: "Fight Club Paradise"	Nominated
2013	Annie Awards	Best General Audience Animated Television Production	Robot Chicken DC Comics Special	Won
2013	Primetime Emmy Awards	Outstanding Short Form Animated Program	Robot Chicken, episode: "Robot Chicken's ATM Christmas Special"	Nominated
2013	Primetime Emmy Awards	Outstanding Voice-Over Performance	Robot Chicken	Nominated
2014	Primetime Emmy Awards	Outstanding Short Form Animated Program	Robot Chicken, episode: "Born Again Virgin Christmas Special"	Nominated
2014	Primetime Emmy Awards	Outstanding Character Voice-Over Performance	Robot Chicken DC Comics Special 2: Villains in Paradise	Nominated
2015	Annie Awards	Outstanding Achievement, Voice Acting in an Animated TV/Broadcast Production	Robot Chicken	Nominated
2015	Primetime Emmy Awards	Outstanding Character Voice-Over Performance	Robot Chicken	Nominated
2015	Primetime Emmy Awards	Outstanding Short Form Animated Program	Robot Chicken, episode: "Chipotle Miserable"	Nominated
2016	Primetime Emmy Awards	Outstanding Short Form Animated Program	Robot Chicken, episode: "Robot Chicken Christmas Special: The X-Mas United"	Won
2018	Primetime Emmy Awards	Outstanding Short Form Animated Program	Robot Chicken, episode: "Freshly Baked: The Robot Chicken Santa Claus Pot Cookie Freakout Special: Special Edition"	Won
2019	Primetime Emmy Awards	Outstanding Short Form Animated Program	Robot Chicken, episode: "Why Is It Wet?"	Nominated
2020	Primetime Emmy Awards	Outstanding Short Form Animated Program	Robot Chicken, episode: "Santa's Dead (Spoiler Alert) Holiday Murder Thing Special"	Nominated
2021	Primetime Emmy Awards	Outstanding Short Form Animated Program	Robot Chicken, episode: "Endgame"	Nominated
2022	Primetime Emmy Awards	Outstanding Short Form Animated Program	Robot Chicken, episode: "Happy Russian Deathdog Dolloween 2 U"	Nominated

== See also ==
- List of Buffy the Vampire Slayer characters
- List of Heroes cast members
- List of Phineas and Ferb guest stars
- List of recurring That '70s Show characters
