= DC Universe All Star Games =

Roleplaying web series

- Genre: Tabletop; Roleplaying; Superheroes; Comics; Unscripted
- Language: American English

Cast and voices
- Starring: Sam Witwer; Vanessa Marshall; Clare Grant; Freddie Prinze Jr.; Xavier Woods

Publication
- No. of seasons: 1
- No. of episodes: 6
- Original release: February 28 – March 27, 2020
- Provider: DC Comics

DC Universe All Star Games is an unscripted gaming television series that premiered on the DC Universe streaming service on February 28, 2020. Created by Freddie Prinze Jr. and Sam Witwer, its 6 episodes feature Prinze, Witwer, Vanessa Marshall, Clare Grant, and Xavier Woods playing the '80s role-playing game DC Heroes in a campaign reminiscent of the film The Breakfast Club. The series was directed by Jon Lee Brody.
