= Romina =

Romina is a feminine given name of Italian origin. Notable people with the name include:

- Romina Arena (born 1980), Italian–American singer-songwriter
- Romina Armellini (born 1984), Italian swimmer
- Romina Basso, Italian opera singer
- Romina Bell, Austrian footballer
- Romina Belluscio (born 1979), Argentine TV presenter
- Romina Contiero (born 1983), Italian singer and dancer
- Romina Daniele (born 1980), Italian singer and composer
- Romina Falconi (born 1985), Italian singer and songwriter
- Romina Ferro (born 1980), Argentine footballer
- Romina Goldszmid, Argentine-American biologist
- Romina Holz (born 1988), German footballer
- Romina Johnson (born 1973), London-based Italian–American singer
- Romina Lanaro (born 1986), Argentine model
- Romina Laurito (born 1987), Italian rhythmic gymnast
- Romina de Novellis (born 1982), Italian performance artist
- Romina Oprandi (born 1986), Swiss–Italian tennis player
- Romina Plataroti (born 1979), Argentine gymnast
- Romina Plonsker (born 1988), German politician
- Romina Pourmokhtari (born 1995), Swedish politician
- Romina Power (born 1951), American-Italian actress and singer
- Romina Stefancic (born 1978), Slovenian–Canadian rower
- Romina Tejerina (born 1983), Argentine murderer
- Romina Uhrig (born 1988), Argentine politician
- Romina Yan (1974–2010), Argentine singer, dancer, and actress

== Fictional characters ==
- Romina A. Mondragon, a character from Philippine drama series Kadenang Ginto

== See also ==
- Tropical Storm Pabuk (2024) called Romina in the Philippines
- Roma (given name)
- Roman (disambiguation)
