= TableTop =

Web series about games

YouTube information
- Channel: geekandsundry
- Years active: 2012–2017
- Genre: Gaming

TableTop is a web series about games, directed by Jennifer Arnold. It was created by Wil Wheaton and Felicia Day and was hosted by Wheaton. TableTop was published on Day's YouTube channel, Geek & Sundry. In each episode, following a brief explanation of one or more tabletop games, Wheaton plays the games with one or more guests—usually web or TV personalities.

A wide range of hobby gaming titles have been played, from classic German-style board games and family games to RPGs and card games. It has been described as "like Celebrity Poker meets Dinner for Five, where interesting people got together for tabletop games."

After two seasons, the show announced that its third season would be crowdfunded via Indiegogo, and was the most successful digital series campaign on that site until Con Man broke its record in March 2015. The series ended in 2017.

== Episodes ==
=== Season 1 (2012–13) ===
No.	Title	Guests	Winner(s)	Original release date
1	"Small World"	Grant Imahara, Jenna Busch, Sean Plott	Sean Plott	March 30, 2012
2	"Settlers of Catan"	Neil Grayston, Jane Espenson, James Kyson Lee	Neil Grayston	April 20, 2012
3	"Tsuro, Zombie Dice & Get Bit"	Rod Roddenberry, Ryan Higa, Freddie Wong	Ryan Higa	May 4, 2012
4	"Ticket to Ride"	Colin Ferguson, Anne Wheaton, Amy Dallen	Colin Ferguson	May 18, 2012
5	"Munchkin"	Steve Jackson, Sandeep Parikh, Felicia Day	Steve Jackson	June 1, 2012
6	"Castle Panic"	Yuri Lowenthal, Tara Platt, Andre Meadows	Team Win	June 15, 2012
7	"Gloom"	Amber Benson, Michele Boyd, Meghan Camarena	Amber Benson, Meghan Camarena & Wil Wheaton	June 29, 2012
8	"Fiasco, Part 1"	John Rogers, Alison Haislip, Bonnie Burton	N/A	July 13, 2012
9	"Fiasco, Part 2"	John Rogers, Alison Haislip, Bonnie Burton	N/A	July 27, 2012
10	"Say Anything"	Josh A. Cagan, Matt Mira, Jonah Ray	Jonah Ray	August 9, 2012
11	"Elder Sign"	Mike Morhaime, Bill Prady, Felicia Day	Team Win	August 23, 2012
12	"Dixit"	Casey McKinnon, Beth Riesgraf, Leo Chu	Beth Riesgraf	September 6, 2012
13	"Wits & Wagers"	Veronica Belmont, Phil LaMarr, Jimmy Wong	Veronica Belmont & Jimmy Wong	September 21, 2012
14	"Pandemic"	Morgan Webb, Ed Brubaker, Robert Gifford	Team Loss	October 4, 2012
15	"Last Night on Earth"	Riki Lindhome, Kate Micucci, Felicia Day	Riki Lindhome & Kate Micucci	October 18, 2012
16	"Star Fluxx"	Alex Albrecht, Chloe Dykstra, Jordan Mechner	Wil Wheaton	November 1, 2012
17	"Alhambra"	Ashley Johnson, Shane Nickerson, Dodger Leigh	Dodger Leigh	January 3, 2013
18	"Chez Geek"	Paul Sabourin, Greg "Storm" DiCostanzo, Andrew Hackard	Andrew Hackard	January 17, 2013
19	"Dragon Age, Part 1"	Sam Witwer, Kevin Sussman, Chris Hardwick, Chris Pramas	N/A	January 31, 2013
20	"Dragon Age, Part 2"	Sam Witwer, Kevin Sussman, Chris Hardwick, Chris Pramas	N/A	February 14, 2013
Extended Editions
1 (21)	Extended Edition: "Small World"	Grant Imahara, Jenna Busch, Sean Plott	Sean Plott	March 14, 2013
2 (22)	Extended Edition: "Castle Panic"	Yuri Lowenthal, Tara Platt, Andre Meadows	Team Win	March 21, 2013
3 (23)	Extended Edition: "Pandemic"	Robert Gifford, Morgan Webb, Ed Brubaker	Team Loss	March 28, 2013

=== Season 2 (2013–14) ===
No.	Title	Guests	Winner(s)	Original release date
1 (24)	"Formula D"	Grace Helbig, Greg Benson, Hannah Hart	Hannah Hart	April 4, 2013
2 (25)	"The Resistance"	Amy Okuda, Ashley Clements, Allison Scagliotti, Felicia Day	Felicia Day & Allison Scagliotti	April 18, 2013
3 (26)	"Once Upon a Time"	Amy Berg, Mike Phirman, Chris Wyatt	Amy Berg	May 2, 2013
4 (27)	"King of Tokyo"	John Bain, Craig Benzine, Greg Zeschuk	Craig Benzine	May 16, 2013
5 (28)	"Forbidden Island"	John Scalzi, Jason Finn, Bobak Ferdowsi	Team Loss	May 30, 2013
6 (29)	"Smash Up"	Rich Sommer, Cara Santa Maria, Jen Timms	Cara Santa Maria	June 13, 2013
7 (30)	"Star Trek Catan"	Jeri Ryan, Kari Wahlgren, Ryan Wheaton	Kari Wahlgren	July 18, 2013
8 (31)	"Star Wars: X-Wing"	Seth Green, Clare Grant, Mike Lamond	Seth Green & Clare Grant	August 8, 2013
9 (32)	"Lords of Waterdeep"	Patrick Rothfuss, Brandon Laatsch, Felicia Day	Patrick Rothfuss	August 22, 2013
10 (33)	"Shadows Over Camelot"	Tara Strong, Jerry Holkins, Mike Krahulik	Wil Wheaton	October 3, 2013
11 (34)	"Betrayal at House on the Hill, Part 1"	Ashly Burch, Keahu Kahuanui, Michael Swaim	N/A	October 17, 2013
12 (35)	"Betrayal at House on the Hill, Part 2"	Ashly Burch, Keahu Kahuanui, Michael Swaim	Wil Wheaton	October 24, 2013
13 (36)	"Takenoko"	Harley Morenstein, Rosanna Pansino, Drew Roy	Harley Morenstein	November 14, 2013
14 (37)	"Unspeakable Words"	Troy Baker, Erin Gray, Felicia Day	Troy Baker	November 28, 2013
15 (38)	"Qwirkle & 12 Days"	Kelly Hu, Meredith Salenger, Nolan Kopp	Meredith Salenger	December 12, 2013
16 (39)	"Carcassonne"	Kumail Nanjiani, Jesse Cox, Nika Harper	Wil Wheaton	December 26, 2013
17 (40)	"Tsuro of the Seas"	Kevin Pereira, Brendan Halloran, Andy Hull	Andy Hull	January 9, 2014
18 (41)	"Ticket to Ride: Europe"	Emma Caulfield, John Kovalic, Anne Wheaton	John Kovalic	January 23, 2014
19 (42)	"Fortune and Glory"	Brandon Routh, Ryon Day, Felicia Day	Wil Wheaton, declined in favor of Felicia Day	February 6, 2014
20 (43)	"Lords of Vegas"	Miracle Laurie, Laser Malena-Webber, Aubrey Webber	Wil Wheaton	February 20, 2014
Extended Editions
1 (44)	Extended Edition: "Formula D"	Grace Helbig, Greg Benson, Hannah Hart	Hannah Hart	June 27, 2013
2 (45)	Extended Edition: "Star Trek Catan"	Jeri Ryan, Kari Wahlgren, Ryan Wheaton	Kari Wahlgren	September 19, 2013
3 (46)	Extended Edition: "Tsuro of the Seas"	Kevin Pereira, Brendan Halloran, Andy Hull	Andy Hull	March 14, 2014
4 (47)	Extended Edition: "Carcassonne"	Jesse Cox, Nika Harper, Kumail Nanjiani	Wil Wheaton	March 28, 2014
5 (48)	Extended Edition: "Qwirkle and 12 Days"	Kelly Hu, Meredith Salenger, Nolan Kopp	Meredith Salenger	April 17, 2014
6 (49)	Extended Edition: "Star Wars X-Wing"	Seth Green, Clare Grant, Mike Lamond	Seth Green & Clare Grant	June 5, 2014
7 (50)	Extended Edition: "Takenoko"	Harley Morenstein, Rosanna Pansino, Drew Roy	Harley Morenstein	June 12, 2014
8 (51)	Extended Edition: "Lords of Waterdeep"	Felicia Day, Patrick Rothfuss, Brandon Laatsch	Patrick Rothfuss	June 20, 2014

=== Season 3 (2014–15) ===
No.	Title	Guests	Winner(s)	Original release date
1 (52)	"Tōkaidō"	J. August Richards, Chris Kluwe, Jason Wishnov	J. August Richards	November 13, 2014
2 (53)	"Forbidden Desert"	Alan Tudyk, Jon Heder, Felicia Day	Team Win	November 27, 2014
3 (54)	"Catan Junior"	Emily Anderson, Brett Baligrad, Adam Chernick	Adam Chernick	December 11, 2014
4 (55)	"The Hare and the Tortoise & Council of Verona"	David Kwong, Alison Haislip, Jessica Merizan	Jessica Merizan	December 25, 2014
5 (56)	"Stone Age"	Jordan Maron, Nika Harper, Jesse Cox	Jordan Maron	January 8, 2015
6 (57)	"Geek Out"	Clare Kramer, Anne Wheaton, Bonnie Burton	Anne Wheaton & Bonnie Burton	January 22, 2015
7 (58)	"Sheriff of Nottingham"	Derek Mio, Meredith Salenger, Ashley Clements	Ashley Clements	February 5, 2015
8 (59)	"Dead of Winter"	Dodger Leigh, Grant Imahara, Ashley Johnson	Team Loss	February 19, 2015
9 (60)	"Epic Spell Wars of the Battle Wizards: Duel at Mt. Skullzfyre"	Emily Gordon, Jonah Ray, Veronica Belmont	Emily Gordon	March 5, 2015
10 (61)	"Cards Against Humanity"	Aisha Tyler, Ali Spagnola, Laina Morris	Aisha Tyler	March 19, 2015
11 (62)	"Five Tribes"	Satine Phoenix, Richard Garriott, Jenna Busch	Wil Wheaton	April 9, 2015
12 (63)	"Concept"	Joseph Scrimshaw, Rhett McLaughlin, Link Neal	Team Win	April 23, 2015
13 (64)	"Dread, Part 1"	Laura Bailey, Molly Lewis, Ivan Van Norman	N/A	May 7, 2015
14 (65)	"Dread, Part 2"	Laura Bailey, Molly Lewis, Ivan Van Norman	Laura Bailey	May 14, 2015
15 (66)	"Libertalia"	Karen Gillan, Seth Green, Clare Grant	Wil Wheaton	May 21, 2015
16 (67)	"Love Letter & Coup"	Benny Fine, Rafi Fine, Felicia Day	Benny Fine & Wil Wheaton	June 4, 2015
17 (68)	"Kingdom Builder"	Paul Scheer, Yuri Lowenthal, Tara Platt	Yuri Lowenthal	June 18, 2015
18 (69)	"Legendary"	Allie Brosh, Mark Fischbach, Brea Grant	Team Win (Allie Brosh)	July 2, 2015
19 (70)	"Roll For It & Sushi Go!"	Jason Ritter, Jennifer Hale, John Ross Bowie	Wil Wheaton	July 16, 2015
20 (71)	"Mice and Mystics Pt. 1"	Anne Wheaton, Ryan Wheaton, Nolan Kopp	N/A	August 13, 2015
21 (72)	"Mice and Mystics Pt. 2"	Anne Wheaton, Ryan Wheaton, Nolan Kopp	N/A	August 20, 2015
Behind the Scenes
1 (73)	"Intro"	N/A	N/A	November 20, 2014
2 (74)	"A Producers Mirage"	N/A	N/A	December 4, 2014
3 (75)	"A Camera Made of Stone"	N/A	N/A	January 15, 2015
4 (76)	"Directing Robin Hood"	N/A	N/A	February 12, 2015
5 (77)	"Undead Game Designers"	N/A	N/A	February 26, 2015
6 (78)	"My Kingdom for an Editor!"	N/A	N/A	June 25, 2015
7 (79)	"Delicious Art Designers"	N/A	N/A	July 23, 2015

=== Season 4 (2016–17) ===
On December 31, 2015, Wil Wheaton announced the fourth season of TableTop would begin production in April 2016. Wheaton estimated early June 2016 for the release of the first episode but did not provide a firm release date. After filming ended in May 2016, Wheaton revised the estimated release to July 2016, but mentioned that he actually has no say over the release date. The list of games was released April 22, 2016, but not the final order or release dates. On July 28, 2016, Wheaton announced that release of season 4 was delayed, saying "Legendary has decided to delay the release of season four until later this year. As soon as we know exactly when it is, I'll make a big old announcement." On October 15, 2016, it was announced on Twitter that Season 4 of TableTop would premiere on November 2, with the first two episodes released on both YouTube and Legendary Digital Networks' subscription streaming service, Alpha, and the rest of the season initially only on Alpha but to be released on YouTube in early 2017. A Reddit comment made by Wheaton on January 13 stated that episodes should be released publicly on YouTube starting the week of January 30. Geek and Sundry announced via their Facebook page on January 31 that episodes would begin streaming on YouTube the next day, February 1.

No.	Title	Guests	Winner(s)	Original release date
1 (80)	"Lanterns"	Ivan Van Norman, Becca Scott, Zac Eubank	Becca Scott	November 2, 2016
2 (81)	"Champions of Midgard"	Chris Kluwe, Marisha Ray, Alison Haislip	Chris Kluwe	November 9, 2016
3 (82)	"Monarch"	Satine Phoenix, Ashley Clements, Brea Grant	Satine Phoenix	November 24, 2016
4 (83)	"Tiny Epic Galaxies"	Andy Weir, Mayim Bialik, Tim Schafer	Andy Weir	December 6, 2016
5 (84)	"Fury of Dracula, Part 1"	Amy Okuda, Grant Imahara, Ify Nwadiwe	N/A	December 21, 2016
6 (85)	"Fury of Dracula, Part 2"	Amy Okuda, Grant Imahara, Ify Nwadiwe	Wil Wheaton	December 21, 2016
7 (86)	"Harbour"	Kyle Newman, Matt Mercer, Nika Harper	Matt Mercer	January 4, 2017
8 (87)	"Dragon Farkle"	Derek Mio, Neil Grayston, Brandon Routh	Brandon Routh	January 18, 2017
9 (88)	"Star Realms"	Melissa DeTora	Melissa DeTora	January 31, 2017
10 (89)	"Fate Core RPG"	Ryan Macklin, John Rogers, Felicia Day	N/A	February 15, 2017
11 (90)	"Star Trek: Five-Year Mission"	Jaime King, Jessica Chobot, Jesse Cox	Team Loss	March 1, 2017
12 (91)	"Mysterium"	Shannon Woodward, David Kwong, Laura Bailey	Team Win	March 15, 2017
13 (92)	"Steam Park"	Jonathan Coulton, Paul Sabourin, Greg "Storm" DiCostanzo	Jonathan Coulton	March 29, 2017
14 & 15 (93–94)	"Misspent Youth"	Matt Fraction, Kelly Sue DeConnick, Amy Dallen	N/A	April 12, 2017
16 (95)	"Flash Point: Fire Rescue"	Clare Grant, Seth Green, Kelly Hu	Team Loss	April 26, 2017
17 (96)	"Welcome to the Dungeon"	Janet Varney, River Butcher, Hector Navarro	Wil Wheaton	May 10, 2017
18 (97)	"Codenames"	Travis Willingham, Jackie Kashian, Michelle Morrow, Ashley Esqueda, John Ross Bowie	Travis Willingham, Michelle Morrow, Ashley Esqueda	May 24, 2017
19 (98)	"Eldritch Horror, Part 1"	Patrick Rothfuss, Stef Woodburn, Jessica Merizan	N/A	June 7, 2017
20 (99)	"Eldritch Horror, Part 2"	Patrick Rothfuss, Stef Woodburn, Jessica Merizan	Team Win	June 7, 2017

== Funding campaign ==
On April 5, 2014, Wil Wheaton announced the launch of a campaign on Indiegogo to fund the creation of a third season. The target amount was $500,000 to produce 15 episodes, with additional targets of $750,000 to produce a full season of 20 episodes, and $1,000,000 to film a spin-off RPG series. The campaign exceeded its goals, eventually closing with $1,414,159.

== Impact ==
Evidence presented by a Canadian online game retailer showed that games featured in TableTop received a boost in sales after the episode aired: this was dubbed "The Wheaton Effect". Game publisher Days of Wonder has said that having titles featured on the show had significant boost on sales.

After the game Tsuro was featured, demand was so high that the publisher exhausted all stock reserves. The game was, for a time, unavailable in Europe as production tried to cope with US demand.

In 2013, the web series won the Diana Jones Award, citing that "TableTop has brought a new energy and humour to the board-game field: its blend of good humour and gameplay is pitch-perfect and has introduced a range of titles from modern classics to indie RPGs to thousands of new players."

TableTop won the gold ENnie for Best Podcast at the 2013 Gen Con EN World RPG Awards for its Dragon Age episodes. The award was accepted by Chris Pramas on behalf of Wil Wheaton.

TableTop won the Origins Award for "Best Game-Related Publication of 2013".

The Doubleclicks wrote a song about TableTop, featured on their 2014 album Dimetrodon

== International TableTop Day ==
The first International TableTop Day, founded by Boyan Radakovich, was held on March 30, 2013 and was live-streamed on the Geek & Sundry channel on YouTube. Games included Takenoko, Ticket to Ride, 7 Wonders, Smash Up, and Star Trek Catan; with several of the first season guests returning to play. It aired in two segments hosted by Felicia Day and Wil Wheaton, with an extra wrap-up segment uploaded later. Events were held in 64 countries.

The second International TableTop Day was held on April 5, 2014. The event was again live-streamed on YouTube, and the games shown were KrosMaster: Arena, Tanto Cuore, Rampage, and Love Letter. Events were held in over 80 countries.

The third International TableTop Day was held on April 11, 2015.

The fourth installment took place on April 30, 2016.

The fifth International TableTop Day took place on April 29, 2017, and the games shown were King of Tokyo, Rhino Hero, Fuse, Dread Draw, Codenames, Dread RPG, Tsuro, Attack on Titan and Dark Souls.

The sixth International TableTop Day took place on April 28, 2018, and the games shown were The Climbers, Grimm Forest, Flip Ships, World Wide Wrestling, and Marvel Contest of Champions – Battlerealm.

The seventh International Tabletop Day took place on June 1, 2019.
