= Changeland =

2019 film directed by Seth Green

- Theatrical release poster
- Directed by: Seth Green
- Written by: Seth Green
- Produced by: Corey Moosa
- Starring: Seth Green; Breckin Meyer; Brenda Song; Macaulay Culkin; Clare Grant; Randy Orton; Rose Williams; Kedar Williams-Stirling
- Cinematography: Patrick Ruth
- Edited by: Elizabeth Yng-Wong
- Music by: Patrick Stump
- Production companies: Living Films; Stoopid Buddy Stoodios; Karivara Films
- Distributed by: Gravitas Ventures
- Release date: June 7, 2019 (United States)
- Running time: 86 minutes
- Country: United States
- Language: English

Changeland is a 2019 American comedy-drama film written and directed by Seth Green in his directorial debut. The film stars Green and Breckin Meyer alongside Brenda Song, Clare Grant, Kedar Williams-Stirling, Rose Williams, Randy Orton, and Macaulay Culkin. It was released on June 7, 2019, by Gravitas Ventures.

== Plot ==
Brandon, a reserved and emotionally withdrawn man, discovers that his wife has been unfaithful shortly before an anniversary trip he had planned to Thailand. Rather than confront the situation directly, he invites his estranged childhood friend Dan to accompany him on the journey instead. During their stay in Thailand, the two reconnect while traveling through various locations and encountering a range of people, including tour guides and other travelers. While Dan embraces the experience and encourages Brandon to reflect on his situation, Brandon remains preoccupied with his failing marriage and uncertain about his future. As the trip progresses, their friendship is tested and gradually renewed. Through their interactions and experiences abroad, Brandon is confronted with choices about his personal life and relationships, leading him to reconsider his priorities and outlook.

== Cast ==
- Seth Green as Brandon
- Breckin Meyer as Dan
- Brenda Song as Pen
- Macaulay Culkin as Ian
- Clare Grant as Dory
- Randy Orton as Martin
- Rose Williams as Emma
- Kedar Williams-Stirling as Marc
- Rob Paulsen as Dad
- Andrea Romano as Mom

== Production ==
The film was announced on June 21, 2017. It marks the feature directorial debut of Seth Green, who also stars in the film alongside Breckin Meyer, Macaulay Culkin, Brenda Song, Clare Grant, Rose Williams, Kedar Williams-Stirling and Randy Orton. Filming in Thailand began that same week. Patrick Stump, who composed the film score, has an uncredited cameo appearance as an airline passenger in the film's opening scene.

It was executive produced by Stoopid Buddy Stoodios' Matthew Senreich, John Harvatine IV, and Eric Towner; Living Films' Chris Lowenstein and Oliver Ackermann; Karivara Films's Jimmy Matthews and John Lee; and Cohen Gardner's Jonathan Gardner.

== Release ==
In March 2019, Gravitas Ventures acquired distribution rights to the film and set it for a June 7, 2019 release.

== Reception ==
On Rotten Tomatoes, the film has an approval rating of 56% based on 9 reviews with an average rating of 6.10/10. On Metacritic, it has a score of 42 out of 100, based on four critics, indicating "mixed or average" reviews.
