= Geek and Gamer Girls =

Single by Team Unicorn featuring Seth Green
- Released: September 15, 2010 (music video); May 21, 2011 (digital download)
- Genre: Pop, dance
- Length: 4:16
- Songwriters: Michele Boyd, Milynn Sarley, Clare Grant, Rileah Vanderbilt

Music videos
- Geek and Gamer Girls Song on YouTube
- Geek and Gamer Girls (extended version) on YouTube

"Geek and Gamer Girls", stylized G33K & G4M3R Girls, is a music video by the girl group Team Unicorn. It pays tribute to women who love gaming, manga, and science fiction. The video reached 1 million views in its first week online but met with a mixed reception over its portrayal of the women. Robot Chicken creator Seth Green performs a rap in the video. Actress Katee Sackhoff and comic book creator Stan Lee also appear. The music video is noted for its abundance of cultural references. parodying Katy Perry's "California Gurls".

== Music video ==
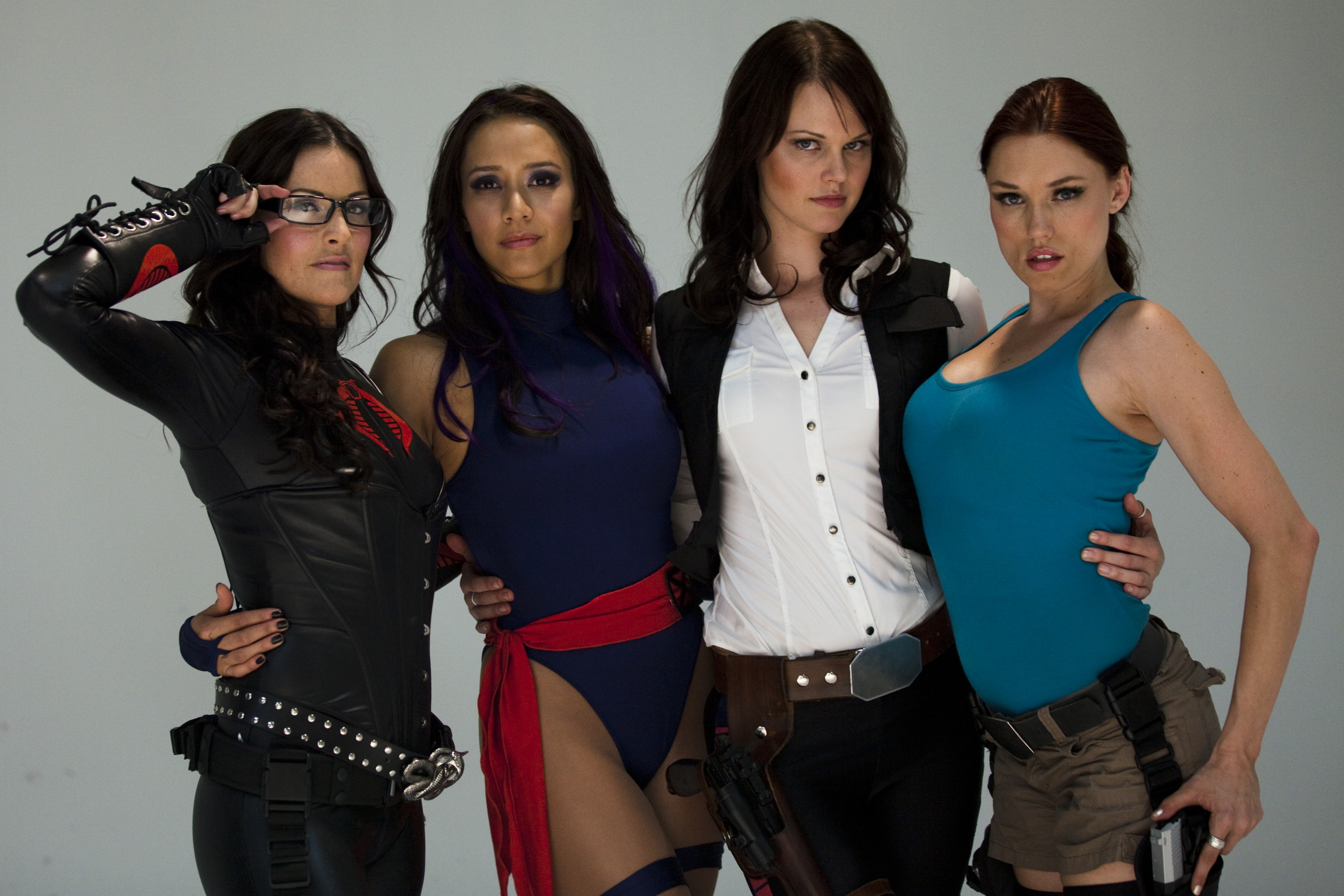
Team Unicorn, dressed as in the video.

The video utilizes a number props and costumes relevant to geek culture; most notably elements of video games, Star Wars, collectible toys, superheroes, film & television, Star Trek, and comic books. The members of Team Unicorn appear dressed as prominent pop culture characters:

- The Baroness (Rileah Vanderbilt)
- Han Solo (Michele Boyd)
- Psylocke (Milynn Sarley)
- Lara Croft (Clare Grant)

The video also includes appearances by a number of uncredited male dancers, also dressed in similar pop culture related costumes. The dancers appear as such characters as The Flash, Spock, Darth Maul, Spider-Man, and Legolas.

Seth Green, who was involved in the production of the video, raps a verse in the song. Green is married to Team Unicorn member Clare Grant. Comic book creator Stan Lee makes two appearances in the video, as does actress Katee Sackhoff- best known for her role as Kara "Starbuck" Thrace in the re-imagined Battlestar Galactica franchise.
