= 3 Musketeers (film) =

- DVD cover
- Directed by: Cole McKay
- Written by: Edward DeRuiter
- Based on: The Three Musketeers by Alexandre Dumas (uncredited)
- Produced by: David Michael Latt; David Rimawi; Paul Bales
- Starring: Heather Hemmens; XIN; Alan Rachins; Keith Allan; Michele Boyd; David Chokachi
- Cinematography: Ben Demaree
- Music by: Chris Ridenhour
- Distributed by: The Asylum
- Release date: October 25, 2011
- Running time: 90 minutes
- Country: United States
- Language: English
- Budget: $300,000

3 Musketeers is a direct-to-video action film by The Asylum loosely based on the 1844 novel The Three Musketeers by Alexandre Dumas. The film is directed by Cole McKay and is a mockbuster that was released shortly after the Paul W. S. Anderson film The Three Musketeers. The film was released on DVD and Blu-ray on October 25, 2011.

Unlike other adaptations of The Three Musketeers, this film is a modern take on the original story.

== Premise ==
Secret Service rookie Alexandra D'Artagnan enlists the help of legendary black ops unit, The 3 Musketeers (master strategist Oliver Athos, enigmatic martial arts expert Renee Aramis and wisecracking hacker Isaac Porthos), to investigate a government coup. They uncover a corrupt general's plans to assassinate the President of the United States and install a military regime. D'Artagnan and the three infamous international spies work together to stop the threat.

== Cast ==
- Heather Hemmens as Alexandra D'Artagnan
- Xin Sarith Wuku as Oliver Athos
- Keith Allan as Isaac Porthos
- Michele Boyd as Renee Aramis
- David Chokachi as Lewis
- Darren Thomas as Rockford
- Alan Rachins as Treville
- Simon Hang-bock Rhee as a Commander
- Andy Clemence as President King
- Edward DeRuiter as Jenkins
