= Team Unicorn =

Multimedia production team

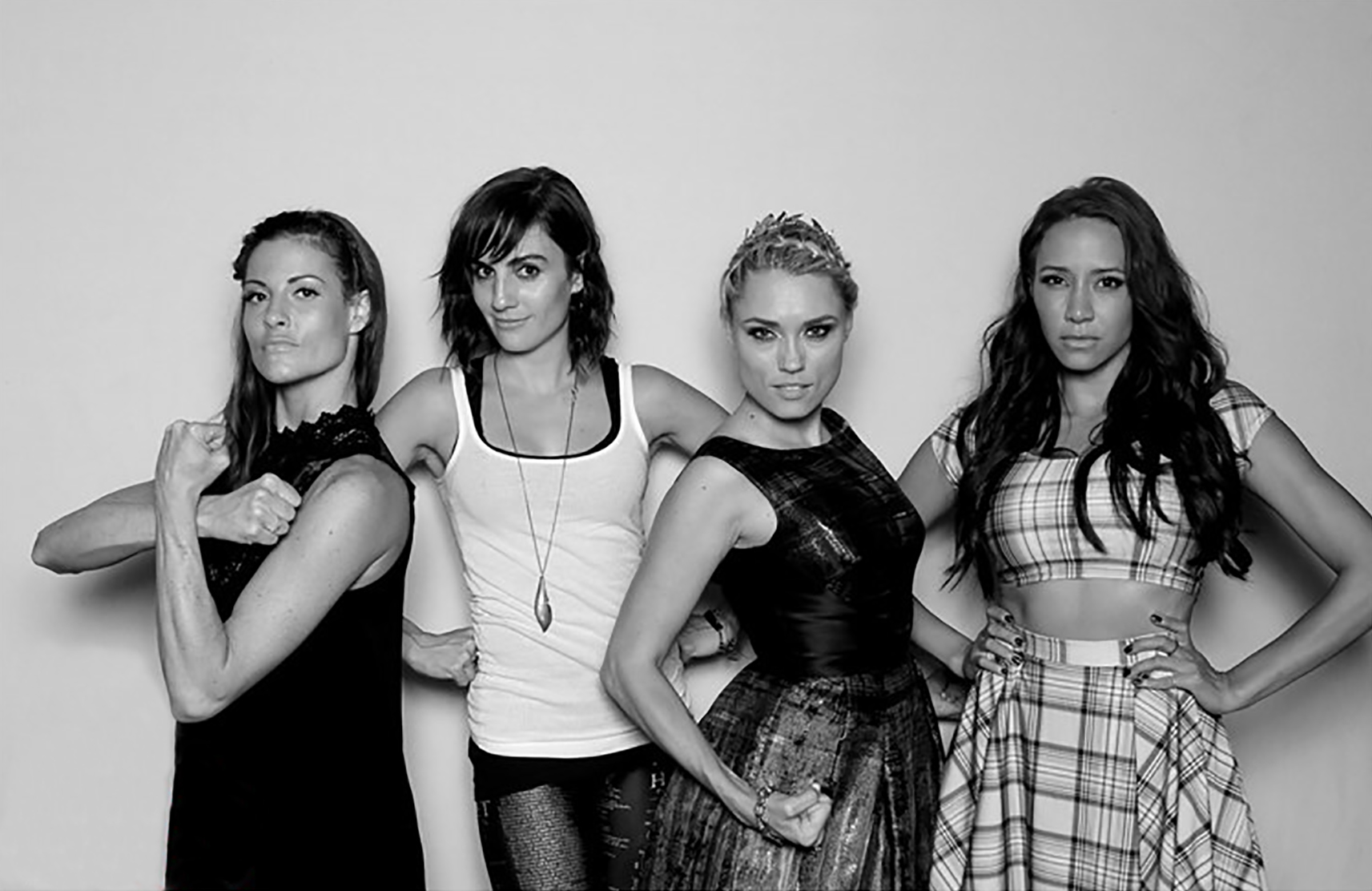
- Team Unicorn at San Diego Comic-Con in 2015

Background information
- Origin: Los Angeles, California
- Genres: Parody, comedy, nerd music
- Instrument: Vocals
- Years active: 2010–present
- Members: Clare Grant; Milynn Sarley; Rileah Vanderbilt; Alison Haislip
- Past members: Michele Boyd
- Website: teamunicornftw.com

Team Unicorn is a multimedia production team formed in Los Angeles, California, in 2010. Its current members are American actresses Clare Grant, Rileah Vanderbilt, Milynn Sarley, and Alison Haislip (who replaced Michele Boyd in 2014). The group is known for producing parody song videos such as "G33k & G4m3r Girls", a spoof of Katy Perry's "California Gurls", and "All About that Base", a Star Wars parody of Meghan Trainor's song "All About That Bass". The group had a pilot on Adult Swim called The Team Unicorn Saturday Action Fun Hour!, and have attended numerous science fiction and comic conventions.

== History ==
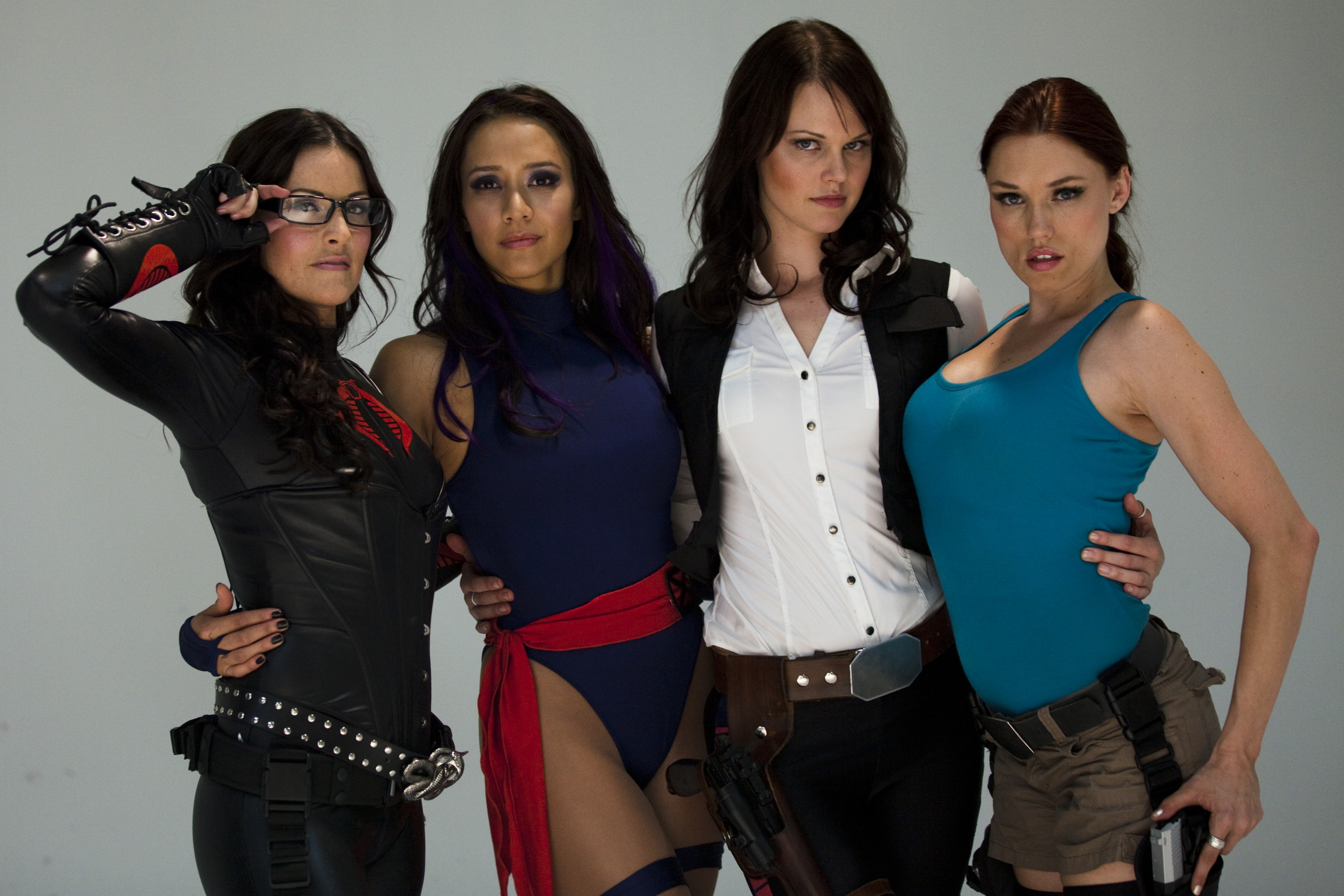
Team Unicorn, dressed as pop culture characters for their video "Geek and Gamer Girls" in 2010. Left to right: Rileah Vanderbilt, Milynn Sarley, Michele Boyd, Clare Grant

Rileah Vanderbilt is largely given credit to bringing the four women of Team Unicorn together. She and Clare Grant produced geek videos together and won two awards at the 2009 Star Wars Fan Film Awards for their short "Saber". Vanderbilt became friends with Milynn Sarley in 2009, and Michele Boyd was introduced in January 2010.

The group released its debut parody song "G33k & G4m3r Girls" online in September 2010. The music video, spoofing Katy Perry's "California Gurls", is filled with geek cultural references and pays tribute to women who love gaming, manga, and science fiction. The video reached 1 million views in its first week online, but met with some mixed responses to its portrayal of the women.

On December 7, 2014, Team Unicorn released "All About That Base", a parody of the Meghan Trainor song "All About That Bass", with the tagline lyric being "No Rebels". The video has a Star Wars theme and featured stormtroopers dancing alongside cheerleaders dressed in attire inspired by Darth Vader. Mitchell Peters of Billboard opined that the parody was "catchy" and "hilarious", while Donna Dickens of HitFix questioned whether the video sent the wrong message by "tacitly saying it's okay for geek girls to exist, only so long as they are acceptably 'hot'".

In 2013, Adult Swim announced a development agreement with the creators of Robot Chicken for a Team Unicorn live action/animation hybrid pilot called The Team Unicorn Saturday Action Fun Hour! which was intended to introduce Alison Haislip as the new Blue Unicorn, and star Jane Lynch, Alan Tudyk, Tara Strong, and Kevin Shinick, but it was never made.

== Filmography ==
=== Videos ===
List of Team Unicorn videos
Year	Title	Director	Notes	Refs
2010	"G33k & G4m3r Girls"	Dave Yarvo	Music video parody of "California Gurls"	
2010	A Very Zombie Holiday	Sean Becker		
2011	superHarmony	Sean Becker	eHarmony parody with superheroes	
2011	Alien Beach Crashers	Sean Becker		
2013	"For the Win!" (feat. "Weird Al" Yankovic)	Dave Yarvo	Music video by Stage5	
2014	The Team Unicorn Saturday Action Fun Hour!	Seth Green	Television pilot for Adult Swim	
2014	"All About That Base"	Sean Becker	Music video parody of "All About That Bass" and Star Wars	

=== Appearances ===
List of Team Unicorn appearances
Year	Title	Notes	Refs
2011	"F.E.A.R. 3 Comes to Life"	Promotional video by Fearnet for the video game F.E.A.R. 3	
2012	The Jace Hall Show		
2012	Top 100 Video Games of All Time	Guest on G4TV show	
2013	Robot Combat League	SyFy promotional clip where the group visits the show set	

== Awards and nominations ==
Year	Award	Category	Title of work	Result
2010	LA Weekly's Best of 2010	Best Online Video	"G33K & G4M3R Girls"	Won
2011	Dragon Con 2011 Film Festival Awards	Best Music Video	"G33K & G4M3R Girls"	Nominated
2012	International Academy of Web Television Awards	Best Variety Series	Team Unicorn	Nominated
