= Lisa Brenner =

American actress (born 1973/1974)

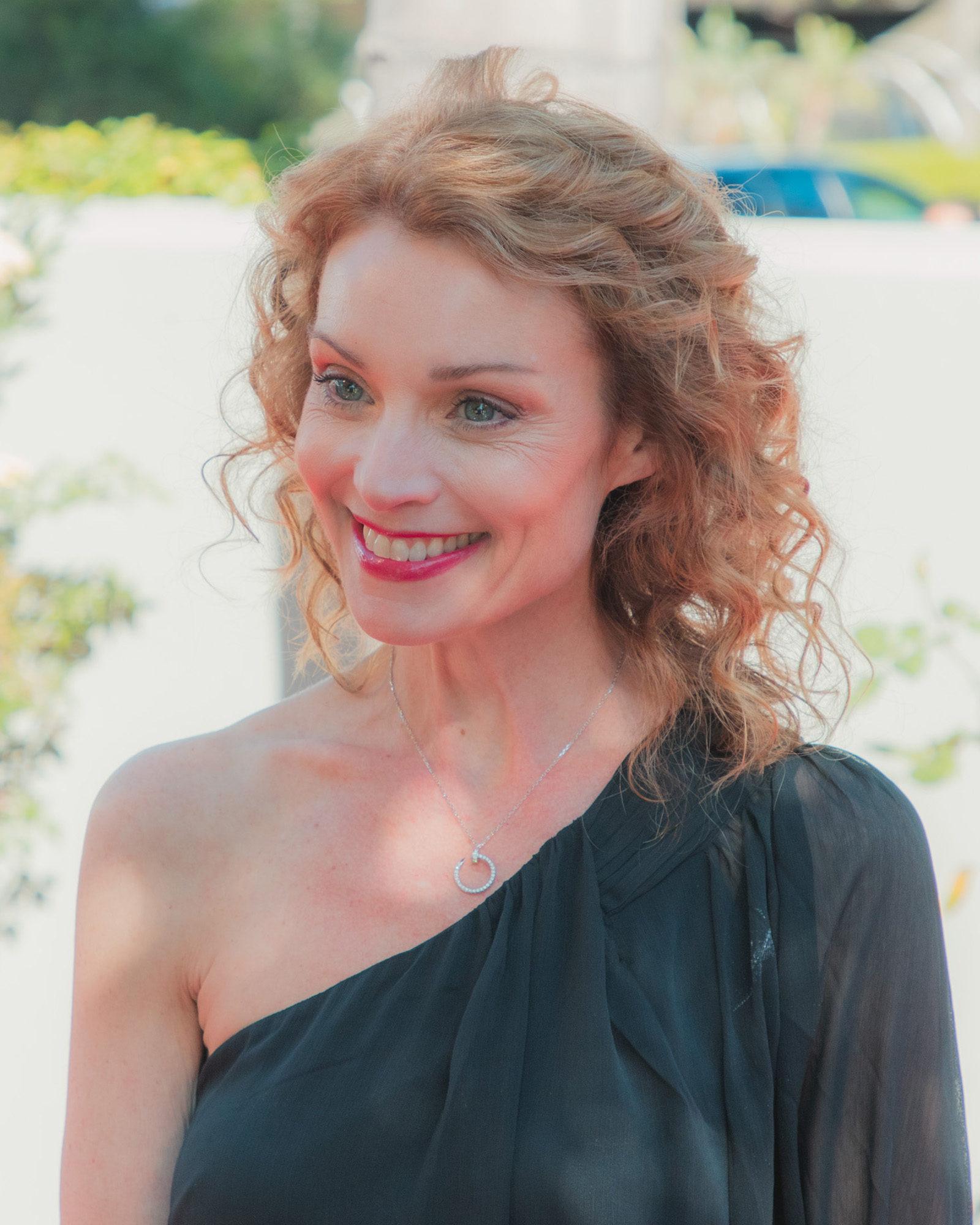
- Brenner in 2026
- Born: Lisa Goldstein; 1973/1974 (age 52–53)
- Occupation: Actress
- Years active: 1994–present
- Spouse: Dean Devlin (m. 2003)
- Children: 1
- Relatives: Pilar Seurat (mother-in-law)

Lisa Brenner (born Lisa Goldstein, 1973/1974) is an American actress. Brenner played Maggie Cory on Another World. She was also in All My Children as Allison Sloan. She played Anne in the 2000 film The Patriot.

== Biography ==
She attended Barnard College, majoring in both English and drama. She is married to Dean Devlin, the producer of The Patriot, and is of Jewish descent.

== Filmography ==
=== Film ===
Year	Title	Role	Notes
2000	The Patriot	Anne Howard	
2001	Alex in Wonder	Jan	
2003	What Boys Like	Reese	
2003	Finding Home	Amanda	
2007	I'm Through with White Girls	Molly	
2007	The Grand Design	Julie	Short
2009	Little Fish, Strange Pond	Juliet	
2011	The Price of Happiness	Cindy	
2014	César Chávez	Jackie Stringer	
2016	The Remains	Melissa	
2017	Thirsty Girl	Lily's Mom	Short
2018	Dance Baby Dance	Lanie	
2018	Bad Samaritan	Helen Leyton	
2018	Say My Name	Mary Page	
2025	One Big Happy Family	Rachel Torres	Writer/Producer

=== Television ===
Year	Title	Role	Notes
1994	All My Children	Allison Sloan	TV series
1995	Another World	Maggie Cory	Recurring role
1999	The Magnificent Seven	Miss Millie	"The New Law"
1999	Chicago Hope	Alison Malone	"Adventures in Babysitting"
1999	Turks	Carolyn	Recurring role
1999	Undressed	Jenny	Recurring role
1999	Brookfield	Emma Preston	TV film
2001	WWE Raw	Herself	"9.32"
2001	CSI: Crime Scene Investigation	Kelsey Fram	"Bully for You"
2003	Mister Sterling	Jessica	"The Statewide Swing"
2003	The Diary of Ellen Rimbauer	Ellen Gilcrest Rimbauer	TV film
2004	The Librarian: Quest for the Spear	Debra	TV film
2005	CSI: Miami	Gabrielle Marinelli	"Killer Date"
2005	McBride: Anyone Here Murder Marty?	Becky Tranter	TV film
2005	The Triangle	Helen Paloma	TV miniseries
2006	The Librarian: Return to King Solomon's Mines	Debra	TV film
2008	A Gunfighter's Pledge	Gail Austin	TV film
2008	Blank Slate	Anne Huston	TV film
2008	The Mentalist	Jennifer Sands	"Ladies in Red"
2010	Leverage	Dr. Anne Hannity	"The Inside Job"
2010	CSI: NY	Alena Maybrook	"Shop Till You Drop"
2014	We Are Angels	Miranda	TV series
2014–15	Perception	Tasha Ogden	"Prologue", "Romeo", "Run"
2015	Criminal Minds	Greta Thomas	"Scream"
2015	Maron	Tina	"The Request"
2016	Rizzoli & Isles	Christine Reynolds	"Murderjuana"
2016	Scorpion	Jill	"Little Boy Lost"
2019	Life in Pieces	Skylar	"Misery Turd Name Pills"
2023	The Ark	Susan Ingram	Recurring role
2023	Almost Paradise	Claire Walker	“Deus Ex-Wife Machina”
