= Battle of Los Angeles (film) =

- DVD Release Cover
- Directed by: Mark Atkins
- Written by: Mark Atkins; Michael Katleman
- Produced by: David Michael Latt; David Rimawi; Paul Bales; Michael Katleman
- Starring: Kel Mitchell; Nia Peeples; Theresa Jun-Tao
- Cinematography: Mark Atkins
- Distributed by: The Asylum
- Release date: March 12, 2011
- Running time: 91 minutes
- Country: United States
- Language: English

Battle of Los Angeles is a science fiction action film by The Asylum, which premiered on Syfy on Saturday March 12, 2011, and was released to DVD on March 20, 2011. The film is directed by Mark Atkins and is a mockbuster of the Columbia Pictures film Battle: Los Angeles, which is inspired by the events of the Great Los Angeles Air Raid of 1942. The official trailer uses clips from another Asylum film, War of the Worlds 2: The Next Wave.

== Plot ==
In February 1942, U.S. armed forces defend Los Angeles from unidentified flying objects. Seventy years later, the alien invaders return to finish the attack.

In the near future, a large spaceship arrives and hovers over Los Angeles. A human fighter squadron is scrambled, but their missiles act erratically due to countermeasures being broadcast from the ship. The entire squadron is quickly destroyed, except for a female pilot named Lt. Solano, who ejects from her plane before it is destroyed.

Smaller alien craft suddenly attack a military base near Los Angeles. Marine Lt. Tyler Laughlin leads a group of survivors through the chaos following the attack, trying to find a safe haven. During their journey across the Los Angeles wasteland, Laughlin's group finds a surprisingly young World War II pilot named Captain Pete Rodgers. He claims his squadron was abducted by aliens back in 1942 while they were flying in the Bermuda Triangle. Rodgers joins Laughlin's group, as well as Lt. Solano. Soon, the group encounters a sword-wielding special agent named Karla Smaith who takes them to a top-secret underground bunker. She reveals that a secret branch of the government has held an alien captive for the past 60 years after his spaceship crashed. Just then, Rodgers reveals himself to be an android. He kills most of the base personnel and reveals the alien's plans for the colonization of Earth and the extermination of the human race.

After destroying Rodgers, Laughlin, Smaith and Solano escape using the captured alien's spacecraft. They travel to the alien mothership over the city, where they plan to destroy it and stop the alien invasion. Once on board the mothership, they encounter a large mollusk-like alien guarding the engines. The alien grabs Solano, and Smith and Laughlin try to save her, but she orders them not to and leave her, in order to concentrate on destroying the ship with planted explosives. They escape just as the ship explodes, crashing down on Los Angeles. Smaith and Laughlin watch the destruction, knowing the rest of Earth is safe.

== Cast ==
- Nia Peeples as Captain Karla Smaith
- Kel Mitchell as Lieutenant Tyler Laughlin
- Dylan Vox as Captain Pete Rodgers / Android
- Theresa June-Tao as Lieutenant Solano
- Gerald Webb as Newman
- Edward DeRuiter as Arnstead
- Darin Cooper as Captain Hadron
- Robert Pike Daniel as Commander Wakes
- Tim Abell as Colonel Macon
- Michele Boyd as Pilot Hendricks
- Stephen Blackehart as Pilot Kirkman
- Lorry O'Toole as Kaor

== See also ==
- 1941, the 1979 film by Steven Spielberg
