= Rileah Vanderbilt =

American actress and producer (born 1979)

- Born: Rileah Elizabeth Hayes; August 20, 1979 (age 47); Cripple Creek, Colorado, U.S.
- Occupations: Actress, producer
- Years active: 2006–present
- Notable work: Team Unicorn
- Spouse: Adam Green (m. 2010; div. 2014)
- Website: www.rileahvanderbilt.com

Rileah Elizabeth Vanderbilt is an American actress and producer. She is one of the founding members of Team Unicorn.

== Career ==
Vanderbilt's film debut was Hatchet, where she played the Young Victor Crowley. She reprised the role in Hatchet 2 and played Officer Dougherty in Hatchet 3; she also had minor roles in Spiral and Frozen.

With their production company Danger Maiden Productions, Vanderbilt and Clare Grant created, produced, and starred in the short film Saber, which won two awards at the 2009 Star Wars Fan Film Awards. In 2010, the duo worked with Milynn Sarley and Michele Boyd under the group name Team Unicorn to create a series of videos, beginning with G33k & G4m3r Girls, a parody of Katy Perry's California Gurls video, which achieved one million views in its first week. In 2011, she leaked online a racy commercial that she had filmed with Serena Williams for potential use in the Top Spin 4 marketing campaign; 2K Sports had declined to use the commercial and criticized the commercial's release by Vanderbilt as "unauthorized". In 2013, Adult Swim announced that Rileah co-created and will be starring in and executive producing a pilot based on the webseries she co-created, Team Unicorn. She appeared also as herself, along with Ray Wise, Kane Hodder, Tom Holland, Mick Garris and Steven Barton in Adam Green's horror mockumentary film Digging Up the Marrow.

== Personal life ==
Vanderbilt first met actor/director Adam Green in 2002 at the Rainbow Bar & Grill and married him on June 26, 2010.

== Filmography ==
=== Film ===
Year	Title	Role	Notes
2006	Hatchet	Young Victor Crowley	Supporting
2007	Spiral	Girl On Bus	Cameo
2007	King in the Box	Mrs. Box	short, Lead
2008	Boner Boyz!		
2008	Fairy Tale Police	Little Red Riding Hood	Supporting
2009	The Tivo	Susan	short, Lead
2010	Frozen	Shannon	Supporting
2010	No Rest for the Wicked: A Basil & Moebius Adventure	The Bartender	
2010	Hatchet II	Young Victor Crowley	Supporting
2013	The Return of Return of the Jedi: 30 Years and Counting	Herself	Commentator
2013	Hatchet III	SWAT Officer Mikaela Dougherty	Supporting
2013	The Pandora Project	Dana	Lead
2014	Digging Up the Marrow	Herself	Supporting
2015	Avengers Grimm	Rapunzel	Lead
2015	Mega Shark vs. Kolossus	Rileah	Supporting

=== Television/Internet ===
Year	Title	Role	Notes
2009	Saber	Jedi	co-creator producer
2009	PG Porn	Bargoer	episode: "High Poon"
2010	Ultradome	Indiana Jones	guest star, episode: "Buffy vs. Count Chocula"
2010	Team Unicorn: G33K & G4M3R Girls	Rileah	Executive Producer; Co-Creator; Writer; Backup Singer
2010	Team Unicorn: A Very Zombie Holiday	Narrator #1	Producer; Co-Creator
2011	Sexy Nightmare Slayers	Lexie	pilot producer lead
2011	The Guild	Princess Leia	cameo, episode: "Ends and Begins"
2011	Team Unicorn: superHarmony	Wonder Woman	Producer; Co-Creator
2011	Chiller 13: Horror's Creepiest Kids	Herself	Commentator
2011	Team Unicorn: Alien Beach Crashers	Young Lover	Producer; Co-Creator
2011	FearNet"s "Movies With More Brains"	Herself	Commentator
2012	Saber 2: Return of the Body Wash	Jedi	co-creator producer
2012	Top 100 Video Games Of All Time	Herself	Commentator
2012	Fan Wars	Team Bruce Wayne	guest star, episode: "Bruce Wayne vs. Tony Stark"
2013	Chiller 13: Most Horrifying Hook-ups	Herself	Commentator
2013	Team Unicorn: The UniCorps Wants YOU!	Purple Unicorn	Executive Producer; Co-Creator
2013	Team Unicorn: For the Win	Rileah	Executive Producer; Co-Creator; Writer; Back-Up Singer
2013	Team Unicorn Adult Swim Pilot	Purple Unicorn	Executive Producer; Co-Creator; Lead
2013	Holliston	Dana	3 episodes: "The Hooker: Part 1", "Kevin's Wedding", "Farm Festival", Guest Star

== Awards and nominations ==
Year	Award	Category	Title of work	Result
2009	The Official Star Wars Fan Film Awards	Best Action	Saber	Won
2009	The Official Star Wars Fan Film Awards	Audience Choice	Saber	Won
