= Finding Home =

- Directed by: Lawrence David Foldes
- Written by: Lawrence David Foldes; Grafton S. Harper; Carol Hay
- Story by: Lawrence David Foldes; Grafton S. Harper; Carol Hay; David Ruprecht; Steven F. Zambo
- Produced by: Victoria Paige Meyerink
- Starring: Geneviève Bujold; Lisa Brenner; Louise Fletcher; Johnny Messner
- Cinematography: Jeffrey Seckendorf
- Edited by: Todd Ramsay
- Music by: Joseph Conlan
- Distributed by: Castle Hill Productions
- Release date: October 18, 2003 (Hollywood)
- Running time: 124 minutes
- Country: United States
- Language: English

Finding Home is a 2003 American romantic drama film starring Geneviève Bujold, Lisa Brenner, Misha Collins, Louise Fletcher and Johnny Messner. The film marked the last full-length feature film appearance of actor Jason Miller.

== Plot ==
This is a story about family, love, and loss. It follows a young woman named Amanda (Lisa Brenner), and her journey in rediscovering the past. After finding out her grandmother (Louise Fletcher) has died, she finds herself inheriting her grandmothers B&B located on a small island. Going back to the island digs up mixed emotions and memories that Amanda must work through, while figuring out whether or not to sell the B&B. During her stay at the B&B, Amanda uncovers her grandmothers past and gets to the bottom of what really happened the summer she was forced to leave the island she once loved.

== Cast ==
- Lisa Brenner as Amanda
- Misha Collins as Dave
- Geneviève Bujold as Katie
- Louise Fletcher as Esther
- Jeannetta Arnette as Grace
- Sherri Saum as Candace
- Johnny Messner as Nick
- Andrew Lukich as C.J.
- Justin Henry as Prescott
- Jason Miller as Lester Brownlow
- Jennifer O'Kain as Young Esther
- Laura Thoren as Young Amanda
- Kyle Gallner as Young Dave
- Alexandra Palmari as Little Amanda
- Sandy Ward as Julian, The Lobsterman
- William Bookston as Chuck, The Postman
- Sean Blodgett as Delivery Boy

== Reception ==
The film has a 30% rating on Rotten Tomatoes. Norm Schrager of Contactmusic.com awarded the film one and a half stars out of five. Roger Ebert awarded the film one star.
