= Dance Baby Dance =

- Directed by: Stephen Kogon
- Written by: Stephen Kogon
- Produced by: Roy Bodner; Travis Huff; John Kaiser; Stephen Kogon
- Starring: Stephen Kogon; Beverley Mitchell; Hayley Shukiar; Clare Grant; Jim O'Heir; Carlos Alazraqui
- Cinematography: Shanele Alvarez
- Edited by: J. Horton
- Production company: Wings of Hope Productions
- Distributed by: Indie Rights
- Release date: 19 January 2018
- Running time: 93 minutes
- Country: United States
- Language: English

Dance Baby Dance is a 2018 American drama film directed by Stephen Kogon, starring Kogon, Beverley Mitchell, Hayley Shukiar, Clare Grant, Jim O'Heir and Carlos Alazraqui.

== Cast ==
- Stephen Kogon as Jimmy Percer
- Beverley Mitchell as Tess Percer
- Hayley Shukiar as Kit
- Clare Grant as Camille
- Jim O'Heir as Mr. Dalrymple
- Carlos Alazraqui as Hector
- Lisa Brenner as Lanie
- Isaiah Lucas as Ravon
- Leah Cevoli as Cindy
- Michelle Thomson as Veronica
- Ellen Kim as Sherry
- Jim Nowakowski as Dex
- Aaron DeWayne Williams as Kevin

== Reception ==
Alan Ng of Film Threat gave the film a score of 1.5/5 and wrote that while Mitchell is "strong enough to carry Kogon to make their scenes together tolerable", Kogon "prevents the serious moments the film needs from being taken seriously". Ng also called the choreography "mediocre at best" and the cinematography "just as uninspired as the dancing."

Kimber Myers of the Los Angeles Times wrote that the film "doesn’t just suffer from a predictable script; basic tenets of cinematography, lighting and editing are either ignored by or unfamiliar to those behind the camera."
