= Monty Miranda =

American film director

- Born: Monty Miranda; Hahn Air Base, Germany
- Occupations: Film director, filmmaker, writer, producer
- Years active: 1995–present
- Website: montymiranda.com

Monty Miranda is an American film director. His first feature film, Skills Like This, won the Best Narrative Feature Audience Award at the SXSW Film Festival. The film released theatrically on March 20, 2009, on DVD November 17, 2009 and premiered on Starz on December 31, 2009.

== Career ==
Following graduation from the University of Colorado at Boulder where he studied film and journalism, Monty Miranda founded the commercial production company Incite Films which began his directing career.

Skills Like This screened worldwide on the film festival circuit prior to its American theatrical release by Shadow Distribution in 2009. The film received positive reviews from The New York Times, Variety, and Salon.com. In her review for The New York Times, Jeanette Catsoulis wrote, "the offbeat chemistry of the cast, along with Monty Miranda's eye-catching direction...make all the difference..." Variety called the film "deftly directed" The film screened in theatrical release for four months.

The Insomniac is the second feature film directed by Monty Miranda. Principal photography took only 18 days, with two extra days for pick-ups. Miranda's third feature film is a 3D documentary American Mustang described as an "artful blend of exquisite nature documentary and character-driven narrative." The film was narrated by Daryl Hannah.

Miranda has also directed commercials and co-created the first TV series about video games, called Twitch. He has directed commercials for TiVo, McDonald's and Redbox, as well as writing and directing the launch promotions for BET Movies. His work has additionally been recognized by the Cannes Lions International Advertising Festival, the CLIO's, the Effie Award, the Addy's, BBC's Most Outrageous Commercials, the Broadcast Design Association and FOX's World's Funniest Commercials. His campaign ad for John Hickenlooper received coverage by CNN, the Los Angeles Times and The Washington Post.

== Awards and nominations ==
- SXSW Film Festival – Best Narrative Feature Audience Award
- Edinburgh International Film Festival – Best of the Fest
- Warsaw International Film Festival – "Free Spirit" Special Jury Award Nomination
- Jacksonville Film Festival – Jury Prize Award for Best USA Feature Narrative
- The Rocky Mountain News "Top 25 Movers and Shakers Art, Entertainment, and Culture, 2008"
