= Skills like This =

- Directed by: Monty Miranda
- Written by: Spencer Berger
- Starring: Spencer Berger; Brian D. Phelan; Kerry Knuppe
- Music by: Anthony Marinelli
- Production company: Shadow Distribution
- Release dates: March 10, 2007 (South by Southwest); March 20, 2009 (United States)

Skills like This is a 2007 comedy film directed by Monty Miranda, written by Spencer Berger and distributed by Shadow Distribution released theatrically on March 20, 2009. The DVD released on November 17, 2009, and the Premium Cable premiere on Starz and Starz On Demand 1.1. 2010. It stars Berger, Gabriel Tigerman, Kerry Knuppe and Brian D. Phelan.

== Accolades ==
- SXSW Film Festival "Best narrative feature audience award"
- Edinburgh International Film Festival "Best of the fest"
- Warsaw International Film Festival "Free spirit" - Special Jury Award Nomination
- Jacksonville Film Festival "Jury prize award for BestUSA feature narrative"

== Cast ==
- Spencer Berger as Max Solomon
- Brian D. Phelan as Tommy
- Gabriel Tigerman as Dave
- Kerry Knuppe as Lucy
- Jennifer Batter as Lauren

== Production ==
Spencer Berger both wrote and acts in the film. It was directed by first-time film director Monty Miranda, who previously directed television commercials, short films and created a TV series

The movie was shot in Denver, Colorado. Principal photography was completed in 17 days.

In addition to highlighting Denver, Colorado's eclectic music scene, Skills Like This is an entirely Colorado based production. Skills Like This is the first feature-length film produced in Colorado, by Colorado filmmakers to be picked up for North American theatrical distribution.

== Reception ==
The film won the award for Best Narrative Feature at the South by Southwest film festival. The film won the "Best of Fest" distinction at the Edinburgh International Film Festival The film won the "Jury Prize for Best USA Feature Film" at Jacksonville Film Festival

Skills Like This screened worldwide on the film festival circuit prior to its American theatrical release by Shadow Distribution in 2009. The film received positive reviews from publications ranging from The New York Times and Variety to Salon.com. In her review for The New York Times, Jeanette Catsoulis wrote, "the offbeat chemistry of the cast, along with Monty Miranda's eye-catching direction...make all the difference... Drawing much of its energy from an eclectic and fully integrated soundtrack, "Skills Like This" gazes indulgently on 20-something aimlessness and the comfort of assigned roles. In Mr. Miranda's hands sloth can be more appealing than you might think." Variety further stated that the main characters of Skills Like This showed "considerable intelligence and chemistry" in addition to calling the film "deftly directed" and from Salon Andrew O'Heir reviewed "Skills Like This" as, "Cheerfully anarchic...indescribably genuine." The film screened in theatrical release for four months.
