= Diagnosis X =

- Countries of origin: United States, Canada

Production
- Running time: 44 minutes (60 with commercials)

Original release
- Network: TLC
- Release: July 25, 2007

Diagnosis X is a television program on the channel TLC and Discovery Health. The original airdate was July 25, 2007. The series mixes regular actors with actual physicians, illustrating difficult to diagnose medical cases based on real life situations. It is filmed at the North Hollywood Medical Center, the shooting location of Scrubs (the fictional Sacred Heart Hospital) since 2001.

== Episodes ==
- "Secret Chemistry"
- "System Failure"
- "Crashing"
- "Smoke and Mirrors" - A man with obsessive-compulsive disorder misleads his doctors; a 2-year-old is mysteriously ill.
- "Hidden Truth" - A teenager suffers abdominal pain with results of a tumor, while a man suffers paralysis because his immune system attacks his nerves.
- "Shattered"
- "Family Secrets"
- "Jumping The Gun"
- "Under Pressure" - Woman has extreme and unexplainable chronic abdominal pain; a professional volleyball player is admitted with what starts as a routine broken bone but becomes a much bigger deal.
- "Desperate Measures" - An otherwise healthy patient suddenly crashes after a routine operation; a major miscommunication could cost a teenage boy his life.
