= Romina Goldszmid =

Argentine-American biologist

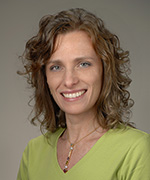
- Goldszmid in 2015
- Education: University of Buenos Aires
- Awards: PECASE (2019)
- Scientific career
- Fields: Tumor immunology
- Workplaces: National Institutes of Health

Silvana Romina Goldszmid is an Argentine-American biologist researching tumor immunology. She is an NIH Stadtman Investigator at the National Cancer Institute.

== Education ==
Romina Goldszmid completed a M.S. in biochemistry and a Ph.D. in immunology working on dendritic cell-based vaccines for melanoma tumor immunotherapy from the University of Buenos Aires, part of which was performed as a visiting scholar in the laboratory of Ralph M. Steinman at the Rockefeller University. In 2004, she came to the National Institutes of Health to conduct postdoctoral research in infectious disease immunology with Alan Sher in the Laboratory of Parasitic Diseases (LPD) at the National Institute of Allergy and Infectious Diseases (NIAID).

== Career and research ==
In 2009, Goldszmid returned to tumor immunology, joining laboratory of Giorgio Trinchieri at CCR, NCI, as a staff scientist. In 2015, she became an NIH Earl Stadtman Investigator in the Laboratory of Integrative Cancer Immunology and an adjunct investigator in LPD, NIAID. In 2019, she won a Presidential Early Career Award for Scientists and Engineers.

Goldszmid has a long-standing interest in understanding the mechanisms governing the development, functional maturation and dynamics of the mononuclear phagocyte cellular network [e.g. dendritic cells, monocytes and macrophages] that plays an instrumental role in host defense. In particular, her research focuses on linking the microbiome, mononuclear phagocyte development, and cancer and infectious diseases with the ultimate goal of identifying new potential therapeutic interventions to improve cancer treatment. Goldszmid and her colleagues showed for the first time that the gut microbiota control the response to cancer immunotherapy and chemotherapy by modulating myeloid-cell functions in the tumor microenvironment.
