= Route 66 (disambiguation) =

U.S. Route 66 is a former United States highway.

Route 66 may also refer to:

== Transportation ==
- List of highways numbered 66
  - U.S. Route 66
- London Buses route 66, in London, England
- Route 66 (MBTA), in Massachusetts
- SEPTA Route 66, in Philadelphia, Pennsylvania, U.S.
- National Cycle Route 66, in England

== Arts and entertainment ==
=== Film and television ===
- Route 66 (TV series), an American TV series 1960–1964
- Route 66 (1993 TV series), a reboot of the 1960s series
- Route 66 (film), a 1998 American film
- Route 66: An American (Bad) Dream, a film by VEB Film Leipzig
- Route 66, working title for the 2006 film Cars

=== Music ===
- "(Get Your Kicks on) Route 66", a rhythm and blues standard, composed in 1946 by Bobby Troup
- "Route 66 Theme", the theme tune of the TV series
- Route 66 (composition), a 1998 orchestral work by Michael Daugherty
- Route 66 (band), an American band

== Businesses ==
- Route 66 (company), the previous name of a Dutch navigation technology company, now named Magic Lane.
- Route 66 Records, a record label

== See also ==
- Route 666 (disambiguation)
- Route 66 Association, one of which exists for each state on historic U.S. Route 66
- Route 66 State Park, in Times Beach, Missouri, U.S.
- U.S. Highway 66 Association (1927–1976)
- Phillips 66, a gas station chain
- Route 66 Raceway, a drag racing strip in Joliet, Illinois, U.S.
