= Danielle Harris =

American actress

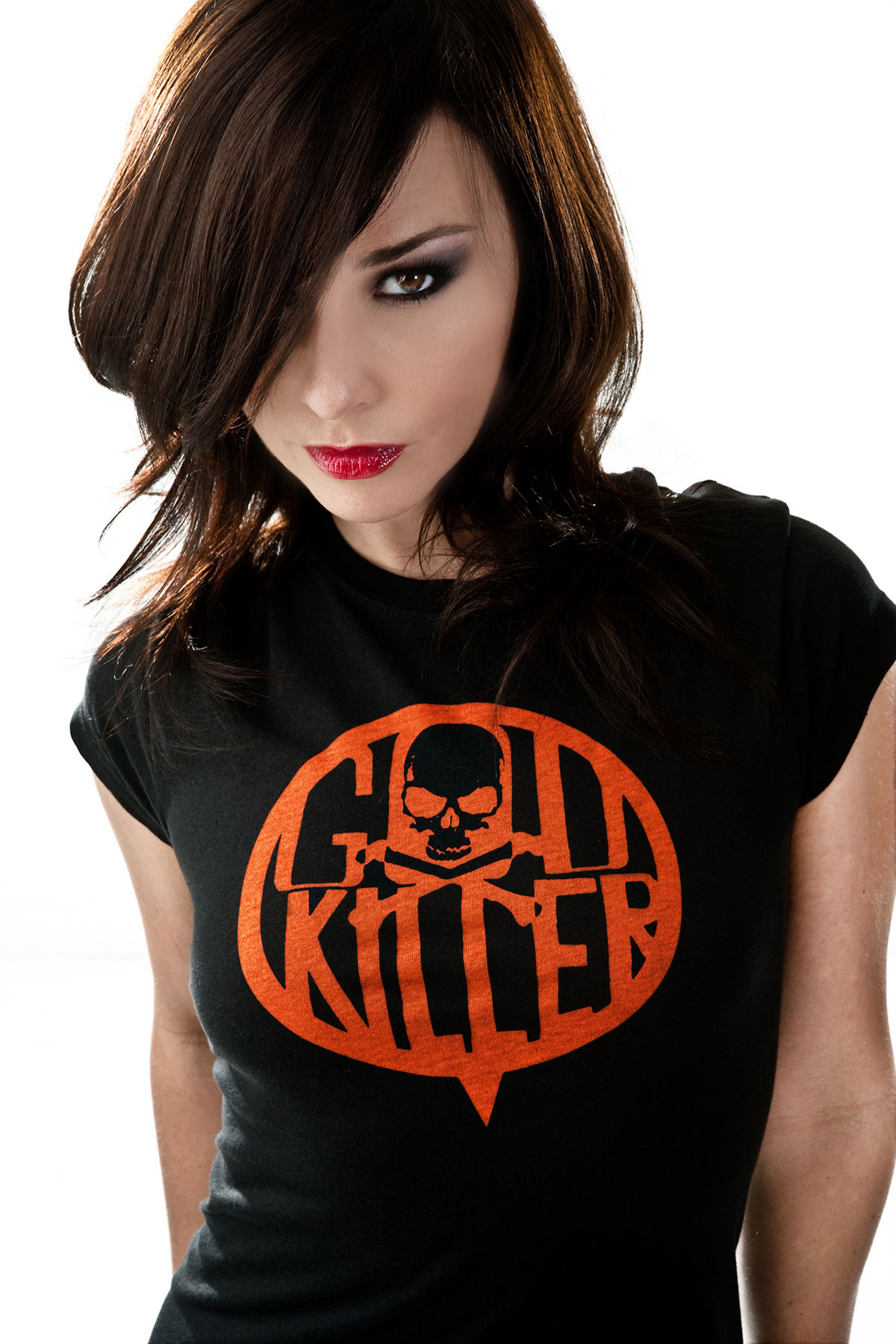
- Harris in 2010
- Born: June 1, 1977 (age 49); Plainview, New York, U.S.
- Occupations: Actress; director; producer
- Years active: 1984–present
- Known for: Halloween 4: The Return of Michael Myers; Halloween 5: The Revenge of Michael Myers; Halloween; Halloween II; Hatchet II; Hatchet III; Free Willy; The Wild Thornberrys; Urban Legend
- Spouse: David Gross (m. 2014)
- Children: 2
- Website: danielleharris.com

Danielle Harris (born June 1, 1977) is an American actress and filmmaker. She is known as a "scream queen" for her roles in multiple horror films, including four entries in the Halloween franchise: Halloween 4: The Return of Michael Myers (1988) and Halloween 5: The Revenge of Michael Myers (1989) as Jamie Lloyd, and Halloween (2007) and Halloween II (2009) as Annie Brackett. Other such roles include Tosh in Urban Legend (1998), Belle in Stake Land (2010), and Marybeth Dunston in the Hatchet series (2010–17). In 2012, she was inducted into the Fangoria Hall of Fame.

Harris began her career as a child actress, with various appearances on television and prominent roles in films such as Marked for Death (1990), Don't Tell Mom the Babysitter's Dead (1991), The Last Boy Scout (1991), Free Willy (1993), and Daylight (1996). She is equally known for her voice work, which includes playing Debbie Thornberry for the full run of The Wild Thornberrys (1998–2004) and in the related films The Wild Thornberrys Movie (2002) and Rugrats Go Wild (2003). She also voiced Sierra in the television series Father of the Pride (2004).

Harris made her feature directorial debut with the horror film Among Friends (2013), after previously directing a segment in the unfinished anthology film Prank in 2008 and a Stake Land companion short film in 2010.

== Early life ==
Harris was born in Plainview, New York and was raised by her mother Fran, along with her sister Ashley. Harris is Jewish. When she was two years old, she relocated with her mother and sister to Daytona Beach, Florida. During elementary school, Harris won a beauty contest, winning a trip to New York City for ten days. While there, she was offered various modeling jobs, but turned them down because they were all far from her home. Her mother was eventually transferred back to New York for work and Harris began work as a model. She also began appearing in television commercials.

== Career ==
=== 1985–1989: Early roles and Halloween ===
In 1985, at age seven, Harris was cast in the role of Samantha "Sammi" Garretson in the ABC soap opera One Life to Live and stayed on the program for three years. Her character was considered a "miracle child", extracted as an embryo from the womb of her deceased mother and implanted in a family friend, whom her father later married. In 1987, Harris made a guest appearance in the series Spenser: For Hire.

Following her early television work, Harris successfully auditioned for the role of Jamie Lloyd in the fourth edition of the Halloween franchise, beating out several other young actresses, Melissa Joan Hart among them. Halloween 4: The Return of Michael Myers was released in October 1988, grossing over $17 million on a $5 million budget. On doing this type of film at such a young age, Harris said:

It was fun for me. I knew we were making a movie and I knew that it was make believe. I was more worried about being a good, little actress and being able to cry and scream really good. I think everybody made such an amazing effort to make sure that I knew that it wasn't real. In between takes we would joke around and it was just fun. It didn't really bother me until I got to be older.

Harris returned the following year for the sequel, Halloween 5: The Revenge of Michael Myers, which did not perform as well as its predecessor at the box office. Harris portrayed Jamie Lloyd once again, this time her character being traumatized and mute for the first half of the film. Critics cited Harris' performance as one of the strongest aspects of the film.

=== 1990s: Film, television and voice work ===
In 1990, Harris appeared in Marked for Death as protagonist John Hatcher (Steven Seagal)'s niece Tracey. The action film had a $12 million budget and earned $43 million domestically and $57 million worldwide. 1991 saw Harris partake in several film and television projects, including the made-for-television films Don't Touch My Daughter, as a young girl who is kidnapped and molested, and The Killing Mind, in which she portrayed main character Isobel as a child. Later that year, Harris made an appearance in the sketch-oriented show In Living Color.

Harris' next film role was in the 1991 comedy Don't Tell Mom the Babysitter's Dead, as Melissa Crandell, with the story revolving around five siblings whose mother goes to Australia for two months, only to have her children's babysitter die. The young protagonists choose not to tell their mother and attempt to live on their own. The same year, Harris had a guest role in the series Eerie, Indiana, portraying a character who receives a heart transplant then begins to act like the heart's original owner, and also guest starred in an episode of Growing Pains, as Susie Maxwell. Harris had the role of Darian Hallenbeck in the 1991 action film The Last Boy Scout, alongside Bruce Willis and Damon Wayans. The film grossed $7,923,669 in its opening weekend, and the total gross was $59,509,925. Reviews were mixed, and some critics cited the Christmastime release for such a violent film as a reason for its underwhelming box office.

1992 saw Harris participate in the pilot for the potential CBS series 1775, although it was not picked up. Between 1992 and 1993, Harris had the recurring role of Molly Tilden on the sitcom Roseanne (which she would reprise in a 2021 episode of Roseanne sequel series The Conners), then joined Roseanne Barr again in 1993 for the television film The Woman Who Loved Elvis, this time as the title character's daughter Priscilla Jackson. She appeared in an episode of Jack's Place the same year, portraying a teenage runaway. Also in 1993, Harris portrayed Gwenie in the film Free Willy, which had a US gross of $7,868,829 in its opening weekend, and went on to make $77,698,625 in the US and $153,698,625 worldwide. In 1994, she appeared on the drama series The Commish, playing the role of Sheri Fisher for one episode. The same year, Harris portrayed the main character's daughter Jessica in the television film Roseanne: An Unauthorized Biography, based upon her former co-star Roseanne Barr. She then guest starred in the sitcom Boy Meets World, as Theresa "T.K." Keiner.

In 1995, Harris learned that the producers of Halloween: The Curse of Michael Myers were looking for an actress over the age of 18 to play the role of Jamie Lloyd. Only 17 at the time, Harris got emancipated in order to participate, but was dissatisfied with the fate of the character in the script and the low salary offered. She abstained from reprising her role and was replaced by J. C. Brandy, although she can still be seen in The Producer's Cut of the film, which replays Halloween 5: The Revenge of Michael Myers's ending. Harris has since admitted to being glad she did not rejoin the series at this point, believing that this allowed her to make her later return in the 2007 remake of the original Halloween.

In 1996, Harris shared dual roles with Katherine Heigl for the television film Wish Upon a Star: Harris played Hayley Wheaton, a nerdy girl who switches bodies with her older, more popular sister Alexia (Heigl). Also in 1996, Harris starred in the films Shattered Image and Back to Back, and, the same year, had the role of young survivor Ashley Crighton in Daylight, the disaster film toplined by Sylvester Stallone. While Daylight has a 26% approval rating on Rotten Tomatoes and grossed $33 million in the United States, it took in over $126 million overseas, resulting in gross earnings of $159,212,469 worldwide. In 1997, Harris appeared in two episodes of the medical drama ER as Laura Quentin. In 1998, Harris had the lead role of Lulu in the film Dizzyland, where she portrayed a sexually abused teenager, and also appeared in an episode of Diagnosis: Murder. She then appeared in the popular slasher Urban Legend, her first horror film since her early Halloween credits. She portrayed Tosh, a goth girl who is murdered while her roommate Natalie (Alicia Witt) is resting on the other side of the room.

Beginning in 1998, Harris was among the main cast of Nickelodeon's animated children's series The Wild Thornberrys, chosen to voice Debbie Thornberry, the sister of a girl who can talk to animals. The protagonist, Eliza, travels the world with her family and uses her special ability to help the animals. The series lasted for five seasons, with a total of 91 episodes. It spawned several animated films early in the next decade, with its series finale airing in 2004. Harris would continue to make film and television appearances while doing The Wild Thornberrys: she portrayed a teenage witch named Aviva in a 1998 episode of Charmed, starred in the 1999 film Goosed as protagonist Charlene in her younger years, and appeared as Justine in the television film Hard Time: Hostage Hotel.

=== 2000s: Continued work and return to Halloween ===
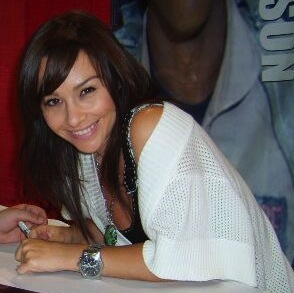
Harris signing autographs at the 2008 Adventure Con

Harris had a supporting role in the crime and comedy film Poor White Trash in 2000 and went on to star in the 2001 comedy Killer Bud. Between 2000 and 2002, Harris was a cast member of the series That's Life. Her character, Plum Wilkinson, featured in all but eight episodes and was involved in a romantic relationship with Kevin Dillon. Her animated series The Wild Thornberrys had spin-off movies in the early 2000s: the television film The Origin of Donnie from 2001 was followed by the 2002 theatrical release of The Wild Thornberrys Movie, which grossed $40,108,697 in the US, and a further film, Rugrats Go Wild, dealt with the Thornberrys meeting the characters from the popular series Rugrats. Released in 2003, it opened at #4 at the box office and grossed $39 million in the US, about the same as the Thornberrys Movie. Harris also appeared in an episode of The West Wing, had a supporting role as Leila in the 2003 television film The Partners and was in the theatrically released films Debating Robert Lee and Em & Me (both 2004). From 2004 to 2005, she was a main cast member of the animated sitcom Father of the Pride, appearing in all 14 episodes.

In January 2007, it was announced that Harris was cast as Annie Brackett in the remake of horror landmark Halloween. This marked Harris' first participation in the Halloween franchise since The Revenge of Michael Myers eighteen years prior. The remake, also called Halloween and directed by Rob Zombie, had Scout Taylor-Compton and Malcolm McDowell in main roles. Harris has revealed that Zombie wanted no one from previous Halloweens in the film, but, once she auditioned, he changed his mind. The film, which cost $15 million to make, opened at #1 at the box office and went on to gross $80,253,908 worldwide, becoming the highest-grossing Halloween in unadjusted U.S. dollars, which it remained as for more than a decade. Unlike in the original version, Annie Brackett survives, after Michael Myers (Tyler Mane) tries his hand at torture instead of killing her quickly. Annie encounters her attacker very much exposed, having undressed from the waist up, which marked Harris' first onscreen nudity. Harris admits that she refused the offers to cover her body while the cameras were not rolling, to better portray a vulnerable Annie against the monster. On facing Michael Myers once again and at the same time doing her first nude scene, she also commented:

I had a harder time emotionally with Rob Zombie's Halloween and H2 than I did when I was a kid. When I was a kid, it was totally fun and I didn't understand when I did Rob's Halloween, why it was so hard for me to shake it off. I'm like, "I'm an actress! Why am I getting a feeling like I want to cry? This is weird! I did enough crying when I was there [on set]. I don't know why I'm still feeling this way". I think it was because it was the first time I was ever physically touched by him. As a little girl, as Jamie, he never got me, ever. Now as an adult, I don't have my clothes on, doing scenes I've never done before as an actor, and I'm actually being attacked. Even though I should know the guy by now, it's still a weird thing that happens with your psyche I think.

Harris then began to appear in more horror productions and fantastic films. That same year, she starred in the also Halloween-themed Left for Dead. For Fearnet, she hosted Route 666: America's Scariest Home Haunts. 2009 saw her in a leading role in Blood Night: The Legend of Mary Hatchet, as Felicia Freeze in the comedic superhero adventure film Super Capers and alongside Robert Patrick in The Black Waters of Echo's Pond. Fear Clinic, a Fearnet original web series featuring Harris as well as veterans Robert Englund and Kane Hodder, made its debut the week of Halloween 2009. Also in 2009, Harris reprised her role of Annie Brackett in the sequel Halloween II. Halloween II was officially released on August 28, 2009, in North America, and was met with negative reception from most critics. On October 30, 2009, it was re-released in North America to coincide with the Halloween holiday weekend. The original opening of the film grossed less than that of the 2007 remake, with approximately $7 million. The film would go on to earn $33,392,973 in North America and $5,925,616 in foreign countries, giving Halloween II a worldwide total of $39,318,589.

=== 2010–present: Numerous horror films and directorial debut ===
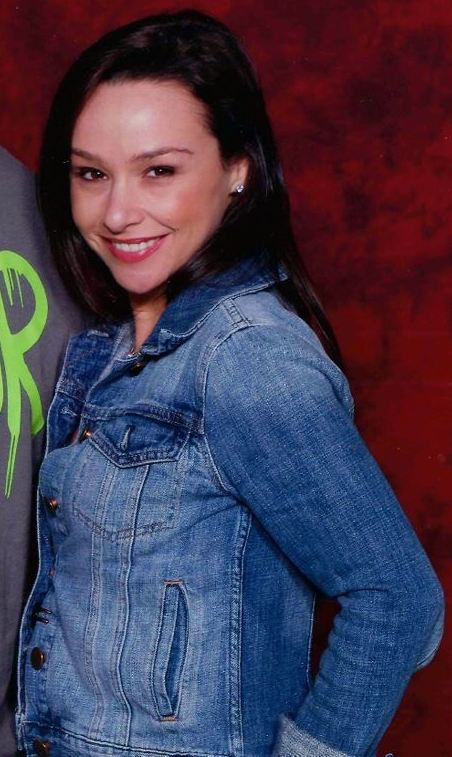
Harris in 2014

My career has not been easy for me. I feel like after everything I've done, I've kind of had to start over. I remember a couple of months ago... I found a Teen People magazine with me on the cover of "The New It Girls", and it was me, Jessica Biel, Scarlett Johansson and Kirsten Dunst. I was in that company at one point in my career – I had just done Daylight with Sylvester Stallone [in 1996]. And then somewhere along the line, I don't know what happened. It was not for a lack of trying – they got that one movie after that that really pushed them, and I feel like I'm always looking for that movie. I've just managed to barely hang in there by the skin of my teeth, but I think that's why I'm still working is because I've hung in there. With Rob Zombie bringing me back for Halloween, it's ironic that the same movie that started my career reinvented it again.

— Harris on becoming a "scream queen"

Harris continued to develop her "scream queen" identity with growing genre credits. She starred alongside Lance Henriksen, Bill Moseley, AFI's Davey Havok and Nicki Clyne in the illustrated film series Godkiller. Beginning with 2010's Hatchet II, Harris has taken over the leading role of Marybeth in the Hatchet series, after Tamara Feldman declined to reprise her character. Further genre credits include Jim Mickle's second feature film, the vampire/post-apocalyptic epic Stake Land, Cyrus: Mind of a Serial Killer, ChromeSkull, Havenhurst and Michael Biehn's The Victim, with lead roles in Shiver, See No Evil 2, Inoperable, Camp Cold Brook and others. She equally provided the voice and basis for an animated Barbara in Night of the Living Dead: Darkest Dawn, director Zebediah de Soto's prequel/re-telling of George A. Romero's 1968 original. Work in other types of films includes dramas like The Trouble with the Truth and Quentin Tarantino's Once Upon a Time in Hollywood. Harris made her directorial debut with the horror comedy Among Friends, in which she also has an appearance. The film, which was picked up for distribution by Lionsgate, was released on August 27, 2013.

Since the 2010s, Harris has had guest appearances in the television shows Psych (as a murder suspect), Bones (as a murder victim), as herself in Holliston and Naked Vegas, and also returned to voice Debbie Thornberry for a saucy Robot Chicken parody of The Wild Thornberrys, among others.

On April 3, 2022, Harris appeared as a guest for the 2022 Dead Meat Horror Awards along with other horror film stars such as Tony Todd, Bonnie Aarons, Ray Chase and Heather Langenkamp. In 2021, she started a podcast with longtime friend and Halloween co-star Scout Taylor-Compton called Talk Scary to Me, which can be heard on any podcast platform, with new episodes airing each Tuesday.

== Public image ==
Harris has been referred to as "horror's reigning scream queen" by the New York Daily News and various other outlets, and was called "the Natalie Portman of Horror" by director Sylvia Soska. She has provided the cover feature for such publications as Girls and Corpses, Gorezone magazine, Invasion magazine and Scream Sirens as well as a subject for the photo-book The Bloody Best Project, a collection of artistic pictures showcasing the celebrities of the horror film industry. Harris was also featured in Five Finger Death Punch's first music video, "The Bleeding", in 2007. In 2011, Harris won the Best Actress Award at the Shockfest Film Festival for her starring role in the short Nice Guys Finish Last. The 2012 Burbank International Film Festival gave Harris its Best Actress Award for her portrayal of literary heroine Wendy Alden in Shiver.

== Personal life ==
In 2013, Harris became engaged to David Gross. The couple married in a private ceremony in Holualoa, Hawaii, on January 4, 2014, and had a son in 2017. Their second son was born in late 2018.

=== Stalking incident ===
Harris was stalked in 1995 by an obsessed fan, Christopher Small, who wrote letters threatening to kill her. Small was later arrested after taking a teddy bear and a shotgun to her home. On January 29, 2007, Harris appeared on an episode of the Dr. Phil show, sharing her experience with other equally affected people. The stalker was obsessed with her character of Molly Tilden from the television series Roseanne. In October 2009, Harris was granted a restraining order against Small, who began sending her messages on Twitter.

== Filmography ==
=== Film ===
Film appearances by Danielle Harris
Year	Title	Role	Notes	Ref.
1988	Halloween 4: The Return of Michael Myers	Jamie Lloyd		
1989	Halloween 5: The Revenge of Michael Myers	Jamie Lloyd		
1990	Marked for Death	Tracey Hatcher		
1991	City Slickers	Classroom student	Cameo appearance	
1991	Don't Tell Mom the Babysitter's Dead	Melissa Crandell		
1991	The Last Boy Scout	Darian Hallenbeck		
1993	Free Willy	Gwenie		
1996	Back to Back	Chelsea Malone		
1996	Daylight	Ashley Crighton		
1998	Urban Legend	Tosh Guaneri		
1998	Dizzyland	Lulu	Short film	
1999	Goosed	Young Charlene Silver		
2000	Poor White Trash	Suzi		
2001	Killer Bud	Barbie		
2002	The Wild Thornberrys Movie	Debbie Thornberry	Voice role	
2003	Rugrats Go Wild	Debbie Thornberry	Voice role	
2004	Debating Robert Lee	Liz Bronner		
2004	Em & Me	Emily Davenport		
2005	Race You to the Bottom	Carla		
2007	Halloween	Annie Brackett		
2007	Left for Dead	Nancy Simmons		
2008	Super Capers	Felicia Freeze		
2008	Burying the Ex	Olivia	Short film	
2008	Madison	Sarah	Short film; also co-director	
2009	Halloween II	Annie Brackett		
2009	Blood Night: The Legend of Mary Hatchet	Alissa Giordano	Also associate producer	
2009	The Black Waters of Echo's Pond	Kathy		
2010	Godkiller	Halfpipe	Voice role	
2010	Cyrus: Mind of a Serial Killer	Maria Sanchez		
2010	Hatchet II	Marybeth Dunston		
2010	Stake Land	Belle		
2010	The Day I Told My Boyfriend	Belle	Stake Land companion short film	
2010	Willie	Director	Stake Land companion short film	
2011	The Victim	Mary		
2011	ChromeSkull: Laid to Rest 2	Spann		
2011	Nice Guys Finish Last	Kori	Short film	
2012	Shiver	Wendy Alden		
2012	The Trouble with the Truth	Jenny		
2012	Among Friends	Jamie Lloyd	Uncredited cameo appearance; also director	
2012	Fatal Call	Amy Hannison		
2012	Fade Into You	Woman	Short film	
2013	Hatchet III	Marybeth Dunston		
2013	Hallows' Eve	Nicole Bates		
2014	Camp Dread	Donlyn Eldridge		
2014	Ghost of Goodnight Lane	Chloe		
2014	The Town That Dreaded Sundown	Townsperson #2	Cameo appearance	
2014	See No Evil 2	Amy		
2015	Night of the Living Dead: Darkest Dawn	Barbara Todd	Voice role	
2016	Havenhurst	Danielle Hampton		
2017	Victor Crowley	Marybeth Dunston	Cameo appearance	
2017	Inoperable	Amy Barrett		
2018	Camp Cold Brook	Angela		
2018	Postpartum	Regan	Short film	
2019	Between the Darkness	Ranger Stella Woodhouse		
2019	Once Upon a Time in Hollywood	"Angel"		
2020	Stay Home	Herself	Short film	
2020	Redwood Massacre: Annihilation	Laura Dempsey		
2023	Natty Knocks	Diane Henderson	Also producer	
2023	Dark Obsession	Charlotte	Also producer	
2024	Roadkill	Allison		
2024	Project Dorothy	Dorothy	Voice role; also executive producer	
2024	Don't Tell Mom the Babysitter's Dead	Production Executive	Cameo appearance	
2024	Stream	Elaine Keenan		
2025	Dr. Gift	Kat		
2026	Marrow	Camilla Moore		
2026	Bring the Law	Laura		
2026	Last Chance Motel	Casey	Also co-director, co-writer, and co-producer	

=== Television ===
Television appearances by Danielle Harris
Year	Title	Role	Notes	Ref.
1985–1987	One Life to Live	Samantha "Sammi" Garretson	Unknown episodes	
1987	Spenser: For Hire	Tara	Episode: "Thanksgiving"	
1991	Don't Touch My Daughter	Dana Hemmings	Television film	
1991	The Killing Mind	Young Isobel Neiman	Television film	
1991	Eerie, Indiana	Melanie Monroe	Episode: "Heart on a Chain"	
1991	In Living Color	Anice	Episode: "The Jackson Bunch"	
1991	Growing Pains	Susie Maxwell	Episode: "The Big Fix"	
1992	1775	Abby Proctor	Unsold television pilot	
1992–1993	Roseanne	Molly Tilden	Recurring role (season 5); 7 episodes	
1993	The Woman Who Loved Elvis	Priscilla "Cilla" Jackson	Television film	
1993	Jack's Place	Jennifer	Episode: "True Love Ways"	
1994	The Commish	Sheri Fisher	Episode: "Romeo and Juliet"	
1994	Roseanne: An Unauthorized Biography	Jessica Pentland	Television film	
1994	Boy Meets World	Theresa "T.K." Keiner	Episode: "Sister Theresa"	
1996	Wish Upon a Star	Hayley Wheaton / Alexia Wheaton	Television film	
1997	High Incident	Tiffany	Episode: "Camino High"	
1997	ER	Laura Quentin	Episodes: "Something New" & "Friendly Fire"	
1997–1998	Brooklyn South	Willow Mortner	Episodes: "Clown Without Pity" & "Tears on My Willow"	
1998	Diagnosis: Murder	Noelle Andrew	Episode: "An Education in Murder"	
1998	Charmed	Aviva	Episode: "The Fourth Sister"	
1998–2004	The Wild Thornberrys	Debbie Thornberry	Voice role; 90 episodes	
1999	Hard Time: Hostage Hotel	Justine Sinclair	Television film	
2000–2002	That's Life	Plum Wilkinson	Main role; 29 episodes	
2001	The Wild Thornberrys: The Origin of Donnie	Debbie Thornberry	Voice role; television film	
2002	The West Wing	Kiki	Episode: "20 Hours in America"	
2003	The Partners	Leila	Television film	
2004–2005	Father of the Pride	Sierra	Voice role; 15 episodes	
2005	Cold Case	Gina Carroll	Episode: "Yo, Adrian"	
2007	Route 666: America's Scariest Home Haunts	Herself (host)	Television special	
2009	Fear Clinic	Susan	Web series; 5 episodes	
2010	Psych	Tonya	Episode: "Feet, Don't Kill Me Now"	
2011	Paranormal Challenge	Herself	Guest judge; Episode: "USS Hornet"	
2012	Nuclear Family	Zoe	Television film	
2012–2013	Holliston	Herself	Episodes: "Weekend of Horrors" & "Halloween Girl"	
2013	Bones	Rebecca Pearce	Episode: "The Maiden in the Mushrooms"	
2013	Halloween Wars	Herself	Guest judge; Episode: "Zombie Prom"	
2013	Hollywood Death Trip	Herself	Television special; co-host	
2013	Naked Vegas	Herself	Episode: "Paint the Town, Red"	
2013	Twisted Tales	Susan	Episode: "To Hell with You"	
2015	Robot Chicken	Debbie Thornberry / Positive Pig	Voice role; Episode: "Zeb and Kevin Erotic Hot Tub Canvas"	
2019	The Boulet Brothers' Dragula	Herself	Guest judge; Episode: "Halloween Haunt"	
2021	The Conners	Molly Tilden	Episode: "An Old Dog, New Tricks and a Ticket to Ride"	
2021	Creepshow	Marnie Wrightson	Voice role; Episode: "The Things in Oakwood's Past"	
2024	Killer Cakes	Herself	Guest judge; Episodes: "#1.1" & "#1.2"	

=== Video games ===
Year	Title	Voice role	Notes
2000	The Wild Thornberrys: Animal Adventures	Debbie Thornberry	
2000	The Wild Thornberrys: Rambler	Debbie Thornberry	Windows version only
2002	The Wild Thornberrys Movie	Debbie Thornberry	
2003	Rugrats Go Wild	Debbie Thornberry	Windows version only

=== Music videos ===
Year	Artist	Title	Role
2007	Five Finger Death Punch	"The Bleeding"	Ivan's girlfriend
2021	Psycho Synner	"Love You to Pieces"	
2021	Psycho Synner	"Creepy Crawlin' to Getcha"	
