= Mark Alan =

American actor

- Born: Mark Alan Brown; Lansing, MI
- Occupation(s): Actor, Producer, Executive
- Years active: 2000–present

Mark Alan is an American actor, producer and Vice President of Renfield Productions alongside director Joe Dante. He also co-produces the online franchise Trailers from Hell.

== Filmography ==
=== Film ===
Year	Title	Role
2014	Burying the Ex	Goth Bartender
2015	Magic Hour	Stan Fox
2012	Dark Amazon	Jay

=== TV ===
Year	Title	Role
2007	North Mission Road	Mike MacFarland
2009	Splatter	Mortis

=== Producer ===
Year	Title	Notes
2008	Trailers from Hell	Co-Producer
2015	Dark	Producer
2017	Camp Cold Brook	Producer

== Awards and nominations ==
Year	Award	Category	Result	Work	Notes
Idyllwild International Festival of Cinema	Best Actor	Taquitz Awards	Won	Splatter	
