= Splatter (web series) =

- Genre: Horror
- Written by: Richard Christian Matheson
- Directed by: Joe Dante
- Starring: Corey Feldman
- Country of origin: United States
- Original language: English

Original release
- Network: Netflix
- Release: 2009 – 2009

Splatter is a 2009 interactive short horror web series directed by Joe Dante produced by Roger Corman and starring Corey Feldman. It was created for Netflix.

The film aired over 3 parts on October 29, November 6 and 13, and was subsequently combined into a single 29 minute segment. In October 2019, the film website Trailers from Hell released all ten variations of the series, giving the viewer the option of whom to kill next. This is the first time every filmed episode of the series has ever been released to the public.

== Plot ==
After committing suicide, a washed-up rocker returns from the grave to torment the five people who betrayed him in life.

Audiences would get to vote which character lived and died.

== Cast ==
- Corey Feldman as Johnny Splatter
- Tony Todd as Spencer
- Mark Alan as Mortis
- Erin Way as Fiona
- Tara Leigh as Krule
- Stuart Pankin as Dr. Bellows

== Production ==
Netflix approached Roger Corman with the project.

They called me and said ‘Here’s what we’d like to do: three 10-to-15-minute segments of a horror story in which somebody is killed in the first segment and the audience votes on who they want to kill in the second. The second segment must be written, made, edited, and on the air one week later. Then the audience will vote again!’ I took the idea just because I thought it would be fun, that this is something new and an incredible challenge to do everything not in seven days but six, as we had to wait a day for the votes to come in on who was going to be killed.

Corman tried to hire Richard Matheson to write the script but he was busy and recommended his son, Richard Christian Matheson. The director was Joe Dante, with whom Corman had worked in the 1970s.

The series was shot over eight days at a mansion in the Hollywood Hills.

The original intention was to shoot the first installment and then wait a day for the audience votes to be tabulated before write, shoot, edited and post produce the next one over six days. “I wanted to see if I could do this stuff again,” said Corman, who had made feature films in such short time spans before. However he soon realized it would be too logistically difficult. His wife proposed a solution. "We would shoot the deaths of all five and then, as the votes come in, we may do a little pick-up shooting to tie things together,” Corman says. “Then we would edit the deaths in.”

“We have to have everything ready for when the first vote happens,” says Joe Dante. “When the first vote happens, we have to have a rough version of all of these different possibilities and the same thing for the third week. You have to shoot everything three times. There are all of these logistical issues you have to carry around in your head.”

Dante later recalled:

They [Netflix] wanted to get into video streaming, to show people that they could show films directly via the internet, without having to post films in boxes back and forth. Ours was their test case to prove that they could stream material successfully to people’s computers, and so they were partners on the series, but when time came to pick up the entire series for redistribution beyond its first screening, they only wanted the three episodes that appeared on their site, the ones the audience voted for – we owned the rights to the rest of them. I think if you go to the Netflix site, you can still see the three episodes that were run, but of course the series is designed so that those three episodes wouldn’t always be the same three that were run if it was aired again.

Dante says that making the film was challenging:

For example, in the script, there are several different versions of each scene, depending on who is currently still alive! When you shoot the scenes, you have to set them up where you can move one actor out and move another actor in and have them say the lines in that version of the script. So it becomes a kind of assembly line of changing actors. You shoot a master shot and then you shoot all three or five versions of however many characters there are. When you do the close-ups, the cast always have to be on call because even if they’ve been killed off, they have to survive in at least one version. It frankly can get a little wearying – you can get very easily confused as a director as to where you are in any given scene. When the writer, Richard C Matheson, wrote the original story, he didn’t account for every single possibility of transitions depending on where people were and whether they were existing or not… So it was quite a jigsaw puzzle to edit. It was a solvable problem, but it was not like any other film I’ve ever made, and I don’t think I’ve ever made a film as fast as this one! Even my first picture, which was made in 10 days, was a breeze compared to this, because it was so labour intensive.

There were ten episodes in all. "The first episode is always the same, and then the others vary depending on the audience vote," says Dante. "There are more versions again of the last episode than the middle. The exact details escape me, because I probably never quite understood them anyway!"
