= Shiver (2012 film) =

- Directed by: Julian Richards
- Screenplay by: Robert D. Weinbach
- Based on: Shiver by Brian Harper
- Produced by: Robert D. Weinbach
- Starring: Danielle Harris; John Jarratt; Casper Van Dien
- Cinematography: Zoran Popovic
- Edited by: Geoff Mastro; Mark Talbot-Butler
- Music by: Richard Band
- Release date: February 2012 (Fantasporto)
- Running time: 91 minutes
- Country: United States
- Language: English

Shiver is a 2012 American thriller film directed by Julian Richards, based on the 1992 novel of the same name by Brian Harper. The film stars Danielle Harris, John Jarratt and Casper Van Dien.

== Plot ==
Wendy Alden (Danielle Harris), a young secretary in Portland lacking in self- confidence becomes victim of a savage killer Franklin Rood (John Jarratt) who has claimed the lives of a number of other women. Somehow Wendy finds the resources of courage to fight back and escape.

== Cast ==
- Danielle Harris - Wendy Alden
- John Jarratt - Franklin Rood
- Casper Van Dien - Detective Delgado
- Rae Dawn Chong - Detective Burdine
- Brad Harris - The Captain
- Valerie Harper - Audrey Alden
- Lisa Foiles - Jennifer
- Laura Weinbach - Singer/Guitarist
- Anton Patzner - Violinist

== Production ==
The film was shot on location in Portland, Oregon.

== Release ==
The film screened at the Sitges Film Festival on October 5, 2012.
