= Route 666 =

Route 666 may refer to:

== Highways ==
=== Canada ===
- Alberta Highway 666
- Ontario Highway 666, renumbered to 658 in 1985

=== Ireland ===
- R666 road (Ireland)

=== United Kingdom ===
- A666 road

=== United States ===
- U.S. Route 666, renumbered in 2003 to U.S. Route 491
- Florida State Road 666
- County Route 666 (Atlantic County, New Jersey)
- Ohio State Route 666
- Pennsylvania Route 666

== Media ==
=== Comics ===
- Route 666 (comics), a 2002 comic book published by CrossGen Comics

=== Music ===
- Route 666 (Helltrain album), 2006
- Route 666 (The Iron Maiden album), 2007
- Route 666 (The Hamsters album), 1995
- "Route 666", a song by God Is an Astronaut from The End of the Beginning
- "Route 666", a song by The Comsat Angels from My Mind's Eye
- "Route 666", a song by BB Tone from Natural Born Killers
- "Route 666", a song by L'Arc-en-Ciel from Real
- "Hwy 666", a song by Corey Taylor from the 2022 album CMFT

=== Film and television ===
- Route 666 (film), a 2001 American horror film
- Route 666: America's Scariest Home Haunts, an Internet TV series
- "Route 666" (Married... with Children), an episode of Married... with Children
- "Route 666" (Supernatural), an episode of Supernatural
- "Route 666", a fictional funhouse ride in the 2004 film The Machinist

=== Video games ===
- Ride to Hell: Route 666, a cancelled digitally distributed spinoff of Ride to Hell: Retribution
