= The Redwood Massacre =

- Directed by: David Ryan Keith
- Written by: David Ryan Keith
- Produced by: David Ryan Keith; Lorraine Keith
- Starring: Lisa Cameron; Mark Wood; Lisa Livingstone; Rebecca Wilkie; Adam Coutts; Lee Hutcheon
- Cinematography: David Ryan Keith
- Edited by: David Ryan Keith
- Music by: Leah Kardos
- Production company: Clear Focus Movies
- Distributed by: Uncork’d Entertainment
- Release dates: 28 September 2014 (Chicago Horror Film Festival); 24 April 2015 (UK)
- Running time: 82 minutes
- Country: United Kingdom
- Language: English

The Redwood Massacre is a 2014 British slasher film directed by David Ryan Keith, starring Lisa Cameron, Mark Wood, Lisa Livingstone, Rebecca Wilkie, Adam Coutts and Lee Hutcheon. The film received a sequel in 2020, titled, Redwood Massacre: Annihilation.

== Plot ==
An evil maniac wearing a mask made of burlap kills a woman in the woods with an ax. In the light of day, a hunter finds blood at the scene before proceeding to follow two female hikers.

On the 20th anniversary of the infamous Redwood Massacre, Kirsty and her boyfriend Mark meet Mark’s ex-girlfriend Jessica and their friend Pamela in the woods to hike to the house at the murder site for a party. On his way to meet the foursome, fifth friend Bruce is attacked by the masked maniac and taken captive. Pamela becomes concerned that something may be amiss when she finds Bruce’s phone on the forest floor while looking for him.

Around a campfire that evening, Kirsty recounts the true story of what happened at Redwood. Supposedly, a farmer hearing voices in his head attacked and ate his wife alive before killing his two children with an ax and hanging himself. Legend says that the farmer’s evil allows him to return from the grave to attack anyone who disturbs the resting place of his family.

Mark and Jessica are kidnapped during the night and imprisoned alongside Bruce. While Mark and Bruce remain chained to a wall, the masked maniac takes Jessica to a separate room where he tortures her to death. When Mark is taken to be the next torture victim, Bruce manages to escape his restraints and arm himself with an ax, but is too afraid to attempt rescuing Mark. While looking for a way out of the lair, Bruce is eventually cornered by the killer and seemingly killed.

Unable to find Mark and Jessica when they wake at the campsite, Pamela and Kirsty hike to the remote house in the forest. After finding a dead fox inside the abandoned Redwood home, the two women separate. Kirsty encounters the maniac and is killed after a short chase.

Pamela stumbles upon the maniac carrying Kirsty’s body. While Pamela observes the killer silently from the shadows, the hunter finds her and warns Pamela about the supernatural maniac, who also killed his daughter. After the maniac chases and corners the two of them, the hunter gives Pamela his gun so that she can escape. The maniac then kills the hunter.

Pamela finds a room full of bound and bloodied victims, but is unable to help anyone. The maniac catches Pamela and beats her bloody until Bruce unexpectedly appears to provide a distraction. While the maniac murders Bruce, Pamela recovers the dropped gun and shoots the killer. She then flees to a nearby road where she is picked up by a passing motorist.

When the motorist becomes lost during the night, he exits the car only to be killed by the masked maniac. Pamela flees on foot to an auto graveyard where the final confrontation ends with her using heavy machinery to drop a car on the killer.

== Cast ==
- Lisa Cameron as Pamela
- Mark Wood as Bruce
- Lisa Livingstone as Kirsty
- Rebecca Wilkie as Jessica
- Adam Coutts as Mark
- Lee Hutcheon as Hunter

== Reception ==
The film received a rating of 4 out of 5 in Horror Society. Mark L. Miller of Ain't It Cool News wrote a positive review of the film, writing that "if you’re not the type to nitpick things like plot holes and lack of motivation, you’re bound to have a good time with this gory slasher yarn."

Jon Dickinson of Scream rated the film 2 stars out of 4, writing that "by placing focus on visuals the film lacks any ability to evoke an emotional response other than disgust which is a real shame". Ian Sedensky of Culture Crypt gave the film a score of 50 out of 100, calling it "one of those disposable movies where some short time after the fact, you’ll be unable to recall if you actually saw it or not." Matt Boiselle of Dread Central rated the film 2.5 stars out of 5, writing that "If it’s a color-by-numbers kill-a-thon that you’re after, then feel free to dive headfirst into The Redwood Massacre, but please stay in the shallow end, as the lifeguard is now off duty." Joel Harley of Nerdly rated the film 2 stars out of 5, writing that it "feels too long, annoys too frequently and is simply too unoriginal to whole-heartedly recommend".
