= Gregory Sporleder =

American actor

- Born: April 14, 1964 (age 62); St. Louis, Missouri, U.S.
- Occupations: Actor; director
- Years active: 1989–present
- Spouse: Megan Sporleder (m. 2001)
- Children: 2

Gregory Sporleder (born April 14, 1964) is an American actor and filmmaker, notable for playing military men in films such as The Rock, Black Hawk Down and Renaissance Man, as well as Calvin Norris in the HBO series True Blood.

== Early life ==
Sporleder graduated from University City High School in St. Louis, Missouri and was voted the top dancer in his class.

== Career ==
Sporleder got his first major role in the 1989 romance Say Anything... alongside John Cusack. In 1994, he appeared as "Billy" in the music video for Sheryl Crow's song "All I Wanna Do". He had supporting roles in films such as A League of Their Own, True Romance, 1998's quirky Uncorked and episodes of Murphy Brown, NYPD Blue and Smallville.

Sporleder also appeared in Being John Malkovich, Black Hawk Down, S.W.A.T., The Big Bounce, Hotel for Dogs, Andersonville and 17 Again. Sporleder landed the role of Calvin Norris in True Blood, the father of Crystal Norris. In 2014, he appeared on Criminal Minds as Sam Caplan.

In 2016, Sporleder participated in a documentary about the Missouri painter George Caleb Bingham, playing Bingham as an adult.

== Filmography ==
=== Film ===
Year	Title	Role	Notes
1989	Say Anything...	Howard	
1990	The Grifters	Sailor - Spooney	
1992	Roadside Prophets	Deputy	Credited as Greg 'Spoonie' Sporleder
1992	A League of Their Own	Mitch Swaley	
1992	Wild Blue Moon	Willie	
1993	Trouble Bound	Irwin	
1993	True Romance	Burger Stand Customer	
1993	Fatal Instinct	Court Clerk	
1994	Renaissance Man	Pvt. Melvin	
1995	Mind Ripper	Rob	
1996	Twister	Willie	
1996	The Rock	USMC Captain Frye	
1996	Skin & Bone	Habadasher	
1997	Men with Guns	Richard Lucas	
1997	The Fanatics	Johnny DelFino	
1998	I Woke Up Early the Day I Died	Loan Manager	
1998	At Sachem Farm	Tom	
1998	Clay Pigeons	Earl	
1999	Never Been Kissed	Coach Romano	
1999	Being John Malkovich	Drunk at Bar	
2000	G-Men from Hell	Cheetah Man	
2001	Wooly Boys	Deputy Sheriff Orville Spratt	
2001	Black Hawk Down	SGT Scott Galentine	
2003	S.W.A.T.	Robber #1	
2004	The Big Bounce	Frank Pizzarro	
2009	Hotel for Dogs	ACO Dooley	
2009	17 Again	Ohio Scout	
2010	The Crazies	Travis Quinn	

=== Television ===
Year	Title	Role	Notes
1992	1775	Bert	TV pilot
1992	On the Air	Sax Player	1 episode
1994	State of Emergency	Larry	Television film
1994	Murphy Brown	Tadeus	1 episode
1995	NYPD Blue	Edmond Burke	1 episode
1996	Andersonville	Dick Potter	Television film
1996	Chicago Hope	Bobby Trenkwada	1 episode
1997	Gun	The Sheriff	1 episode
1998	Friends	Larry	1 episode
1999	The Drew Carey Show	Wally	1 episode
1999	The Strip	Tucker Mudd	1 episode
2000	Fail Safe		Television film
2001	Dead Last	Rudy	1 episode
2002	Smallville	Kyle Tippet	1 episode
2002	24	Dave	1 episode
2003	Carnivàle	Father of Dead Body	1 episode
2005	Little House on the Prairie	Mr. Edwards	Miniseries, 6 episodes
2009	Monk	Kenneth Nichols	1 episode
2010	The Mentalist	Terence Badali	1 episode
2010	True Blood	Calvin Norris	Recurring role, 6 episodes
2011	Memphis Beat	Jeffrey Gibbs	1 episode
2011	American Horror Story	Peter McCormack	1 episode
2013	Sons of Anarchy	Pastor	1 episode
2014	Criminal Minds	Sam Caplan	1 episode
2015	Agent Carter	Otto Mink	1 episode
2017	Days of Our Lives	Lyle	1 episode
2022	Animal Kingdom	Joseph	1 episode
