= 1775 (TV pilot) =

- Title card
- Written by: Martin Rips and Joseph Staretski
- Directed by: David Trainer
- Starring: Ryan O'Neal; Lesley-Anne Down; Sarah Koskoff; Judith Jones; Danielle Harris; Gregory Sporleder; Adam West; Jeffrey Tambor
- Country of origin: United States
- No. of episodes: 1 (pilot)

Production
- Producer: Faye Oshima Belyeu
- Running time: 30 minutes

Original release
- Network: CBS
- Release: 5 September 1992

Seventeen Seventy Five is a 1992 pilot episode for a CBS situation comedy. Set in colonial Philadelphia during the run-up to the American Revolution, the series was to follow the exploits of innkeeper Jeremy Proctor and his family. The series was not picked up by CBS, but was broadcast as a special presentation once September 5, 1992.

A similar idea for a situation comedy was mentioned by Andrew Alexander in a commentary track for SCTV.

== Plot ==
Innkeeper Jeremy Proctor needs funds to send his daughters to a ball (which will hopefully lead to marrying one of them off). He thus tries to borrow the money from his brother-in-law, George Washington, but to no avail.

== Cast ==
- Ryan O'Neal - Jeremy Proctor
- Lesley-Anne Down - Annabelle Proctor
- Sarah Koskoff - Maude Proctor
- Judith Jones - Eliza Proctor
- Danielle Harris - Abby Proctor
- Gregory Sporleder - Bert
- Adam West - George Washington
- Jeffrey Tambor - Governor Massengill
