= The Wild Thornberrys =

American animated television series

- Genre: Adventure; Comedy; Nature
- Created by: Arlene Klasky; Gábor Csupó; Steve Pepoon; David Silverman; Stephen Sustarsic
- Developed by: Mark Palmer; Jeff Astrof; Mike Sikowitz
- Voices of: Lacey Chabert; Tom Kane; Danielle Harris; Jodi Carlisle; Tim Curry; Flea
- Composer: Drew Neumann
- Country of origin: United States
- Original language: English
- No. of seasons: 5
- No. of episodes: 91 (list of episodes)

Production
- Executive producers: Arlene Klasky; Gábor Csupó
- Producers: Christine Ferriter; Maureen Iser; Krist-Ann Pehrson; Sheila M. Anthony
- Running time: 23 minutes
- Production companies: Pepoon/Silverman/Sustarsic (uncredited); Klasky Csupo

Original release
- Network: Nickelodeon
- Release: September 1, 1998 – June 11, 2004

The Wild Thornberrys is an American animated television series created by Arlene Klasky, Gábor Csupó, Steve Pepoon, David Silverman, and Stephen Sustarsic for Nickelodeon. It was produced by Klasky Csupo.

The series portrays the zany hijinks of a family of nomadic wildlife documentary filmmakers known as the Thornberrys, which consist of the nature documentary television host Nigel, his wife and camera operator Marianne, their 16-year-old daughter Debbie, their younger daughter Eliza, their adopted son Donnie, and a chimpanzee named Darwin. The series focuses particularly on Eliza, who has a magical ability to communicate with animals. The Thornberry family travels to every continent and wildlife environment in the ComVee, a recreational vehicle equipped with safety mechanisms to handle any terrain or body of water, to document their journeys in detail. Episodes typically involve Eliza befriending an animal and subsequently finding herself in peril.

Originally pitched by Klasky Csupo as an adult animated sitcom for Fox, the series was then retooled as a family-friendly animated series for Nickelodeon and premiered on September 1, 1998, as the eleventh Nicktoon and the third overall produced by the studio following Rugrats and Aaahh!!! Real Monsters. It ran for 5 seasons containing 91 episodes in total, with the final episode airing on June 11, 2004.

The series' fourth season premiere, "The Origin of Donnie", is a television special focusing on Donnie Thornberry's life before he was adopted by the family. A feature film, The Wild Thornberrys Movie, in which Eliza embarks on a quest to save a cheetah cub from poachers, was theatrically released on December 20, 2002. Rugrats Go Wild, a crossover feature film with Rugrats, was released in theaters on June 13, 2003. Spin-off media include DVD releases and three video games.

== Plot ==
"This is me: Eliza Thornberry, part of your average family. I got a dad, a mom, and a sister. There is Donnie — we found him! And Darwin ... he found us. Oh yeah, about our house. It moves, 'cause we travel all over the world. You see, my dad hosts this nature show, and my mom shoots it. Okay, so we're not that average. And between you and me, something amazing happened ... and now I can talk to animals. It's really cool, but totally secret. And you know what? Life's never been the same."

— Eliza Thornberry's opening narration.

The series focuses on a family of documentary filmmakers known as the Thornberrys, famous for their televised wildlife studies, as they travel the world in the "Comvee", a large, amphibious, multifunctional overland motorhome which doubles as their base of operations. It primarily centers on the family's younger daughter Eliza, and her secret gift of being able to communicate with animals, which was bestowed upon her after having freed a shaman masquerading as a trapped warthog.

The gift enables her to talk to the Thornberrys' pet chimpanzee Darwin. Together, the pair frequently venture through the wilderness, befriending many species of wild animals along the way, and discern moral truths and lessons through either their experiences or a particular animal species's lifestyle; often this means simply assisting the creatures by which they become acquainted in their difficulties.

== Characters ==
The Wild Thornberrys, left to right, Nigel (bottom left), Marianne (with camera), Eliza (with glasses), Darwin (the chimpanzee), Donnie (with brown hair), and Debbie (sitting down, bored)

=== Main ===
- Elizabeth "Eliza" Thornberry (voiced by Lacey Chabert) is a nerdy 12-year-old girl and the youngest daughter of the Thornberrys. She has long red-orange hair that is usually worn parted in braided pigtails, and occasionally a ponytail, round eyeglasses, four big teeth connected by two braces, and freckles. She is able to communicate with animals, especially her chimpanzee sidekick Darwin. She must keep this gift secret or she will lose her powers (as revealed in the episode "Gift of Gab"). This happens in The Wild Thornberrys Movie when Eliza reluctantly tells two poachers her secret in order to save Debbie. However, after saving a herd of elephants from the same poachers later in the film, she is given her powers back. Despite her good intentions, she sometimes interferes with nature which causes more problems.
- Sir Nigel Archibald Thornberry KBE (voiced by Tim Curry) is Eliza, Debbie, and Donnie's father and Marianne's husband. He is also the son of Radcliffe (also voiced by Curry) and Cordelia Thornberry (Lynn Redgrave), an aristocratic British couple. Born in the U.K. and having attended Harrow School near London, he travels around the world with his own family making wildlife documentaries. He is eccentric, enthusiastic, and cheerful even in the face of danger, and is also known for his exaggerated facial features and love of kippers, which he offers frequently.
- Marianne Thornberry née Hunter (voiced by Jodi Carlisle) is Eliza, Debbie, and Donnie's American mother and Nigel's wife. She is the daughter of Frank (Ed Asner) and Sophie Hunter (Betty White). She is the director and camerawoman of the Thornberry documentaries, even willing to put herself in danger to capture a shot. She mentions that she attended the University of California, Berkeley as revealed in "Rebel Without a Trunk".
- Donald "Donnie" Michael Thornberry (voiced by Flea) is a feral boy adopted by the Thornberrys, who speaks mostly in gibberish and (as revealed in the 4-part TV film The Wild Thornberrys: The Origin of Donnie) was raised by an orangutan in Borneo after his parents, Michael and Lisa, who were old friends of the Thornberrys, were killed by poachers. Debbie is usually left taking care of Donnie and she is constantly trying to keep him in control. Donnie's age is 4, turning 5 in The Origin of Donnie.
- Deborah "Debbie" Thornberry (voiced by Danielle Harris) is a typical, and pretty and popular 16-year old teenage valley girl and Eliza's sister who nags her family, especially Eliza, during her adventures. After the events of the movie, she becomes the only family member to know about Eliza's power but is warned that she will be turned into a baboon if she ever tells anyone. Debbie dresses in 1990s clothing and has a long swept hairstyle. Unlike Eliza, Debbie does not like traveling and wants nothing more than to live in civilization and make friends with people her own age.
- Darwin (voiced by Tom Kane) is the Thornberrys' pet chimpanzee and Eliza's best friend. He usually wears a tank top with horizontal blue and white stripes (used to be Debbie's lucky tank top) and blue shorts. He speaks with a distinct, upper-class British accent. Although he is not too fond of Debbie, the two do share the same preference to living in civilization over the wilderness. He also acts as the voice of reason for Eliza whenever she tries to interfere in nature.

=== Recurring ===
- Kip O'Donnell (voiced by Keith Szarabajka) is a poacher and The Thornberrys’ sworn enemy who poaches and kidnaps animals with his partner Neil Biederman (voiced by Michael Jeter and replaced by Jerry Sroka). Whenever they are not poaching animals, they are conducting schemes to make easy money. They would eventually be apprehended by the authorities after causing an oil spill while attempting to steal oil from an oil tanker in the episode "You Otter Know". Kip always refers to Eliza as "The Thornberry Girl".
- Tyler Tucker (voiced by Jonathan Taylor Thomas) is Eliza and Debbie's cousin. He is Marianne and Nigel's nephew through Marianne's sister Nancy Tucker née Hunter. He is a year older than Eliza but acts more immaturely than Eliza does. He doesn't really understand the dangers of living in the wild. He's a know-it-all but generally has a good head on his shoulders, and he cares about his cousins Debbie, Eliza, and Donnie. His parents are Dennis (voiced by Martin Mull) and Nancy Tucker (voiced by Mary Kay Place).
- Shane G. (voiced by Christopher Masterson) is a pop superstar who travels with the Thornberry Family for five episodes while they are filming in Alaska. The Foundation orders Nigel and Marianne to take him with the family to promote Wildlife preservation among young people and Shane's fans. Both Eliza and Debbie gain a crush on him, however Debbie loses interest when Shane shows to have more similarities with Eliza than herself.
- Shaman Mnyambo (voiced by Kevin Michael Richardson) is a high shaman who granted Eliza the gift to talk to animals prior to the beginning of the series. Originally from a tribe that believed the spirits of humans and animals were joined together, Mnyambo nonetheless couldn't stand animals and was considered rude and careless by the rest of his tribe. After eating the highest shaman's prized sheep, he was turned into a warthog as punishment with the intention that he would never become human again, as the spell could only be broken if a human who truly cared saved him. In the flashback episode, "Gift of Gab", it is revealed that Eliza was the one who broke the spell after saving him from a trap; he subsequently granted her the gift to talk to animals as a reward. Shaman Mnyambo would later appear in The Wild Thornberrys Movie, where he helped guide Eliza and restored her ability to talk to animals after losing it.
- Santusa (voiced by Tia Texada) is a llama whom Eliza befriended in the Andes.
- Shango (voiced by Bradley Pierce) is an African elephant who Eliza first met.
- Phaedra (voiced by Jane Wiedlin) is a female African elephant who appears in the episode, "Forget Me Not", and who Eliza and Darwin were riding at the beginning of The Wild Thornberrys Movie.
- Zita (voiced by Andrea Thompson) is an African elephant who was Rebecca's daughter and the mother of Shango, from the episode, Forget Me Not.
- Mali (voiced by Christina Pickles) is an African elephant who was Zita's aunt and Phaedra's daughter, when Eliza helps her.
- Juka (voiced by Marquise Wilson) is the leader of the Maasai legend between his wise Grandfather Makai (voiced by Courtney B. Vance and replaced by Steve Harris)
- Ben (voiced by David Gallagher) is a friend of Eliza's that Debbie teases her for having a crush on.
- Franz Fensterkopt (voiced by Bronson Pinchot) is a documentary filmmaker who serves as a friendly rival to Nigel Thornberry.
- Dr. Jomo (voiced by Brock Peters) is a police officer who is a friend of Nigel Thornberry.
- Sri Mayasandra (voiced by Alan Henry Brown) is a scientist who had found Donnie in the TV special.
- Baru (voiced by Cara DeLizia) is a young proboscis monkey who helps Eliza get back to her family, and his father, Baduk (voiced by Dwight Schultz).
- Lugan (voiced by Maureen Quinn) is a baby orangutan who was in the TV special.
- Saiful (voiced by Pamela Adlon), which was in the TV special. Adlon also voiced Tano, a Cheetah Cub who Eliza tries to help find and who she, Darwin and Donnie help try to find his mother in the episode, "Cheetahs Never Prosper".
- Shi Shou (voiced by Dionne Quan) is a baby panda, and Mei-Mei (voiced by Bai Ling), a mother panda.
- Conal (voiced by Michael Gough) is a golden eagle, and his wife Brianag (voiced by Laraine Newman).

=== Guest stars ===
- Jeff Bennett as an officer in the episode "Vacant Lot".
- Jodi Benson as the Mother Cheetah in the episode "Cheetahs Never Prosper"
- Gregg Berger as Lemke, a Tasmanian devil in the episode "Pal Joey"; also voices a lion and a warthog in the episode "Flood Warning". A water buffalo and a doctor in the episode "The Dragon and the Professor".
- Bill Brochtrup as Collin, a Common dolphin who Eliza swam with in the episode, "Hello, Dolphin!".
- Georg Stanford Brown as Kito, the leader jaguar from the episode "Temple of Eliza".
- S. Scott Bullock as Snaga, a Tasmanian devil in the episode "Pal Joey"; also voices an African rock python and a forest hog
- Arthur Burghardt as Big Buffalo, an African buffalo from the episode "The Kung and I" and a rhinoceros from the Pilot episode.
- Bill Cobbs as the Chief in the episode "Dinner with Darwin".
- Danny Cooksey as Wanuug, a polar bear who appeared in "Polar Opposites".
- Jesse Corti as two crocodilians in the episode "Only Child".
- Chris Demetral as Mato, a Gray Wolf who appeared in the episode, "Pack of Thornberrys".
- Phyllis Diller as Samantha, a female tortoise who Eliza helped in "Two's Company".
- David Eccles as a hippopotamus in the episode "Matadi or Bust".
- Bill Fagerbakke as Dank, a black reindeer who appeared in "On the Right Track".
- Melissa Fahn as Katrina in "On the Right Track".
- Ron Fassler as Tak, a little rat who helped Eliza find the Bangaboo in "The Great Bangaboo".
- Jane Goodall as Herself, appears in the episode, "The Trouble with Darwin".
- Jess Harnell as a tortoise and a marsh deer in the episode "Vacant Lot".
- Estelle Harris as Iguana/Turtle from the episode "Eliza-cology".
- David Huddleston as a sea tortoise in the episode "Gold Fever".
- Marabina Jaimes as Raamba, a jaguar who Eliza helped out of the pit in the episode "Temple of Eliza".
- Rosslynn Taylor Jordan as a tapir in the episode "Vacant Lot".
- Tom Kenny as Joey, a baby Eastern grey kangaroo who Eliza babysits in "Pal Joey".
- Eartha Kitt and Sheryl Lee Ralph as the Lionesses in the episode "Flood Warning".
- Phil LaMarr, Jackie Harris and Paul Greenberg are Tuku, Pippo, Barno, the three mysterious prankster marmosets; also voices the Steamboat Captain in the episode "Matadi or Bust".
- Anne Lambton as Sheeba the eyepatch-wearing cat who helped Eliza find the Bangaboo in "The Great Bangaboo".
- Jeffrey Lincon as a jaguar cub in the episode "Temple of Eliza".
- William H. Macy as Skoot, a male reindeer who Eliza raced with in "On the Right Track".
- Andrea Martin as Mother Condor from the episode "Flight of the Donnie".
- Kelly McGillis as Winema, a leader Gray Wolf that appeared in the episode, "Pack of Thornberrys".
- Candi Milo as Emily, a female wombat from the episode, "Chew if by Sea"; also voices a capybara, a parrot, a civet cat, a mousedeer, and others.
- Robert Morse as Jake, a male tortoise who Eliza helped in "Two's Company".
- Peter Onorati as Pava, a leader Gray Wolf that appeared in the episode, "Pack of Thornberrys".
- Marion Ross as Rebecca, an African elephant whom Eliza saved in "Forget Me Not".
- David Ogden Stiers as Karroo, an Aye-aye from "Luck Be an Aye-aye".
- Cree Summer as Rosie, a "teenage" Asian elephant in "Rebel Without a Trunk".
- Russi Taylor as Igna in "On the Right Track".
- Susanna Voltaire as Anna in "On the Right Track".
- Erik Von Detten as an adolescent jaguar in the episode "Temple of Eliza".
- Sabrina Wiener as a jaguar cub in the episode "Temple of Eliza".
- Jimmie Wood as Bone the three-legged dog who helped Eliza find the Bangaboo in "The Great Bangaboo".

== Episodes ==
Season	Episodes	Originally released	
Season	Episodes	First released	Last released
Pilot		September 1, 1998	
1	20	September 1, 1998	April 1, 1999
2	37	August 16, 1999	March 27, 2000
3	20	September 12, 2000	May 10, 2001
4	6	August 18, 2001	June 1, 2002
5	8	February 3, 2003	June 11, 2004
Films		December 20, 2002	

== Production ==
The Wild Thornberrys was produced by Klasky Csupo. It was initially pitched as an adult animated sitcom under the name, Nigel Thornberry's Animal World, and was to be co-produced by 20th Century Fox Television for the Fox network, but it was ultimately rejected. It was then picked up by Nickelodeon under its own animation studio and was retooled as a family-oriented series with Nigel's youngest daughter Eliza (originally named Alex) being promoted to the main protagonist role. According to Eryk Casemiro, SVP of Creative Affairs at Klasky-Csupo Productions at the time of the series production, she was originally designed to look "quite frankly, very ugly" in order to contradict the stereotype that all young heroines are physically attractive. However, her design was later retooled to look "cuter" at the request of Nickelodeon. It premiered on September 1, 1998, and was the first Nicktoon to exclusively use 22-minute stories (episodes of other Nicktoons usually featured two 11-minute stories, using 22-minute stories on occasion).

The series was designed to have a focus on parents, after focus groups run by Klasky and Csupo uncovered that children were talking about the real struggles of the parent–child relationship; this was opposed to Nickelodeon's view of only featuring kids in children's programming. It was also designed with the potential of being used in science curriculums. To accomplish this, the production crew hired a specialist who did research on different regions of the world, different cultures, and different species of animals, all of which were provided to the writers to help them develop ideas for episodes.

== Broadcast ==
The show aired in reruns on "Nick on CBS" for two years from September 14, 2002, to March 6, 2004. The show aired on Nicktoonsters and CBBC in the United Kingdom.

== Home media ==
All five seasons were released on DVD in Region 1 by Amazon.com through its CreateSpace manufacture-on-demand service in 2010. Season 1 was released on June 24, 2010, and Seasons 2 through 5 were released on December 1, 2010.

CreateSpace Releases	Release Date	Discs	Episodes
Season 1	June 24, 2010	4	20
Season 2, Volume 1	December 1, 2010	5	13
Season 2, Volume 2	December 1, 2010	5	24
Season 3, Volume 1	December 1, 2010	3	N/A
Season 3, Volume 2	December 1, 2010	3	N/A
Season 3, Volume 3	December 1, 2010	3	N/A
Season 4	December 1, 2010	2	6
Season 5	December 1, 2010	2	8

On February 16, 2011, Shout! Factory announced that it had acquired the rights to release the series alongside several other classic Nickelodeon shows on home media. Season 1 was released on May 17, 2011, followed by Season 2, Part 1 on November 8, 2011. Season 2, Part 2 was released on April 24, 2012. Season 2, Part 3 was released on January 15, 2013, as a Shout Select title. Season 3 was released on June 11, 2013, as a Shout Select title. Season 4 and Season 5 were released in a box set on September 10, 2013, as a Shout Select title.

On December 1, 2015, Shout! Factory released The Wild Thornberrys: The Complete Series on DVD in Region 1.

In Australia, all 5 seasons have been released via Beyond Home Entertainment. A 13-disc set titled The Wild Thornberrys: The Essential Episodes was released on June 3, 2015.

DVD Name	Episodes	Release Date	
DVD Name	Episodes	Region 1	Region 4
Season 1	20	May 17, 2011	April 3, 2013
Season 2, Part 1 Season 2, Part 2 Season 2, Part 3♦	13; 8; 16	November 8, 2011; April 24, 2012; January 15, 2013	April 3, 2013 (complete)
Season 3♦	20	June 11, 2013	December 4, 2013
Seasons 4 & 5♦	14	September 10, 2013	April 2, 2014
The Essential Episodes	75	N/A	June 3, 2015
The Complete Series	91	December 1, 2015	N/A

♦ – Shout! Factory select title, sold exclusively through Shout's online store. (refers to region 1 releases)

== Films ==
The franchise was extended through three movies (one television film and two theatrical films), which were released toward the end of the series' run:

- The Origin of Donnie (2001): This television film prequel discovers Donnie's life before he was found by the Thornberrys.
- The Wild Thornberrys Movie (2002): This theatrical film earned an Academy Award nomination for Best Original Song.
- Rugrats Go Wild (2003): This theatrical film was also the final Rugrats film, and a crossover between Rugrats and The Wild Thornberrys.

== Video games ==
A video game based on the television series titled The Wild Thornberrys: Animal Adventures was released only for PlayStation on November 8, 2000. During this time, another game was released, The Wild Thornberrys: Rambler on PC and Game Boy Color on August 7, 2000, and November 2000 respectively. The Wild Thornberrys Chimp Chase was released only for the Game Boy Advance on October 1, 2001. Characters from the series also appear in the Nickelodeon crossover games Nicktoons Racing, Nickelodeon Party Blast, Nicktoons: Freeze Frame Frenzy, Nickelodeon All-Star Brawl and its sequel (where Nigel is voiced by Jim Meskimen), and Nickelodeon Extreme Tennis.

== Reception ==
=== Box office performance ===
Film	Release date	Box office gross			Box office ranking		Budget	Ref.
Film	Release date	North America	Other territories	Worldwide	All time North America opening weekend	All time North America	Budget	Ref.
The Wild Thornberrys Movie	December 20, 2002	$40,108,697	$20,586,040	$60,694,737	2,867	2,049	$25,000,000	
Rugrats Go Wild	June 13, 2003	$39,402,572	$16,002,494	$55,405,066	1,774	2,081	$25,000,000	
Total		$79,511,269	$36,588,534	$116,099,803			$50,000,000	
List indicator: A dark grey cell indicates the information is not available for the film.

=== Critical response ===
Common Sense Media gave the series a rating of 5 stars, praising it for its ability to encourage young viewers to be empathetic toward animals, to want to find out about other cultures and ways of life, and to understand the vastness and diversity of the world. Knight Ridder called the series "sympathetic". The Native Voice complimented the series on its commitment to fun, adventure, detail, accuracy, and honesty.

Film	Rotten Tomatoes	Metacritic	CinemaScore
The Wild Thornberrys Movie	80% (88 reviews)	69 (25 reviews)	A
Rugrats Go Wild	40% (88 reviews)	38 (27 reviews)	A−

=== Accolades ===
Year	Nominee / work	Award	Result
1999	Casting Society of America Artios Award for Best Casting for Animated Voiceover	Barbara Wright	Nominated
1999	Young Artist Award for Best Performance in a Voice Over in a Feature or TV - Best Young Actress	Sabrina Wiener	Nominated
2000	Casting Society of America Artios Award for Best Casting for Animated Voiceover - Television	Barbara Wright	Nominated
2000	Environmental Media Award for Children's Animated	The Wild Thornberrys episode "You Otter Know"	Won
2000	Genesis Award for Television - Children's Programming - Animated	The Wild Thornberrys episode "Hunting by Numbers"	Won
2000	YoungStar Award for Best Young Voice Over Talent	Lacey Chabert	Nominated
2001	Burbank International Children's Film Festival Award for Best Tele-Feature Animation	Joseph Scott, Dean Criswell, and Ron Noble for "The Origin Of Donnie"	Won
2001	Daytime Emmy Award for Outstanding Children's Animated Program	The Wild Thornberrys	Nominated
2001	Environmental Media Award for Children's Animated Category	The Wild Thornberrys episode "Happy Campers"	Nominated
2001	Genesis Award for Television - Children's Programming - Animated	The Wild Thornberrys for multiple episodes	Won
2001	Genesis Award for Television - Children's Programming - Animated	The Wild Thornberrys episode "Forget Me Not"	Won
2002	Environmental Media Award for Children's Animated Category	The Wild Thornberrys episode "The Trouble With Darwin"	Won
2003	Casting Society of America Artios Award for Best Casting for Animated Voice Over, Television	Barbara Wright	Nominated
2004	NAMIC Vision Award in Children's Category	The Wild Thornberrys	Nominated
