= Burying the Ex =

2014 film by Joe Dante

- Theatrical release poster
- Directed by: Joe Dante
- Written by: Alan Trezza
- Produced by: Carl Effenson; Kyle Tekiela; Frankie Lindquist; Mary Cybriwsky; Alan Trezza; David Johnson
- Starring: Anton Yelchin; Ashley Greene; Alexandra Daddario; Oliver Cooper
- Cinematography: Jonathan Hall
- Edited by: Marshall Harvey
- Music by: Joseph LoDuca
- Production companies: Voltage Pictures; Elevated Productions; Act 4 Entertainment; Scooty Woop Entertainment; ArtImage Entertainment
- Distributed by: Image Entertainment
- Release dates: September 4, 2014 (Venice); June 19, 2015 (United States)
- Running time: 90 minutes
- Country: United States
- Language: English
- Box office: $604,517

Burying the Ex is a 2014 American zombie comedy film directed by Joe Dante and written by Alan Trezza, starring Anton Yelchin, Ashley Greene, Alexandra Daddario and Oliver Cooper. It screened out of competition at the 71st Venice International Film Festival, and was released on June 19, 2015, by Image Entertainment.

== Plot ==
Nice guy and horror fanatic Max is dating the beautiful but manipulative Evelyn. Evelyn is an extreme environmentalist working for a blog company that promotes "going green", while Max works a dead-end job at the local horror memorabilia shop, with dreams to open his own, much to Evelyn's dismay. Max often finds himself trapped trying to do whatever he can to keep Evelyn happy, including changing his diet and selling his old car. One day at the shop, Max unloads the latest shipments and finds a Satan Genie, an object that claims it can grant anyone's wants or desires. Believing it to just be another silly item for the shop, Max places it on the shelf in the storage room and dismisses it.

Later that night, he and Evelyn have sex in the shop and make a promise to each other that they'll be together forever. Shortly thereafter, Max has Evelyn move in with him. Max and Evelyn initially decide to celebrate this new step in their relationship by grabbing a bite to eat. Wanting Evelyn to try something he enjoys for a change, Max suggests they go to a horror-themed ice cream shop run by the kindhearted Olivia. Evelyn is immediately rude to Olivia, believing her and Max were flirting with each other. As Max pleads his case to her, Evelyn tearfully admits that she doesn't want to lose him and that he is the only thing in her life that has made her happy since her mother's death.

All seems to be great until Max comes back home to discover that Evelyn has redecorated their apartment to what she finds aesthetically pleasing and has haphazardly put away all of Max's collectibles and posters, eradicating their resale value. This leads to an argument where Max states that he and Evelyn should be making decisions together instead of her taking the reins on every little thing. Feeling that Evelyn's overbearing nature will lead him to be unhappy for the duration of their relationship, Max plans to break up with her but is too scared to do so. Max turns to his slacker half-brother Travis for advice. Travis suggests that Max break up with Evelyn in a public place so he can make a quick getaway and have everyone present see her for the control freak she truly is. However, the plan backfires when Evelyn accidentally gets hit by a bus on her way to the park. She dies in the middle of the road while in the arms of a tearful Max.

A couple of weeks pass and Max has shut himself off emotionally, feeling responsible for Evelyn's death. Travis swings by his place and, after seeing the funk he is in, encourages him to get back out and move on. Max eventually runs into Olivia again and starts to hit it off with her. As the night progresses, Max and Olivia learn that they both share the same fascination for horror. But when Max and Olivia visit the Hollywood Forever Cemetery, Evelyn is shown to have risen up from the dead and has dug herself out of the ground. After Olivia walks Max back home, he is quickly greeted by an undead Evelyn at the door. Evelyn is overjoyed and believes hers and Max's love is being given a second chance and thinks they're still dating. Frightened, Max realizes that the Satan Genie from the shop made their wish of being "together forever" come true and that it has brought Evelyn back from the dead. Still wanting to pursue Olivia, Max actively attempts to hide Evelyn from her. He is also left to ponder how exactly he is going to officially dump Evelyn. Max presumes that the answer to his problems lie with the Satan Genie, only to have it shatter on the ground when he loses his footing. For his backup plan, Max then researches the occult/spell books the shop has available in the hopes of finding something that will send Evelyn back to her grave. He tries these techniques, but to no avail; as they have no effect on Evelyn whatsoever.

Travis stumbles upon Max with a drunken Evelyn, and is reluctant to help him. He soon has a change of heart and tells Max that the only true way he can get rid of Evelyn is to decapitate her with a machete. Max tries to accomplish this but backs out at the last minute. The day before Halloween, Olivia drops by the shop to visit Max. It's later interrupted by a phone call from Evelyn. Olivia, who still doesn't know that Evelyn's a zombie, thinks Max hasn't gotten over her yet, but offers him an invitation to a screening of Night of the Living Dead at the cemetery. Travis steps up to the plate and offers to kill Evelyn so Max can meet Olivia at the movie. Travis shows up at the apartment under the guise of searching for an old DVD Max never returned and intentionally prolongs his stay, annoying Evelyn. She then develops a sudden craving for brains and ends up eating Travis. Meanwhile, Max and Olivia are enjoying each other's company and end up having sex in the back of Olivia's car.

Upon Max's return, he discovers Travis's corpse in the living room. Knowing that Evelyn is now determined to kill anyone who gets in her way, Max tricks her into drawing a hot bubble bath for themselves in order to barricade the bathroom door and trap her inside. He rushes out of the apartment to get the police but leaves his cell phone behind by mistake. Evelyn wastes no time breaking free and escapes. She then kidnaps Olivia after reading the texts between her and Max. Having had no luck with the police, Max hears through one of the police scanners about someone knocking over a malt shop and realizes Olivia's in trouble. Back at the apartment, Max sees Olivia tied up and Evelyn threatens to kill her. A battle ensues between Max, Evelyn, and Olivia, ending with Travis (now revealed to be a zombie himself) fatally stabbing Evelyn through the chest with the machete. With Evelyn finally gone, Max and Olivia take her body back to the cemetery and bury her.

One year later, Max has become business partners with Olivia, joining his horror memorabilia store and her ice cream shop as an enterprise of their own, and is now truly happy. He surprises Olivia with an engagement ring, which she gladly accepts. Travis, still in his zombie form, is shown sign-spinning outside the shop.

== Cast ==
- Anton Yelchin as Max
- Ashley Greene as Evelyn
- Alexandra Daddario as Olivia
- Oliver Cooper as Travis
- Archie Hahn as Chuck
- Mark Alan as Goth Bartender
- Gabrielle Christian as Coco
- Mindy Robinson as Mindy
- Dick Miller as Grumpy Cop, this was his final film with Dante before his death in 2019, Miller had appeared in at least a cameo role in most of Dante's previous films.

== Production ==
Burying the Ex was originally produced as a 15-minute short in 2008, written and directed by Alan Trezza. It starred Danielle Harris as Olivia and Mircea Monroe as Evelyn, with the male lead (then named Zak) played by John Francis Daley. Trezza later expanded the short into a feature film script. According to an interview with director Joe Dante in 2014:

I met Alan several years ago, got the script for the feature, which was not substantially different from the one we shot. I thought it was funny and different. Cut forward five years. Unexpectedly, after another project fell through, money appeared so we could make the movie, but we had to shoot cheaply and quickly. We shot in 20 days and it was a lot of fun, a hectic shoot, but there was a lot to do. We were clever about our locations and shooting all within the same area of town. ... The four leads are really fun and creative and brought a lot to the table.

Principal photography began November 17, 2013 and ended December 19, 2013. Mary Woronov played the owner of a store called Bloody Mary's. However, she was cut out of the film. Dante said the film was "very EC Comics, but it's not a comic book movie, I think the characters are a little bit more real. ... I was left alone in terms of creativity." He added that the film was made for his fans.

== Release ==
In January 2015, Image Entertainment acquired the release rights of the film, and set the release of the film in the United States, to summer 2015 via video on demand. The film was released on June 19, 2015, with the official trailer being released on May 26.

== Reception ==
On Rotten Tomatoes, the film has an approval rating of 30%, based on 40 reviews, with an average rating of 4.38/10. The critics' consensus reads: "Burying the Ex boasts flickers of director Joe Dante's former flair, but neither the concept nor its execution live up to the standard set by his best efforts." On Metacritic, the film has a score of 37 out of 100, based on 19 critics, indicating "generally unfavorable" reviews.
