= Redwood Massacre: Annihilation =

- Directed by: David Ryan Keith
- Written by: David Ryan Keith
- Produced by: Stephen Durham; Eric Easley; HemDee Kiwanuka
- Starring: Danielle Harris; Damien Puckler; Gary Kasper; Jon Campling; Tevy Poe; Benjamin Selway; Stephanie Lynn Styles
- Cinematography: David Ryan Keith
- Edited by: David Ryan Keith
- Music by: Drew Denton
- Production companies: 2nd Nature Films; Clear Focus Movies
- Distributed by: Uncork'd Entertainment
- Release date: 20 October 2020
- Running time: 85 minutes
- Country: United States
- Language: English

Redwood Massacre: Annihilation is a 2020 American slasher film directed by David Ryan Keith, starring Danielle Harris, Damien Puckler, Gary Kasper, Jon Campling, Tevy Poe, Benjamin Selway and Stephanie Lynn Stylesk. It is a sequel to The Redwood Massacre.

== Cast ==
- Danielle Harris as Laura Dempsey
- Damien Puckler as Max
- Gary Kasper as Gus
- Jon Campling as Tom Dempsey
- Tevy Poe as Jen
- Benjamin Selway as Burlap Killer
- Stephanie Lynn Styles as Donna
- Lisa Cameron as Pamela

== Release ==
The film was released to VOD and DVD on 20 October 2020.

== Reception ==
Film critic Kim Newman wrote: "The settings are good, the effects are above average, and the actors mostly do what they can – but this is resolutely minor fare, and (length apart) among the least ambitious British horror films of recent years."

Bobby LePire of Film Threat praised the film's cast, practical effects and score, but criticized the plot and ending.

Sean Only of Starburst wrote that Keith "seems to have no idea how to script dramatic, coherent or even human-sounding dialogue, and some of the character choices and plot points often seem either baffling or like borderline continuity errors." Only praised the performances of Harris, Puckler and Selway, but wrote that the film is "so bogged down with incredibly amateurish performances that their efforts feel futile."

Doug Rice of WWNY-TV rated the film 1 star out of 5 and wrote that it "takes itself way too seriously" and "becomes a paint-by-numbers rehash of countless horror films with seemingly comparable plots that lead to the inevitable encounter with said killer." Rice also criticised the performances, the "bland" killer and the "uninspired and boring" kills.
