= Camp Cold Brook =

- Directed by: Andy Palmer
- Written by: Alex Carl
- Produced by: Joe Dante
- Starring: Danielle Harris; Chad Michael Murray
- Cinematography: Filip Vandewal
- Music by: Chad Rehmann
- Release date: August 25, 2018 (HorrorHound Film Festival)

Camp Cold Brook is an American supernatural horror film directed by Andy Palmer. The film, which is produced by Joe Dante, stars Danielle Harris and Chad Michael Murray.

== Plot ==
A paranormal team sets to check out the abandoned Camp Cold Brook where a mass murder had taken place decades previous.

== Cast ==
- Danielle Harris as Angela
- Chad Michael Murray as Jack
- Courtney Gains as John Brierwitz
- Candice De Visser as Emma
- Michael Eric Reid as Kevin
- Cate Jones as Waitress
- Juliette Kida as Receptionist
- Loren Ledesma as Connie
- Jason Van Eman as O'Connor
- Katie Fairbanks as Hatchet Face Girl
- Mary Kathryn Bryant as Anise Bernadeau
- Maddie Perry as Girl
- Jacob Dever as Young Jack
- Corbin Tyler as Masked Boy
- Mary Buss as Esther (as Mary Fjelstad-Buss)
- Debbi Tucker as Church parishioner
- Samantha Lee as lead camp counselor
- Lauren Hemm as Ghost Girl #6
- Emma Dennin as Camper
- Spivey as BigDaddyKane III

== Production ==
Principal photography started in July 2017 and wrapped in August 2017 in Oklahoma.

== Reception ==
Rotten Tomatoes gave this film a 57% rating based on seven critic reviews.
