= Naked Vegas =

2013 television series

- Genre: reality television
- Directed by: Ryan Powers
- Starring: Kelly "Red" Belmonte
- Country of origin: United States
- Original language: English
- No. of seasons: 1
- No. of episodes: 6

Production
- Production location: Las Vegas
- Running time: 60 min.

Original release
- Network: Syfy
- Release: October 29 – December 3, 2013

Naked Vegas is an American reality show about a body painting business owned by Red Belmonte in Las Vegas, Nevada.

== Cast ==
- Kelly "Red" Belmonte
- Nix Herrera
- Heather Aguilera
- Suzanne Lugano
- Wiser Oner
- Drew Marvick
- Dan Madonia

== Episodes ==
1. "Paint the Town, Red"
2. "Devil Pirates and Aliens"
3. "Penn & Teller Painted Magic"
4. "Painted Playmate Claire Sinclair"
5. "Cosplay and Steampunk"
6. "Jabbawockeez Masked in Color"

== Reception ==
- Las Vegas Review Journal
- Variety
