= Michael Prescott =

American novelist (born 1960)

- Born: Douglas Child Borton, Jr. 1960 (age 65–66); New Jersey, United States
- Education: Wesleyan University
- Occupations: Novelist, 1986–present
- Writing career
- Pen name: Douglas Borton; Brian Harper; Michael Prescott; Owen Fusterbuster
- Genre: Crime fiction
- Website: michaelprescott.org

Michael Prescott (born 1960, as Douglas Child Borton Jr.) is a contemporary American, New York Times bestselling writer of crime fiction.

== Early life ==
Douglas Child Borton Jr. was born to Doris Ann (née Kleen) Borton and Douglas Child Borton Sr., and grew up in New Jersey and attended Ranney School. He graduated from Wesleyan University in 1980, where he majored in Film Studies.

== Career ==
Prescott moved to Los Angeles in 1981, and there he worked as a freelance magazine article writer, archival researcher, editor, and wrote scripts for independent film producers. In 1986, he sold his first novel, which was in the horror genre. In 1992, under the pseudonym Brian Harper, he switched to crime and suspense novels, most of which are set in Los Angeles or in Arizona. He has contributed short stories to several anthologies.

== Bibliography ==
=== Written as Douglas Borton ===
1. Kane (1990)

=== Written as Brian Harper ===
1. Shiver (1992)
2. Shudder (1994)
3. Shatter (1995)
4. Deadly Pursuit (1995)
5. Blind Pursuit (1997)
6. Mortal Pursuit (1998)

=== Written as Michael Prescott ===
1. Comes the Dark (1999)
2. Stealing Faces (1999)
3. The Shadow Hunter (2000)
  (German version: Die Stalkerjägerin, Translator: Olaf Knechten, 2014)
4. Last Breath (2002)
5. Next Victim (2002)
6. In Dark Places (2004)
7. Dangerous Games (2005)
8. Mortal Faults (2006)
9. Final Sins (2007)
10. Riptide (2010)
11. Grave of Angels (2012)

=== Written as Owen Fusterbuster ===
1. Die Stupid (2011)
