= VEB Film Leipzig =

German music label

VEB FILM Leipzig is a netlabel, primarily known for producing straight to internet movies. All content is published under a creative commons license and can be copied, changed, and used for third party commercial purposes.

== Route 66 ==
Their debut film Route 66 – An American (bad) Dream was released for download in December 2004. Three Germans from Saxony make their way from the East to the West Coast of the United States in an old Cadillac. The tour is planned as a holiday road trip but right from the start the ramschackle Caddy forces them to look for help. These frequent repair stops land them with strangers in all sorts of unusual circumstances. After 100 minutes of film, the three finally arrive in San Diego.

The road movie was filmed by the protagonists themselves in May 2002. As described in the associated book it was filmed without the use of a script. Influences from “gonzo journalism” have since been seen in all VEB FILM productions. “Route 66” was released on the vebfilm.net website and distributed with filesharing technologies, direct downloads and, according to the label, on 600.000 DVDs in several magazines. The soundtrack from valleyforge was released separately under Creative Commons BY-NC-SA license. A remix album by German artists “klangpool” appeared in 2005.

The movie was praised as "world's first Open Source film" but also described as Open Sauce using the label open source simply as a PR trick.

== The Last Drug ==
Another full-length movie production has been announced for release in 2010. The concept will be similar, the story revolves around another trip by three friends searching for a rare hallucinogen in the wilds of South America. Other than “Route 66,” this movie will feature additional fictional elements filmed in Germany with a budget of €300.000. The original footage and project files have been announced to be released under Creative Commons BY-SA in distribution packages compiled for different types of reuse: for VJs, documentary filmmakers, translations and for remixing of the film itself. Several composers have been working on different scores for the release of multiple sound design versions of the movie.

== Marketing ==
VEB FILM Leipzig has gained significant popularity as a result of an intensive online marketing campaign. According to the label the first film, Route 66 is estimated to have reached an audience of over one million viewers. The founder and driving force behind the labels Free Culture ideology Stefan Kluge frequently represents the label on events related to open source, Net Culture and Digital Culture in Germany and Switzerland.
