= List of The Wild Thornberrys episodes =

The Wild Thornberrys is an American animated television series created by Arlene Klasky, Gábor Csupó, Steve Pepoon, David Silverman, and Stephen Sustarsic and produced by Klasky Csupo for Nickelodeon. The show focuses on the Thornberrys, a family of nature documentarians headed by Nigel Thornberry, a British filmmaker, and his wife, camera operator Marianne. Their daughters, Debbie and Eliza, join them in their quest to research animals in their natural habitats across the world. The Thornberrys travel around the world in the ComVee, a recreational vehicle equipped with survival gear, which also serves as the Thornberry home while they are on an expedition. Their travel companions also include Donnie, a feral boy whom the Thornberrys adopted, and Darwin, a skittish chimpanzee. Eliza, the younger of the two sisters, has a magical ability to communicate with animals, the origin of which is explained in the season 2 episode "Gift of Gab".

The series premiered on September 1, 1998, and ran for 5 seasons with 91 episodes. The series finale aired on June 11, 2004. Unlike typical Nickelodeon series of the time, each episode is a full half-hour in length (22 minutes if not counting commercials). Along with the feature film The Wild Thornberrys Movie, the characters have also been featured in Rugrats Go Wild, a feature film crossover with another Klasky Csupo production, Rugrats.

== Series overview ==
Season	Episodes	Originally released	
Season	Episodes	First released	Last released
Pilot		September 1, 1998	
1	20	September 1, 1998	April 1, 1999
2	37	August 16, 1999	March 27, 2000
3	20	September 12, 2000	May 10, 2001
4	6	August 18, 2001	June 1, 2002
5	8	February 3, 2003	June 11, 2004
Films		December 20, 2002	

== Episodes ==
=== Pilot (1998) ===
Title	Directed by	Written by	Location setting	Original release date
"Pilot"	Jeff McGrath & Cathy Malkasian	Mark Palmer	Kenya	September 1, 1998
The Thornberrys get word that the only way to save the funding for their show is to film a segment about the black rhino. Eliza, Darwin and Donnie find it, but Donnie bites the rhino's tail and causes it to charge. This episode was only included in the VHS release, and is not available on DVD.

=== Season 1 (1998–99) ===
No. overall	No. in season	Title	Directed by	Written by	Location setting	Original release date	Prod. code	Viewers (millions)
1	1	"Flood Warning"	Steve Ressel	Tom Stern	Mount Kilimanjaro, Tanzania	September 1, 1998	003	2.17 (HH) (Note: (HH) represents the amount of households the episode was viewed in when it premiered.)
The Thornberrys are in East Africa near Mount Kilimanjaro to film lions. Debbie pleads with her mom to let her drive the Commvee while she films, and Marianne reluctantly consents. Debbie loses control of the Commvee and it falls down a muddy riverbank. Before they can get it out, a storm erupts and the Commvee is washed away. That night while camping near the river Debbie goes off on foot in pursuit of the Commvee while Eliza goes off in pursuit of her and Darwin and Donnie go off in pursuit of her. Soon all become prey to a lion and two lionesses. Eliza will have to outwit them.
2	2	"Dinner With Darwin"	Sylvia Keulen	Steve Skrovan	Manaus, Brazil	September 3, 1998	009	2.39(HH)
Darwin sets off into the jungle to prove he still has his natural instincts. After a scary night in the jungle, he stumbles upon an empty shack and hides out, but the family who lives in the shack return to find Darwin.
3	3	"Bad Company"	Steve Ressel	Leslie Rieder	Manaus, Brazil	September 8, 1998	008	2.69 (HH)
A swarm of marmosets overruns the Thornberrys camp, and it's up to Eliza to beat them at their own game. Meanwhile, Nigel and Marianne search for the bird-eating spider, and Debbie searches for ingredients to make shampoo.
4	4	"Gold Fever"	Anthony Bell	Adam Beechen	Galápagos Islands, Ecuador	September 10, 1998	012	N/A
When Eliza and Debbie discover an old treasure map on the Galápagos Islands, they set out to claim their "riches." Once the gold is discovered, however, greed sets in and the girls begin an all-out battle of trickery to get the gold away from each other.
5	5	"Matadi or Bust"	Sylvia Keulen	Carolyn Omine	Matadi, Democratic Republic of the Congo	September 15, 1998	004	2.54 (HH)
The Thornberrys are in Africa along the banks of the Congo River. They have three days to catch a freighter at Matadi but if they miss it, they'll be stuck in Matadi for eight weeks. On the barge on the way to Matadi Eliza discovers that Kip and Biederman are also on board, and they have a captured hippo with them which they plan to sell to a zoo. While helping the hippo escape, Eliza, Darwin and Donnie fall overboard.
6	6	"Temple of Eliza"	Peter Avanzino	Barbara Herndon & Jill Gorey	Manaus, Brazil	September 17, 1998	005	N/A
Eliza comes to be treated as royalty among a group of jaguars. Meanwhile, Nigel and Marianne attempt a better understanding of Donnie's behavior and ways of communicating.
7	7	"Vacant Lot"	Cathy Malkasian	Monica Piper	Brazil	September 22, 1998	006	2.36 (HH)
A huge forest eating machine is destroying the Amazon forest. Nigel and Marianne set out to find government help in stopping it while Eliza teams up with the Amazon animals to fight it. Debbie's attempt to listen to a radio show are being thwarted by a radio that continually breaks down.
8	8	"Only Child"	Anthony Bell	Kate Boutilier	Brazil	October 1, 1998	007	2.55 (HH)
The Thornberrys are camping on the banks of the Amazon River so Nigel can perfect his insect repellent formula. Eliza becomes fascinated with a fresh water dolphin that she sees out in the river. Debbie is bored as usual when a teenage girl from the village wanders into camp. She and Debbie begin hanging together while Eliza worries that she could be a legend come true... a dolphin that takes the form of a young girl.
9	9	"Iron Curtain"	Cathy Malkasian	Mark Palmer	Ngorongoro Crater, Tanzania	October 6, 1998	001	2.21 (HH)
When the Thornberrys need some close-up footage of elephants, they travel to the Ngorongoro Game Preserve. At first, Eliza believes it to be a prison, and helps a baby elephant escape to find her mom. She quickly changes her mind about the place when they tackle with some poachers out to trap and kill her pachyderm pals. Eliza and the elephants bust back into the Game Preserve where they are now safe. Meanwhile, Debbie loses Donnie and has to find him before he gets sent off to a university as "the missing link".
10	10	"Valley Girls"	Anthony Bell	David Regal	Uganda	October 13, 1998	002	2.25 (HH)
The Thornberrys are in Uganda's Bwindi Impenetrable Forest to film the rare bird the great crested grebe. While Marianne and Nigel go off to film, the girls argue over the use of the tape player. In the ensuing argument, Debbie releases the Commvee's brake, and it takes off downhill. It finally comes to rest on a muddy riverbank where it's firmly stuck. The girls will have to work together to free it, with help from some local mountain gorillas.
11	11	"Blood Sisters"	Peter Avanzino & Carol Millican	Tom J. Stern	Andes, Peru	October 27, 1998	015	N/A
The Thornberrys are driving in the Andes Mountains in Peru on the way to visit Dr. Spinoza, the world's foremost authority on vampire bats. This is a special trip for Marianne who was a student of Dr. Spinoza's twenty years ago. On the way Eliza starts reading about bats and her movie memories about vampires start spooking her a bit. Dr. Spinoza lives in a remote, big castle and he's not at all like Marianne remembers. Everything about him gets Eliza's imagination going and Debbie sees it as a chance to have some fun at her sister's expense. Later, it turns out that the real Dr. Spinoza was tied up by a hunchback called, El Gordito who took Dr. Spinoza's place.
12	12	"Eliza-cology"	Cathy Malkasian	David Regal	Galápagos Islands, Ecuador	November 5, 1998	011	2.27 (HH)
The Thornberrys are on the Galápagos Islands to film the return of the sea turtles. While off exploring with Darwin and Donnie, Eliza gives a finch an unfair advantage in getting food and in so doing disrupts the delicate food chain of the island.
13	13	"Flight of the Donnie"	Steve Ressel	John Requa & Glenn Ficarra	Peru	November 17, 1998	013	2.26 (HH)
Eliza and Debbie must take over Marianne's duties when she is sick. Debbie goes with Nigel to shoot footage of a condor and Eliza must care for Donnie. Covered with feathers from a pillow, Donnie is snatched up by the condor and Eliza and Darwin must save him.
14	14	"Naimina Enkiyio"	Peter Avanzino	Mark Steen	Ngorongoro Crater, Tanzania	December 1, 1998	010	2.64 (HH)
Challenging an ancient Maasai legend, Eliza marches into a "haunted" forest to prove her bravery. Now, with night falling, Eliza must place her trust in the mysterious legends of the Maasai in order to find her way safely through the dark forest.
15	15	"Lost & Foundation"	Sylvia Keulen	Kate Boutilier	Padang, Sumatra, Indonesia	March 16, 1999	019	N/A
When the girls discover that their parents have mistakenly taken embarrassing home movies to an awards banquet, they join forces for different reasons in order to save face. Their cross-island trip turns into a race against time in order to beat their parents to the podium.
16	16	"Nigel Knows Best"	Sylvia Keulen	Kate Boutilier	Peru	March 18, 1999	014	2.24 (HH)
Eliza and her father set off on foot to scale the Andes. Nigel assures Marianne he will be very careful and keep close tabs on Eliza. Marianne is upset because her mother sent a care package. She thinks her mother doesn't think she is a good mother. While scaling the mountain, Eliza can't stand her father's overprotectiveness and wanders off on her own right when a blizzard strikes.
17	17	"The Great Bangaboo"	Cathy Malkasian	David Regal	Sambas, Borneo, Indonesia	March 23, 1999	016	N/A
When Eliza discovers that a local performer claims he can talk to animals she believes she's found a soul mate. Eliza must enlist the help of some very "urban" animals to sneak into the sideshow and meet "The Great Bangaboo."
18	18	"Rumble in the Jungle"	Anthony Bell & Rebecca J. Bristow	John Derevlany	Borneo, Indonesia	March 25, 1999	017	N/A
Eliza convinces a group of macaques to stand up to their enemies, Darwin unknowingly helps a different group with the same problem.
19	19	"The Dragon and the Professor"	Steve Ressel	Jill Gorey & Barbara Herndon	Rinca, Indonesia	March 30, 1999	018	2.22 (HH)
Eliza will stop at nothing to get a look at the gigantic, fierce Komodo dragon that lives on the Southeast Asian islands. Her plans are halted by the unexpected arrival of her home-schooling teacher who forces her to "hit the books." Meanwhile, Donnie breaks out with a rash from poison ivy and Nigel gets the chicken pox.
20	20	"Born to Be Wild"	Peter Avanzino & Carol Millican	S : Kathryn Wyand; T : Elin Hampton & David Fury	Padang, Sumatra, Indonesia	April 1, 1999	020	3.76 2.64 (HH)
The Thornberrys are in the jungle of Sumatra where Nigel is in pursuit of his lifelong dream... to see a Sumatran rhino in the wild. Eliza and Darwin set out to help him find it while Debbie and Donnie find some surfing teenagers.

=== Season 2 (1999–2000) ===
No. overall	No. in season	Title	Directed by	Written by	Location setting	Original release date	Prod. code	Viewers (millions)
21	1	"Rebel Without a Trunk"	Sylvia Keulen	Kate Boutilier	Solapur, Maharashtra, India	August 16, 1999	034	N/A
Marianne attempts to spend time with Eliza while riding elephants to a festival, but Eliza and her mischievous elephant friend get into trouble and end up burning down their campsite as well as a run in with a local Bengal tiger. Meanwhile, the rest of the family throw a party.
22	2	"Pal Joey"	Carol Millican	Gene Grillo	Tasmania, Australia	August 17, 1999	035	N/A
Eliza convinces a mother kangaroo that she can handle the responsibilities of baby-sitting. She quickly learns that this mischievous joey is more than meets the eye. After a close encounter with Tasmanian devils, Eliza is all too happy to be relieved of her duty. Meanwhile, Marianne organizes a prom for Debbie at the Commvee.
23	3	"Rain Dance"	Sylvia Keulen	Mady Julian & Arnold Margolin	Namib Desert, Namibia	August 18, 1999	029	N/A
With the Commvee broken down in the desert and no water left to survive, the Thornberrys go through desperate measures to maintain their sanity. However, on the verge of dehydration, Marianne convinces her family to perform the rain ritual pictured in a nearby monolith. Everyone cheers as the rains pour down among them.
24	4	"Darwin Plays the Palace"	Sylvia Keulen	Eva Almos & Ed Scharlach	Solapur, Maharashtra, India	August 19, 1999	039	N/A
The Thornberrys are in India when Eliza and Darwin are seen playing together by Kip and Biederman. They capture Darwin and sell him to a rajah who is looking for a new chimp act to entertain his court. Eliza frantically searches for the missing Darwin and follows a trail of kumquats Darwin left to the rajah's palace. Entry to the palace is forbidden and she'll have to rely on her wits to sneak inside and save Darwin.
25	5	"Stick Your Neck Out"	Cathy Malkasian	Adam Beechen	Serengeti Plain, Tanzania	August 23, 1999	021	N/A
Eliza finds a hero in a giraffe who can see distances with his height and warn others of approaching danger. However, to Eliza's dismay, the giraffe leaves the animals for his own needs. Only when Eliza herself is in danger does the giraffe return.
26	6	"No Laughing Matter"	Anthony Bell & Rebecca J. Bristow	David Regal	Serengeti Plain, Tanzania	August 24, 1999	022	1.99 (HH)
Eliza frees a spotted hyena from captivity, but having never lived in the wild, it doesn't know how to survive. Eliza attempts to teach it, but it seems hopeless—until a warthog threatens them and the hyena's natural instincts take over.
27	7	"Chimp Off the Old Block"	Steve Ressel	Monica Piper	Democratic Republic of the Congo	August 25, 1999	023	N/A
Darwin brings Eliza to his chimpanzee compound, and Eliza, who isn't used to the structure of the chimpanzee way of life, puts Darwin in an uncomfortable situation. After a leopard attacks, Eliza realizes the hierarchy is necessary for jungle survival.
28	8	"Koality & Kuantity"	Anthony Bell & Rebecca J. Bristow	David Regal	Melbourne, Victoria, Australia	August 26, 1999	027	N/A
The Thornberrys discover that koalas are missing from their native groves. Eliza decides to unravel the mystery only to discover Kip and Biederman masterminding the evil plot. It's now up to her to stop the culprits from wiping out an entire species!
29	9	"Chew if by Sea"	Steve Ressel	Monica Piper	Sydney, New South Wales, Australia and India	August 30, 1999	028	N/A
When the Thornberrys leave Australia for India, Eliza can't bear to leave her wombat friend, Emily. Even though Emily was told not to, she comes along with her. Now Eliza is constantly forced to re-create Emily's habitat in order to ensure her survival.
30	10	"Clash of the Teutons"	Cathy Malkasian	Adam Beechen	Great Dividing Range, NSW/Qld/Vic., Australia	August 31, 1999	026	N/A
The Thornberrys meet the Fensterkopfs who make false documentaries. The Fensterkopfs' son lies to Eliza and gets them all stuck on a cliff. After the families barely escape an avalanche, the value of truth is learned by all.
31	11	"You Ain't Seen Nothin' Yeti"	Carol Millican	Adam Beechen	Nepal	September 1, 1999	030	N/A
To study and protect the snow leopards from extinction and a construction site that is threatening their survival, Nigel's mentor (thought to be lost for many years) has left civilization to be a yeti. Eliza, having discovered his identity, helps him fend off the pending construction (with the unexpected assistance of an actual yeti).
32	12	"On the Right Track"	Cathy Malkasian	David Regal	Lappland, Finland	September 2, 1999	031	1.96 (HH)
When the Thornberrys are in Finland for the annual reindeer races, Eliza feels left out. She single-handedly uncovers a plot to sabotage the races, and, along with an equally excluded reindeer who didn't make the final cut, helps save the day.
33	13	"Polar Opposites"	Steve Ressel	Jill Gorey & Barbara Herndon	Greenland, Denmark	September 7, 1999	033	N/A
When a friendly polar bear named Wanuug is wrongly accused of vicious behavior, Eliza goes to great lengths to keep him from being harmed and learns the value of sticking by a friend in times of trouble. A vicious polar bear tries to kill Eliza, but the townspeople tranquilize it, and Wanuug is able to roam freely. Meanwhile, Debbie gets a job at a local diner.
34	14	"Two's Company"	Steve Ressel	S : David Regal; T : Monica Piper	Galápagos Islands, Ecuador	September 8, 1999	037	N/A
When Eliza is told that "Lonesome Jake" the Galápagos tortoise (based on the real-life Lonesome George) is the last one of his kind, she can't let his species become another name on the extinction list. Enlisting help from other animals, she soon discovers "Samantha" and brings the two tortoises together—blind date style. But she soon realizes that playing the role of Cupid isn't as easy as it seems.
35	15	"Show Me the Bunny"	Becky Bristow	Adam Beechen	Lapland, Finland	September 13, 1999	032	N/A
After Eliza saves a mountain hare from a determined stoat, she learns that underdogs come in all shapes and sizes.
36	16	"Reef Grief"	Sylvia Keulen	Allen Zipper	Great Barrier Reef, Queensland, Australia	September 14, 1999	024	N/A
Eliza gets in over her head when she assumes responsibilities she can't handle. She's soon forced to don scuba gear and save a fumbling Nigel and a tumbling Commvee under the dangerous waters of Australia's Great Barrier Reef.
37	17	"Thornberry Island"	Becky Bristow	David Regal	Uncharted Island in the Pacific Ocean	September 15, 1999	036	1.95 (HH)
The Thornberrys get stranded on an uncharted island, basking at first in all the beauty and the splendor, but soon discover that being marooned isn't all it's cracked up to be.
38	18	"Dances With Dingoes"	Peter Avanzino & Carol Millican	Kate Boutilier	Uluru, Northern Territory, Australia	September 16, 1999	025	N/A
Debbie discovers Eliza talking to dingoes and threatens to tell her parents. Eliza, concerned about the possibility of being shipped back to the United States as a science experiment and losing her powers, seeks help from nearby Aboriginal Australians. Together, they confuse Debbie into thinking it was all a dream.
39	19	"Tamper-Proof Seal"	Becky Bristow	S : Scott Gray; T : David Regal	Skagway, Panhandle, Alaska	October 19, 1999	044	2.19 (HH)
When the Commvee is surrounded by angry seals, Eliza tries her own methods to get them to move. But she learns from her Inuit friend Jim that traditional ways have their value.
40	20	"You Otter Know"	Sylvia Keulen	Sheila M. Anthony	Kamchatka Peninsula, Russia	October 20, 1999	045	2.35 (HH)
The Thornberrys are on the Russian peninsula of Kamchatka to film the Steller sea eagle. Nigel and Marianne take off to film via helicopter while Eliza and Darwin explore and Debbie takes a relaxation bath in a hot spring. They meet up with a friendly group of sea otters and start playing together when an oil tanker comes into the area. To make matters worse Kip and Biedermann rupture the tanker and start an oil spill. Eliza takes it upon herself to save the otters.
41	21	"Have Yourself A Thornberry Little Christmas"	Carol Millican	S : Kate Boutilier & David Regal; S/T : Adam Beechen	Namib Desert, Namibia	November 29, 1999	038	2.41 (HH)
Eliza goes to desperate measures to help animals survive during tough times along the Skeleton Coast. Her good-will intentions, however, will soon cost her family their entire supply of holiday cheer—and their Christmas dinner.
42	22	"The Kung and I"	Cathy Malkasian	Joan Considine Johnson	Kalahari Desert, Botswana	February 16, 2000	046	N/A
When the Thornberrys visit the !Kung people, everyone is shocked to discover that Debbie can click talk. No one is more surprised than Eliza, however, who is only cured of her jealousy by a !Kung healing ceremony.
43	23	"Dear Diary"	Becky Bristow	Alice Miller	Cuzco, Peru	February 17, 2000	048	N/A
When Eliza accidentally reads Debbie's diary she learns that Debbie thinks her little sister is an embarrassment. Debbie and Eliza have it out and learn the real truth about their relationship.
44	24	"Black and White and Mom All Over"	Cathy Malkasian	Eleah Horwitz	Chongqing, China	February 21, 2000	041	2.28 (HH)
When a seemingly abandoned panda imprints on Debbie, Eliza doubts Debbie's "parenting" ability—until a monsoon convinces Eliza that Debbie can handle more than she lets on.
45	25	"A Tiger by the Tail"	Mark Risley	Adam Beechen & Kate Boutilier	Ussuri River, Russia	February 22, 2000	042	2.30 (HH)
Eliza reunites with Kalla the Siberian tigress, and is stunned when she turns on her. Eliza's visiting Grandma Sophie helps her overcome her fears just as she is overcoming her own. Betty White guest stars
46	26	"Forget Me Not"	Mark Risley	Eleah Horwitz & Kate Boutilier	Mount Kilimanjaro, Tanzania	February 24, 2000	047	2.07 (HH)
When the Thornberrys visit Nigel's best friend Jomo, they search for an elephant named Rebecca that Nigel saved 20 years earlier. As the family attends to an elephant stuck in a mudhole, Eliza bonds with Rebecca. Sadly, Eliza learns that Rebecca is old and ready to die.
47	27	"Song for Eliza"	Carol Millican	S : Sarah Jane Cunningham & David Regal; T : Sarah Jane Cunningham & Suzie Villandry	Kahoolawe, Hawaii	February 25, 2000	049	3.45 2.33 (HH)
When Eliza tries to swim with the humpback whales, Darwin accidentally knocks Debbie's boombox into the ocean, which creates a disturbing noise and causes the whales to stop their ritual singing. Eliza attempts to set things right.
48	28	"Gift of Gab"	Cathy Malkasian	Eva Almos, Ed Scharlach & David Regal	Nigeria	February 26, 2000	040	3.75 2.26 (HH)
In this flashback episode, the story behind Eliza meeting Darwin and how she got her powers are revealed. Note: This episode has events that have happened two years prior to the start of the series. Participating Burger Kings would give out cards for kids to mark the animal's places for each episode that aired in a leadup to the episode on February 26, and a 1-800 number would appear. Kids had to dial this number and report their locations to the anonymous caller, and he/she would give out a trip around the world for the Grand Prize winner.
49	29	"Luck Be an Aye-Aye"	Carol Millican	S : Bob Daily; S/T : Adam Beechen	Madagascar	March 4, 2000	043	N/A
When Donnie kidnaps an aye-aye for a pet, Eliza must return the "bad luck" omen to his home before the villagers hunt him down. Meanwhile, Nigel and Marianne search for a chameleon to film.
50	30	"Bogged Down"	Sylvia Keulen	Peter Egan	Philippines	March 6, 2000	050	3.60 2.37 (HH)
The Thornberrys are in the Philippines to find the anglerfish. While Nigel and Eliza travel the river to find it, Marianne stays behind to help Debbie study for her history final. While looking for the fish, Nigel is stung by a venomous stonefish and Eliza must go into a dark, mysterious bog to get the antitoxin before Nigel dies.
51	31	"Monkey See, Monkey Don't"	Cathy Malkasian	T : David Regal; S/T : Emily Kapnek	Karnataka, India	March 6, 2000	051	N/A
When Eliza meets a group of temple monkeys, they con her into bringing all of her family's food. While Darwin tries to convince her otherwise, Eliza realizes that she's been duped and learns the value of Darwin's friendship.
52	32	"Where the Gauchos Roam"	Mark Risley	Adam Beechen	Argentina	March 13, 2000	052	3.62 2.21 (HH)
The Thornberrys are invited on a cattle drive by Marianne's old high school friend whose son, Miguel, isn't as adept at riding and roping as he claimed. In the end, Eliza helps him build confidence.
53	33	"A Shaky Foundation"	Carol Millican	David Regal	Victoria Falls	March 13, 2000	053	N/A
The Thornberrys are visited by the Foundation's head son, Tom, who splits up the Nigel and Marianne team to film the rock hyrax. An over-zealous Tom treats Eliza like a child until he lands the Commvee in a raging river. Eliza's quick thinking prevails and she saves her family.
54	34	"Cheetahs Never Prosper"	Becky Bristow & Frank Marino	Peter Egan	Uganda	March 20, 2000	054	N/A
The Thornberrys are on the African plains in the middle of a drought. Eliza wants to help the animals, but her parents tell her that the animals will become more aggressive due to lack of water and food. In an effort to keep her daughter safe, Marianne threatens to send Eliza home to America if she disobeys her parents. Eliza tries to help a young cheetah named Tano, but she quickly becomes the target for he and his mother's next meal.
55	35	"Gobi Yourself"	Sylvia Keulen	Joan Considine Johnson	Mongolia	March 20, 2000	055	N/A
While in the Gobi Desert to film the Gobi bear Eliza and a Mongolian girl, Arioka, secretly switch places so Eliza can ride across the desert on camels and Arioka can ride in the Commvee, but Arioka's parents change their plans. Eliza must figure out a way to get them back to the Thornberrys.
56	36	"Every Little Bit Alps"	Cathy Malkasian	T : David Regal; S/T : Robin Riordan	Switzerland	March 27, 2000	056	3.19
Eliza is afraid to admit to her friend Ben that she doesn't know how to snowboard, just as a rutting ibex is afraid to stand up to another ibex.
57	37	"Pack Of Thornberrys"	Mark Risley	Kate Boutilier	Yellowstone National Park, Idaho/Montana/Wyoming	March 27, 2000	057	N/A
Eliza and Debbie are fighting so much, Debbie decides to apply to boarding school and Eliza encourages her. But meeting up with a lone wolf teaches Eliza that families, like packs, belong together.

=== Season 3 (2000–01) ===
No. overall	No. in season	Title	Directed by	Written by	Location setting	Original release date	Prod. code	Viewers (millions)
58	1	"Dragon Me Along"	Sylvia Keulen	S : Gail Barrick; S/T : Peter Egan	The Great Wall, China	September 12, 2000	065	N/A
While visiting her Chinese pen pal Ling, Eliza recognizes some pandas and tries to save them from who she first believes is a poacher.
59	2	"Time Flies"	Carol Millican	Jill Gorey & Barbara Herndon	Everglades, Monroe County, Florida	September 19, 2000	058	N/A
The Thornberrys are in the Florida Everglades to film the endangered snail kite. It's also Nigel's birthday, and Marianne and the girls have a brand-new watch/compass for him. While Marianne and Nigel go off to film the girls and Darwin and Donnie explore the Everglades in an air boat. Debbie wants to keep track of their time and brings the new watch. Soon they get lost and while using the compass drop it overboard. A Swamp Witch and a hungry alligator will make getting it back very difficult.
60	3	"Tyler Tucker, I Presume?"	Mark Risley	Kate Boutilier	Democratic Republic Of The Congo	October 2, 2000	061	N/A
The Thornberrys are in the Congo along the banks of the Congo River to film the Congo clawless otter where they are waiting for Tyler Tucker to join them. Tyler and Eliza are cousins and close in age and very competitive with each other. When the Commvee is put out of commission they take a small steamer boat named Prudence up the river in search of the otter. Tyler isn't aware of all the dangers that the wild can hold and soon has them heading straight for disaster. Guest star: Home Improvement star Jonathan Taylor Thomas as Tyler
61	4	"Critical Masai"	Ron Noble	Peter Egan	Masai Steppe, Tanzania	October 3, 2000	062	N/A
While camping near a Masai village to film the bushbuck, Eliza and her cousin Tyler compete to see who's the bravest. Their courage is truly put to the test when they are caught out on the Savannah during a lightning storm. Guest star: Home Improvement star Jonathan Taylor Thomas as Tyler
62	5	"Horse Sense"	Cathy Malkasian	S : Sheila M. Anthony; S/T : Joan Considine Johnson	Mongolia	October 3, 2000	066	N/A
The Thornberrys are in Mongolia for the Naadam Festival. The festival is held outdoors and features events such as horse racing, wrestling and archery. Eliza decides she wants to enter the horse racing contest and asks Marianne to help train her. Debbie becomes involved in the archery contest and Donnie enters the wrestling contest. Eliza picks a nice, reliable horse to ride but what she really wants is to ride one of the wild horses. But they're not reliable and she gets more than she bargained for when she mounts one.
63	6	"Queen of Denial"	Frank Marino	Sarah Jane Cunningham & Suzie Villandry	Siwa Oasis, Egypt	October 4, 2000	070	N/A
The Thornberrys are in Egypt to film the elusive caracal. While Marianne and Nigel go off via camel to film, Eliza, Tyler and Darwin go exploring. While wandering through the desert, they fall into an ancient burial chamber. Eliza and Tyler will have to work together to avoid the booby traps that have been set to discourage grave robbers. Meanwhile, Debbie is convinced she's a descendant of Cleopatra. Guest star: Home Improvement star Jonathan Taylor Thomas as Tyler
64	7	"Island Trade"	Cathy Malkasian	Rick Gitelson & Joan Considine Johnson	Zanzibar, Tanzania	October 5, 2000	072	N/A
While on the island of Zanzibar, Debbie pleads with her mom to go to Stone Town Market for some shopping. Marianne is reluctant to let her have the Comvee but eventually gives in. Debbie, Eliza, Tyler and Darwin head to the market while Nigel, Marianne and Donnie go off to film in an ancient crater. Most of the shopping at the market is done by barter and they accidentally trade the comvee for a dress. The kids take off in pursuit of the merchant who is now driving their comvee to try and reach an understanding with him, but not before running the gauntlet of the local monkeys. Guest star: Home Improvement star Jonathan Taylor Thomas as Tyler
65	8	"Birthday Quake"	Becky Bristow & Frank Marino	Eleah Horwitz & Kate Boutilier	Mount Kilimanjaro, Tanzania	October 6, 2000	064	N/A
To celebrate his 13th birthday, Tyler and Eliza visit a pair of elephants in the African savanna. Tyler's parents are coming to pick him up and take him out of Africa when an earthquake occurs. Home Improvement star Jonathan Taylor Thomas guest stars
66	9	"The Legend of Ha Long Bay"	Mark Risley	Marsha Griffin	Ha Long Bay, Vietnam	October 10, 2000	067	N/A
Eliza encounters a mysterious creature while shooting a film with Nigel about manta rays.
67	10	"Spirited Away"	Sylvia Keulen	Sarah Jane Cunningham & Suzie Villandry	Oaxaca, Mexico	October 28, 2000	060	N/A
As the family prepares to film the "Day of the Dead" ceremony in a small town, Eliza meets a little girl who tells her about the spirits returning. Eliza is determined to find one, but when Donnie puts a valuable ring in a loaf of bread, Debbie and Eliza must search for the missing ring. Eliza gets some help from a mysterious woman, who she finds out, has been gone for many years.
68	11	"A Family Tradition"	Mark Risley	Alice Miller & Kate Boutilier	Ankarana Reserve, Madagascar	November 22, 2000	079	N/A
The Thornberrys are preparing for Thanksgiving in Madagascar when Grandma Sophie calls, inviting them home for the holiday. When Nigel and Marianne explain that they can't go home until they get footage of a fossa for The Foundation. Eliza and Debbie choose to go back to the United States without their parents, but before they board the plane, they reconsider in order to spend the holiday as a family.
69	12	"Happy Campers"	Sylvia Keulen	David Rosenberg	Bhutan	November 27, 2000	071	2.34 (HH)
A trip to Bhutan to film cranes finds Marianne and Debbie out in the cold and Eliza and Darwin on the run from the border police.
70	13	"New Territory"	Carol Millican	Joan Considine Johnson	Kakadu National Park, Northern Territory, Australia	December 4, 2000	075	2.45 (HH)
The Thornberrys meet an Australian family named the Gibsons when the Comvee runs out of gas. Eliza makes friends with the youngest member of the family named Bethany, who is in a wheelchair from cerebral palsy. The girls go land sailing and Bethany helps Eliza escape from a crocodile, but then get in an argument when Bethany thinks Eliza is feeling sorry for her being disabled. Will the two new friends find a way to make up? Meanwhile, Nigel and Marianne play the Gibsons in a very competitive game of Tricky Trivia.
71	14	"The Anniversary"	Cathy Malkasian	Earl Hamner & Don Sipes	Mount Fuji, Japan	December 11, 2000	078	N/A
The Thornberrys are in Japan near Mount Fuji to film the Asian black bear when Marianne's parents visit to spend their 50th anniversary with them. Grandpa Frank has had health problems recently and has problems acting his age. Eliza, Darwin and Grandpa Frank go off to climb Mount Fuji.
72	15	"Happy Old Year"	Becky Bristow & Frank Marino	Kate Boutilier	Quito, Ecuador	December 27, 2000	059	N/A
Debbie accidentally hurts her father's feelings, and joins a couple of eccentric, 1930s-era volcano chasers, Mitzi and Merrick Dash. Eliza goes after her to reclaim her friend, Santusa the llama.
73	16	"All Work and No Play"	Carol Millican	Peter Hunziker	Lake Baikal, Siberia, Russia	January 12, 2001	069	N/A
The Thornberrys are in Siberia along the banks of a river which feeds into Lake Baikal. Nigel and Marianne are there to film the Eurasian lynx while the girls are forced to stay at the campsite and take inventory of their provisions. This really annoys Debbie who wants to go to the town of Bolshoi Goti and pick up a CD of her favorite Russian Band The Slovniks. Debbie and Eliza both shirk their responsibilities... Debbie and Donnie take off via raft to Bolshoi Goti and Eliza and Darwin tour a nearby beaver dam. Everyone gets in trouble with an unexpected storm erupts.
74	17	"Operation: Valentine"	Mark Risley	Alice Miller	Alice Springs, Northern Territory, Australia	February 14, 2001	073	1.93 (HH)
The Thornberrys are broken down, The Mail plane drops off the Thornberrys current batch of mail. Debbie tries to bake cookies, which turn out badly. They try to escape from an angry eagle by climbing up a small mountain. Eliza slips and nearly falls. Darwin pulls her up on top of the small mountain. Nigel was on an explore of his own and comes across Donnie. Nigel picks up Eliza in his arms and carries her back to camp. Marianne upon seeing Eliza's symptoms quickly looks them up in a medical book. They have to get Eliza to the hospital as soon as possible, as her appendix is in need of an operation. They try taking the mini-com but it gets a flat and they are unable to put the spare on it because the spare is already being used.
75	18	"Hello, Dolphin!"	Frank Marino	Peter Egan	Shark Bay, Western Australia, Australia	February 19, 2001	076	N/A
Nigel and Marianne are on a dangerous assignment to film some tiger sharks while Eliza goes swimming with some dolphins. Meanwhile, Debbie gets dumped by her e-mail boyfriend Sven. When the kids take a boat out with the dolphins to swim in the deep sea, they may get some unexpected visitors.
76	19	"April Fool's Day"	Carol Millican	Joan Considine Johnson	Okavango Delta, Botswana	April 1, 2001	063	3.20 2.27 (HH)
It's April Fools' Day, and the Thornberrys are trying to outdo each other by way of April Fool's jokes. At first, it's a lot of fun, but when Tyler and Eliza encounter some quicksand and a lion, will they learn not to cry wolf?
77	20	"Gem of a Mom"	Ron Noble	Sarah Jane Cunningham & Suzie Villandry	Karakoram, Pakistan	May 10, 2001	068	1.85 (HH)
The Thornberrys are in Pakistan when Eliza and Debbie realize they've forgotten it's Mothers Day. The girls search through the marketplace to find the perfect gift for their mother. They come upon a stand that is selling jewels that they can't afford so after a rockslide closes the road they are traveling on, Debbie and Eliza plan to find their own gemstones in the mountains. While they search for the perfect Mother's Day gift, they continuously ignore Marianne's attempts to spend time with her daughters.

=== Season 4 (2001–02) ===
No. overall	No. in season	Title	Directed by	Written by	Location setting	Original release date	Prod. code	Viewers (millions)
78	1	"The Origin of Donnie"	Carol Millican	S : Joan Considine Johnson; T : Sheila M. Anthony	Borneo, Indonesia	August 18, 2001	081	3.83 2.41 (HH)
79	2	"The Origin of Donnie"	Joseph Scott	S : Joan Considine Johnson; T : Sheila M. Anthony	Borneo, Indonesia	August 18, 2001	082	3.83 2.41 (HH)
80	3	"The Origin of Donnie"	Dean Criswell	S : Joan Considine Johnson; T : Sheila M. Anthony	Borneo, Indonesia	August 18, 2001	083	3.83 2.41 (HH)
81	4	"The Origin of Donnie"	Ron Noble	S : Joan Considine Johnson; T : Sheila M. Anthony	Borneo, Indonesia	August 18, 2001	084	3.83 2.41 (HH)
The Thornberrys are preparing for Donnie's "birthday" party in Borneo when one crisis after another happens. Grandma Sophie decides to visit the same day Nigel and Marianne must capture a wild orangutan on film for the foundation. Donnie searches the jungles of Borneo for his ancestry, causing Eliza to worry that he'll break ties with the Thornberry clan. A fire breaks out in the forest and Donnie is blamed; can Eliza convince it wasn't Donnie and get the animals to safety? Meanwhile, Marianne and Nigel find shelter in a cave nearby, only to get lost inside, and Debbie and Sophie help the village put out the fire, while learning about Donnie's real parents. The rest of the fire is put out by rain, the others are reunited and Donnie is found. The family believe he's going back to his parents, but they soon realize the truth.
82	5	"The Trouble With Darwin"	Sylvia Keulen	S : David Regal; T : Jill Gorey & Barbara Herndon	Tanzania	October 31, 2001	077	N/A
The Thornberrys are in Tanzania, Africa to film the grand opening of Dr. Jane Goodall's chimpanzee sanctuary. Eliza can't wait to meet her idol Dr. Goodall. When they arrive, Debbie is put to work caring for baby chimps in the nursery while Eliza and Dr. Goodall have an awkward first meeting. She's not impressed with Darwin and the fact that he is domesticated. Eliza's feelings are hurt, and she runs off into the jungle with Darwin following. Trouble ensues when they run into poachers who have been working nearby. Guest star: Jane Goodall as herself. Note: This episode was originally produced for Season 3.
83	6	"Hot Air"	Ron Noble	Sarah Jane Cunningham & Suzie Villandry	Rotorua, New Zealand	June 1, 2002	074	N/A
The Thornberrys visit a Māori Iwi holding a Hui. As Debbie flirts with a young Maori, Eliza and Darwin have a fight. When Darwin leaves and Eliza befriends a brushtail possum named Penelope who gets her trapped in a hot air balloon, Darwin must come to the aid of Eliza. Note: This episode was originally produced for Season 3.

=== Season 5 (2003–04) ===
No. overall	No. in season	Title	Directed by	Written by	Location setting	Original release date	Prod. code
84	1	"The Wild Snob-Berry"	Dean Criswell	Peter Egan	Denali National Park, Interior, Alaska	February 3, 2003	087
At the request of the foundation, teenage rocker Shane G. joins the Thornberrys during their stay in Alaska. Since Eliza and Debbie both have a crush on Shane, they both go exploring with Shane only to discover how thick-headed he really is. Note: This is the first episode to take place after the events of both films, therefore Debbie knows that Eliza can talk to animals.
85	2	"Ice Follies"	Ron Noble	David Rosenberg	Glacier Bay National Park, Panhandle, Alaska	February 4, 2003	088
Shane and Eliza are saved by Debbie after their canoe capsizes.
86	3	"Fool's Gold"	Michael Dædalus Kenny	Kathryn McCullough	Yukon-Charley Rivers National Park, Interior Alaska	February 5, 2003	089
Eliza and Shane plan to go see an old gold mine full of fool's gold, but Eliza gets jealous when Shane invites Debbie along to help with her art project.
87	4	"Clash and Learn"	Anthony Bell	S : Sheila M. Anthony & Peter Hunziker; T : Peter Egan	Skagway, Panhandle, Alaska	February 6, 2003	090
Eliza's friend Kit becomes better friends with Shane.
88	5	"Sir Nigel"	Max Martinez	Sheila M. Anthony	Cairngorm, Scotland, United Kingdom	March 30, 2003	085
89	6	"Sir Nigel"	Ron Noble	Sheila M. Anthony	Cairngorm, Scotland, United Kingdom	March 30, 2003	086
The Thornberrys pay a visit to Nigel's parents in Scotland at Thornberry Hall right before Nigel is to be made a knight by Elizabeth II of the United Kingdom. Once there, Nigel's mother, Cordelia, presses him to accept a tenured professorship at the University of Oxford. The prospect of the family settling down in Nigel's native Britain upsets Eliza but thrills Debbie. Meanwhile, Eliza rushes to save some golden eagles from eating poisoned meat from a trapper. Eliza saves her golden eagle friend from the trapper and the Thornberry clan rushes to London for Nigel's knighting ceremony. After being knighted, the newly christened Sir Nigel chooses to continue his show over teaching at Oxford much to the annoyance of Debbie and Cordelia.
90	7	"Look Who's Squawking"	Ron Noble	David Rosenberg	McMurdo Station, Ross Dependency (New Zealand), Antarctica	April 4, 2003	080
Filming emperor penguins in Antarctica, Eliza begins practicing for her future profession as a vet, when she comes across a wounded penguin. She rescues her, but may have made matters worse by separating the penguin from her mate and her egg. When she borrows a snow speeder to get back to the penguin breeding grounds, she needs to make things right again. Note: This episode was originally produced for Season 3, which creates a continuity error as Debbie in this episode does not know about Eliza's powers.
91	8	"Eliza Unplugged"	Joseph Scott	S : Sheila M. Anthony; T : David Rosenberg	Behm Canal, Panhandle, Alaska	June 11, 2004	091
Shane is ready to leave the Thornberrys to go back to his life as a pop star and Eliza has to be fast to tell Shane her true feelings for him before it's too late. But when Shane and Eliza have a little fight and Shane runs away, Eliza must find him to make up and tell him her true feelings. Meanwhile, Marianne fears the girls are getting older and she's losing them. When Shane's plane arrives Shane says goodbye to each Thornberry and shares a kiss with Eliza. Eliza watches his plane take off and disappear from view.

== Films (2002–03) ==
Title	Directed by	Written by	Original release date
The Wild Thornberrys Movie	Cathy Malkasian & Jeff McGrath	Kate Boutilier	December 20, 2002
Rugrats Go Wild	Norton Virgien & John Eng	Kate Boutilier	June 13, 2003
