= Route 666: America's Scariest Home Haunts =

Route 666: America's Scariest Home Haunts is a non-fiction internet television series shown on Comcast's FEARnet website. The series is hosted by actress Danielle Harris. The program is produced by New York-based Atlas Media Corporation. The executive producer is Bruce David Klein.
