= Trailers from Hell =

Web series

- Website type: Film
- Available in: English
- Headquarters: {{{location_country}}}
- Country of origin: United States
- Website: trailersfromhell.com

Trailers from Hell (branded as Trailers from Hell!) is a web series in which filmmakers discuss and promote individual movies through commenting on their trailers. While the series emphasizes horror, science fiction, fantasy, cult, and exploitation cinema, films from a wide variety of genres have been covered.

Trailers from Hell later launched as a website in October 2007, as a collaborative project by film director Joe Dante, new media entrepreneur Jonas Hudson, graphic artist Charlie Largent, web developer Tom Edgar, and producer Elizabeth Stanley. It also premiered at SXSW in 2009. Kris Millsap, who joined the site in 2012 and later became a partner, oversees its digital direction and produces the companion podcast The Movies That Made Me.

== Commentary ==
Each trailer features commentary on the art, craft, and history of filmmaking, regarding both the trailer itself and the film it represents. Regular Trailers from Hell commentators, referred to as "gurus" on the series website, include (in addition to Joe Dante) John Landis, Guillermo del Toro, Roger Corman, and Eli Roth. Film editor and critic Glenn Erickson writes, "The host commentaries provide the real added value, cramming a wealth of information, humor and insights into the two- to four- minute trailer running times."

Some of the trailers he cut early in his career for low-budget filmmaker Roger Corman's New World Pictures have been called the "best trailers for less-than stellar movies you've ever seen". Dante was also able to augment his collection with many additional previews for classic and "not so classic" horror films during his time at Corman's studio.

The previously mentioned Erickson has referred to Trailers from Hell as "one of the brightest web destinations for fantastic film fans...." while the horror and suspense genre journal Cinefantastique called it "fabulous". American Movie Classics has lauded Dante for being "appreciative of and well-versed in the history of the exploitation cinema" through his work on Trailers from Hell.

== Home video ==
There have been two compilations of Trailers from Hell that have been released on DVD so far. Volume 1 was released in 2010 and Volume 2 was released by Shout! Factory on July 5, 2011.

== Distribution ==
On January 19, 2022, Trailers from Hell launched a dedicated FAST (Free Ad-Supported Television) channel on Plex, developed by partner Kris Millsap in collaboration with Best Ever Channels. The channel features Trailers from Hell commentaries, curated classic films, and special presentations.

== List of commentators ==
- Fede Álvarez
- Allison Anders
- Allan Arkush
- John Badham
- Rick Baker
- Jessica Bendinger
- Darren Bousman
- Axelle Carolyn
- Larry Cohen
- Julie Corman
- Roger Corman
- Don Coscarelli
- Jim Cummings
- Joe Dante
- Jon Davison
- David DeCoteau
- Guillermo del Toro
- David Del Valle
- Ernest Dickerson
- Illeana Douglas
- Bill Duke
- Francis Galluppi
- Mick Garris
- Mark Goldblatt
- Stuart Gordon
- Dana Gould
- Sam Hamm
- Marshall Harvey
- Mark Helfrich
- George Hickenlooper
- Jack Hill
- Heidi Honeycutt
- Gillian Horvat
- Tim Hunter
- Dan Ireland
- Kier-La Janisse
- Jesse V. Johnson
- Jonathan Kaplan
- Larry Karaszewski
- Lloyd Kaufman
- Michael Kennedy
- Daniel Kremer
- Karyn Kusama
- Neil LaBute
- Mary Lambert
- John Landis
- Max Landis
- Christopher Landon
- Quentin Lee
- Dennis Lehane
- Michael Lehmann
- Arnold Leibovit
- J.D. Lifshitz
- Rod Lurie
- William Malone
- Neil Marshall
- Bear McCreary
- Ib Melchior
- Mike Mendez
- Ed Neumeier
- Josh Olson
- Patton Oswalt
- Oren Peli
- Mark Pellington
- Dan Perri
- Michael Peyser
- Adam Rifkin
- Howard Rodman
- Eduardo Rodriguez
- Eli Roth
- Josh Ruben
- John Sayles
- Michael Schlesinger
- Steve Senski
- Katt Shea
- Alan Spencer
- Lewis Teague
- Michael Tolkin
- Brian Trenchard-Smith
- Jesus Trevino
- Robert Weide
- Ti West
- Richard Whitley
- Christopher Wilkinson
- Edgar Wright
- Dr. Z
- David Zeiger
