= List of The Asylum films =

The Asylum is an American independent film company and distributor that focuses on producing low-budget, direct-to-video films. The company has produced titles that capitalize on productions by major studios, often using film titles and scripts very similar to those of current blockbusters in order to lure customers. These titles have been dubbed "mockbusters" by the press.

== Films ==
=== 1990–2000s ===
Year	Title	Director	Notes	Mockbuster of / Based on
1997	Killers	David Michael Latt	The Asylum's first feature film.	—N/a
1997	Sorority House Party	David Michael Latt	Also known as Rock and Roll Fantasy.	—N/a
1999	Bellyfruit	Kerri Green		—N/a
2001	Fourplay	Mike Binder	Also known as Londinium.	—N/a
2001	The Source	S. Lee Taylor	Also known as The Surge.	—N/a
2002	Scarecrow	Emmanuel Itier	Followed by Scarecrow Slayer.	—N/a
2003	King of the Ants	Stuart Gordon		—N/a
2003	Speed Demon	David DeCoteau		—N/a
2003	Detour	S. Lee Taylor		—N/a
2003	Scarecrow Slayer	David Michael Latt	Sequel to Scarecrow. Followed by Scarecrow Gone Wild, which was produced by a different studio.	—N/a
2004	Death Valley: The Revenge of Bloody Bill	Byron Werner	The Asylum's first in-house film.	—N/a
2004	Evil Eyes	Mark Aktins		—N/a
2004	Vampires vs. Zombies	Vince D'Amato	Also known as Carmilla, the Lesbian Vampire.	—N/a
2005	The Beast of Bray Road	Leigh Scott		—N/a
2005	Frankenstein Reborn	Leigh Scott		—N/a
2005	Alien Abduction	Eric Forsberg		—N/a
2005	H. G. Wells' War of the Worlds	David Michael Latt	Also known as Invasion or H. G. Wells' The Worlds in War outside of North America.	War of the Worlds
2005	King of the Lost World	Leigh Scott	Also known as Syndrome of the Trespasser Island.	King Kong; Lost
2005	Legion of the Dead	Paul Bales		The Mummy; The Mummy Returns; Land of the Dead
2005	Jolly Roger: Massacre at Cutter's Cove	Gary Jones		—N/a
2005	Dead Men Walking	Peter Mervis		—N/a
2006	When a Killer Calls	Peter Mervis		When a Stranger Calls
2006	The Da Vinci Treasure	Peter Mervis		The Da Vinci Code
2006	Snakes on a Train	Peter Mervis	Directed by Mervis under the pseudonym The Mallachi Brothers.	Snakes on a Plane
2006	666: The Child	Jack Perez	Followed by 666: The Beast.	The Omen
2006	Halloween Night	Mark Atkins		Halloween
2006	Pirates of Treasure Island	Leigh Scott		Pirates of the Caribbean: Dead Man's Chest
2006	Hillside Cannibals	Leigh Scott		The Hills Have Eyes
2006	Bram Stoker's Dracula's Curse	Leigh Scott		Blade: Trinity; Underworld: Evolution; Dracula 2000; Van Helsing
2006	Exorcism: The Possession of Gail Bowers	Leigh Scott		The Exorcism of Emily Rose
2006	The 9/11 Commission Report	Leigh Scott	Based on the September 11 attacks.	United 93; World Trade Center; Flight 93
2006	Dragon	Leigh Scott	Followed by Dragonquest in 2009.	Eragon
2007	Transmorphers	Leigh Scott	Followed by Transmorphers: Fall of Man in 2009.	Transformers
2007	The Hitchhiker	Leigh Scott		The Hitcher
2007	AVH: Alien vs. Hunter	Scott Harper		Aliens vs. Predator: Requiem
2007	The Apocalypse	Justin Jones		—N/a
2007	Invasion of the Pod People	Justin Jones		The Invasion
2007	30,000 Leagues Under the Sea	Gabriel Bologna	Setting update of Jules Verne's 1870 novel Twenty Thousand Leagues Under the Seas.	—N/a
2007	666: The Beast	Nick Everhart	Sequel to 666: The Child.	—N/a
2007	Freakshow	Drew Bell	Remake of the 1932 film Freaks.	—N/a
2007	I Am Omega	Griff Furst		I Am Legend
2008	100 Million BC	Griff Furst		10,000 BC
2008	2012: Doomsday	Nick Everhart	Followed by 2012: Supernova in 2009 and 2012: Ice Age in 2011.	Doomsday
2008	Allan Quatermain and the Temple of Skulls	Mark Atkins		Indiana Jones and the Kingdom of the Crystal Skull
2008	Merlin and the War of the Dragons	Mark Atkins		—N/a
2008	Death Racers	Roy Knyrim		Death Race
2008	Journey to the Center of the Earth	Scott Wheeler; David Jones	Known as Journey to Middle Earth in the UK.	Journey to the Center of the Earth
2008	Monster	Eric Forsberg		Cloverfield
2008	Street Racer	Teo Konuralp		Speed Racer; The Fast and the Furious: Tokyo Drift
2008	Sunday School Musical	Rachel Lee Goldenberg	The Asylum's first family musical under Faith Films.	High School Musical 3: Senior Year
2008	War of the Worlds 2: The Next Wave	C. Thomas Howell	Sequel to H. G. Wells' War of the Worlds.	War of the Worlds
2008	The Day the Earth Stopped	C. Thomas Howell		The Day the Earth Stood Still
2009	The Land That Time Forgot	C. Thomas Howell		Land of the Lost
2009	18-Year-Old Virgin	Tamara Olson		The 40-Year-Old Virgin
2009	The Terminators	Xavier S. Puslowski		Terminator Salvation
2009	Mega Shark Versus Giant Octopus	Jack Perez	Directed by Perez using the pseudonym Ace Hannah. Followed by Mega Shark Versus Crocosaurus in 2010, Mega Shark Versus Mecha Shark in 2014 and Mega Shark vs. Kolossus in 2015.	—N/a
2009	Sex Pot	Eric Forsberg		—N/a
2009	Transmorphers: Fall of Man	Scott Wheeler	Prequel to Transmorphers.	Transformers: Revenge of the Fallen
2009	Princess of Mars	Mark Atkins	Retitled The Martian Colony Wars in some European countries and also known as John Carter Of Mars.	Avatar
2009	Dragonquest	Mark Atkins	Sequel to Dragon.	Eragon
2009	Haunting of Winchester House	Mark Atkins		The Haunting in Connecticut
2009	2012: Supernova	Anthony Fankhauser	Sequel to 2012: Doomsday.	2012
2009	Paranormal Entity	Shane Van Dyke	Followed by 8213: Gacy House (2010), Anneliese: The Exorcist Tapes (2011), and 100 Ghost Street: The Return of Richard Speck (2012).	Paranormal Activity

=== 2010s ===
Year	Title	Director	Notes	Mockbuster of / Based on
2010	6 Guns	Shane Van Dyke		Jonah Hex
2010	Titanic II	Shane Van Dyke	Unofficial sequel of Titanic. Followed by Titanic 666 in 2022.	—N/a
2010	Sir Arthur Conan Doyle's Sherlock Holmes	Rachel Lee Goldenberg	Featuring characters created by Arthur Conan Doyle.	Sherlock Holmes
2010	#1 Cheerleader Camp	Mark Quod		Fired Up!
2010	The 7 Adventures of Sinbad	Adam Silver; Ben Hayflick		Prince of Persia: The Sands of Time; Clash of the Titans
2010	8213: Gacy House	Anthony Fankhauser	Also known as Paranormal Entity 2: Gacy House.	Paranormal Activity 2
2010	Mega Piranha	Eric Forsberg; Stuart Gillard		Piranha 3D
2010	Airline Disaster	John J. Willis III		—N/a
2010	MILF	Scott Wheeler		—N/a
2010	Moby Dick	Trey Stokes	Also known as 2010: Moby Dick or Moby Dick: 2010; setting update of Herman Melville's novel Moby-Dick.	—N/a
2010	Mega Shark Versus Crocosaurus	Christopher Olen Ray	Sequel to Mega Shark Versus Giant Octopus. Followed by Mega Shark Versus Mecha Shark in 2014 and Mega Shark vs. Kolossus in 2015.	—N/a
2011	Almighty Thor	Christopher Olen Ray		Thor
2011	Mega Python vs. Gatoroid	Mary Lambert		—N/a
2011	Anneliese: The Exorcist Tapes	Jude Gerard Prest	Also known as Paranormal Entity 3: The Exorcist Tapes.	Paranormal Activity 3
2011	Battle of Los Angeles	Mark Atkins		Battle: Los Angeles
2011	3 Musketeers	Cole McKay	Setting update of The Three Musketeers.	The Three Musketeers
2011	200 mph	Cole McKay		Fast Five
2011	11/11/11	Keith Allan		11-11-11
2011	2012: Ice Age	Travis Fort	Sequel to 2012: Doomsday and 2012: Supernova; part of the 2012 film series.	The Day After Tomorrow
2011	Barely Legal	Jose Montesinos		—N/a
2011	The Amityville Haunting	Geoff Meed		The Amityville Horror
2011	Zombie Apocalypse	Nick Lyon	Also known as 2012: Zombie Apocalypse.	—N/a
2011	Princess and the Pony	Rachel Lee Goldenberg	The Asylum's first family film to be not marketed under Faith Films.	—N/a
2012	Grimm's Snow White	Rachel Lee Goldenberg		Mirror Mirror; Snow White and the Huntsman
2012	2-Headed Shark Attack	Christopher Olen Ray	Followed by 3-Headed Shark Attack in 2015, 5-Headed Shark Attack in 2017, and 6-Headed Shark Attack in 2018.	—N/a
2012	Bikini Spring Break	Jared Cohn		Spring Breakers
2012	Hold Your Breath	Jared Cohn		—N/a
2012	Abraham Lincoln vs. Zombies	Richard Schenkman		Abraham Lincoln: Vampire Hunter
2012	Alien Origin	Mark Atkins		Prometheus
2012	100 Ghost Street: The Return of Richard Speck	Martin Anderson	Also known as Paranormal Entity 4: The Awakening.	Paranormal Activity 4
2012	American Battleship	Thunder Levin	Also known as American Warships.	Battleship
2012	Nazis at the Center of the Earth	Joseph Lawson	Retitled Bloodstorm in the UK.	Iron Sky
2012	Rise of the Zombies	Nick Lyon		—N/a
2012	Bigfoot	Bruce Davison		—N/a
2012	The Haunting of Whaley House	Jose Prendes		—N/a
2012	12/12/12	Jared Cohn	Sequel to 11/11/11. Followed by 13/13/13.	—N/a
2012	Golden Winter	Tom Seidman		—N/a
2013	Barrio Brawler	Jose Montesinos	Also known as American Brawler.	—N/a
2013	100 Degrees Below Zero	R. D. Braunstein	Followed by Apocalypse Pompeii.	—N/a
2013	Celebrity Sex Tape	Scott Wheeler		—N/a
2013	13/13/13	James Cullen Bressack		—N/a
2013	A Snow Globe Christmas	Jodi Binstock		—N/a
2013	500 MPH Storm	Daniel Lusko		—N/a
2013	AE: Apocalypse Earth	Thunder Levin; Agung Bagus		After Earth; Oblivion
2013	Age of the Hobbits	Joseph Lawson	Also known as Lord of the Elves and Clash of the Empires.	The Hobbit: An Unexpected Journey
2013	Alone for Christmas	Joseph Lawson	Also known as Bone Alone. Although the plot has similarities to Home Alone, it was done with anthropomorphic animals.	Home Alone: The Holiday Heist
2013	Age of Dinosaurs	Joseph Lawson		Jurassic World
2013	Attila	Emmanuel Itier		—N/a
2013	Atlantic Rim	Jared Cohn	Also known as Attack From Beneath. Followed by Atlantic Rim: Resurrection in 2018.	Pacific Rim
2013	Hansel & Gretel	Anthony C. Ferrante	Followed by 2015 film Hansel vs. Gretel.	Hansel & Gretel: Witch Hunters
2013	Sharknado	Anthony C. Ferrante	The first installment in the Sharknado film series.	—N/a
2013	Social Nightmare	Mark Quod		—N/a
2013	Jack the Giant Killer	Mark Atkins		Jack the Giant Slayer
2014	Android Cop	Mark Atkins		RoboCop
2014	Age of Tomorrow	James Kondelik		Edge of Tomorrow
2014	Airplane vs. Volcano	James Kondelik		—N/a
2014	Alpha House	Jacob Cooney		Animal House; American Pie
2014	Apocalypse Pompeii	Ben Demaree	Sequel to 100 Degrees Below Zero.	Pompeii
2014	Asian School Girls	Lawrence Silverstein		—N/a
2014	Asteroid vs. Earth	Christopher Olen Ray		—N/a
2014	Mercenaries	Christopher Olen Ray		The Expendables 3
2014	Bermuda Tentacles	Nick Lyon	Also known as American Warships 2 in Germany.	—N/a
2014	Hercules Reborn	Nick Lyon		Hercules; The Legend of Hercules
2014	Jailbait	Jared Cohn		Orange Is the New Black
2014	Mega Shark Versus Mecha Shark	Emile Edwin Smith	Sequel to Mega Shark Versus Crocosaurus. Followed by Mega Shark vs. Kolossus in 2015.	—N/a
2014	Sharknado 2: The Second One	Anthony C. Ferrante	Sequel to Sharknado. Followed by Sharknado 3: Oh Hell No! in 2015.	—N/a
2014	Sleeping Beauty	Casper Van Dien		Maleficent
2014	Blood Lake: Attack of the Killer Lampreys	James Cullen Bressack		—N/a
2014	Ardennes Fury	Joseph Lawson		Fury
2014	Z Nation	Craig Engler; Karl Schaefer	The Asylum's first television series.	—N/a
2014	Santa Claws	Glenn Miller		—N/a
2015	Avengers Grimm	Jeremy Inman		Avengers: Age of Ultron; Once Upon a Time
2015	Bound	Jared Cohn		Fifty Shades of Grey
2015	Mega Shark Versus Kolossus	Christopher Olen Ray	Sequel to Mega Shark Versus Mecha Shark.	Attack on Titan (on a Kolossus character)
2015	Hansel vs. Gretel	Ben Demaree	Sequel to Hansel & Gretel.	—N/a
2015	Road Wars	Mark Atkins		Mad Max: Fury Road
2015	San Andreas Quake	John Baumgartner		San Andreas
2015	Sharknado 3: Oh Hell No!	Anthony C. Ferrante	Sequel to Sharknado 2: The Second One. Followed by Sharknado: The 4th Awakens in 2016.	—N/a
2015	Flight World War II	Emile Edwin Smith		The Final Countdown
2015	3-Headed Shark Attack	Christopher Olen Ray	Sequel to 2-Headed Shark Attack. Followed by 5-Headed Shark Attack in 2017 and 6-Headed Shark Attack in 2018.	—N/a
2015	Martian Land	Scott Wheeler		The Martian
2016	Sinbad and the War of the Furies	Scott Wheeler	Sequel to The 7 Adventures of Sinbad.	—N/a
2016	Zoombies	Glenn Miller	Followed by Zoombies 2 in 2019 and Aquarium of the Dead in 2021.	Zoo; Zombeavers
2016	Sharknado: The 4th Awakens	Anthony C. Ferrante	Sequel to Sharknado 3: Oh Hell No!. Followed by Sharknado 5: Global Swarming in 2017.	—N/a
2016	Izzie's Way Home	Sasha Burrow	The Asylum's first animated film.	Finding Dory
2016	In the Name of Ben-Hur	Nick Lyon		Ben-Hur
2016	Independents' Day	Laura Beth Love		Independence Day: Resurgence
2016	Little Dead Rotting Hood	Jared Cohn		Red Riding Hood
2016	Sinister Squad	Jeremy Inman	Set in the same universe as Avengers Grimm.	Suicide Squad
2016	Ghosthunters	Pearry Reginald Teo		Ghostbusters
2016	Dead 7	Danny Roew		The Magnificent Seven
2016	Elvis Lives!	Steve Balderson	Made for AXS TV as their first television film.	—N/a
2016	Trolland	Ron Thorton	The Asylum's second animated film.	Trolls
2017	Planet of the Sharks	Mark Atkins		War for the Planet of the Apes
2017	Empire of the Sharks	Mark Atkins	Sequel to Planet of the Sharks.	War for the Planet of the Apes
2017	Jurassic School	Mark Atkins		—N/a
2017	Ice Sharks	Emile Edwin Smith		—N/a
2017	Blood Brothers	Jose Montesinos	Also known as Psycho Brother-in-Law.	—N/a
2017	Nightmare Wedding	Jose Montesinos		—N/a
2017	Sinister Minister	Jose Montesinos		—N/a
2017	Oceans Rising	Adam Lipsius		—N/a
2017	Forgotten Evil	Anthony C. Ferrante		—N/a
2017	Sharknado 5: Global Swarming	Anthony C. Ferrante	Sequel to Sharknado: The 4th Awakens. Followed by The Last Sharknado: It's About Time in 2018.	—N/a
2017	Locked Up	Jared Cohn		—N/a
2017	Evil Nanny	Jared Cohn		—N/a
2017	King Arthur and the Knights of the Round Table	Jared Cohn	Setting update of the Arthurian cycle.	King Arthur: Legend of the Sword
2017	The Fast and the Fierce	Ron Thornton	Followed by Fast and Fierce: Death Race in 2020.	The Fate of the Furious
2017	Geo-Disaster	Thunder Levin		Geostorm
2017	CarGo	James Cullen Bressack	The Asylum's third animated film.	Cars 3
2017	5-Headed Shark Attack	Christopher Olen Ray	Sequel to 3-Headed Shark Attack. Followed by 6-Headed Shark Attack in 2018.	—N/a
2017	Alien Convergence	Rob Pallatina		Alien: Covenant
2017	Operation Dunkirk	Nick Lyon		Dunkirk
2017	Troy: The Odyssey	Tekin Girgin		300: Rise of an Empire
2018	Nazi Overlord	Rob Pallatina		Overlord
2018	Alien Siege	Rob Pallatina		—N/a
2018	Flight 666	Rob Pallatina		—N/a
2018	End of the World	Maximilian Elfeldt		—N/a
2018	Avengers Grimm: Time Wars	Maximilian Elfeldt	Sequel to Avengers Grimm.	Avengers: Infinity War; Once Upon a Time
2018	Megalodon	James Thomas		The Meg
2018	Tomb Invader	James Thomas	Also known as Tomb Hunter and The Tomb - Heart of the Dragon.	Tomb Raider
2018	Atlantic Rim: Resurrection	Jared Cohn	Sequel to Atlantic Rim.	Pacific Rim Uprising
2018	Alien Predator	Jared Cohn		The Predator
2018	6-Headed Shark Attack	Mark Atkins	Sequel to 5-Headed Shark Attack.	—N/a
2018	Triassic World	Dylan Vox	Followed by Triassic Hunt in 2021.	Jurassic World: Fallen Kingdom
2018	The Last Sharknado: It's About Time	Anthony C. Ferrante	Sequel to Sharknado 5: Global Swarming.	Bill & Ted's Excellent Adventure; Back to the Future
2018	Hornet	James Kondelik; Jon Kondelik		Bumblebee
2019	San Andreas Mega Quake	H.M. Coakley	Sequel to San Andreas Quake.	—N/a
2019	Arctic Apocalypse	Eric Paul Erickson		—N/a
2019	Mommy Would Never Hurt You	Daniel Lusko		Sharp Objects; The Act
2019	Black Summer	John Hyams; Karl Schaefer	The Asylum's second television series. Prequel to Z Nation.	—N/a
2019	Zoombies 2	Glenn Miller	Prequel to Zoombies and Aquarium of the Dead in 2021.	Zoo; Pet Sematary
2019	Monster Island	Mark Atkins		Godzilla: King of the Monsters
2019	Adventures of Aladdin	Glenn Campbell		Aladdin
2019	Clown	Eric Forsberg		It Chapter Two
2019	D-Day: Battle of Omaha Beach	Nick Lyon		Midway
2019	American Psychos	Jared Cohn	Also known as Psycho BFF.	—N/a
2019	Doctor Will Kill You Now	Rob Pallatina	Also known as Doctor Death.	Doctor Sleep
2019	The Final Level: Escaping Rancala	Canyon Prince		Jumanji: The Next Level
2019	Christmas Belles	Terri J. Vaughn		—N/a
2019	A Beauty & The Beast Christmas	Dylan Vox	Not to be confused with Beauty and the Beast: The Enchanted Christmas.	—N/a

=== 2020s ===
Year	Title	Director	Notes	Mockbuster of / Based on
2020	Battle Star Wars	James Thomas		Star Wars: The Rise of Skywalker
2020	Homeward	Michael Johnson	The Asylum's fourth animated film.	Onward
2020	My Nightmare Landlord	Dylan Vox		—N/a
2020	Collision Earth	Matthew Boda		—N/a
2020	Fast and Fierce: Death Race	Jared Cohn	Sequel to The Fast and the Fierce.	Fast & Furious 9, Death Race
2020	Top Gunner	Daniel Lusko	Was released to cash in on a previous release date that was changed. Also known as "Wingmen: Under Siege".	Top Gun: Maverick
2020	Shark Season	Jared Cohn	Re-released in LMN as Deep Blue Nightmare in 2021.	—N/a
2020	Monster Hunters	Brendan Petrizzo		Monster Hunter
2020	Apocalypse of Ice	Maximilian Elfeldt		The Day After Tomorrow
2020	Asteroid-a-geddon	Geoff Meed		—N/a
2020	Airliner Sky Battle	Rob Pallatina	Also known as Skyjacked.	—N/a
2020	Christmas in Vienna	Maclain Nelson		—N/a
2020	Beaus of Holly	Anthony C. Ferrante		—N/a
2020	Meteor Moon	Brian Nowak		Moonfall
2021	Triassic Hunt	Gerald Rascionato	Sequel to Triassic World. Was released to cash in on a previous release date that was changed.	Jurassic World Dominion
2021	Alien Conquest/2021 War Of The Worlds	Mario N. Bonassin		The War of the Worlds
2021	Ape vs. Monster	Daniel Lusko		Godzilla vs. Kong
2021	Aquarium of the Dead	Glenn Miller	Sequel to Zoombies and Zoombies 2.	Zoo
2021	The Rebels of PT-218	Nick Lyon		—N/a
2021	Jungle Run	Noah Luke		Jungle Cruise
2021	Planet Dune	Glenn Campbell & Tammy Klein	Stars Sean Young, who also starred in the 1984 Dune film.	Dune
2021	Insect	Riccardo Paoletti		—N/a
2021	Devil's Triangle	Brendan Petrizzo		—N/a
2021	MegaBoa	Mario N. Bonassin		Anacondas: The Hunt for the Blood Orchid
2021	Swim	Jared Cohn	Made in collaboration with Tubi as their first original film	—N/a
2021	Megalodon Rising	Brian Nowak	Sequel to Megalodon.	Meg 2: The Trench
2021	Robotapocalypse	David Michael Latt		Terminator 3: Rise of the Machines
2021	Tales of a Fifth Grade Robin Hood	Dylan Vox	Made in collaboration with Tubi as their second original film	—N/a
2021	War of the Worlds: Annihilation	Maximilian Elfeldt		War of the Worlds
2022	Moon Crash	Noah Luke		Moonfall
2022	Dracula: The Original Living Vampire	Maximilian Elfeldt		Morbius
2022	Titanic 666	Nick Lyon	Sequel to Titanic II.	Titanic, Studio 666
2022	4 Horsemen: Apocalypse	Geoff Meed		—N/a
2022	Top Gunner: Danger Zone	Glenn Miller	Sequel to Top Gunner. It is the first film by The Asylum to get a theatrical release.	Top Gun: Maverick
2022	Jurassic Domination	Brian Nowak		Jurassic World: Dominion
2022	Thor: God of Thunder	Noah Luke	The Asylum's second Thor movie.	Thor: Love and Thunder
2022	Shark Frenzy	Ryan Ebert		—N/a
2022	Shark Side of the Moon	Glenn Campbell & Tammy Klein		—N/a
2022	Super Volcano	Jared Cohn		—N/a
2022	Bullet Train Down	Brian Nowak		Bullet Train
2022	Shark Waters	Jadon Cal		—N/a
2022	Headless Horseman	José Prendes		Ghost Rider
2022	Battle for Pandora	Noah Luke		Avatar: The Way of Water
2022	2025 Armageddon	Michael Su	A crossover film featuring all of The Asylum's monsters. Released to commemorate the 25th anniversary of The Asylum.	Alien, Godzilla, King Kong, Pacific Rim, Snakes on a Plane, Monsterverse
2022	Attack on Titan	Noah Luke	Not based on any film, but named after Attack on Titan.	—N/a
2023	Ape vs. Mecha Ape	Marc Gottlieb	Sequel to Ape vs. Monster.	King Kong Escapes, Godzilla vs. Kong
2023	Doomsday Meteor	Noah Luke		—N/a
2023	The Little Mermaid	Michael Johnson	The Asylum's fifth animated film.	The Little Mermaid
2023	Transmorphers: Mech Beasts	Michael Su	Sequel to Transmorphers: Fall of Man.	Transformers: Rise of the Beasts
2023	End Times	Jim Towns		The Last of Us
2023	Sharknado: 10th Anniversary Edition	Anthony C. Ferrante	Sharknado with new special effects and deleted scenes released for the film's tenth anniversary.	—N/a
2023	DC Down	Geoff Meed		
2023	Megalodon: The Frenzy	Brendan Petrizzo	Sequel to Megalodon Rising.	Meg 2: The Trench
2023	The Exorcists	Jose Prendes		The Exorcist: Believer
2023	Alien Apocalypse	Adrian Avila		—N/a
2023	Assault on Hill 400	Christopher Ray		—N/a
2023	Top Gunner: America vs. Russia	Christopher Ray	Sequel to Top Gunner: Danger Zone.	—N/a
2024	Monster Mash	Jose Prendes		Universal Monsters franchise
2024	Snow White and the Seven Samurai	Michael Su	Was released to cash in on a previous release date that was changed.	Snow White
2024	Ape x Mecha Ape: New World Order	Marc Gottlieb	Sequel to Ape vs. Mecha Ape.	Godzilla x Kong: The New Empire
2024	Earthquake Underground	Brian Nowak		—N/a
2024	Road Wars: Max Fury	Mark Atkins	Sequel to Road Wars.	Furiosa: A Mad Max Saga
2024	Alien Rubicon	Adrian Avila		Alien: Romulus
2024	24 Hours to D-Day	Monroe Robertson		—N/a
2024	Witch Hunter	Marc Gottlieb		—N/a
2024	Gladiators	Christopher William Johnson		Gladiator II
2024	The Twisters	Michael Su		Twisters
2024	Methgator	Christopher Ray		Cocaine Bear
2024	Heretics	Jose Prendes		Heretic
2025	The Land That Time Forgot	Anthony Frith	Also directed by Frith, about the making of this film, is Mockbuster (2025).	Jurassic World Rebirth, The Land That Time Forgot
2025	Black Panthers of WWII	Michael Phillip Edwards	A historical film based on the true story of the 761st Tank Battalion	—N/a
2025	The Jolly Monkey	Ryan Ebert		The Monkey
2025	Snow White and the 7 Dwarfs	Erica Duke, Michael Johnson	The Asylum's sixth animated film.	Snow White
2025	Ballerina Assassin	Michael Su		From the World of John Wick: Ballerina
2025	Disaster Strike Force	Jared Cohn		—N/a
2025	Airplane 2025	Adrian Avila		The Naked Gun
2025	Morgan: Killer Doll	Jose Prendes		M3GAN 2.0
2025	Jurassic Reborn	Marcel Walz		Jurassic World Rebirth
2025	Shark Terror	Mario N. Bonassin		—N/a
2025	Evil Nun	Jose Prendes		—N/a
2025	Predator: Wastelands	Ryan Ebert		Predator: Badlands; Prey
2025	A Winnie the Pooh Christmas	Jimmy Gadd, Michael Johnson	The Asylum's seventh animated film.	—N/a
2025	Pandora: Fire and Ice	Canyon Prince	Sequel to Battle for Pandora.	Avatar: Fire and Ash
2025	The Anacondas	Marcel Walz		Anaconda
2026	Housemaid	Louise Alston		The Housemaid, Companion
2026	Frankenstein's Bride	Erica Duke		The Bride!
2026	The Last Hail M.A.R.Y.	Marc Gottlieb		Project Hail Mary
2026	Immortal Combat	Monroe Robertson		Mortal Kombat II
2026	Mummy: Bride of the Dead	Maurice Chauvet		Lee Cronin's The Mummy
2026	Ice-Pocalypse	Maurice Chauvet		—N/a
2026	Shark Thrash	Marcel Walz		Thrash
2026	Master of the Universe	Marcel Walz		Masters of the Universe
2026	Alien Disclosure Day	Adrian Avila		Disclosure Day
2026	Summerween	Ryan Ebert		—N/a
2026	A New Toy Story	Alex Heerman; Monroe Robertson	The Asylum's eighth animated film and the first AI-generated film.	Toy Story 5
2026	The Odyssey	Marcel Walz		The Odyssey
2026	Shark Frenzy	Ryan Ebert		—N/a
2026	Jurassic Rampage	Michael Su		The End of Oak Street
2026	Insidious Possession	Marcel Walz		Insidious: Out of the Further
2026	Meteor Extinction	Anthony C. Ferrante		—N/a
2026	Resident Dead	Ryan Ebert		Resident Evil
2026	America is Burning	Mario N. Bonassin		—N/a
2026	Arctic Annihilation	Anthony C. Ferrante		—N/a
2026	Street Fighters	Brian Nowak		Street Fighter
2026	Scrooge: A Christmas Carol Horror	Marcel Walz		Ebenezer
