= List of Sci Fi Pictures original films =

This is a list of films that have appeared on the Syfy (formerly Sci Fi) basic cable television channel. Despite the title of this article, only some are original films produced for the channel, while others are direct-to-video releases picked up for broadcast by Syfy. Previous editors have stated that some were broadcast, between 1999 and 2009, under the Sci Fi Pictures label – as those were the years that the channel was branded Sci Fi.

== List of films ==
- 2010: Moby Dick
- 2012: Doomsday
- 2012: Supernova
- 100 Degrees Below Zero
- 100 Feet
- 100 Million BC
- 2-Headed Shark Attack
- 3-Headed Shark Attack
- 5-Headed Shark Attack
- 6-Headed Shark Attack
- 2 Lava 2 Lantula!
- 40 Days and Nights
- 51
- 500 MPH Storm
- 30,000 Leagues Under the Sea
- AE: Apocalypse Earth
- A.I. Assault
- Abominable
- Age of Dinosaurs
- Age of Ice
- Age of the Dragons
- Age of Tomorrow
- Air Collision
- Airline Disaster
- Airplane vs. Volcano
- Alien Apocalypse
- Alien Express
- Alien Hunter
- Alien Lockdown
- Alien Predator
- Alien Siege
- Alien Tornado
- Almighty Thor
- American Warships
- Anaconda 3: Offspring
- Anacondas: Trail of Blood
- Android Apocalypse
- Annihilation Earth
- Anonymous Rex
- Antibody
- Apocalypse Pompeii
- Apocalypse of Ice
- Arachnoquake
- Arctic Apocalypse
- Arctic Predator
- Asteroid vs. Earth
- Atlantic Rim
- Atlantic Rim: Resurrection
- Atomic Shark
- Attack of the Sabretooth
- Avalanche Sharks
- Avengers Grimm
- Avengers Grimm: Time Wars
- AVH: Alien vs. Hunter
- Axe Giant: The Wrath of Paul Bunyan
- Aztec Rex
- Ba'al: The Storm God
- Babylon 5: The Legend of the Rangers
- Basilisk: The Serpent King
- Bats: Human Harvest
- Battledogs
- Battle Planet
- Battle of Los Angeles
- Beauty and the Beast
- Behemoth
- Bering Sea Beast
- Bermuda Tentacles
- Beyond Loch Ness
- Beyond Re-Animator
- Big Ass Spider!
- Bigfoot
- Black Forest
- Black Hole
- Black Swarm
- Blast Vegas
- Blood Lake: Attack of the Killer Lampreys
- Blood Monkey
- Bloodsuckers
- Boa vs. Python
- Bone Eater
- Boogeyman
- Bring It On: Cheer or Die
- Bugs
- Carny
- Caved In: Prehistoric Terror
- Cerberus
- Camel Spiders
- Children of the Corn
- Christmas Icetastrophe
- Chupacabra vs. The Alamo
- Chupacabra: Dark Seas
- Cobragator
- Collision Earth
- Control Factor
- Copperhead
- Croc
- Cucuy: The Boogeyman
- Curse of the Komodo
- Cry of the Winged Serpent
- Crystal Skulls
- Cube 2: Hypercube
- Cyclops
- Dam Sharks
- Darklight
- Dark Haul
- Dark Relic
- Day of Reckoning
- Dead 7
- Dead and Deader
- Dead in the Water
- Dead Still
- Deadly Descent: The Abominable Snowman
- Deathlands: Homeward Bound
- Decoys
- Deep Shock
- Descent
- Dinocroc
- Dinocroc vs. Supergator
- Dinoshark
- Disaster Zone: Volcano in New York
- Doomsday Prophecy
- Dog Soldiers
- Dracano
- Dragon Dynasty
- Dragon Fighter
- Dragon Storm
- Dragon Wasps
- Dungeons & Dragons: Wrath of the Dragon God
- Dungeons & Dragons 3: The Book of Vile Darkness
- Earthstorm
- Earth's Final Hours
- End of the World
- Empire of the Sharks
- Encrypt
- Epoch
- Epoch: Evolution
- Eye of the Beast
- Ferocious Planet
- Finders Keepers
- Fire & Ice
- Fire Serpent
- Fire Twister
- Flu Bird Horror
- Flying Monkeys
- Frankenfish
- Frenzy
- Gargoyle: Wings of Darkness
- Geo-Disaster
- Ghostquake
- Ghost Shark
- Ghost Storm
- Ghost Town
- Ghost Voyage
- Goblin
- Grave Halloween
- Grendel
- Grizzly Rage
- Gryphon
- Hammerhead: Shark Frenzy
- Hansel & Gretel
- Hansel vs. Gretel
- Harpies
- Headless Horseman
- Heatstroke
- Heebie Jeebies
- Hellhounds
- H. G. Wells' War of the Worlds
- Highlander: The Source
- High Plains Invaders
- House of Bones
- House of the Dead 2
- House of the Witch
- Hybrid
- Hydra
- I Am Omega
- Ice Quake
- Ice Road Terror
- Ice Sharks
- Ice Spiders
- Ice Twisters
- In the Spider's Web
- Independence Daysaster
- Independents' Day
- Infected
- Infestation
- Invasion Roswell
- IF2: Interceptor Force 2
- Iron Invader
- Jabberwock
- Jersey Shore Shark Attack
- Journey to the Center of the Earth
- Jules Verne's Mysterious Island
- Jurassic Attack
- Karma
- KAW
- Killer High
- Killer Mountain
- Komodo vs. Cobra
- Kraken: Tentacles of the Deep
- Lake Placid 2
- Lake Placid 3
- Lake Placid: Legacy
- Lake Placid: The Final Chapter
- Lake Placid vs. Anaconda
- Larva
- Lavalantula
- Leprechaun Returns
- Letters to Satan Claus
- Lightspeed
- Living Hell
- Locusts: The 8th Plague
- Lost City Raiders
- Lost Voyage
- Magma: Volcanic Disaster
- Malibu Shark Attack
- Mammoth
- Mandrake
- Man with the Screaming Brain
- Man-Thing
- Mansquito
- Manticore
- Maneater
- Martian Land
- Megafault
- Megalodon
- Mega Piranha
- Mega Python vs. Gatoroid
- Mega Shark vs. Giant Octopus
- Mega Shark vs. Crocosaurus
- Mega Shark vs. Mecha Shark
- Mega Shark vs. Kolossus
- Mega Snake
- Merlin and the Book of Beasts
- Metal Tornado
- Meteor Apocalypse
- Meteor Storm
- Mindstorm
- Minotaur
- Mississippi River Sharks
- Momentum
- Mongolian Death Worm
- Monster
- Monster Ark
- Monsterwolf
- Mothman
- Nature Unleashed: Avalanche
- Nature Unleashed: Earthquake
- Nature Unleashed: Fire
- Nature Unleashed: Tornado
- Nature Unleashed: Volcano
- Nazis at the Center of the Earth
- New Alcatraz
- Never Cry Werewolf
- Neverknock
- Nightmare Shark
- Night of the Wild
- No Escape Room
- NYC: Tornado Terror
- Odysseus: Voyage to the Underworld
- Ogre
- Ominous
- Ozark Sharks
- P-51 Dragon Fighter
- Painkiller Jane
- Parasite
- Path of Destruction
- Pegasus vs. Chimera
- Piranhaconda
- Planet Of The Sharks
- Planet Raptor
- Polar Storm
- Post Impact
- Project Viper
- Pterodactyl
- Pumpkinhead: Ashes to Ashes
- Pumpkinhead: Blood Feud
- Puppet Master vs. Demonic Toys
- Python
- Pythons 2
- Rage of the Yeti
- Ragin Cajun Redneck Gators
- Raptor Island
- Raptor Ranch
- Razortooth
- Red Clover
- Red Faction: Origins
- Red: Werewolf Hunter
- Reign of the Gargoyles
- Reptisaurus
- Return of the Living Dead: Necropolis
- Return of the Living Dead: Rave to the Grave
- Riddles of the Sphinx
- Rise of the Gargoyles
- Rise of the Zombies
- Riverworld
- Roadkill
- Rock Monster
- Robin Hood: Beyond Sherwood Forest
- Robocroc
- Roboshark
- S.S. Doomtrooper
- Sabretooth
- Saint Sinner
- San Andreas Mega Quake
- San Andreas Quake
- Sand Serpents
- Sand Sharks
- Sands of Oblivion
- Santa Jaws
- Sasquatch Mountain
- Savage Planet
- Scarecrow
- Scream of the Banshee
- Sea Beast
- Seattle Superstorm
- Seeds of Destruction
- Shadows of the Dead
- Shark in Venice
- Shark Season
- Shark Swarm
- Shark Week
- Sharknado
- Sharknado 2: The Second One
- Sharknado 3: Oh Hell No!
- Sharknado: The 4th Awakens
- Sharknado 5: Global Swarming
- The Last Sharknado: It's About Time
- Sharktopus
- Sharktopus vs. Pteracuda
- Sharktopus vs. Whalewolf
- Showdown at Area 51
- Silent Venom
- Silent Warnings
- Sinbad and the Minotaur
- Sinister Squad
- Skeleton Man
- Slayer
- Slipstream
- Slumber Party Massacre
- Snakeman
- Snakehead Swamp
- Snakehead Terror
- Snow Beast
- Snowmageddon
- Solar Attack
- Something Beneath
- Soulkeeper
- Space Twister
- Species III
- Species: The Awakening
- Splinter
- Star Runners
- Stickman
- Stir of Echoes: The Homecoming
- Stonados
- Stonehenge Apocalypse
- Storm War
- Supercroc
- Super Cyclone
- Super Eruption
- Supergator
- Super Shark
- Swamp Devil
- Swamp Shark
- Swamp Volcano
- Swarmed
- Tasmanian Devils
- Terminal Invasion
- Terror Birds
- Terrordactyl
- The 12 Disasters of Christmas
- The Beast of Bray Road
- The Crooked Man
- The Eden Formula
- The Fallen Ones
- The Ghouls
- The Hive
- The Hollow
- The Immortal Voyage of Captain Drake
- The Land That Time Forgot
- The Lost Future
- The Lost Treasure of the Grand Canyon
- The Night Before Halloween
- The Philadelphia Experiment
- The Sandman
- They Found Hell
- Three Inches
- Threshold
- Time Machine: Rise of the Morlocks
- Titanic II
- Tomb Invader
- Toxic Shark
- Trailer Park Shark
- Triassic Attack
- Triassic World
- Truth or Dare
- Vipers
- Warbirds
- War of the Worlds 2: The Next Wave
- War Wolves
- Webs: The Movie
- Witchslayer Gretl
- Witchville
- Wolvesbayne
- Wraiths of Roanoke
- Wyvern
- Xtinction: Predator X
- Yeti
- Zodiac: Signs of the Apocalypse
- Zombie Apocalypse
- Zombie Night
- Zombie Shark
- Zombie Tidal Wave
- Zoombies
- Zoombies 2

== releases ==
2008

== External nks ==
- "On Air > Sci Fi Pictures". Official site (Sci Fi Channel). February 2003. Archived from the original on March 4, 2003.
