= Paul Bales =

American film director

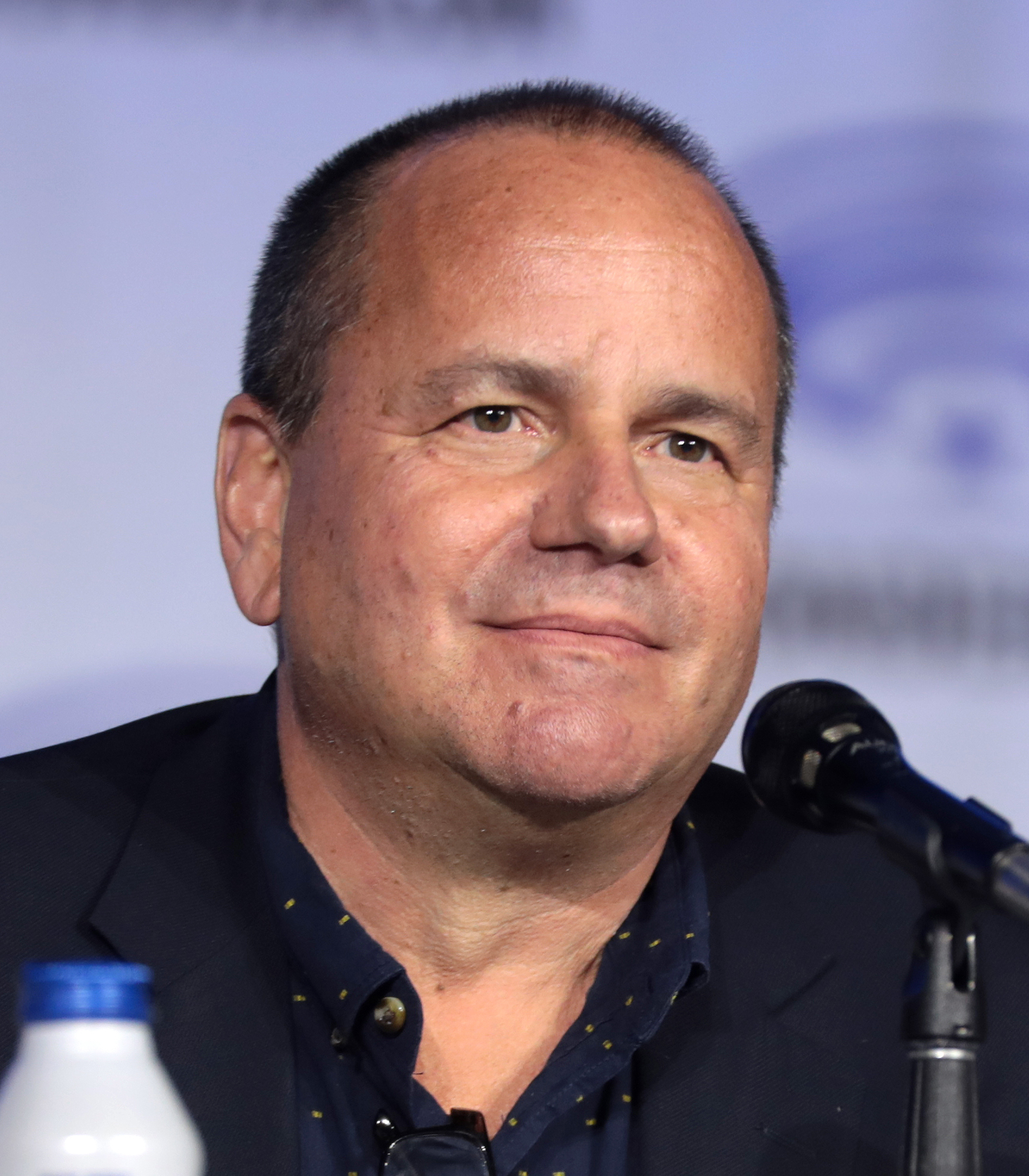
- Bales at the 2022 WonderCon
- Born: Paul S. Bales
- Occupation(s): Director, screenwriter, producer
- Employer: The Asylum
- Notable work: Legion of the Dead (2005)

Paul S. Bales is an American filmmaker, who has been the chief operating officer at The Asylum since 2006.

== Career ==
Working in the low-budget film industry, Bales is most known for being a production executive and producer for The Asylum, a studio specializing in mockbusters. He also directed Legion of the Dead, an early hit for the studio, in addition to writing or co-writing ten films.

== Filmography ==
Year	Title	Role	Notes
2000	Max Knight: Ultra Spy	written by	TV movie
2001	Reasonable Doubt	written by	direct-to-video
2001	The Source	associate producer	
2002	Killers 2: The Beast	written by	direct-to-video
2003	Detour	"Hungry Freak / Raver"	video
2005	Legion of the Dead	director, written by	direct-to-video
2006	The Da Vinci Treasure	written by	direct-to-video
2007	The Hitchhiker	executive producer	
2007	Supercroc	executive producer	
2007	The Apocalypse	executive producer	direct-to-video
2007	Transmorphers	associate producer	direct-to-video
2007	Invasion of the Pod People	associate producer	direct-to-video
2007	Universal Soldiers	associate producer	
2007	30,000 Leagues Under The Sea	associate producer	direct-to-video
2007	666: The Beast	associate producer	direct-to-video
2007	I Am Omega	associate producer	direct-to-video
2007	AVH: Alien vs. Hunter	associate producer	direct-to-video
2008	Monster	associate producer	direct-to-video
2008	2012: Doomsday	associate producer	direct-to-video
2008	War of the Worlds 2: The Next Wave	associate producer	direct-to-video
2008	Allan Quatermain and the Temple of Skulls	associate producer	direct-to-video
2008	100 Million BC	written by, associate producer	direct-to-video
2008	Street Racer	executive producer	direct-to-video
2008	Journey to the Center of the Earth	associate producer	direct-to-video
2008	Death Racers	associate producer	direct-to-video
2008	Sunday School Musical	co-producer	direct-to-video
2008	Merlin and the War of the Dragons	associate producer	direct-to-video
2008	The Day the Earth Stopped	executive producer	direct-to-video
2009	18-Year-Old Virgin	associate producer	direct-to-video
2009	Countdown: Jerusalem	associate producer	direct-to-video
2009	Dragonquest	associate producer	direct-to-video
2009	The Terminators	associate producer	direct-to-video
2009	Mega Shark vs. Giant Octopus	associate producer	direct-to-video
2009	Transmorphers: Fall of Man	associate producer	direct-to-video
2009	The Land That Time Forgot	associate producer	direct-to-video
2009	Sex Pot	associate producer	direct-to-video
2009	Haunting of Winchester House	associate producer	direct-to-video
2009	MegaFault	written by, associate producer	TV movie
2009	2012: Supernova	associate producer	direct-to-video
2009	Princess of Mars	associate producer	direct-to-video
2010	Sherlock Holmes	written by, associate producer	direct-to-video
2010	Meteor Apocalypse	associate producer	direct-to-video
2010	6 Guns	associate producer	direct-to-video
2010	Mega Piranha	associate producer	TV movie
2010	The 7 Adventures of Sinbad	associate producer	direct-to-video
2010	Airline Disaster	associate producer	direct-to-video
2010	#1 Cheerleader Camp	associate producer	direct-to-video
2010	Titanic II	associate producer	direct-to-video
2010	8213: Gacy House	producer (uncredited)	direct-to-video
2010	MILF	associate producer	direct-to-video
2010	Mega Shark vs. Crocosaurus	co-producer	direct-to-video
2010	2010: Moby Dick	written by	direct-to-video
2011	Princess and the Pony	co-producer	direct-to-video
2011	Mega Python vs. Gatoroid	co-producer	TV movie
2011	Battle of Los Angeles	co-producer	direct-to-video
2011	200 M.P.H.	co-producer	direct-to-video
2011	Almighty Thor	co-producer	TV movie
2011	2012: Ice Age	co-producer	direct-to-video
2011	Born Bad	co-producer	direct-to-video
2011	Barely Legal	co-producer	direct-to-video
2011	A Haunting in Salem	co-producer	direct-to-video
2011	Dragon Crusaders	co-producer	
2011	3 Musketeers	co-producer	direct-to-video
2011	Zombie Apocalypse (film)	co-producer	TV movie
2011	11/11/11	co-producer	direct-to-video
2012	2-Headed Shark Attack	co-producer	direct-to-video
2012	Celebrity Sex Tape	co-producer	
2012	Grimm's Snow White	co-producer	direct-to-video
2012	Air Collision	co-producer	direct-to-video
2012	Adopting Terror	co-producer	TV movie
2012	American Warships	co-producer	direct-to-video
2012	Nazis at the Center of the Earth	written by, co-producer	direct-to-video
2012	Abraham Lincoln vs. Zombies	co-producer	direct-to-video
2012	Bikini Spring Break	co-producer	direct-to-video
2012	Bigfoot	co-producer	TV movie
2012	Shark Week	co-producer	
2012	The Haunting of Whaley House	co-producer	
2012	Super Cyclone	co-producer	direct-to-video
2012	Golden Winter	co-producer	
2012	Hold Your Breath	co-producer	
2012	Rise of the Zombies	co-producer	TV movie
2012	Layover	co-producer	TV movie
2012	Clash of the Empires	co-producer	direct-to-video
2012	Love at the Christmas Table	co-producer	TV movie
2012	40 Days and Nights	producer	
2012	12/12/12	co-producer	
2013	Hansel & Gretel	co-producer	direct-to-video
2013	Sharknado	co-producer	TV movie
2013	Jack the Giant Killer	co-producer	
2013	500 MPH Storm	co-producer	
2013	Cleaver Family Reunion	co-producer	
2013	Battledogs	co-producer	TV movie
2013	100 Degrees Below Zero	co-producer	direct-to-video
2013	Age of Dinosaurs	co-producer	
2013	AE: Apocalypse Earth	co-producer	direct-to-video
2013	American Brawler	co-producer	
2013	Atlantic Rim	co-producer	direct-to-video
2013	Foreclosed	co-producer	direct-to-video
2013	Social Nightmare	co-producer	TV movie
2013	13/13/13	co-producer	
2013	Alone for Christmas	co-producer	direct-to-video
2013	Zombie Night	co-producer	TV movie
2013	The Bell Witch Haunting	producer (uncredited)	
2013	A Snow Globe Christmas	co-producer	TV movie
2013	Attila	co-producer	
2013	Neil Gaiman's We Can Get Them for You Wholesale	special thanks	short film
2014	Mega Shark vs. Mecha Shark	co-producer	
2014	Android Cop	co-producer	
2014	Jailbait	co-producer	direct-to-video
2014	Apocalypse Pompeii	co-producer	
2014	Alpha House	co-producer	direct-to-video
2014	Airplane vs. Volcano	co-producer	direct-to-video
2014	Bermuda Tentacles	co-producer	TV movie
2014	Asian School Girls	co-producer	direct-to-video
2014	The Coed and the Zombie Stoner	co-producer	
2014	Asteroid vs Earth	co-producer	TV movie
2014	Sleeping Beauty	co-producer	
2014	Age of Tomorrow	producer	direct-to-video
2014	Blood Lake: Attack of the Killer Lampreys	co-producer	TV movie
2014	Sharknado 2: The Second One	co-producer	TV movie
2014	Hercules Reborn	co-producer	
2014	Mercenaries	co-producer	
2014	Bachelor Night	co-producer	
2014	Santa Claws	co-producer	
2014	Ardennes Fury	co-producer	
2014	Age of Ice	co-producer	direct-to-video
2015	Bound	co-producer	direct-to-video
2015	Hansel vs. Gretel	co-producer	
2015	The Wrong Boyfriend	co-producer	TV movie
2015	Avengers Grimm	co-producer	direct-to-video
2015	Road Wars	co-producer	
2015	San Andreas Quake	co-producer	
2015	Mega Shark vs. Kolossus	co-producer	
2015	Flight World War II	co-producer	
2015	3-Headed Shark Attack	co-producer	direct-to-video
2015	Sharknado: Feeding Frenzy	co-producer	
2015	Sharknado 3: Oh Hell No!	co-producer	TV movie
2015	Night of the Wild	co-producer	TV movie
2015	Martian Land	co-producer	direct-to-video
2015	Sharknado: Heart of Sharkness	co-producer	
2016	Little Dead Rotting Hood	co-producer	
2016	Zoombies	co-producer	
2016	Break-Up Nightmare	co-producer	
2016	The Other Wife	co-producer	TV movie
2016	Fortune Cookie	co-producer	
2016	Dead 7	executive producer	
2016	Izzie's Way Home	co-producer	
2016	Independents' Day	co-producer	direct-to-video
2016	Sinister Squad	co-producer	
2016	Ghosthunters	co-producer	
2016	Ice Sharks	co-producer	TV movie
2016	Planet of the Sharks	co-producer	TV movie
2016	Sharknado 4: The 4th Awakens	executive producer	TV movie
2016	In the Name of Ben Hur	co-producer	
2016	Elvis Lives!	co-executive producer	TV movie
2016	Isle of the Dead	co-producer	
2016	#FollowFriday	co-producer	TV movie
2016	Trollz	co-producer	direct-to-video
2016	Nightmare Wedding	co-producer	TV movie
2016	Sinbad and the War of the Furies	co-producer	
2016	Evil Nanny	co-producer	TV movie
2016	Restoration	special thanks	
2016	If Looks Could Kill	co-producer	TV movie
2017	Oceans Rising	co-producer	
2017	Jurassic School	co-producer	
2017	Forgotten Evil	co-producer	TV movie
2017	The Fast and the Fierce	co-producer	
2017	Dream House Nightmare	co-producer	TV movie
2017	King Arthur and the Knights of the Round Table	co-producer	
2017	Sinister Minister	co-producer	TV movie
2017	CarGo	co-producer	
2017	Locked Up	co-producer	direct-to-video
2017	Alien Convergence	co-producer	direct-to-video
2017	Operation Dunkirk	co-producer	direct-to-video
2017	5 Headed Shark Attack	co-producer	TV movie
2017	Empire of the Sharks	co-producer	TV movie
2017	Sharknado 5: Global Swarming	executive producer	TV movie
2017	Geo-Disaster	co-producer	direct-to-video
2017	Troy the Odyssey	co-producer	
2017	Blood Brothers	co-producer	TV movie
2017	Bethany	special thanks	
2018	Atlantic Rim: Resurrection	co-producer	
2018	Tomb Invader	co-producer	TV movie
2018	Avengers Grimm: Time Wars	co-producer	direct-to-video
2018	Flight 666	co-producer	
2018	Triassic World	co-producer	direct-to-video
2018	Alien Siege	co-producer	
2018	6-Headed Shark Attack	co-producer	TV movie
2018	Megalodon	co-producer	TV movie
2018	The Last Sharknado: It's About Time	executive producer	TV movie
2018	Alien Predator	co-producer	
2018	Nazi Overlord	co-producer	
2018	The Adventures of the Fatbat Episode III: Queen of the City, Part II: The Reckoning	"Mr. Hollywood"	
2018	End of the World	co-producer	
2018	Hornet	co-producer	
2018	Rent-an-Elf	co-producer	TV movie
2014–2018	Z Nation	executive producer	TV series
2019	Zoombies 2	co-producer	
2019	Mommy Would Never Hurt You	co-producer	TV movie
2019	San Andreas Mega Quake	co-producer	direct-to-video
2019–2021	Black Summer	executive producer	TV series
2019	Adventures of Aladdin	co-producer	
2019	Monster Island	co-producer	TV movie
2019	D-Day: Battle of Omaha Beach	co-producer	
2019	Loved to Death	producer	
2019	Arctic Apocalypse	co-producer	
2019	Clown	co-producer	
2019	American Psychos	co-producer	TV movie
2019	Christmas Belles	co-producer	TV movie
2019	The Nightmare House	co-producer	TV movie
2019	Doctor Death	co-producer	
2019	The Final Level: Escaping Rancala	co-producer	
2019	Christmas in Vienna	co-producer	TV movie
2019	A Beauty & The Beast Christmas	co-producer	TV movie
2020	Winter in Vail	executive producer	TV movie
2020	Battle Star Wars	co-producer	
2020	Homeward	co-producer	
2020	Collision Earth	co-producer	TV movie
2020	Fast and Fierce: Death Race	co-producer	
2020	Top Gunner	co-producer	
2020	Shark Season	co-producer	
2020	Monster Hunters	co-producer	
2020	Pool Boy Nightmare	co-producer	TV movie
2020	Apocalypse of Ice	co-producer	
2020	Asteroid-a-Geddon	co-producer	
2020	Airliner Sky Battle	co-producer	
2020	Beaus of Holly	co-producer	TV movie
2020	Meteor Moon	co-producer	
2021	Triassic Hunt	co-producer	
2021	Alien Conquest	co-producer	
2021	Ape vs. Monster	co-producer	
2021	Star Battleship Wars	producer	
2021	Aquarium of the Dead	co-producer	
2021	Jungle Run	co-producer	
2021	The Rebels of PT-218	co-producer	
2021	Robotapocalypse	co-producer	
2021	Swim	co-producer	
2021	Megalodon Rising	co-producer	
2021	Tales of a Fifth Grade Robin Hood	co-producer	
2021	Killer Grades	co-producer	TV movie
2021	Alien Kong	producer	
2021	Planet Dune	co-producer	
2021	Devil's Triangle	co-producer	
2021	War of the Worlds: Annihilation	co-producer	
2021	Megaboa	co-producer	
2022	Dracula: The Original Living Vampire	co-producer	
2022	Moon Crash	co-producer	
2022	Family Friends	co-producer	TV movie
2022	Triple Threat	co-producer	TV movie
2022	English Estate	co-producer	TV movie
2022	Titanic 666	co-producer	
2022	4 Horsemen: Apocalypse	co-producer	
2022	Top Gunner: Danger Zone	co-producer	
2022	Jurassic Domination	co-producer	
2022	Thor: God of Thunder	co-producer	
2022	Bullet Train Down	co-producer	
2022	Shark Side of the Moon	co-producer	
2022	Shark Waters	co-producer	
2022	Time Pirates	co-producer	
2022	Attack on Titan	co-producer	
2022	Infamously in Love	co-producer	TV movie
2022	Super Volcano	co-producer	TV movie
2022	Headless Horseman	co-producer	
2022	Hunters of Triassic World	producer	
2022	Battle for Pandora	co-producer	
2022	20.0 Megaquake	co-producer	TV movie
2022	Crown Prince of Christmas	co-producer	TV movie
2022	A Belgian Chocolate Christmas	co-producer	TV movie
2022	2025 Armageddon	co-producer	
2023	The Wedding in the Hamptons	co-producer	TV movie
2023	Ice Storm	co-producer	TV movie
2023	Butch Cassidy and the Wild Bunch	co-producer	
2023	Ape vs. Mecha Ape	co-producer	
2023	Doomsday Meteor	co-producer	
2023	Assault on Hill 400	co-producer	
2023	The Little Mermaid	co-producer	
2023	Butch vs. Sundance	co-producer	
2023	DC Down	co-producer	
2023	Three Dates to Forever	co-producer	
2023	Transmorphers: Mech Beasts	co-producer	
2023	Blind Waters	co-producer	
2023	Megalodon: The Frenzy	co-producer	
2023	Top Gunner: America vs. Russia	co-producer	
2023	The Exorcists	co-producer	
2023	Meth Gator	co-producer	
2023	Dante's Hotel	co-producer	
2023	Alien Apocalypse	co-producer	
2023	Arctic Armageddon	co-producer	
2023	12 Games of Christmas	executive producer	
2023	America Is Sinking	co-producer	
2024	Prepare to Die	co-producer	
2024	Planetquake	co-producer	
2024	Snow White and the Seven Samurai	co-producer	
2024	Monster Mash	co-producer	
2024	Ape x Mecha Ape: New World Order	co-producer	
2024	Earthquake Underground	co-producer	
2024	Road Wars: Max Fury	co-producer	
2024	War of the Worlds: Extinction	co-producer	
2024	The Twisters	co-producer	
2024	Continental Split	co-producer	
2024	Shark Warning	co-producer	
2024	Alien: Rubicon	co-producer	
2024	24 Hours to D-Day	co-producer	
2024	Witch Hunter	co-producer	
2024	Gladiators	co-producer	
2024	Heretics	co-producer	
2025	The Land That Time Forgot	co-producer	
