= Ape vs. Monster =

2021 kaiju film

- Theatrical release poster
- Directed by: Daniel Lusko
- Written by: George Michael Phillips
- Produced by: David Michael Latt; Paul Bales
- Starring: Eric Roberts
- Cinematography: Marcus Friedlander
- Edited by: Cameron Ames
- Music by: Mikel Shane Prather
- Production company: The Asylum
- Distributed by: The Asylum
- Release date: April 30, 2021
- Running time: 88 minutes
- Country: United States
- Language: English

Ape vs. Monster is a 2021 American science fiction monster film directed by Daniel Lusko and produced by The Asylum.

As the title suggests, the film is a mockbuster of Godzilla vs. Kong. The plot, however, borrows from the 1998 Godzilla film, Reptilian, The Giant Gila Monster and Rampage. It was released on April 30, 2021.

== Plot ==
A space capsule crashes near Roswell, New Mexico. Dr. Linda Murphy, answering to National Security Advisor Ethan Marcos, takes control of the investigation. The craft is from ELBE, a secret US-Soviet space program that aimed to end the Cold War by establishing a joint first contact. Marcos orders Linda to investigate the site before the Russians learn of the capsule's return.

Linda's father, Noah, was a lead scientist on the program. The two became estranged when Noah used Abraham, a chimpanzee the young Linda befriended, for the capsule's pilot. The mission was declared a failure when Earth lost contact with the craft in 2007.

Linda and her friend, Undersecretary Reynolds, lead a team to the crash site. They discover that the capsule's occupant broke out following the landing and the capsule is covered in a strange green fluid. (Note: Revealed as the blood of Kulalu in Ape x Mecha Ape: New World Order (2024)) Abraham, having grown several times larger, appears and kills Reynolds and the soldiers. Linda is knocked unconscious, but sees another team led by her former classmate Eva Kuleshov, now a Russian agent, arrive and tranquilize Abraham. An unnoticed Gila monster consumes some of the green fluid at the site.

Abraham is taken to Langley Research Center and confined while Linda, Eva and a team of scientists examine his mutation. At the crash site, a group of soldiers left to guard the capsule are killed by the now-mutated, gigantic Dinosaur-like Gila. Marcos sends Linda and her assistant Jones to pursue the creature. Linda and Jones witness the Gila destroy a bridge and a passenger train before heading underground.

Meanwhile, Eva discovers that the alien substance breaks down in Earth's atmosphere, so she secretly has the entire remaining supply injected into Abraham to stabilize it. Abraham grows even larger and escapes from Langley. Linda, confused over his sudden further mutation, meets with Marcos and Eva, with Eva mentioning rumors that Abraham destroyed the Extraterrestrial Defense Initiative, a successor to the Strategic Defense Initiative. It is found that Abraham inhaled the substance over time while in the capsule, while the Gila directly consumed it. General Delaney, Reynolds' successor, orders the team to find the monsters as soon as possible.

They track Abraham to Huntington, West Virginia, where Linda discovers the substance breaking down in blood he left behind, forcing Eva to admit her deception. Linda removes Eva from the team and joins a group of Special Forces soldiers who engage Abraham, but the men are all killed and Abraham flees. Eva disappears with an Apache helicopter.

Returning to Langley, Linda and Jones discover beams of cosmic energy transmitted from the Andromeda Galaxy are remotely controlling monsters via the substance in their bodies. The Hubble Space Telescope discovers an alien ship approaching Earth, forcing Marcos to call Noah in to provide assistance. Linda finds that Abraham may be able to resist the aliens' control, and she, Jones and Noah plan to jam the alien signal using a transmitter. The transmitter is attached to the Washington Monument shortly before Abraham appears in the city, guided there to decapitate the U.S. government in preparation for a full-scale invasion. Its jamming signal quickly frees him, but the Gila monster is unaffected and emerges to wreak havoc. Despite Abraham no longer being a threat, Delaney orders a missile strike on him; this accidentally causes the Washington Monument to fall, killing Delaney and destroying the transmitter, thus allowing the aliens to regain control of Abraham.

Noah, having reconciled with Linda, discloses the existence of a prototype transmitter. Linda and Jones retrieve it, but Jones is devoured by the Gila. Upon its activation, Abraham is once again freed, and he battles the Gila to protect Linda. The Gila eventually gains the upper hand, but Eva disorients it with a suicide attack, allowing Abraham to retaliate and kill it by snapping its neck. Marcos sends in gunships to terminate Abraham, but decides to place faith in Linda's trust of Abraham, calling off the strike at the last minute.

In the aftermath, the alien ship retreats from Earth, while the fallen Gila's energy is fully neutralized. Abraham is sent to a facility outside Santa Fe, New Mexico, where he can live in peace. Marcos gives Linda exclusive rights to study him, and she accepts Noah's offer to join her.

== Cast ==
- Eric Roberts as National Security Advisor Ethan Marcos
- Arianna Scott as Dr. Linda Murphy
- Katie Sereika as Eva Kuleshov
- Narek Kirakossian as Secretary Pudovkin
- Irina Pickard as Chemist Eisenstein
- Shayne Hartigan as Lab Tech Jones / Blair
- Rudy Bentz as Noah Murphy
- Sir Gregory Salonis as St. Peterson / Harker
- R.J. Wagner as General Delaney
- Gregg Marcantel as General Reynolds
- Malcolm Green as Marine Corporal Myers
- Quinn Baker as Specialist Sergeant Shaw
- Buck Burns as MP McDaniels
- Lynda Lopez as News Anchor
- Bolnarat as Himself
- Malcolm T. Green as Marine Meyers
- Jonah as Himself
- Alexander Nunn as Scientist VO

== Release ==
Ape vs. Monster was released on VOD on April 30, 2021. A DVD release by Greenfield Media followed on September 27, 2021. The film has only been released on Blu-ray in Germany.

== Reception ==
Ape vs. Monster was received generally poorly, receiving 2.1/10 stars on IMDb.

== Sequels and spinoff ==
=== Sequels ===
A sequel, titled Ape vs. Mecha Ape, was released on March 24, 2023. In it, the United States military creates a giant mechanical ape, but it escapes and wreaks havoc, leading them to release the captive Abraham to neutralize the threat before it destroys downtown Chicago.

A second sequel, titled Ape x Mecha Ape: New World Order, was released on April 5, 2024. A mockbuster of Godzilla x Kong: The New Empire, it reveals the origin of the alien substance in Ape vs. Monster to be the blood of an extraterrestrial, Cthulhu-like creature named Kulalu; when a cult of high-ranking government officials cause Kulalu to awaken on Earth, Abraham must team up with Mecha Ape Mk. II in order to defeat it.

=== Spinoff ===
The creatures from Ape vs. Monster appear in the 2022 spinoff crossover film 2025 Armageddon alongside other creatures from films by The Asylum.
