= Brad Mills =

Brad Mills may refer to:

- Brad Mills (manager) (born 1957), bench coach for the Cincinnati Reds
- Brad Mills (pitcher) (born 1985), baseball pitcher
- Bradley Mills (born 1983), Canadian professional ice hockey player for the Binghamton Senators
- Brad Mills (actor), an actor on 3-Headed Shark Attack
