= Paranormal Entity =

- DVD cover art
- Directed by: Shane Van Dyke
- Screenplay by: Shane Van Dyke
- Produced by: David Michael Latt
- Starring: Shane Van Dyke; Erin Marie Hogan; Fia Perera; Norman Saleet
- Cinematography: Akis Konstantakopoulos
- Edited by: Bill Parker
- Distributed by: The Asylum
- Release date: December 22, 2009
- Running time: 90 minutes
- Country: United States
- Language: English

Paranormal Entity is a 2009 American found footage supernatural horror film written, directed by and starring Shane Van Dyke (in his feature directorial debut) and produced by The Asylum in 2009. It is one of many films dubbed as a "mockbuster", a movie designed to capitalize on the success of a more popular film. Paranormal Entity is a knockoff of the successful low-budget horror film Paranormal Activity. The film was followed by indirect sequels 8213: Gacy House in 2010, Anneliese: The Exorcist Tapes in 2011, and 100 Ghost Street: The Return of Richard Speck in 2012. The film's premise is that of a series of allegedly factual surveillance videos documenting the downward spiral and eventual supernatural rape and murder of a woman named Samantha Finley.

== Plot ==
A notice reveals that a young man named Thomas Finley has been convicted of raping and killing his sister, and murdering Dr. Edgar Lauren, a psychic. He claimed a demon had committed the murders. He was sent to prison, where he committed suicide.

Thomas, his younger sister Samantha and their mother Ellen believe that Ellen has been making contact with her deceased husband, David. Soon the family claims that a demon is haunting them. At first, they think it is David, but after a series of horrible attacks on Samantha, they suspect otherwise.

One night the camera records Ellen sitting up in bed and leaving her bedroom. She walks into the living room, where she writes something on a piece of paper. She then crumples the paper and walks back down the hallway. Thomas finds the paper under Samantha's pillow and sees that it spells out the word "MARON". Thomas suggests that Ellen and Samantha stay at a hotel while he sets up traps around the house with bells and wire. When the bells ring, Thomas investigates. The wire and bell outside his door are ripped from the wall and thrown at him. Thomas shuts himself in the bedroom and the demon bangs on his door.

Thomas receives a phone call from Ellen, who is in hysterics after the demon apparently followed them and attacked Samantha. Upon returning to the house, Samantha hunches over in pain. Thomas awakens at night and finds his sister missing. He finds the attic ladder hanging down and ascends it to find her standing there in her bra and panties, in a trance. Upon awakening, she is unable to remember what happened.

Thomas asks the previous owner of the house if anyone named Maron ever lived there, but the previous owner does not recognize the name. Thomas hears Samantha screaming and rushes to the bathroom to find her lying topless in the bathtub, severely traumatized. Ellen wakes after hearing thuds from outside. In the living room camera, she is seen standing in the archway with a knife before returning to her bedroom. Thomas wakes up after hearing a door slam shut, and finds that Ellen has slit her wrists, weapon still in hand. She is taken to the hospital.

Thomas and Sam are left at home when psychic, Dr. Edgar Lauren, arrives. He explains that there is a powerful dark entity in the home and that Samantha is the focus of its attention. He says that the entity gained entry into the home when Ellen attempted to contact the spirit of David. Dr. Lauren explains that "maron" is Old Germanic for "nightmare", a creature similar to the incubus, a demon that rapes women in their sleep. The psychic agrees to help evict the entity and the video fades to black.

After a pause, the camera's POV shows the doctor's bleeding head and blank face, fallen on the floor and "looking" toward the lens. Thomas is heard panicking. He grabs the camera after hearing Samantha's scream and runs to her bedroom. The house is in disarray. Thomas finds his sister naked and levitating in her room, covered in blood, being raped by an invisible demon. He drops the camera and runs out of the room to find help. A gurgling noise is heard off-screen, and an unseen figure (heavy breathing can be heard), picks up the camera and focuses it on Samantha's lifeless face.

Thomas is charged with Samantha's rape and death and is sentenced to life. Not long after, he commits suicide.

It is revealed, upon hearing of both her children's deaths, Ellen also commits suicide. It is also revealed that the recording made by Thomas was found in the family's attic one year later.

== Cast ==
- Shane Van Dyke as Thomas Finley
- Erin Marie Hogan as Samantha Finley, Thomas's younger sister
- Fia Perera as Ellen Finley, Thomas abd Samantha's mother
- Norman Saleet as Dr. Edgar Lauren
- Dylan Savige as The Demon

== Reception ==
Criticisms were mostly focused on the script, plot and direction.

== Sequels ==
Three indirect sequels were released, each one year after the other and also to coincide with the Paranormal Activity films, entitled 8213: Gacy House, Anneliese: The Exorcist Tapes and 100 Ghost Street: The Return of Richard Speck. All of these films follow the same elements as the Paranormal Activity films such as the films being a documentary style movie and involves different people experiencing supernatural events from unseen entities.

== See also ==
- Paranormal Activity 2
- Ghostwatch
- Incubus
