= 2012: Supernova =

- Directed by: Anthony Fankhauser
- Written by: Anthony Fankhauser; John Macy; John Willis III
- Produced by: Paul Bales; Stephen Fiske; David Michael Latt; David Rimawi
- Starring: Brian Krause; Heather McComb; Najarra Townsend
- Cinematography: Mark Atkins
- Edited by: Danny Maldonado
- Music by: Chris Ridenhour
- Distributed by: The Asylum
- Release date: October 27, 2009
- Running time: 87 minutes
- Country: United States
- Language: English
- Budget: $200,000

2012: Supernova is a 2009 direct-to-video science fiction disaster film directed by Anthony Fankhauser and starring Brian Krause, Heather McComb, and Najarra Townsend. It was distributed by The Asylum. As with the previous film, titled 2012: Doomsday, 2012: Supernova is a mockbuster of the Roland Emmerich film 2012, which was released a month later. It is the second film in the Asylum's 2012 trilogy though the films have nothing to do with one another. The third film is titled 2012: Ice Age which was released in 2011.

== Premise ==
When a star gone supernova threatens to destroy Earth, an astrophysicist puts together a dangerous and desperate plan to shield Earth from the destructive burst of radiation heading toward it.

== Cast ==
- Brian Krause as Kelvin
- Heather McComb as Laura
- Najarra Townsend as Tina
- Allura Lee as Dr. Kwang Ke
- Alan Poe as Dzerzhinsky
- Londale Theus as Captain Henreaux
- Stephen Schneider as Captain James Moto
- Rob Ullett as NASA Official
- Dana Tomasko as NASA Technician
- Rick L. Dean as NASA Technician
- Pete Angelikus as NASA Technician
- William Joseph Hutchins as NASA Technician
- Doug Newman as NASA Technician
- Jeff Crabtree as NASA Technician
- Maus Jackson as NASA Technician
- J. Dedman as USAF Agent
- Henrik Ej Hermiz as USAF Agent
- Malcom Scott as The President
- Brittian D. Soderberg as NASA Soldier
- Andrew Fetty as NASA Soldier
- Bryan Dodds as NASA Soldier
- Dorothy Drury as Agent Dunne
- Stafford Mills as Farmer Brown
- Kevin Ashworth as Carter
- Stephen Blackehart as Agent Greene
- Matthew Farhat as Lieutenant Shalah
- Melissa Osborne as Eden

== Reception ==
HorrorNews.net reviewed the film, writing that "Frankhauser's depiction of what will happen in 2012 is action packed, but lacks in character development and believability impedes the likability of the movie to a certain extent".

== Sequel ==
Another sequel was released the following year entitled 2012: Ice Age and borrowing elements from another of Roland Emmerich's films, The Day After Tomorrow.
