= Ardennes Fury =

- Directed by: Joseph J. Lawson
- Written by: Stephen Llorens
- Produced by: David Michael Latt; David Rimawi; Paul Bales
- Starring: Tom Stedham; Bill Voorhees; Tino Struckman; Lawrence C. Garnell Jr.; Lauren Vera; Yaron Urbas
- Cinematography: Richard Vialet
- Edited by: Rob Pallatina
- Music by: Chris Ridenhour
- Distributed by: The Asylum
- Release date: November 11, 2014
- Running time: 87 minutes
- Country: United States
- Language: English

Ardennes Fury (also known as Battle of the Ardennes: Fury) is a 2014 direct-to-video war film directed by Joseph J. Lawson. The film, produced by B-movie film company The Asylum, stars Tom Stedham, Bill Voorhees, Tino Struckman, Lawrence C. Garnell Jr., Lauren Vera, Yaron Urbas. Ardennes Fury is a mockbuster of Fury.

== Premise ==
In the late Autumn of 1944 before the Battle of the Bulge campaign, an American tank unit gets trapped behind enemy lines. The Allies' Operation Ardennes Fury is about to commence when the tank's commander moves to rescue innocent children and nuns from a nearby orphanage.

== Cast ==
- Tom Stedham as Sergeant Lance Dawson
- Bill Voorhees as Private C.K. Luinstra
- Tino Struckman as Major Heston Zeller
- Lawrence C. Garnell Jr. as Sergeant Nathaniel Rose
- Lauren Vera as Sister Claudette
- Yaron Urbas as Corporal Michael Griffin
- Analiese Anderson as Mother Mary
- Trey Hough as Sergeant Freddie McNay
- Elvin Manges as Corporal Donald Gunderson
- Kyle Golden as Private Richard Somers

== Release ==
Ardennes Fury was released direct-to-DVD on November 11, 2014.

=== Critical reception ===
Like many of The Asylum's "mockbusters", the film received universally negative reviews.
