= Karrueche Tran =

American socialite and actress (born 1988)

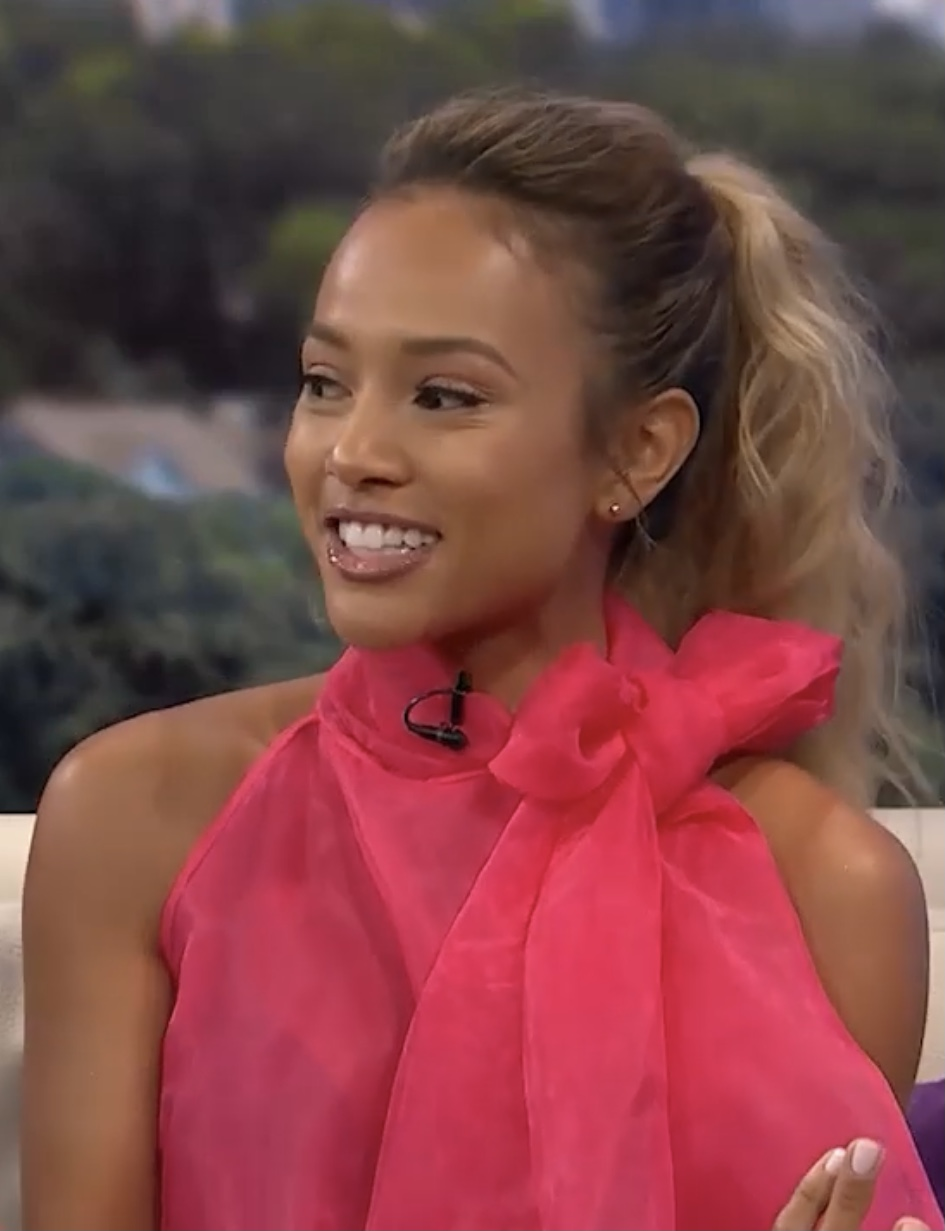
- Tran in 2019
- Born: Karrueche Tientrese Tran; May 17, 1988 (age 38); Los Angeles, California, U.S.
- Occupations: Socialite; actress; entrepreneur
- Partners: Chris Brown (2011–2015); Victor Cruz (2017–2021)

Karrueche Tientrese Tran (/kəˈruːtʃi ˈtræn/ kə-ROO-chee TRAN; born May 17, 1988) is an American socialite and actress. Tran first gained public recognition for dating R&B singer Chris Brown.

Tran is also known for starring as Virginia Loc on the TNT series Claws and for starring as Vivian Johnson in the web series The Bay (2013–2016), for which she won Daytime Emmy for Outstanding Performance by a Lead Actress in a Daytime Fiction Program at the 2021 Daytime Emmy Awards. Her win made her the first person of Asian Pacific American descent to win an Emmy for Lead Actress or Actor. She received two additional Daytime Emmy Awards from production credits shared by the entire cast and crew when The Bay won Outstanding Digital Daytime Drama Series in 2016 and 2017.

== Early life ==
Tran is a native of Los Angeles, California. She was raised by her Vietnamese mother and Jamaican godmother. Her father is Jamaican American. Tran identifies as biracial, and has a younger maternal half-brother.

== Career ==
=== 2009–2014: Early career and The Bay ===
From 2009 to 2012, she worked at Nordstrom located at the Westfield Topanga mall in Canoga Park, California. She first gained public attention when she began dating R&B singer Chris Brown in 2010.

Around that time, Tran began modeling for local brands. She was the face of Lady Crooks, the women's division under the streetwear brand Crooks and Castles for their Summer 2013 collection. She also began working on her own clothing line, The Kill. Tran gained wider prominence after starring as Vivian Johnson on the Emmy award-winning web series The Bay from 2013 to 2016. For producing the series, she won three Daytime Emmy Awards.

In 2014, Tran appeared in volume one of the photography book, Love West Coast Girls, by celebrity photographer Mike Miller. That same year, she hosted the BET Awards red carpet and multiple events during the official BET Weekend. She had previously co-hosted the BET show 106 & Park. Tran's TV One movie, The Fright Nite Files, was also screened that year.

=== 2015–present: Film and television roles ===
In 2015, Tran was featured in the Spring/Summer lookbook for French-based athletic brand Le Coq Sportif. She also appeared on the covers of several magazines, including Rolling Out, Flaunt Magazine, Ouch Magazine, The Hundreds, Cliche Magazine, Bleu Magazine and Annex Magazine, including two feature stories on ELLE.com. Her work led her to a contract with Wilhelmina Models LA in 2015.

Tran's first featured film, 3-Headed Shark Attack, was released that summer, followed by the lead in the short film PrXde. She later gained recognition for her performance as Vanessa Ivy in the fashion web series by StyleHaul titled Vanity, sponsored by the makeup brand Maybelline.

After supporting roles in A Weekend with the Family and The Nice Guys, Tran landed the lead in Only for One Night, portraying Chloe, a married woman whose perfect life deals with betrayal when her sister drugs her husband and sleeps with him. All three movies were released in 2016. That same year, she partnered up with ColourPop Cosmetics to release the limited edition cosmetic collaboration, KaePop.

After her departure from The Bay, Tran began co-starring in TNT's Claws (2017), a TV series about five diverse manicurists working at the Nail Artisan of Manatee County salon in South Florida. Tran was selected for her ability to bring "a layer [...] that wasn’t one note" to the character, according to showrunner Janine Sherman Barrois.

In October 2019, it was announced that Tran had joined the cast of FOX's Deputy in a recurring role as Genevieve. In 2020, she returned to The Bay for its sixth season. In 2021, Tran won the Daytime Emmy for Outstanding Performance by a Lead Actress in a Daytime Fiction Program, making her the first person of Asian Pacific American descent to win an Emmy.

In 2022, she became the host of Upcycle Nation, a Fuse TV competition show focused on sustainable fashion. In 2023, Tran replaced Chanel West Coast as one of the co-stars of the MTV show Ridiculousness.

In 2024, Tran launched an OnlyFans account to sell pictures of her feet. Later in 2024, Tran portrayed rookie police officer Regina Smith in the Lifetime film Searching for a Serial Killer: The Regina Smith Story as part of its "Ripped from the Headlines" feature films.

== Personal life ==
Tran began dating R&B singer Chris Brown in 2010, while working as a personal shopper. Tran first gained public recognition through her relationship with Brown, as their relationship attracted considerable media attention. The couple briefly split when Brown reconciled with his ex-girlfriend, singer Rihanna in 2012.

In 2013, Tran reconciled with Brown. That January, she spoke about their relationship, stating: “At the end of the day, he will always be my friend. We'll always care about each other". However they broke up in 2015. In February 2017, Tran was granted a 5-year restraining order against Brown by a judge in Santa Monica, after she shared text messages and voicemails in court where Brown threatened her and demanded she return diamond rings and other gifts given during their relationship. After testifying under oath, she was granted a 5-year restraining order against Brown in June 2017. Brown did not appear at the restraining order hearing and publicly denied the allegations. In 2017, Tran briefly dated Migos rapper Quavo. From 2017 to 2021, Tran was in a long-term relationship with former NFL player Victor Cruz. As of 2025, Tran is in a relationship with former NFL player Deion Sanders.

Tran is a Christian.

== Filmography ==
=== Film ===
Year	Title	Role	Notes
2014	The Fright Night Files	Monique	TV movie
2015	3-Headed Shark Attack	Maggie	Video
2015	PrXde	Kat	Short
2016	A Weekend with the Family	Courtney Clancy	
2016	The Nice Guys	Tally-in-Porn	
2016	Only for One Night	Chloe	
2016	Welcome to Willits	Besh	
2018	The Honor List	Sophie Stephens	
2018	Never Heard	Paris	
2019	Child's Play	TiTi's Friend	Short
2019	Jay and Silent Bob Reboot	Con-Ployee #2	
2020	Embattled	Jade Boykins	
2023	House Party	Herself	
2023	Divinity	Nikita	
2024	Searching for a Serial Killer: The Regina Smith Story	Regina Smith	TV movie
2026	Terry McMillian Presents: Preach, Pray, Love	Charlie Jones	TV movie

=== Television ===
Year	Title	Role	Notes
2014	The Dead Diaries	Lisa	Episode: "Massacre"
2014–23	The Bay	Vivian Johnson	Main Cast
2015	Sneaker Shopping	Herself	Episode: "Karrueche"
2015	Iyanla, Fix My Life	Herself	Episode: "Iyanla Exclusive: Karrueche Tran"
2015	Punk'd	Herself	Episode: "Kevin Hart & Karrueche Tran"
2015	Single Ladies	Samantha Gray	Episode: "Build"
2015	Vanity	Vanessa Ivy	Main Cast
2015	Truth be Told	Monica	Episode: "The Wedding"
2016	Catfish	Herself	Episode: "Brandon and McKenna"
2016	Fashion Police	Herself	Episode: "2016 Billboard Music Awards"
2016	Car Matchmaker with Spike Feresten	Herself	Episode: "Karrs for Karrueche"
2016	Relationship Status	Jane	Episode: "The Wedding Party"
2017	The Joker's Wild	Herself/Co-Host	Episode: "Use Your Brain And Make It Rain"
2017–18	Hip Hop Squares	Herself/Panelist	Recurring Panelist: Season 3 & 5
2017–22	Claws	Virginia Loc	Main Cast
2018	Drop the Mic	Herself/Contestant	Episode: "Episode #2.5"
2018	Lip Sync Battle	Herself/Competitor	Episode: "Karrueche Tran vs. Deon Cole"
2019–23	Ridiculousness	Herself	Recurring Guest
2020	Celebrity Game Face	Herself	Episode: "Sweatsuit Charades and Donut Holes"
2020	Deputy	Genevieve	Recurring Cast
2020	The Last O.G.	Herself	Episode: "Ballin"
2020	Queen of Stylez	Herself	Episode: "You've Never Seen A Wig Like This. Forreal."
2021	Cardi Tries	Herself	Episode: "Cardi Tries Giving Tuesday"
2021	We Stay Looking	Aisha James	Episode: "Red Flavored Drink"
2021	Games People Play	Eden Lazlo	Main Cast: Season 2
2022	Upcycle Nation	Herself/Host	Main Host
2022–23	Bel-Air	Ivy	Recurring Cast
2025–26	The Chi	Zuri	Recurring Cast: Seasons 7–8

== Awards ==
Year	Award	Category	For/Role	Work	Result
2016	Daytime Emmy Awards	Outstanding Digital Daytime Drama Series	Producer (shared credit)	The Bay	Won
2016	Burbank International Film Festival	Best Short, New Media	Producer (shared credit)	The Bay	Won
2016	HollyWeb Festival	Best Online Soap	Producer (shared credit)	The Bay	Won
2016	Indie Series Award	Drama	Best Supporting Actress	The Bay	Nominated
2017	Daytime Emmy Awards	Outstanding Digital Daytime Drama Series	Producer (shared credit)	The Bay	Won
2017	Indie Series Award	Drama	Best Supporting Actress	The Bay	Nominated
2021	Daytime Emmy Awards	Daytime Fiction Program	Outstanding Performance by a Lead Actress	The Bay	Won
