= The Twisters (film) =

2024 American film by The Asylum

- Directed by: Michael Su
- Written by: Jeffery Anderson
- Produced by: Paul Bales; David Michael Latt; James Mahoney; Brendan Petrizzo; David Rimawi
- Starring: Tiffany; Mark Justice; Kayla Fields; Sofia Riba; Paul Logan
- Cinematography: Michael Su
- Edited by: Rob Pallatina
- Music by: Tim Carlos; Mikel Shane Prather
- Production company: Atomic Blonde Productions
- Distributed by: The Asylum
- Release date: December 4, 2024
- Running time: 86 minutes
- Country: United States
- Language: English

The Twisters is a 2024 American action film directed by Michael Su and produced by The Asylum. It is a mockbuster of the film Twisters.

== Premise ==
Chaos rages as dozens of tornadoes descend on the Midwestern United States, forcing the deployment of a specialized scientific team.

== Cast ==
- Tiffany as Dr. Janet Evans
- Mark Justice as Dr. James Garland
- Kayla Fields as Dr. Erica Garland
- Sofia Riba as Claudia Santiago
- Paul Logan as Doug Cameron
- Curtis Strong as General Murphy
- Corbin Timbrook as Professor Bennett
- Vinney Pugliese as Steve Manley
- Donna Kim as Captain Morales

== Reception ==
A review at Voices From the Balcony concluded: "The Twisters is slightly better than the usual film from The Asylum. While it’s as brain dead as most of their films, it never bogs down in dialogue to the point where it gets boring so while it may be dumb, it frequently manages to be dumb fun."
