= 100 Ghost Street: The Return of Richard Speck =

- Film poster
- Directed by: Martin Andersen
- Written by: Nancy Leopardi
- Produced by: Nancy Leopardi
- Starring: Jennifer Robyn Jacobs; Jim Shipley; Tony Besson; Jackie Moore; Hayley Derryberry; Adam LaFramboise; Mike Holley; Chance Harlem, Jr.; Nancy Leopardi; Steve Bencich
- Cinematography: Luca Del Puppo
- Edited by: Anders Hoffmann
- Production company: The Asylum
- Release date: July 24, 2012
- Running time: 84 minutes
- Country: United States
- Language: English
- Budget: $150,000

100 Ghost Street: The Return of Richard Speck, or Paranormal Entity 4: The Awakening, is a 2012 supernatural horror film written and directed by Martin Andersen and distributed by The Asylum. It is a mockbuster of the film Paranormal Activity 4.

== Plot ==
Paranormal investigators Jackie, Adam, Sarah, Dave, Jim, Jen, and Earl head to the abandoned South Chicago Community Hospital where mass murderer Richard Speck killed eight student nurses from July 13–14, 1966. Hoping to document any paranormal activity, they record the experience using various cameras. Earl stands guard outside as the others head inside. He soon hears a strange noise coming from a large pipe, and sticks his head inside to see what it is, becoming decapitated by an unseen force. In the building, the group hears Sarah screaming, and find her facing a wall with scratches on her arms, and decide to let her rest in one of the bedrooms. Adam is soon dragged off, and killed by an unseen force, which is revealed to be the ghost of Richard Speck when it invades Sarah's room, and briefly undresses her before killing her. The group soon realizes there is something in the building with them, and attempt to escape, finding all the doors and windows locked with the entrance gate closed off.

The group decides to find the keys to unlock the gate, although they had left them with Adam. Using a trail of blood, and an RC car, they find Adam's body in a small crawlspace, and Jackie goes to retrieve the keys. As she does, however, the ghost kills her. The others encounter maintenance worker Mike on the roof, who decides to use a pair of bolt cutters he has to break through the gate. However, Mike must retrieve them from his tools in the basement, although when he goes to retrieve them, the ghost kills him. The ghost then hangs Dave, and chases Jen into a bedroom where she successfully hides under a bed. She reunites with Jim, and they find a small crawlspace to escape through. However, a claustrophobic Jim refuses to go through, and Jen watches in horror as he is killed by the ghost. Jen crawls her way outside, although as she's walking away from the building, the ghost arrives, and kills her as well before she drops the camera, ending the film.

== Cast ==
- Jackie Moore as Jackie
- Adam LaFramboise as Adam
- Hayley Derryberry as Sarah
- Mike Holley as Mike
- Tony Besson as Dave
- Jim Shipley as Jim
- Jennifer Robyn Jacobs as Jen
- Chance Harlem, Jr. as Earl
- Nancy Leopardi as Ghost (Voice)
- Steve Bencich as Ghost (Voice)

== Reception ==
Unlike the previous three films, reviews for 100 Ghost Street: The Return of Richard Speck were slightly more positive, but still remained very negative overall. Scott Foy of Dread Central rated the film 3/5 stars and called it the best found footage film made by The Asylum. Culture Crypt gave the movie a review score of 30/100.
