= Asian School Girls =

- Directed by: Lawrence Silverstein
- Screenplay by: Tim Culley
- Produced by: David Michael Latt; David Rimawi; Paul Bales
- Starring: Minnie Scarlet; Sam Aotaki; Catherine Hyein Kim; Devin Schultz; Belle Hengsathorn
- Production company: The Asylum
- Distributed by: The Asylum
- Release date: April 15, 2014
- Running time: 91 minutes
- Country: United States
- Language: English

Asian School Girls is a 2014 American action film produced by The Asylum and directed by Lawrence Silverstein. The film stars Minnie Scarlet, Sam Aotaki, Catherine Hyein Kim, Devin Lung, and Belle Hengsathorn. It received very negative film critic reviews.

== Plot ==
Four Asian school girls are drugged and gang raped by a Los Angeles crime syndicate. When one of the girls commits suicide, the other three plot their scheme against the syndicate to avenge her death. They take jobs as strippers in order to acquire $5,000 worth of weapons and get closer to their targets, so that they can go on a murderous revenge rampage.

== Cast ==
- Sam Aotaki as Hannah
- Catherine Hyein Kim as May
- Minnie Scarlet as Vivian
- Belle Hengsathorn as Suzy
- Andray Jackson as Jack
- Alan Pietruzewski as Bannion
- Andrew Callahan as Wes
- John C. Epperson as Martin
- Kevin Ging as Gary
- Xin Sarith Wuku as Ray
- Lucas Davis as Steve
- Devin Schultz as Wu Hung
- William Thomas Jones as Charles
- Roger Lim as Mr. Kang
- Rich Grosso as Rex
- Jeff Houkal as Rocco

== Reception ==
Rotten Tomatoes gives the film an approval rating of 8% based on 9 reviews; the average rating is 3.5/10. The site's consensus states: "Could have been a fun revenge flick but too exploitive and cheap."
