= 40 Days and Nights =

- Blu-Ray disc cover
- Directed by: Peter Geiger
- Written by: H. Perry Horton
- Produced by: David Michael Latt; David Rimawi; Paul Bales
- Starring: Monica Keena; Alex Carter; Christianna Carmine; Emily Sandifer; Mitch Lerner
- Cinematography: Ulf Soderqvist
- Edited by: Rachel Anderson-Lebron
- Music by: Chris Ridenhour
- Production company: The Asylum
- Distributed by: The Asylum
- Release date: November 27, 2012
- Running time: 90 minutes
- Country: United States
- Language: English

40 Days and Nights is a 2012 disaster film loosely based on the 2009 film 2012. Produced by The Asylum and directed by Peter Geiger, the film stars Monica Keena, Alex Carter, Christianna Carmine, Emily Sandifer, and Mitch Lerner. It is a modern take on Noah's Ark and the Genesis flood narrative.

== Premise ==
When a massive tectonic shift triggers a tsunami capable of swallowing whole continents, the military creates an ark capable of holding only 50,000 people and the DNA of every species possible while the storm consumes most of the world.

== Cast ==
- Monica Keena as Tessa
- Alex Carter as John
- Christianna Carmine as Lynn
- Emily Sandifer as Maddie
- Mitch Lerner as Freeman
