= Barely Legal (film) =

2011 film by Jose Montesinos

- Barely Legal movie poster
- Directed by: Jose Montesinos
- Written by: Naomi Selfman
- Produced by: David Michael Latt; David Rimawi; Paul Bales; Christopher Ray
- Starring: Jeneta St. Clair; Lisa Younger; Melissa Johnston
- Cinematography: Ben Demaree
- Distributed by: The Asylum
- Release date: July 26, 2011
- Running time: 90 minutes
- Country: United States
- Language: English
- Budget: $3,000,000

Barely Legal is a 2011 sex comedy film by The Asylum, directed by Jose Montesinos and starring Jeneta St. Clair, Lisa Younger and Melissa Johnston.

== Plot ==
Sue, Cheryl and Lexi are three college freshmen-to-be who have been best friends since learning they were born on the same day. They set out to lose their virginity on their eighteenth. They throw a large poolside party at Sue's house hoping to "pop their cherries" before the day and night is over. But they find that losing their virginity is easier said than done as all three of them embark on a series of raunchy and humorous quests to do so.

Cheryl tells her friends she is finally going to "make it" with her long-term boyfriend Jake. But after she catches him cheating on her with another girl, she embarks on a string of unsuccessful hook ups. First, Cheryl tries to make Jake jealous by hooking up with a friendly college guy, named Eric, but he leaves when he learns that she is only using him as "revenge sex" against her boyfriend. Next, she attempts to seduce the local blind kid Frank, whose seeing-eye dog has an encounter with her instead.

Lexi tries to find a certain "J.J." who gave her "oral pleasure" on the previous day, but as the deed was done from behind, she does not know who it is. She sets out to find J.J. any way she can by coming onto every guy she meets with the first name of 'J', from Jeremy to Jake to John.

The naive and religious Sue first tries to seduce her Bible study classmate Chris, who rejects her advances, claiming that his devotion lays with Jesus (which is a coded message that he happens to be homosexual). Dejected, Sue becomes hooked on masturbation as she pleasures herself with everything that vibrates in her house, from vibrators, vacuum handles, remote controllers, pulsating shower heads, to electric toothbrushes.

At the end of the party, none of the three girls lose their virginity despite having sexual encounters with various persons, animals and objects. Deciding that it was not meant to be, they plan to go their separate ways. However, Lexi discovers that J.J. is actually her old high school classmate, named Johanna, who always had a crush on Lexi. Realizing that she might really be a repressed lesbian, Lexi decides that she does not need sex with men, and immediately consummates her romance with Johanna.

After finally breaking up with her cheating boyfriend, Cheryl drives to the house of her party guy Eric to plead with him for a second chance. Eric accepts Cheryl's apology and agrees to keep in touch as he leaves to go back to college.

After cleaning up the last of the mess left over from the party at her house, Sue meets a friendly Hispanic guy riding by on a motorcycle outside her house who asks her for directions to a church where she frequently attends. When the guy introduces himself as Jesús, Sue sees it as a sign from God. Jesús asks Sue if she would like a ride on his motorcycle to their church, and she accepts.

== Cast ==
- Jeneta St. Clair as Cheryl
- Lisa Younger as Lexi
- Melissa Johnston as Sue
- Morgan Benoit as Jake
- Myko Olivier as Eric
- Matthew Keoki Miller as Frank
- Joy Amber Stephens as Johanna
- Irec Hargrove as Rod
- Wolfie Trausch as Chris
- Andre Meadows as Troy
- Lee Doud as Troy
- Alex Arleo as Jeremy
- Alex Zanger as Jesús
