= Zombie Shark =

2014 film directed by Brian Armstrong

Zombie Shark is a docufiction program by Discovery Channel for the 2014 Shark Week. The premise of the program is that sharks can be brought into a state of tonic immobility (a kind of trance) by flipping them on their back, and that this characteristic might explain how a supposed series of Great white shark killings occurred: the suggestion is that Orcas have developed that skill and are thus able to kill large numbers of sharks. Zombie Shark, indeed much of Discovery's 2014 programming, was panned by critics, with the Houston Press claiming that Discovery had jumped the shark.
