= Apocalypse Pompeii =

- DVD cover
- Directed by: Ben Demaree
- Screenplay by: Jacob Cooney & Bill Hanstock
- Story by: Steve Bevilacqua
- Produced by: David Michael Latt; David Rimawi; Paul Bales
- Starring: Adrian Paul; Jhey Castles; John Rhys-Davies; Dylan Vox; Dan Cade
- Cinematography: Ben Demaree
- Edited by: Ana Florit
- Music by: Joseph Metcalfe
- Production company: The Asylum
- Distributed by: The Asylum
- Release date: February 18, 2014
- Running time: 87 minutes
- Country: United States
- Language: English

Apocalypse Pompeii is a 2014 American disaster film produced by The Asylum and directed by Ben Demaree. The film stars Adrian Paul, Jhey Castles, John Rhys-Davies, Dylan Vox, Dan Cade. It was filmed in Sofia, Bulgaria, and Pompeii, Italy.

The film was released direct-to-DVD on 8 February 2014. In the tradition of The Asylum's catalog, Apocalypse Pompeii is a mockbuster of the Paul W. S. Anderson film Pompeii.

== Premise ==
When a former Special Ops commando visits Pompeii, Italy, his wife and daughter are trapped as Mount Vesuvius erupts with massive force. While his family fights to survive the deadly onslaught of heat and lava, he enlists his former teammates in a daring operation beneath the ruins of Pompeii.

== Cast ==
- Adrian Paul as Jeff Pierce
- Jhey Castles as Lynne Pierce
- Georgina Beedle as Mykaela Pierce
- John Rhys-Davies as Colonel Carlo Dillard
- Dylan Vox as Kal
- Dan Cade as Cade
- Constatine Trendafilov as Gianni
- Assen Kukushev as Naveen
- Alexandra Petrova-Emisti as Rashida
- Yordam Yositov as Rosso
- Harry Anichkin as Italian Colonel
- Vrunda Patel as Christina
- Jonas Talkington as Paul
- Ralitsa Paskaleva as Alita
- J.R. Esposito as Smith
- Michael Straub as "Herricane"
- Ivan Panayotov as Soldier
- Malin Marinov as Police Officer
- Owen Davis as Pilot
- Plamen Petkov as Man 1
- Deyan Tsuyathov as Man 2
- Boris Vashev as Man 3
- Lolita Nikolova as Woman
- Iveta-Luis Contreras as Mother
- Velislav Pavlov as Little Girl's Father
- Elayah Roth as Little Girl
- Ivo Tonchev as Businessman

== Production ==
This film marks the directing debut for Ben Demaree. Previously he had been a cinematographer on numerous films, including the Sharknado franchise. Shooting took place for 12 days in Sofia, Bulgaria during the month of September, and then a few splinter unit days at the real Pompeii in Italy.

Most of the crew were local hires, with only a handful of people flown in from the US, including the sound mixer and steadicam operator. The cast was a mix of US, UK, and local Bulgarians. There were financial advantages to filming in Bulgaria, allowing the film to do bigger stunts including full body burns, setting cars on fire, and using cork bombs for explosions from 'flying volcanic rock'.

== Reception ==
Reviewer Frank Veenstra gave the film 4 out of 10 stars saying "The writing isn't all that great and to be honest, it's a very ridiculous movie but at the same time, it's also a pretty creative one."

Martin Hafer of Influx gave the film one out of five stars, citing that "the plot is stupid and the characters are shallow—often coming off as caricatures."
