= Anneliese: The Exorcist Tapes =

2011 American film

- DVD cover
- Directed by: Jude Gerard Prest
- Starring: Gerold Wunstel; Kai Cofer; Christopher Karl Johnson; Nikki Muller
- Cinematography: Prema Ball
- Edited by: Prema Ball
- Distributed by: The Asylum
- Release date: March 1, 2011
- Running time: 91 minutes
- Country: United States
- Languages: English; German
- Budget: $100,000

Anneliese: The Exorcist Tapes, or Paranormal Entity 3: The Exorcist Tapes, is a 2011 American found footage horror film directed by Jude Gerard Prest and distributed by The Asylum. It is based on the real-life exorcism of Anneliese Michel, a young woman thought to have been possessed. It is also a mockbuster of the film Paranormal Activity 3.

The film was released direct-to-video on March 1, 2011.

== Cast ==
- Gerold Wunstel as Pastor Ernest Alt
- Kai Cofer as Dr. Frederick Gruber
- Christopher Karl Johnson as Father Renz
- Nikki Muller as Anneliese Michel
- Yaz Canli as Sandy
- Robert Shampain as Dr. Kenneth Landers
- Korey Simeone as Steve Parker
- Annette Remter as The Original Anne Michel
- David Reynolds as Josef Michel

== Release ==
The film premiered on DVD on March 1, 2011 in the United States, which includes the film itself and the actual video footage. In Australia, the film received a DVD release on September 21, 2011. In the UK, Anchor Bay Entertainment released the film on DVD on October 17, 2011 under the name Paranormal Entity 3: The Exorcist Tapes.

In Germany, it was released on Blu-ray under the name Der Exorzismus der Anneliese M. on July 28, 2011.
