= 5-Headed Shark Attack =

2017 film

- Film Poster
- Screenplay by: Stephen Meier; Daniel Lawlor; Sean P. Hale
- Story by: Jacob Cooney; Bill Hanstock
- Directed by: Nico De Leon
- Starring: Chris Bruno; Nikki Howard; Lindsay Sawyer; Jeffrey Holsman; Chris Costanzo
- Composers: Chris Ridenhour; Christopher Cano
- Country of origin: United States
- Original language: English

Production
- Executive producer: David Rimawi
- Producers: David Michael Latt; Paul Bales
- Cinematography: Nico De Leon
- Editors: Christopher Roth; Rob Pallatina
- Running time: 90 min.
- Production company: The Asylum

Original release
- Network: Syfy
- Release: July 30, 2017

5-Headed Shark Attack is a 2017 American made-for-television action film produced by The Asylum in association with Syfy. The film is the third installment in the Multi-Headed Shark Attack film series, following 2-Headed Shark Attack and 3-Headed Shark Attack and preceding 6-Headed Shark Attack, with this film featuring both a four-headed and five-headed shark.

== Plot ==
Off Isla Palomino, Puerto Rico, two photographers and four models are mid-photo shooting on a yacht and in the water when a shark's dorsal fin breaches the sea's surface nearby. They begin photographing the shark, not realizing it is swimming toward them until it is too late and a massive 4-headed shark bursts from the water, devouring everyone on board the yacht. Puerto Rican Police Captain Sterling and his Deputy Black later report to the yacht, board it, and find the passengers missing. On the photographer's camera, the officers find blurry images of the 4-headed shark as it is about to eat the passengers.

Captain Sterling and Black seek the advice of Dr. Angie Yost, a marine biologist from the Puerto Rico Aquarium. Yost is pressured by the aquarium's owner, Thaddeus Marshall, to lie and say that the photos are likely a distortion and that the creature does not exist. Marshall requires Yost and her interns, Lindsay, Cait, Ram, and Sean, to embark with him on the aquarium's boat as Marshal intends to catch the shark before it is discovered and put in a new aquarium exhibit. They are successful in luring the shark to their location, although Sean is knocked overboard and eaten. They return to the mainland and report Sean's death to Capt. Sterling and Deputy Black, who debate closing the beaches.

The shark sinks a small fishing boat and feeds on the fishermen, then finds some divers and quickly makes a meal of them. Meanwhile, Marshall has convinced Dr. Yost to contract a local fisherman experienced in shark hunting named Red (an old flame of Yost's) to help them catch the shark. Red agrees to Marshall's offer of double pay, and the three of them set sail along with Lindsay, Ram, and Cait. They lure the shark to the bay using sonar, and an officer is eaten. The shark then knocks Lindsay off Red's boat and eats her. Red shoots the shark with a sonar harpoon, and it flees. The shark mutates— its tail grows a mouth and becomes a fifth head. Red returns to shore, and they meet up with Sterling and Black.

At Playa Aviones, a surfing competition is about to start. The 5-headed shark appears and eats several surfers, injuring others. Red and Yost's crew, along with the police, go to the beach and resolve to use recorded dolphin calls to scare the shark to a specific area and then use dynamite to kill the shark. Captain Sterling and Black follow Red's boat out to sea on their own police boat. Red and Yost are able to attract the shark and use the dolphin recordings, which causes it to attack the police boat's propellers and eat Deputy Black. Red and Yost drop the dynamite in the chum-filled water, but the 5-headed shark does not eat it, and the single-headed shark instead swallows it, absorbing the blast. The shark feeds on the remains and then attacks the boat, knocking Cait off. Ram jumps in and saves her, and Marshall shoots the shark with a harpoon. The 5-headed shark turns away, and the rope attached to the harpoon wraps around Marshall's foot and pulls him into the water, where the shark eats him.

Needing rescue, they radio for an airlift. The helicopter arrives shortly after, but the 5-headed shark bursts from the water and destroys the transport before it can reach the boat. The helicopter sinks after crashing into the sea and takes the shark with it, pinning it to the seabed temporarily. Red grabs several depth charges he has stored in his boat along with a massive fishing hook, which he fastens to the depth charges. When the shark manages to free itself, it attacks the boat, but Red jumps overboard with the hook and explosives and stabs the hook into the back of the shark. The 5-headed shark swims away from the ship and is blown up offscreen. Red emerges from the water, and Yost helps him up. The four survivors rejoice.

== Cast ==
- Chris Bruno as "Red", Experienced fisherman, shark hunter, and diver
- Nikki Howard as Dr. Angie Yost, Marine biologist at the Puerto Rico Aquarium
- Jeffrey Holsman as Thaddeus Marshall, Owner of the Aquarium
- Lindsay Sawyer as Cait, Intern for Dr. Yost
- Chris Costanzo as "Ram", Intern for Dr. Yost
- Amaanda Mendez as Kathy Thomas
- Nicolas Nene as Chief Sterling, Chief of the Puerto Rican police
- Yinoelle Colon as Deputy Angie Black, Sterling's partner
- Jorge Navarro as Sean, Intern for Dr. Yost
- Michelle Cortes as Lindsay, Intern for Dr. Yost
- Ian Daryk as Juan
- Lorna Hernandez as Julia
- Radames Medina as The Photographer
- Stephanie Cruz as Model
- Brent Roske as Captain Jack Morgan

== Release ==
5 Headed Shark Attack was released as the first of six shark themed films premiering on Syfy among their 2017 "Sharknado Week", culminating with the premier of the fifth Sharknado film. This film premiered July 30, 2017. It also saw a DVD release the same year.

== Reception ==
Dread Central reviewed the film in 2017 and called it "a fairly painless watch, but also fairly pointless". The review makes note of the film's stiff performances and lackluster plot and criticizes the misleading synopsis (which describes the shark as a "shaped like a demented starfish"), the low body count, and the shark's growling and ultimately sums up the experience as "Five heads. Three screenwriters. No brains", awarding the film 2/5 stars.

Inverse categorized the series as a sub-genre termed "sharksploitation" and acknowledges that movies like these and Sharknado are "in on the joke".

In a tweet from July 2020, the clip of the shark leaping from the water and destroying the helicopter briefly went viral after it was reported that National Geographic had paid 1 million dollars for the footage of the “rare shark attack”. It was quickly proven false.
