= 2-Headed Shark Attack =

2012 film by Christopher Ray

- DVD cover
- Directed by: Christopher Ray
- Written by: Edward DeRuiter; H. Perry Horton
- Produced by: David Michael Latt
- Starring: Carmen Electra; Charlie O'Connell; Brooke Hogan
- Cinematography: Stuart Brereton
- Edited by: Rob Pallatina
- Music by: Chris Ridenhour
- Production company: The Asylum
- Distributed by: The Asylum
- Release date: January 31, 2012
- Running time: 90 minutes
- Country: United States
- Language: English
- Budget: $1 million

2-Headed Shark Attack is a 2012 American independent thriller film with an ensemble cast by The Asylum, released on January 31, 2012 in the United States. Directed by Christopher Ray, the film stars Carmen Electra, Charlie O'Connell, Brooke Hogan, Joseph Velez, Christina Bach, David Gallegos and Corinne Nobili. The film premiered on September 8, 2012 on Syfy.

== Plot ==
A group of wakeboarders is attacked and devoured by a two-headed great white shark. Meanwhile, Sea King, a Semester at Sea-like ship led by Professor Franklin Babish and his wife Anne, hits a dead shark, which becomes lodged in the boat's propeller, damaging the hull and causing the boat to take on water. The two-headed shark then attacks the boat and breaks the radio antenna, preventing the ship co-captain Laura from summoning help. Babish and the students use a dinghy to take shelter on a nearby deserted atoll, while Anne remains on the Sea King with Laura and the ship's crew, Han and Dikilla. Laura is ripped in half by the two-headed shark.

Meanwhile, Babish and the students explore the atoll. Assembling in an abandoned fishing village, they search for scrap metal to repair the boat. Haley and Alison go swimming topless with Kirk, and are eaten by the two-headed shark. The rest of the group meet up and find two speedboats before an earthquake hits, causing Babish to injure his leg. Dana bandages Babish's leg, while Jeff and Mike accompany him back to the Sea King on the dinghy. En route, Jeff and Mike are eaten by the shark while attempting to swim to the Sea King.

The students find two boats on the island, which Kate and Paul fix. Cole finds a gasoline tank to fuel them, but steals one of the boats together with Ryan, Jamie and Alex. Kate, Paul and Dana follow in the other boat. They are all unaware of the shark, which attacks Cole's boat. Ryan falls into the water and is eaten, alerting the others to the shark's presence. Paul concludes that it is drawn to Cole's boat as it has a bigger engine. Cole bails, and the shark eats Jamie and Alex. When the survivors reach shore, Kate confronts Cole for abandoning Jamie and Alex. Minutes later, the Sea King is abandoned and the survivors meet on the island.

Another earthquake then hits. The group realizes that the earthquakes are actually the atoll collapsing in on itself. They hook up a generator to metal poles and place them in the water to distract the shark while Kate and Cole travel to the Sea King and repair the hull. The plan works until the shark attacks the poles, knocking Han and Dikilla into the water to their deaths. Kate fixes the ship, only for Cole to drive away without her, forcing her to swim back to the atoll. The two-headed shark attacks the Sea King, causing it to sink and send out a distress signal; Cole escapes on a lifeboat but his cellphone rings alerting the shark. The shark attacks and eats Cole. The atoll is sinking too, prompting everyone to flee for their lives.

Kristen and Dana get separated from the group and are devoured. Franklin and Anne also get separated from the group, and after running into a dead-end due to a tsunami approaching the atoll, they share one final kiss as the shark eats them. The rest of the group end up in the water as the tsunami strikes the island. The remaining students swim into the half-sunk village chapel to hide, but the shark breaks in. Lyndsey uses a gun to shoot it, but it eats her. Ethan uses a large wooden cross in the chapel to try attacking it, which also fails as it eats Liza and Michelle. Paul, Kate, and Kirsten climb out the window and escape while Ethan distracts the shark, only to get caught and eaten as well.

The final three discover a gasoline tank, and lure the shark towards it, but fail to ignite it. Kate attempts to stab the shark and is nearly eaten, but Kirsten sacrifices herself instead to blow up the shark. However, only one of the shark's heads get blown off. Kate and Paul find one of the boats and turn it on as a decoy, taking shelter on part of the remaining atoll still above water. The shark attacks the unmanned boat, biting the motor; it explodes, killing the shark. A helicopter arrives, summoned by the distress signal sent out from the sunken Sea King, saving Kate and Paul.

== Cast ==
- Carmen Electra as Dr. Anne Babish
- Charlie O'Connell as Professor Franklin Babish
- Brooke Hogan as Kate
- David Gallegos as Paul
- Christina Bach Norman as Dana
- Geoff Ward as Cole
- Mercedes C. Young as Liza
- Shannan Stewart as Lyndsey
- Tihirah Taliaferro as Michelle
- Michael Dicarluccio as Ethan
- Corinne Nobili as Kirsten
- Ashley Bissing as Kristen
- Lauren Vera as Jamie
- Marckenson Charles as Ryan
- Benjamin James as Alex
- Chase Conner as Kirk
- Anna Jackson as Haley
- Amber English as Alison
- Collin Carmouze as Jeff
- Casey King Leslie as Mike
- Morgan Thompson as Laura
- Gerald Webb as Han
- Anthony E. Valentin as Dikila
- Alexa Score as Wakeboarder #1
- Tiffany Score as Wakeboarder #2
- Alexandre Giraudon as Michel Michel
- Joseph Velez as Man #1
- Curtis Belz as Man #2

== Production ==
The design for the 2-headed shark was detailed in the Monster Man episode "Seeing Double". The original design of the shark had one shark head stacked on top of the other. However, creature designer Cleve Hall pushed to change the design to side-by-side heads.

=== Release ===
The film saw release on DVD with special features including a gag reel in 2012 and on Blu-ray including a "Making of" special feature.

== Soundtrack ==
The film features "More" and "Swallow Whole" by Neon Line. "It's Killing Me to Live" by Matthew Arner. "Jungle Jam" by Yoshi Miyamoto. As well as "Transmission" by Closer to Venus.

== Reception ==
Bloody Disgusting published a review of the film in 2017, arguing that the film attempts to develop some of the extensive list of characters and "makes an effort to give them all unique personalities and character traits, even if there simply isn't enough time devoted to developing them". The review commends the film for also delivering on the titular "2-headed shark attack", but argues that "the over-the-top massacres are good fun at first, but do get stale after a while" and that the film could have benefitted from cutting some characters and making the remaining death scenes more creative.

== Sequels ==
A sequel, 3-Headed Shark Attack, was produced in 2015 by The Asylum and directed by Christopher Ray. The film features Jaason Simmons, Danny Trejo, and wrestler Rob Van Dam in leading roles. The plot revolves around marine biology students encountering a three-headed shark.

Two more films in the series premiered on Syfy, 5-Headed Shark Attack on July 30, 2017 and 6-Headed Shark Attack on August 18, 2018.
