= 3-Headed Shark Attack =

- Directed by: Christopher Ray
- Written by: Jacob Cooney; Bill Hanstock
- Produced by: David Michael Latt; David Rimawi; Paul Bales
- Starring: Danny Trejo; Karrueche Tran; Rob Van Dam; Jaason Simmons; Jena Sims
- Cinematography: Alexander Yellen
- Edited by: Rob Pallatina
- Music by: Chris Ridenhour; Christopher Cano
- Distributed by: The Asylum
- Release date: July 20, 2015
- Running time: 89 minutes
- Country: United States
- Language: English

3-Headed Shark Attack is a 2015 American direct-to-video independent action film developed by The Asylum and starring Danny Trejo, Karrueche Tran and Rob Van Dam. Directed by Christopher Ray, it is a sequel to 2-Headed Shark Attack (2012).

== Plot ==
A 3-headed great white shark attacks an atoll where a group of teenagers is partying, killing all of them except one, Mark, who was on a buoy while the rest of the teens were at the beach. The shark then attacks the Persephone, an underwater research facility studying the Pacific Garbage Patch. The resulting damage causes the facility to explode, killing everybody inside except marine biologists Ted Nelson and Laura Thomas, and a group of activists touring the lab (Greg, Ryan Bennett, Omar, Alison, and college graduate Maggie Peterson, who applied for a job at the facility, and is also Greg's ex-girlfriend). The island the facility is based on begins to flood, and the group swims out to the activists' boat. Laura and Omar are eaten in the process. The others reach the ship; the shark follows them as they drive. Ryan manages to contact fisherman Max Burns over the radio and asks for help. Burns is hesitant to believe them but reluctantly agrees to help them.

The shark begins to head toward a party boat carrying teenagers. The group attempts to warn them, but they are too late: the shark repeatedly rams into the ship, knocking numerous people into the water where they are eaten. The group manages to board the boat in order to help injured passengers, and Maggie and Ted are enlisted as help by passengers Stanley and Rosemarie Grant to help find Rosemarie's boyfriend Howard, who had disappeared into the abandoned dining area during the chaos. They find him and make their way to the top deck, but the shark jumps onto the back of the boat and eats Ted. The group realizes they can no longer stay due to the ship sinking and board the activists' boat with Stanley, Rosemarie, and Howard in tow. Ryan stays behind and attempts to kill the shark by jumping onto its back with an axe. He manages to clip onto the back of the shark, and it soon kills him in retaliation. Running low on fuel, the group is forced to stop at the atoll the shark attacked earlier.

Meanwhile, Burns and his two men attempt to kill the shark, and Burns' men are killed in the process. Burns manages to decapitate the shark's middle head, seemingly killing it. Burns finds the rest of the group. Surprisingly, the shark recovers, grows three more heads in place of the missing head, and eats Burns.

Traumatized by Burns' death, the group runs inland, meeting Mark. Maggie theorizes that the shark is attracted to pollution and that the heads are becoming more aggressive with each other. The group finds two motorboats and begins to drive away from the island. The shark attacks one of them carrying Alison, Rosemarie, Howard, and Mark and kills all of them. Meanwhile, Maggie, Stanley, and Greg manage to attract the shark's attention by throwing garbage bags into the water. Stanley's hand is bitten off in the process. Losing faith, Stanley sacrifices himself by allowing the shark heads to fight over him, resulting in three of the shark's heads getting bitten off, and the shark itself dies of blood loss. Maggie and Greg rekindle their relationship as a helicopter arrives to rescue them.

== Cast ==
- Danny Trejo as Max Burns
- Karrueche Tran as Maggie Peterson
- Jaason Simmons as Dr. Ted Nelson
- Rob Van Dam as Stanley
- Jena Sims as Dr. Laura Thomas
- Brad Mills as Greg
- Scott Reynolds as Ryan Bennett
- Rico Ball as Omar
- Dawn Hamil as Alison
- Bob Constance as Brad
- James Poule as Brian
- Stephen Norris as Steve
- Larry Gamell Jr. as Dr. Leonard
- Mark Nager as Seth
- Preston Simmons as Zach
- Stephen Harwick as Mark
- Jazy Berlin as Polly
- Anna Mercedes Morris as Sasha
- Kayla Campbell as Lindsey
- Brianna Ferris as Rosemarie Grant
- Nestor Fuentes as Maurice
- Carlos Rivera as Howard Grant
- Jacqueline Schmidt as Vanessa
- Eric C. Schmitz as Betts
- Scott Warner as Sandoval
- Cody Lee as Tyler

== Sequels ==
A third film in the series, 5-Headed Shark Attack, was released on Syfy on July 30, 2017, and a fourth film, 6-Headed Shark Attack, was released on August 18, 2018. A 15 year anniversary special titled 15 headed Shark Attack is in the works aiming for a 2027 release.
