= 2012: Doomsday =

2008 film by Nick Everhart

- Directed by: Nick Everhart
- Written by: Nick Everhart
- Story by: Naomi L. Selfman
- Produced by: David Michael Latt
- Starring: Cliff DeYoung; Dale Midkiff; Ami Dolenz; Danae Nason; Joshua Lee; Sara Tomko; Caroline Amiguet
- Cinematography: Mark Atkins
- Edited by: Nick Everhart; Kate Noonan
- Music by: Ralph Rieckermann
- Production company: Faith Films
- Distributed by: The Asylum
- Release date: February 12, 2008
- Country: United States
- Language: English

2012: Doomsday is a 2008 direct-to-video science fiction action film written and directed by Nick Everhart. The film is about scientists who go to Mexico looking for an ancient temple to save humanity on December 21, 2012. It stars Cliff DeYoung, Dale Midkiff, and Ami Dolenz.

== Premise ==
Four strangers use their faith to go to Mexico before the Mayan calendar ends in 2012.

== Cast ==
- Cliff DeYoung as Lloyd
- Dale Midkiff as Dr. Frank Richards
- Ami Dolenz as Susan Reed
- Danae Nason as Sarah
- Joshua Lee as Alex
- Sara Tomko as Wakanna
- Caroline Amiguet as Dr. Trish Lane
- Shirley Raun as Mrs. Reed
- Louis Graham as Dr. Ian Hunter
- Jonathan Nation as Uncle Jim
- Mark Hengst as Matt
- Gilberto Canto as Gino
- Omar Mora as Raul

== Production ==
The film is set on December 21, 2012, and follows the 2012 phenomenon. The Asylum said the film was part of their new series of faith-based end of the world films.

== Release ==
The film released on February 12, 2008.

== Reception ==
Collider called it a "thermonuclear dumpster fire," claiming it makes Roland Emmerich's film look like Citizen Kane. Richard Drake at Arkansas Times wrote a negative review saying they will "find someone who really needs their weekend ruined, and pass this movie along to them."

Film critic Christopher Armstead said it has "glorious and unexpected humor" but that pacing may leave those without patience unable to continue. OutNow scored it 1 out of 6, criticizing the effects and claiming "it is a mess, even for fans of trash cinema."

The film ranks #1 on Collider's 10 Worst Disaster Movies of All Time.

== Sequel ==
Although the film was released before the Emmerich title in 2009, The Asylum announced that a sequel called 2012: Part 2 would be coming, since Dolenz's character survived.
