= Mega Shark =

Mega Shark or megashark may refer to:

== Sharks ==
- Megalodon, a very large extinct shark
- Whale shark, the largest living species of shark
- Great white shark, one of the largest living species of predatory shark
- Megamouth shark, a shark with a very large mouth

== The Asylum's Mega Shark film series ==
- Mega Shark (film series), a series of films by the American independent film company The Asylum
  - Mega Shark Versus Giant Octopus, 2009 American-British monster/disaster film
  - Mega Shark Versus Crocosaurus, 2010 monster disaster film
  - Mega Shark Versus Mecha Shark, 2014 direct-to-video monster/disaster film
  - Mega Shark Versus Kolossus, 2015 monster science fiction film

== Other uses ==
- Malibu Shark Attack (aka Mega Shark of Malibu), 2009 TV film, directed by David Lister and produced for the Syfy channel

== See also ==
- Shark (disambiguation)
- Mega (disambiguation)
