= Syfy (Russia) =

Russian fantastics and horror cable television network

Syfy Russia Сай Фай Россия
- Broadcast area: Russia, Kazakhstan

Ownership
- Owner: NBCUniversal

History
- Launched: May 30, 2008
- Closed: February 11, 2011 (Kazakhstan); February 28, 2013

Links
- Website: www.syfy.ru

Syfy (formerly known as the Sci Fi Channel) was a Russian pay television channel service specialising in science fiction, fantasy and horror shows and movies. The channel launched on May 30, 2008. It was available on cable and satellite television.

Syfy replaced Sci-fi Channel on April 13, 2010.

The channel closed on February 28, 2013.

== Programmes ==
- Battlestar Galactica
- Being Human UK
- Being Human USA
- Caprica
- Charmed
- Dark Angel
- Destination Truth
- Eleventh Hour
- Doctor Who
- Face/Off
- Ghost Hunters
- Hercules: The Legendary Journeys
- Jack Hunter and the Lost Treasure of Ugarit
- Lava Storm
- Lois & Clark: The New Adventures of Superman
- Primeval
- Quantum Leap
- Robot Chicken
- Roswell
- Sliders
- Stargate Atlantis
- Stargate Universe
- Star Trek
- The Day of the Triffids
- The Dead Will Tell
- The Pretender
- Torchwood
- Warehouse 13

=== Movies ===
- 2010: Moby Dick
- Airline Disaster
- Atomic Twister
- Beetlejuice
- Beyond Loch Ness
- Dead Air
- Destination: Infestation
- Iron Invader
- Mega Piranha
- Mega Python vs. Gatoroid
- Mega Shark Versus Crocosaurus
- Mega Shark Versus Giant Octopus
- Metal Tornado
- Night Watch (2004 film)
- Pterodactyl
- Red Planet
- Sinbad and The Minotaur
- Spawn
- The 7 Adventures of Sinbad
- The Birds
- The Matrix
- Titanic II
- Twilight Watch
- Universal Soldier: Regeneration
- Xtinction: Predator X
