= 2025 Armageddon =

- DVD cover
- Directed by: Michael Su
- Starring: Michael Paré; Sarah Lieving; Anthony Jensen; Paul Logan; Jhey Castles
- Production company: The Asylum
- Release dates: December 16, 2022 (theaters); December 23, 2022 (digital)
- Country: United States
- Language: English

2025 Armageddon is a 2022 American science-fiction monster film directed by Michael Su and produced by The Asylum. Released in celebration of The Asylum's 25th anniversary, it is a crossover film featuring monsters from various other films by the studio. Is the fifth installment in the Mega Shark film series and the ninth installment in the Sharknado film series.

== Plot ==
In 2006, twin sisters Madolyn and Quinn view Snakes on a Train, which was mistakenly purchased by their grandmother, who believed it was Snakes on a Plane. The sisters bond over the film and develop a love of The Asylum's movies.

Over the next two decades, Madolyn becomes a commander in the United States Navy while Quinn joins NASA, and the sisters become estranged. Madolyn's ship is sunk by a giant piranha, leaving her the only survivor; she later comes upon a city being attacked by a pair of giant robots and manages to take control of one. Quinn, meanwhile, discovers the destruction of the International Space Station by a rogue asteroid and informs their father Thomas, a Cabinet official. As they investigate these incidents, strange drones are seen in multiple cities scanning areas with lasers; Washington D.C. is then attacked by a giant crocodile. By the time the crocodile disappears, much of the government has been killed in the chaos, and the city being completely destroyed, resulting in Thomas being sworn in as president.

An attack on a subway train in Tokyo by a giant snake leads Madolyn and Quinn to realize that the creatures are imitating those featured in movies by The Asylum, a theory borne out by the appearance from a Mega Shark to the battle near the Eastern Seaboard. Meanwhile, FCC investigation uncovers suspicious activity around multiple Asylum films on video streaming services, in which the films have been streamed for abnormally long amounts of time.

It is discovered that the creatures are being sent by a hostile alien race who have misinterpreted Asylum films as depicting real-life mythology and are using facsimiles of the creatures as weapons for an invasion of Earth. The drones 3D-print the creatures for deployment; an investigation begins into what The Asylum is, during which they discover the existence of a new External Dimension. However, none of this occurs within a true reality: for them, the universe can be transmitted like a film to a Dimension beyond The Asylum’s movie channel; however, because the aliens' home planet is only receiving an extremely weak signal to stream the movies, their facsimiles are low-resolution and fall apart shortly after creation. Deducing that the creatures can be fought using tactics similarly copied from the original films, Thomas has the military lure the Mega Shark into battle with a five and six-headed shark, both of which are defeated. The aliens realize that humanity has discovered their strategy and begin the next phase of their invasion, sending a ship to land on Earth.

Quinn and a military unit trace the location of a damaged drone. The unit falls into a trap where some of the soldiers are brainwashed by the aliens using lights launched from their hands. Quinn evades capture and secretly boards the ship. The alien mothership's location in the ocean is determined, and multiple submarines refitted as Mecha Sharks are deployed to attack it. The submarines defeat a Mega Shark together. Madolyn reconstructs the Armada Suit she acquired earlier and joins the battle piloting it; the aliens respond by sending a hybrid of many creatures fused together. She defeats the hybrid, prompting the aliens to summon a sharknado 6. The Mecha Sharks and the Mega Shark are absorbed into the Vortex (Note: from the Sharknado series) to protect the ship. Meanwhile, the brainwashed soldiers return to the bunker where Thomas is sheltering, intent on converting the President to advance the invasion. A soldier who avoided conversion alerts Thomas to the fact that those who fall victim to the brainwashing are transformed into members of the alien species and can brainwash new victims. Thomas attempts to escape while protecting the others sheltering inside the bunker, but is captured and converted.

Despite destroying the sharknado in the process, Madolyn's Armada Suit is damaged beyond repair. Quinn is discovered by the aliens and nearly converted, but she uses their weakness to soundwaves to slip away on a landing ship. During her escape, she sabotages the control system for the drones. As the mothership attempts to leave Earth through a wormhole, where all creatures are absorbed, many creatures are generated at random, and a giant octopus attacks the mothership. Quinn's lander happens to crash near Madolyn's location and they reunite, but they are confronted by the brainwashed former humans led by Thomas. However, Thomas retains some of his humanity, and leads those following him away instead of having his daughters transformed. Madolyn and Quinn, overcoming their estrangement, realize that their battle has only just begun.

== Cast ==
- Michael Paré as Thomas Ramsey
- Jhey Castles as Lieutenant Commander Madoyln Webb
- Lindsey Marie Wilson as Dr. Quinn Ramsey
- Joseph Michael Harris as Corporal McKee
- David Thomas Newman as Private First Class Sharp
- Gerald Webb as Jerry Ford
- Anthony Jensen as Adam Forster
- Sarah Lieving as Gretchen Willis
- Phillip Andre Botello as Aaron Farmer
- Jolene Andersen as Lucy Taggart
- Paul Logan as Officer Greg Stern
- Mike Gaglio as Actor
- G. Anthony Joseph as Voy
- Michelle NG as Aza
- Natalie Daniels as Ryr
- Presley Alexander as Young Maddie
- Gianna Yeager as Young Quinn
- Joshua Duhon as Young Thomas
- Willow Hale as Grandma
- Nancy Harding as Judge
- Todd Karner as Engenieer
- Lauren Elyse Buckley as Tech
- Joe Finfera as Quartermaster
- Michael Su as Pilot
- Sam Schweikert as Jej
- Erica Duke as Uxu
- Madeleine Falk, Jessica Debonville, and Michael Deni as Crew Members
- Lex Sosa, Andrew Stussie, Vassili Karathanasis, Alvin Knight, Jovanka Azyadet, and Nia Vargas as Zombies

== Reception ==
The magazine Paste described the premise as "delightfully meta", praising The Asylum's audacity for creating "a world where their own films are widely beloved blockbusters". The film has been described as "the Avengers: Endgame of Asylum movies". Despite this, the film itself has been criticized. The website Voices From the Balcony gave the film 1.5 stars, saying that the special effects left something to be desired, and describing the CGI of one scene in particular as "actually embarrassing". They also criticized the shortness of the scenes featuring monsters and lack of major monster battles, as well as the dialogue and "weak drama". The website Film Blitz said that the film was "a chore to sit through", saying that while the premise had potential, the execution was poor.
