= Karol Wojtyła (senior) =

Polish Army officer, father of Pope John Paul II (1879–1941)

Servant of God Karol Wojtyła
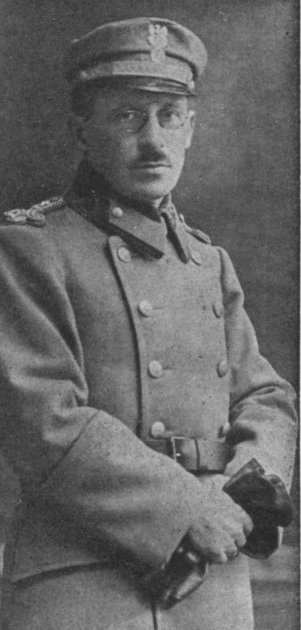
- Born: 18 July 1879; Lipnik, Galicia and Lodomeria, Austria-Hungary
- Died: 18 February 1941 (aged 61); Kraków, General Government
- Spouse: Emilia Wojtyła
- Children: 3 including Pope John Paul II, Dr Edmund Wojtyła
- Military career
- Allegiance: Austria-Hungary; Second Polish Republic
- Branch: Austro-Hungarian Army; Polish Army
- Rank: Porucznik
- Nickname: Karol
- Units: 56th Infantry Regiment; 12th Infantry Regiment
- Conflicts: World War I: Gorlice–Tarnów Offensive
- Awards: Military Merit Cross

Karol Wojtyła (18 July 1879 – 18 February 1941) was a Polish military officer who was a non-commissioned officer of the Austro-Hungarian Army and a lieutenant of the Polish Armed Forces' administration. He was the father and namesake of Karol Józef Wojtyła, who became Pope John Paul II in 1978, and the father of Polish doctor Edmund Wojtyła. He died from what is believed to be a heart attack in 1941 while his son was away, an event considered to have influenced his son's decision to join the seminary.

== Biography ==
Karol Wojtyła was born on 18 July 1879, in Lipnik, the son of Polish tailor Maciej Wojtyła (1 February 1852 in Czaniec – 23 September 1923 in Wadowice) and his first wife Anna Marianna Przeczek (1853–1881, born and died in Lipnik). His mother died when he was 2 years old.

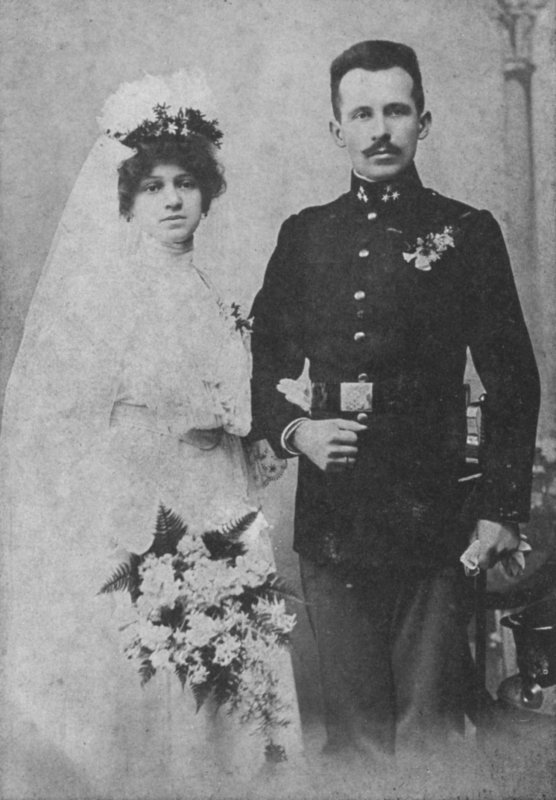
Emilia and Karol Wojtyła's wedding portrait

He married Emilia Kaczorowska on 10 February 1906. The wedding took place in Kraków, in Saints Peter and Paul Church, Kraków. They had three children: Edmund Wojtyła (1906–1932), Olga Maria (died soon after birth on 7 July 1916), Karol Józef (1920–2005).

He was a tailor by trade. In 1900, he was called up for the Austro-Hungarian Army. He spent a total of 27 years in the army. He was a non-commissioned officer. During World War I, he was transferred to Hranice in Moravia, and he fought in the Gorlice–Tarnów Offensive in May 1915. In August 1915, he was appointed as an officer of the military registrar. On 1 September 1915, he was a noncommissioned officer of the 56th Infantry Regiment. He worked in the Wadowice County Supplementary Command until 1918. Before 1917, he was awarded the Military Cross of Merit with a crown.

After Poland regained its independence, he was admitted to the Polish Army and was an officer of the 12th Infantry Regiment from Wadowice. He was promoted to the rank of lieutenant in the corps of professional administrative officers of the office department. In 1924, he served in the Wadowice County Supplementary Command. He had retired by 1928. In 1934, as a retired lieutenant, he remained in the records of the Poviat Supplementary Command Wadowice.

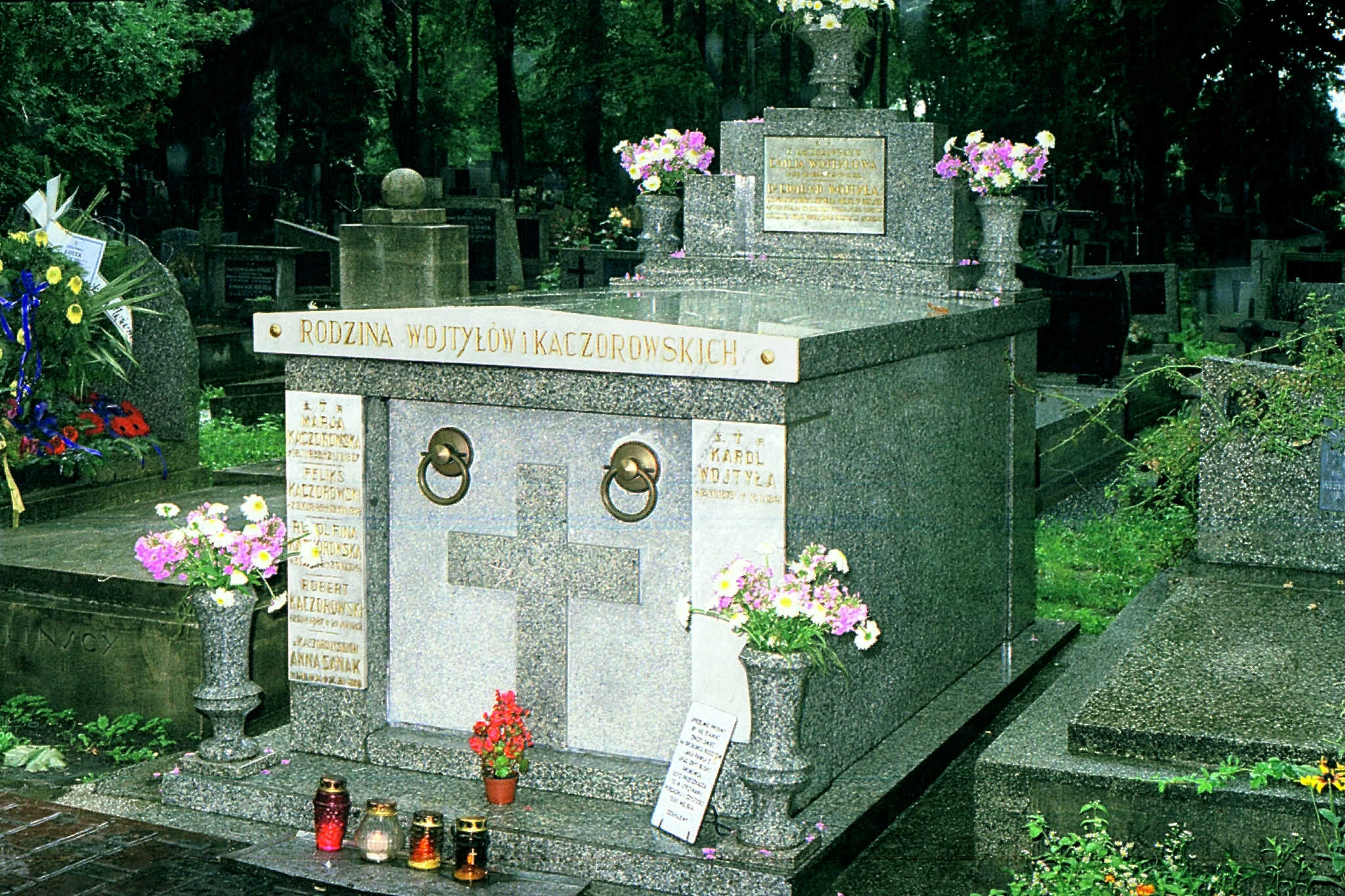
The tomb of Karol Wojtyła, his wife Emilia and his son Edmund

In 1929, as a result of myocarditis and kidney failure, his wife died, and three years later, his eldest son, Edmund, died of scarlet fever. In 1938, he moved from Wadowice, together with his adolescent son Karol, to Kraków. He died there on 18 February 1941. He was buried in the military cemetery on Prandoty Street in Kraków.

== Commemoration ==
The role of Karol Wojtyła Senior was played by Olgierd Łukaszewicz in the film Karol: A Man Who Became Pope and Robert Mazurkiewicz in the miniseries Pope John Paul II. Alfred Burke played him in the film Pope John Paul II.

In 2018, one of the streets in Lublin was named for him and for his wife. The Wojtyłas are also patrons of a street in Wadowice.

On 11 March 2020, Marek Jędraszewski, Archbishop of Kraków, announced the beginning of the process of beatification of Karol and Emilia Wojtyła; The process of beatification of John Paul II's parents began officially on 7 May 2020 in Wadowice.

== Bibliography ==
- Rocznik Oficerski 1924. Warszawa: Ministerstwo Spraw Wojskowych. 1924.
- Rocznik Oficerski 1928. Warszawa: Ministerstwo Spraw Wojskowych. 1928.
- Rocznik Oficerski Rezerw 1934. Warszawa: Ministerstwo Spraw Wojskowych. 1934.
- Genealogia Polska – przodkowie Karola Wojtyły
- "Dokumenty wojskowe Karola Wojtyły"
- "Dane metrykalne Karola Wojtyły"
- "Dane metrykalne Emilia Kaczorowska"
- "Dane metrykalne Olga Wojtyła"
- "Dane metrykalne Edmund Wojtyła"
