= Mega Python vs. Gatoroid =

2011 monster science-fiction disaster film by Mary Lambert

- DVD cover
- Written by: Naomi Selfman
- Directed by: Mary Lambert
- Starring: Debbie Gibson; Tiffany; A Martinez; Kathryn Joosten; Micky Dolenz
- Theme music composer: Chris Ridenhour
- Country of origin: United States
- Original language: English

Production
- Producer: David Michael Latt
- Cinematography: Troy Smith
- Editor: Shawn David Thompson
- Running time: 90 minutes
- Budget: $ 500,000

Original release
- Network: Syfy
- Release: January 15, 2011

Mega Python vs. Gatoroid is a 2011 monster, science-fiction, disaster film by The Asylum, directed by Mary Lambert, and starring pop singers Debbie Gibson and Tiffany. The film premiered theatrically in Texas and premiered on television on January 29, 2011, on Syfy in the United States before being released on home video on June 21, 2011.

== Plot ==
A group of animal activists, consisting of Dr. Nikki Riley, Gia, and Ben, breaks into a house and steals dozens of exotic pythons before setting them free into the Florida Everglades. Their actions inadvertently cause the snakes to grow into alarming sizes and threaten the ecosystem, as they kill over 72 alligators in a matter of days. Due to the threat of the invasive species, Park Ranger Terry O’Hara issues permits to the local hunters to exterminate the pythons – much to Nikki's dismay. However, the hunters themselves – including Terry's fiancé Justin – are quickly eliminated by the giant snakes. Vowing to avenge her fiancé's death, Terry and Angie take boxes of anabolic steroids from Angie's grandson Manny and inject them into dead chickens before feeding them to alligators. Among the steroids is an experimental serum that neutralizes muscle growth inhibitors with a side effect of increased aggression. Meanwhile, Nikki and her group set up cameras all over the Everglades to monitor Terry's activities. They catch and record Terry and Angie feeding the steroid-laced chickens to the alligators.

Several months later, Terry meets Dr. Diego Ortiz, who warns her that an all-out war between the giant pythons and the mutated alligators in the Everglades has begun. After seeing a python and an alligator battle each other, Diego urges Terry to cancel a fund-raising event that is to be held that night to help restore a nearby estuary, but his cries fall on deaf ears. As Nikki and her group walk around the forest to plant pheromones, they discover the skeleton of a dead giant python before they are attacked by a giant alligator, which eats Gia. In another part of the Everglades, Diego discovers that the alligators have laid hundreds of eggs – all of which are 20-30 times their normal size. He calls Terry and asks her to give him access to explosives to get rid of the eggs, but his request is denied. Flying a helicopter over a swamp, Diego rescues Nikki, but Ben is devoured by an alligator. He offers to fly her to the nearest hospital, but she tells him to bring her to her office immediately. After dropping her off, he returns to the site of the alligator eggs and destroys them with a pack of dynamite. He then finds a cave filled with thousands more eggs and calls Terry, telling her that if she does not evacuate the party nearby, he will call the governor and have him send the National Guard to the quarry.

At the fund-raising event, Nikki shows up at the VIP tent uninvited, threatening to blackmail Terry with a disc containing footage of her feeding the alligators. This leads to a fight between the two women that destroys the party. Meanwhile, as Nikki and Terry continue their fight in a swamp, the reptiles crash the event, devouring the guest of honor Micky Dolenz and several other partygoers. However, Terry's friend Barbara Fine manages to survive and escape. Realizing that they will have to work together to stop this threat, Nikki and Terry, along with Angie and Diego, drive to Miami to get help and prevent the reptiles from invading the city, but are too late and Angie is devoured by a python as they flee from the city. Nikki comes up with a plan to save Florida; she plants explosives in the quarry while Terry and Diego fly over Miami in a crop duster and spray pheromones they acquired from Nikki's office, luring the reptiles to them. However, when their plane crashes on a highway after being hit by a python, Terry takes the remaining bottles of pheromones and drives an abandoned car to lure the reptiles away from the Turkey Point Nuclear Power Plant. Back in the cave, Nikki finds herself surrounded by an alligator and hundreds of hatchlings. Terry rescues her by driving her car with a lit container of gasoline toward the alligator. Surrounded by the remaining reptiles around the quarry, the two women lock themselves inside a supply shed, where Nikki admits to Terry that she released the snakes into the Everglades, to Terry's disgust. Diego arrives in a rescue helicopter and picks up Nikki, but is too late to save Terry, who is caught by an alligator and devoured, with Nikki and Diego helpless to save her. Nikki blows up the quarry, killing all of the reptiles in sight, but the explosion rocks the helicopter, throwing her off as she falls into a swamp. The helicopter circles back for Nikki while pieces of pythons and alligators rain around her, and she is bisected by a python head that is still alive (as snakeheads can survive for up to an hour).

One year after the incident, Diego cuts a ribbon to inaugurate the O’Hara-Riley Estuary, named in memory of Terry and Nikki.

== Cast ==
- Debbie Gibson as Dr. Nikki Riley
- Tiffany as Park Ranger Terry O'Hara
- A Martinez as Dr. Diego Ortiz
- Kathryn Joosten as Angie
- Kevin M. Horton as R.J. Cupelli
- Micky Dolenz as himself
- Carey Van Dyke as Justin
- Arden Cho as Gia
- Patrick Hancock as Ben
- Kristen Wilson as Barbara Fine
- Vanessa Claire Smith as Mary "Contrary Mary"
- Chris Neville as Manny
- Jay Beyers as Martin "Matredee Martin"
- Harmony Blossom as Girl At The Party
- Kaiwi Lyman as Tom
- Kylan James as Jordan
- Timmy McFunn as Morgan
- Jeff DuJardin as Jack
- Jack N. Harding as Hank
- Robert R. Shafer as Zeke
- Travis Seaborn as Jackson

== Production ==
The film was shot at Griffith Park and the Los Angeles County Arboretum and Botanic Garden in Los Angeles, California, which acted as a stand-in setting for Florida. Some of the film's footage was recycled from Mega Shark Versus Crocosaurus.

== Soundtrack ==
The film's soundtrack features the song "Snake Charmer" by Debbie Gibson and "Serpentine" by Tiffany.

== Reception ==
Mega Python vs. Gatoroid has been panned by critics. Ken Tucker of Entertainment Weekly said in his review that the film "did something that other stalwarts of this genre, such as Sharktopus and Dinocroc vs. Supergator, did not do: It called attention to how bad, campy, and trashy it was; the actors did everything except wink coyly at the camera." Jared Rasic of CHUD.com gave the film two out of five stars, commenting, "this movie knows exactly what it is and doesn’t try to surprise you with any sort of quality element to make the time you spent watching this have meaning."

== See also ==
- Mega Shark Versus Giant Octopus – a 2009 monster disaster film by The Asylum starring Debbie Gibson
  - Mega Shark Versus Mecha Shark – a 2014 sequel, featuring Gibson in a reduced role
- Mega Piranha – a 2010 monster disaster film by The Asylum starring Tiffany
- List of killer crocodile films
- List of killer snake films
