= Flame of the West =

Flame of the West may refer to:

- Flame of the West (1945 film), directed by Lambert Hillyer and starring Johnny Mack Brown
- Flame of the West (2008 film), a short film directed by Hannah Cowley
- The Flame of the West (1918 film), a short film directed by William V. Mong
- "Flame of the West", a song on the 1984 album Steeltown by Scottish rock band Big Country
- Andúril, a fictitious sword in The Lord of the Rings, reforged as Quenya: "Flame of the West"
