= Torture Room =

- DVD released by Echo Bridge Home Entertainment
- Directed by: Eric Forsberg
- Written by: Eric Forsberg
- Produced by: Karen Forsberg
- Starring: Lena Bookall; John Forgeham; Barry Ratcliffe; William Tempel
- Cinematography: Nick Rossier
- Edited by: Mary Ann Skweres
- Music by: Robert Bayless
- Production companies: Cerebral Experiment; Lacy Street Productions
- Distributed by: Echo Bridge Home Entertainment
- Release date: 5 January 2010 (United States)
- Running time: 83 minutes
- Country: United States
- Languages: Arabic; English; German
- Box office: $20,000

Torture Room (also known as Pledge of Allegiance) is a 2010 American political horror thriller film written and directed by Eric Forsberg. A direct-to-video release, it stars Lena Bookall as Anoush Karagozian, a woman whose suspected ties to Middle Eastern terrorists lead to her being taken captive by U.S. government agents, who subject her to torture in an attempt to brainwash her into becoming an American asset in the war on terror.

== Plot ==
A battered Arab man named Jahan Sufi is tortured by having spikes hammered into his arms, and when asked for names, he blurts out "Anoush Karagozian." Anoush is a woman of French and Armenian descent who works as a cocktail waitress in Los Angeles. Government operatives abduct Anoush and interrogate her about the "ragheads" in her life, like her boss, Reza Bayoul, her ex-fiancé, Jahan Sufi (who she was going to convert for before marrying) and her current boyfriend, Shazad Mohamaed Sousa. After being made to sign a contract which stipulates that she agrees to serve the interests of the United States government, Anoush is sedated and brought to a black site that is overseen by a man known only as Mr. Green.

Anoush, along with the site's other detainees, is subjected to a battery of tortures, including incessant noise, being forced to consume raw meat (including a pig's head) and toilet water, psychic driving, a mock execution, electric shocks, being repeatedly forced to watch abstract and graphically violent footage of things like war crimes and Nazi human experimentation while drugged with hallucinogens, having one of her nipples sliced off, a staged rescue, and being sealed in a box and left to wallow in her own excrement for days while hooked up to an IV. At one point, Mr. Green attempts to force Anoush to kill Jahan, and when she refuses, he tries again later, this time with a serial rapist, killer, and implied cannibal named Ron. Ron and Anoush are locked in a cell together and starved, and when Ron passes out after beating Anoush in frustration, Anoush uses strips of her own clothes to hogtie and strangle him, to the approval of Mr. Green.

Mr. Green brings Anoush into his office and has her eat dog food while he uses fake documents to gaslight her into believing that she is really a U.S. intelligence agent named "Sharon" who enemy combatants have brainwashed into thinking that she is Anoush Karagozian. As a final test to see if Anoush will be useful as a tool in the war on terror, Mr. Green coerces her into shooting her own mother, and when Anoush attempts suicide afterward though survives, Mr. Green congratulates her, stating, "You did it, Sharon. You killed the thing you love. And you were willing to die for us too." A pair of agents release Anoush and arrange for her to be hit by a car as a cover for all of her injuries before leaving her with a special cellphone that she is to use to keep in touch with Mr. Green. The film ends with Anoush huddled in the fetal position, mindlessly repeating random words over and over again after calling Mr. Green to inform him that Shazad has made plans to meet with friends who are visiting from Lebanon.

== Cast ==
- Ahmed Lucan as Jahan Sufi
- John Forgeham as Mr. Green
- Kenneth Robbins as Bunton
- Michael Woolston as Carlton
- Dano Rice as Schmidt
- Lena Bookall as Anoush Karagozian
- Wali Razaki as Shazad Mohamaed Sousa
- Chad Nell as Clint
- Barry Ratcliffe as Mark
- Kaled Shakta as Reza Bayoul
- Adrian Lee as Mrs. Karagozian
- Louis Graham as The Director
- Deirdre V. Lyons as Medical Attendant/Brainwashing Voice
- Kristin Pfeifer as Torturer
- Lola Forsberg as Girl in Cage
- William Tempel as Ron X

== Production ==
Eric Forsberg financed Torture Room with the profits made from his previous film, Night of the Dead. Forsberg originally intended for Torture Room to be a found footage film, but was talked into shooting it in a more traditional narrative style by producers, a change which he has lamented, stating, "The script for this film is much deeper and more politically charged than the final product which is more like Saw; a torture film." According to Forsberg, the film is intended as "a powerful statement against our country's recent abuse of human rights" which he attempted to present in a "rich and uncomfortable way, bridging the film between political thriller and reality terror, as if Michael Moore had made a horror film with Quentin Tarantino and 60 Minutes."

== Release ==
Quantum Releasing distributed the film on DVD in the United States through Echo Bridge Home Entertainment on January 5, 2010. It grossed $20,000. Quantum Releasing had not actually secured the distribution rights to the film, and it and Echo Bridge were both sued for copyright infringement by executive producer Don Randles's company, Randles Films, in 2010, with the case going to trial on May 10, 2011. Randles Films was awarded $350,000 in actual damages and $215,655.30 in attorneys' fees and costs, for a sum total of $565,655.30, on December 2, 2011. On December 4, 2013, Echo Bridge appealed the court's verdict on Randles Films, LLC v. Quantum Releasing, LLC, but the ruling was affirmed by the United States Court of Appeals for the Ninth Circuit on January 2, 2014.

Torture Room had a limited theatrical re-release on Halloween in 2014.

== Reception ==
Adrian Halen of Horror News called Torture Room a "damn fine" and "brilliantly perverse" film that was a "powerful portrayal of the kind of things they dare don't speak of but at the same time find necessary to protect our country." Steven Tee of Cinesploitation had a middling response to Torture Room, feeling that its message was "powerful" and Lena Bookall's performance engrossing, even though the film as a whole was "a bit corny" and "copiously bland and unoriginal." While The Worldwide Celluloid Massacre praised Bookall's performance, they otherwise lambasted the film, opining that it had "no back-story, no plot" before concluding, "Regardless of whether you believe American torturers go to this extreme, there's also the ridiculous brainwashing which, though very methodological, nobody would believe is actually practical and efficient since the time of Cold War paranoia. The mere fact that they turn her into a babbling insane woman would make her useless as a spy. So this is basically just a pure torture-porn movie with a faux-political angle."
