= Eric Forsberg =

American dramatist

- Born: December 16, 1959 (age 66); Chicago, Illinois, United States
- Occupations: Producer, film director, writer
- Parent(s): Josephine Forsberg; Rolf Forsberg

Eric Forsberg (born December 16, 1959) is an American writer. He wrote and directed the feature film Mega Piranha, as well as the writer of the feature film Snakes on a Train, one of the first mockbusters produced and released by The Asylum. He also wrote the screenplays for 30,000 Leagues Under the Sea and War of the Worlds 2: The Next Wave, also for The Asylum. He directed the film Alien Abduction which aired on Sci Fi Channel, as well as Night of the Dead which aired on Chiller TV. Other writer and director credits include the political thriller Torture Room, and the stoner comedy Sex Pot as well as Monster, Almighty Thor, Arachnoquake, and Age of the Hobbits. He also worked as a Co-Producer and assistant director on numerous films for Christopher Coppola and Alain Silver, including White Nights, Bel Air, and Palmer's Pickup. In his early years Forsberg was an improvisational comedy instructor at The Players Workshop and The Second City Training Center in Chicago.

== Biography ==
Forsberg was born in Chicago on December 16, 1959. He is the son of improv director Josephine Forsberg and filmmaker Rolf Forsberg.

Before moving to Hollywood in 1997, Forsberg worked as a writer and director in the Chicago theater scene. The original musical, Knat Scatt Private Eye, with Steve Carell, was among his more successful productions. Forsberg also taught improvisation at The Players Workshop and The Second City Training Center where his students included Stephen Colbert, Amy Sedaris, Tim Meadows, and Rachel Dratch. Forsberg also worked to create a school/family concert for the Chicago Symphony Orchestra. His performance credits include Silas Brimfire at the Bristol Renaissance Faire.

Soon after Forsberg arrived in Los Angeles, he began working with director Christopher Coppola and producer Alain Silver. Following that he started writing screenplays and directing feature films for David Michael Latt and David Rimawi at The Asylum.

In 1998, Forsberg married his wife Karen. They welcomed a daughter in 1999, the later actress Lola Forsberg. Forsberg's wife Karen died in 2025.

== Filmography ==
=== Writer and director ===
- Mega Piranha – (2010), Syfy, The Asylum
- Sex Pot – (2009), The Asylum
- Monster – (2007), The Asylum
- Torture Room – (2007), Cerebral Experiment
- Night of the Dead – (2006), Cerebral Experiment
- Alien Abduction (film) – (2005), The Asylum
- Andy – (1985), Players Workshop

=== Writer ===
- Troy: The Odyssey (2017), The Asylum
- Age of the Hobbits (2012), The Asylum
- Arachnoquake (2012 – story), Active Entertainment/SyFy
- Almighty Thor (uncredited) – (2011), The Asylum/SyFy
- MILF (story credit)- (2010), The Asylum
- War of the Worlds 2 – (2008), The Asylum
- 30,000 Leagues Under the Sea – (2007), The Asylum
- Snakes on a Train – (2006), The Asylum
- Blackhorse: History of the 11th Cavalry – (2005), US Army
- The Aquanauts (TV)- (1999–2000), Village Roadshow, Animal Planet

== Stage ==
=== Playwright and director ===
- PLAYS & MUSICALS FOR YOUNG AUDIENCES
- Jimmy Sweeter Visits Candyland – Children's Theater of The Second City – (1980)
- The Wondrous Tales of Baby Clown Foo – Children's Theater of The Second City – (1981)
- Tales of Young King Arthur – Children's Theater of The Second City – (1981)
- Santa and the Christmas Gnomes – Children's Theater of The Second City – (1981)
- Swash Buckler and the Gems of Chaos – Children's Theater of The Second City – (1982)
- The Adventures of Sinbad – Children's Theater of The Second City – (1983)
- Knat Scatt Private Eye (children's version) – Children's Theater of The Second City – (1984)
- Monkey Kings and Other Things – Children's Theater of The Second City – (1986)
- Mississippi Mark and his Crazy Caliope Company – Children's Theater of The Second City – (1987)
- The Fast Paced Comedy of the King some Clowns and a Couple of Bad Guys – Children's Theater of The Second City – (1988)
- Dr. Stagemaster's Amazing Imagination Machine – Candlelight Dinner Theater – (1989)
- Fantastic Fantasy Factory – Candlelight Dinner Theater – (1990)
- MenuMania – Candlelight Dinner Theater – (1992–93)

=== Plays and musicals ===
- And So They Fell – Performer's Arena – (1981)
- A Dozen Idiots (co-writer) – Performer's Arena – (1981)
- Knat Scatt Private Eye – Theatre Building Chicago/Players Workshop/Avalon Theater Company – (1986)
- A Tribute to Vincent van Gogh by the Impressionists' Circle – Performer's Arena – (1988)
- Time Machine – Theatre Building Chicago/New Tuners – (1994)
- Cannibal – Theatre Building Chicago/Writer's Bloc New Play Festival – (1995)

=== Director ===
- The Bacchae (by Euripides – Performer's Arena – (1981)
- The Homecoming of Beorhtnoth Beorhthelm's Son (by JRR Tolkien) – Performer's Arena – (1981)
- Rhinocéros (by Eugène Ionesco) – Performer's Arena – (1982)
- A Thousand Clowns – Performer's Arena – 1983
- The Man in the Glass Booth (by Robert Shaw – Performer's Arena – (1984)
- Marat Sade (by Peter Weiss) – Performer's Arena – (1984)
- What the Butler Saw (by Joe Orton) – Performer's Arena – (1985)
