= Mega Piranha =

2010 American horror film

- DVD cover art
- Written by: Eric Forsberg (Uncredited)
- Directed by: Eric Forsberg; Stuart Gillard
- Starring: Tiffany; Paul Logan; Barry Williams; David Labiosa; Jesse Daly; Jude Gerard Prest
- Theme music composer: Chris Ridenhour
- Country of origin: United States
- Original language: English

Production
- Producers: David Michael Latt; David Rimawi
- Cinematography: Brian Olinger; Donald McAlpine
- Editor: Bill Parker
- Running time: 93 minutes
- Production company: The Asylum

Original release
- Network: Syfy
- Release: April 10, 2010

Mega Piranha (also known as Megapiranha) is a 2010 science fiction action film produced by The Asylum. It was directed by Eric Forsberg and Stuart Gillard and stars Tiffany, Paul Logan and Barry Williams. In the tradition of The Asylum's catalog, this film is a mockbuster of Piranha 3D. It was filmed in Belize, Central America.

== Plot ==
The film focuses on the Orinoco River in Venezuela, where a strain of genetically modified piranha have escaped into an isolated tributary of the river. Through human interference of the local environment, the megapiranha manage to escape from their isolated spot and swim downstream, killing all that cross their path. The megapiranha gradually make their way towards Florida at the height of the tourist season.

After the outbreak, a team including Special Agent Fitch and Sarah Monroe, work to contain the megapiranhas within Venezuela. They begin to get into trouble with the authorities when they attempt to cross over the Venezuelan border. Not having proper clearance and documentation, Special Agent Fitch resorts to using the diplomacy of his fist and drives off. He is pursued by Colonel Antonio Diaz in a high-speed chase through the jungle. Throughout the chase, Fitch alternates driving a Toyota Camry and Hyundai Elantra while Diaz is seen at different points in a GMC Jimmy, Chevrolet Suburban, Suzuki XL-7, and Ford Explorer. Fitch escapes by stealing a helicopter and heads to the International Super Bunker (ISB). During the journey, the helicopter runs out of fuel and Sarah Monroe rigs the emergency oxygen tank to the fuel line to make it to the ISB safely.

The megapiranhas continue to move north, consuming two battleships and a nuclear submarine. They eventually reach south Florida, where they kill at least five Puerto Ricans on a beach and manage to blow up two hotels. Meanwhile, the only force that can stop them is located at the ISB. After the megapiranhas prove impervious to both torpedoes and depth charges—and even a nuclear torpedo fails to stop them—Special Agent Fitch and Professor Sarah Monroe conclude that the only way to stop the megapiranhas is to face them in their own terrain: underwater. An army of SCUBA divers armed with guns would make the huge fish bleed, causing them to enter a feeding frenzy and kill each other. If this were to fail, then a massive nuclear strike would be used to destroy the megapiranha, as well as most of Florida.

In the middle of the operation, Colonel Diaz arrives in a helicopter, presumably using multiple fuel tanks to do this journey. The Colonel aims to get revenge on Agent Fitch and throws a rope into the water to trick him into climbing up into the enemy helicopter. Fitch, upon his arrival, shoots the pilot in the mouth with a flare gun, which causes the pilot's head to explode. Fitch then uses a homing beacon (which is actually a canister of CO_{2}) to attract a megapiranha, jumping out of the helicopter shortly before it is consumed by the fishy behemoth.

Fitch is pursued by the megapiranha that ate the helicopter, eventually hiding in a reef where the megapiranha is unable to follow. When the piranha opens its mouth, Fitch shoots his gun at the helicopter still in the beast's jaws. The helicopter explodes, killing the fish. The other megapiranha converge on the bloodshed and Fitch is able to escape as the piranha enters a feeding frenzy and begin tearing each other to pieces, seemingly resulting in them wiping themselves out. Sarah and Fitch make out and all is well.

== Cast ==
- Tiffany as Sarah Monroe
- Paul Logan as Jason Fitch
- Barry Williams as Bob Grady
- David Labiosa as Colonel Antonio Diaz
- Jude Gerard Prest as Dr. Higgins
- Jesse Daly as Gordon
- Alessandro Tierno as Sargento Ayudante
- Jay Beyers as Seaman Toby
- Cooper Harris as Lieutenant Julia
- Gregory Paul Smith as Greg, The Submarine Navigator
- Jonathan Nation as Mort
- Eric Forsberg as US Ambassador Arnold Regis
- William Morse as Lieutenant Stritch
- Clint Browning as Captain Jonas
- Lola Forsberg as Stephanie "Steph"
- Robert Don as Rodriguez
- David Dustin Kenyon as Lieutenant Baker
- Sex Henderson as Submarine Crewman
- Jillian Easton as Jane Fisher / Jane, The Reporter
- Matt Lagan as Submarine Captain Jim
- Anthony Wemyss as Bernie
- John P. Napoleon as Lieutenant Miller
- Sally Elphick as ISB Tech
- Carl Watts as Captain Decker
- Myles Cranford as Sy
- Ryan Sherman as Jim, The Tech
- Ashley Carr as Half Dead Person
- Fernando Huc as Jose, The Driver
- Natalie Nastulczykova as Technician

== Production ==
The mockbuster was produced to capitalise on the 2010 film Piranha 3D. On March 29, 2010, the SyFy Channel released an exclusive sneak peek of a scene from the film in anticipation of its April 10 premiere of the film. On the April 7, 2010 The Asylum released the official trailer online.

Usual Asylum audience may notice the film recycles short clips from other Asylum films, likely due to low production costs and a limited filming schedule. Such clips come from films like Mega Shark vs. Giant Octopus, Journey to Middle Earth, War of the Worlds and Transmorphers: Fall of Man.

== Reception ==
Dread Central wrote about the film: "Now, the question becomes whether Mega Piranha means we should expect a super-sized piranha a la Asylum's Mega Shark Versus Giant Octopus or if they are basing their film around the prehistoric Megapiranha, a toothier, three-foot version of the carnivorous fish that became extinct millions of years ago. Given the big screen 3D remake is about these Megapiranha, I would say odds are high the latter will prove the case.

The film reached a 2.2 million audience for its April 10 premiere, making it the channel's most-watched movie of the year. Of those, 807,000 were adults 18–49.

Mega Piranha holds an 8% rating on Rotten Tomatoes based on thirteen reviews.

== Soundtrack ==
The score was composed by Chris Ridenhour and featured the song "Frozen Skies" by Tiffany.

== Spinoff ==
A Mega Piranha appears in the 2022 film 2025 Armageddon, released to celebrate The Asylum's twenty-fifth anniversary. It is one of the first monsters sent by a hostile alien race who believe The Asylum's films are based on real creatures.

== See also ==
- Mega Shark Versus Giant Octopus – another sea-monster film by The Asylum, starring Deborah Gibson.
  - Mega Shark Versus Crocosaurus – the 2010 sequel.
- Mega Python vs. Gatoroid – A 2011 film by The Asylum starring both Gibson and Tiffany.
