= Mega Shark (film series) =

Film series

- Distributed by: The Asylum
- Country: United States
- Language: English

The Mega Shark film series is made up of four monster and disaster films from The Asylum, an American independent film company and distributor that focuses on producing low-budget films. The movies in the series are:

== Films ==
Film	U.S. release date	Director(s)	Screenwriter(s)	Story by	Producer(s)
Original series
Mega Shark Versus Giant Octopus	May 19, 2009	Jack Perez	Jack Perez	—N/a	David Michael Latt, David Rimawi & Paul Bales
Mega Shark Versus Crocosaurus	December 21, 2010	Christopher Douglas-Olen Ray	Micho Rutare & Naomi Selfman	—N/a	David Michael Latt, David Rimawi & Paul Bales
Mega Shark Versus Mecha Shark	January 28, 2014	Emile Edwin Smith	Jose Prendes & H. Perry Horton	—N/a	David Michael Latt
Mega Shark Versus Kolossus	July 7, 2015	Christopher Douglas-Olen Ray	Edward DeRuiter	—N/a	David Michael Latt & David Rimawi
Crossover
2025 Armageddon	December 16, 2022	Michael Su	Marc Gottlieb, Glenn Campbell & Tammy Klein	—N/a	David Michael Latt

=== Original series ===
==== Mega Shark Versus Giant Octopus (2009) ====
- Mega Shark Versus Giant Octopus (2009), directed by Ace Hannah (a pseudonym for Jack Perez); starring Deborah Gibson and Lorenzo Lamas

==== Mega Shark Versus Crocosaurus (2010) ====
- Mega Shark Versus Crocosaurus (2010), directed by Christopher Douglas-Olen Ray; starring Jaleel White, Gary Stretch, and Robert Picardo

==== Mega Shark Versus Mecha Shark (2014) ====
- Mega Shark Versus Mecha Shark (2014), directed by Emile Edwin Smith; starring Christopher Judge and Elisabeth Röhm

==== Mega Shark Versus Kolossus (2015) ====
- Mega Shark Versus Kolossus (2015), directed by Douglas-Olen Ray; Illeana Douglas, Amy Rider, and Brody Hutzler

The third film was direct to video; the others received limited theatrical releases.

=== Crossover ===
==== 2025 Armageddon (2022) ====
The Mega Shark, Giant Octopus, and Crocosaurus all appear in The Asylum's 2022 film 2025 Armageddon, which celebrates the studio's twenty-fifth anniversary. In this film, they are created and sent to attack Earth by a hostile alien race that believes The Asylum's films are based on real creatures. To battle them, humanity creates several Mecha Sharks. Kolossus also makes a brief cameo through footage from Mega Shark Versus Kolossus.

== See also ==
- List of killer shark films
