= 12th Infantry Regiment (Poland) =

12th Infantry Regiment (Polish language: 12 Pulk Piechoty, 12 pp) was an infantry regiment of the Polish Army. It existed from 1918 until 1939. Garrisoned in Wadowice, the unit belonged to the 6th Infantry Division from Kraków.

The regiment celebrated its holiday on August 1, the anniversary of the 1920 Battle Of Leszniow, against the Red Army. During the 1939 Invasion of Poland, it belonged to Kraków Army, together with the 6th Infantry Division.

== Commandants ==
- Colonel Jan Mischke (1918–1919),
- Captain Franciszek Alter (1919),
- Colonel Eugeniusz Stecz (1919),
- Major Adam Smialowski (1919),
- Colonel Edward Reyman (1919),
- Captain Oswald Frank (1919),
- Colonel Wandalin Doroszkiewicz (1919 – 10 1920),
- Captain Wladyslaw Mielnik (1920),
- Major Franciszek Alter (1920–1921),
- Colonel Oswald Frank (1921–1927),
- Colonel Jozef Cwiertniak (1927–1929),
- Colonel Jozef Jaklicz (1929–1932),
- Colonel Marian Raczynski (1932–1933),
- Colonel Antoni Staich (1933–1935),
- Colonel Aleksander Stawarz (1935–1939),
- Colonel Marian Strazyc (1939).

== Symbols ==
The flag of the regiment, funded by the residents of Wadowice, Andrychow and Kalwaria Zebrzydowska, was handed to the unit by General Stanisław Szeptycki, on August 1, 1924.

The badge was accepted on 1931. It was in the shape of the shield, with a cross in the middle, and the initials 12 PP.

== Sources ==
- Kazimierz Satora: Opowieści wrześniowych sztandarów. Warszawa: Instytut Wydawniczy Pax, 1990
- Zdzisław Jagiełło: Piechota Wojska Polskiego 1918–1939. Warszawa: Bellona, 2007

== See also ==
- 1939 Infantry Regiment (Poland)
