= Clash of the Empires =

2012 fantasy/adventure film by Joseph J. Lawson

- Directed by: Joseph Lawson
- Screenplay by: Eric Forsberg
- Produced by: David Michael Latt; David Rimawi; Paul Bales
- Starring: Christopher Judge; Bai Ling; Sun Korng
- Cinematography: Richard Vialet
- Edited by: Rob Pallatina
- Music by: Chris Ridenhour
- Production company: The Asylum
- Distributed by: The Asylum
- Release date: February 18, 2013
- Running time: 87 minutes
- Country: United States
- Language: English

Clash of the Empires (also known as Lord of the Elves) is an American fantasy/adventure film produced by The Asylum and directed by Joseph Lawson. It stars Christopher Judge, Bai Ling and Sun Korng.

It was originally titled Age of the Hobbits and set for release direct-to-DVD on December 11, 2012. In the tradition of The Asylum's catalog, the film is a mockbuster of the 2012 film The Hobbit: An Unexpected Journey. This led to a lawsuit against The Asylum for trademark infringement. The lawsuit resulted in a temporary restraining order preventing The Asylum from releasing the film on its scheduled release date.

== Plot ==
The film is about a prehistoric struggle between a community of Homo floresiensis (known as "hobbits") and their brutal oppressors, Java Man ("Java Men"). The hobbits ally with early humans against the Javas. According to The Asylum, "In an ancient age, the small, peace-loving hobbits are enslaved by the Java Men, a race of flesh-eating dragon-riders. The young hobbit Goben must join forces with their neighbor giants, the humans, to free his people and vanquish their enemies."

== Cast ==
- Christopher Judge as Amthar
- Bai Ling as Laylan
- Sun Korng as Goben
- Kyle Morris as Goben (voice)
- Jon Kondelik as Gelling (voice)
- Joseph J. Lawson as Koto (voice)
- Kelly P. Lawson as the Java Witch Queen (voice)

== Warner Bros. lawsuit ==
Warner Bros., producers of The Hobbit film series, sent a cease-and-desist letter to The Asylum on August 31, 2012. The Asylum responded by altering some of the promotional material for their film, but they refused to take the word "hobbit" out of the film's title. In November 2012, Warner Bros., New Line Cinema, MGM and The Hobbit producer Saul Zaentz commenced legal action against The Asylum for Age of the Hobbits, claiming that they were "free-riding" on the worldwide promotional campaign for Peter Jackson's forthcoming films. The Asylum claimed its film is legally sound because its hobbits are not based on the J. R. R. Tolkien creations. The Asylum argued that "Age of the Hobbits is about the real-life human subspecies, Homo floresiensis, discovered in 2003 in Indonesia, which have been uniformly referred to as 'hobbits' in the scientific community."

A lawsuit by Warner Bros. resulted in a temporary restraining order preventing The Asylum from releasing the film on its scheduled release date of December 11. The federal judge presiding over the case found that the film violated the "hobbit" trademark and was likely to cause confusion among consumers. As a result, Age of the Hobbits became the first Asylum film to be blocked from release. A hearing was also scheduled for January 28, 2013 to decide whether the restraining order should become a preliminary injunction.
