= Nice Work (TV series) =

Nice Work is a British television adaptation of the Booker prize-shortlisted 1988 novel of the same name by David Lodge. It was broadcast in 1989 on BBC2 and starred Warren Clarke and Haydn Gwynne.

== Characters ==
The series considered of the following cast:

- Robyn Penrose, played by Haydn Gwynne
- Vic Wilcox, played by Warren Clarke
- Marjorie Wilcox, played by Janet Dale
- Brian Everthorpe, played by John Forgeham
- Stuart Baxter, played by David Calder
- Philip Swallow, played by Christopher Godwin
- Rupert Sutcliffe, played by Terry Coates

== Production ==
The screenplay was directed by Christopher Menaul.

The first TV episode was broadcast on BBC2 on 4 October 1989; subsequent episodes were broadcast on 11, 18 and 25 October.

A DVD edition on two Region 2 discs was released by Simply Media on 24 November 2014.

== Reception ==
The programme won the 1989 Royal Television Society award for best drama series.
