= Lola Forsberg =

American actress

- Born: February 1, 1999 (age 27); Santa Monica, California
- Occupation: Actress

Lola Forsberg (born February 1, 1999) is an American film actress.

== Biography ==
Lola Forsberg was born in Santa Monica, California, on February 1, 1999. Her mother was stage director and film producer Karen Goodman Forsberg and her father is filmmaker Eric Forsberg. Lola Forsberg's first feature film was as the baby in Christopher Coppola's Bel Air, shot in 2000. Her first speaking role was as a precocious child on the pier in Alain Silver's White Nights shot in 2004.

Since then Lola Forsberg has had major roles in Alien Abduction (2005), Snakes on a Train (2006), Night of the Dead (2006), Torture Room (2007), and Sex Pot (2009), as well as the music video Feel the Disease by Kissing Violet. Ms. Forsberg is a regular player in the films of The Asylum and Cerebral Experiment productions. She has also been in numerous television commercials including one for the Ameriquest series that aired during The Super Bowl in 2006.

In 2010 Lola Forsberg had a small role in the SyFy Original Movie Mega Piranha. In 2011 Lola was selected by Tijuana Entertainment as the subject for a children's weight loss and fitness reality show for Lifetime.
