= Pope John Paul II (film) =

- Genre: Biography; Drama
- Written by: Christopher Knopf
- Directed by: Herbert Wise
- Starring: Albert Finney; Caroline Bliss; Brian Cox; John Forgeham
- Music by: Wilfred Josephs
- Country of origin: United States
- Original language: English

Production
- Executive producers: Judith de Paul; Alvin Cooperman
- Producer: Burt Nodella
- Production locations: Austria; Rome, Italy
- Cinematography: Tony Imi
- Editor: Brian Smedley-Aston
- Running time: 150 minutes
- Production company: Taft Entertainment Television

Original release
- Network: CBS
- Release: April 22, 1984

Pope John Paul II is a 1984 American biopic drama television film based on the life of Karol Wojtyła, from his early days as an activist in Poland to his installation as Pope John Paul II. Written by Christopher Knopf and directed by Herbert Wise, the film stars Albert Finney, Caroline Bliss, Brian Cox, and John Forgeham. The film marks both Albert Finney's American television debut and the first script Finney had ever turned down upon initial reading.

== Synopsis ==
This film's timeline begins with the death of Pope John Paul I on September 28, 1978, and then flashes back to Karol Wojtyła as a young man growing up decades earlier in Wadowice, Poland. The storyline then returns to pre-October 16 dates in 1978 and flashes back to Wojtyła's early life, family relationships, his political involvements fighting against Nazism during World War II and against Communism afterwards in the Cold War, and his relationship and involvement in the Roman Catholic Church as he becomes a priest, a bishop, a cardinal, and is eventually elected pope.

== Cast ==
- Albert Finney as Karol Wojtyła, Pope John Paul II
- Caroline Bliss as Rosa Kossack
- Brian Cox as Father Góra
- John Forgeham as Officer Moljek
- Derek Francis as Bishop Lec
- Nigel Hawthorne as Cardinal Stefan Wyszynski
- Marne Maitland as Mountain Sacristan
- John McEnery as Mikołaj Kuczkowski
- Lee Montague as Ivan Konev
- Michael Müller as Pawel
- Jonathan Newth as Archbishop Adam Stefan Sapieha
- Derrick O'Connor as Swiacki
- Valentine Pelka as Boguslaw Banas
- Ronald Pickup as Jan Tyranowski
- Bruce Purchase as Jerzy Loparicz
- Andrew Ray as Stanisław Pigoń
- Vincent Riotta as Teodor Krawick
- William Simons as Foreman Krauze
- Patrick Stewart as Party Secretary Wladyslaw Gomulka
- Philip Stone as Archbishop Eugeniusz Baziak
- Kevin Stoney as Bishop Dygat
- Malcolm Tierney as Church Affairs Minister Skarzynski
- Fiona Walker as Anna Loparicz
- Tim Woodward as Juliusz Kydrynski
- Sam Dastor as Józef Teitelbaum
- Robert Austin as Hans Frank
- Michael Crompton as Young Karol Wojtyła
- Antony Brown as Father Zary
- Alfred Burke as Karol Wojtyła Sr.
- Victoria Fairbrother as Ruth Teitelbaum
- Kilian McKenna as Stefan Putrya
- Patrick Marley as Raczynski
- Neil Nisbet as Wiktor
- Natalie Slater as Hanna Jastrun
- Eve Slatner as Sister Jadwiga
- John Stacy as Grabowski
- Mario Viggiano as Franciszek
- Edwin Alexander Francis as Forest Guard

== Production ==
Once Karol Wojtyła was installed as Pope, executive producer Alvin Cooperman made his decision to create the film project, and with the assistance of the Roman Catholic Archdiocese of New York, sought Vatican approval and cooperation. After reviewing the script, the Vatican welcomed the project.

British actor Michael Compton portrayed Karol Wojtyła from ages 18 through 26, and Albert Finney portrayed Wojtyła from 27 years old, up to the time the former bishop was installed as Pope John Paul II. Finney had initially declined the role upon first reading the script, as he felt playing the role of someone so high-profile would be unnerving, but after re-reading the script, he accepted. Deciding that then-political problems in Poland would make shooting there problematical, producer Alvin Cooperman received permission to shoot in Yugoslavia, using Zagreb to represent Kraków. Three days before major filming was to commence, the Yugoslavian government rescinded permission and confiscated location footage that had already been shot. The production company was told they were not welcome due to the script's anti-Communist overtones as set by Wojtyła's disagreements with the Communist regime while he was a priest, cardinal and bishop. The project was subsequently filmed at locations in Austria, as well as in Italy in Caprarola and Rome.

The film debuted on CBS Television on Easter Sunday, April 22, 1984.

== Reception ==
The Day wrote that in their considering the difficulties in offering a project about an incumbent Pope, the filmmakers treated the subject "with verve - and honesty". In not being a true documentary film, the depiction of the life of Karol Wojtyła was not "tied to exact factual details", and included the addition "theatrical flourishes and appropriate emotional atmosphere", but still remained "a sound and vivid dramatization" reflecting the biographical record of a man whose "background had plenty of high drama in it without making it up". They did note that "some of the transitions were a bit ragged, and some of the ecclesiastical artificially stiff," but that "generally, the story has authenticity".

The Courier in noting that lead Albert Finney was Protestant, both director Herbert Wise and writer Christopher Knopf were Jewish, and cinematographer Tony Imi was Roman Catholic, wrote that the film was successful as "a compelling story about a man, rather than a religious tract about a pontiff." Producer Alvin Cooperman spoke toward the difficulties extant in writing about a living exalted person, and how he worked to dispel preconceptions that he was offering either a documentary or a "hallowed portrait" of (then-incumbent) John Paul II.

The New York Times made note of difficulties inherent in creating a film about a historical person while the person is living. They offered that while a person might be mythicized after their death, and might even be so when living, it is when they are living that a production company has boundaries, as "current images, common knowledge, popular consensus shape them." They wrote that this project was "at once enhanced and hindered by this." They granted that while Pope John Paul II's life story "is sure-fire for a biography", and viewers would likely have their own views and impressions of him, with his being a living subject, when it comes to historical accuracy, "A filmmaker can tamper with this only lightly, not only because heavy tampering would be distasteful, even irreverent, but because it would be jarring, an assault on our sensibilities." In the production company respecting this, the film becomes "almost a series of anecdotes."

Boston Globe made note that director Herbert Wise's choice of flashback to tell the story made the timeline easy to follow and allowed him to "introduce scenes from Wojtyła's early life in black and white." They applauded makeup artists for their making actor Albert Finney look "eerily like the Pope", and the actor himself for mastering "the Pope's stoop and his hand gestures". They found that in the director portraying "Wojtyła as a man without a flaw", the story itself was "without a moral dilemma and, therefore, without dramatic edge".

=== Accolades ===
AllRovi wrote that the screenplay by Christopher Knopf was "written with reverence and intelligence". The film received a 1985 WGA Awards nomination for writer Christopher Knopf for 'Original Drama Anthology'.
