= Edmund Wojtyła =

Polish doctor (1906–1932)

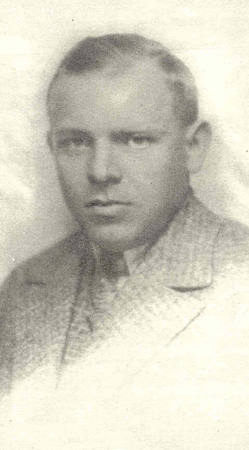
- Born: 27 August 1906; Kraków, Kingdom of Galicia and Lodomeria, Austria-Hungary
- Died: 4 December 1932 (aged 26); Bielsko-Biała, Poland
- Resting place: Rakowicki Cemetery
- Citizenship: Polish
- Education: Jagiellonian University (M.D.)
- Occupation: Doctor
- Father: Karol Wojtyła (senior)

Edmund Antoni Wojtyła (27 August 1906 – 4 December 1932) was a Polish doctor who died of scarlet fever a few years after graduating. He was the elder brother of Karol Wojtyła, the future Pope John Paul II.

== Biography ==
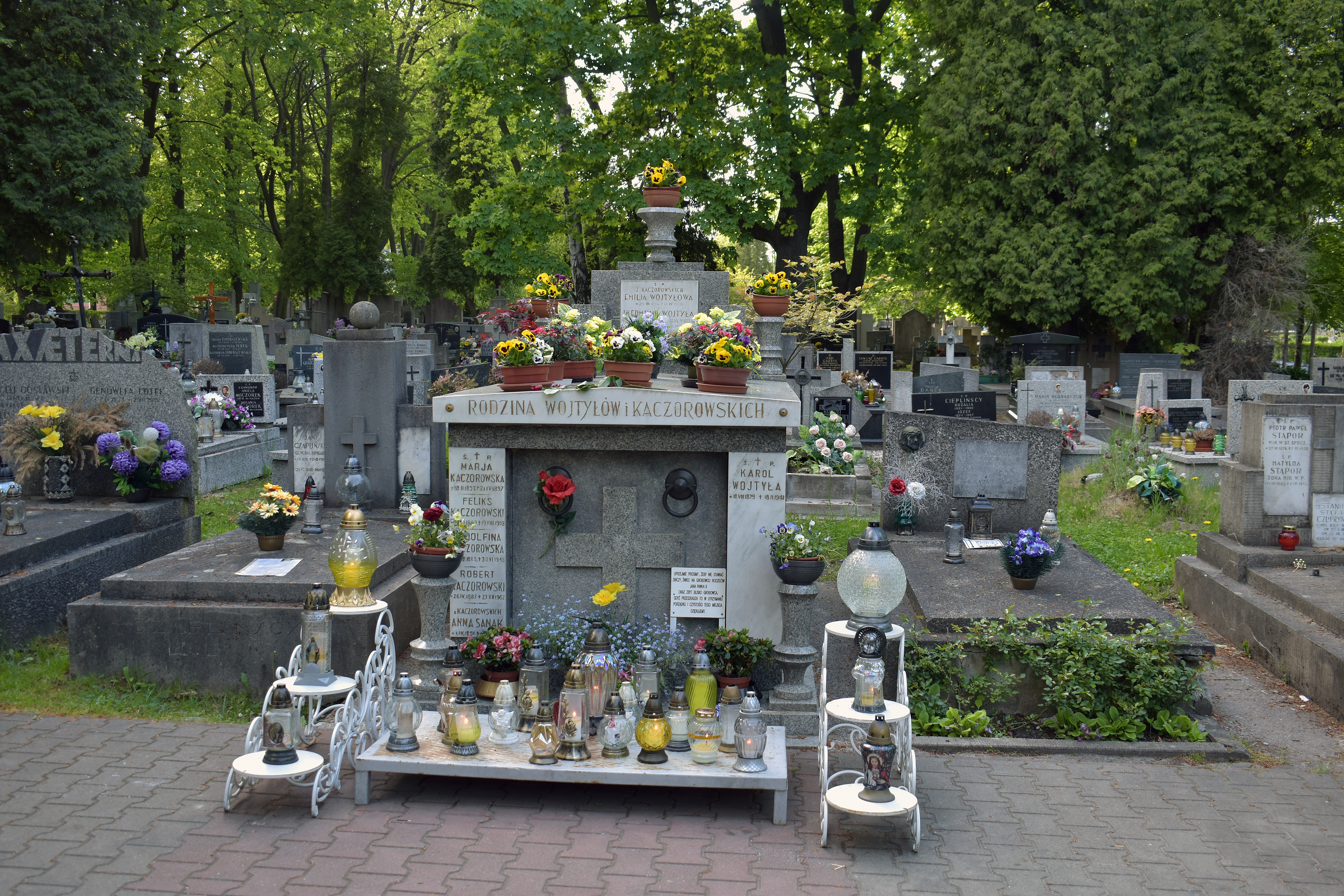
Edmund Wojtyła's tomb.

=== Early life and education ===
Wojtyła was born on 27 August 1906 in Kraków, Austria-Hungary, as the first child of Karol Wojtyła, then a military officer for the Austro-Hungarian Army, and Emily Wojtyła. During his early life he moved often due to his father's work. He moved to Wadowice in 1913, and later to Hranice after the start of the First World War.

After finishing primary school, Wojtyła was enrolled by his father in a military school in Enns, Austria. After the war ended and the Austro Hungarian empire collapsed, his family moved back to Wadowice, and during his time there his brother Karol (later known as Pope John Paul II) was born. He graduated from high school in Wadowice in 1924 and moved to Kraków.

Wojtyła started his medical studies in the Jagiellonian University's faculty of medicine in 1924, and he graduated from there in 1930.

=== Medical career and death ===
After graduating, Wojtyła started a internship as a doctor at a Children's Hospital in Kraków. In 1932, he became the second in command of the Bielsko-Biała city hospital. Later that year, he contracted scarlet fever from a young patient in the hospital.

On 4 December 1932, Wojtyła sucumbed to the disease. He was buried at a Catholic cemetery in Bielsko-Biała two days after his death, and was later moved to the Military Cemetery (Prandoty Street) in Kraków.

== Legacy ==
In 2003, the Bielsko-Biała general hospital was named after Wojtyła. That same year, a street in Wadowice was renamed from "Wesoła" Street to "Dr. Edmund Wojtyła" street. In 2006, a biographical film about his life was produced. In 2018, a hospital in Jaroszowiec was renamed after him.
