= Snakes on a Train =

2006 film

- DVD release cover
- Directed by: Peter Mervis (as The Mallachi Brothers)
- Written by: Eric Forsberg
- Produced by: David Michael Latt; David Rimawi
- Starring: Julia Ruiz; Giovanni Bejarano; Al Galvex
- Cinematography: Mark Atkins
- Edited by: Peter Mervis
- Music by: Mel Lewis
- Distributed by: The Asylum
- Release date: August 15, 2006
- Running time: 91 minutes
- Language: English
- Budget: $1,000,000

Snakes on a Train is a 2006 direct-to-video action thriller horror film released by The Asylum as a mockbuster on August 15, 2006. Aspects of the film are inspired by the film Snakes on a Plane, which was scheduled for theatrical release three days later on August 18, 2006.

== Plot ==
Although taking the same basic idea from Snakes on a Plane (many deadly snakes loose on a claustrophobic, high-speed means of transport), the background story of how the snakes end up on the train differs.

In the film, a woman called Alma has been put under a Mayan curse which causes snake eggs to hatch inside her belly and eat their way out. The curse was laid on her by her family, in revenge for marrying Brujo, who now accompanies her. In order to recover the "lost pieces" of herself (the snakes), she must travel to Los Angeles where a powerful Mayan shaman can lift the curse. She takes the snakes along with her in small jars. While on the train, bandits attack her, allowing the snakes to escape, endangering the other passengers.

Eventually, Brujo chants a spell to ease Alma's curse but instead causes her to transform into a gigantic snake herself. She devours him, slithers outside, and swallows the moving train whole.

Six passengers manage to escape the train before it enters her belly. Before Alma can devour them as well, one of them uses a talisman to make the monstrous snake vanish. However, one girl is shown to have been unknowingly bitten, suggesting that the curse will remain.

== Cast ==
- Alby Castro as Brujo
- Julia Ruiz as Alma
- Giovanni Bejarano as Miguel
- Amelia Jackson Gray as Crystal
- Shannon Gayle as Summer
- Lola Forsberg as Lani
- Carolyn Meyer as Klara
- Isaac Wade as Martin
- Madeleine Falk as Nancy
- Derek Osedach as Mitch
- Stephen A.F. Day as Conductor
- Al Galvex as Julio
- Jay Costelo as Juan
- Jason S. Gray as Chico
- Sean Durrie as Dickie
- Nick Slatkin as Raz

== Production ==
According to co-producer David Rimawi, The Asylum initially had no intention of making the film, but they proceeded when an earlier film project fell through. While looking for international distributors at Cannes, a group of Japanese investors saw the film's poster and asked if there really was a giant snake eating a train (which was originally not part of the film). In response, Rimawi had his crew in Los Angeles add the aforementioned scene to the film to make the Japanese audiences happy.

== Reception ==
The film has received mostly negative reviews. When reviewed by Variety magazine, it was described "neither undiscriminating action fans nor connoisseurs of high camp will find much bite in this latest direct-to-video product from The Asylum." Scott Foy, reviewing the film for Dread Central, asked "how the hell do you produce a rip-off this dispirited?"

== Crossover ==
Snakes on a Train is prominently featured in the 2022 film 2025 Armageddon. In the film's prologue, the two main characters become fans of The Asylum as children when their grandmother purchases Snakes on a Train for them, having mistaken it for Snakes on a Plane. Later, in the present, a giant snake attacks a subway train in Tokyo in the same fashion as in the ending of Snakes on a Train; this similarity helps the sisters realize the aliens attacking Earth with the creatures are mimicking The Asylum's films.

== See also ==
- List of killer snake films
