= Alien Abduction (2005 film) =

- Directed by: Eric Forsberg
- Written by: Eric Forsberg
- Produced by: David Michael Latt; David Rimawi; Paul Bales
- Starring: Megan Lee Ethridge; Griff Furst; Marissa Morse; Patrick Thomassie; Jilon Ghai; Lola Forsberg
- Distributed by: The Asylum
- Release date: April 26, 2005
- Running time: 90 minutes
- Country: United States
- Language: English

Alien Abduction is a 2005 science-fiction horror thriller film produced by The Asylum, and one of few by the same studio not produced to capitalize on the release of another film. It was released with the tagline: "The war of the worlds has just begun!", referencing the 1898 novel The War of the Worlds by H.G. Wells, which would be adapted to film by The Asylum two months later.

== Plot ==
The film begins with a group of carefree teenagers on a camping trip. As they spend the night drinking and hanging out, a light appears overhead.

Jean is the first to notice something wrong when she videotapes a UFO overhead. At first, her friends do not believe her and are unconvinced by the tape. That night while they are sitting around the campfire, the aliens attack. The four flee for their lives but cannot escape, and they are abducted. They wake up in a cell. Jean uses the camera's night vision to explore the alien glyphs and passages. They are eventually rounded up and pushed into a room where they are tied down and examined.

Jean awakens in a hospital, suffering from terrible flashbacks. That night, a shadowy figure sneaks into her room and staples something into the back of her neck, causing the flashbacks to stop and leaving Jean with no memory of the abduction.

Jean is questioned by a staff psychiatrist, Dr. Booker, who reveals that she is in a special facility for UFO abductees. She has to remain there until they are sure that she can resume a normal life. The military attache, Commander Shakti, wants her lobotomized. Jean breaks into another wing of the hospital to find her friends and discovers that one part of the hospital is reserved for mutants, the insane and the lobotomized. She sees a woman having her skull drilled. Jean is then captured by Shakti and given electric shock therapy until she is unconscious. When Jean wakes up, Shakti interrogates her and then sends her to an execution room. Jean lobotomizes the nurse instead and disguises the nurse as herself by covering her with gore. She wanders around the basement, looking for a way out through the vents, until she finds an empty storage room. Jean explores the area, eventually uncovering her things in a box labeled with her name. She also finds her video camera with the tape missing, but still with its memory stick. Jean replays the video and is shocked to see the entire abduction on tape. She escapes the storage room, killing a guard on the way. She also sees and tapes a scientist tending alien larvae in a lab and a scientist masturbating the aliens' genitals to extract sperm.

Jean breaks into a worker's locker room and disguises herself. There, she runs into her doctor Thomas. She finds out that the aliens have escaped and are infecting the facility.

When the infected are killed, alien larvae crack out of their skulls and escape. Jean and Thomas try to save her friends, but they are a mess, and Todd barely remembers Jean. Jean gets them to safety, but Todd turns on them. Thomas shows Jean the way out and reveals that the hospital is actually part of the alien ship. Todd kills Britney and Thomas, and an alien larva bursts out of Thomas' head just as he dies. An adult alien captures Jean, but she shoots it in the throat.

Later, Jean finds herself in another lab, looking at a series of human clones of her and her friends. Shakti explains that Jean died in the abduction, and she was a clone. Jean furiously kills her clone by pulling out its umbilical cord. All the people who appear to be humans on the ship are actually just vessels containing aliens, and Dr. Shakti intends to replace as many humans as possible with members of the alien race in cloned human bodies. Dr. Brooks removes Jean's memory suppression chip, and she now has access to the aliens' collective memory. This enables her to recognize the alien symbols and numbers shown to her on cards that she had not recognized when her memory was suppressed. She says that she is now "ready to serve" out the mission from Earth.

Jean, Todd, Bud, and Britney suddenly find themselves hiking in the woods on a sunny day. A search and rescue helicopter spots them. They tell the rescue team that they are fine. An army officer asks Jean, "Where have you been for the last two weeks?" The movie ends with Jean giving him a look.

== Cast ==
- Megan Lee Ethridge as Jean
- Griff Furst as Todd
- Marissa Morse as Britney
- Patrick Thomassie as Bud
- Jilon Ghai as Thomas
- Bobby James as Dr. Booker
- Claudia Katz as Major Shakti
- Edwin Craig as The Director
- Angela Landis as Nurse White
- Deirdre Schweisow as Nurse Green
- Amanda Weier as Captain Helens
- Robert Lucchesi as Lieutenant Biggs
- Scott F. Evans as Staffer Maurice
- Butch Leonard as Staffer Franks
- Lola Forsberg as Bonnie
- Justin Sloan as Private Strict
- Jared Cohn as Private Smalls

== Reception ==
The review site The Zone gave the film three stars, stating that it was "cursed with ambitions beyond its meagre resources".
