= John Forgeham =

British actor (1941–2017)

- Born: John Henry George Forgeham; 14 May 1941; Kidderminster, Worcestershire, England
- Died: 10 March 2017 (aged 75); Worthing, West Sussex, England
- Occupation: Actor
- Years active: 1963–2012
- Spouse(s): Georgina Hale (actress/divorced); Fiesta mei Ling (actress/divorced); Arlene Garciano (2004–2006)
- Children: 2

John Henry George Forgeham (14 May 1941 – 10 March 2017) was an English actor known for his television work, notably the role of businessman Frank Laslett in the ITV series Footballers' Wives.

== Early life ==
Born in Kidderminster, Worcestershire, Forgeham moved to Erdington, Birmingham as a child, and trained at the Royal Academy of Dramatic Art (RADA) on a two-year scholarship (1962–1964) from where he graduated with a RADA Silver medal for Best Performance student.

== Career ==
=== Stage ===
Forgeham was a member of the Royal Shakespeare Company (RSC) (from 1966 until 1972) and toured with the company both nationally and internationally. Whilst on tour in Australia he decided to stay longer than anticipated and founded the Globe Shakespeare Theatre in Sydney.

=== Television ===
His many television credits include: The Avengers, Z-Cars, The Stone Tape, Crossroads, The Sweeney, Ivanhoe, Beau Geste, Minder, Footballers' Wives, The Professionals, Shoestring, Juliet Bravo, C.A.T.S. Eyes, Give Us a Break, Lovejoy, Bergerac, The Governor, Pulaski, Making Out, Nice Work, Prime Suspect, London's Burning, Casualty, The Bill, Doctors and as Reg Pendleton in the Heartbeat episode, Rumours.

=== Film ===
Film appearances include: The Italian Job (1969), Adolf Hitler: My Part in His Downfall (1973), Spy Story (1976), Sheena (1984), Pope John Paul II (1984), The Laughter of God (1990), King of the Wind (1990), The Young Americans (1993), Staggered (1994), The Road to Ithaca (1999), Kiss of the Dragon (2001), Mean Machine (2001), Torture Room (2007) and Dead Man Running (2009).

== Later life and death ==
Forgeham was co-writing his biography with his friend novelist, screenwriter and producer Simon W. Golding (https://www.imdb.com/name/nm0325715/?ref_=fn_t_1) when he died. Golding gave tribute to Forgeham in many national news outlets, including the BBC.

In 2004 he appeared in the second series of the ITV weight loss show, Celebrity Fit Club. He replaced Freddie Starr as team captain, but was demoted five weeks later, the role being taken by James Whitaker.

Forgeham died suddenly from internal bleeding after breaking a collarbone when falling out of bed at his care home in Worthing, West Sussex on 10 March 2017, at the age of 75.

== Filmography ==
=== Film ===
Year	Title	Role	Notes
1969	The Italian Job	Frank	
1973	Adolf Hitler: My Part in His Downfall	Wally	
1976	Spy Story	Security Guard	
1976	One Hour to Zero	Sam Rogers	
1984	Sheena	Jorgenson	
1987	L'inchiesta	Marco	
1990	King of the Wind	Blacksmith	
1994	Staggered	Inspector Lubbock	
1997	Remember Me?	Police Inspector	
1999	The Road to Ithaca	Kemal Ahmed	
2001	Kiss of the Dragon	Max	
2001	Mean Machine	Charlie Sykes	
2007	Pledge of Allegiance	Mr. Green	
2009	Dead Man Running	Terry Biggs	
2011	The Fencers	Cornel Wilde	Short film

=== Television ===
Year	Title	Role	Notes
1961	Spy-Catcher	Jeep Driver	Episode: "Doves of War"
1963	No Hiding Place	Joe Dean	Episode: "Pay As You Earn"
1963	The Edgar Wallace Mystery Theatre	Adrian Marlowe	Episode: "The Partner"
1963–1974	Z Cars	Ted O'Neill/Drew	2 episodes
1964	ITV Play of the Week	Private Elliot	Episode: "Jacko At War"
1965	The Avengers	Beale	Episode: "The Murder Market"
1966	The Idiot	Keller	3 episodes
1966	The Wednesday Play	Fisher	Episode: "Why Aren't You Famous?"
1966	Seven Deadly Sins	Kenny	Episode: "The Erpingham Camp"
1966	Thirteen Against Fate	Victor	Episode: "The Suspect"
1967	The Fellows	Des	2 episodes
1970	Dynasty	Jason Werner	Episode: "Catwalk"
1970	Homicide	Ken Thornton	Episode: "Doris and Daphne"
1971–1972	Catwalk	Saxon Wells	14 episodes
1972	The Stone Tape	Maudsley	Television film
1973	Chaser	Unknown	Television film
1973	The Brothers	Mortimer	Episode: "Errors of Judgement"
1974	Father Brown	Simeon Barnes	Episode: "The Hammer of God"
1975	The Sweeney	Dennis Rawlins	Episode: "The Placer"
1975	Churchill's People	John Morice	Episode: "Mutiny"
1976	The Expert	Warder	Episode: "Fail Safe"
1976–1978	Crossroads: King's Oak	Jim Baines	41 episodes
1980	Tales of the Unexpected	Police Officer	Episode: "The Hitch-Hiker"
1980	Minder	George	Episode: "Whose Wife Is It Anyway?"
1980	The Professionals	D.S. Colin	Episode: "Take Away"
1980	Play for Today	Gent at Hospital	Episode: "Number on End"
1980	Shoestring	Terry Bowen	Episode: "Another Man's Castle"
1981	The Incredible Mr Tanner	Mick	Episode: "The Wallet"
1981	Crown Court	Special Constable Copesley	Episode: "Freedom to Incite: Part 1"
1981	Strangers	Red Keegan	Episode: "Soldiers of Misfortune"
1981	Juliet Bravo	Clive Temple	Episode: "Catching Up"
1982	Ivanhoe	Front's Lieutenant	Television film
1982	L for Lester	Alf Bayley	6 episodes
1982	Saturday Night Thriller	Inspector Heneker	Episode: "A Gift of Tongues"
1982	Beau Geste	Sgt. Maj. Lejaune	6 episodes
1983	A Married Man	Detective Inspector Blackett	2 episodes
1983	Give Us a Break	Brindly	2 episodes
1984	Ever Decreasing Circles	Lorry Driver	Episode: "The New Neighbour"
1984	Killer Exposed	Det. Insp. George Hawthorne	Television film
1984	Pope John Paul II	Officer Moljek	Television film
1984	Sakharov	Unknown	Television film
1985	Ties of Blood	Sergeant	Television film
1985–1987	C.A.T.S. Eyes	Harry Hopkins/Landlord/Alan Dyer	3 episodes
1986	Duty Free	Sheridan	Episode: "Costa Del Crime"
1986	Lovejoy	Arnold	Episode: "To Sleep No More"
1986	Boon	Lenny Gates	Episode: "For Whom the Chimes Toll"
1986	Prospects	Jock	Episode: "Rodent Engineers"
1986	Big Deal	Manners	Episode: "Following in Father's Footsteps"
1986–1997	Casualty	Steve Meacham/Sgt. Shaw	2 episodes
1987	Y.E.S.	Wensbury	Episode: "Muscle"
1987	Bulman	Edwin Gilbert	Episode: "Chinese Whispers"
1987	Pulaski	Georgie Fowler	Episode: "Violence, Love and Ratings"
1987	Divided We Stand	Taxi Driver	Episode: "Episode #1.1"
1987	Ernie's Incredible Illucinations	German Officer	Television film
1988	Bergerac	Arnie Spivak	Episode: "Private Fight"
1988	Final Run	McMorris	4 episodes
1988	Casting Off	Tim	4 episodes
1988	Journey's End	Company Sergeant Major	Television film
1988–1997	London's Burning	Elkins/Commander	6 episodes
1989	Storyboard	McPhee	Episode: "Snakes and Ladders"
1989	Nice Work	Brian Everthorpe	4 episodes
1989	Precious Bane	Huglet	Television film
1989–1991	Making Out	Frankie	14 episodes
1990	Not a Penny More, Not a Penny Less	Ronnie	Television film
1990	Birds of a Feather	C.I.D. Officer	Episode: "Muesli"
1990	This Is David Harper	Billy 'Paving Stone' Adams	Episode: "Partners in Crime?"
1991	T. Bag and the Rings of Olympus	Duke of Florence	Episode: "Leonardo"
1991	Screen Two	Hateley	Episode: "The Laughter of God"
1991	Prime Suspect	DCI John Shefford	Episode: "Price to Pay: Part 1"
1991	Chalkface	Gerry Lambert	Episode: "Christmas Cheer"
1991–1998	The Ruth Rendell Mysteries	Pub Landlord/Det. Insp. Baker	5 episodes
1992	Heartbeat	Reg Pendleton	Episode: "Rumours"
1992–1999	The Bill	D.I. Cameron/John Liddle	2 episodes
1993	The Comic Strip Presents...	Sergeant	Episode: "Detectives on the Edge of a Nervous Breakdown"
1993	All in the Game	Freddie Matthews	6 episodes
1994	Pie in the Sky	Jack Meynell	Episode: "Endangered Species"
1994	Blue Heaven	Jim Sandford	6 episodes
1994	Pleasure	Police Chief	Television film
1994	Crocodile Shoes	Bernie Marks	Episode: "The Deal"
1996	The Bare Necessities	Big Vinnie	Television film
1996	The Governor	Governor Wrexham	2 episodes
1996	Cold Lazarus	Tramp	Episode: "Episode #1.2"
1996	The Knock	Denny Peters	Episode: "Episode #2.9"
1996	Seed	Julie's Dad	Television film
1996	Family Money	BBC Colleague	Television film
1997	The New Adventures of Robin Hood	Lord Garth	Television film
1997	The Fix	Alan Hardaker	Television film
1998	The Echo	Charlie	2 episodes
2002	NCS Manhunt	DS Gordon Bilboe	2 episodes
2002–2004	Footballers' Wives	Frank Laslett	21 episodes
2003	Born and Bred	Lucio Braithwaite	Episode: "A Very Ormston Christmas"
2004	All About Me	Piggott	Episode: "Where There's Blame"
2005	The Last Detective	Bernie Wilson	Episode: "Three Steps to Hendon"
2005	Dream Team	Phil the Stadium Manager	Episode: "Marathon Man"
2007	Rhona's Pantry	Roy	Television series
2012	Doctors	Nigel Whitely	Episode: "Tales of the Rather Expected"
