= Theatre Building Chicago =

- Interactive map of Theatre Building Chicago
- Address: 1225 West Belmont Avenue; Chicago; United States
- Coordinates: 41.93951°N 87.660017°W

Construction
- Opened: 1977
- Closed: 2010/ 2012
- Architect: Crombie Taylor

The Theatre Building Chicago is the former name of a theater building located in Chicago's Lakeview neighborhood. The Theatre Building Chicago once referred to both the three theatres that are in the space, as well as the producing organization that is based on the premises. The building was sold to Stage 773 in 2010. The producing organization was later rebranded as Chicago Muse and folded in 2012.

== History ==
In its lifetime, Theatre Building Chicago hosted over 800 plays; 9,000 events; 500 theatre companies; 1,078,000 audience members; 29,400 actors, designers, directors and other theatre artists appearing in over 25,000 performances.

Many theatre companies utilized the Theatre Building Chicago as a space for one long-running play, but In 1988 TBC initiated “United Stages at Theatre Building” in response to several companies’ requesting a seasonal home base rather than a spot for a single show. Six companies comprised United Stages: Absolute Theatre Company, American Blues Theater, Chicago Shakespeare Theater, Commons Theatre, Immediate Theatre and Touchstone Theatre. “United Stages at Theatre Building” lasted through the 1989 and 1990 seasons.

In 1997 the Illinois Theatre Association honored the Theatre Building Chicago with an Outstanding Contribution Award for twenty years of service.

Other notable companies that TBC hosted: Bailiwick Repertory Theatre, Chicago Theatre Project, Emerald City Theatre, Famous Door Theatre Company, Griffin Theatre Company, Porchlight Music Theatre, and Provision Theatre.

== Notable Connections ==
- The first show in the theatre on March 15, 1977 was Cap Streeter, a musical about a Chicago legend, produced by the Dinglefest Theatre Company.
- Steppenwolf’s first show in the city of Chicago, Say Good Night, Gracie, opened November, 1979 at the Theatre Building Chicago and performed through early 1980 and featured John Malkovich and Austin Pendleton.
- Morning Call (play)|Morning Call was the first televised play in Chicago in 1982. Tony Randall was the MC in this NBC and Steppenwolf Theatre joint endeavor.
- Tooth of Crime by Sam Shepard, a Remains Theatre presentation in 1982, featured Gary Cole and William Petersen.
- Jeremy Piven performed in the Next Theatre Company’s presentation of Knuckle in 1989.
- Lookingglass Theatre Company presented West in 1991 with David Schwimmer.
- American Blues Theater presented Keith Reddin’s Peacekeeper in 1990. The play was directed by David Petrarca and featured company members Kate Buddeke, Jim Leaming and Carmen Roman.
- Mark Hollmann joined a Theatre Building Chicago workshop for musical theatre writers in 1987. TBC presented his new musical Wild Goat in 2004.
