= Night of the Dead =

- Directed by: Eric Forsberg
- Written by: Eric Forsberg
- Produced by: Eric Forsberg
- Starring: Louis Graham; Joey Jalalian; Gabriel Womack; Deirdre V. Lyons; Lola Forsberg; David Reynolds
- Cinematography: John Bickford; David Frank
- Edited by: Mary Ann Skweres
- Music by: Robert Bayless
- Production company: Cerebral Experiment
- Distributed by: The Asylum
- Release date: June 28, 2006 (Los Angeles)
- Running time: 89 minutes
- Country: United States
- Language: English

Night of the Dead is a 2006 American horror film written and directed by Eric Forsberg. It stars Louis Graham as Dr. Gabriel Schreklich, a scientist who seeks to resurrect his dead family.

== Plot ==
Dr. Gabriel Schreklich loses his wife and daughter. Distraught, he finds The Institute for Life Extension, where he tries to find a way to resurrect the dead. Schreklich's nephew, Peter, helps him not knowing that his pregnant wife, Anais, is in danger. Schreklich's experiments are a success, and his family is brought back to a semblance of life, but they are now ghouls, in pain and hungry for the flesh of the living. When they escape their confinement, the whole institute is put at risk.

== Cast ==
- Louis Graham as Dr. Gabriel Schreklich
- Joey Jalalian as Anais Sturben
- Gabriel Womack as Peter Sturben
- Deirdre V. Lyons as Schatzi
- Lola Forsberg as Christi
- Dave Reynolds as Gunther
- Mary Christina Brown as Lith

== Production ==
Night of the Dead was produced by director Eric Forsberg's own production company, Cerebral Experiment. Forsberg sold his house to finance the film. It was shot in a single location.

== Release ==
The original title for Night of the Dead was Night of the Leben Tod, which later turned into Night of the Dead: Leben Tod. The Asylum simplified the film's title to Night of the Dead when they purchased the movie in 2006.

== Reception ==
In The Zombie Movie Encyclopedia, Volume 2, Peter Dendle wrote that the film is a low budget ripoff of Re-Animator with minimal changes, such as changing the color of the reagent and giving the antagonist an occasional German accent. Steve Anderson of Film Threat rated the film 1/5 stars and called it a low budget knockoff of Re-Animator. Milos Jovanovic of HorrorTalk rated 3/5 stars and wrote, "Night of the Dead: Leben Tod is not quite Bad Taste or Braindead, but it's a step in that direction, and a good one."
