= Brody Hutzler =

American actor (born 1971)

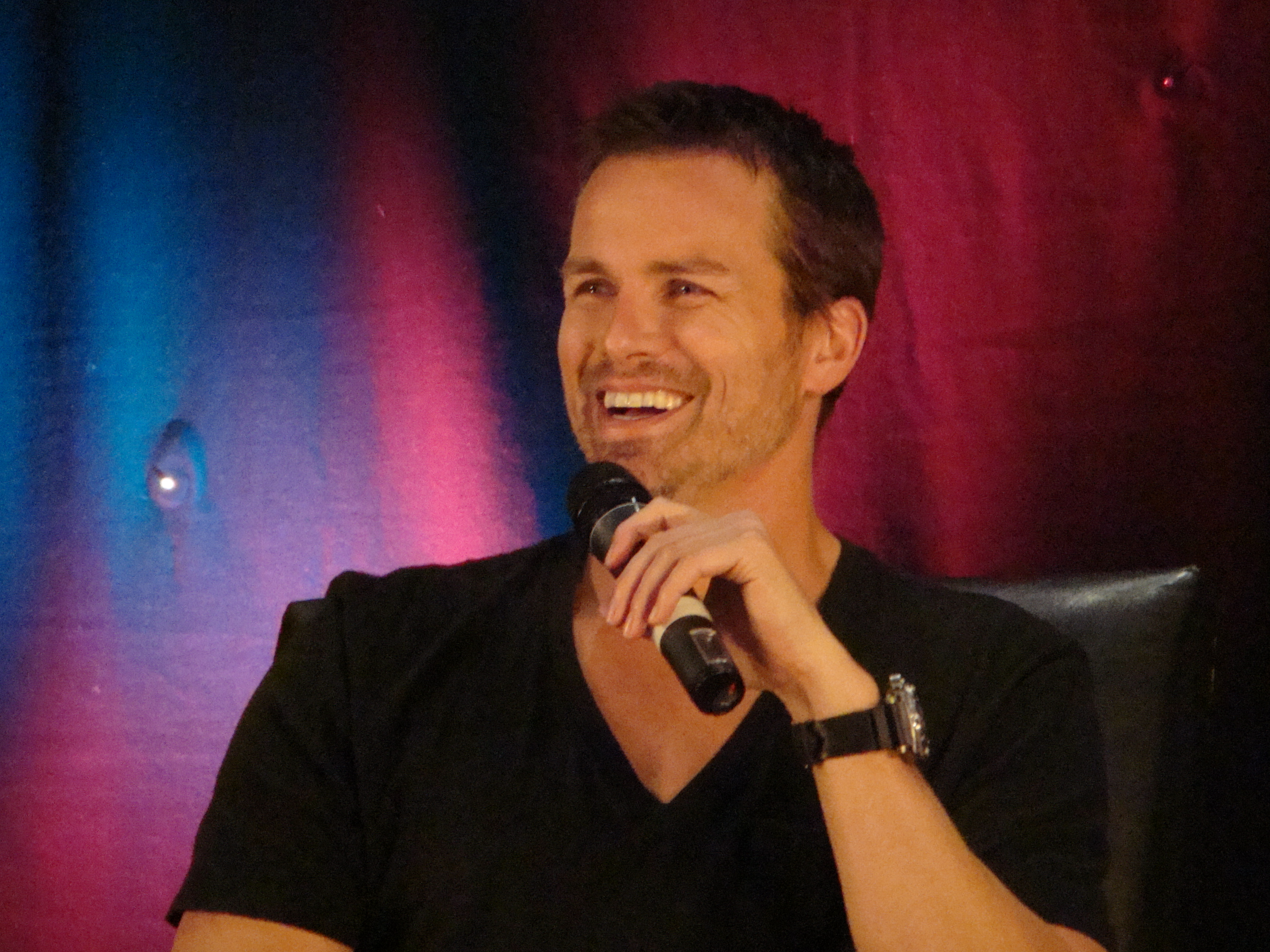
- Hutzler in June 2010
- Born: Ian Brody Hutzler; April 20, 1971 (age 55); Fairbanks, Alaska, U.S.
- Occupation: Actor
- Years active: 1995–2018

Ian Brody Hutzler (born April 20, 1971) is an American actor.

== Early life ==
Ian Brody Hutzler was born on April 20, 1971, in Fairbanks, Alaska. He attended Michigan State University before relocating to Los Angeles.

== Career ==
Hutzler played the role of Zachary Smith on Guiding Light from 1996 to 1997 and the role of Cody Dixon on The Young and the Restless from 1999 to 2004 before moving on to Days of Our Lives, where he played the role of Patrick Lockhart from 2004 to 2007. He has also made several television guest appearances on shows, such as The WB series Charmed and Angel and the short-lived 2000 NBC series, Titans. He also starred in the 2008 film Green Flash, along with Torrey DeVitto and Kristin Cavallari. In 2011, he played Navy Lieutenant Michael Jensen in NCIS. In 2012, he played Jason Sheridan in Ringer. In 2015, he appeared in the film Mega Shark vs. Kolossus.

== Filmography ==
Film roles
Year	Title	Role	Notes
2001	Legally Blonde	Grant	
2001	Totally Blonde	Brad Wilson	
2007	Be My Baby	Jason	
2008	Green Flash	Jeremy Madden	
2009	Chasing Forever	Michael Jensen	Short film
2010	Raven	Brick	
2011	Sebastian	Lester	
2012	Serial Dater	Adam	Short film
2012	Devils Inside	Jonathan Brando	
2014	On Georgia's Mind	Handsome Man	Short film
2014	Pop Star Puppy	Andrew	
2015	Mega Shark vs. Kolossus	Joshua Dane	
2016	Presumed (aka Marriage of Lies)	Tye Wilson	
2016	Dance Night Obsession	Quinn	
2017	The Wrong Nanny	Tanner	
2017	The Intruders	Isaac	
2018	Intensive Care	John	

Television roles
Year	Title	Role	Notes
1995	Saved by the Bell: The New Class	Craig	Episode: "Boundaries"
1996–97	Guiding Light	Zachary Smith	
1999	Malibu, CA	Darren	Episode: "The Game Show"
1999–04	The Young and the Restless	Cody Dixon	84 episodes
2000	Charmed	Max	Episode: "Heartbreak City"
2000	Titans	Billy Bastion	Episode: "Pilot"
2000	Ally McBeal	Chris Melnick	Episode: "Girls' Night Out"
2001–02	Angel	Landok	5 episodes
2002	Birds of Prey	Mercenary	Episode: "Three Birds and a Baby"
2003	She Spies	Brad Cummings	Episode: "Betrayal"
2003	I'm with Her	Male Star	Episode: "Pilot"
2003	7th Heaven	Paul	Episode: "Charity Begins at Home"
2003–07	Days of Our Lives	Patrick Lockhart / Brian	851 episodes
2005	Miss USA 2005	Himself / Celebrity Judge	TV special
2006	Las Vegas	Travis	Episode: "Lyle & Substance"
2009	Family Guy	Shovin' Buddy	Episode: "Peter's Progress"
2010	NCIS	Navy Lt. Michael Jensen	Episode: "Jurisdiction"
2011–12	The Bay	Kenneth Allen	4 episodes
2012	Ringer	Jeff Sheridan	Episode: "It Just Got Normal"
2012	I Hate My Teenage Daughter	Paul	Episode: "Teenage Date Night"
2013	Baby Daddy	Johnathan	Episode: "New Bonnie vs. Old Ben"
2013	Hot in Cleveland	Andy	Episodes: "Look Who's Hot Now" and "All My Exes"
2013	A Snow Globe Christmas	Hugh	Lifetime TV movie
2014	Petals on the Wind	Male Guest	Lifetime TV movie
2017	Stage Fright	Ryan	Lifetime TV movie
