= Amy Rider =

American actress

- Born: Amy Rider; 1985 (age 40–41); Tokyo, Japan
- Occupations: Actress, film director
- Years active: 2005–present

Amy Rider (born 1985) is a Japanese-American actress and film director. She has played roles in several films including Katrina, Mega Shark vs. Kolossus, and Broken Links. She appeared in the television series 24: Conspiracy and Veronica Mars and had a reoccurring role as Alice Valko in the television series The Secret Life of the American Teenager.

== Early life ==
Rider was born in Tokyo, Japan. The majority of Rider's schooling was in Japan; by her estimation, her family moved within the country about 11 different times.

== Career ==
Rider states that she fell into acting because she was looking for an easy "A" so she took a drama class. Rider ended up being cast as the lead in the school play which made her think that acting might be something that she could put her focus into. Amy Rider's debut was in Head Cases in 2005. Her career would continue with the television series 24: Conspiracy, and she would make a cameo in Without a Trace. Rider's first film debut was After Midnight: Life Behind Bars in 2006. She later made an appearance in Veronica Mars in 2006 followed up by the film Kissing Cousins in 2008, and Privileged in 2010.

In 2008 Rider had her breakthrough performance playing Alice Valko in the television series The Secret Life of the American Teenager. Rider was a common recurring character throughout the entire series until its finale in 2013. During this time she also had film roles in The Monogamy Experiment and in Mega Shark vs. Kolossus. In 2016 she was cast in the film Broken Links.

== Filmography ==
=== Film ===
Year	Title	Role	Notes
2006	The Hitman Chronicles	Tanya	
2007	The List	Asian Waitress	
2007	Universal Remote	Tina / Various	
2008	Kissing Cousins	Toyoka	
2008	Pluzman	Girlfriend	Short
2009	Courage Is	Alice Valko	Video short
2010	Kill Speed	Shizuko	
2010	Privileged	Sophomore Girl	
2014	The Monogamy Experiment		Short
2015	Mega Shark vs. Kolossus	Moira King	
2015	Clappy	Penelope	Short
2016	Broken Links	Andrea	

=== Television ===
Year	Title	Role	Notes
2005	Head Cases	Drama Queen	"Be Your Best You"
2005	24: Conspiracy	Kelly	TV miniseries short
2006	After Midnight: Life Behind Bars	Asian Girl #1	TV film
2006	Without a Trace	Maddie Porter	"Shattered"
2006	Veronica Mars	Charlotte	"Charlie Don't Surf"
2007	Campus Ladies	Ashley	"Safety First"
2007	Frank TV	Cristina Yang	"Frankly, My Dear, I Don't Give a Frank", "Ballpark Frank"
2007	Katrina	Setsu	TV film
2007-08	Big Shots	Riko Mara	"The Way We Weren't", "The Better Man"
2008-13	The Secret Life of the American Teenager	Alice Valko	Regular role
2018	Z Nation	Chef Amy	Season 5
