= Józef Jaklicz =

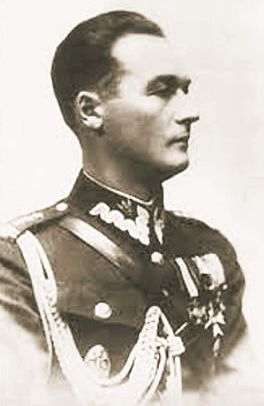
Józef Jalicz

Józef Jaklicz (17 September 1894 – 3 July 1974) was a soldier of the Austro-Hungarian Army and the Polish Legions in World War I, and officer of the Polish Army in the Second Polish Republic, nominated to the rank of General brygady. He fought in World War I, Polish–Soviet War, Polish–Ukrainian War and the Invasion of Poland.

== Life ==
Jaklicz was born on 17 September 1894 in Kraków. After graduation from high school, he studied philosophy at the Jagiellonian University, and was active member of the Polish Sokol movement. In August 1914, Jaklicz joined 3rd Infantry Regiment of the Polish Legions. Promoted to the rank of company commander, he fought in Eastern Carpathians, Bessarabia and Volhynia. Following the creation of the Polish Auxiliary Corps, Jaklicz became a staff officer, and after its dissolution, he joined Polska Siła Zbrojna (Polnische Wehrmacht).

In late 1918, Jaklicz entered the Polish Army, and was named commandant of a battalion of the 36th Academic Legion Infantry Regiment, which fought in the Battle of Lemberg (1918). After serving briefly under Colonel Władysław Sikorski, in March 1919, he was transferred to the staff of 9th Infantry Division, where he remained until December 1919. From 2 January until 15 April 1920 Jaklicz attended a military course at the College of Polish General Staff. During the Polish–Soviet War, he was chief of staff of 15th Infantry Division, and then commandant of 25th Infantry Regiment. In late 1920, Jaklicz went to France, to study at Ecole Militaire.

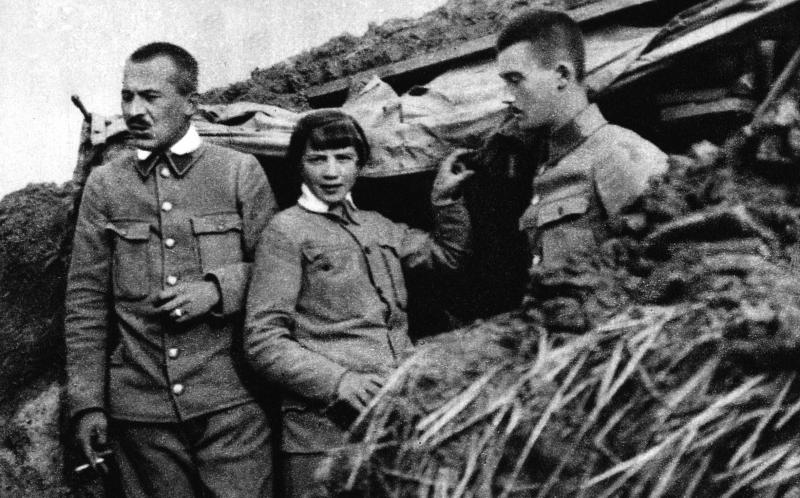
Józef Jaklicz (first on the right) while serving in the Polish Legions, 1915

Upon his return to Poland (March 1923) he was nominated to the post of officer of Polish General Staff, and was named chief of a department at the III Bureau, where he remained until December 1924. Jaklicz then lectured at Higher War School, but in April 1929 he was named commandant of 12th Infantry Regiment from Wadowice. Jaklicz lived in Wadowice until June 1932, returning then to the Higher War School. In December 1934 he was transferred to the 15th Infantry Division, which was located at Bydgoszcz.

In October 1935 Jaklicz once again was named chief of the III Bureau of the General Staff, remaining there until March 1939, when he was named deputy of the II Bureau of the General Staff. This was his last official post in the Second Polish Republic: Jaklicz remained in the II Bureau until 18 September 1939, when he crossed the Polish-Romanian border.

After escaping to Romania, Jaklicz was interned for a while, and then managed to get to France. He was named commandant of infantry of the 2nd Infantry Division, and after the fall of France, he remained in the occupied country. As leader of underground Polish Army in France, he organized evacuation routes for Poles in Marseille and Grenoble. In May 1944 Jaklicz left for Great Britain, where he served in Center of Infantry Training. Demobilized in September 1947, he returned to France and settled there. On 1 January 1964 Polish Commander in Chief, Władysław Anders, promoted him to General brygady.

Jaklicz died in Paris on 3 July 1974. He was buried at Les Champeaux Cemetery in Montmorency.

== Ranks ==
- Chorąży – 25 June 1915,
- Podporucznik – 28 April 1916,
- Poruchik – 1 November 1916,
- Captain – 1918,
- Major – 1919,
- Podpolkovnik – 1924,
- Polkovnik – 1930
- General brygady – 1 January 1964.

== Honors and awards ==
- Silver Cross of the Virtuti Militari (1921),
- Cross of Independence
- Officer's Cross of the Order of Polonia Restituta,
- Cross of Valour (Poland),
- Gold Cross of Merit (Poland),
- Legion of Honour (1928).

== Sources ==
- Tadeusz Kryska-Karski i Stanisław Żurakowski, Generałowie Polski Niepodległej, Editions Spotkania, Warsaw 1991
