= Hannah Cowley (actress) =

British actress and director (born 1981)

- Born: Hannah Cowley; 5 November 1981 (age 44); Islington, London, U.K.
- Education: University of Sydney (BA); University of New South Wales
- Relatives: Charles Cowley (great-great-uncle)

Hannah Cowley (born 5 November 1981) is an English actress and director.

== Early life and education ==
Cowley was born and raised in Islington, London, the great grand-niece of Charles Cowley. While studying ballet at the London Studio Centre of Dance, she gained fame as a child model and filmed over 30 commercials. Cowley attended Prior Weston Primary School before moving to Australia. She graduated from the University of Sydney with honours I in history, then accepted a place in the PhD program at University of New South Wales.

== Career ==
Cowley performed with the London Studio Centre of Dance in the ballets Carousel and Godspell, at Sadler's Wells Theatre in London.

Cowley's television debut was in Neighbours, as Angie Gleason; she went on to film the first season of Merrick and Rosso as Chastity, and appeared with Jimmy Fallon in a 2011 sketch for Universal Studios and the fourth season of Easy to Assemble, created by Illeana Douglas. She also appeared as Cersei Lannister in a 2011 parody of Game of Thrones for G4 (U.S. TV channel).

A noted model, Cowley was the face of Napoleon Perdis "Astro Girl" campaign, Air Tahiti Nui. She was one of the first real models to be used by make-up giant Benefit Cosmetics.

Cowley's on-screen film work has included Get Him to the Greek, Bernard Rose's Two Jacks, Mega Shark Versus Crocosaurus as the arrogant rich businesswoman Legatt in the beginning of the film, Ghost Soldiers, Haunting of the Innocent, The Atticus Institute, In The Blood, and Bereave.

Cowley's directorial debut came at the SFC Cannes 2008. Her work was subsequently selected for the St John's International Women's Film Festival 2008. Flame of the West (2008), which she also wrote, produced and starred in, is distributed in North America by Moviola. Her second film, Mere Image (2010) was chosen for the 2010 The Valley Film Festival. She has been an active contributor to literary and cinema magazines since working on an edition of Film Courage, after a screening of Mere Image at the Film Courage Interactive.

== Filmography ==
=== Film ===
Year	Title	Role	Notes
2008	The Kiss	Azura	
2008	An American Carol	Award Model	Uncredited
2009	Play the Game	Girl with Football	Uncredited
2009	World Full of Nothing	Ashleigh Cooper	
2010	Get Him to the Greek	VH1 Audience Member	
2010	Mega Shark Versus Crocosaurus	Legatt	
2012	Ghost Soldiers	Diana Chenon	
2012	Two Jacks	Angel	
2014	Haunting of the Innocent	Beyla	
2014	In the Blood	Monique Grant	
2014	Shock Value	Gina	
2014	The Wedding Dress	Young Margot / Ronnie / Isabel	
2015	The Atticus Institute	Young Susan Gorman	
2015	Bereave	Natalie	
2015	Maidens of the Sea	The Mermaid	

=== Television ===
Year	Title	Role	Notes
2000	Neighbours	Angie Gleason	Episode #1.3509
2005	The B Team	Chastity	1 episode
2007	Comedy Central Roast of Flavor Flav	—N/a	Television special
2011	Xplay	Queen Zelda	1 episode
2012	Easy to Assemble	Reece	5 episodes
