= Mega Shark Versus Kolossus =

- DVD cover
- Directed by: Christopher Douglas-Olen Ray
- Written by: Edward DeRuiter
- Starring: Illeana Douglas; Amy Rider; Brody Hutzler
- Distributed by: The Asylum
- Release date: July 7, 2015
- Running time: 90 minutes
- Country: United States
- Language: English

Mega Shark Versus Kolossus (also known as Mega Shark vs. Kolossus) is a 2015 science fiction film starring Illeana Douglas, Amy Rider and Brody Hutzler.

The film is a sequel to Mega Shark Versus Mecha Shark (2014) and is the fourth installment in the Mega Shark film series.

== Plot ==
Following the events of the previous film, another shark is awakened by Russian miners drilling underwater in search of red mercury. The ships Unicorn 1 and Unicorn 2 intercept MegaShark, whose presence poses a threat to the Brazilian coastline. Both vessels launch a coordinated assault using oxygen-destroying missiles capable of causing the molecular disintegration of oxygen across an extensive oceanic region. The scale of this phenomenon threatens to extend its effects toward the Brazilian coastline, endangering its coastal areas.

Despite the attack, MegaShark survives and retaliates by launching one of the Unicorn ships directly into the Christ the Redeemer statue, completely destroying it upon impact.

Meanwhile, the second ship manages to cling to the shark and activates its self-destruct mechanism, concentrating all its energy alongside the remaining oxygen-destroying missiles. The resulting detonation generates a gigantic column of vapor and a powerful shockwave that violently spreads across the ocean. Particularly noteworthy is that this disturbance reaches the Brazilian coastline, causing coastal damage and significantly disrupting the surrounding waters.

As the enormous vapor cloud gradually dissipates, MegaShark emerges from the epicenter completely unharmed, having endured both the missile assault and the Unicorn ship's self-destruction.

Benedict leads a team of prospectors into a mine in Russia and discover a secret stock of red mercury. During a stand off between American agent Moira King and the Russians, a giant robot called Kolossus reawakens and destroys the mine as King escapes.

Dr. Alison Gray proposes a newly developed sonic transmitter to the military, which is rejected in favor of a more aggressive plan laid out by her colleague Dr. John Bullock. Tech mogul and environmentalist Joshua Dane, CEO of DaneTech Industries, intercepts government communications about these plans and summons Dr. Gray. The Shark is revealed to be an important part of the planet's ecosystem and Dane suggests working together to humanely stop the shark protect the environment.

King recruits Spencer to assist her in stopping Kolossus, a mobile weapon of mass destruction created by the Soviets during the Cold War, powered by red mercury.

During a failed attack on the shark by a fleet led by Admiral Jackson, Bullock is thrown overboard. Dane and Alison arrive by hydrofoil and deploy Alison's transmitter which failsm allowing the shark to escape. King and Spencer join forces with Dane and Alison and find Kolossus' creator, Sergei Abramov, who tells them where the technology to control Kolossus can be found. Kolossus intervenes and kills Abramov while the others escape.

The group locates the submerged laboratory where Abramov created Kolossus. As the shark's rampage continues, Admiral Jackson suffers a breakdown and initiates a nuclear launch before committing suicide. Lieutenant Commander Parker overrides the order and King lures the shark into the laboratory, trapping it. Kolossus appears and begins fighting with the shark. The group locate the device and escape the lab just before the battle crushes it. Kolossus approaches Dane's ship, but they connect the controller to Dane's computer system in time to stop it.

With Kolossus now under control, Dane betrays the others, revealing he was Benedict's sponsor and sabotaged Alison's transmitter to prevent the government from killing the shark before he could find red mercury. As he collects the red mercury from Kolossus, the shark attacks again, but he uses Kolossus to attach a transmitter to it, bringing the shark under his control as well. Dane broadcasts a message worldwide, announcing that he has control of both Mega Shark and Kolossus and plans to use Kolossus to destroy the cities that produce the most pollution, killing millions in the name of saving the environment. Several governments scramble fighter jets against him, but Dane uses Mega Shark and Kolossus to eliminate them. He then declares to the world that he expects a nuclear strike will come, warning that if he is killed, it will trigger the release of red mercury into the atmosphere, rendering Earth inhospitable for centuries. The US activates the Strategic Defense Initiative satellite, prompting Dane to have Kolossus throw the shark into space, knocking the satellite's laser off target so it hits the moon instead, cutting it on a large scale. Dane does not notice that when the shark lands back in the ocean, the transmitter falls off. The shark attacks Kolossus, causing Dane's control system to crash. Kolossus targets the ship; while Alison, King and Spencer - who escaped their bonds earlier - flee, Dane runs onto the beach and is crushed under Kolossus' foot.

Alison, King and Spencer watch from the shore as Mega Shark and Kolossus engage in a vicious final battle. Kolossus finally drags the shark down, wraps around it and detonates its entire remaining supply of red mercury, transforming into a plasma body that absorbed the shark, destroying both creatures. With the crisis over, the three survivors await rescue. Deep underwater, another egg hatches, giving birth to a new Mega Shark. In a post-credits scene, Dr. Bullock is killed by the new shark.

== Cast ==
- Illeana Douglas as Dr. Alison Gray
- Amy Rider as Moira King
- Brody Hutzler as Joshua Dane
- Edward DeRuiter as Spencer
- Ernest Lee Thomas as Admiral Titus Jackson
- Tara Price as Lieutenant Commander Elisha Parker
- Jeff Hatch as Dr. John Bullock
- Bryan Hanna as Benedict
- Patrick Bauchau as Sergei Abramov
- Rileah Vanderbilt as Rileah
- Tim Abell as Ivan
