= Early life of Pope John Paul II =

The early life of Karol Józef Wojtyła, the future Pope John Paul II, covers the period in his life from his birth in 1920 to his ordination to the priesthood in 1946.

== Childhood ==
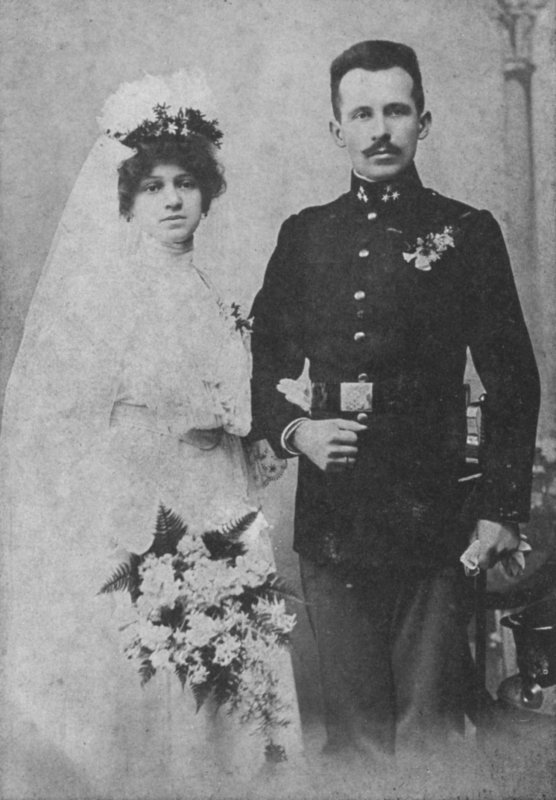
The wedding portrait of Wojtyła's parents.

Karol Józef Wojtyła (jr) was born on 18 May 1920 in Wadowice near the city of Kraków in southern Poland, the youngest of three children.

His father was Karol Józef Wojtyła (senior), born on 18 July 1879 in Lipnik (now part of Bielsko-Biała). He was a non-commissioned officer of the Austro-Hungarian Army and a captain in the Polish Army. Wojtyła (senior) died, from what is believed to be a heart attack, on 18 February 1941 (Kraków, Poland) while his son was away, and the fact is considered to have influenced his son's decision to join the seminary. Wojtyła's (senior) parents were Anna (Przeczek) and Maciej Wojtyła.

His mother was Emilia Wojtyła, née Kaczorowska. She was born on 26 March 1884 in Kraków. Her parents were Anna Maria (Scholz) and Feliks Kaczorowski. Her name would later be given to a road tunnel built in Silesia, in March 2010 (Tunnel Emilia). She died of heart and kidney problems on 13 April 1929 in Wadowice, Poland. His only sister, Olga, died in infancy before Karol was born.

After Emilia's death, his father, an intensely religious man who did most of the housework, brought up Karol so that he could study. As a child Karol was called Lolek by friends and family. He grew close to his brother Edmund, whom Karol had nicknamed Mundek. Edmund graduated from the Jagiellonian University in Kraków and practised as a doctor in Bielsko. There was an epidemic of scarlet fever in the winter of 1932, and he contracted the disease from one of his patients. Edmund died four days later, on 5 December, aged 26; Karol, now 12, was profoundly affected. He reflected on this fifty years later, in a speech he made at the Jagiellonian University: "These are events that became deeply engraved in my memory, my brother's death perhaps even deeper than my mother's death—equally because of the special circumstances, one may say tragic ones, and in view of my greater maturity at the time." On Thursday, 10 October 2019, the Polish Episcopal Conference formally announced that they would petition the Holy See for permission to begin the cause for beatification and canonization of Karol Sr. and Emilia at the local level, in the Archdiocese of Kraków. If the Pope, through the Cardinal Prefect and the voting cardinal and bishop members of the Congregation for the Causes of the Saints, agrees, the couple would be named Servants of God, the first stage. If they are then found to have lived a life of heroic virtue, they can be called Venerable. After that, a miracle, usually medical in nature, must be proven for them to be beatified, and then another for canonization, unless a requirement is waived by the Pope.

Karol's youth was influenced by numerous contacts with the vibrant and prospering Jewish community of Wadowice. He often played football, as a goalkeeper, and was a supporter of Polish club Cracovia and Spanish club FC Barcelona. School football games were often organised between teams of Jews and Catholics, and due to the anti-Jewish feelings of the time, there was a potential for events to sometimes turn "nasty". Karol, however, cheerfully offered himself as a substitute goalkeeper on the Jewish side if they were short of players.

It was around this time that the young Karol had his first serious relationship with a girl. He became close to a girl called Ginka Beer, described as "a Jewish beauty, with stupendous eyes and jet black hair, slender, a superb actress."

In high school, he joined and soon became president of The Society of Mary (a lay society, not to be confused with the Marianists).

Papal biographer George Weigel recalls that when Karol was around 15 years old, a young person playfully pointed a gun at him not realising that it was loaded. On pressing the trigger, the gun fired and narrowly missed the target. He would escape from other near-death incidents as a young seminarian and later as Pope.

== University ==
After completing his studies at the Marcin Wadowita high school in Wadowice, in the summer of 1938 Karol Wojtyła and his father left Wadowice and moved to Kraków, where he enrolled at Jagiellonian University in the autumn semester. In his first year, Wojtyła studied philosophy, Polish language and literature, introductory Russian, and Old Church Slavonic. He also took private lessons in French. He worked as a volunteer librarian and did compulsory military training in the Academic Legion, but refused to hold or fire a weapon. At the end of the 1938–39 academic year, he played Sagittarius in a fantasy-fable, The Moonlight Cavalier, produced by an experimental theatre troupe.

In his youth he was an athlete, actor and playwright, and learned as many as twelve languages. By the time he was Pope he spoke nine languages fluently: Polish (native language), Latin, Ancient Greek, Italian, French, German, English, Spanish and Portuguese.

== The Second World War ==
In September 1939, Germany invaded Poland, and the country was subsequently occupied by German and Soviet forces. At the outbreak of War, Karol and his father fled eastwards from Kraków with thousands of other Poles. They sometimes found themselves in ditches, taking cover from strafing Luftwaffe aircraft. After walking 120 miles, they learned of the Soviet invasion of Poland and were obliged to return to Kraków. In November, 184 academics of the Jagiellonian University were arrested and the university suppressed. All able-bodied males had to have a job.

In the first year of the war Karol worked as a messenger for a restaurant. This light work enabled him to continue his education and theatrical career, and acts of cultural resistance. He also intensified his study of French. From the autumn of 1940 Karol worked for almost four years as a manual labourer in a limestone quarry, and was well paid. His father died in 1941 of a heart attack. In 1942, he entered the underground seminary run by Cardinal Sapieha, the archbishop of Kraków. B'nai B'rith and other authorities have testified that he helped Jews find refuge from the Nazis.

On 29 February 1944, Karol was walking home from work at the quarry when he was knocked down by a German truck. The German officers tending the injured Wojtyła, and the decision to commandeer a passing truck for use as an ambulance for the unconscious patient, is in sharp contrast to the harshness normally expected from occupying forces during this period. He spent two weeks hospitalized, having suffered a severe concussion, numerous cuts and a shoulder injury. This accident and his survival seemed to Wojtyła a confirmation of his priestly vocation. In August 1944, the Warsaw uprising began and the Gestapo swept the city of Kraków on 6 August, "Black Sunday", rounding up young men to avoid a similar uprising there. Wojtyła escaped by hiding behind a door as the Gestapo searched the house he lived in, and fled to the Archbishop's residence, where he stayed until after the war.

On the night of 17 January 1945, the Germans abandoned the city without a fight. The seminarians reclaimed the old seminary, which was in ruins. Wojtyła and another seminarian volunteered for the odious task of chopping up and carting away piles of frozen excrement from the lavatories. In the same month of that year, Wojtyła personally helped a 14-year-old Jewish refugee girl named Edith Zierer who had run away from a Nazi labour camp in Częstochowa. Zierer was attempting to reach her family in Kraków but had collapsed from cold and exhaustion on a train platform in Jędrzejów. No one helped but Wojtyła, who approached her. Wojtyła gave Zierer some hot tea and food, personally carried her to a train and accompanied her to Kraków. Zierer credits Wojtyła with saving her life that day. In the chaos of post-war Poland they became separated and Zierer would not hear of her benefactor again until she read that he was elected Pope in 1978.
