= Alexander Yellen =

American cinematographer (born 1981)

- Born: Alexander Brooks Yellen; January 26, 1981 (age 45); Washington, DC, U.S
- Education: St. Albans School
- Alma mater: Wesleyan University (BA)
- Occupation: Cinematographer
- Years active: 2003–present

Alexander Yellen (born January 26, 1981) is an American cinematographer, who is best known for his work on the Syfy zombie series Z Nation. He is also known for his work on giant monster and disaster movies such as Mega Shark Versus Giant Octopus and Titanic II, with the former earning praise for Yellen's photography.

== Early life ==
Born in Washington D.C. to archaeologist John Yellen and anthropology professor Alison S. Brooks, Alexander Yellen attended St. Albans School in Washington, D.C., graduating in 1999. He studied film at Wesleyan University where he received a B.A. in 2003.

== Career ==
After college, Yellen moved to Los Angeles. To learn the craft of cinematography, he began working as a camera assistant on a number of student films at the American Film Institute. While building his career and having joined the International Cinematographers Guild as a camera assistant, Yellen had the opportunity to shoot second unit footage under Eric Steelberg, ASC on Quinceañera. Quinceañera won the Grand Jury Prize and the Audience Award at the 2006 Sundance Film Festival. This helped Yellen secure a job shooting films for The Asylum. The number of feature films for which he has served as Director of Photography (DP) now totals 72, including the cult classic Mega Shark Versus Giant Octopus. He has been DP on 44 feature films as well as numerous commercials and other content. Yellen also shot the film Born Bad for the Lifetime (TV network) and the independent high school comedy Sports Heaven.

Yellen has directed eight episodes of Z Nation, at one time Syfy's highest rated show.

His most recent work includes Circus Kane and I'll be Watching.

Participating in the Race Across America as a crew chief for Team Beaver Creek, Yellen and his team won the race in 2006 and 2007.
