= Mega Shark Versus Mecha Shark =

- DVD cover
- Directed by: Emile Edwin Smith
- Written by: Jose Prendes; H. Perry Horton
- Screenplay by: Jose Prendes
- Produced by: David Michael Latt
- Starring: Christopher Judge; Elisabeth Röhm; Debbie Gibson
- Cinematography: Alexander Yellen
- Edited by: Rob Pallatina
- Music by: Isaac Sprintis
- Production company: The Asylum
- Distributed by: The Asylum
- Release date: January 28, 2014
- Running time: 85 minutes
- Country: United States
- Language: English

Mega Shark Versus Mecha Shark is a 2014 direct-to-video monster/disaster film produced by the Asylum. It was released on DVD and Blu-ray Disc on January 28, 2014. The film is a sequel to Mega Shark Versus Giant Octopus and Mega Shark Versus Crocosaurus, and is the third installment in the Mega Shark film series. It is the directorial debut of Emile Edwin Smith and stars Christopher Judge and Elisabeth Röhm, with Debbie Gibson reprising her role as Emma MacNeil from the first film.

== Plot ==
A tugboat pulling a huge iceberg arrives at a port in Alexandria, Egypt, when suddenly, the iceberg shatters and releases a megalodon from suspended animation. The Mega Shark begins its reign of terror by flipping the tugboat to the air until it crashes and decapitates the Sphinx hundreds of miles away in Giza. Following the incident, several countries around the world place their ports on lockdown and impose a ban on fishing, adversely affecting the world's economy as the megalodon terrorizes the seas. Meanwhile, rumors surface of the United Nations' proposal to develop a weapon to combat the shark.

At Pearl Harbor, Jack Turner and Rosie Gray are assigned to pilot the Mecha Shark, a new prototype submarine that resembles the megalodon. Jack, however, is skeptical about the untested prototype, as it is not equipped with their special A.I. named "Nero". Later, aboard the USS Charles Davis, Admiral Engleberg is warned by Dr. Emma McNeil that the megalodon's aggression attributes to its search for a mate. After the USS Virginia confirms the presence of the megalodon within the South China Sea, the Charles Davis and the Mecha Shark head to rendezvous with the Virginia. Rosie takes the Mecha Shark and hits the mega shark with a tracking projectile. The Virginia fires a torpedo that hits the shark. Rosie launches a torpedo toward the megalodon, but she inadvertently sinks the Virginia before the mega shark damages the prototype. Following the failed operation, Jack installs Nero into the Mecha Shark's computer. Meanwhile, the megalodon strikes the AR Event Horizon oil platform off the coast of Australia, triggering a devastating oil spill.

Rosie takes the Mecha Shark back underwater as she and Nero duke it out with the megalodon, but they discover a damaged oil pipeline in the area. Jack and Adm. Engleberg engage in a heated argument over the decision to either seal the pipeline or continue the pursuit on the mega shark. Rosie uses the Mecha Shark to seal the leak by crushing the damaged pipe before continuing her objective. The megalodon launches itself into the air to sink a commercial airliner, but the Mecha Shark rushes in to tackle it mid-air back into the ocean. In the ensuing battle, the tracking projectile falls off the megalodon's body. Rosie fires a torpedo toward the mega shark, but it uses its tail fin to swat it toward the Charles Davis' fleet, sinking one of the ships. The Mecha Shark follows the megalodon into a trench; Rosie fires another torpedo that causes a landslide that sends the submarine offline and knocks Rosie unconscious. A few minutes later, Nero's system reboots and notifies Jack that the Mecha Shark is wedged between several rocks, but it manages to blast its way out of the debris with a nuclear explosion generated from its reactor. The megalodon attacks the USS James Stewart aircraft carrier, which is field-testing her high-frequency emitters. Jack and Adm. Engleberg tell the James Stewart crew to turn off her emitters; the attack is briefly halted, but the megalodon jumps to intercept a fighter plane and crushes the carrier in the process.

After the Mecha Shark returns to the Charles Davis, Jack and Adm. Engleberg argue over putting an unconscious Rosie back in the field when Nero suggests it can control the submarine by itself. Mecha Shark returns to sea, but it is critically damaged by the megalodon. After Rosie awakens, she is summoned to Emma's research facility in Auckland, New Zealand, where Emma reveals that the megalodon is headed toward Sydney, a spawning ground of its species millions of years earlier. Sydney is promptly evacuated while Nero goes back online, yet Jack cannot pinpoint the glitch that caused its defeat. As predicted, the megalodon arrives in Sydney's shores; the Mecha Shark with Nero in control is once again deployed to engage it in battle, managing to fire an electric beam through the eel's skin and momentarily scaring them away. Nero once again malfunctions; this time, the Mecha Shark enters Drone Mode, a fail-safe system programmed to complete its task without the safety protocols. The megalodon tackles Mecha Shark and hurls it toward the Sydney Opera House. Jack rushes to Sydney and reunites with Rosie, but Mecha Shark goes back online and determines all humans in sight as hostile after soldiers point their guns at it. As the Mecha Shark goes into amphibious mode and terrorizes the streets, Emma calls Rosie and suggests to lure it back into the ocean and convince the megalodon to destroy it. Rosie rushes in to board the Mecha Shark to trigger the pulse generator. Meanwhile, the megalodon sinks the Charles Davis, killing Adm. Engleberg and everyone aboard. The Mecha Shark is blasted back into the water by a squadron of fighter planes. Jack boards a second shark submarine to board the Mecha Shark and get Nero back online. Jack and Rosie leave the Mecha Shark before the megalodon bites the left side of the submarine, activating a missile that, upon exploding, merges with the pulse generator, eel skin, and the nuclear reactor, destroying both combatants.

Jack reveals to Rosie that he copied Nero's system into a flash drive before telling her they have some explaining to do to the Australian authorities.

== Cast ==
- Christopher Judge as Jack Turner
- Elisabeth Röhm as Rosie Gray
- Debbie Gibson as Emma MacNeil
- Paul B. Anderson as Nero (voice)
- Beejan Land as Roy
- Matt Lagan as Admiral Engleberg
- Kate Avery as Sergeant Brooks
- Hannah Levien as Sandy
- Steve Hanks as Captain Reynolds
- Emma Rose Maloney as Stacey
- Lance Buckner as Captain Zane
- Sylvia Panacione as Italian Reporter

== Production ==
When the Los Angeles production company the Asylum was about to release Sharknado in mid-2013, screenwriter Jose Prendes was approached by producers from the company to write a Mega Shark film where the Mega Shark has to fight a Mecha Shark. Prendes, who previously directed the film The Haunting of Whaley House in 2012 for the Asylum, was hesitant at first, due to Prendes not being a fan of the previous two films and the "stigma attached to these kind of movies." After Sharknado was released and became a success, Prendes then agreed to write the Mega Shark film.

Instead of being given an outline, Prendes was asked to provide an outline himself for the film. His personal objective was to make the film work organically, even if the premise was ludicrous. Prendes researched on the extinct megalodon's mating and feeding habits to help him in writing the screenplay. One of the early notes given to him by producers was that he include a scene of the Mega Shark destroying the Sphinx at the beginning of the film. Prendes incorporated the idea at their insistence, but tweaked it so that the Mega Shark instead knocks a tugboat out of the harbor in Alexandria to hit the Sphinx.

Prendes wrote the first draft of the film's screenplay in four days. Although the Asylum is known for low-budget "mockbusters", the company places great importance in its scripts; Prendes made a total of nine drafts of the screenplay in two months due to the many notes given to him by producers.

When filming was about to begin, Prendes advised director Emile Smith to be flexible with the script. Extra scenes were shot to add to the film's running time. According to Prendes, principal photography lasted 15 days, along with two additional days for reshoots. Many of the ideas Prendes had which were cut from the film were eventually included in his book Sharcano.

== Release ==
=== Marketing ===
A trailer for Mega Shark Versus Mecha Shark was released by the Asylum on December 6, 2013 through YouTube.

=== Home media ===
The film was released on Blu-ray on January 28, 2014. The Blu-ray release includes an audio commentary by director Emile Smith, writer Jose Prendes, and actor Christopher Judge, a six-minute "Making Of" featurette, a gag reel, and previews of other films by the Asylum.

== Reception ==
=== Critical response ===
Dread Central gave the film two out of five "knives", commenting that "It must be a testimony to the level of schlock The Asylum has been churning out over the years that I can watch a movie called Mega Shark vs. Mecha Shark and come away underwhelmed due to a prevailing sense that it's just going through the motions."

== Sequel ==
Despite earlier claims by the Asylum that Mega Shark Versus Mecha Shark would be the final film of the series, a fourth installment titled Mega Shark Versus Kolossus was released on July 7, 2015. The film features a new Mega Shark facing off against a giant robot named Kolossus awakened by Russian energy excavation. The Kolossus is heavily based on the "Colossal Titan" character featured in the manga and anime franchise Attack on Titan, while incorporating elements of the Armada Suits featured in the Asylum's earlier film Atlantic Rim.

== See also ==
- List of killer shark films
