= Mega Shark Versus Crocosaurus =

- DVD cover
- Directed by: Christopher Douglas-Olen Ray
- Written by: Micho Rutare; Naomi Selfman (Screenplay)
- Produced by: David Michael Latt; David Rimawi (Executive producer); Paul Bales (co-producer)
- Starring: Jaleel White; Gary Stretch; Sarah Lieving; Robert Picardo; Hannah Cowley; Dylan Vox
- Cinematography: Alexander Yellen
- Edited by: Jose Montesinos
- Music by: Chris Ridenhour
- Distributed by: The Asylum
- Release date: December 21, 2010
- Running time: 90 minutes
- Country: United States
- Language: English
- Budget: $100,000
- Box office: $500,543

Mega Shark Versus Crocosaurus is a 2010 disaster horror film by The Asylum, released on December 21, 2010, in the United States. The film stars Jaleel White, Gary Stretch, Robert Picardo, Dylan Vox, Hannah Cowley and Sarah Lieving.

The film is a sequel to the 2009 film Mega Shark Versus Giant Octopus and is the second installment in the Mega Shark film series, but contains little of the original cast from that film.

== Plot ==
Deep in the Democratic Republic of the Congo, an illegal diamond mining operation awakens a giant prehistoric crocodile of 1,500 feet (460m). Meanwhile, on the Atlantic Ocean, the US Navy warship USS Gibson is attacked and sunk by the megalodon that ended up surviving suffocation by the octopus in the first film. Lt. Terry McCormick who was experimenting with a sonic shark-repelling device, is the sole survivor of the attack. Back in DR Congo, an English hunter named Nigel Putnam is hired by a representative of the mining company, the rich businesswoman Legatt, they travel to the site of the attack, however the crocodile devours Legatt whole but he successfully captures the giant crocodile when it attempts to eat him, but he injects his tranquilizer darts into its mouth. He then has the crocodile delivered to a shipping yard for his friends to load it on a cargo ship.

In Los Angeles, California, McCormick is being interrogated by the National Oceanic and Atmospheric Administration Special Agent Hutchinson for the USS Gibson incident. He feels responsible for the sinking, suggesting that his sonic device lured in the megalodon. Because of this, he offers to help Hutchinson hunt down the megalodon with his invention. Meanwhile, a cargo ship is carrying the tranquilized crocodile on the Atlantic Ocean 400 miles south of Florida. It is revealed that the ship is also carrying the crocodile's eggs. Then, without warning, the ship is attacked by the megalodon, waking up the crocodile from its sleep. Putnam and his partner Jean jump overboard before the ship is destroyed in the ensuing battle.

Aboard the aircraft carrier USS Lexington, McCormick is introduced to Admiral Calvin, who informs him that his elite crew has only one objective: to hunt down and destroy the megalodon. McCormick is given a room aboard the carrier, and the most advanced tracking equipment. Hutchinson is sent to a remote island to meet and interrogate Putnam, who had just washed up ashore following the cargo ship incident. Hutchinson is shocked when Putnam informs her of the crocodile he captured, as her team was only aware of the megalodon. She then has him handcuffed and brought back to the carrier. Once there, the crew discover the appearance of eggs on another island. Adm. Calvin assigns McCormick to accompany Hutchinson and Putnam and capture an egg. Upon arriving on the island, they discover that the eggs are laid by the shoreline and are about to hatch. When the fin of the megalodon is seen nearby, Hutchinson orders the Lexington to launch a missile strike on the island. As the team leaves the island, the megalodon swallows the eggs, angering the crocodile, while a squadron of F-18 Hornets fire their missiles at a cave holding more eggs. As the crocodile invades Miami and heads toward Orlando, McCormick suggests using an arc flash powered by the nearby Turkey Point Nuclear Generating Station to ward it off. The gamble works, as the rays of the electric nuclear arc strike the Crocosaurus until it explodes off-camera, causing it to return to the sea.

Back aboard the Lexington, Putnam suggests dissecting a crocodile egg to find its vulnerable factors; the team is informed that one egg is aboard the submarine USNS Invincible and two are being transported by Black Hawk helicopters. They also discover that the megalodon is attracted to the eggs, as it has devoured the Invincible and the Black Hawks transporting them. As no cage or trap is big enough to capture both creatures, Putnam suggests luring both the megalodon and crocodile into the Panama Canal, much to McCormick's disapproval. The submarine USS Argonaut is sent to the wreckage of the cargo ship to retrieve some crocodile eggs. The retrieval mission is a success, and the eggs are dropped into the Panama Canal. Instinctively, both the megalodon and the crocodile arrive at the canal, where they battle each other while being attacked by the Navy. The fight causes a tidal wave that destroys the entire Panama Canal as both creatures continue to bite each other.

It turns out that the crocodile has adapted itself to lay more eggs during the time the megalodon devoured the earlier batches. Hundreds more eggs have been laid all over the American coastline and are hatching. While crocodile hatchlings are attacking the Santa Monica pier, the nuclear submarine USS Carter is in pursuit of the two giant creatures, which are heading towards Hawaii. The Carter fires a nuclear torpedo at the creatures but misses, and is swallowed by the megalodon. This makes the megalodon an even greater threat, as it now has a nuclear reactor inside it that powers it up in its fight against Crocosaurus and her offspring, surpassing her in attacks. As the crocodile invades Hawaii, it causes the helicopter carrying McCormick, Putnam and Hutchinson to crash. With Hutchinson unconscious, McCormick and Putnam leave her and take a raft to drop McCormick's sonic emitter in the sea as part of their new plan: to lure all the creatures together near an undersea volcanic range. The sonic emitter lures the adults, who fight each other, and the crocodile hatchlings come to assist their mother. McCormick and Putnam are then picked up by Hutchinson, who has recovered and reactivated her helicopter.

The volcano erupts and destroys all of Hawaii, and at the same time it merges with the nuclear reactor that was powering the shark. Both creatures take the full force of the explosion and causing a large-scale earthquake, killing them along with the offspring. The trio fly home while the crocodile and shark, now completely charred and still latched on to one another, sink into the volcano.

After the credits, Nigel meets up with Jean on a beach and mentions a giant lizard in Japan. He asks him if he's up for it, and his partner says, "On one condition - no more boats." They shake hands and head off on another adventure.

== Cast ==
- Jaleel White as Lieutenant Terry McCormick, member of the US Navy
- Gary Stretch as Nigel Putnam, a bountyhunter
- Sarah Lieving as FBI Special Agent Hutchinson
- Robert Picardo as Admiral Calvin, commander of the US Navy
- Gerald Webb as Jean
- Dylan Vox as Chief Warrant Officer Butowski
- Hannah Cowley as Legatt, rich businesswoman who hires Putnam to take out the Crocosaurus
- Michael Gaglio as Captain Smalls
- Jessica Irvine as USS Omaha Captain
- Steve Mason as Investigator
- Neil Watson as an Investigator II
- Robert R. Shafer as Charlie Ross
- Darin Cooper as Commander Vail
- Luke Noll as Hobo Rogers McFreely
- Joey David Garcia as Teenager
- Claire Scott as Teenager
- Clem Hansen as Teenager
- Sean Gillaspie as a Background Actor

== Production ==
=== Connections with other Asylum titles ===
The film makes numerous references to Mega Shark Versus Giant Octopus, such as an autographed photo of singer/songwriter/actress Debbie Gibson and the Japanese poster of the first film. In addition, scenes of people panicking are taken from the film Megafault.

The Mega Shark and Crocosaurus later appeared in the crossover film 2025 Armageddon.

== Release ==
=== Marketing ===
To promote the film, The Asylum participated in a competition to make the next Doritos commercial for Super Bowl XLV. In the commercial, the megalodon attacks a naval fleet while Capt. Smalls (Michael Gaglio) asks if anything will satisfy its hunger. Then he hears a crunch and sees the janitor eating a bag of Doritos. In the next scene, a helicopter carries a giant Dorito chip over the ocean. The megalodon jumps and eats the chip before fleeing from the scene as the whole crew celebrate.

== Reception ==
=== Critical response ===
Dread Central gave the film a scathing review, giving it a score of "1 Megacraposaurus" out of 5. The review commented that "movies like this always tread a fine line between anything-goes fun and merely insulting your intelligence, and this time The Asylum may have finally jumped the mega shark." Felix Vasquez, Jr. of Cinema Crazed gave the film one star, calling it "a tedious and horrific mess that at least gives audiences what it wants: A big croc eating people, a big shark eating people, and two gargantuan stock CGI animals battling it out for the fate of Earth. Or something."

== Sequels ==
On March 24, 2012, Dread Central reported that The Asylum was developing a second sequel featuring the titular Mega Shark, titled Mega Shark Versus Mecha Shark. The announcement came after the company realized the growing popularity of the character, including an online petition for a third chapter in the series.

Mega Shark Versus Mecha Shark was released on January 28, 2014, with Debbie Gibson reprising her role as Emma MacNeil from the first film.

Despite earlier claims by the Asylum that Mega Shark Versus Mecha Shark would be the final film of the series, a fourth installment titled Mega Shark Versus Kolossus was released on July 7, 2015. The film features a new Mega Shark facing off against a giant robot named Kolossus awakened by Russian energy excavation. The Kolossus is heavily based on the "Colossal Titan" character featured in the manga and anime franchise Attack on Titan, while incorporating elements of the Armada Suits featured in the Asylum's earlier film Atlantic Rim.

== See also ==
- List of killer crocodile films
- List of killer shark films
