= Mega Shark Versus Giant Octopus =

- DVD cover
- Directed by: Jack Perez (as Ace Hannah)
- Written by: Jack Perez (as Ace Hannah)
- Produced by: David Michael Latt; David Rimawi; Paul Bales
- Starring: Deborah Gibson; Lorenzo Lamas; Mark Hengst; Sean Lawlor; Russ Kingston; Stephen Blackehart
- Cinematography: Alexander Yellen
- Edited by: Marq Morrison
- Music by: Chris Ridenhour
- Distributed by: The Asylum
- Release dates: May 19, 2009 (US); August 7, 2009 (UK)
- Running time: 90 minutes
- Countries: United States; United Kingdom
- Language: English

Mega Shark Versus Giant Octopus is a 2009 American-British monster disaster film distributed by The Asylum, released on May 19, 2009, in the United States and on August 7, 2009, in the United Kingdom. It was directed by Ace Hannah and stars singer Deborah Gibson and actor Lorenzo Lamas. The film is about the hunt for two prehistoric sea-monsters causing mayhem and carnage at sea, and is the first installment in the Mega Shark film series.

== Plot ==
Off the coast of Alaska, oceanographer Emma MacNeil is studying the migration patterns of whales aboard a stolen experimental submarine. Meanwhile, a military helicopter drops experimental sonar transmitters into the water, causing a pod of whales to go out of control and ram a nearby glacier. In the chaos, the helicopter crashes into the glacier, and the combined damage breaks the glacier open, thawing out two hibernating prehistoric creatures. MacNeil narrowly avoids the destruction. Some time later, a drilling platform off the coast of Japan is attacked by the octopus, whose tentacles are large enough to wrap around the entire structure, causing a subduction along the entire coast. After returning to Point Dume, California, MacNeil investigates the corpse of a beached whale covered with many bloody wounds. She later extracts what appears to be a shark's tooth from one of the wounds. Elsewhere, the huge shark leaps out of the ocean and attacks a commercial aircraft, forcing it to crash into the water.

MacNeil is fired from her job at the oceanographic institute for stealing the submarine. She brings the shark tooth to her old professor, former U.S. Navy pilot Lamar Sanders, who believes it belonged to a megalodon. The duo is visited by Dr. Seiji Shimada, a Japanese scientist trying to determine what attacked the drilling platform. The three review a videotape from MacNeil's submarine voyage and find images of both the megalodon and a gigantic octopus. Meanwhile, a U.S. "aval destroyer" is destroyed by the megalodon. MacNeil, Sanders, and Shimada are arrested and taken to government official Allan Baxter, who demands their help in destroying the creatures. The three agree to help, in exchange for the government agreeing to capture the creatures for study rather than destroy them.

While working to develop a lure at a naval laboratory, MacNeil and Shimada become attracted to each other and have sex in a utility closet. The incident makes them realize they can attract the creatures using chemicals. MacNeil and Sanders agree to place a trap for the shark in San Francisco Bay, while Shimada returns to Tokyo to attract the octopus. After placing the trap, MacNeil and Sanders' mini-submarine barely escapes the shark. However, the plan fails when the shark destroys another destroyer sent by Baxter. The shark resurfaces and bites off a large portion of the Golden Gate Bridge. Later, Shimada contacts the Americans and says the Japanese trap has also failed, and that the octopus has escaped. Baxter suggests using nuclear weapons against the creatures, which MacNeil, Sanders, and Shimada strongly oppose due to the risk of marine devastation, coastal damage and human casualties. MacNeil instead suggests using the same pheromone traps to create a "Thrilla in Manila" by drawing the shark and the octopus together, where they learn that both creatures can continuously evolve and become stronger. Shimada believes that the creatures must be natural rivals and their aggressiveness towards one another will cause them to fight to the death. MacNeil, Sanders, and Baxter are assigned to a submarine to find the shark and lure it to the North Pacific Ocean.

After a short search, the submarine brings both creatures to an ice trench off the Alaskan coast, where MacNeil first encountered them. Sanders himself ends up piloting the sub after the original pilot loses his nerve and pulls a gun on the captain. The shark fights off the octopus' attempts to suffocate it and attacks the submarine. MacNeil, Sanders, and Baxter man a mini-submarine and detach just as the shark bites the larger submarine in half. The shark gives chase, but the mini-sub and its crew are saved when a Japanese submarine with Shimada on board fires torpedoes at it. The octopus grabs the Japanese submarine and nearly destroys it, but the sub is released after the shark attacks the octopus. They engage in a fierce battle, ending with the shark dismembering the octopus' tentacles, causing it to bleed out, and the octopus strangling the shark to death. McNeil and the others discover that Shimada and his sub survived the octopus attack. The film ends with MacNeil, Sanders, and Shimada deciding to visit the North Sea after receiving infrared images of mysterious organic life there.

== Cast ==
- Deborah Gibson as Emma MacNeil
- Lorenzo Lamas as Allan Baxter
- Vic Chao as Seiji Shimada
- Mark Hengst as Dick Richie
- Sean Lawlor as Lamar Sanders
- Dean Kreyling as US Submarine Captain
- Stephen Blackehart as US Submarine Sonar Chief
- Larry Wang Parrish as Japanese Typhoon Captain
- Douglas N. Hachiya as Japanese Sonar Tech
- Jay Beyers as Pilot Officer
- Stefanie Gernhauser as Submarine Commander Francoise Riley
- Jonathan Nation as Vince
- Cooper Harris as US Destroyer Sonar Tech
- Dustin Harnish as US Submarine Helmsman
- Colin Broussard as Radioman

== Production ==
Efforts to convert the movie into 3D were scrapped when the studio failed to acquire adequate funding for 3-D film.

Principal photography took place over the course of twelve days in January 2009. Much of the film was shot at the AES Alamitos power station near Long Beach, California, and at Laurel Canyon Stages in Arleta. Other locations included the Long Beach pier and Leo Carillo State Beach in Malibu.

== Release ==
=== Marketing ===
The theatrical trailer released in mid-May 2009 became a viral hit, scoring over a million hits on MTV.com and another million more on YouTube upon launch, prompting brisk pre-orders of the DVD. This film is also notable as one of the very few American films to feature an Asian American male as a romantic lead as Vic Chao's character Dr. Seiji Shimada, serves as a love interest for Debbie Gibson's character, Emma MacNeil.

== Reception ==
=== Critical response ===
The film was met with mostly negative reviews, with an 19% rating on Rotten Tomatoes and an average score of 3.34/10. The consensus reads, "With shoddy FX, acting and directing. This isn't so bad it's good. It's just so bad it's terrible." Peter Whittle of The Sunday Times gave the film one out of five stars and considered it "Unwatchable, almost unreviewable, this stupid monster movie makes the Béla Lugosi swan song Plan 9 from Outer Space look like a masterpiece." Philip French of The Observer said in his review that "The risible special effects and the clumsy acting recall not Roger Corman productions but the ineptitude of Ed Wood, though the result is far less endearing." Kim Newman of Empire magazine gave it two out of five stars, calling it "Daft, plain daft. With a few daft but spectacular stunts." Scott Mendelson of The Huffington Post also gave the film two out of five stars, saying that "the actors are all appropriately terrible and the story is completely absurd."

Bill Gibron of PopMatters gave the film an 8 out of 10, saying that "Schlock may be an acquired taste, like caviar, foie gras, and Arby's, but it's hard to see how anyone wouldn't enjoy this extremely tacky dish." He also praised Gibson's performance in the film. Despite criticizing the overall film quality, Stephen of The Three Rs gave the film a 7 out of 10, calling the plane attack scene "the epitome of monster awesome."

== Sequels ==
Following the buzz generated by the release of the film's trailer, Gibson hinted on an interview that a sequel may be in the works. "Because God knows what else is in the ocean", she said. "I thought maybe a Seahorse? Maybe a 500-foot (150 m) Lobster would be good. But yes, there is the potential for a sequel, and I would absolutely love it."

In mid-2010, The Asylum updated their catalog with Mega Shark Versus Crocosaurus, which was released on December 21, 2010. The cast and director of Mega Shark Versus Giant Octopus did not return in the sequel; instead, the film was directed by Christopher Douglas-Olen Ray and featured a new cast led by Jaleel White, Gary Stretch and Robert Picardo. Originally, Mega Shark's opponent was going to be a dinosaur called Gigantosaurus as revealed in a poster for a film festival.

The Asylum released the third chapter in the series titled Mega Shark Versus Mecha Shark on January 28, 2014, with Gibson reprising her role as Emma MacNeil. The fourth Mega Shark was confirmed in February 2015 Mega Shark vs. Kolossus, had a premiere date on July 7, 2015.

== See also ==
- List of killer shark films
- List of killer octopus films
