= KulFaZ =

German television program

- Die kultigsten Filme aller Zeiten
- Genre: (iconic) movies
- Created by: Oliver Kalkofe
- Directed by: Jana König
- Presented by: Oliver Kalkofe, Peter Rütten
- Country of origin: Germany
- Original language: German
- No. of seasons: 2
- No. of episodes: 8

Original release
- Network: Tele 5
- Release: June 10, 2022

KulFaZ [coolːfat͡s] shortened from Die kultigsten Filme aller Zeiten (The most iconic films of all time) is a spin-off of the long-running German television series SchleFaZ, The worst movies of all time. In this format, screenings of iconic films are introduced by comedians Oliver Kalkofe and Peter Rütten along with a commentary, and conclude with a summary and a vote. Unlike SchleFaZ, the movies are shown at prime time on Friday evenings on Tele 5.

Since 2024 and the associated broadcast of SchleFaZ on NITRO TV, there has been a follow-up format called “Die schöne SchleFaZ Pause” (The Beautiful SchleFaZ Break).

== Airing data ==
=== Season 1 ===
No. (Sum)	Nr. (Season)	German Title	Movie / Original Name	Release	Snack / Cocktail	Airing date
1	1	Flash Gordon	Flash Gordon	1980	Drink (alcoholic): Flash-Gordons-Dry-Gin-Ming; Drink (non-alcoholic): Dino-Ohne-Vino-Laurentis-Wenn-Man-Trotzdem-Lacht-Bowle; Snack: Mongo Mango Salat	2022-06-10
2	2	La Boum - Die Fete	The Party	1980	Drink (alcoholic): First Love-French Kiss-Pastis; Drink (non-alcoholic): L'Amour pour tous toujours (Love for everyone always); Snack: La Boum-Birne und Brie-Baguette	2022-06-17
3	3	Top Secret!	Top Secret!	1984	Drink (alcoholic): Verdienter Wein des Volkes; Drink (non-alcoholic): Blaue Lagune-Bowle; Snacks (sweet): Knusperflocken (Zetti ), Halloren Kugeln, Erdnußdragees (gebrannte Erdnüsse), Schokolinsen (Piasten), Russisch Brot (VEB Elite Dauerbackwaren Dresden , alternativ Bahlsen), Schoko Puffreis (Nippon); Snacks (salty): Salzstangen , Salzbrezeln, Pumpernickeltaler (spread with cream cheese, garnished with pickles, cheese cubes, grapes or olives), Mixed Pickels, Schinkenröllchen (filled with asparagus and horseradish), Russische Eier (spread with mayonnaise and caviar), and for very brave snack professionals: Mett-Igel !	2022-06-24
4	4	Blues Brothers	The Blues Brothers	1980	Drink (alcoholic): Sweetheart To Miss-Sugar To Kiss-Fizz; Drink (non-alcoholic): Coke; Snack: Broiler on dry toast	2022-07-01

=== Season 2 ===
No. (Sum)	Nr. (Season)	German Title	Movie / Original Name	Release	Snack / Cocktail	Airing date
5	1	Bill & Teds verrückte Reise durch die Zeit	Bill & Ted's Excellent Adventure	1989	Drink; Snack	2023-06-02
6	2	Tod auf dem Nil	Death on the Nile	1978	Drink; Snack	2023-06-09
7	3	Mars Attacks!	Mars Attacks!	1996	Drink; Snack	2023-06-16
8	4	Monty Python's Der Sinn des Lebens	Monty Python's The Meaning of Life	1983	Drink; Snack	2023-06-23

=== Scoring ===
At the end of the show Oliver Olli Kalkofe and Peter Päter Rütten rate the film, and the audience can also vote online. Votes are recorded in three categories, each marked out of 10:

- Resistance / Tenability
- Cultness / Iconicness
- Fun factor

==== Flash Gordon ====
Category	Olli	Päter	Audience
Resistance	8	5	6.5
Cultness	9	6	7.3
Fun factor	7	7	7.0
Total	24	18	20.8

==== La boum ====
Category	Olli	Päter	Audience
Resistance	5	7	5.8
Cultness	7	8	6.2
Fun factor	6	7	5.5
Total	18	22	17.5

==== Top Secret! ====
Category	Olli	Päter	Audience
Resistance	8	8	0.0
Cultness	8	7	0.0
Fun factor	10	10	0.0
Total	26	25	0.0

==== Blues Brothers ====
Category	Olli	Päter	Audience
Resistance	9	8	0.0
Cultness	10	10	0.0
Fun factor	9	8	0.0
Total	28	26	0.0

==== Bill & Teds verrückte Reise durch die Zeit ====
Category	Olli	Päter	Audience
Resistance	5	6	0.0
Cultness	6	7	0.0
Fun factor	5	5	0.0
Total	16	18	0.0

==== Tod auf dem Nil ====
Category	Olli	Päter	Audience
Resistance	8	8	0.0
Cultness	8	7	0.0
Fun factor	9	6	0.0
Total	25	21	0.0

==== Mars Attacks! ====
Category	Olli	Päter	Audience
Resistance	8	9	0.0
Cultness	7	8	0.0
Fun factor	7	6	0.0
Total	22	23	0.0

==== Monty Python's Der Sinn des Lebens ====
Category	Olli	Päter	Audience
Resistance	10	9	0.0
Cultness	10	10	0.0
Fun factor	10	10	0.0
Total	30	29	0.0
