= SchleFaZ =

German television program

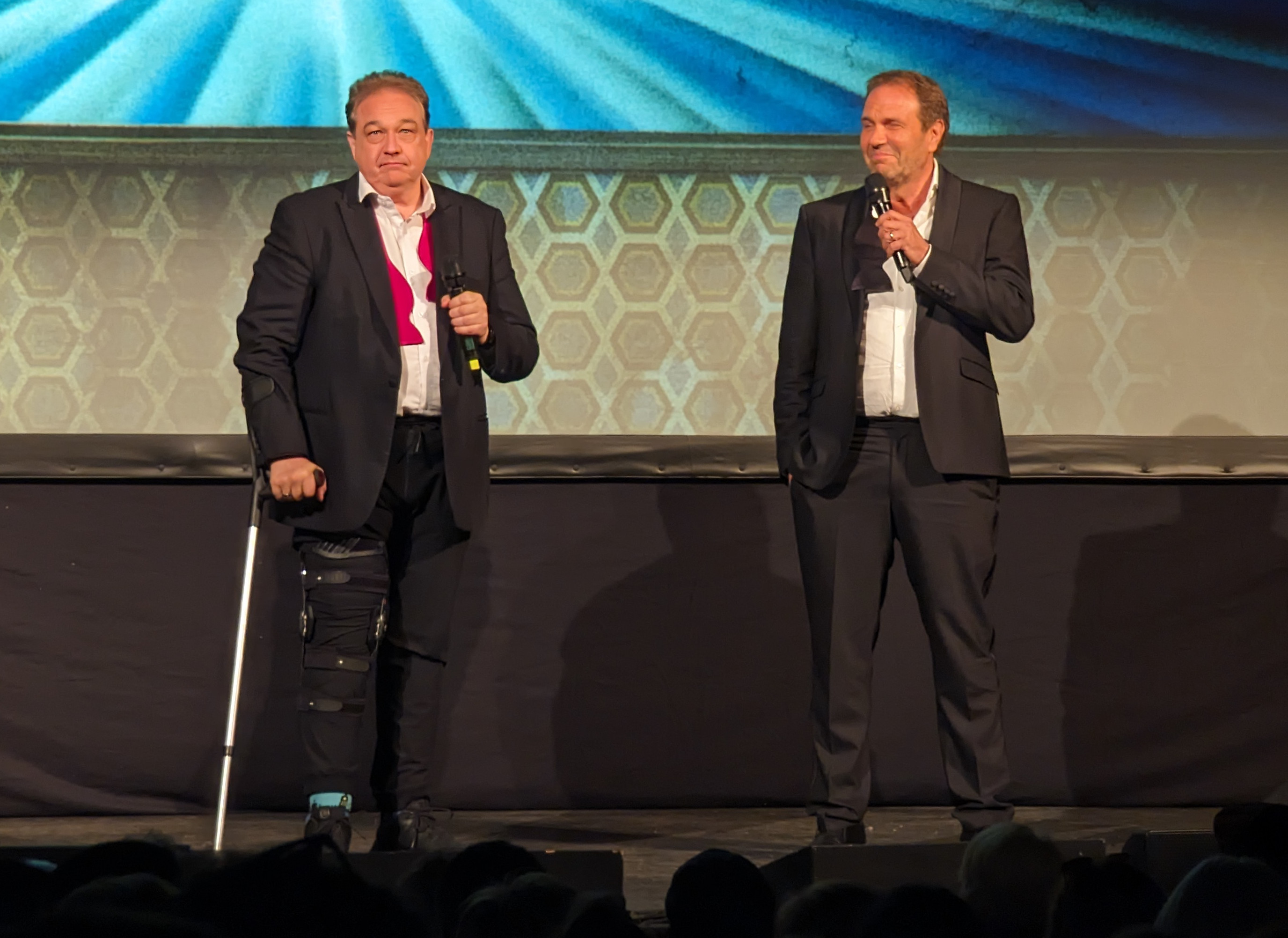
- Die schlechtesten Filme aller Zeiten
- Genre: (Bad) Movies
- Created by: Oliver Kalkofe
- Inspired by: Oliver Kalkofe, Kai Blasberg
- Written by: Oliver Kalkofe, Peter Rütten
- Screenplay by: Oliver Kalkofe, Peter Rütten
- Story by: Oliver Kalkofe, Peter Rütten
- Directed by: Sven Haeusler / Jana König
- Presented by: Oliver Kalkofe, Peter Rütten
- Starring: Oliver Kalkofe, Peter Rütten
- Theme music composer: Michael Jackson
- Opening theme: "Bad"
- Ending theme: "Bad"
- Composer: Michael Jackson
- Country of origin: Germany
- Original language: German
- No. of seasons: 11 on TELE 5, 2 on NITRO
- No. of episodes: 12 (2013 + 2014, 2022; in 2 chapters); 16 (in 3 chapters: spring, summer, winter); 10 (since 2024)

Production
- Producers: Oliver Kalkofe, Jörg Strombach
- Running time: variable
- Production company: KALK TV

Original release
- Network: TELE 5 NITRO
- Release: 26 July 2013

SchleFaZ [ˈʃleːfat͡s] (Die schlechtesten Filme aller Zeiten) ("The worst movies of all time") is a satirical film series from the German private broadcaster Tele 5 (since 2024 NITRO). In this series, mainly B-movies, which are characterized by particularly bad workmanship or unintentionally funny ideas, are introduced, commented on and presented by Oliver Kalkofe and Peter Rütten. These films themselves are called "Schlefaze".

In 2013, Kalkofe and fellow comedian Peter Rütten created and began hosting the still-running show SchleFaZ on Tele 5, which is loosely based on the format of American TV series Mystery Science Theater 3000. The name "SchleFaZ" is a pun on "GröFaZ" (Größter Feldherr aller Zeiten; roughly, "Greatest field commander of all time"; the German word Feldherr has no exact English equivalent), a derogatory nickname for Adolf Hitler. The title is also a reference to the former slogan of the German TV-Station Kabel 1, which was "Die besten Filme aller Zeiten" (The best movies of all time).

In it, Kalkofe and Rütten present trash films, introduce them with various background information, after every commercial break comment on the plot so far, and in the end summarize upon it, all within a retro-styled studio decorated in reference to the current film they are commenting on. The show has become an instant surprise hit for Tele 5, being the channel's leading show in ratings (with Kalkofe's other show Kalkofes Mattscheibe Rekalked being second), and during broadcasts of the show on Friday nights, the hashtag #schlefaz regularly enters the German Twitter top ten charts, which has prompted German TV Guides and even Tele 5 themselves to adopt the Twitter hashtag as a semi-official name for the show, also used by show hosts Kalkofe and Rütten themselves. Rütten and Kalkofe made an ironic cameo appearance in the 2015 movie Sharknado 3: Oh Hell No! and the 2017 movie Sharknado 5: Global Swarming.

Since 2021 a spin-off with the most iconic movies was announced. The series called KulFaZ started in June 2022 with four films and was continued in 2023 with four more films.

On 25 September, Tele 5 announced that it would be discontinuing the format at the end of the year. Kalkofe and Rütten hope for another broadcaster to step in.

"After eleven extremely successful years (...) it is now unfortunately time to say goodbye at the height of success. We are understandably saddened and yet grateful for the many moments of creative madness that we were able to create during this time," Kalkofe and Rütten emphasized in a joint statement. "To our wonderful fans, we promise: The fancy battleship #SchleFaZ will not sink despite everything, but will look for a new home port and continue to sail around the world of bad film live on stage. You Can't Stop the #SchleFaZ!"

After the last movie No. 164 Kalkofe and Rütten presented together with Oliver Schablitzki – Executive Vice President Multichannel from RTL Deutschland -, that the series will continue on NITRO and on Streamingplatform RTL+. The first NITRO-Season ran from 30 August till 1 November 2024.

== Start ==
Oliver Kalkofe, together with Tele-5 station manager Kai Blasberg, developed the concept for the series in 2012. Since the Tele München Gruppe owns a large number of B-movies, e.g. of the production company The Asylum, which had already been broadcast on Tele 5, the idea of presenting them as trash television – in deliberate dissociation from the concepts of other broadcasters – matured. Thus, the title of the programme stands in contrast to the Kabel One slogan "The best films of all time".

The films are presented by the presenters during the broadcast and are provided with biting comments which are then cut in between.

== Concept ==
During the programme, films are presented which, according to the presenters, are considered particularly bad and therefore deserve special attention. One film is presented per programme and is examined in more detail.

At the beginning of each episode the viewer is prepared for the film by the presenters. Information about the actors, the director and other facts about the film are presented in a humorous way. In addition, a special cocktail is created or presented for each film, whose composition or name has a reference to the film. In connection with this, a drinking game is usually introduced. For example, the audience of the film Sharknado should drink a cocktail every time a flying shark is seen. During the film, pop-ups are used to provide background information on the respective scene or to remind viewers of the drinking game. After the commercial breaks, the presenters ironically discuss particularly prominent scenes of the film. At the end of the film, what has been seen is summarized and a conclusion is given. As the seasons progress, it has become established that Kalkofe is the incorrigible enthusiast who always gives the films an artistic touch, while Rütten plays the constantly pessimistic and disinterested viewer who almost without exception finds the film bad. Yet, the curse "Fickende Hölle!" (literally "Fucking Hell!", but unidiomatic in German) has established itself as Rütten's catchphrase.

In 13 German cinemas (as of February 2014) the SchleFaZ series will be shown on the big screen simultaneously with the TV broadcast. The summer episodes of the 3rd season were simultaneously broadcast on Joiz Germany. First films of the series were released on DVD in June 2015.

After the 11th spring season Tele 5 announced the end of SchleFaZ.

=== Costumes ===
One of the mayer points of SchleFaz are the on point breaks after the ads with the costumation of Oli and Peter in the dress of the main actors/actresses.

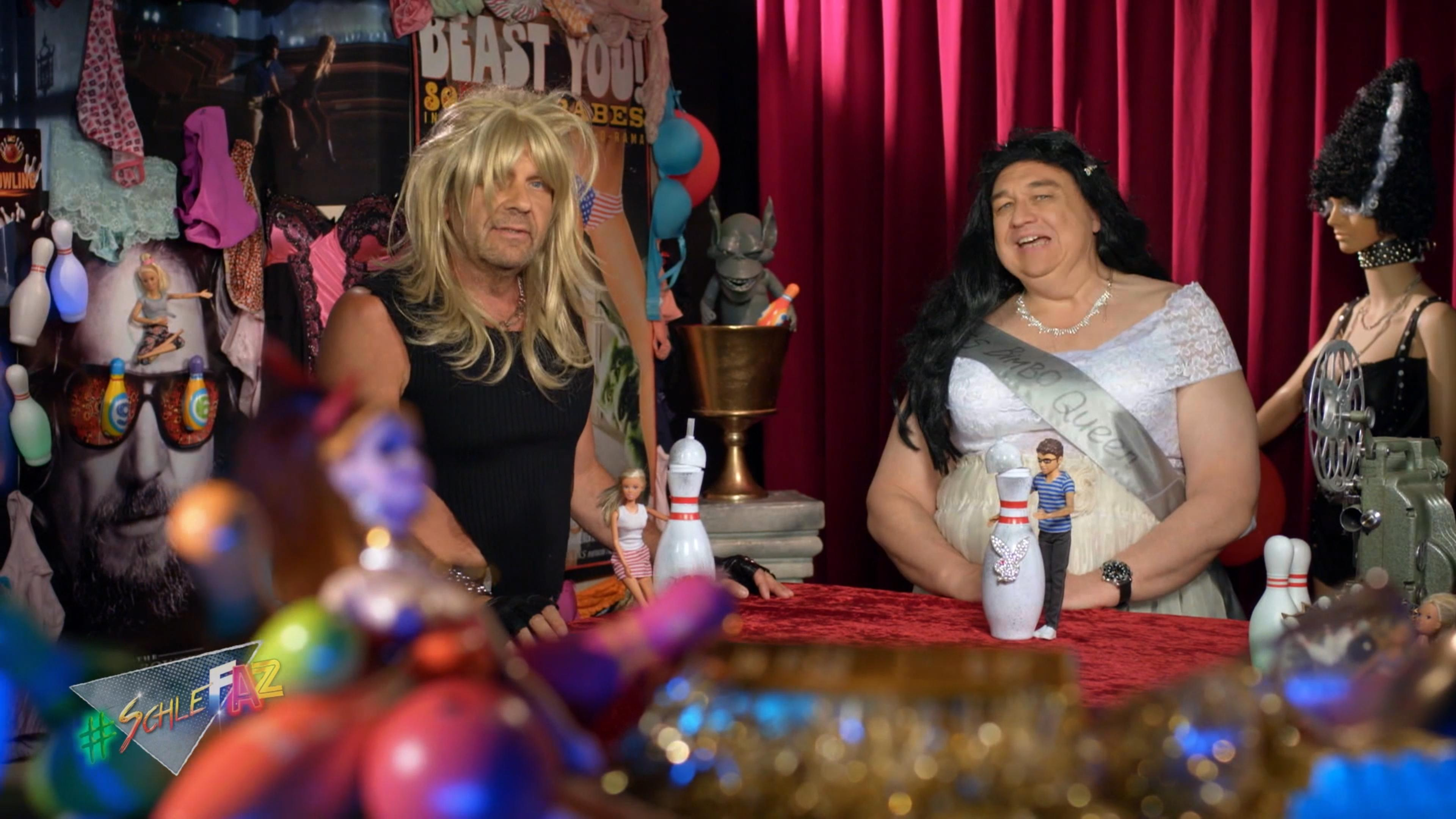

== Airing data (Tele 5) ==
Most of the Drinking Game are word plays and/or rhyme in German and therefore make little or no sense in English. So often the link goes to the disambiguation side of a word.

The Cocktail was not translated because of the word play.

=== Season 1 ===
No. (Sum)	Nr. (Season)	German Film Title (Literally translated title)	Original Movie Title [imdb link]	Release	Cocktail	Drinking Game	Airing date
1	1	Supershark	Super Shark	2011	Shark Shooter Schluckspecht (Bloody Mary @ Blue Lagoon)	every epic shark close-up	2013-07-26
2	2	Der Mann mit der Kugelpeitsche ♣ (The Man with the Bullet Whip)	Il mio nome è Shanghai Joe	1973	Chinese Mouthkick	every time, the 'yellow' (Chinese main actor) hero jumps or flies	2013-08-02
3	3	The Throne of Fire	Il trono di fuoco	1983	Onan, der Hotel Bar Barbar jeder Vernunft	At that time we did not see any good hooks. Proposal today: Whenever Princess Valkari accuses her brave protector and climber Siegfried of betraying her and wanting to kill her	2013-08-09
4	4	Piranhas II – Die Rache der Killerfische (Piranhas II – The Revenge of the Killer Fish)	Killer Fish	1979	Cai-Piranha	for each victim	2013-08-16
5	5	Cherry 2000	Cherry 2000	1987	Cherry Cherry Lady	every action scene gets us a drink	2013-08-23
6	6	Hasse deinen Nächsten (Hate your Neighbor)	Odia il prossimo tuo	1968	Shot in the Pants	–	2013-08-30
7	7	Battlefield Earth – Kampf um die Erde (Battlefield Earth – Fight for the Earth)	Battlefield Earth	2000	Beer	every laugh is toasted	2013-09-06
8	8	Perry Rhodan – SOS aus dem Weltall (Perry Rhodan – SOS from Outer Space)	...4...3...2...1...Morte	1967	Perry Rhodan Perioden Plum Punch	every time, there's a scary noise or when someone does "science"	2013-09-13
9	9	Orcs – Sie kommen, um uns alle zu töten (Orcs – They come to kill us all)	Orcs!	2011	Bloody Mordor	whenever the word "orcs" is spoken	2013-09-27
10	10	Frogs	Frogs	1972	Everglades Surprise	every time, a frog is visible in the film (for each missed frog a double shot as a penalty)	2013-10-04
11	11	Sumuru – Die Tochter des Satans (Sumuru – The Daughter of Satan)	The Million Eyes of Sumuru	1967	Original Sumuru Schlüpferschließer (Mumu-Tsu)	every time, men's dignity is destroyed by a woman	2013-10-11
12	12	Mega Piranha	Mega Piranha	2010	Orinoco-Knockout (Mega-Cai-Piranha)	every time, a Piranha jumps	2013-10-18

♣ also: Knochenbrecher im Wilden Westen (Bone Breaker in the Wild West)

=== Season 2 ===
No. (Sum)	Nr. (Season)	German Film Title (Literally translated title)	Original Movie Name [imdb link]	Release	Cocktail	Drinking Game	Airing date
13	1	Sharknado – Genug gesagt! (Sharknado – Enough said!)	Sharknado	2013	Hai Tai Haiopai	every time, a shark flies	2014-01-10
14	2	Blacula	Blacula	1972	Bloody Blacky	every bite of a vampire	2014-02-07
15	3	Titanic 2 – Die Rückkehr (Titanic II – The Return)	Titanic II	2010	Iceberg Surprise	every bad CGI scene	2014-03-07
16	4	Die sieben Männer der Sumuru (The seven Men of Sumuru)	The Girl from Rio	1969	Summa Sumuru Clit Sprizz	every time, a person is tortured	2014-04-04
17	5	Monster des Grauens greifen an! (Horror Monsters attack!)	Gezora, Ganime, Kamēba: Kessen! Nankai no Daikaijū	1970	Echs’ on the Beach	every time, a monster roars or makes any kind of noise	2014-05-02
18	6	Die schwarzen Zombies von Sugar Hill (The Black Zombies of Sugar Hill)	Sugar Hill	1974	Voodoo Würgens	every new Zombie	2014-06-06
19	7	Zwiebel-Jack räumt auf (Onion Jack is cleaning up)	Cipolla Colt	1975	Long Onion Ice Tea; Zwie-Bellini; Zwiebel-Bowle	every time, Onion-Jack bites into an onion or drinks onion juice	2014-07-11
20	8	Camel Spiders – Angriff der Monsterspinnen (Camel Spiders – Attack of the Monster Spiders)	Camel Spiders	2011	Solifugae Solifugaa	every time, a spider or a person is killed	2014-08-01
21	9	Sharknado 2	Sharknado 2: The Second One	2014	Hai Tai Zwaiopai	every time, of a cameo appearance	2014-11-21
22	10	Flotte Teens und heiße Jeans (Hot Teens and Hot Jeans)	La liceale	1975	Happy Hymen Virgin Buster	–	2014-11-28
23	11	Airplane vs. Volcano	Airplane vs. Volcano	2014	Lava Lava Liver Burner, Kerosin Sprizzz	every time... you want/need a drink (drink at your own will)	2014-12-05
24	12	Dracula jagt Frankenstein (Dracula hunts Frankenstein)	Los Monstruos del Terror	1970	Team Dracula: Vamp-Eierlikör; Team Frankenstein: Franken-Steinhäger	every time, a helpless woman screams	2014-12-12

=== Season 3 ===
Part of the 3. Season was the special on 29 February 2016 'Tag der Untoten' ("Day of the Undead") with the movies Vampirella and Blacula.

No. (Sum)	Nr. (Season)	German Film Title (Literally translated title)	Original Movie Name [imdb link]	Release	Cocktail	Drinking Game	Airing date
25	1	Der Hammer (The Hammer)	No Holds Barred	1989	Alk Hogan	every time, Hulk Hogan wears a new, horrible outfit	2015-06-19
26	2	Battle of Los Angeles	Battle of Los Angeles	2011	L-Alien Ass Kicker	every time, anybody mentions the name "Arnstead"	2015-06-26
27	3	Pudelnackt in Oberbayern (Poodle naked in Upper Bavaria)	Pudelnackt in Oberbayern	1969	Bajuwarisches Blankbusen bier	every time, a naked breast appears	2015-07-03
28	4	Xanadu	Xanadu	1980	Olivia-Newton-John-Tra-Volta-Tü-Ta-Taa	every time, somebody dance or sing	2015-07-10
29	5	Mega Python vs. Gatoroid	Mega Python vs. Gatoroid	2011	Team Python: Mega Pythons Spei-Ing Circus; Team Gator: Batida de Croco	Team Python: every time, somebody is prey of a python Team Gator: every time, somebody is prey of an alligator	2015-07-17
30	6	Der Dampfhammer von Send-Ling (Send-Ling's Steam Hammer)	Wú Zhāo Shèng Yǒu Zhāo	1979	Kung Fuzzius Screw Driver	every time, the ape of the hero appears	2015-07-24
31	7	Supersonic Man	Supersonic Man	1979	Vodka Sonic / Super-Power-Pussy-Punch	every time, the hero discovers a new super power	2015-07-31
32	8	Thor – Der Allmächtige (Thor – The Almighty)	Almighty Thor	2011	Balla-Balla-Walhalla-Wurst-Wasser-Woousa	–	2015-08-07
33	9	Double Trouble – Warte, bis mein Bruder kommt (Double Trouble – Wait for my Brothers arrival)	Double Trouble	1992	Doppel-Moppel-Mucki-Schlucki	every time, an actor/actress appears, which is more famous than the two main actors	2015-08-14
34	10	Vampirella	Vampirella	1996	Blut-Tooth	every time, Vampirellas huge decollete is visible	2015-08-21
35	11	Roboter der Sterne (Robots of the Stars)	Tie Chao Ren	1974	Großer Halluzinator	every time, the "magische Ballermann" ("Maha Baron") (the big, red robot) rotates his head	2015-08-28
36	12	Sharknado 3	Sharknado 3: Oh Hell No!	2015	Hai Tai Draiopai	every time, Fin Shepard (the hero of the movie) kills a shark	2015-09-05
37	13	Knight Rider 2000	Knight Rider 2000	1991	Schlucking For Freedom Berlin Brusthaar Booster	every time, the movie get real boring	2015-11-27
38	14	Hentai Kamen	Hentai Kamen	2013	Pipi Popo Pöter Punsch	every time, Hentai Kamen brings his balls to the face of an enemy (aka. pervers special attack "Golden Powerbomb")	2015-12-04
39	15	Planet der Dinosaurier (Planet of the Dinosaurs)	Planet of Dinosaurs	1977	48-Hour-Dinosaur-Sour	every time, main character Jim gets snotty, smart-arse, and tell everybody, how it's done	2015-12-11
40	16	Snow Sharks	Avalanche Sharks	2013	Großer Weißer Kopfabreisser	every time, somebody says/mentions "Skuquum"	2015-12-18

=== Season 4 ===
In March 2016 Tele 5 announced season 4, which includes twelve movies.

No. (Sum)	Nr. (Season)	German Film Title (Literally translated title)	Original Movie Name [imdb link]	Release	Cocktail	Drinking Game	Airing date
41	1	Musik, Musik – da wackelt die Penne (Music, Music – The School wobbles)	Musik, Musik – da wackelt die Penne	1970	Mündliche Prüfung (Power-Pauker-Pennen-Wackler)	ever time, a cold-served bang returns from the funny young people	2016-07-15
42	2	Arachnoquake	Arachnoquake	2012	Karamba, Arachno, ein Whiskey	every time, somebody says "Pops"	2016-07-22
43	3	Libero (Sweeper)	Libero	1973	Außenrist-Spritz-Kaiser-Franz-Fizz	every time, men with distinctive sideburns appears	2016-07-29
44	4	Allan Quatermain and the Temple of Skulls	Allan Quatermain and the Temple of Skulls	2008	Pain in the Brain-Quatermain	every time, somebody breaths, groans or gasps eccentricly; particularly speziell Lady Anna	2016-08-05
45	5	Sharktopus vs. Pteracuda – Kampf der Urzeitgiganten (Sharktopus vs. Pteracuda – Battle of the Primeval Giants)	Sharktopus vs. Pteracuda	2014	Team Cuda: Barracuda Schluckluder; Team Pussy: Sharktopus Leberschuss	Team Cuda: every time, a person is prey of the Pterodactylus-Barracuda; Team Pussy: every time, a person is prey of a shark	2016-08-12
46	6	Dämonen aus dem All (Demons from Outer Space)	La Morte viene dal pianeta Aytin	1967	Jetzt Yeti Party richtig los – Himalaya Hirnhäcksler	every time, "our" Commander Jackson simulates competence with a firm voice and then only tells some hair-raising nonsense	2016-08-19
47	7	Daniel, der Zauberer (Daniel – The Wizard)	Daniel – Der Zauberer	2004	Coco Loco Küblböck-Cocksucker	every time, when the Eggenfeldener protozoon (Daniel) changes his outfit	2016-08-26 ♠
48	8	Metropolis 2000	I nuovi barbari	1982	Apokalypse Lau	every time, when you marvel a 'dog rough' stunt in slow-motion	2016-09-02
49	9	Invasion aus dem Innern der Erde (Invasion from Inside the Earth)	Zhōngguó Chāorén	1975	Hi Ho Hongkong Hirnhaut Hobler	every time, when one of the evil 'supermonster' uses a never-seen superpower	2016-09-09
50	10	Ich – ein Groupie (I – A Groupie)	Ich – Ein Groupie	1970	Bumskino Billigballerbrühe	every time, a naked breast appears	2016-09-16
51	11	Ator II – Der Unbesiegbare (Ator II – The Invincible)	Ator 2 - L'invincibile Orion	1984	Miles O'Keeffe – Aperitiv (Schiefer Kiefer Zungen-Triefer)	every time, when Ator crosses blades with an opponent	2016-09-23
52	12	Der Koloß von Konga (The Colossus of Konga)	Xīngxīng wáng	1977	Team Monkey: Hong Kong King Kong Ping Pong Ding Dong; Team Human: Human Touch & Platsch	Team Monkey: every time, when main actor "Utam" gets a well-deserved close-up Team Human: every time, when the extremely stupid so-called "hero" of the movie "Chen Fu" does something totally stupid, senselessly stupid or hair-raisingly wrong	2016-09-30
53	13	Sharknado 4	Sharknado: The 4th Awakens	2016	Hai Tai Zwaimalzwaiopai	every time, when the fun-loving makers of this movie have integrated a subtle parodistic film quote into the movie	2016-12-02
54	14	Wenn die tollen Tanten kommen (When the awesome Aunts come)	Wenn die tollen Tanten kommen	1970	I'm just a sweet Transvestite am Wörthersee (Rüttens erster Vorschlag "Der Ilja Richter und sein Henker" wurde von Kalkofe abgelehnt mit der Begründung, dass in der werberelevanten Zielgruppe den Dürrenmatt "keine Sau kennt")	every time, when the generally predominant image of women in the 70s is eloquently illustrated in the film by chauvinistic-sexist jokes or clumsy assaults	2016-12-09
55	15	Jack Frost – Der eiskalte Killer (Jack Frost – The Ice Cold Killer)	Jack Frost	1997	Snowball in hell auf ex und zwar schnell	every time, Jack Frost works on his day job and makes another victim	2016-12-16
56	16	Santa Claus	Santa Claus	1959	Fucking Hell Jingle Bell Santa Slayer	every time, when Santa laughs for no reason	2016-12-23

=== Season 5 ===
No. (Sum)	Nr. (Season)	German Film Title (Literally translated title)	Original Movie Name [imdb link]	Release	Cocktail	Drinking Game	Airing date
57	1	Hentai Kamen: Abnormal Crisis	Hentai Kamen: Abunōmaru Kuraishisu	2016	Koko Kaka Klöten Klopper	every time, Hentai Kamen draws his classic King-testicle-collision "directly in the face" or another one of his extremely perverted special attacks	2017-06-30
58	2	Im Dschungel ist der Teufel los (The Devil is loose in the Jungle)	Crazy Jungle Adventure	1982	Mama-Afrika-Malaria-Maneater	every time, our old Ösi-Chaplin Alexander Grill alias "Sammy the steward" verbally fires a mega gag, plays a mega gag or get hit by a gag in return	2017-07-07
59	3	Avengers Grimm	Avengers Grimm	2015	Rotnäschen und der böse Alk (aka Red Rülpsing Schluck)	every time, the girls nag each other	2017-07-14
60	4	Macho Man	Macho Man	1985	René-Weller- Faustpropeller-Fressendeller	every time, a never-seen man with a moustache appears	2017-07-21
61	5	Hobgoblins	Hobgoblins	1988	Hobgoblin-Hirn-Hornhaut-Heinzelmann	for every Hobgoblin that appears	2017-07-28
62	6	Samurai Cop	Samurai Cop	1991	Big-Dick-Wonder-Wig-Koma-Kick	every time, the wig is visible	2017-08-04
63	7	Sunshine Reggae auf Ibiza (Sunshine Reggae on Ibiza)	Sunshine Reggae auf Ibiza	1983	Titten, Sonne, Alte Witza – Heidewitzka auf Ibiza	Team Love: every joke about sex and affection Team Songs: every terrible shit song or vibe Schlager	2017-08-11
64	8	Abraham Lincoln vs. Zombies	Abraham Lincoln vs. Zombies	2012	Let's make America even greater – Lincoln Zombie-Annihilator!	every zombie eliminated	2017-08-18
65	9	Die Brut des Bösen (The Brood of Evil)	Die Brut des Bösen	1979	Nanu Lanoo Zack Bumm Anders Rum!	every time, our chicken-chested hero-stereotype brings own one of his opponents	2017-08-25
66	10	Sharktopus vs. Whalewolf	Sharktopus vs. Whalewolf	2015	Team Sharky: Sharktopus Leberschuss! Team Wolfi: Wolfswal Schädelqual!	Team Sharky: every victim that is assigned to the murderous shark mutant in the moving Krakenbein ballet skirt Team Wolfi: every wolfishly random devastation victim	2017-09-01
67	11	Max und Moritz Reloaded (Max and Moritz Reloaded)	Max und Moritz Reloaded	2005	Mad Max and Mental Moritz Mass-Murder Molotov-Cocktail	every constructed taboo break	2017-09-08
68	12	Star Crash – Sterne im Duell (Star Crash – Stars in a Duel)	Starcrash	1978	Star Crash Film Trash Brain Smash	every time, one of the main characters of the intergalactic spectacle – reveals some new "ability"	2017-09-15
69	13	Sharknado 5: Global Swarming	5harknado: Global Swarming	2017	Hai Tai Haiaiaiaiaiopai	Team Fin: every time, when Chief Shark Slasher Fin takes one out Team Fun: every time, if in the picture a person is eaten, beaten, crushed or otherwise done in a funny way by a shark	2017-12-01
70	14	Lord of the Elves – Das Zeitalter der Halblinge (Lord of the Elves – The Age of Halflings)	Clash of the Empires	2012	If there are no fucking Elves – you have to make them up yourselves!	every time, when a terribly lifelike monster appears in the picture, which makes our blood freeze in our veins	2017-12-08
71	15	Bigfoot – Die Legende lebt! (Bigfoot – The Legend Lives!)	Bigfoot	2012	Bigfoot Blaster-Brainfuck Disaster	every time, Bigfoot kills a human	2017-12-15
72	16	Mister Dynamit – Morgen küßt Euch der Tod (Mister Dynamite – Tomorrow Death will kiss You)	Mister Dynamit – Morgen küßt Euch der Tod	1967	Dynamit-im-Schritt-Agenten-Sprit	every time, a fast zoom and/or hard camera panning one will be poured	2017-12-22

=== Season 6 ===
Since all films have a rating of 12 years and up, the broadcast time was brought forward from about 22:15 to 20:15.

The winter season aired the sixth and last part of the Sharknado series.

No. (Sum)	Nr. (Season)	German Film Title (Literally translated title)	Original Movie Name [imdb link]	Release	Cocktail	Drinking Game	Airing date
73	1	Spiceworld – Der Film (Spiceworld – The Movie)	Spice World	1997	Spice Spice Lady auf Ice Ice Baby	every time, the Spice Girls sing	2018-04-06
74	2	Der Polyp – Die Bestie mit den Todesarmen (The Polyp – The Beast with the Arms of Death)	Tentacoli	1977	Kraken – Miracle – Tentacle – Debacle	every time, the Kraken attacks anyone or anything	2018-04-13
75	3	Herkules	Hercules	1983	Mega-Mucki Muskeltini	every time, Hercules uses his magnificent muscles and or a particularly exciting event is shown in slow motion	2018-04-20
76	4	Argoman – Der phantastische Supermann (Argoman – The fantastic Superman)	Come rubare la corona d'Inghilterra	1967	After Sex Six Hour Nix Power	every time, awesome Argoman uses one of his fantastic super powers	2018-04-27
77	5	Die Rückkehr des King Kong (The Return of King Kong)	Kingu Kongu tai Gojira	1962	Team King Kong: King Kong Ding Dong Sching Schong Bing Bong Sing Along; Team Godzilla: Atom Godzilla Leber-Killer	Team King Kong: every time, Kong shouts and rumbles Team Godzilla: every time, Godzilla emits his familiar and beloved monster cry	2018-08-03
78	6	Strippers vs. Werewolves	Strippers vs Werewolves	2012	Lupusreiner hundsgemeiner Stripper Ripper!	every time, "2-to-6 window split-screens" and/or "trick and scratch" crossfades	2018-08-10
79	7	Slugs	Slugs, muerte viscosa	1988	Viskos verrotzter Schneckenschleim-Schlotzer	every time, an innocent person is verified murdered and the snails munch	2018-08-17
80	8	Die Todesgöttin des Liebescamps (The Death Goddess of the Love Camp)	Die Todesgöttin des Liebescamps	1981	Anders ist besser, aber Christian nicht ♦	every time, there is a clearly identifiable, absolutely indisputable exploitation element in the film	2018-08-24
81	9	Saltwater: Atomic Shark	Saltwater	2016	Atom-Hai-Way-To-Hell!	every time, our anaerobic nuclear waste disposal place wipes out the life of some unfortunate human being	2018-08-31
82	10	Die Insel der Ungeheuer (The Island of Monsters)	The Food of the Gods	1976	Rat Pack – Ex & Weg (auch bekannt als Ratatouille Huiuiui)	every time, we see huge rats, gigantic chickens or other mega-sized monster creatures	2018-09-07
83	11	Sorceress – Die Mächte des Lichts (Sorceress – The Powers of Light)	Sorceress	1982	Alter Falter Licht-Abschalter	every time, anyone talks about the "Two who are One". Or if it's somehow shown how "One is the two" is.	2018-09-14
84	12	Cowboys vs. Dinosaurs	Cowboys vs Dinosaurs	2015	Team Cowboy: Dinohasser Feuerwasser; Team Dino: After Hour Dinosaur Cowboy-Aua Sweet & Sour	Team Cowboy: every time, a cowboy or a human being in general blows out the already long blazing light of life to a dinosaur Team Dino: every time, a naturally aggressive self-made Sauropoda kills a human	2018-09-21
85	13	Sharknado 6: The Last One	The Last Sharknado: It's About Time	2018	Hai-Tai-Juhu-Endlich-Vorbei-Opai	for every time travel or strange anomaly that may be caused by such	2018-11-30
86	14	Gefangene im Weltraum (Prisoners in Outer Space)	Prison Ship	1986	A Long Time Ago in a Galaxy Far, Far Away – Called Fred Olen Ray	every time, a woman is involved in a combat	2018-12-07
87	15	Der letzte Lude (The Last Pimp)	Der letzte Lude	2003	Große Freiheit-Schrittverschwitzter-Geile Meile-Ritzenspritzer!	every time, naked skin, erotic or otherwise suggestive St. Pauli-slippery is shown	2018-12-14
88	16	Jack Frost 2 – Die Rache des Killerschneemanns (Jack Frost 2 – Revenge of the Killer Snowman)	Jack Frost 2: Revenge of the Mutant Killer Snowman	2000	Schnee Ade Karibik Hirnfick!	for every rotten assassination by Jack	2018-12-21

♦ also: Anders ist besser (Different is better, slogan of Tele 5)

=== Season 7 ===
A Marvel film was presented at the beginning. The film premiered in Hamburg in the presence of the hosts before it was shown on Tele 5 at 10 pm. For the hundredth episode a big live event took place on 28 September 2019, at the Tempodrom in Berlin. The summer season opened on 23 August 2019, with "Plan 9 from Outer Space". This film is often mentioned when people ask for the worst film ever. It already celebrated its premiere in the Schlefaz version at the Filmfest München on 29 June 2019.

No. (Sum)	Nr. (Season)	German Film Title (Literally translated title)	Original Movie Name [imdb link]	Release	Cocktail	Drinking Game	Airing date
89	1	Captain America	Captain America	1990	Team Hero: Oh Captain, Mein Captain America Hip Hip Hurra; Team Zero: Heidewitzka Herr Kapitän – United States Tatü-Tata	Team Hero: every time, the fantastic Captain America does something truly heroic (and it won't be little); Team Zero: if, against all logical expectation, he should accidentally do something stupid or even fail	2019-04-26
90	2	Nightbeast – Terror aus dem Weltall (Nightbeast – Terror from Outer Space)	Nightbeast	1982	Alien Annihilator – Nachtbiest-Notfallsanitäter	every time, a shot fired from the special, extraterrestrial laser gun or a conventional, mundane firearm	2019-05-03
91	3	Dragon Crusaders – Im Reich der Kreuzritter und Drachen (Dragon Crusaders – In the Realm of Crusaders and Dragons)	Dragon Crusaders	2011	Der legendäre Drachenficker-Kreuzritter-Liquor	every time, a completely freely created fantasy-mythical creature is in the picture	2019-05-10
92	4	Der Mann mit den zwei Köpfen (The Man with two Heads)	The Incredible 2-Headed Transplant	1971	Southern Discomfort Doppeldecker Kürbis-Cracker	every time at a exploitative representation	2019-05-17
93	5	Plan 9 aus dem Weltall (Plan 9 from Outer Space)	Plan 9 from Outer Space	1959	Champagne, the best the cellar has to offer, from the finest crystal, or the original Ed Wood version: Lukewarm tap water from a plastic cup, even used	every time, a real "Ed Wood moment", in which his very special vision of film art comes clear	2019-08-23
94	6	Dirndljagd am Kilimandscharo (Dirndl Hunt on Kilimanjaro)	Das verrückte Strandhotel	1983	Bumsi-Bumsi-Hahaha-Schnackselspaß in Kenia – Fick for Fun mit Marischka	every time, when we have to watch something sensual-stimulating or hear something connoted in a cheerfully erotic way	2019-08-30
95	7	Die fliegenden Feuerstühle (The Flying Fire Chairs)	Zhui sha	1973	Yamaha-Yamah-Soul-Happy-Hongkong-Punch-Bowl	every shitty kick in a shitty fight	2019-09-06
96	8	Evil Toons – Flotte Teens im Geisterhaus (Evil Toons – Hot Teens in the Haunted house)	Evil Toons	1992	Looney-Tuney-Bampalooney-Balla-Balla-Brägenknaller	whenever we are treated to a chauvinistically beautiful view of an uncovered female breast landscape in the best 90s video cassette pause button press manner	2019-09-13
97	9	Atomic Hero	The Toxic Avenger	1984	Tromaville-Overkill-Rächerbecher	every time, a Splatter, Gore, Hyperbrutalo or even disgusting scene is presented	2019-09-20
98	10	Hausfrauen-Report 3: Alle Jahre wieder – wenn aus blutjungen Mädchen blutjunge Hausfrauen werden (Housewives Report 3: Every year – when very young girls become very young housewives)	Hausfrauen-Report 3: Alle Jahre wieder – wenn aus blutjungen Mädchen blutjunge Hausfrauen werden	1972	Woman in Chains	every time, when a pitiable housewife (Hausfrau) feels unloved, unhappy, or inexplicably dissatisfied with the overall situation	2019-09-27
99	11	Laserkill – Todesstrahlen aus dem All (Laserkill – Death Rays from Outer Space)	Laserblast	1978	Free Billy Silly Killy-Master Blaster Disaster	for any fiery explosion or explosive fire caused by direct or indirect laser blast gun impact	2019-10-04
100	12	Drei Engel auf der Todesinsel (Three Angels on the Island of Death)	The Lost Empire	1985	Mach-Mich-Nasser-Tausendsassa-Hundertwasser	at every typical 'Now that's what I call SchleFaZ' moment, that is, at everything that you could never experience in a really good film, but only here with us	2019-10-11
101	13	The Bees – Operation Todesstachel (The Bees – Operation Death Sting)	The Bees	1978	Let it Bee	every time, if one or more bees can be seen in the film	2019-11-29
102	14	Santa's Slay – Blutige Weihnachten (Santa's Slay – Bloody Christmas)	Santa's Slay	2005	We Wish You a Deadly Christmas and a Bag Full of Fear	every time, the "Red-White" kills innocent people in an announced amusing way	2019-12-06
103	15	Die neuen Abenteuer des Herkules (The New Adventures of Hercules)	Le avventure dell'incredibile Ercole	1985	Ob Herkules, ob Fraukules – Im Olymp herrscht immer Stress	every time, a god, goddess, mythical creature or spiritual name is mentioned	2019-12-13
104	16	6-Headed Shark Attack	6-Headed Shark Attack	2018	Six Shooter-Schädelfluter	every time, anyone is arguing or squabbling with anyone anywhere	2019-12-20

=== Season 8 ===
For the first time the spring season includes six movies. The summer season includes also six movies, the final in winter has four more.

No. (Sum)	Nr. (Season)	German Film Title (Literally translated title)	Original Movie Name [imdb link]	Release	Cocktail	Drinking Game	Airing date
105	1	Troll 2	Troll 2	1990	Grün Gefickter Hirn-Trollator	every time, green slime appears, green sauce, green wobble or any other green liquid in whatever consistency	2020-04-24
106	2	Das rote Phantom schlägt zu (The Red Phantom Strikes)	Superargo contro Diabolikus	1966	Superagro-Grenzdebilish-Extra-Grobmotorisch (in the tradition of Supercalifragilisticexpialidocious)	for every James Bond quote	2020-05-01
107	3	Ator – Herr des Feuers (Ator – Lord of Fire)	Ator l'invincibile	1982	The Ator-Ture Never Stops	every time, we see a new piece of fur	2020-05-08
108	4	Trabbi goes to Hollywood	Trabbi Goes to Hollywood	1991	Blonder kühler Nasenspüler	every time, when birthday blonde and conveyor loudmouth Thomas Gottschalk spices up one of his classic cool phrases from the verbal backhand	2020-05-15
109	5	Tödliche Beute (Deadly Prey)	Deadly Prey	1987	Rambo in the Bamboo – Stallone Klone to the Bone	for every death that our hero Mike Danton causes	2020-05-22
110	6	Der sechste Kontinent (The Sixth Continent)	At the Earth's Core	1976	Pellucidar-Heihopsassa-Saurier-Tirallala	every time, we discover a new fascinating form of primeval flora or fauna that makes our curious explorer heart jump for joy	2020-05-29
111	7	Rock Aliens	Voyage of the Rock Aliens	1984	Ora et Zadora – Pia-Colada-Achdumeinliebervada	every time, a new song is played	2020-08-14
112	8	Die Mumie des Pharao (The Mummy of the Pharaoh)	Dawn of the Mummy	1981	Mummy Mia Anti-Fear-Schockverhütungs-Elixier	every time, when the blood in our veins threatens to freeze with horror, so with every shock effect	2020-08-21
113	9	Laß jucken, Kumpel (Let it itch, Buddy)	Laß jucken, Kumpel	1972	Team Love: Love & Romance Koitus – Liebesluder Leberschuss; Team Suff: Bumsbier mit Molle, vergiss doch die Olle	Team Love: every time, when the physical joining, i.e. the physical expression of love, also known as sexual intercourse, is discussed theoretically or practically Team Suff: every time, one is tilted in the movie	2020-08-28
114	10	Angriff der Riesenspinne (Attack of the Giant Spider)	The Giant Spider Invasion	1975	saftig-süßer Zungenkuss vom Arachne Giganticus	every time, the beast injures, destroys, eats and digests	2020-09-04
115	11	Dollman	Dollman	1991	Nur 33 Zentimeter – Doch hart als wär's ein Teil von Peter; Cocktail-Drink-Veto-Recht by Kalkofe; Selbstjustiz-Mit-Witz-Spritz-Space-Cop-Shrink-Drink	every time, if anyone is harmed anywhere by the direct or indirect action of the Dollman	2020-09-11
116	12	Masters of the Universe	Masters of the Universe	1987	He-Man-She-Girl-It-Thing-Trink-Ding	every time, when the wrinkly bone-face Skeletor gives a command or threat	2020-09-18
117	13	Planet of the Sharks	Planet of the Sharks	2016	Hai as a Kite – SchleFaZ Delight – Waterworld Wannabe-Wave Rider ♦	every time, a shark causes a victim	2020-11-27
118	14	R.O.T.O.R. – Die Killer-Maschine (R.O.T.O.R. – The Killer Machine)	R.O.T.O.R.	1987	Terminator Robo-Motor Law & Order Leber-Rotor ♦	every time, the rough Rotor-RoboCop kills, injures or otherwise uses brutal force	2020-12-04
119	15	Gefangene des Universums (Prisoners of the Universe)	Prisoners of the Lost Universe	1983	Universeller lichtschneller Multi-Dimensions-Umsteller	every time, when the film fully demonstrates its great strengths in the sector "nimble, bright dialog wit"	2020-12-11
120	16	Das Gehirn (The Brain)	The Brain	1988	Here comes the Brain again – Hypophysen-Beglücker-Frontallappenficker	every time, when the evil Brain or one of his hypno-brain hallucinations belonging to him appears, we dump one on the sponge	2020-12-18

The season also included a Halloween special on 31 October 2020, with the films Vampirella (season 3) and The Food of the Gods (season 6).

♦ In the original Version/homepage it is written "Hai as a Knight", but on the movie it was called "Kite"—which gives as the idea how it was meant. Second, in the movie Dr. Shayne Nichols is kite surfing.

♦ See also Rotor syndrome, a liver disease

=== Season 9 ===
On 27 January 2020, it was announced that a ninth season will be aired, beginning in spring. In calendar week 20, shots of new filming for the summer season were published on Twitter.

SchleFaZ 125 will be presented as preview as stream via the net. Special tickets for the event can be bought to interact with Oli and Päter while the film is presented.

The film list was announced on 23 June via Twitter as link to an article. On Twitter, 11 Oct, four scenes for the upcoming winter season were announced and guessed. #ScheißfilmQuartett. "Ach jodel mir doch einen – Strosstrupp Venus bläst zum Angriff!"; Roboshark; The Warrior and the Sorceress.

No. (Sum)	Nr. (Season)	German Film Title (Literally translated title)	Original Movie Name [imdb link]	Release	Cocktail	Drinking Game	Airing date
121	1	Macabra – Die Hand des Teufels (Macabra – The Hand of the Devil)	Demonoid	1981	Ab die Hände, Wochenende Abra-Macabra – Scheisse-Gelabra	every time, the Hand appears	2021-04-09
122	2	America 3000	America 3000	1986	Happy-Doomsday-Tranquilizer-Armageddon-Optimizer	every time, somebody speaks in the "post-apocalyptic" language	2021-04-16
123	3	Zombie Nightmare	Zombie Nightmare	1987	Leck mich fett, Motörhead – Zombies vor, noch ein Thor ♦	every time, when a new metal song sweetens our ears and our hearts	2021-04-23
124	4	Angel's Höllenkommando (Angel's Hell Squad)	Hell Squad	1986	Love Me Gender – Ladykracher Strullemacher	Team Titty Twister: every time, when the motorcycle lights switch to high beam and the huge bells ring Team Testo Terror: every time, our heroic hell squad slaughters a macho male bastard in the spirit of the feminist struggle for freedom, or at least gives him a good smack on the face	2021-04-30
125	5	Disco Godfather	Disco Godfather	1979	One-Twenty-Five-Staying-Alive-Godfather-Tucker-Godmotherfucker	every time, when we are offered a particularly awesome hairstyle or moustache style creation, or even a particularly cool outfit	2021-08-27
126	6	Sloane – Die Gewalt im Nacken (Sloane – The Violence in your Neck)	Sloane	1985	Sloane Rider-Testosterone-Provider	every time, when someone goes down either knocked out or dead	2021-09-03 ♠
127	7	Time Breaker	Get Mean	1975	Get Even Meaner Crystal Meth-Diener	every time, if something in the film immediately makes no sense at all, is strange or is otherwise out of the expected western pattern	2021-09-10
128	8	Angriff der Riesenkralle (Attack of the Giant Claw)	The Giant Claw	1957	Zicke Zacke Vogelkacke	every time, if a clear budget shortage is recognizable and quality has been unmistakably grabbed into the cheap trick box	2021-09-17
129	9	Das Söldnerkommando (The Mercenary Squad)	Kill Squad	1982	Ommenhauer Scheitelzieher	every time, another fight victim appears begging to have the face plowed up	2021-09-24
130	10	Kampf um die 5. Galaxis (Battle for the 5th Galaxy)	L'umanoide	1979	Galaktisch praktisch guter Hirnanhangdrüsenfluter	every time, anything in the film is obviously and undoubtedly copied from Star Wars	2021-10-01
131	11	Rise of the Animals – Mensch vs. Biest (Rise of the Animals – Human vs. Beast)	Rise of the Animals	2011	No Tears for Fears cause of Pets, Bears or Deers – Cheers	every time, the computer animates an animal or a lifelike animal puppet teaches us the fear, uh, teach	2021-10-08
132	12	Liebesgrüße aus Fernost (From the Far East with Love)	Wonder Women	1973	Manilla-Vanilla-Ladykilla	every time, women talk about banging we will raise the drink	2021-10-15
133	13	Roboshark	Roboshark	2015	Triple SMS Social Media Shark – Sauf's-mir-schön-Scheißfilm-Modifizierungsschluck	every time, somebody is tweeting, texting or otherwise messing around on the internet and social media in the film	2021-11-19
134	14	Sadomona – Insel der teuflischen Frauen (Sadomona – Island of the devilish women)	Policewomen	1974	Anti Prison Breaker Pro Feminism Faker Policewomen Peacemaker	every time, women hit other people	2021-11-26
135	15	Der Krieger und die Hexe (The Warrior and the Witch)	The Warrior and the Sorceress	1984	Fantasy with Dignity aka Naked Breasts and Sorcery aka Magical Mystery Mindblower	every time, an interesting and/or dramaturgical feature that you wouldn't have expected in such a way	2021-12-03
136	16	Ach jodel mir noch einen (Oh yodel me one more)	Ach jodel mir noch einen	1974	Jodel Dodel Rumsbums Reibstoff	every time, when sex and erotic are thematised in a subtly humorous way	2021-12-10

♦ also Tor (German) = goal in association football (de) and Thor

♠ World TV premiere of this movie

=== Season 10 ===
The season in 2022 was announced on Twitter at 0:50 am on New Year. The tenth season starts at March, 18 with Super Mario Bros, Slavegirls, Rock 'n' Roll Nightmare and the Action-Horror-Thriller Grizzly II.

The return for the summer season was announced the day after the last spring movie was broadcast. Four moderations where shot in Mai. On 13 July the start was announced on 9 September. From footage of the shooting this movies were guessed:

- Gib Gas – Ich will Spaß! (1983)
- It Happened at Lakewood Manor (1977)
- Il boia scarlatto (Bloody Pit of Horror) (1965)
- The Norseman (1978)

On 29 July the eight movies have been promoted by Oliver Kalkofe on Twitter:

There will be no winter season because of the Football World Cup in Qatar from 21 November – 18 December. The autumn season will have eight movies.

No. (Sum)	Nr. (Season)	German Film Title (Literally translated title)	Original Movie Name [imdb link]	Release	Cocktail	Drinking Game	Airing date
137	1	Super Mario Bros. (film)	Super Mario Bros.	1993	Hoskins Hopper Klempner Klopper ♦	every time, when things get really absurd or our own internal film logic is destroyed; so at every momentary knotting of the logic threads...	2022-03-18
138	2	Rock 'n' Roll Nightmare (In the Presence of Hell)	Rock 'n' Roll Nightmare	1987	We're Proud To Sell Your Brainfuck-Ticket To Hell	every time, an obvious "full" image, er... filler image and with every point of view shot! Rock on	2022-03-25
139	3	Slave Girls from Beyond Infinity (Raiders of the lost Galaxy)	Slave Girls from Beyond Infinity	1987	Infinity Insanity Cause of a Missing Galaxy-Immediately Security Slammer!	every time, when dialogues surprise us either by enormous profundity or triviality; it counts both the banal platitude, exorbitantly significant or also matters of the completely obvious	2022-04-01
140	4	Grizzly II: Revenge	Grizzly II: The Predator	2020	Dom Bärignon! ♥	every time, when so-called stock footage is used – that is modern footage that actually has nothing to do with the original filmgame	2022-04-08 ♠
141	5	Hai-Alarm auf Mallorca (Shark Alarm on Mallorca)	Hai-Alarm auf Mallorca	2004	Malle-Möller-Haifisch-Böller	every time, too much kitsch and soapiness is used	2022-09-09
142	6	Die Barbaren (The Barbarians)	The Barbarians	1987	Anabol-stereoide Frozen-Barbaritaℳ -Sympathomimetika	every time, when – in addition to all the brutal barbarity -, comedy, jokes and pranks also have a rendezvous	2022-09-16
143	7	Kara Murat – Sein Kung-fu ist tödlich ♣ (Kara Murat – His kung fu is lethal )	Kara Murat: Seyh Gaffar'a Karsi	1976	Mental Oriental aka Kung Fu Kicker Kleinhirn Ficker	every time, when Kara Murat in battle pulls a never-before-seen weapon out of thin air or executes a jump with artistic precision	2022-09-23
144	8	Creatures from the Abyss	Plankton	1994	Fis-Disser-Logic Dissmisser-Abysser-Ass-Kisser	every time, when there is a POV camera shot from a monster's perspective	2022-09-30
145	9	Das Schreckensschloß des scharlachroten Henkers (The Terrors Castle of the Scarlet Executioner)	Il boia scarlatto	1965	Folterdipolter Scharlachburger Meisterbrand	every time, someone is murdered, tortured or it gives you the creeps...	2022-10-07
146	10	Die Nordmänner (The North Men)	The Norseman	1978	Conquerors Without Brain And Glamour – Fucking Stupid Norseman-Slammer	every time, a Viking historical error can be identified in speech or picture	2022-10-14
147	11	In der Gewalt der Riesenameisen (In the grip of the giant ants)	Empire of the Ants	1977	Put Some Ants in Your Pants And Then Dance, Dance, Dance	First half: every time, the broker logo "Dreamland shores" is in sight Second half: every time, man and giant ant meet in face to face combat	2022-10-21
148	12	Gib Gas – Ich will Spaß! (Hit the gas – I want fun!)	Gib Gas - Ich will Spaß!	1983	NDW-Juchhee-Nüchternheit-Adé-Markus-Nena-Leberdehner!	every time, Nena rufles her hair or laughs	2022-10-28

♦ translation: whopper – LEO: Übersetzung im Englisch ⇔ Deutsch Wörterbuch

♥ also Bär (German) = bear

♠ World TV premiere of this movie

ℳ also Margarita

♣ aka "Kara Murat – Der Rächer Anatoliens" and other, see Kara Murat - Der Rächer Anatoliens

On 23 December 2022, the SchleWaZ (Worst Christmas of all time) Sharknado – Enough said! (2.1) and on 30 December 2022 Cowboys vs. Dinosaurs (6.12) was shown as SchleSaZ (Worst New Year's Eve ever).

=== Season 11 ===
On 8 February the SchleFaZ account on Twitter announced the start of shooting of the moderation for the 11th season in calendar week 7. In four days the shooting for the four movies was done.

After showing stills for the movies the Twitter users could guess – and found Megaforce, Beerfest and the 150th will be Tammy and the T-Rex.

In KW 17 for of the summer movies where shown via a picture of the costumes. The films "Barbarian Queen", "Wizards of the Lost Kingdom" were guessed.

No. (Sum)	Nr. (Season)	German Film Title (Literally translated title)	Original Movie Name [imdb link]	Release	Cocktail	Drinking Game	Airing date
149	1	Carambola – Vier Fäuste schlagen wieder zu (Carambola – Four fists strike again)	Carambola	1974	Copy & Paste – Oh What A Waste	every time, whenever one of the title-giving four fists does its duty and strikes; but beware: only the clenched fist counts – headbutts, boot kick or flat hand do not count!	2023-04-07
150	2	Tammy and the Teenage T-Rex	Tammy and the T-Rex	1994	Bloody Tammy; Sexy Rexy	every time, when the dino "moves" – i.e. the clumsy T-Rex moves in any way worth mentioning, presents us with a new move or otherwise goes into action. Prooooost & Happy 150 – SchleFaaaaaZ!	2023-04-14 ♠
151	3	Megaforce	Megaforce	1982	May The Megaforce Be With You – It's The Only Way To Get Through!	every time, when no one dies in the film, even though everything imaginable has been was done!	2023-04-21
152	4	Bierfest	Beerfest	2006	Weizen helles Kölsch-Pils-Alt, das lecker warm am besten knallt	is always to be enjoyed when there is, uh, yes, drinking in the movie	2023-04-28
153	5	Supersound und flotte Sprüche (Super sound and catchy phrases)	Can't Stop the Music	1980	Can't Stop The Vollsuff – Village People Schluckspecht Schniepel	every time, a new actor or actress appears (no extra!)	2023-09-08
154	6	Mutant – Das Grauen im All (Mutant – The horror in space)	Forbidden World	1982	Wahre Schönheit kommt von innen – Facehugger-Fertilitäts-Fizz!	every time, Space Marshal Mike Colby asks a question about the scientific experiments, the nature of the monster or how to deal with it...	2023-09-15
155	7	Ein Königreich vor unserer Zeit (A kingdom before our time)	Wizards of the Lost Kingdom	1985	Hokus Pokus Fazibus – Brägen schiss und Darmverschluss	is to be enjoyed every time, whenever magic is applied, hexed or conjured!	2023-09-22
156	8	Im Reich der Amazonen (In the realm of the Amazons)	Amazons	1986	Amazons Prime – It's Butt and Boob fest-Time	every time, when naked nipples flash teasingly or bare butts whizz across the battlefield!!	2023-09-29
157	9	Tod im Spielzeugland (Death in toyland)	Dollman vs. Demonic Toys	1993	Klein aber Oho – Steck den Kopf ins Klo!	every time, when an act of aggression or violence is carried out on the screen. When it comes to punching and shooting – a drink for peace! Or also: When others fight or brawl, let's drink for peace! Because instead of murdering and killing, we would rather solder ourselves!	2023-10-06
158	10	Giganten mit stählernen Fäusten (Giants with fists of steel)	Deathsport	1978	Nichts ist verziehen, Mr. Carradine – Corman Knockout-Cross!	every time, Kaz Oshay becomes angry, cynical, trusting, tender, or Zen-transcendent	2023-10-13
159	11	Beast You!	Sorority Babes in the Slimeball Bowl-O-Rama	1988	Heisse Feger aus der Schwesternschafts-Verbindung in der Schleimball-Kegel-Arena!	every time, when we can celebrate the much quoted fun-party-feeling, which flicks of this kind always deliver, when there is clumsy-sadistic violence, pubertal-sexist humor or simply poodle-naked plump-bums and bare-breasts to laugh at...	2023-10-20
160	12	Yeti – Der Schneemensch kommt (Yeti – The Snowman Comes)	Yeti – Il gigante del 20° secolo	1977	Himalaya Tiralala – Der Yeti ist für alle da!	every time, when the Yeti goes into action angrily or just looks exceptionally stupid – because exceptionally silly facial expressions are also definitely part of his core competence!	2023-10-27 ♆
161	13	Piranha Sharks	Piranha Sharks	2017	Hai-Piranha-Caipirinha	every time, when a shark, a piranha or piranha shark is seen, in whatever form!	2023-12-01
162	14	Iron Thunder	I Bought a Vampire Motorcycle	1990	Norton hört ein Hu – wird zu Nosferatu und saugt dein Blut im Nu!	every time, when the Norton (the bike in the film) kills an unfortunate victim.	2023-12-08
163	15	Space Truckers	Space Truckers	1996	Er fliegt 'n 30 Tonner Diesel und ist die meiste Zeit im All – Truck Driver-Flüssigurknall!	every time, if we are all "supposed" to laugh at this production, which is labeled as a sci-fi comedy	2023-12-15
164	16	Hard Ticket to Hawaii	Hard Ticket to Hawaii	1987	Hai-Tai Hai Hawaii !!! Pulled Pork Hard Ticket to Hawaii Burger	last time, when one of the great Bs is shown: Bomben/Ballereien, Blut or blankgezogene Bollermänner	2023-12-22

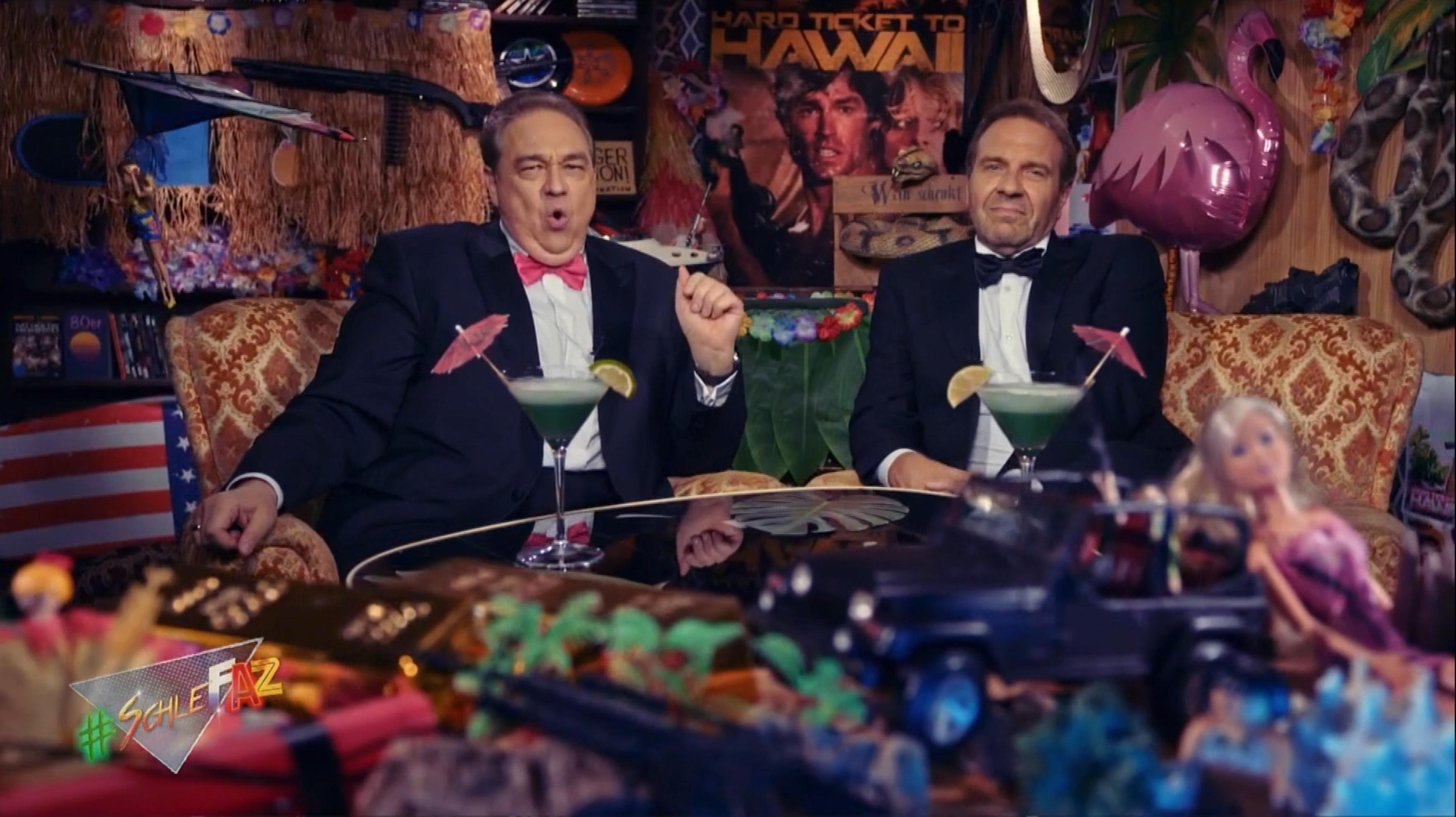

♆ also live event in Cologne with both presenters on the Cologne Comedy Festival

♠ German TV premiere of the restored gore version

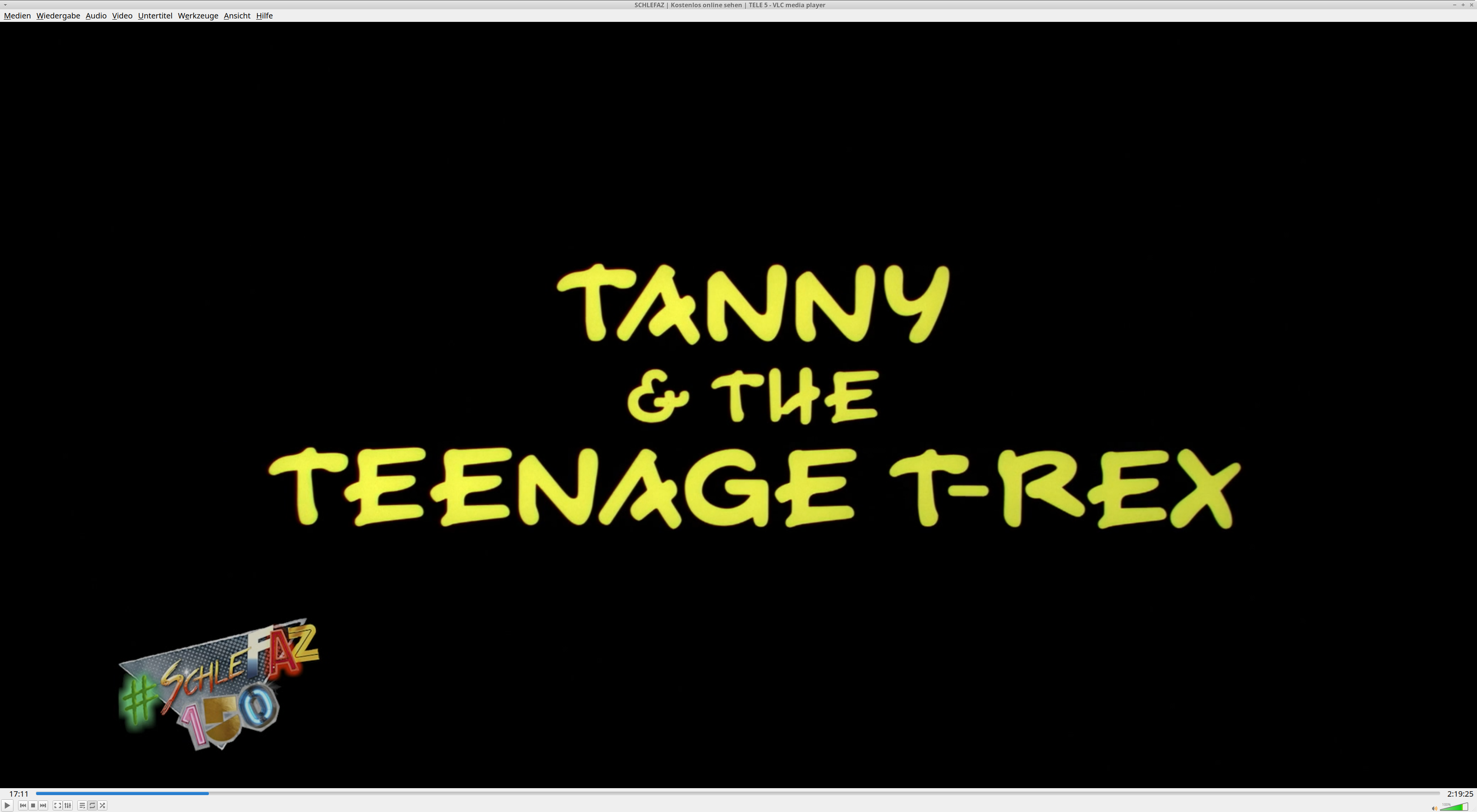

Although Denise Richards' character is named Tammy in the film, the beginning and end credits list her as "Tanny". That is the name used in the original title, "Tanny and the Teenage T-Rex", as given in the uncut version released on 4K and Blu-ray by Vinegar Syndrome.

On 31 December 2023, the episodes of Hentai Kamen and Kara Murat were rebroadcast.

== Airing data (NITRO) ==
=== Season 12 ===
Starting next fall, ten new episodes will be shown on NITRO and on the RTL streaming platform RTL+ – there a week before the airing.

On 16 June the first post on X mention the start end of August and showed also two pics of the costumes.

Unbelievable – 10 neue Folgen #SchleFaZ im Kasten!

Ende August geht's los bei @NITRO @RTLplus

The new X hastag #SchleFaZbeiNitro was also established.

Two live events are planned:

29. August in Berlin and 28. October in Duisburg, at which the two hosts will present their comments to "SchlaFaZ" fans.

No. (Sum)	Nr. (Season)	German Film Title (Literally translated title)	Original Movie Name [imdb link]	Release	Cocktail	Drinking Game	Airing date
165	1	S.O.S. Barracuda: Der Tod spielt Roulette (SOS Barracuda: Death plays Roulette)	S.O.S. Barracuda: Der Tod spielt Roulette	1999	Barracu-hier, Barracu-da – Ideen sind zum Klauen da	every time, when a affectionate homage to another cinema classic is recognized – i.e. when something is stolen somewhere in a bold way	2024-08-30
166	2	Aerobicide	Killer Workout	1987	David A. Prior On Fire-Spandextighter Aerobicide-Fighter	the cocktail should be taken as a brain-protective antidote to any shock murder or shock sexism	2024-09-06
167	3	A*P*E	Kingkongui Daeyeokseub	1976	Gorilla-Kacke Schnullerbacke!	every time, when a visually stunning 3D effect enriches our retina! In other words: every imaginary 3D effect makes us take a sip	2024-09-13
168	4	Der Einzelkämpfer (The lone warrior)	Death Dimension	1978	Einzelkämpfer Schluck-Schalldämpfer	every time, when the lone warrior does the same with fist and foot: If they kick and punch, we will dare to take a nip!	2024-09-20
169	5	Sand Sharks	Sand Sharks	2012	Striatolamia Macrota – Niemals war der Hai-Film toter!	every time, with every shark victim we have to mourn	2024-09-27
170	6	Future Zone	Future Zone	1990	John Tucker-Anti-Brainfucker	with every explosion and every shot from a classic 6-shot revolver	2024-10-04
171	7	Die Schreckensmacht der Zombies (The terrifying power of Zombies)	Shock Waves	1977	Angstbefreiter Schockwellen reiter	every time, when people swim, dive, splash, wade, stalk or float around in the water	2024-10-11
172	8	Frankensteins Kung Fu Monster!	Shan dian qi shi	1975	Lass es sein, Frankenstein – Halt Dein Maul und schütt ihn rein	whenever there is an explosion, usually dusty or sandy, in the picture	2024-10-18
173	9	Octaman – Die Bestie aus der Tiefe	Octaman	1971	Tentakel-Debakel im Teich-Trost Tequila	game	2024-10-25
174	10	Der Gorilla von Soho (The Gorilla of Soho)	Der Gorilla von Soho ♆	1968	Wallace oder Nichts – Killer-Gorilla-Brainfuck-Chiller	every time, when we experience a typical “Yes, that's Edgar Wallace” scene or see old familiars or classic trademarks from earlier films appear on screen!	2024-11-01

♆ Der Gorilla von Soho is an Edgard Wallace film out of the famous German Rialto Film series.

=== Season 13 ===
The 13th season was indirectly announced (175. Film) with a join-in campaign. No titles were mentioned.

On April 24 it was announced that the first shots for ten new films - broadcasting to start in September - were done. There will be also some Advent movies. The 175th movie will be a RTL "masterpiece". There will also be a documentary and a podcast about SchleFaZ.

No. (Sum)	Nr. (Season)	German Film Title (Literally translated title)	Original Movie Title [imdb link]	Release	Cocktail	Drinking Game	Airing date
175	10	Der Clown – Tag der Vergeltung (The Clown - Day of Retribution or Payday)	Der Clown	2005	Cocktail	Drink	2025-08-29 (Stream); 2025-12-19
176	1	Zombiber (Zombeaver)	Zombeavers	2014	Burning Beaver-Hater-Zombie-Exterminator	recommended every time for use in any context involving pubertal sexual connotations, inappropriate coarse language, or the staging of inadequate hyper-horror drama	2025-09-05
177	2	Malibu Express	Malibu Express	1985	Malibusen-Exzess-Exzitations-Regulator	every time, when Cody Abilene — or whoever — tells us something off-screen and/or when the name “Chamberlain” is mentioned (also in plural)	2025-09-12
178	3	Die Mumie schlägt zurück (The Mummy hits back)	The Mummy Theme Park	2000	Mummys Little Helper	every time, whenever an Egyptian divinity is mentioned or someone is killed, regardless of why and by whom	2025-09-19
179	4	Biohazard	Biohazard	1985	Ridley Scotch Alien Adopter	every time, when somebody is driving a car, chewing gum, or when artificial fog is generated	2025-09-26
180	5	Zombie Shark	Zombie Shark	2015	You Better Pay Attention To The Zombie Shark Redemption	every time, for every confirmed shark victim - mutilations do not count	2025-10-03
181	6	Drei Supermänner räumen auf (Three supermen clean up)	I fantastici 3 $upermen	1967	Superhüpfer Leberlüpfer	every time, when, as the name suggests, one of our acrobatic hopping heroes jumps or leaps	2025-10-10
182	7	Fighter Gang	Kill and Kill Again	1981	Klosterfrau Kartoffelgeist Brägenficker Fressekicker	every time, when a fight starts — whatever kind it may be	2025-11-28
183	8	Shadowchaser	Shadowchaser	1992	Oh, what a shame for John McClain - Terminator & Die Hard-Dignity saver	Drink	2025-12-05
184	9	Der Schrecken aus der Meerestiefe (The Terror from the Depths of the Sea)	Destination Inner Space	1966	Hoch die Flossen, Fischgenossen!	Drink	2025-12-12

♦ also Mother

=== Season 14 ===
SchleFaZ will return in Autumn for the third season on RTL NITRO.

No. (Sum)	Nr. (Season)	German Film Title (Literally translated title)	Original Movie Title [imdb link]	Release	Cocktail	Drinking Game	Airing date
185	1	Geisterjäger John Sinclair: Die Dämonenhochzeit (Ghost Hunter John Sinclair: The Demon Wedding)	Geisterjäger John Sinclair: Die Dämonenhochzeit	1997	TBA	TBA	2026-10-03 (Live event); 2026-10-30
186	2	Born to Win	Nato per combattere [33]	1989	TBA	TBA	2026-11-06
187	3	Dead Eyes	De profundis [34]	1989	TBA	TBA	2026-11-13
188	4	Stoßtrupp in die Wüste (Assault Unit into the Desert)	Strategia per una missione di morte [35]	1979	TBA	TBA	2026-11-20
189	5	Cleopatra Wong	Cleopatra Wong	1978	TBA	TBA	2026-11-27
190	6	Shark Side of the Moon	Shark Side of the Moon	2022	TBA	TBA	2026-12-04
191	7	Prince of the Sun	Tai yang zhi zi [36]	1989	TBA	TBA	2026-12-11
192	8	Roboman	Robowar - Robot da guerra	1988	TBA	TBA	2026-12-18

== Specials ==
No	Thema	Airing date	Time
01	Die Reportage (1) – Hinter den Kulissen von Beschissen	13 March 2015	25 Min.
02	Die Reportage (2) – Hinter den Kulissen von Beschissen	19 June 2015	49 Min.
03	Am Set von Sharknado 3	5 September 2015	50 Min.
04	Die Reportage (3) – Hinter den Kulissen von Beschissen	27 November 2015	45 Min.
05	Die ganze beschissene Wahrheit – Zuschauer fragen Olli & Peter	20 September 2019	60 Min.
06	Hinter den Kulissen von Beschissen – Eine Schnapsidee wird zum TV-Kult	7 October 2019	10 Min.
07	Hinter den Kulissen von Beschissen – Peter, Olli & die schlechten Filme	7 October 2019	10 Min.
08	Hinter den Kulissen von Beschissen – Schlechte Filme, üble Drinks und geniale Gags	9 October 2019	15 Min.
09	Hinter den Kulissen von Beschissen – Die Kultshow und ihre legendären Fans	10 October 2019	60 Min.
10	Pleiten, Pech und Pannen	27 August 2021	5 Min.
11	Good-Bye #SchleFaZ	31 December 2023	?

=== SchleFaZ Summer 2026 ===
For “SchleFaZ Summer 2026,” NITRO presents four legendary highlights from the first season of SchleFaZ (on NITRO) — including weird storie lines, questionable special effects, and plenty of iconic trash film moments.

Sat., 30.05., 23:00 Uhr: „Sand Sharks“ - #169

Sat., 06.06., 23:00 Uhr: „Der Einzelkämpfer“ - #168

Sat., 20.06., 20:15 Uhr: „Octaman – Die Bestie aus der Tiefe“ - #173

Sat., 27.06., 23:00 Uhr: „Future Zone“ - #170

== Guests ==
In some episodes special guests appear in different ways.

- No. 36 Sharknado 3: Oh Hell No!: Olli Schulz, German singer-songwriter, actor and presenter
- No. 53 Sharknado: The 4th Awakens: Olli Schulz, German singer-songwriter, actor and presenter, Sarah Knappik who had a cameo in the movie
- No. 69 Sharknado 5: Global Swarming : Bela B, Olli Schulz, German singer-songwriter, actor and presenter
- No. 85 Sharknado 6: The Last One: Bela B, Oliver Welke, Peter Flechtner, the voice actor of Ian Ziering; the main actor of the movie; Jörg Strombach, the producer of SchleFaZ; Sarah Knappik, Olli Schulz etc.
- No. 87 Der letzte Lude: Lotto King Karl as Andi Ommsen, main actor in the movie
- No. 100 Drei Engel auf der Todesinsel: Live show with Wolfgang Bahro, Bela B, Helmut Zerlett and the band (Jana König, ...), Christian Steiffen
- No. 111 Voyage of the Rock Aliens: Peter Illmann, ex-hoster of the ARD music program Formel Eins in 1983 and 1984
- No. 124 Angel's Höllenkommando: Bela B, bought for €20 as double for Peter (original statement from Bela B.)
- No. 125 Disco Godfather: Live show with Mola Adebisi, Peter Illmann, Helmut Zerlett and the band (Jana König, ...) with was streamed on 10 July 2021, as in cooperation between Cinema and Tele 5
- No. 141 Hai-Alarm auf Mallorca: Katy Karrenbauer, German actress, a main actress in the original movie
- No. 148 Gib Gas – Ich will Spaß!: Peter Illmann, Markus Mörl, the main actor of the original movie
- No. 150 Tammy & the T-Rex: Live event in Berlin
- No. 160 Live event from the Cologne Comedy Festival
- No. 174 Der Gorilla von Soho: Wolfgang Bahro as Inspector in the opening scene
- No. 175 Der Clown: main actors Sven Martinek and Eva Haberman
- No. 185 Geisterjäger John Sinclair: Dubbing actor Dietmar Wunder for John Sinclair, Daniel Craig's James Bond and other.

== Commercial success ==
Even though Tele 5 is a small niche broadcaster, the SchleFaZ series is a commercial success. A short list of the average viewing figures shows there exists a fanbase even of the late Friday night airtime.

Date	Movie	Viewer	14–49	Source
2013-08-16	Piranhas II – Die Rache der Killerfische	.27 m (1.8%)	.18 m (2.8%)	
2013-08-23	Cherry 2000	.22 m (3.2%)	.16 m (2.4%)	
2013-10-18	Mega Piranha	.20 m (1.0%)	.10 m (1.3%)	
2014-01-10	Sharknado – Genug gesagt!	.47 m (2.3%)	.30 m (3.5%)	
2014-11-21	Sharknado – Genug gesagt! (movie only)	.51 m (1.6%)	? (2.0%)	
2014-11-21	Sharknado 2: The Second One	.41 m (2.1%)	.21 m (2.6%)	
2015-09-05	Sharknado 3	.50 m (2.5%)	.29 m (3.9%)	
2016-07-22	Arachnoquake	.32 m (1.7%)	.20 m (2.6%)	
2017-07-14	Avengers Grimm	.30 m (%)	.16 m (3.0%)	
2017-12-22	Mister Dynamit – Morgen küßt Euch der Tod	.28 m (1.5%)	.18 m (2.8%)	
2018-08-24	Die Todesgöttin des Liebescamps	.40 m (3.4%)	? (6.4%)	
2018-12-14	Der letzte Lude	.34 m (1.7%)	? (3.3%)	
2021-12-11	Ach jodel mir doch einen	.31 m (2.6%)	? (3.4%)	
2022-04-08	Grizzly 2	.30 m (1.5%)	.15 Mio (3.1%)	

== Trivia ==
- The series broadcast four world TV premieres (sign: ♠) till now (Jan. 2026):
  - Daniel - Der Zauberer
  - Sloane
  - Grizzly II
  - Tammy and the T-Rex
- Till now (January 2026) the worst rated movie on IMDb is Daniel – Der Zauberer (1.2) from 15'189 persons; the best rated movie is Zhōng Guó Chāo Rén (6.3) from 2437 people.
- There are 20 German movies in the list (10.9%).
- 16 movies have the word "shark" in the title.
- The Giant Claw is the oldest movie shown (1957), Shark Side of the Moon is the newest (2022).
- Most of the movies are rated by FSK 16 or 18, but some may also be seen by children:
  - FSK 0 – Spiceworld, Supersound und flotte Sprüche
  - FSK 6 – Xanadu, Musik, Musik – da wackelt die Penne, Libero, Daniel – Der Zauberer, Wenn die tollen Tanten kommen, Santa Claus, Im Dschungel ist der Teufel los, Trabbi goes to Hollywood, Rock Aliens, Gib Gas - Ich will Spaß!
- At least the movie Dawn of the Mummy is cut to get the FSK 16 approval, which makes it way more complicated to follow the storyline.
- German director Uwe Boll sent Tele 5 a video message on the occasion of the first season, thanking them for not showing any of his own films. After the first season, Boll suggested that his films would be presented in the programme, but Rütten and Kalkofe decided against it.
- Oliver Kalkofe stated in an interview by Peer Schader that the film Hercules in New York was in discussion for the programme, but was not permitted to be shown on TV because of Arnold Schwarzenegger's veto. On 8 May 2020, it was finally shown on Tele 5 after all, but as a warm-up film for Ator – Herr des Feuers in 2020-05-08.
- The HanseMerkur Versicherungsgruppe has sponsored the summer seasons of SchleFaZ since 2016. Simultaneously with the broadcast, their official Twitter account humorously provides an insurance perspective on aspects in the shown movie and answers the often not entirely serious questions of users. Since 2017, the HanseMerkur news spokesman (nicknamed Hansi Merkur by the community) has been answering individual user questions on TV and on Twitter.
