= Hot streak (disambiguation) =

A hot streak is a term used to describe a streak of repeated success, such as a winning streak, or a hitting streak. It may also refer to the following:

- Bruce Forsyth's Hot Streak, an American game show
- Hot Streak, an Australian game show
- Hotstreak, a fictional character and enemy of Static from DC Comics' Milestone Media imprint and the animated superhero TV series Static Shock
- Hot Streak (album), a 2015 music album by American rock band, The Winery Dogs
- "Hot Streak" (Hit the Floor), an episode from the 4th season of the American TV drama, Hit the Floor
- Hot Streak, a 1980s electro band known for their 1984 song, "Body Work" for the film Breakin'

== See also ==
- Cold streak
