= Hate Thy Neighbor =

1968 film

- Directed by: Ferdinando Baldi
- Written by: Luigi Angelo; Ferdinando Baldi; Roberto Natale
- Starring: Spiros Focás; George Eastman; Nicoletta Machiavelli; Ivy Holzer; Horst Frank
- Cinematography: Enzo Serafin
- Edited by: Antonietta Zita
- Music by: Robby Poitevin
- Release date: 1968
- Language: Italian

Hate Thy Neighbor (Italian: Odia il prossimo tuo, also known as Hate Your Neighbor) is a 1968 Italian Spaghetti Western film co-written and directed by Ferdinando Baldi.

== Plot ==
A frantic man is denied shelter in town. He is shot dead by the leader of the bandits who pursued him, after he gives the leader, Gary Stevens, a map. Gary crosses over the border into Mexico to join up with his partner, Chris Malone, an estate owner who has his slaves perform gladiatorial combat to the death to entertain him and his girlfriend. Gary divides his stolen map in two and gives half to Chris, the two halves combined show the location of a gold mine.

Meanwhile, the dead man's brother, Ken Dakota, arrives in town and starts asking questions.

Gary and his men rob a bank in town, but Chris has forewarned the authorities about it. Soldiers kill all of Gary's men and take him prisoner. When the soldiers are paid off and leave, Gary is left alone with Chris and his men (and also Chris's girlfriend), who torture him to get him to reveal where he has hidden his half of the map.

When Chris and his girlfriend leave the scene of the torture, Ken and his sidekick, Duke, shoot the men guarding Gary and free him. Ken forces Gary to give him his half of the map, which he does after they fight. Ken forcibly takes Gary to town, where he is tried and sentenced to be hanged in the morning.

That night when Ken returns to his room he is ambushed by Chris and his men. They beat Ken up, and the next morning they save Gary when he is about to be hanged. Gary tells Chris he no longer has the map.

Gary and some of Chris's men abduct Ken's nephew, intending to exchange him for the map in Ken's possession. Gary pays one of Chris's most trusted men, Jose, to betray him, so that he will end up with both halves of the map. However Chris anticipates their move, and he and his men take Gary and Jose prisoner.

Chris makes Gary and Jose fight a gladiatorial duel, Jose is about to kill Gary, but Ken shows up on the scene. He shoots Jose dead, and forces Chris to release the nephew. Ken then shoots Gary, who, when wounded, tells Ken he killed his brother under Chris's orders. Chris shoots Gary dead and demands the map from Ken.

A shootout follows, which Ken and Duke are able to win in part because they have hidden firepower in the form of explosives hidden in Duke's jacket. Chris takes flight on horseback, but Ken pursues him and shoots him in the chest. Ken is about to finish him off, but ultimately decides against it. Duke, arriving on the scene, tells Chris, with the last line of dialogue of the film: "You're really fortunate; you've finally met a man who doesn't know how to hate".

== Cast ==
- Spiros Focás (credited as Clyde Garner): Ken Dakota
- George Eastman: Gary Stevens
- Nicoletta Machiavelli: Peggy Savalas
- Ivy Holzer: Mrs. Malone
- Horst Frank: Chris Malone
- Roberto Risso: Duke
- Paolo Magalotti: Jose
- Franco Fantasia: Sheriff
- Claudio Castellani: Pat Dakota
- Ivan Scratuglia: Armendariz

== Trivia ==
The film was broadcast on Tele 5 as part of the programme format SchleFaZ in season 1.
