= Ruck Zuck (game show) =

German game show

- Genre: game show
- Presented by: Werner Schulze-Erdel (1988–1991); Jochen Bendel (1992–2000, 2004–2005); Matthias Euler-Rolle (2005); Oliver Geissen (2016–2017); Désirée Nosbusch (1992) (KRZ)
- Composers: Ray Ellis; Marc Ellis

Production
- Camera setup: Multi-Camera
- Production companies: Reg Grundy Productions (1988–2005); UFA Show & Factual

Original release
- Network: Tele 5 (1988–1992, 2004–2005); RTL II (1993–1995) tm3 (1996–2000); RTLplus (2016–2018)
- Release: (Tele 5); January 11, 1988 – December 31, 1992 (RTL II); September 6, 1993 – July 14, 1995 (tm3); January 20, 1997 – October 20, 2000 (Tele 5); October 25, 2004 – June 3, 2005 (RTLplus); October 17, 2016 – November 9, 2017

Ruck Zuck is the German version of the short-lived U.S. game show Bruce Forsyth's Hot Streak. It premiered on January 11, 1988, and ended on October 20, 2000 and four years later it came back to Tele 5 on October 25, 2004 and ended on June 3, 2005. Like its American counterpart, the series was packaged by Reg Grundy's Worldwide television empire. During its 1988–2000 and 2004–2005 run, Tele 5, RTL II and tm3 in its original incarnation, ran the show. The show was revived on RTLplus from October 17, 2016 to December 8, 2017.

Over time, the show had four hosts: Werner Schulze-Erdel (1988–1991), Jochen Bendel (1991–2000, 2004–2005), Matthias Euler-Rolle (2005) and Oliver Geissen (2016–2018), while Désirée Nosbusch hosted a short-lived kids version of Ruck Zuck on Tele 5 called Kinder Ruck Zuck in 1992.

== Rules ==
The game is played the same as its short-lived U.S. counterpart. Two teams of five players each, men vs. women competed. The leader of the team (which changes after every round), is given a choice of two words to choose from. The other team gets the unchosen word. The remaining players are wearing headphones that have music piped in them so they cannot hear what's going on. The object of the game is to describe the word to the next person in line, and then to the next person and so on. However, if at any time, a player describing the word, repeats a keyword or phrase that was already used to describe the word, their half of the round stops, and the scoring ends. For each successful transaction, the team scores points. The round lasts for 40 seconds.

=== Scoring ===
- First three rounds – 1 point
- Round 4 – 3 points

=== Tiebreaker ===
The team with the most points at the end of the game wins, and then goes on to play the bonus round for the big money. In the event of a tie at the end of the fourth round, a tiebreaker round is played. The champion is shown a word. The captain can either play or pass the word. The team that plays the word must describe it all the way down the line in order to win. Failure to do so awards the opponent the win.

== Bonus Round ==
In the bonus game, the host gave the team captain a word or phrase. The player gives the four words that the partners can think of associated with the word. While this is going on, the remaining teammates are wearing the headphones so they cannot hear just like in the main game. When that is all done, the players are brought out, and are given 20 seconds (five seconds per player) to say as many words as they can think of relating to the topic word, in hopes of saying the same words that the captain stated earlier. Each correct match wins the team money.

=== Scoring ===
- Round 1 – DM100 (DM50 from 1997, €25 from 2004, €50 as of 2016)
- Round 2 – DM200 (DM100 from 1997, €50 from 2004, €100 as of 2016)

In the last round, the team must say ALL four words that the captain said to win four times the money for a maximum total of DM4,800 (DM2,400 in 1997, €1,200 in 2004, €2,400 as of 2016). The winning team plays until defeated or has won six games. A team's sixth bonus round was played with only one word, with four correct answers winning the team DM25,000 (€12,782); this was later increased to DM100,000 (€51,128) on November 1, 1989, and then reduced to DM50,000 (€25,564) in 1997. With the euro, the top prize was €25,000 (later increased to €30,000 by the end of the last run).

== Kinder Ruck Zuck (Tele 5, 1992) ==
Due to the success of the show, producers decided to make a kid's version of Ruck Zuck called Kinder Ruck Zuck. This version was hosted by Désirée Nosbusch. It featured German kids as contestants. Other than that it was played the same way as the adult version except that the kids were playing for a trip to Euro Disneyland. The main difference was that in the bonus round, the designated captain wore headphones while each of his or her teammates gave one word that fit the category, and the captain then had to guess all four words in 15 seconds to win the trip for the team.

== Der Gameshow-Marathon (ProSieben, 2007) ==
On February 12, 2007, Ruck Zuck became one of several games on the German show called Der Gameshow-Marathon on ProSieben hosted by Oliver Pocher & Oliver Petszokat. In addition, former host Jochen Bendel made a brief appearance in the episode.

== 20 Jahre RTL II (RTL II, 2013) ==
On March 6, 2013, in conjunction with the anniversary of the channel called 20 Jahre RTL II (20 Years of RTL II) Ruck Zuck was revived as a one-time special with former host Jochen Bendel returning.

== Merchandise ==
A board game (sold in Germany only) was released by Mattel in 1990.
