= Bruce Forsyth's Hot Streak =

American television game show

- Genre: Game show
- Directed by: James Marcione
- Presented by: Bruce Forsyth
- Judges: Burt Wheeler
- Announcer: Gene Wood; Marc Summers
- Composers: Ray Ellis; Marc Ellis
- Country of origin: United States
- No. of episodes: 64

Production
- Executive producer: Robert Noah
- Producers: Pam Meerson; Roger Speakman (Development Producer); Caryn Lucas (Development Producer)
- Production locations: The Prospect Studios; Hollywood, California
- Camera setup: Multi-camera
- Running time: 25 minutes
- Production company: Reg Grundy Productions

Original release
- Network: ABC
- Release: January 6 – April 4, 1986

Bruce Forsyth's Hot Streak is an American television game show that aired on ABC from January 6 to April 4, 1986. British television personality Bruce Forsyth hosted the series, the only time he hosted a series outside of his native United Kingdom. Gene Wood and Marc Summers took turns as announcers each week.

The show originated as a 1983 pilot called Party Line, hosted by Gene Rayburn. The show was picked up with a few minor changes, mainly Forsyth replacing Rayburn as host and the show title changed.

Reg Grundy Productions produced Bruce Forsyth's Hot Streak, which was the first daytime series the Grundy company produced for a network other than NBC. It was also only Grundy's fourth series he attempted in America, after Scrabble, Time Machine, and daytime and syndicated editions of Sale of the Century. To that point, the daytime Sale and Scrabble had been hits while Time Machine and the syndicated Sale were relatively short lived.

Bruce Forsyth's Hot Streak was also the last American production for the Grundy Organisation to premiere until 1993.

== Gameplay ==
Two gender-specific teams of five contestants, one of which were returning champions, each competed in a game of word association. The challengers, or winners of a coin toss in the case of two new teams, played first. In round one, the captain of the team in control chose one of two words presented by the host. The other four team members wore headphones to ensure they could not hear the word. Once a word was chosen, the team was given 40 seconds to communicate the word down the line. The team captain described the word to the second team member, who, after guessing the word, then did the same for the third team member. The process continued down the line until the team completed the transition down the line, time ran out, the team gave an illegal clue, repeated a key word, gestured or said the word (or a form of the word). The opposing team played the other word in the round.

In the second round, the next players in line became the captains and the team trailing after round one chose the first word. In rounds one and two, each successful transition was worth $100, for a maximum of $400 per round. The third and final round started with the trailing team, and each correct transition was worth $200, for a possible $800. The maximum grand total for a game was $1,600.

The team with the most money won the game, kept their winnings, and advanced to the bonus round. The losing team received parting gifts, plus their previous winnings if they were returning champions. If the game ended in a tie, the captain of the champion team (or the captain of the team who lost the coin toss, if there were two new teams) was given one final word and opted to play or pass. The team that played the tie-breaker had to communicate the word down the line without faltering to win. If they were unable to do so, the other team won.

=== Bonus round ===
The bonus round involved the members of the winning team trying to come up with words to describe certain people, places, or things.

For each subject, Forsyth would show the team captain the subject while his/her teammates were placed in isolation with headphones so they could not hear. The captain then came up with four words that he/she thought best described the subject. Once the captain came up with those four words, the rest of the team came out of isolation and were told the subject. Each of the other four players was given five seconds to guess them (twenty seconds in all). Each time the team came up with a word, it was worth $200. After the twenty seconds was up, a second subject was played for $300 per correct guess. Finally, a third subject was played and if the team came up with all four words their winnings were multiplied by five, for a potential $10,000. If the team could not come up with all four words for the third subject, they kept what they had won in the first two parts of the round.

== Broadcast history ==
The show originated as an unsold pilot in 1983 hosted by Gene Rayburn called Party Line. The show was picked up by ABC with a few minor changes, mainly Forsyth replacing Rayburn as host (Rayburn had committed to Break the Bank by this time) and the show title changed from Party Line to Hot Streak. The game play for the most part remained unchanged. A pilot hosted by Forsyth was produced in 1984 with Rod Roddy serving as the announcer and in the Bonus Round the first two subjects were worth $300 per word and the third subject the team played for ten times the amount of the total money they won in the first two subjects for a potential $24,000.

Hot Streak was placed in ABC's 11:00 am Eastern/10:00 am Central time slot that was already home to two hit daytime game shows, CBS's The Price Is Right and NBC's Wheel of Fortune. Consequently, Hot Streak was routinely beaten in the ratings and came in a distant third to both shows and ABC decided not to renew the show when its thirteen-week order ended.

== International versions ==
| Country | Local name | Host | Network | Year Aired |
|---|---|---|---|---|
| Australia | Hot Streak | James O'Neill | Seven Network | February 23, 1998 – November 27, 1998 |
| Austria | Ruck Zuck | Jochen Bendel (2004–2005); Mathias Euler-Rolle (2005) | ATV+ | 2004–2005 |
| Belgium | Rap Klap | Anne De Baetzelier | VTM | 1990–1991 |
| France | Passe à ton voisin | Alexandre Pesle | France 2 | June 30, 1997 – September 5, 1997 |
| Germany | Ruck Zuck | Werner Schulze-Erdel (1988–1991); Jochen Bendel (1992–2000, 2004–2005); Mathias Euler-Rolle (2005); Oliver Geissen (2016–2018) | Tele 5 (1988–1992, 2004–2005); RTL II (1993–1995) tm3 (1995–2000); RTLplus (2016–2018) | 1988–2000; 2004–2005; 2016–2018 |
| Germany | Kinder Ruck Zuck | Désirée Nosbusch | Tele 5 | 1992 |
| Greece | Rouk Zouk | Mary Miliaresi | Mega Channel | 1994–1997 |
| Greece | Rouk Zouk | Zeta Makrypoulia | ANT1 | 2017–2026 |
| Indonesia | Komunikata | Isam Surentu (2000–2005); Indra Bekti (2005) | TPI | 2000–2005 |
| Indonesia | Komunikata Kapten Bintang | Isam Surentu | TPI | 2001 |
| Indonesia | Komunikata Junior | Isam Surentu | TPI | 2002 |
| Indonesia | Katakan Katamu | Ben Kasyafani | antv | 2010–2011 |
| Indonesia | Kata Bergaya | Sule and Rizky Febian; Uya Kuya (few final episodes) | antv | 2014–2015 |
| Indonesia | Komunikata Indonesia | Choky Sitohang (March–May 2018); John Martin Tumbel (May 2018–February 2019) | GTV | 2018–2019 |
| Israel | חמש ,חמש; Hamesh, Hamesh; 5/5 | | Channel 2 | 1993–1994 |
| Kazakhstan | Ποйми мeʜя Poymy Menya | | НТК | October 5, 2013 – May 28, 2015 |
| Poland | Podaj Dalej | Piotr Wiszniowski; Wiesław Tupaczewski | RTL7 | 1998; 2000–2001 |
| Russia | Ποйми мeʜя Poymy Menya | Oleg Marusev (1995–2000); Matvey Ganapolsky (1995); Eugene Dvorzhetsky (1999); Eugene Stychkin (1999–2000) | ORT; NTV | 1995–1996; 1996–2000 |
| Russia | Ποйми мeʜя Poymy Menya (Kids edition) | Olga Shelest | Karusel | September 8, 2013 – February 24, 2016 |
| Serbia | Zlatni Krug | Boris Milivojevic and Sofia Rajović | B92 | 2014–2016 |
