= The Food of the Gods (film) =

1976 science fiction thriller American film by Bert I. Gordon

H.G. Wells' The Food of the Gods
- Theatrical release poster by Drew Struzan
- Directed by: Bert I. Gordon
- Written by: Bert I. Gordon
- Produced by: Samuel Z. Arkoff; Bert I. Gordon
- Starring: Marjoe Gortner; Pamela Franklin; Ralph Meeker; Jon Cypher; Belinda Balaski; Tom Stovall; Ida Lupino
- Cinematography: Reginald H. Morris
- Edited by: Corky Ehlers
- Music by: Elliot Kaplan
- Distributed by: American International Pictures
- Release date: June 18, 1976
- Running time: 88 minutes
- Countries: United States; Canada
- Language: English
- Box office: $1 million

H.G. Wells' The Food of the Gods, also billed as just The Food of the Gods, is a 1976 American-Canadian horror thriller film released by American International Pictures and was written, produced and directed by Bert I. Gordon. Starring Marjoe Gortner, Pamela Franklin, Ralph Meeker, Jon Cypher, and Ida Lupino, the film was loosely based on a portion of the 1904 H. G. Wells novel The Food of the Gods and How It Came to Earth. The film reduced Wells' tale to a "nature revenge" plot, common in science fiction films of the time.

Michael Medved's book The Golden Turkey Awards named the film Worst Rodent Movie of All Time.

== Plot ==
The "food" mysteriously bubbles up from the ground on a remote island somewhere in British Columbia. Mr. and Mrs. Skinner consider it a gift from God, and feed it to their chickens, which grow larger than humans as a result. Rats, wasps, and grubs also consume the substance, and the island becomes infested with giant vermin. One night, a swarm of giant rats kill Mr. Skinner after his car tire is punctured in the forest.

A professional football player named Morgan is on the island for a hunting trip with his buddies when one of them is stung to death by giant wasps. After ferrying his friends back to the mainland, Morgan returns to investigate. Also thrown into the mix are Thomas and Rita, an expecting couple; Jack Bensington, the owner of a dog food company, who hopes to market the substance; and Bensington's assistant Lorna Scott, a bacteriologist. After Morgan locates and dynamites the giant wasps' enormous nest, he and the others become trapped in the Skinners' farmhouse, surrounded by giant rats. Morgan's friend Brian, Bensington, and Mrs. Skinner are killed by the rats.

Morgan blows up a nearby dam, flooding the area and drowning the rats, whose size and weight render them unable to swim. After the waters clear, the survivors pile up the bodies of the rats, spilling the jars of "F.O.T.G." and gasoline on them before burning them. However, several of Mrs. Skinner's jars of "F.O.T.G." are swept away, drifting to a mainland farm. The substance is consumed by dairy cows, and in the film's closing scene, schoolchildren are shown unwittingly drinking the tainted milk, implying that they will also experience abnormal growth.

== Cast ==
- Marjoe Gortner as Morgan
- Pamela Franklin as Lorna Scott
- Ralph Meeker as Jack Bensington
- Jon Cypher as Brian
- Ida Lupino as Mrs. Skinner
- Belinda Balaski as Rita
- Tom Stovall as Thomas
- John McLiam as Mr. Skinner
- Chuck Courtney as Davis
- Reg Tunnicliffe as ferry attendant

== Production ==
Joseph E. Levine first purchased the film rights to H. G. Wells' novella The Food of the Gods and How It Came to Earth (1904) in 1965 and hired Bert I. Gordon to direct and produce a partial adaptation of it as Village of the Giants (1965) at his studio Embassy Pictures. Nine years later, American International Pictures announced another partial adaptation of the novella directed and co-produced again by Gordon.

Production of the film began with special effects shots in Montreal in November 1974. Gordon created a special effects process that would create the illusion of humans interacting with massive animals by splicing together footage of animals shot by second-unit crews. Special effects designer Thomas R. Burman created rat costumes that allowed for the giant rats in the film to be played by child actors, including his own son. The rest of the film was shot on location in Bowen Island, British Columbia. Shooting was delayed by two minor earthquake and a blizzard. The film had a $900,000 budget.

The plot of the movie differs from Wells' novella in that the "food" is a man-made substance in the novella and the action takes place in England, not British Columbia.

It was Pamela Franklin's last film, although she made television appearances for another five years, before retiring from acting altogether in 1981.

== Release ==
The film premiered on June 18, 1976 in the United States. Scream Factory released the film for first time on Blu-ray on May 26, 2015 as a double feature with Frogs.

== Reception ==
The movie was AIP's most successful release of the year, causing them to make a series of films based on H. G. Wells novels.

Roger Ebert of the Chicago Sun-Times gave the film one star out of four. Vincent Canby of The New York Times called the film "a stunningly ridiculous mixture of science-fiction and horror-film clichés." Gene Siskel of the Chicago Tribune gave the film half of one star out of four and wrote, "The heavy television ad campaign promises six-foot roosters and panther-sized rats. What it should promise, if truth-in-labeling applied to film ads, is rotten special effects and a laughable script." Arthur D. Murphy of Variety wrote, "Too much emphasis by Gordon on his good special visual effects combines with too little attention to his writing chores ... Every player has done better before; this script is atrocious." Kevin Thomas of the Los Angeles Times wrote that "the entire picture is a joke—unintentionally." Tom Milne of The Monthly Film Bulletin called it "A truly appalling piece of s-f horror in which the cretinous dialogue, hopefully illuminating the follies of human greed and tampering with nature, poses more of a hazard to the cast than the crudely animated giant wasps or the monster rat and cockerel heads stiffly manipulated from the wings."

The Food of the Gods was nominated for the Best Horror Film by the Academy of Science Fiction, Fantasy and Horror Films in the 4th Saturn Awards in 1976. It has a score of 18% at Rotten Tomatoes from 17 reviewers, with an average score of 3.5/10. The German movie satire show Die schlechtesten Filme aller Zeiten ("The Worst Movies of All Time") showed the movie on TV in 2018.

== Sequel ==
A sequel — if only in name — titled Food of the Gods II was released in 1989.
