= Musicbox (German TV channel) =

musicbox
- Country: West Germany
- Broadcast area: West Germany
- Headquarters: Munich, Germany

Programming
- Language(s): German

Ownership
- Owner: Kabel-Media-Programmgesellschaft mbH

History
- Launched: 1 January 1984; 41 years ago
- Closed: 11 January 1988; 37 years ago
- Replaced by: Tele 5

musicbox was the first German music channel on television. It was launched in 1984, first via the cable pilot project and then as a nationwide television channel. In 1988 the station was converted into Tele 5.

== History ==
Musicbox broadcast a 24-hour program with video clips and music broadcasts. The station was located in Munich's Schellingstraße. Musicbox was the first German music station in the cable pilot project of Ludwigshafen to be launched on 1 January 1984 alongside Sat.1 (formerly PKS), the ZDF Musikkanal and other channels, and could only be received there. Musicbox was founded by Wolfgang Fischer, program director was Jochen Kröhne. The programme was later broadcast nationwide by cable and satellite (Intelsat VA F-12 (60.0°East)), in Munich at times even via antenna.

The transmissions had a high editorial information portion, it gave to nearly each popular music direction its own transmission. In the beginning the daily transmission time was from 8:00 to 24:00 o'clock, which was then later extended to a 24-hour program. While during the day moderated music magazines dominated, at night often videos were sent non-stop or repetitions of the transmissions of the day.

In 1988, due to changes in the shareholder structure of the music channel, it was converted into a generalist channel called Tele 5. The Italian media mogul Silvio Berlusconi had purchased a 45 percent stake in the production company. On January 11, 1988 at 0:00 a.m, the name was changed into Tele 5 during the live show Tschau musicbox - Hallo Tele 5, hosted by Werner Schulze-Erdel. But music also played a major role in the early days of Tele 5. Some programmes and presenters from Musicbox were included in the Tele 5 programme. Musicbox founder Wolfgang Fischer acquired a 10 percent stake in Tele 5, while Silvio Berlusconi and Herbert Kloiber each held 45 percent of the other shares in Tele 5.

The former music editorial office had become independent after the conversion into Tele 5. The production company MME - Me, Myself & Eye Entertainment was founded, which took over the entire music video archive. To this day, MME produces various music and entertainment programmes for almost all well-known German television stations. The music channel VH-1 Germany, founded in 1995, was also supplied with former musicbox videos.
