= 9Live =

German TV channel

- Country: Germany
- Broadcast area: Germany, Austria, Switzerland
- Headquarters: Unterföhring, Germany

Programming
- Language: German
- Picture format: 576i (4:3 SDTV)

Ownership
- Owner: ProSiebenSat.1 Media

History
- Launched: 1 September 2001; 24 years ago
- Replaced: tm3
- Closed: 9 August 2011; 14 years ago

Links
- Website: www.9live.de

9Live was a commercial German participation TV channel launched on 1 September 2001 and lasted until 9 August 2011. It originated from a channel called tm3. Most of its programming is lottery and quiz games, in which the viewer can participate over the phone. There were also talent formats like FLASH. Host Ricky Harris led through the show.

== International versions ==
A British version of 9Live was broadcast in 2004 on entertainment channel E4 from 10am to 2pm.
