= Hot Streak =

- Genre: Game Show
- Based on: Bruce Forsyth's Hot Streak
- Presented by: James O'Neil
- Narrated by: Ron E Sparks
- Country of origin: Australia
- Original language: English
- No. of seasons: 1

Production
- Running time: 30 minutes
- Production company: Grundy Television

Original release
- Network: Seven Network
- Release: 23 February – 27 November 1998

Hot Streak is an Australian afternoon game show aired on the Seven Network in 1998, hosted by James O'Neil. This show was based on the short-lived 1986 America format called Bruce Forsyth's Hot Streak, Two teams of five contestants (one consisting of men, the other, of women) compete in a battle of the sexes game of word association for a chance to win up to $50,000. The show took over the time slot of the game show Concentration.

On the Australian Hot Streak, each correct transition down the line in the first two rounds scored $5, while each transition in the third round scored $10. On later episodes, teams scored $5 per transition in the first three rounds and $15 apiece in the fourth round.

The winning team played the same bonus game as the American version except that each correct word mentioned on the first subject would be worth the same amount won earlier. The amount won in round one would be multiplied by the number of correct words mentioned in part two. The team's winnings from part two would be multiplied by five if the team succeeded in part three. Five-time championship teams played only one subject for a grand total of $50,000.

Hot Streak was cancelled in November 1998 citing lower-than-expected ratings after its first year on air.

== Reception ==
In a negative review that compared Hot Streak with the Ten game show Battle of the Sexes, The Sydney Morning Herald columnist Tony Squires wrote, "One thing is certain - it's far more compelling than Hot Streak on Seven, where teams of men and women play the same parlour game over and over again. It's worth watching, though, if only to hear the host try to explain the 'second chance' rule, where losers get to come back and lose some more. Oh, it's also worth checking out the dancing when contestants don the headphones so they can't hear what's happening in the studio."
