= Tele 5 =

German television channel

TELE 5
- Country: Germany
- Broadcast area: Germany
- Headquarters: Grünwald, Germany

Programming
- Picture format: 1080i HDTV (downscaled to 16:9 576i for the SDTV feed)

Ownership
- Owner: Warner Bros. Discovery EMEA
- Parent: Warner Bros. Discovery International

History
- Launched: January 11, 1988 (original); April 28, 2002 (revival)
- Replaced: musicbox (1984–1988)
- Closed: December 31, 1992 (original)
- Replaced by: DSF (original)

Links
- Website: www.tele5.de

Availability

Terrestrial
- Digital terrestrial television: Channel slots vary on each region (HD)

Streaming media
- tele5.de: Watch live

TELE 5 is a German free-to-air television channel that primarily broadcasts classic American films, science fiction series and anime. It is owned by Warner Bros. Discovery EMEA, which is a subsidiary of Warner Bros. Discovery International.

== History ==
Logo of Tele5 used until mid-1992, after the channel was bought by Leo Kirch and scheduled for closure. On air, the white parts were transparent and the red parts were solid white

Tele 5 replaced Germany's second music television channel, Musicbox, which existed from 1984 to 1988. Prior to 1987, Silvio Berlusconi bought part of Musicbox and rebranded it as Tele5 on 11 January 1988. Its programming was produced in the same building as Musicbox, a music video show named Musicbox remained part of Tele5's regular schedule, and several Musicbox show hosts transferred to Tele5. From 1988 to 1992, Tele5 was part of Berlusconi's Europe-wide network of sister channels, all with the number 5 in their names and a stylized flower in their logo, which included Canale 5 in Italy, Telecinco in Spain (originally also styled as Tele5), and La Cinq in France (which was later replaced by France 5). Tele5 timeshared with RTL Television (then RTLplus) on terrestrial television from 8:00am or 9:00am to 5:00pm, and at night.

During the channel's four-year lifespan, its children's programming in particular increasingly took market share from Leo Kirch's German television networks, which prompted Kirch to buy the channel in 1992, and rebrand it DSF (Deutsches Sportfernsehen, German Sport Television) on January 1, 1993 (Berlusconi's Europe-wide network would be later reborn as MFE - MediaForEurope, after buying Kirch's former networks, known as ProSiebenSat.1 Media).

=== Bim Bam Bino ===
Bim Bam Bino was the name of a children's show. A mouse called Bino served as "announcer" between the different TV series often consisting of animated shows, including He-Man and the Masters of the Universe, Bobobobs, The Raccoons, Filmation Ghostbusters, Around the World with Willy Fog, The Adventures of Teddy Ruxpin, Alvin and the Chipmunks, The Smurfs, Fantastic Max, Grimm's Fairy Tale Classics, Saber Rider, Queen Millennia, Captain Future, or Anne of Green Gables.

At the time, most other channels had a few weekly or daily series for children. Some channels had "Double Features". Bim Bam Bino was the first big all-week program block for children and teens on German television. Initially broadcast in the morning hours, the show soon grew to encompass afternoons and eventually even early evenings. At the time the channel went off-air, Bim Bam Bino made up the biggest part of Tele 5's schedule and ran from about 9 AM, to 6 or 7PM.

=== Legacy shows ===
Some shows which had their German premiere on Tele5's first incarnation went on to find a new home. Bim Bam Bino was taken up by kabel eins, while the original Bim Bam Bino crew went on to produce a similar children's programming puppet announcer show, "Vampy" on RTL II. Many cartoon shows previously broadcast on Tele5 as part of Bim Bam Bino initially reappeared on the Kabel 1 version of Bim Bam Bino, and on RTL II's Vampy.

Bitte Lächeln (a format based upon America's Funniest Home Videos) was the only Tele5 show that was briefly taken up by its successor DSF before moving on to RTL II, and later ran under the new title Schwupps - Die Pannenshow on Tm3, and which was hosted by Mike Carl for its entire run across all three channels. By the time Bitte Lächeln aka Schwupps had moved to Tm3, a few of the cartoon shows originally on Tele5 were also taken up by Tm3 for its morning slots.

The most successful survivor of the old Tele5 was the game show Ruck Zuck (based on Bruce Forsyth's Hot Streak), which remained in production for over a decade on various channels after the closure of the old Tele5, appearing on RTL II, tm3, and even the new Tele 5 (see below).

== Relaunch ==
In April 2002, Tele München Gruppe relaunched the channel, now centred on movies and entertainment. Tele 5's second incarnation originally started with Jochen Kröhne as CEO, who had been program director of Musicbox (1984-1988) as well as of Tele5's original incarnation (1988-1992). Kröhne left the new Tele 5 in 2005 and was replaced as CEO by Kai Blasberg. Jochen Bendel, a host on the original Tele5, appeared on the channel from the beginning, including by hosting new editions of the game show Ruck Zuck, until he left the network in 2005.

The channel was sold from Leonine Holding to Discovery Inc. in 2020. At the end of 2023, the last in-house produced series, "The Worst Films of All Time" ("Schlefaz"), came to an end. According to Oliver Kalkofe, the reason was the almost complete elimination of the remaining jobs by Discovery Germany. The entire Discovery Germany channel group then had only two employees left, and at Tele 5, there was literally "no one there anymore"—they were simply broadcasting films. Broadcasting via freenet-TV was discontinued in spring 2024.

== Logos ==
Third logo, summer 1992

2005-2010

Alternate 2005-2010

Logo 2010-2013

HD logo until 2017

The 5 monogram

Logo 2017-2019

HD logo, 2017-2019

Logo 2019–2021

Logo 2021–present

HD logo, 2021–present

== Programming ==
The channel offers various types of programming.

=== Shows ===
- Kalkofes Mattscheibe Rekalked (2012–2021)
- Die schlechtesten Filme aller Zeiten (2013–2023)
- Der Klügere kippt nach – talk show, with Hugo Egon Balder and Hella von Sinnen
- Frau Dingens will zum Fernsehen
- Playlist – Sound of my Life
- Höggschde Konzentration – with Dominik Kuhn
- Ruck Zuck (2004–2005)
- Nachtfalke (2003–2005) – late night show
- Who wants to fuck my girlfriend? – game show/satire, with Christian Ulmen
- Vor Tele 5 (newscasts)

=== Current Series ===
- Battlestar Galactica (2013–present)
- Blood Ties (Blood Ties - Biss aufs Blut) (2017–present)
- Dark Matter (2017–present)
- Sharknado (2014–present)
- Star Trek: Deep Space Nine (2012–present)
- Star Trek: The Next Generation (2011–present)
- Star Trek: The Original Series (2016–present)
- Star Trek: Voyager (2012–present)
- Stargate Atlantis (2011-2012, 2014, 2016–present)

=== Former Series ===
- 21 Jump Street (21 Jump Street - Tatort Klassenzimmer) (2002-2005)
- Akte X (The X-Files) (2010-2012)
- Andromeda (2006-2013)
- Babylon 5 (2010-2015)
- Boy Machine (2017)
- Caprica (2014-2015)
- Defiance (2014-2015)
- Earth: Final Conflict (2007-2011)
- Eine himmlische Familie (7th Heaven) (2012)
- Extralarge (Zwei Supertypen in Miami) (2003, 2005, 2007-2009, 2013-2014, 2017)
- Firefly (2016-2017)
- Lucha Underground (2017–2019)
- Schönheit hat ihren Preis (Nip/Tuck) (2009-2010)
- NTSF:SD:SUV:: (2015-2016)
- Pretender (2006-2010)
- Prime Suspect (Heißer Verdacht) (2007-2008, 2010-2011)
- Smallville (2010-2013)
- Star Trek: Enterprise (2013-2015)
- Stargate Atlantis (2011-2012, 2014, 2016–present)
- Stargate SG-1 (2005-2017)
- Stargate Universe (2014-2015, 2017)
- The Bold and the Beautiful (Reich und Schön) (1988-1990, 2002, 2012-2016)
- The Love Boat (Love Boat) (1992)
- Walker, Texas Ranger (2009-2012)
- Xena (2013-2016)

=== Anime ===
- Attack No. 1 (Mila Superstar)
- Black Lagoon
- Captain Tsubasa (Die tollen Superstars)
- Crush Gear Turbo
- Digimon (2005, 2011, 2017)
- Dragon Ball Z
- Guilty Crown
- Mobile Suit Gundam Wing
- One Piece
- Sailor Moon
- Yu-Gi-Oh! Duel Monsters

== Austrian feed ==
An Austrian feed of Tele5 started broadcasting on May 1, 2012. It is a simulcast of the main channel with localised advertising, handled by the Austrian channel ATV which acts as the advertising sales representative; in turn ATV airs promotions for the latter.

== HD feed ==
Tele 5 HD

Since October 19, 2011, Tele 5 broadcasts in HD on HD+, a satellite television platform owned by SES-Astra. Like most channels in Europe broadcasting in HD, its SD feed is a downscaled version of its main high-definition programming. Tele5 HD is also distributed in Vodafone and Telekom Entertain.
