= Sloane (film) =

1984 film

Sloane is a 1985 action film starring Robert Resnik as "Philip Sloane," a martial arts instructor who fights kidnappers and cannibal pygmies in the Philippines. It also stars Debra Blee.
