= Blue Lagoon (cocktail) =

Alcoholic mixed drink

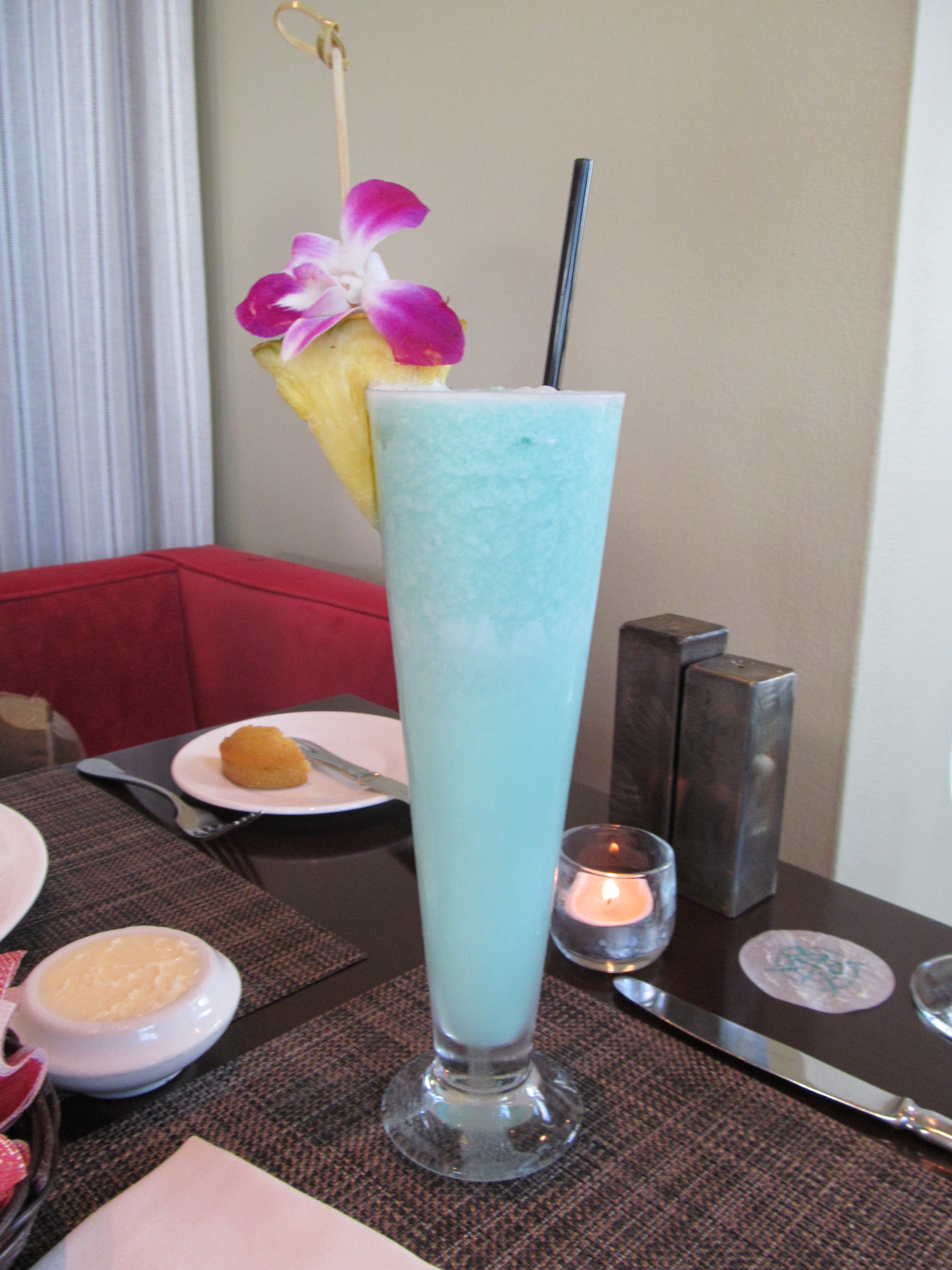
- Blue Lagoon at the Mandarin Oriental Washington
- Type: Mixed drink
- Ingredients: 50 ml (1.7 US fl oz) Vodka; 20 ml (0.68 US fl oz) Blue Curaçao; 100 ml (3.4 US fl oz) Lemonade; 1 orange slice; Ice cubes
- Standard drinkware: Hurricane glass
- Standard garnish: lemon slice or Garnish the brim with an orange slice or cherry and lemon wedge
- Served: On the rocks: poured over ice
- Preparation: Pour vodka and Blue Curaçao in a shaker with ice, shake well and strain into ice filled highball glass, top with lemonade, garnish and serve.

The Blue Lagoon is a French cocktail featuring blue Curaçao mixed with vodka and lemonade. It is typically garnished with an orange slice or a lemon slice. A Blue Lagoon is typically served in a hurricane glass.

Harry's New York Bar in Paris claims to have invented the drink.

One variation adds a dash of lime cordial to the mix. Another variation with a dash of raspberry cordial or grenadine is known as a "fruit tingle", after the Australian candy of that name.

In Denmark, the drink is known as an "Isbjørn" (polar bear).

== See also ==
- List of cocktails
