= Tm3 =

tm3
- Country: Germany
- Broadcast area: Germany, Austria, Switzerland
- Headquarters: Augsburg, Germany

Programming
- Language: German
- Picture format: 576i (16:9 SDTV)

Ownership
- Owner: ProSiebenSat.1 Media (1995-2001); FBT Deutschland GmbH (2019)
- Sister channels: tm3+

History
- Launched: 25 August 1995; 31 years ago (original); 13 January 2019; 7 years ago (revival)
- Replaced: 9Live; Family TV (2009-2019)
- Closed: 31 August 2001; 25 years ago (original); 1 April 2019; 7 years ago (revival)
- Replaced by: Genius family

Links
- Website: www.tm3.tv

tm3 was a German free-to-air television network. On 1 September 2001, it was rebranded as 9Live, which eventually closed down on 9 August 2011. TM3 was revived on 13 January 2019 replacing Family TV. On 31 March, Genius Family replaced Tm3.

TM3 launched as an original network on 25 August 1995 as a channel with programming focusing on women, fashion shows, & daily lifestyle. It had its headquarters in Munich.

== Program ==
First Logo from 1995-2001.

In October 1999, a request for the following thematic channels to the Bayerische Landeszentrale für neue Medien (Bavarian State Office for New Media) was approved:

- tm3 - Life & living: Dream Garden
- tm3 - Life & Living: Nice Ambient
- tm3 - Life & Living: Enjoy Healthy
- tm3 - Life & Living: Type Specific Style
- tm3 - Sport
- tm3 - Cinema fun
- tm3 - The Before and After Show (with Gundis Zámbó)
- tm3 – Lanotte; which was continued in 9Live

In the same year, the former "Women’s Channel" purchased the broadcasting rights for the UEFA Champions League, for DM 850 million, for four years, and broadcast live for one season before it was sold to RTL and Premiere in 2000.

Early 2001 was the start of tm3 travel show, urlaubsreif, which was renamed that same year to sonnenklar. Through the concept of this show, the channel sonnenklar.TV was founded in 2003. It was also broadcast on 9Live.

== Restructuring ==
News Corporation took over the station between 1999 and 2000, and transformed it into the "Champions League Station". The interest diminished in 2001, and the station was taken over by H.O.T Networks GmbH and ProSiebenSat.1 Media.

As of April 23, 2001 tm3 launched, under the slogan "as real as life", an interactive live entertainment (13 hours a day), which paved the way for the developing 9Live station.

== Audience share ==
	January	February	March	April	May	June	July	August	September	October	November	December	Annual average
1997	-	-	-	-	-	-	-	-	-	-	-	-	0.3%
1998	-	-	-	0.6%	0.6%	0.6%	0.6%	0.6%	0.7%	0.7%	0.7%	0.6%	▲0.6%
1999	0.7%	0.6%	0.6%	0.7%	0.8%	0.8%	0.8%	0.7%	1.9%	1.5%	1.5%	1.1%	▲1.0%
2000	0.8%	1.0%	1.5%	1.4%	1.4%	0.8%	0.9%	0.8%	0.8%	0.7%	0.7%	0.7%	1.0%
2001	0.7%	0.8%	0.7%	0.7%	0.4%	0.4%	0.3%	0.3%	-	-	-	-	▼0.5%
