= 6 Guns =

2010 DtV film

- DVD cover
- Directed by: Shane Van Dyke
- Written by: Geoff Meed
- Produced by: David Michael Latt; David Rimawi; Paul Bales
- Starring: Barry Van Dyke; Greg Evigan; Sage Mears; Brian Wimmer; Shane Van Dyke
- Cinematography: Alexander Yellen
- Music by: Chris Ridenhour
- Distributed by: The Asylum
- Release date: March 30, 2010
- Running time: 95 minutes
- Country: United States
- Language: English
- Budget: $100,000

6 Guns is a 2010 American Western direct-to-video film distributed by The Asylum and directed by Shane Van Dyke.

== Premise ==
To exact revenge on the men who killed her family and raped her, Selina Stevens (Sage Mears) enlists bounty hunter Frank Allison (Barry Van Dyke), to teach her the art of gunfighting.

== Cast ==
- Barry Van Dyke as Frank Allison
- Sage Mears as Selina Stevens
- Greg Evigan as Sheriff Barr
- Brian Wimmer as Will Stevens
- Geoff Meed as Lee Horn
- Shane Van Dyke as Chris Beall
- Carey Van Dyke as Joe Beall
- Jason Ellefson as Tommy Kleiber
- Jonathan Nation as Henry
- Erin Marie Hogan as Scarlet
- Tom Troutman as Snake Dancer
