= Transmorphers: Fall of Man =

2009 film

- Film poster
- Directed by: Scott Wheeler
- Written by: Shane Van Dyke
- Produced by: David Michael Latt; David Rimawi; Paul Bales
- Starring: Bruce Boxleitner; Jennifer Rubin; Shane Van Dyke; Alana DiMaria; Chad Vigil; Jack Goldenberg
- Cinematography: Mark Atkins
- Production company: The Asylum
- Distributed by: The Asylum
- Release date: June 30, 2009
- Running time: 90 minutes
- Country: United States
- Language: English

Transmorphers: Fall of Man (also known as Transmorphers II) is a 2009 American science fiction film directed by Scott Wheeler and produced by The Asylum, It is a prequel to the 2007 film Transmorphers.

As the title suggests, this film is a mockbuster of Transformers: Revenge of the Fallen. The plot, however, borrows from the 2007 Transformers film, Terminator 3: Rise of the Machines, and Maximum Overdrive. Unlike Transformers, the film was released directly to DVD with an R-rating in the United States and a 15 rating in the United Kingdom.

== Plot ==
Taking place 300 years prior to the events of the first film in the then-present-day 2009, the narrator describes how the government knew what was happening. A woman is seen driving recklessly on a California highway while arguing over her cell phone. Police officer Ryan Hadley pulls her over and gives her a warning. The man calls her back, but she tells him off and throws the phone down; the phone then transmorphs into a robotic spider that attacks and kills her.

At Edwards Air Force Base, an NSA officer informs her superior about intercepting a signal. In Los Angeles, Jo Summers is shocked to read in the newspaper about of the death of the woman from the car. In the Kern County Morgue, the police are baffled by the wound that killed the driver. Madison arrives home to discover her television is out. A repairman is called to fix the television. It ends up being Jake, the afformentoned narrator, an old friend of Madison, who hasn't seen her since returning from military deployment. Jake investigates her satellite dish and is shocked when it transmorphs into a robot. He runs inside to warn Madison, but when he goes back outside, the robot is gone. Summers meets up with Hadley to investigate the death of the driver, but the NSA show up and asks her to go with them. She advises Hadley to find the driver's missing phone.

A man is driving an SUV when his GPS gives him a five seconds warning to exit the vehicle, before shooting him in the forehead with a laser. Ryan meets with Madison and Jake and hears their story. He takes them in his car to look for the cell phone, but he is called to the scene of the SUV driver's body. A young boy tells Hadley that the SUV dumped the body and drove away by itself. Hadley picks up the first driver's cellular phone from the coroner's office. He then intercepts the SUV, which tries to ram him. When Ryan pulls the SUV over, they are jumped by the satellite robot. They drive away, but are chased by the SUV, who also transmorphs into a robot.

The machines quickly seize control of the Earth. After surviving an assault which kills Hadley, a small group learn that aliens are changing the water and the atmosphere to fit their physiology. They hear about this from a soldier who claims that this information came from Russia, where they captured and tortured one of the machines. They manage to salvage explosives and destroy one of the terraforming devices. This has a negative effect, though: the release of toxic chemicals into the atmosphere, to which the machines have adapted, and Jake sends a signal to other surviving humans, who have taken refuge underground, directing them to join him.

== Cast ==
- Bruce Boxleitner as Sheriff Hadley Ryan
- Jennifer Rubin as Dr. Jo Summers
- Shane Van Dyke as Jake Van Ryberg
- Alana DiMaria as Madison Ryan
- Silvy Kas as Officer Stevens
- Debra Harrison-Lowe as Mary Jo
- Amy Van Horne as Liz
- Benjamin W. Smith as Guard
- Vana O'Brian as Grandma
- Jay Beyers as Rocker Dude
- Jason Yorrick as Drake
- Londale Theus as Mayor Ethan Holt
- Iona Thonger as Dr. Collins
- Dana DiMatteo as Lucius
- Hiram Gonzalez as Clay
- Dean Kreyling as Hank
- Cole Protzman as Jeffrey
- Chad Vigil as Tommy
- Aidan Bristow as Commander
- D.T. Carney as Airplane Mechanic
- Corinne Dutra as Pacemaker
- Jack Goldenberg as Sergeant Monroe

== Production ==
Transmorphers: Fall of Man was released June 30, 2009 (less than a week after the premiere of Transformers: Revenge of the Fallen).

Scott Wheeler directs the film, replacing Transmorphers director Leigh Scott, and the film was also The Asylum's first film to be released on Blu-ray.

== Reception ==
Transmorphers: Fall of Man was met with a mixed critical reaction, and a considerably favorable one to its predecessor. Felix Vasquez Jr. of Cinema Crazed, who gave the original Transmorphers a positive review, said, "There are moments when Transmorphers 2 rises to the occasion and injects a sense of urgency to the proceedings, but it takes too long for anything to happen. It's one long stretch of boring with a few hits of excitement, but the cons drastically affect the pros."

== Future ==
=== Sequel ===
A third film in the series, Transmorphers: Mech Beasts, was released on June 30, 2023. It is a mockbuster of Transformers: Rise of the Beasts.

=== Spinoff ===
One of the Transmorphers appears in 2025 Armageddon, a 2022 film released to celebrate The Asylum's twenty-fifth anniversary. In this film, aliens send waves of monsters from Asylum films to attack Earth; a Transmorpher is sent alongside an Armada Suit in one of the first waves, but is destroyed when humans seize control of the latter to battle it.

== See also ==
- Transmorphers - The predecessor, by The Asylum
- The Day the Earth Stopped - Another alien invasion film by The Asylum
