= 12/12/12 (film) =

- Film poster
- Directed by: Jared Cohn
- Written by: Jared Cohn
- Produced by: David Michael Latt; Paul Bales
- Starring: Sara Malakul Lane; Jesus Guevara; Erin O'Brien; Steve Hanks; Carl Donelson
- Cinematography: Ben Demaree
- Edited by: Andre Law
- Music by: Graham Denman
- Production company: The Asylum
- Distributed by: The Asylum; Peacock Films; Schröder Media
- Release date: December 4, 2012 (DVD)
- Running time: 86 minutes
- Country: United States
- Language: English

12/12/12 (also known as Evil Born) is a 2012 American horror film written and directed by Jared Cohn. It stars Sara Malakul Lane, Jesus Guevara, Erin O'Brien, Steve Hanks, and Carl Donelson. It was filmed in Los Angeles, California and released on December 4, 2012.

== Plot ==
The film begins with a baby, Sebastian, being born. After Sebastian viciously murders the doctors who delivered him, his mother (Sara Malakul Lane) realizes that there is something seriously wrong with the child. Over the course of the film, Sebastian brutally murders many people and tragedy strikes many others. Mahari (Jesus Guevara) attempts to steal the baby from Sebastian's birth parents many times, and eventually does. He kidnaps Sebastian in order to follow his dark destiny. Police officers attempt to kill Mahari, but Mahari and his companions use Sebastian to murder them. The film ends with all the main characters dead, and their deaths were associated in some way to Sebastian.

== Cast ==
- Sara Malakul Lane as Veronica Alvarez
- Jesus Guevara as Mahari
- Erin O'Brien as Nurse At Station
- Steve Hanks as Detective Barnes
- Carl Donelson as Carlos
- Laura Ramos as Gabriella
- Samantha Stewart as Officer Vokel
- Rachel Alig as Katherine
- Jared Cohn as Jared
- Katy-Ann Thompson as Nurse Madysson
- Gregory Niebel as Dr. Ulf
- Shakira Ja'nai Paye as Kayla
- Shauna Chin as Barbara
- Jourdan Lee as Jason Tremmel
- Jon Kondelik as Trevor
- Samuel Fisher as Officer Kemp
- Sam Ingraffia as Father Anders

== Reception ==
Dread Central called it an "Omen-esque horror flick titled after the date on which its hellspawn will be born". Filming the project created controversy in Thailand, in which set photos showing Sara Malakul Lane in costume looking as if pregnant were mistakenly thought to be real, for there are cultural taboos there about unwed motherhood.

== Music ==
12/12/12 features a musical score composed by Graham Denman.

== See also ==
- 11/11/11 (film)
- 13/13/13 (film)
