= Jared Cohn =

American film director

Jared Michael Cohn
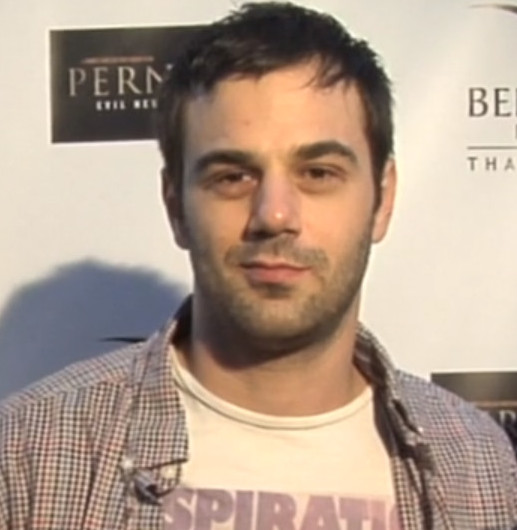
- Born: New York City, New York
- Other names: Jared Michaels; J. Cohn; Jared M. Cohn
- Education: New York Institute of Technology
- Occupations: Film actor; Television actor; Film director; Screenwriter; Film producer
- Years active: 2004–present
- Known for: Buddy Hutchins; Atlantic Rim; Born Bad

Jared Michael Cohn (also credited as Jared Michaels) is an American film director, screenwriter, and actor, best known for directing Buddy Hutchins. He has also directed films for The Asylum, including Atlantic Rim and Born Bad.

== Background ==
Cohn is a writer, director, producer, and actor born in New York, and graduated from the New York Institute of Technology with a Bachelor of Fine Arts degree in communication arts. His major was film production and post-production. He is a photographer, editor, and After Effects user, as well as a black belt in Shaolin Kempo Karate, a professional paintball player, and a certified scuba diver. He and his body of work have received media coverage. He currently lives in Los Angeles, California.

== Career ==
In 2011, Cohn wrote and directed Lifetime Channel's number one summer hit, Born Bad, a psychological thriller starring Meredith Monroe (Dawson’s Creek, Criminal Minds) and Michael Welch (the Twilight saga). In 2012, he premiered his first theatrical release, Hold Your Breath, which he directed. The same year, he wrote and directed Bikini Spring Break, starring Robert Carradine (Revenge of the Nerds), and the horror-thriller 12/12/12.

In 2013, Cohn directed From the Sea (released as Atlantic Rim), starring Graham Greene (Dances with Wolves, Defiance) and David Chokachi (Witchblade, Baywatch). He also wrote and directed the women-in-prison drama Jailbait and had a featured role in the independent horror-thriller Feed the Devil, which was shot on 35mm film.

=== Filmography ===
==== Actor ====
- Diary of an Affair (1 episode, 2004) as Andrew
- Legion of the Dead (2005) as Petrie
- Alien Abduction (2005) as Private Smalls
- Way of the Vampire (2005) as Roman
- Halloween Night (2006) as Daryll (as Jared Michaels)
- Sea Me (2006) as Shawn (as Jared Michaels)
- Blood Predator (2007) as Zak
- The Third Summer (2007) as Bags
- Teary Sockets (2008) as Bobby Tear
- Plaguers (2008) as Riley (as Jared Michaels)
- Real Fear (2008) as Johnathan (as Jared Michaels)
- Tyler's Ride (5 episodes, 2008) as Vinnie (as Jared Michaels)
- The Carpenter: Part 1 – And So They Die (2009) as Ted (as Jared Michaels)
- Legend Has It (2009) as Ollie (as Jared Michaels)
- Meaner Than Hell (2009) as Jakob 'Picaro Gonnoff' Baumberger (as Jared Michaels)
- Revenants (2010) as Danny (as Jared Michaels)
- Born Bad (2011) as Jaret
- Underground Lizard People (2011) as Chip
- Incident at Barstow (2011) as Griff (as Jared Michaels)
- 12/12/12 (2012) as Jared
- MoreHorror in Hollywood (1 episode, 2012) as Himself
- 13/13/13 (2013) as Alex
- Asabiyyah: A New Social Cohesion (2013) as Star
- Atlantic Rim (2013) as Spitfire
- EOTM Awards 2013 (2013) as Himself
- The Coed and the Zombie Stoner (2014) as Stoned Zombie
- P-51 Dragon Fighter (2014) as Lt. Gilman
- Feed the Devil (2014) as Marcus
- Pernicious (2015) as Shane
- Hulk Blood Tapes (2015) as Himself
- Wishing for a Dream (2015) as Louis Digman
- Minutes to Midnight (2015) as Richie

==== Director ====
- The Carpenter: Part 1 – And So They Die (2009) (and as screenwriter) (as Jared Michaels)
- Born Bad (2011) (and as writer)
- Underground Lizard People (2011)
- Bikini Spring Break (2012) (and as writer)
- Hold Your Breath (2012)
- 12/12/12 (2012)
- Atlantic Rim (2013)
- Jailbait (2014) (and as writer)
- Bound (2015)
- Buddy Hutchins (2015)
- Hulk Blood Tapes (2015)
- School's Out (2015)
- Little Dead Rotting Hood (2016)
- Wishing for a Dream (2016)
- The Horde (2016)
- Halloween Pussy Trap Kill! Kill! (2017)
- Devil's Revenge (2019)
- Street Survivors: The True Story of the Lynyrd Skynyrd Plane Crash (2020) (and as writer)
- In the Drift (2020)
- Deadlock (2021)
- Vendetta (2022)
- Complex, Texas (TBA)

==== Producer ====
- Legend Has It (2009) (as Jared Michaels)
- Revenants (2010) (as Jared Michaels)
- Night of the Dead (2012)
- Hulk Blood Tapes (2015)

== Reception ==
Cohn's films are typically released direct-to-video, via outlets such as Redbox, basic cable channels or supermarkets.
