= 13/13/13 =

- Film poster
- Directed by: James Cullen Bressack
- Written by: James Cullen Bressack
- Produced by: David Michael Latt; Paul Bales
- Starring: Trae Ireland; Erin Coker; Jody Barton; Jared Cohn; Calico Cooper; Jessica Cameron
- Cinematography: Brian Weber
- Edited by: Robert Stuvland
- Music by: Chris Ridenhour
- Production company: The Asylum
- Distributed by: The Asylum; Edel Media & Entertainment; Lime Lights Pictures; Peacock Films
- Release date: October 1, 2013 (U.S.)
- Country: United States
- Language: English

13/13/13 is a 2013 American horror film written and directed by James Cullen Bressack for The Asylum. It stars Trae Ireland, Erin Coker, Jody Barton, Jared Cohn, Calico Cooper, and Jessica Cameron.

== Plot ==
For a thousand years man has been adding a day to the calendar every 4 years and in doing so violated mankind's interpretation of the Mayan Calendar's prediction that the world would end in 2012. On the 13th day of the 13th month of the new millennium, survivors confront a world of demons. On 13/13/13 the entire human race (with the exception of those born on a leap day) go insane. Those who were born on a leap year are stuck to battle the demons.

== Cast ==
- Trae Ireland as Jack
- Erin Coker as Candace
- Jody Barton as Quentin
- Jared Cohn as Alex
- Calico Cooper as Marcy
- Jessica Cameron as The Receptionist
- J. Scott as Joe
- Bill Voorhees as Trevor
- Tiffany Martinez as Kendra
- Greg Depetro as Dr. Palumbo
- John Andrew Vaas as Dr. Pappas
- Jackie Bressack as Meredith
- David Brite as Gurney Doctor
- Buz Wallick as News Anchor Chet Cheney
- Veronica Ricci as Female News Anchor
- Jack Ricardo Miller as Security Guard
- Cory Jacob as Burn Victim
- Mildraide Lazarre as Crazed Woman
- Tim Lott as Crazed Neighbor
- Kori Agee as Background Crazy

== Critical response ==
Fangoria panned the film, noting that The Asylum took a break from its fare of oversized monsters to present this film "devoid of any creatures that instead tries its hand at suspense—and ultimately leaves one wishing for more shark tales." Director James Cullen Bressack presented his supernatural take on The Crazies but, being backed by The Asylum meant "a tiny budget, brief shooting schedule and lack of quality talent", resulting in a film that failed to give a compelling story. The dialogue was considered "groan-inducing" and the score "grating". The storyline had characters going "bonkers" and the film was weakened by simply spending "too much time showing people sitting around and laughing at each other". Add Trae Ireland's lead character of Jack offering a "pointless backstory at the wrong time, and you’ve got a film where everyone is going insane, but perhaps none more than the viewer." They offered that the film missed its intended mark. "The photography, audio and editing are all inconsistent—though they’re what one might expect from a film whose DVD cover image never appears in the movie itself. Interesting fact about the Mayan calendar: On the date of 13/13/13, there won’t be any color correction. The unimpressive special features include a making-of segment, a gag reel and some trailers", and concluded "13/13/13 is an effort that offers very little worth. If only the Mayans could have seen this coming, they might have adjusted their calendar accordingly".

Starburst Magazine noted that despite Bressack having a strong background in film 13/13/13 "is a bad film. It is a poorly conceived, ill-judged piece of filmmaking that relies entirely on disappointingly tiresome shock tactics to draw any cohesive response from its audience".

Contrarily, Ain't It Cool News felt that despite some weaknesses the film contained enough expected surprises to be worth a watch, writing "one of the things that makes Bressack’s films appealing to me is the personal level which he is unafraid to venture to." The film contained "some very effective scenes, mostly involving kids who get either caught in the mêlée or affected by the disease, but for the most part it doesn’t plumb the depths to which Bressack’s other films dare go".

== Awards and nomination ==
- 2014, won 'Best Director' for James Cullen Bressack at Underground Monster Carnival

== See also ==
- 12/12/12 (film)
- 11/11/11 (film)
