= Shane Van Dyke =

American actor (born 1979)

- Born: Shane Thomas Van Dyke; August 28, 1979 (age 47); Los Angeles, California, U.S.
- Occupations: Actor; screenwriter; director
- Years active: 1993–present
- Spouse: Julie Schreiner
- Children: 1
- Father: Barry Van Dyke
- Relatives: Dick Van Dyke (grandfather); Jerry Van Dyke (great-uncle); Kelly Jean Van Dyke (cousin once removed)

Shane Thomas Van Dyke (born August 28, 1979) is an American actor, screenwriter, and director. He is the son of Barry Van Dyke and grandson of Dick Van Dyke.

== Early life ==
Van Dyke was born in Los Angeles, California, the son of Mary (née Carey) Van Dyke and actor Barry Van Dyke. He has two brothers, Wes and Carey, and a sister, Taryn Van Dyke. He is the paternal grandson of the entertainer Dick Van Dyke. He is also a grandnephew of Jerry Van Dyke and first cousin once removed of Jerry's daughter, Kelly Jean Van Dyke.

Van Dyke's professional acting career began after graduating from high school when he became involved with the theatre program at Moorpark College in California. He launched his television career with a recurring minor role (14 episodes) as medical student Alex Smith on the CBS television show Diagnosis: Murder. In 2002, he starred in the musical Annie.

== Career ==
In the years following his role on Diagnosis: Murder, Van Dyke worked on other television shows including the long-running soap opera The Bold and the Beautiful, as well as the independent film Arizona Summer.

In the summer of 2007, Shane rejoined his grandfather and father in a series of Hallmark Channel Original Movies titled Murder 101. Around the same period, he also co-starred in the mini-series Shark Swarm, opposite John Schneider and Daryl Hannah.

Van Dyke has performed screenwriter duties for various films including Transmorphers 2, Street Racer, Paranormal Entity, The Day the Earth Stopped and The Silence.

Van Dyke was the director and writer of the movie Titanic II (2010) and portrayed the ship's owner, Hayden Walsh. In 2011, Van Dyke appeared as a lifeguard in the SyFy film Super Shark, about a giant shark released from stone by an oil-drilling rig off the California coast. In 2012, he produced (with his brother Carey Van Dyke and Oren Peli) the horror film Chernobyl Diaries.

As of 2009, Van Dyke resides in Los Angeles and is a film and television faculty member with Hollywood for Kids.

In 2019, he and his brother Carey Van Dyke released a spec script titled Don't Worry Darling; the screenplay appeared on the 2019 Black List. A film based on the spec script was announced in August of that year, after a bidding war amongst 18 studios to acquire the project, set to be directed by Olivia Wilde; New Line Cinema won the auction, and the film was released in 2022. Katie Silberman was brought on to rewrite what became the film's screenplay.

== Acting credits ==
=== Film ===
Year	Title	Role	Notes
2004	Arizona Summer	Mike	
2009	Transmorphers: Fall of Man	Jake Van Ryberg	Direct-to-video
2009	Paranormal Entity	Thomas Finley	Direct-to-video
2010	6 Guns		Direct-to-video
2010	Titanic II	Hayden Walsh	Direct-to-video
2011	Super Shark	Greg	Direct-to-video

=== Television ===
Year	Title	Role	Notes
1997, 1999–2001	Diagnosis: Murder	Shane Marshall, Jake Hallman, Tommy Anders, Alex Smith	16 episodes
2002	Diagnosis Murder: Without Warning	Alex Smith	TV film
2003	The Bold and the Beautiful	Fan	Episode: "Episode #1.4019"
2007–2008	Murder 101	Ben Manners	2 episodes
2008	Shark Swarm	Chris	TV film

== Filmmaking credits ==
Year	Title	Writer	Director	Producer	Notes
2008	Street Racer	Yes	No	No	
2008	The Day the Earth Stopped	Yes	No	No	
2009	Transmorphers: Fall of Man	Yes	No	No	
2009	Paranormal Entity	Yes	Yes	No	
2010	6 Guns	No	Yes	No	
2010	Titanic II	Yes	Yes	No	
2011	A Haunting in Salem	No	Yes	No	
2012	Chernobyl Diaries	Yes	No	No	
2012	The Sacred	Yes	No	No	
2013	Battledogs	Yes	No	No	TV film
2019	The Silence	Yes	No	No	
2019	Into the Dark	Yes	No	No	Episode: "They Come Knocking"
2022	Don't Worry Darling	Yes	No	Yes	Story
TBA	Cupid	Yes	No	No	
