= The Day the Earth Stopped =

- The Day the Earth Stopped DVD cover
- Directed by: C. Thomas Howell
- Written by: Darren Dalton; Carey Van Dyke
- Produced by: David Michael Latt
- Starring: C. Thomas Howell; Judd Nelson; Darren Dalton
- Distributed by: The Asylum
- Release date: December 9, 2008
- Running time: 90 minutes
- Country: United States
- Language: English

The Day the Earth Stopped is a 2008 American direct-to-DVD science fiction action horror film produced by independent studio The Asylum, directed by and starring C. Thomas Howell. It is a mockbuster of the 2008 remake of The Day the Earth Stood Still, which was released three days later. Howell stars as the protagonist, soldier Josh Myron, who witnesses the arrival of giant alien robots that threaten to destroy the Earth unless they are shown the value of human existence.

== Plot ==
The film centers on soldier Josh Myron, as six hundred and sixty six gigantic extraterrestrial robots land on Earth.

As the robots are landing, two alien humanoids also arrive, one male and one female. Both are eventually captured by the military who try to communicate with them. Eventually, the female starts talking to Myron and reveals that she can read his mind along with others. Myron is told that the entire human race is a threat to the rest of the galaxy and unless she is shown the value of humanity by sunset, the planet will be destroyed.

Attempts to communicate with the robots fail as they vaporize anyone that tries to attack them or even fires a rifle to get their attention. An effort is made to destroy the robots using Sidewinder Missiles, delivered by YF-22s. The missiles are ineffective and the attacking planes are destroyed.

The woman, who reveals that her name in its closest English translation is Sky, also displays the ability to harness surrounding energy to protect herself. However, after using that, the military officer in charge of the "mission" starts to use a Taser on Sky, leading to Myron violently intervening and being thrown off the project. He goes AWOL but, as he is driving away, he is telepathically contacted by Sky and he returns to rescue her. The effort proves successful and starts a citywide search for him and Sky.

The male alien also manages to escape as the robots begin a systemic attack on the planet, first with an electromagnetic pulse (which aids in Josh rescuing Sky). It is also discovered that the robots are slowing down the Earth's core and stopping the planet's rotation.

An effort is made to destroy one of the robots with a nuclear explosion, sacrificing 9000 inhabitants of a small island. When the bomb goes off, the machine emerges unharmed and Sky feels the pain of the people dying and almost passes out. Josh takes the time to comfort Sky before the military finds them again. Myron and Sky come across a married couple and put the wife in the back of a 4x4, as she is in labour. The husband delivers the child but is unaware of a complication until he realizes that his wife has stopped breathing. Myron hands the infant to Sky and tells her that if she wants to know the value of humanity, "you're staring at it". Myron and the husband try to revive the wife but are unsuccessful. Myron realizes that the wife is dead and stops applying CPR. Sky, despite her earlier statement that she would not get involved, uses her powers to bring the wife back to life.

Sky, now convinced of the value of humanity, needs to get to the closest robot to return home and end the invasion, but, before they can get to the robot, Sky is shot by the military. Sky and Myron are taken back to the base where Sky is treated for the injury, as the planet's rotation stops and a major global earthquake hits.

The commander realizes that Myron was right and helps Myron move Sky to a vehicle. As they leave, they are chased by the psychologist, who is convinced that keeping Sky will prevent the robots from attacking further.

At the feet of the robot, Myron is shot by the psychologist; the robot vaporizes him. The alien male arrives, sees both Sky and Myron possibly dead and uses his own powers to revive both. Sky, in gratitude, hugs Myron before both of the aliens are beamed aboard. The invasion ends and the robots depart, leaving the planet intact but with major damage.

== Cast ==
- C. Thomas Howell as Josh Myron
- Judd Nelson as Charlie
- Darren Dalton as Prewitt
- Sinead McCafferty as Sky
- Bug Hall as Man
- Patrick Ian Moore as Guard
- Gary Daniels as Himself (uncredited)

== Production ==
Although its title and premise are similar to those of the 2008 remake of The Day the Earth Stood Still, the film's plot also incorporates elements from other science-fiction films involving aliens, such as Transformers, Independence Day and Earth vs. the Flying Saucers. It was Howell's second directing turn for Asylum, after War of the Worlds 2: The Next Wave.

== Controversy ==
Due to its similarities with The Day the Earth Stood Still, The Asylum was threatened with legal action by 20th Century Fox over the release. However, no action was taken.

== Reception ==
Many critics considered The Day the Earth Stopped one of Asylum's best films, and in many ways superior to the original. However, Moira gave the movie one star, finding it so uninspired and generic that it was "hard to care what happens".

Screen Rant found it "a fun B-Movie" and "an improvement on the original", while Dread Central found it tedious.

== Release ==
It was released on DVD by The Asylum on December 9, 3 days before Fox's remake was released to theaters. Echo Bridge Entertainment re-released it on DVD and released it on Blu-Ray May 18, 2010. It was also included in a Blu-Ray double feature with War of the Worlds 2: The Next Wave and a DVD triple feature with Transmorphers: Fall of Man and Countdown: Armageddon.

In addition to its home video release, the movie can be streamed on many sites, including Plex, Tubi and YouTube, as of November 2022.

== See also ==
- H. G. Wells' War of the Worlds - Another film by The Asylum starring C. Thomas Howell which features an invasion by extraterrestrials
- Invasion of the Pod People - A similar film produced by The Asylum and released in 2007
- Transmorphers - Another film by The Asylum with a similar storyline
- Mockbuster
