= The Silence (2019 film) =

2019 film by John R. Leonetti

- Film poster
- Directed by: John R. Leonetti
- Written by: Carey Van Dyke; Shane Van Dyke
- Based on: The Silence by Tim Lebbon
- Produced by: Robert Kulzer; Scott Lambert; Alexandra Milchan
- Starring: Kiernan Shipka; Stanley Tucci; Miranda Otto; John Corbett
- Cinematography: Michael Galbraith
- Edited by: Michele Conroy
- Music by: Tomandandy
- Production companies: Constantin Film; EMJAG Productions
- Distributed by: Constantin Film (Germany); Netflix (international)
- Release date: April 10, 2019
- Running time: 90 minutes
- Countries: Germany; United States
- Languages: English; American Sign Language
- Box office: $2.3 million

The Silence is a 2019 post-apocalyptic horror film directed by John R. Leonetti and starring Kiernan Shipka, Stanley Tucci, Miranda Otto, and John Corbett. The screenplay by Carey and Shane Van Dyke adapts the 2015 horror novel of the same name by Tim Lebbon. The film depicts a world under attack by creatures who hunt by sound. Shipka plays a deaf teenager who seeks shelter with her family, and a cult tries to take advantage of her fertility.

Netflix released The Silence on April 10, 2019. It was also released in theaters in seven countries in the rest of 2019, grossing $2.3 million.

== Plot ==
A cave research team accidentally unearths an unknown species of pterosaur-like creatures from a mine. The creatures, referred to as "Vesps", kill the researchers, escape the mine, and seek the noisiest areas.

Ally Andrews, a teenage girl who lost her hearing in a car accident, lives with her parents Hugh and Kelly, her grandmother Lynn who suffers from lung cancer, her brother Jude, and their rottweiler, Otis. After being bullied at school, Ally walks home with her new boyfriend Rob, informs her parents about him and how her day was, and then heads off to bed. At night, the family learns of the Vesps after seeing footage of the initial attack on the news and the U.S. government urges people to stay indoors and quiet. Ally convinces her family to leave for the countryside since the cities are packed with Vesps. As they are joined by Hugh's friend Glenn, who brings guns, a man tries to carjack Hugh, but Glenn shoots the man and the family flees.

Interstate traffic becomes gridlocked, prompting Glenn to drive off-road. His car crashes into a herd of deer, and he becomes trapped. Otis barks and attracts Vesps; Glenn fires his gun to divert them and is eaten alive by the Vesps. Hugh releases Otis and the dog is killed as well. After Hugh distracts a Vesp with a tire iron, he determines that the Vesps are blind and hunt by sound. He burns Glenn's car as a diversion and leads the family on foot, abandoning their car. The family reaches a compound house; the homeowner confronts them and is killed by Vesps. Kelly is bitten, and the family shelters inside.

Ally learns that religious cults have sprung up during the outbreak, claiming the Vesps were sent by God as a divine punishment to purge the world of sin. Kelly's wound becomes infected, and Hugh and Ally leave the compound to search for antibiotics. In a store, Ally finds Vesp eggs growing inside corpses, and the pair flee using a sprinkler system as a diversion when one of the eggs hatched and causes adult Vesps to arrive. When they run into a reverend of a cult called “The Hushed”, he tries to recruit them both, but Hugh declines as they walk away. They return with antibiotics, and Kelly recovers. Ally learns online that Vesps cannot survive in the cold, and informs the family who then head north.

As The Hushed locate their hideout, the tongueless reverend says that Ally is "fertile", meaning that he intends to use her as a sex slave to repopulate the world. Hugh, furious that the reverend wants to rape his daughter, forces the cult to leave at gunpoint. Later at night, Rob texts Ally that he is traveling north to "The Refuge", but her internet connection dies before she learns of its location. When the family finds a little girl with her tongue cut out and bruises all over her chin, they realize that she’s a member of the cult. Cell phones strapped to her chest and around the house go off, attracting the Vesps. Hiding in the basement, the cult members abduct Ally. Lynn restrains the captors and sacrifices herself to save Ally as she screams, attracting the Vesps and she and the captors are killed by them. The remaining cult members kidnap Ally in the rain, but before the reverend could rape her in the grass, the family kills the cult, and Hugh kills the reverend by bludgeoning him to death with a shotgun.

Weeks later, the family reaches The Refuge, located in Alaska. Ally reunites with Rob and as she kills the remaining Vesps with arrows, she wonders whether the Vesps will adapt to the cold or if humans will adapt to living without sound, and concludes that only time will tell.

== Cast ==
- Stanley Tucci as Hugh Andrews
- Kiernan Shipka as Ally Andrews
- Miranda Otto as Kelly Andrews
- Kate Trotter as Lynn
- John Corbett as Glenn
- Kyle Harrison Breitkopf as Jude Andrews
- Dempsey Bryk as Rob
- Billy MacLellan as The Reverend

== Production ==
The Silence is based on the 2015 horror novel of the same name by Tim Lebbon. The film is directed by John R. Leonetti based on an adapted screenplay by Carey Van Dyke and Shane Van Dyke. Actors Kiernan Shipka and Stanley Tucci were cast in the film in May 2017. In the following August, additional cast members were hired.

Principal photography began in Toronto in September 2017.

The Vesp creature, with translucent skin and other similarities to cave creatures

According to the film's production notes, the creatures are named "vesps" after the Spanish avispa, meaning wasps. Director John R. Leonetti said that research was done into other cave creatures to design the Vesps. "Their skin is translucent, they have wings, and they fly, but they also crawl and lay eggs like reptiles ... A lot of scientific research went into the design, the creation, and the computer animation of the creatures, right down to the detail of every joint, every vessel, and every move they make."

== Release ==
Netflix released The Silence on April 10, 2019. Global Road Entertainment originally acquired in December 2017 the U.S. distribution rights to the film and was supposed to be released theatrically on December 7, 2018. The distributor had financial troubles, and in a failed attempt to avoid bankruptcy, Global Road pulled the film from the release schedule and sold distribution rights to various films, including The Silence, to Netflix.

The film was also released in seven countries around the world, Austria, Germany, Switzerland, Bolivia, Singapore, South Korea, and China, grossing over $2.3 million.

== Critical reception ==
Review aggregator website Rotten Tomatoes reports an approval rating of 30% based on 37 reviews, with an average rating of 4.2/10. The site's critics' consensus reads: "The Silence has nothing new to say with a derivative premise and placid pacing -- even a wasted Stanley Tucci is unable to elevate the stodgy material a decibel above dreadful." Metacritic assigned the film a score of 25 out of 100 from four critics, reflecting "generally unfavorable reviews".

Scott Tobias, reviewing for The New York Times, called The Silence "niche-targeted dreck" where "only a quality cast and more generous production values can cover up the shoddy stitching". Tobias said despite the film's depiction of "a grand evolutionary struggle... every moment feels like regression". RogerEbert.com's Brian Tallerico said that The Silence was "a dull retread of ideas explored more interestingly in other films and TV shows", and went on to say, "The Silence is barely a horror movie, and that's its biggest problem. A horror movie needs stakes, and you just never feel them here."

== Social commentary ==
=== Deaf portrayal ===
Hearing actress Kiernan Shipka plays the lead character, a deaf teenager who battles monsters. Shipka learned some parts of American Sign Language for the role, and director John R. Leonetti said in an interview, "She learned to sign for the film, and now she's flawless, like she's been signing her entire life. She seems to have an almost innate sense of what it's like being a deaf person." Deaf celebrities Nyle DiMarco and Marlee Matlin and other members of the deaf community criticized Leonetti for saying that Shipka learning to sign was synonymous with knowing the culturally deaf experience and for undermining deaf representation by casting a hearing actor. DiMarco also criticized Shipka's ASL grammar, and others pointed out plot holes related to her character being deaf.

=== Comparison to A Quiet Place ===
The Silence was compared to A Quiet Place, a 2018 horror film with a similar premise. The novel The Silence was published in 2015, and filming of the adaptation took place in 2017, at the same time as A Quiet Place. While The Silence was acquired by a distributor, it was not released in theaters and was later picked up by Netflix. Quartz's Adam Epstein said while the parallel productions were coincidental, he compared The Silence to mockbusters (low-budget films that exploit blockbusters), highlighting that one of its screenwriters, Shane Van Dyke, wrote several scripts for The Asylum, a studio that specializes in mockbusters. The novel's author Tim Lebbon admitted that the two films' similarities are "a little troubling" and defended the film adaptation of his novel: "There are similarities, of course, but I'm confident that the movie of The Silence will stand on its own."

The Guardian's Charles Bramesco called The Silence "a shoddy remix" of A Quiet Place and said, "The Silence exists for the sole purpose of being digitally sorted into a list of recommendations For Viewers Who Liked Bird Box, though that classification would be more accurately clocked as For Viewers Who Liked A Quiet Place... the demographic they're really after would be something closer to Viewers Who Have Trouble Telling Similar Things Apart." Decider's Anna Menta compared the films, "The Silence is much darker and gorier than A Quiet Place," and found The Silence to look low-budget in production values. Menta said The Silence was started before the invasion while A Quiet Place was set fully after the invasion. She noted the criticism of The Silence for having a hearing actor as a deaf character and highlighted its additional elements, a teen romance and a religious cult.

Writing for Comic Book Resources, Renaldo Matadeen contrasted The Silence from A Quiet Place, writing, "There are quite a few plot threads which make it clear the Netflix movie is far from a rip-off and is, in fact, it's [sic] own thing." Matadeen said The Silence's deaf teenaged girl can read lips and speak, "After a while, you almost forget Ally is deaf, resulting in the film lacking some of the genuine tension of A Quiet Place. He found the creatures "totally different", as well as the times compared to the creature invasion. While both films have "a somewhat similar format" in families trying to survive the creatures, "In The Silence, we get interference from external segments of mankind via the Hushed."

== See also ==
- List of films featuring the deaf and hard of hearing
