= Titanic 666 =

2022 film directed by Nick Lyon

- Official release poster
- Directed by: Nick Lyon
- Written by: Jacob Cooney; Jason White
- Produced by: David Michael Latt
- Starring: Jamie Bamber; Keesha Sharp; AnnaLynne McCord; Lydia Hearst; Joseph Gatt
- Cinematography: Taylor James Randall
- Edited by: Justin Arbabi
- Music by: Christopher Cano; Mikel Shane Prather; Chris Ridenhour
- Production company: The Asylum
- Distributed by: Tubi
- Release date: April 15, 2022
- Running time: 91 minutes
- Country: United States
- Language: English

Titanic 666 (also known as Titanic Rises and Titanic 3) is a 2022 American supernatural horror film directed by Nick Lyon and produced by The Asylum. It is a sequel to Titanic II (2010) and stars Jamie Bamber and Keesha Sharp. It was released on Tubi in the United States on April 15, 2022, on the 110th anniversary of the sinking of the Titanic. The film received generally unfavorable reviews, and users on social media noted the film's similarity to Titanic (1997) and Studio 666 (2022).

== Plot ==
On April 15, 1912, Elyzabeth desperately searches for her husband Charles as the original RMS Titanic sinks. She reaches a lifeboat, but after its ropes mysteriously loosen, killing several people, she survives the sinking. She sees Charles drown in the wreckage, but he returns as a ghost and pulls her into the ocean.

On April 15, 2022 (110 years after the sinking of the Titanic and 10 years after the events of Titanic II), the luxury cruise ship Titanic III is christened and begins the same route as the original. Married influencers Mia and Jackson Stone board with their fan Nancy, while Captain Celeste Rhoades warns her crew to avoid the disasters that befell the previous Titanics. Stowaway Idina Bess enters the basement and steals an artifact from Professor Hal Cochran's collection of Titanic victims' possessions. Mia and Jackson investigate the Titanic through their networks, clashing with Hal. Crew member Julie announces a commemoration of the original Titanic that evening.

In the basement, Idina performs a satanic ritual to resurrect her great-grandfather, Captain Edward Smith. Smith summons the souls of those who died in the original disaster. Mia, Jackson and Nancy witness the event but dismiss it.

During the commemoration, Mia and Jackson are attacked by the original Titanic's orchestra. Jackson disappears and Mia is killed. Rhoades interrogates Hal and forces him below deck, where a ghost attacks him. Meanwhile, the ghosts kill the engineers in the engine room and seize control of the ship. Rhoades and crew member Brian discover the bodies and attempt to shut down the engines, but the turbines explode, disabling the controls.

As the ghosts attack the passengers, Brian arrests Idina, but she kills him and escapes with Smith's help. Possessed by Smith's ghost, Idina goes to the bridge intending to crash the ship into an iceberg. Rhoades tries to stop her, but Idina kills herself, causing the ship to collide with the iceberg. Rhoades orders the surviving passengers into the lifeboats, although many passengers and crew, including Julie and Brian, have been killed. Hal and Rhoades board a lifeboat with Nancy and others, but the ropes loosen, killing almost everyone.

As the ship sinks, Hal and Rhoades remain alive in the lifeboat. Hal blames himself for the disaster before dying of hypothermia. When Rhoades tries to revive him, his ghost attacks her.

== Cast ==
=== Fictional characters ===
- Keesha Sharp as Captain Celeste Rhoades
- Jamie Bamber as Professor Hal Cochran
- Lydia Hearst as Idina Bess, secretly the great-granddaughter of Captain Edward Smith
- AnnaLynne McCord as Mia Stone
- Joseph Gatt as Brian Andrews
- Derek Yates as Jackson Stone
- Jhey Castles as Julie
- Al Coronel as Hector
- Kendall Chappell as Regina
- Giovannie Pico as Nancy
  - Sophie Jordan Collins as Nancy's ghost
- Michael J. Chen as Parker
- Joseph Massaquoi as Sykes
- Maurice Johnson as Collins
- Hevanly Reyna as Elizabeth
- Neil Dickson as Mr. Wick
- Jody Jaress as Mrs. Straus
- Micaiah Chen as Adelina
- Cami Storm as Adelina's Mom
- DJames Jones as Adelina's Dad
- Gary Murakami as Buck
  - Jai Pellerin as Buck Double
- Andre Pelzer as Michael
- Trevor Hansen as Charlie

=== Historical characters ===
- Xander Bailey as Captain Edward Smith
- Brendan Petrizzo as Wallace Hartley
- Brittany Daley as John Jacob Astor IV

== Reception ==
In his review in Paste, Matt Donato rated it 4/10 saying that "while Netflix harbors Oscar aspirations for its originals, Tubi appears content being the streaming equivalent of SYFY after midnight. (...) I've seen worse films this year than Titanic 666, but also too many better examples."

On Crooked Marquee, Josh Bell rated it a "C−", calling it "a slow, dull haunted-ship story that takes far too long to get to its meager terrors." Waldemar Dalenogare Neto evaluated it with a score of 1/10 and said that "I already knew it was a bad movie, the trailer is already a disgrace."
