= A Haunting in Salem =

- Promotional poster
- Directed by: Shane Van Dyke
- Screenplay by: H. Perry Horton
- Produced by: David Michael Latt; David Rimawi; Paul Bales
- Starring: Bill Oberst Jr. Courtney Abbiati; Jenna Stone; Nicholas Harsin
- Cinematography: Alexander Yellen
- Edited by: James Kondelik
- Music by: Chris Ridenhour
- Production company: The Asylum
- Release date: August 23, 2011
- Running time: 90 minutes
- Country: United States
- Language: English

A Haunting in Salem is a 2011 3D horror film directed by Shane Van Dyke and starring Bill Oberst Jr., Courtney Abbiati, Jenna Stone and Nicholas Harsin.

== Synopsis ==
The new town sheriff (Bill Oberst Jr) moves into a large creepy old house with his family. It seems that in the town of Salem there’s a special house for the sheriff to live in for free. Unfortunately it’s haunted by witches that have a strong craving for sheriff’s blood.

== Cast ==
- Bill Oberst Jr. as Wayne
- Courtney Abbiati as Carrie
- Jenna Stone as Ali
- Nicholas Harsin as Kyle
- Carey Van Dyke as Mike
- Gerald Webb as Mayor Collins

== Production ==
A Haunting in Salem was filmed in a 200-year-old mansion in Pasadena, CA. The movie was done old school with very few special effects, and used as its premise, the Salem witch trials of 1692.

"A Haunting in Salem" was shot in Native 3D using the Alterna GV-4 beam splitter rig and 2 Red One cameras. Shot in 12 days, the production managed up to 28 set ups per day. Shannon Benna was stereographer and is credited as "Hollywood’s First Female Feature Stereographer" for her work on this film.

== Critical response ==
KTLA reviewer spoke toward the film's DVD release, writing that the film was a "mixed bag", in that "Nothing is particularly good (there is certainly nothing that would be considered great) and much is quite bad." The reviewer took issue with the acting, offering that even the simplest lines felt hammed up, with the cast giving performances at a level with community theater. He also found flaw with Shane Van Dyke's directing, in that while his use of "shock tactics and very predictable setups for the scares can be forgiven", the director never connected with his audience. The reviewer did have positive response for actress Jenna Stone, and that the "cheesy" and "carnival spook house" type monsters did not have much actual screen time or were seen from a distance. The reviewer's summation included that the combination of bad acting and cheap special effects gave the film a "very 'let’s-get-a-camera-and-make-a-movie' home grown feel that doesn’t exactly hurt the final product", in that the combination contributed to a "cheesy charm".

Consumer Reports wrote that the film "peaks early" and then "loses steam", and that while its use of 3D "isn’t gimmicky", "it’s most effective at fondling the creepiness of the house where most of the action is located."

Rock102online gave a positive review saying, "A Haunting In Salem bills itself as a spine-tingling, haunted chiller in the tradition of The Amityville Horror and The Shining and, much like those classics, it succeeded in delivering numerous jumps and scares that kept me thinking about them long after the final credits rolled. Bill Oberst, Jr. was very convincing as a damaged man who becomes the new sheriff of Salem and inadvertently moves his family into a cursed house filled with vengeful ghosts."

Horrortalk also gave a positive review saying, "A Haunting in Salem is nowhere near the bottom of their catalog of The Asylum's offerings" and praise the direction of Shane Van Dyke to give the film short time to hit its stride as a quality genre piece. The website gave the film an overall of 3 star rating out of five.

== Release ==
A Haunting in Salem was released September 23, 2011.

=== DVD ===
The DVD and Blu-ray was released on October 4, 2011. It features 6-minute behind the scenes effort that went into making the film, and a gag reel. KTLA offered that the anamorphic transfer is sharp, bright and clear, but as the film was originally shot in 3D, this results in a "flat feel to it which gives it a very low budget look".
