= 11/11/11 (film) =

- Directed by: Keith Allan
- Written by: Keith Allan; Kiff Scholl
- Produced by: David Michael Latt
- Starring: Jon Briddell; Erin Coker; Hayden Byerly
- Cinematography: Alexander Yellen
- Edited by: Maureen Murphy
- Music by: Chris Ridenhour
- Distributed by: The Asylum
- Release date: November 1, 2011
- Running time: 87 minutes
- Country: United States
- Language: English

11/11/11 is a 2011 horror film directed by Keith Allan and starring Jon Briddell, Erin Coker, and Hayden Byerly. It is The Asylum's "mockbuster" equivalent to Darren Lynn Bousman's 11-11-11. It is also a knockoff of The Omen.

== Premise ==
Jack and Melissa Vales become increasingly frightened as their young son, Nathan, expresses violent and bizarre behavior; what the couple soon learn is that their son's upcoming birthday of November 11, the Apocalypse will occur and Nathan is the gateway.

== Cast ==
- Jon Briddell as Jack Vales
- Erin Coker as Melissa Vales
- Hayden Byerly as Nathan "Nat" Vales
- Tracy J. Pulliam as Janice Karpinsky
- Madonna Magee as Annie
- David Bertolami as Chris Demms
- Rebecca Sigl as Sarah Blight
- Kiff Scholl as Brian Miles
- Aurelia Scheppers as Denise
- Kari Nissena as Sofie
- Scott McKinley as Dr. James Bolger
- Lauren Dobbins Webb as Rhonda
- Nicholas S. Williams as Mick
- Melissa Wintringham as Marie
- Raymond Gaston as Kahlid Othman
- Catherine Lidstone as Miranda Bolger

== See also ==
- 12/12/12 (film)
- 13/13/13 (film)
