= Vampires vs. Zombies =

- DVD cover
- Directed by: Vince D'Amato
- Written by: Sheridan Le Fanu; Vince D'Amato
- Produced by: Rob Carpenter; Damien Foisy
- Starring: Bonny Giroux; C.S. Munro; Maratama Carlson; Brinke Stevens; Peter Ruginis; Melanie Crystal
- Cinematography: Damien Foisy
- Edited by: Vince D'Amato; Nicole Hancock
- Music by: Mikael Jacobson; James Dallimore
- Distributed by: The Asylum
- Release date: April 13, 2004
- Running time: 85 minutes
- Country: United States
- Language: English

Vampires vs. Zombies is a 2004 American independent horror film loosely based upon J. Sheridan Le Fanu's classic 1872 novel Carmilla. Unlike Le Fanu's story, however, most of the action in the film takes place inside a car. The title and cover artwork were obviously inspired by the then-current horror film Freddy vs. Jason, but the movie itself bears less resemblance to this counterpart compared to other, more blatant Asylum mockbusters. The movie was originally titled Vampires vs. Zombies, but it has since then been changed to Carmilla, the Lesbian Vampire. Vince D'Amato is the director and screenwriter of this film.

== Synopsis ==
=== Nightmare ===
The film begins with a scene showing a sleeping girl being menaced by a female vampire in her bedroom. The dream is abandoned when the sleeping girl wakes up screaming in the front seat of her father's forest green Jeep Cherokee. She then tells her father that she has had "the same dream again".

=== Speeding Crash ===
Jenny and her father, Travis, who is at the helm of said forest green Jeep Cherokee, are driving at a steady 5 miles per hour, to an undisclosed location. Suddenly there is an incident. Jenny yells out "DAD!" as the jeep proceeds to plow over a zombie dressed up like a roadside construction worker. The zombie's head goes flying skyward immediately following the impact, though its body still shows a head visibly attached. The audience is then treated to a techno rave ballad as the jeep fades from view, and the beginning credits roll.

=== Zombie Hell ===
A radio news reporter describes a recent and horrific epidemic of zombiedom that has swept the calm countryside of the once peaceful set of woods with one road and a gas station. The reports indicate that a symptom of said outbreak is "murder". They then pull up beside a stalled car with three occupants: an older woman and two younger women- one of whom is bound and gagged. Ignoring the bound and gagged girl, Travis gives the other girl a lift. This girl is possibly a vampire named Carmilla, or possibly not. This is followed by a very long sequence at a roadside gas-station in which a strange woman in gothic make-up (possibly a witch or sorceress) hands them a necklace.

=== Checking into the Madhouse ===
As the gas-station attendant (played by producer Rob Carpenter) gets sucked into an orgy of violence at the hands of vampires/zombies, Travis, his daughter Jenny, and Carmilla drive off, only to break down further down the road. They are stranded for hours until a guy in a Land Rover drives up. As the driver is turning into a vampire, Travis kills him and uses some of his supplies to fix the jeep. He lets Jenny and Carmilla steal the Land Rover. As Travis drives ahead in the jeep, Carmilla and Jenny indulge in lesbian sex in the commandeered Land Rover. The destination is the original crypt Carmilla had been buried in. Flashbacks of a madhouse emerge, where Carmilla is revealed to be a nurse, and Jenny her insane patient. Later, they make their way to the crypt, where they encounter more zombies/vampires. After the true reality of the situation is revealed, they check into a motel. Bright-red stage blood flows in these gory and surreal scenes, which could be delusional or possibly flash-backs. There is also a vampire-hunter known as 'The General' who may be pursuing them, or possibly, arranging a rendezvous, due to his daughter being kidnapped by a female colleague of Carmilla.

The film ends with a spinning book and the words, The End.

== Critical reception ==
- According to 'Dr Gore' the film demonstrates "Grade-Z incompetence". He gives it a "Landfill" rating.
- 'Wooden Spoon' describes the film's script as "abominable" and opines that it is "worse than Troll 2".
- 'Movie House Commentary' reflects that "the actors deliver their lines with the unnatural inflections of small-time appliance store owners doing their own local TV commercials".
- According to Something Awful's Movie Review, director "Vince D'Amato took a premise that was basically guaranteed to make his movie an instant hit with the indie horror crowd in spite of his nonexistent budget, and he fucked it until it bled. The resulting wretched, scarred, abused, tortured rape victim of a movie is an unwatchable seventy minutes of shattered homes and broken dreams."
- Some reviews of the film are positive: Horror Express stated that "what we have is a film that purports to be based on Sheridan Le Fanu's short story, 'Carmilla.' I've read that story more than once, and although this is a loose adaptation, it's more faithful than some other filmmakers who adapted Le Fanu's work, seemingly without reading it."

== DVD release ==
The film was released on DVD on September 12, 2008.
