= Mojave Phone Booth =

2006 American independent film

- Promotional poster
- Directed by: John Putch
- Written by: John Putch; Jerry Rapp
- Produced by: Jerry P Jacobs; John Putch; Jerry Rapp
- Starring: Annabeth Gish; Steve Guttenberg; Christine Elise; Tinarie Van Wyk-Loots; Robert Romanus; Missi Pyle
- Cinematography: Keith J. Duggan
- Edited by: John Putch
- Music by: Alexander Baker; Bruce Watson
- Distributed by: MPB Collective
- Release date: 2006
- Running time: 88 minutes
- Country: United States
- Language: English

Mojave Phone Booth is an independently produced 2006 film directed by John Putch. The film is based on a real phone booth in the Mojave Desert that once accepted incoming calls, but has since been removed.

== Synopsis ==
The film is composed of the intertwined stories of four Las Vegas people whose lives are each connected by the vandalized but functioning Mojave phone booth. An isolated structure in the desert, some 15 miles from the nearest highway and miles from any other building, the booth became an internet phenomenon in 1997. The movie portrays the stories of four fictional travelers, separately drawn to visit the booth in the hopes the phone there might suddenly ring, allowing them to randomly connect with a stranger (this type of pilgrimage was actually practiced by many people prior to the real booth being removed on May 17, 2000, by Pacific Bell).

The travelers are Beth who is trying to resolve problems with her love life, as well as a mysterious, recurring crime; Mary who is considering resorting to prostitution to escape the depressing circumstances of her life; Alex who is losing her lover, Glory, to a belief she is plagued by aliens; Richard, an alcoholic, who is severely depressed by being separated from his wife and chances upon the booth after a suicide attempt.

== Cast ==
- Annabeth Gish as Beth
- Steve Guttenberg as Barry
- Christine Elise as Alex
- Tinarie Van Wyk-Loots as Mary
- Robert Romanus as Richard
- David DeLuise as Michael
- Missi Pyle as Sarah
- Kevin Rahm as Tim
- Larry Poindexter as Darrell
- Joy Gohring as Glory
- Jacleen Haber as Rachel
- Shani Wallis as Voice of Greta

== Awards ==
In 2006 and 2007, the film won these awards:

- HDFest 2006: "Best Directing in an HD Feature", "Best High-Definition Feature", "Best Screenplay in an HD Feature"
- Kansas International Film Festival 2006: "Audience Award"
- Stony Brook Film Festival 2006: "Best Feature"
- Valley Film Festival 2006: "10 Degrees Hotter Award"
- Wine Country Film Festival 2006: "Best Independent Feature Under $100,000"
- Oxford International Film Festival 2007: "Audience Award: Best *Narrative Feature"
- Del Ray Beach Film Festival "Best Feature 2006"
- Real To Reel Film Festival 2007 "Jury Award Best Feature"
- Evil City Film Festival 2007 "Best Screenplay"
- Palm Springs Film Festival 2007 "Best of Fest List"
- Santa Fe Film Festival 2007 "Best of Southwest"
- First Glance Hollywood FF 2006 "Third Place Feature"
- Seattle True Independent Film Festival 2007 "Best use of Mike Damone"
