= H. G. Wells' War of the Worlds (The Asylum film) =

2005 film by David Michael Latt

- DVD release cover
- Genre: Action; Adventure; Horror; Sci-Fi; Thriller
- Based on: The War of the Worlds by H. G. Wells
- Written by: David Michael Latt; Carlos De Los Rios
- Directed by: David Michael Latt
- Starring: C. Thomas Howell; Rhett Giles; Tinarie Van Wyk-Loots; Andy Lauer; Peter Greene; Jake Busey
- Music by: Ralph Rieckermann
- Countries of origin: United States; Japan
- Original language: English

Production
- Producer: David Rimawi
- Cinematography: Steven Parker; Lucia Diaz Sas
- Editor: David Michael Latt
- Running time: 90 minutes
- Production company: The Asylum
- Budget: $1 million

Original release
- Network: Sci Fi Channel
- Release: June 28, 2005

H. G. Wells' War of the Worlds, titled Invasion internationally, is a 2005 American science fiction film directed and co-written by David Michael Latt. Produced and distributed by The Asylum, it is an adaptation of the H. G. Wells' novel of the same name and was one of three films released in 2005 adapting the novel, after the Steven Spielberg version and the Timothy Hines version. It stars C. Thomas Howell, Peter Greene, and Jake Busey.

A contemporary translation of the novel set in the United States, the film tells of an invasion of Earth by technologically advanced extraterrestrials, from the perspective of an American astronomer trying to reunite with his family. It is the only adaptation besides the 1953 film in which the main character actively tries to repel the aliens. The film is loosely based on an unproduced screenplay called "Invasion", written by Carlos De Los Rios in 1997.

The film was released on DVD on June 28, one day before Spielberg's film's release. The film is The Asylum's most successful production to date, having sold over 250,000 copies from Blockbuster upon its release. A sequel, War of the Worlds 2: The Next Wave, was released in 2008.

== Plot ==
A live video feed of the surface of Mars is destroyed by an unseen force. Astronomer George Herbert (Howell) and his wife Felicity (Van Wyk Loots) are packing for a trip to Washington, D.C. to celebrate their 10th wedding anniversary. Their son Alex spots a meteorite entering Earth's atmosphere. George is called to work about the meteorite, Felicity and Alex leave early for D.C. without him.

As he drives to work, a meteorite lands. An alien "walker" emerges from the crater and massacres the witnesses with an energy weapon, George barely escaping with his life. George decides to meet with his brother Matt in Hopewell before moving on to Washington, D.C.. Despite rumors that D.C. has suffered some of the worst of the invasion thus far, George moves onward and meets Sgt. Kerry Williams, the last remaining member of his unit. George and Williams meet with Samuelson, a power-mad lieutenant with unrealistic notions of resistance against the invaders, who rejects them as cowards. George and Sgt.Williams find a dying Matt as the aliens unexpectedly attack, and are separated in the battle.

Moving on, George befriends Victor, an Australian Pastor who believes the invasion is the Rapture. Victor's faith is bruised when a hysterical member of his church curses God for the death of her children. George and Victor witness the final effort of the military against the aliens, who defeat them with toxic gas. The two seek refuge in the abandoned house of a veterinarian for food when the neighborhood is flattened by another meteorite. George observes the aliens setting up a camp and harvesting humans while Victor becomes despondent.

George finds a rabies vaccine and plans to use it against the aliens. George successfully injects a curious alien, only for it to kill Victor and leave. The aliens quietly leave their camp, petting George to flee. George reunites with Sgt. Williams and a deranged Samuelson, who has given himself a battlefield promotion. Samuelson senselessly murders Williams, and George in turn kills Samuelson.

George finally reaches a completely destroyed D.C.. Feeling defeated, George offers his life to the aliens but finds that they have all died from bacteria, from which they had no immunity. George finds Felicity and Alex alive among the few human survivors.

== Cast ==
- C. Thomas Howell as Dr. George Herbert
- Andy Lauer as Sergeant Kerry Williams
- Rhett Giles as Pastor Victor
- Tinarie Van Wyk-Loots as Felicity Herbert
- Jake Busey as Lieutenant / General Samuelson
- Peter Greene as Matt Herbert
- Dashiell Howell as Alex Herbert
- Edward DeRuiter as Max

== Adapting the novel ==
Director/editor/executive producer/co-writer David Michael Latt (who admits to never seeing the Byron Haskin/George Pal version or the 1988 television series, but has been a fan of the H.G. Wells novel since childhood) made it clear that his film changed certain aspects from the source material in addition to the time and location. Most notable is that the tripods have been changed to six-legged crab-like machines called "walkers" (a result of allowing the effects team creative freedom).

The aliens are indeed Martians (though the film never states this, it is suggested as an opening credit sequence uses shots of the Red Planet's landscape), but they bear little resemblance to their novel's counterparts. Whereas Wells described his invaders as bear-sized tentacled creatures, the film's Martians are insect-like with four tentacle-like legs. These aliens also have the ability to spit acid from their feet, which melts anything. At the end of the legs three tongue-like appendages closely resemble the Martian fingers from Byron Haskin's 1953 film version of The War of the Worlds and the 1988 television series version.

The war machines are crab-like "walkers" with six legs. A Heat Ray is built into the machine's "head", and is fired from a single eye. The fighting machines do not appear to have protection against modern artillery (avoiding the "invisible shields" seen in the 1953 film version and Steven Spielberg's 2005 film), leaving their ability to conquer unexplained. The aliens do have a substance similar to the black smoke, but is more of a dense green toxic gas unable to rise above ground level, allowing survivors to escape by getting to high places.

The protagonist is George Herbert, a reference to H. G. Wells. Rather than being a writer, as in the novel, he is an astronomer. The film leaves the eve of the war storyline and its characters almost completely absent. He also has a son, who is portrayed by Dashiell Howell, who is actually the son of George's actor C. Thomas Howell.

Despite these differences, George goes through much of what befalls the novel's protagonist, even in sacrificing himself to the Martians, only for them to drop dead of infection. He is also separated from his family and tries to reunite with them once the invasion begins, As in the novel, they are alive at the conclusion. George's brother, a Ranger, is less fortunate; he is seen only briefly after being fatally wounded in an attack by the invaders. In the book, the narrator's brother takes up a major narrative role.

A major deviation from the text is that the protagonist actually tries to produce a means of stopping the Martians, but whether or not he is directly responsible for their downfall is ambiguous. There is a theme of disease throughout - George's son is seen suffering from a mild cold, while George himself suffers from a major fever which leaves him incapacitated for two days.

The novel's Artilleryman is divided into two characters. The first, Kerry Williams, exhibits the defeated status. He accompanies George as they move to unaffected areas, meeting soldiers oblivious to the danger they will soon face, until they become separated when George takes refuge underwater to evade the Martians. After his ordeal in the ruined house, George encounters the same defeatist Williams again. Instead, the other personality, portrayed in the novel's later stages, is Lt. Samuelson.

The novel's unnamed Curate is Victor in the film. While the two are very similar, Victor, a priest, is optimistic and is sure that the invasion is the Rapture. However, his faith is deeply shaken when he meets a congregant who screams against God for the loss of her family, causing Victor to question why he himself has yet to be taken. Unlike the Curate, Victor keeps his composure when he is trapped in the ruined house as he wrestles with his thoughts. Where the Curate had to be subdued in the novel, Victor regains his faith just before he is killed by the Martians.

The film includes homages to the 1953 film. The aliens' hands deliberately resemble those of the Martians of the 1953 film, and the protagonists of each film both actively try to weaken the aliens, another deviation from the novel.

== Reception ==
Felix Vasquez Jr. of Cinema Crazed wrote: "It really says something that it took three writers to produce such a piece of junk." Everything Action states that the movie generally follows the outline of Wells' book, but found that the movie is not worth watching as it tries too hard to be taken seriously.

Scott Weinberg of DVDTalk.com gave it 3 out of 5 and wrote: "As direct-to-video sci-fi goes, this particular War of the Worlds version is a perfectly entertaining little diversion. If you just love the Alien Invasion stories, you could certainly do a whole lot worse. In fact, you probably have within the past year alone."

== Sequel ==
On April 1, 2008, a sequel, War of the Worlds 2: The Next Wave, was released. C. Thomas Howell directed the film and reprised the role of George Herbert, and his son Dash Howell reprised the role of Alex. The film also starred Christopher Reid.

== See also ==
- War of the Worlds, Steven Spielberg's 2005 blockbuster which is also a contemporary adaptation of H. G. Wells' novel.
- H.G. Wells' The War of the Worlds, a more faithful, lower-budget film adaptation of the novel.
- The Day the Earth Stopped, another Asylum film starring C. Thomas Howell that features an invasion by extraterrestrials.
- List of works based on The War of the Worlds
