= Hold Your Breath (2012 film) =

American supernatural horror film

- Directed by: Jared Cohn
- Screenplay by: Geoff Meed
- Story by: Kenny Zinn
- Produced by: David Michael Latt; David Rimawi; Paul Bales
- Starring: Katrina Bowden; Randy Wayne
- Cinematography: Stuart Brereton
- Edited by: Bobby K. Richardson
- Music by: Chris Ridenhour
- Production companies: Global Asylum; Transformation Films
- Distributed by: The Asylum Productions
- Release date: October 5, 2012 (United States)
- Running time: 90 minutes
- Country: United States
- Language: English

Hold Your Breath (stylized as #HoldYourBreath) is a 2012 American supernatural horror film directed by Jared Cohn, starring Katrina Bowden and Randy Wayne. The film was released October 5, 2012, in United States. The film took place in Los Angeles, California.

== Synopsis ==
A group of friends on a weekend camping trip find themselves being picked off one by one when one member of the group refuses to abide by the urban myth that you can breathe in evil spirits when passing cemeteries.

The film opens with Van Hausen, a serial killer with a German accent, being executed in the electric chair with some of his victims' family members watching. He breaks free and manages to kill the warden before another officer finally puts him on the chair.

Present day, a group of friends are taking a road trip including Jerry (Katrina Bowden), Johnny (Randy Wayne), Jerry's sister Samantha (Lisa Younger), Kyle (Seth Cassell), Natasha (Erin Marie Hogan), Heath (Jordan Pratt-Thatcher) and Tony (Brad Slaughter). While driving near a cemetery Jerry starts to freak out and tells everyone to hold their breath saying that evil spirits can possess them if they don't. Everyone does except Kyle who is smoking pot which allows the spirit of Van Hausen to possess him. Kyle drops his pot on Johnny's lap which causes him to lose control and almost crash. Everyone except Kyle goes to the old prison where Van Hausen was executed. An officer shows up and Kyle kills him by making the officer's car explode with him in it. Everyone else walks up to the prison where Natasha and Johnny have sex and a killer appears in a metal mask only to be revealed as a prank by Heath. Jerry says that if Tony can strap himself into the electric chair she'll blow him. Once strapped in a lightning storm occurs and Tony starts to freak out and Johnny lets him out. All together they leave the prison and drive to the campsite where Van Hausen's spirit goes from Kyle to Tony. Tony and Samantha head back to the prison where he said he had left his bag and Tony strips Samantha half naked and ties her to a tree while he has an electric coil being pulled by the car cut her in half.

The group of friends begin to worry about them being gone so long and walk back to the prison where they find Samantha's body and Tony coming at them with a pitch fork. Goodchild Cemetery caretaker McBride (Steve Hanks) shoots and kills Tony telling the others if they want answers they must come with him to his house. Once there he explains that on the anniversary of Van Hausen's execution he wanders around the cemetery looking for a body to possess, McBride then asks if they held their breath. Johnny confesses that Kyle did not which makes Van Hausen's soul able to possess anyone. A possessed Jerry lunges at McBride then runs off when he tries to shoot her. McBride explains the only way to stop him is if Johnny comes alone with him and the others stay at the house. Now gone, Jerry comes back and takes Heath's eyes out with an electric mixer and Natasha and Kyle run off to find McBride and Jerry. McBride has the late Warden Wilkin's possess Johnny's body in order to find Van Hausen. Jerry kills Kyle and Van Hausen's soul then possesses both Natasha and Jerry's bodies in a fight to the death. Both souls leave the bodies and fight in a ghostly form. McBride tells Johnny, Jerry, and Natasha to take his car and leave and has both spirits possess him, causing an explosion. The three remaining friends make it back to the campsite by morning and Natasha wants to get out to use one of the camper's phones to call for help. Johnny locks the doors and stabs Natasha in the eye with a knife, clearly possessed by Van Hausen. He then looks to the backseat at Jerry while the movie ends with her screaming and Johnny saying “Hello gorgeous”.

== Cast ==
- Katrina Bowden as Jerry
- Randy Wayne as Johnny
- Erin Marie Hogan as Natasha
- Keith Allan as Van Hausen
- Steve Hanks as McBride
- Joshua Michael Allen as Young McBride
- Brad Slaughter as Tony
- Seth Cassell as Kyle
- Darin Cooper as Warden Wilkes
- Jordan-Pratt Thatcher as Heath
- Lisa Younger as Samantha
