= Deadlock (2021 film) =

2021 film by Jared Cohn

- Theatrical release poster
- Directed by: Jared Cohn
- Written by: Jared Cohn; Cam Cannon
- Produced by: Corey William Large; Johnny Messner
- Starring: Patrick Muldoon; Bruce Willis; Matthew Marsden; Michael DeVorzon; Ava Paloma; Stephen Sepher; Johnny Messner
- Cinematography: Brandon Cox
- Edited by: Paul Montez McDade
- Music by: Yagmur Kaplan
- Production company: 308 Ent
- Distributed by: Saban Films
- Release date: December 3, 2021
- Running time: 97 minutes
- Country: United States
- Language: English
- Box office: $12,473

Deadlock is a 2021 American action thriller film directed by Jared Cohn, starring Patrick Muldoon and Bruce Willis. It was released in the United States on December 3, 2021, by Saban Films.

== Synopsis ==
Wanted criminal Ron Whitlock leads a team of mercenaries on a mission of vengeance. Convinced that the local detectives are responsible for the death of one of his sons and the wrongful imprisonment of the other one for a botched drug bust, the merciless group brutally seizes a hydroelectric dam and holds everyone inside hostage. With a nearby town on the brink of massive flooding and destruction, it's up to a retired Army Ranger Mack Karr to save thousands of innocent lives before it's too late.

NSA are alerted and launch a full-scale military operation.

== Cast ==
- Patrick Muldoon as Mack Karr
- Bruce Willis as Ron Whitlock
- Matthew Marsden as Boone
- Michael DeVorzon as Smith
- Stephen Sepher as Gator
- Ava Paloma as Sophia
- Christopher Cleveland as Detective Lincoln Fulbright
- Kelcey Rose Weimer as Paula Fulbright
- Douglas Matthews as Tommy Blaylock
- Kelly Reiter as Amy Rakestraw
- Johnny Messner as Cranbrook
- Billy Jack Harlow as Decker
- Shep Dunn as Henchman Slim

== Production ==
Filming wrapped in Georgia in February 2021.

== Release ==
Saban Films acquired North American and UK rights to the film in June 2020.

=== Box office ===
As of November 11, 2022, Deadlock grossed $12,473 in Portugal and South Korea.

== Accolades ==
Bruce Willis was nominated for his performance in this movie, as he was for all movies he appeared in, in 2021, in the category Worst Performance by Bruce Willis in a 2021 Movie at the Golden Raspberry Awards. The category was later rescinded after he announced his retirement due to aphasia.
