= War of the Worlds 2: The Next Wave =

2008 film by C. Thomas Howell

- DVD cover
- Based on: The War of the Worlds by H. G. Wells
- Screenplay by: Eric Forsberg
- Story by: Steve Bevilacqua
- Directed by: C. Thomas Howell
- Starring: C. Thomas Howell; Christopher "Kid" Reid; Kim Little; Fred Griffith; Dashiell Howell
- Narrated by: C. Thomas Howell
- Music by: Ralph Rieckermann
- Original language: English

Production
- Producers: David Michael Latt, David Rimawi, Paul Bales
- Cinematography: Mark Atkins
- Editor: Ross H. Martin
- Running time: 85 minutes
- Budget: $500,000 (estimated)

Original release
- Network: Syfy
- Release: March 18, 2008

Related
- H. G. Wells' War of the Worlds

War of the Worlds 2: The Next Wave is a 2008 direct-to-DVD science fiction-thriller film by The Asylum, which premiered on Syfy on Tuesday March 18, 2008, directed by and starring C. Thomas Howell. The film was produced and distributed independently by The Asylum.

The film is a sequel to the film H. G. Wells' War of the Worlds, an adaptation of the 1898 H. G. Wells novel and mockbuster of the DreamWorks/Paramount adaptation of the same source. The film's tone and overall plot significantly differ from the first film and recycles elements from the novel.

The film is set two years after the initial alien invasion, following the remnants of the human race who launch an attack on the planet Mars to counter a second attack. C. Thomas Howell reprises his role as George Herbert.

== Plot ==
George Herbert explains that despite years of searching for extraterrestrial life mankind never expected aliens, which devastated human civilization into anarchy, would be killed by a lack of immunity to the bacteria in the human blood they consumed. Two years later, a town is seen populated with silent refugees including characters Shackleford and Sissy. Suddenly, three Tripods land in the city; apparently replacements for the walkers in the original attack having more legs. People are struck by a Heat-Ray. Shackleford takes a sample of Sissy's blood, with which he injects himself.

In Washington, American society has not recovered from the invasion. George Herbert recognises a familiar disturbance on the radio as the same heard during the first invasion and he reveals to Major Kramer and a team of scientists that his studies show that the aliens are creating a wormhole between Earth and Mars for another wave of attacks. A fleet of fighter jets, which appear to have deep-space flight capabilities, raid the planet Mars. George returns home for his son Alex, only to find a Tripod outside his home, which abducts Alex. He escapes to an abandoned city and wakes the next morning to find a man named Pete running from a Tripod. George throws himself before the machine, and wakes inside the machine with Pete. Both escape with Sissy, while the Martians begin a second invasion, attacking London and Paris. Major Kramer leads the fleet of jets to chase the alien mothership back to Mars.

George, Pete, and Sissy find themselves in the town from the start of the film. Shackleford reveals that the town is created by the Tripods for humans captured by Tripods to live on Mars. Shackleford wants to destroy the aliens in the same way bacteria did during the first invasion. Shackleford and Sissy are dying of a virus lethal to the Tripods, and he convinces George to inject his infected blood into himself. George and Pete are kidnapped again and arrive inside the mothership where they find Alex in a cocoon. There, George injects his infected blood into a pod holding a brain telepathically connected to all of the Tripods and thus deactivates the invasion. George, Pete, and Alex escape just as the mothership explodes. George survives the infection and the humans celebrate while listening to the radio which undergoes some static interference indicating a third invasion. The characters spend a few moments in silence before the film ends.

== Cast ==
- C. Thomas Howell as George Herbert, a play on H.G. Wells' first two names, Herbert George
- Christopher Reid as Peter Silverman
- Dashiell Howell as Alex Herbert
- Fred Griffith as Major Kramer

== Reception ==
Dread Central said the film, "ended up feeling like a lesser 1950’s science fiction movie, the kind that was long on ambition but short on entertainment value, though not a complete waste of time. In other words, meh."

Blu-Ray.com gave the film 1.5 stars out of 5, finding that while it opens well, it quickly falls apart, becoming a jumbled mess.

== Soundtrack ==
The film's music was composed by Ralph Reickermann, a former composer for The Asylum. The film features the single "You Came into my Life" which featured the vocals of singer John Brown Reese.
