= Titanic II (film) =

2010 film by Shane Van Dyke

- DVD cover. Note the ship in the image resembling RMS Queen Mary instead of Titanic.
- Directed by: Shane Van Dyke
- Written by: Shane Van Dyke
- Produced by: David Michael Latt
- Starring: Marie Westbrook; Shane Van Dyke; Bruce Davison; Brooke Burns
- Cinematography: Alexander Yellen
- Edited by: Austin Stock; Mark Atkins
- Production company: The Asylum
- Distributed by: The Asylum
- Release dates: 7 August 2010 (Australia); 24 August 2010 (US)
- Running time: 90 minutes
- Country: United States
- Language: English
- Budget: $500,000

Titanic II is a 2010 American drama disaster film written, directed by and starring Shane Van Dyke and distributed by The Asylum. It is not a sequel to the 1997 film. The film is set on a fictional replica Titanic that sets off exactly 100 years after the original ship's maiden voyage to perform the reverse route, but global warming and the forces of nature cause history to repeat itself on the same night, only on a more disastrous and deadly scale.

Titanic II was released direct-to-TV in Australia on August 7, 2010. It was released on August 25 in the United States to critically negative response, though the film's ensemble cast performances, particularly that of Bruce Davison, received praise. A supernatural horror-themed sequel, Titanic 666, was released twelve years later, in 2022.

== Plot ==
In the Arctic Ocean off the Helheim Glacier in Greenland, a person is surfing on waves created by chunks of ice falling off the glacier, caused by the effects of global warming. A huge chunk of ice falls into the water, creating an especially large wave. The surfer tries to escape the wave, but it overwhelms him and he drowns. United States Coast Guard Captain James Maine is sent to investigate in Greenland. While he is there with Dr. Kim Patterson (Brooke Burns), a huge chunk of ice falls into the ocean.

On April 10, 2012, 100 years after the departure of the RMS Titanic on its maiden voyage, a new, similar-looking luxury cruise liner, the RMS Titanic II, is christened. She embarks on her maiden voyage using the same route the Titanic took 100 years before, albeit in reverse direction (from New York City to Southampton). The ship's captain Will Howard (D.C. Douglas) is in command. The ship's designer, Hayden Walsh (Shane Van Dyke), and the ship's nurses Amy Maine (Marie Westbrook) and Kelly Wade (Michelle Glavan) are on board.

During the Atlantic crossing, the crew is alerted of the tsunami by James Maine. Maine warns that any ice in the area will be moved with the tsunami. In a rush to get back to shore, one of the engines is damaged. Immediately following, the wave and a large iceberg ram into the ship, leaving many passengers injured. The entire starboard side of the ship and the starboard lifeboat ramps are crushed. Hayden and Amy return below decks and find Kelly badly injured. The three escape and move towards the upper decks.

Meanwhile, back up north, a much larger tsunami is created by yet another glacier. During the evacuation, immense pressure is placed on the ship's turbines, causing it to eventually explode, killing many passengers and crew, including the ship captain Will Howard. The explosion also causes an immense fire on the Titanic II, which is sinking by its bow (similar to the first Titanic) while also listing at a shallow angle to its starboard side.

Amy gets a call from her father, who warns her of the second wave and to stay out of the lifeboats, as they will be washed away by the wave. Maine orders the three to move to the ship's onboard diving facility. Kelly is later killed when a very heavy door crushes her. Hayden and Amy make it to the diving facility when they hear somebody trapped. They try to help him, but he dies behind a jammed door. When Hayden and Amy go inside the diving facility, the second wave hits the ship, capsizing it, and destroying the lifeboats.

The ship's diving facility only has one oxygen tank and scuba suit, which Hayden gives to Amy. Before sacrificing his life for her, Hayden kisses Amy and with his last words tells her to resuscitate him should he drown before they are rescued. Captain Maine arrives to rescue Amy and Hayden by swimming inside the ship as it sinks. His helicopter runs out of fuel and crashes as Patterson gets in a life raft. With the ship flooded, Titanic II finally sinks. After James rescues them, Amy attempts to resuscitate Hayden but it is too late. Amy, as well as an unknown number of injured passengers whom Hayden previously ordered his helicopter to take, are the only known survivors of the disaster.

== Cast ==
- Marie Westbrook as Amy Maine, one of the ship's nurses and Hayden's love interest
- Shane Van Dyke as Hayden Walsh, the ship's owner and designer
- Bruce Davison as Captain James Maine, Amy's father and a helicopter commander of the U.S. Coast Guard
- Michelle Glavan as Kelly Wade, another of the ship's nurses and Amy's colleague and friend
- D. C. Douglas as Captain Will Howard, the ship's captain
- Brooke Burns as Dr. Kim Patterson, a glaciologist
- Josh Roman as Elliot Snipes, the pilot of Captain Maine's CH-53 Super Stallion helicopter

== Production ==
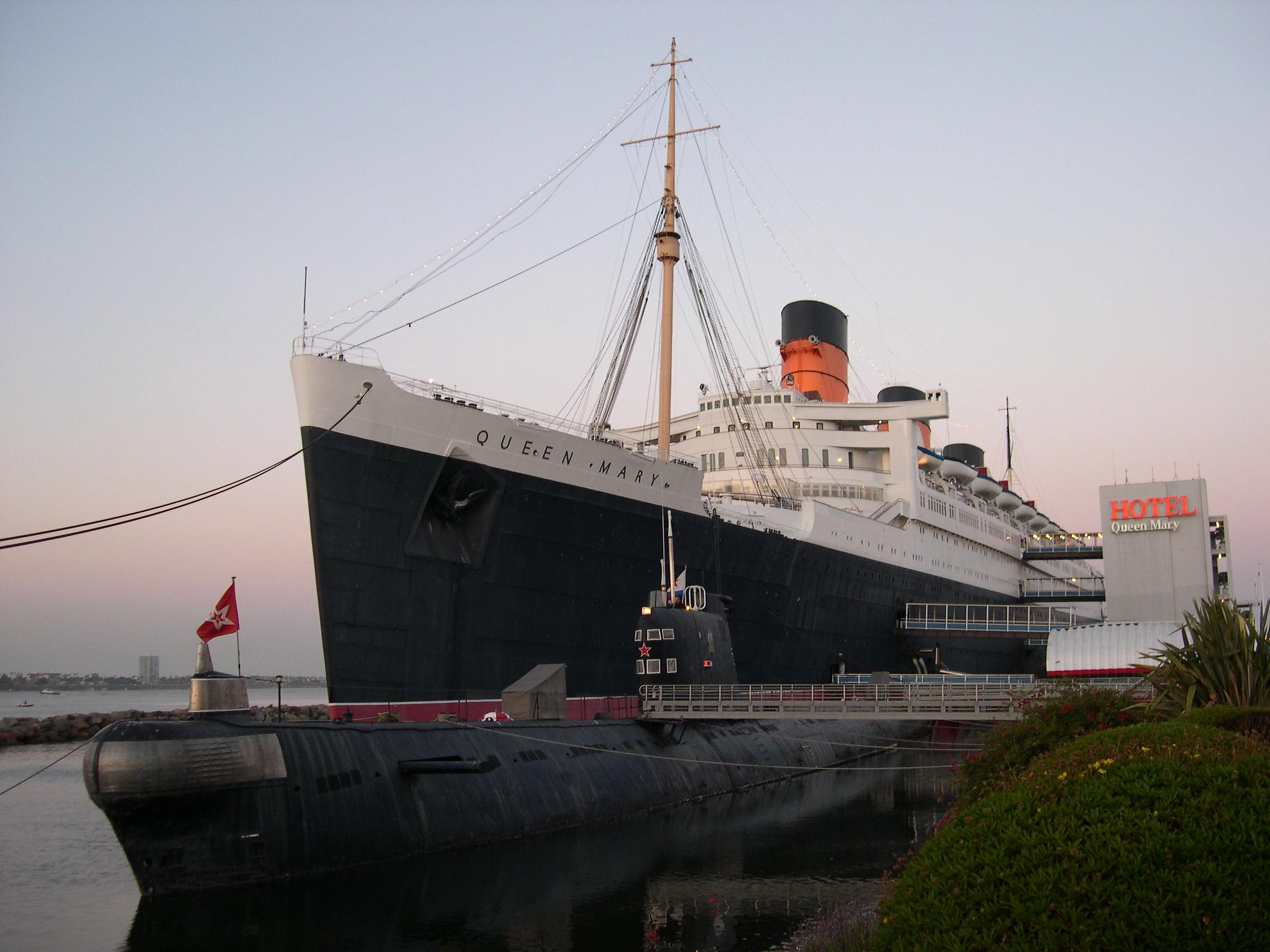
The RMS Queen Mary, which in the movie was used as the RMS Titanic II

The RMS Queen Mary, which is permanently docked as a hotel ship and tourist attraction in Long Beach, California, was used as a stand-in for Titanic II during the departure scenes and some of its interiors. The ship had previously been used as stand-ins for the fictional similarly fated ocean liner SS Poseidon in The Poseidon Adventure (1972) and the original RMS Titanic in the 1979 television miniseries S.O.S. Titanic.

== Reception ==
The film has received a negative response from most film critics. On the website TheCriticalCritics.com, the film was reviewed as being "a mixed bag" since "it's better than one might expect, but not as good as one might hope." Though panned generally as "pretty lackluster" as well as "riddled with disaster movie clichés", the performances of some cast members were highlighted for praise, particularly Bruce Davison as a veteran U.S. Coast Guard captain. The movie as a whole was given a rating of "Don't Bother".

Dread Central said in a review "Take away the novelty of the Titanic II name, and you're left with a rather trite Poseidon Adventure-ish disaster flick made on the cheap. It's not good enough to be engrossing, nor is it made to be intentionally bad, and even as silly as the scenario is, none of it is ever quite silly enough to provide unintentional fun. Action and suspense are constantly hampered by the low budget and the special effects answer the question, 'What would James Cameron's Titanic have been like if most of the digital effects looked like animation from a Wii cutscene?'".
