= Tinarie van Wyk-Loots =

South African actress

- Born: Tinarie van Wyk; 17 December 1980 (age 45); Johannesburg, South Africa
- Occupation: Actress
- Years active: 2000–present

Tinarie van Wyk-Loots (born 17 December 1980 in Johannesburg, South Africa) is an actress known for her roles in H. G. Wells' War of the Worlds and Mojave Phone Booth.

She has acted a lot in the theatre. In 2018 she directed her first play Swerfgoed by Bauke Snyman in Afrikaans in Cape Town.

== Filmography ==
=== Film ===
Year	Title	Role	Notes
2003	The Company You Keep	Benecia	
2005	H. G. Wells' War of the Worlds	Felicity Herbert	
2005	The Poseidon Adventure	Aimee Anderson	
2006	Le Rainbow Warrior	Journaliste Auckland	
2006	Mojave Phone Booth	Mary	Main role
2007	'n Roos vir Mari	Wife of Jan-Hendrik	Short film
2008	Hansie: A True Story	Hester "Cronjé" Parsons	Main role
2009	Hond se dinges	Lara van Niekerk	Main role
2009	Angels Burn in the Sun	Kim	Short film
2011	Beauty	Linda van Heerden	
2013	Zulu	Claire Fletcher	
2013	Jimmy in Pienk	Rika	
2013	Die Bach-motief	Celeste Groenewald	Short film
2015	The Discovery of Fire	The Woman	Short film
2016	The Odyssey	Assistante TV	
2017	Performances		Filming
2020	Gat in die Muur (Hole in the Wall)	Ava	

=== Television ===
Year	Title	Role	Notes
2008	Transito	Thaba le Roux	Main role 10 episodes
2008	Silent Witness	Sian	Episode 12.99-100 "Finding Rachel"
2009	The Philanthropist	Mrs. Whitmere	Episode: San Diego
2011	Women in Love	Samantha	TV Mini Series; Episode 1.2
2013	Jungle Beat	Fish	Voice role Episode: Tiny Nubbles
2016	Jungle Beat Explorers	Rita	Voice role Episode: Hot Air 2
2016	Munki and Trunk	Rita	Voice role Episode: Queen of the Swingers
2022	Recipes for Love and Murder	Martine Burger	TV Series (Supporting)

== Awards and nominations ==
Year	Association	Category	Work	Result	Ref
2021	South African Film and Television Awards	Best Actress – TV Drama	4 Mure	Nominated	
2022	South African Film and Television Awards	Best Actress – Feature Film	Gat in Die Muur	Won	
