= Drew Talbert =

American social media influencer

- Born: Nashville, Tennessee, US
- Occupations: Influencer, actor, comedian, waiter
- Spouse: Andrea Kelley
- Children: 2

Drew Talbert is an American actor, comedian, social media influencer, and former waiter. He is best known for his series Bistro Huddy, about a fictional restaurant. He plays every character in this series.

== Biography ==
Talbert was raised in Nashville, Tennessee, in a religious family, and was homeschooled. The family television broke when Talbert was 2 years old, and his father, instead of replacing it, stated that "God wanted to get rid of it". This resulted in Talbert becoming his "family's default source of entertainment"; he wrote and filmed fake newscasts, sketches, and music videos, often using his grandmother's wigs. He attended Lipscomb University, where he earned a degree in English and Theater.

Talbert moved back and forth between Nashville and Los Angeles in his twenties, and struggled with drug addiction. He also worked as a waiter during this time. He went clean in 2014, after meeting Andrea Kelley, who he went on to marry. During this time, he continued working as a waiter and worked as an actor, a writer, and an improv performer, at The Groundlings. He also taught sketch comedy and improvisation, and worked as an assistant editor for The Asylum. He worked as a server for over two decades.

Logo for Bistro Huddy

During the pandemic, as the restaurant Talbert had worked at and The Groundlings both shut down, he began creating TikTok reels. After a skit about working in a restaurant went viral, he began focusing on this. At first, it was just a sketch idea, but with the help of his wife, who also co-writes the series, he began developing characters and turning this into the sitcom series Bistro Huddy. The series is named after his son Hudson. He has stated that this series is what made him able to afford owning a home.

In this series, Talbert plays all the characters, utilizing wigs and clothing to denote the characters. Some of these characters are inspired by real people, including manager Terry, inspired by an old manager, and a waiter Nicole, inspired by his wife. She has been described as the favorite character. He donates all the revenue from merchandise of this series to nonprofits.

Talbert commented negatively on the efforts to ban TikTok in the United States in 2025. As of 2026, he had over 10 million followers across multiple platforms. He was featured in TikTok's Discover list in 2026 for his creations. He also attended the Cannes Lions International Festival of Creativity in 2026.

== Personal life ==
Talbert has 2 children.
