= Cupid (film) =

- Directed by: Tate Taylor
- Screenplay by: Carey Van Dyke; Shane Van Dyke
- Produced by: John Norris; Tate Taylor; Ryan Donnell Smith
- Starring: Catherine Zeta-Jones; Daisy Ridley; Darren Criss; Travis Fimmel; Judy Greer; Milana Vayntrub
- Production company: Time Zone Capital
- Countries: United States; United Kingdom
- Language: English

Cupid is an upcoming psychological thriller film directed and produced by Tate Taylor from a screenplay by Carey and Shane Van Dyke. It stars Catherine Zeta-Jones, Daisy Ridley, Darren Criss, Travis Fimmel, Judy Greer, and Milana Vayntrub.

== Premise ==
Follows a couple trying to repair their marriage at the home of an unorthodox counselor. What starts as a hopeful weekend quickly turns dark as her methods become crueler and more dangerous.

== Cast ==
- Catherine Zeta-Jones
- Daisy Ridley
- Darren Criss
- Travis Fimmel
- Judy Greer
- Milana Vayntrub

== Production ==
In February 2026, it was announced that Tate Taylor would be directing a psychological thriller film, with Carey and Shane Van Dyke writing the screenplay, and Catherine Zeta-Jones starring in the lead role. Jon Hamm served as an executive producer through his production company.

In November 2026, Daisy Ridley, Darren Criss, Travis Fimmel, Judy Greer, and Milana Vayntrub joined the cast. Principal photography began on October 21, 2026, in Natchez, Mississippi, and it is scheduled to wrap on November 23.
