= Hole in the Wall (2016 film) =

2015 South African drama film directed by Jans Rautenbach

- Directed by: André Odendaal; Johan Vorster
- Screenplay by: Susan Coetzer
- Produced by: André Odendaal; Johan Vorster
- Distributed by: Urban Brew Studios; Indigenous Film Distribution; Netflix
- Release date: 2016
- Running time: 105 minutes
- Country: South Africa
- Language: Afrikaans

Hole in the Wall (Afrikaans: Gat in Die Muur) is a 2016 South African Afrikaans-language independent drama film directed and produced by André Odendaal and Johan Vorster from a screenplay by Susan Coetzer. After a limited release in 2016, the film was distributed worldwide by Netflix in 2020. The film won the 2021 South African Film and Television Award for Best Actress in a feature film (for Tinarie van Wyk-Loots), from three nominations, all for acting.

== Cast ==
- Andre Odendaal as Rian
- Tinarie van Wyk-Loots as Ava
- Nicholas Campbell as Ben
- Bheki Mkhwane as Toni
