= Atlantic Rim (film) =

- DVD cover
- Directed by: Jared Cohn
- Screenplay by: Richard Lima; Thunder Levin; Hank Woon, Jr.
- Story by: Jared Cohn
- Produced by: David Michael Latt; David Rimawi; Paul Bales; Christopher Ray
- Starring: Graham Greene; David Chokachi; Treach; Jackie Moore
- Cinematography: Alexander Yellen
- Edited by: Rob Pallatina
- Music by: Chris Ridenhour
- Production company: The Asylum
- Distributed by: The Asylum
- Release dates: June 24, 2013 (United Kingdom); July 9, 2013 (United States)
- Running time: 85 minutes
- Country: United States
- Language: English
- Budget: $500,000

Atlantic Rim (also known as Attack from Beneath, Attack from the Atlantic Rim and From the Sea) is a 2013 American science fiction monster film produced by The Asylum and directed by Jared Cohn. Shot in Pensacola, Florida, the film stars Graham Greene, David Chokachi, Treach, and Jackie Moore.

The film was released direct-to-DVD on June 24, 2013 in the United Kingdom, and on July 9 in the United States. In the tradition of The Asylum's catalog, Atlantic Rim is a mockbuster of the film Pacific Rim. The film received generally negative reviews from critics.

== Plot ==
Following the mysterious disappearance of an oil rig caused by seismic subduction and a reconnaissance mini-submarine in the Gulf of Mexico, scientist Dr. Margaret Adams initiates the Armada Program, which consists of giant robots designed for deep sea rescue. The three robots – piloted by Red, Tracy and Jim – dive nearly 800 fathoms to the sea bed, where they not only discover the mangled remains of the oil rig, but encounter the monster that brought it down. Red pursues the monster, against orders from Admiral Hadley, prompting Hadley to order every naval fleet on the East Coast to converge on the oil rig's site. Red emerges on a beach to warn the bystanders to leave the area; he is suddenly attacked from behind by the monster as their fight takes its toll on the city. An F/A-18 Hornet piloted by Spitfire assists Red in taking the monster down. Red, however, is arrested for disobeying a direct order. He is locked in solitary confinement until he is briefly released by Adm. Hadley and later given a medal of honor for his heroic actions, before serving the rest of his confinement.

Later, Hadley is informed by Sheldon Geise of a top-secret sonar program that discovered the monsters, which are hundreds of millions of years old and lay their eggs on a mixture of crude oil and saltwater. Two eggs have been discovered, one of which hatched into the monster that Red and Spitfire killed. Hadley orders a search for the other egg, but he is too late, as it has already hatched, with the second monster, much bigger than the first, feeding on the corpse of the first monster and destroying a whole naval fleet before wreaking havoc on the city. As the monster attacks the naval base, Tracy and Jim scramble to spring Red out of solitary before they are picked up by Lieutenant Wexler. Meanwhile, Geise informs Hadley that the President has authorized a nuclear strike on the monster, but Hadley defies that decision and orders everyone to evacuate the base. The monster retreats after a Northrop Grumman B-2 Spirit drops a payload on it. Hadley is later informed that another egg has hatched off the Atlantic Coast.

Adams gives the trio special "halo" headbands that neurally link them to their robots, increasing their reflexes by using their direct body movements instead of joysticks. The system's downside is the pilot feeling pain when their robots are damaged. After a crash course on the new system, the trio fly their robots to New York City to battle the monster. Following numerous refusals by Hadley to launch a nuclear strike, Geise orders the USS Virginia to launch a warhead. Red intercepts the missile and jams its frequency, saving the city from a nuclear holocaust. In retaliation, Geise threatens to shut down the robots, but is quickly subdued by Wexler, despite shooting Hadley in the arm. During the battle, Tracy loses consciousness when her neural level goes critical. Jim takes Tracy to safety while Red grabs the warhead and the monster before flying them to the atmosphere. He then kicks the monster into deep space, detonating the warhead in the process and sending him crashing back to Earth. The trio and Hadley celebrate by heading to the local bar for some tequila shots.

== Cast ==
- Graham Greene as Admiral Hadley
- David Chokachi as Captain Garret Waters / "Red"
- Treach as Jim / "Green"
- Jackie Moore as Tracy Hendrix / "Blue"
- Nicole Alexandra Shipley as Stone
- Jared Cohn as "Spitfire"
- Jinhi Evans as Dr. Quinn Baker
- Steven Marlow as Sheldon "Snake" Geise
- Nicole Dickson as Dr. Margaret Adams
- Demetrius Stear as Lieutenant Wexler
- Larry Gamell Jr. as Smith
- William Shannon Williams as Captain Dager
- Joseph Brown as Motion Capture For Robot / Paramedic

== Production ==
Atlantic Rim was originally planned to be shot at Naval Air Station Pensacola in Florida, but The Asylum were denied permission to film at the base after a high-ranking official read the script and disagreed with the portrayal of the soldiers. As a result, the production team relocated to a private helicopter airport that served as a stand-in for at least seven locations for the film. The film's script underwent at least nine rewrites during production due to weather conditions and the last-minute relocation.

== Reception ==
Dave Pace of Fangoria gave the film two out of four stars, calling it "a testament to why there aren't many live action giant robot vs. monster movies. It's a very difficult thing to do right and keep the audience on your side. Atlantic Rim manages to be enjoyable as a bit of a goof and works on the 'so bad it's good' level." Dread Central gave the film three out of five stars, describing it as "the ultimate monster movie about booze-hounding broskis in battle bots saving New York City from a crazy-eyed giant sea beast that frequently appears to be merely a lost animal, confused and irritated that these metal men won't stop hitting it."

It is one of six films featured in Season 12 of Mystery Science Theater 3000, and was the first film released in the 21st century to be riffed on the show.

== Future ==
=== Sequel ===
On October 5, 2017, it was announced that a sequel had wrapped filming. The film, entitled Atlantic Rim: Resurrection, was released in March 2018. Following from the first film, it was a mockbuster of Pacific Rim Uprising.

=== Spinoff ===
One of the Armada Suits from the Atlantic Rim films appears in the 2022 film 2025 Armageddon, a crossover film released to celebrate The Asylum's 25th anniversary. It is sent by alien invaders to attack Earth, but is captured by humanity and used as a weapon against other Asylum monsters sent by the aliens.
