= Erin Marie Hogan =

American actress and activist

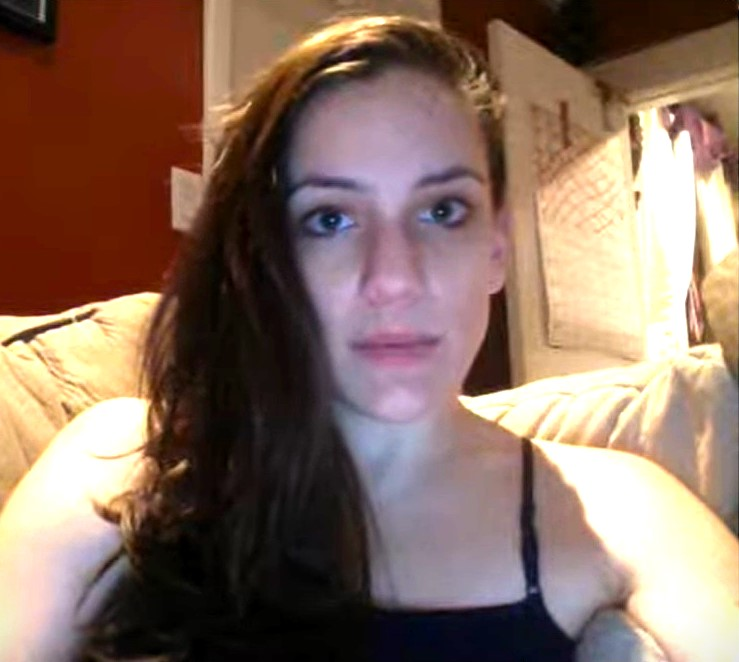
- Hogan on her YouTube channel in 2014
- Born: September 22, 1985 (age 40); St. Louis, Missouri, United States
- Education: Webster University, Soldan High School
- Occupations: Actress, activist
- Movement: Mental health awareness, animal rights
- Website: erinmariehogan.com

Erin Marie Hogan (born September 22, 1985) is an American actress and activist from St. Louis, Missouri. Hogan is mostly seen in direct-to-video horror films and American cable television. She is a mental health advocate, who in 2015 announced that she battles depression and anxiety.

== Early life ==
Born near The Hill, in St. Louis, Missouri, to parents Michael Patrick and Jane Christine Hogan. Hogan began singing, acting, and dancing at a young age. She was enrolled in the Ballet Conservatory of Saint Louis where she studied before moving to COCA to continue her training. During high school at Soldan International Studies High School, Hogan began singing competitively and performing in community and underground theatre. She later received her degree in Film and Video Production from Webster University with a minor in Music. During these years, Hogan worked as a theme park performer, competitive singer, and aerial artist.

== Career ==
After moving to Los Angeles to pursue acting further, she first came to attention with her role as Samantha Finley in Paranormal Entity (2009), a "mockbuster" exploiting the publicity of the 2007 film Paranormal Activity. The film was done in a "found footage" style, causing a bit of confusion as many people believed she was actually dead.

On television, Hogan appeared on five episodes of the 2015 season of Ray Donovan. In film, she featured in one of the six segments of The Theatre Bizarre (2011) and starred in Hold Your Breath (2012). Her portrayal of Linda Kasabian in House of Manson (2015) earned her positive reviews on horror websites. She received positive reviews for her role in the paranormal thriller Dwelling, with many reviewers hailing her portrayal of "Ellie" as her best performance to date.

== Filmography ==
=== Film ===
Film	Year	Role	Notes
Say Goodnight	2007	Lydia	Some Scenes Deleted
Paranormal Entity	2009	Samantha Finley	Direct-to-video
6 Guns	2010	Scarlet	Direct-to-video
Agent Steele	2010	Agent Veronica	Short film
The Confined	2010	Jackie	Short film
Zombies and Assholes	2011	Kaitlin	Short film
Hold Your Breath	2011	Natasha	Limited Theatrical Release
The Theatre Bizarre	2011	Test Tube Baby	One segment of Horror Anthology
Axeman	2013	Liz	Direct-to-video
Red Revenge	2014	Amanda Torres	Direct-to-video (Japan)
Throwdown	2014	Amanda Torres	Direct-to-video
House of Manson	2015	Linda Kasabian	Direct-to-video
Evil Within	2015	Bettina	Direct-to-video
The Bet	2016	Kaylee Listwan	Direct-to-video
Dwelling	2017	Ellie	Direct-to-video
Two Faced	2017	Josie	Direct-to-video
Internet Comment Etiquette 2020 Halloween Special	2020	Goth Girl	Short film

=== Television ===
Show	Episodes	Role	Notes
Ray Donovan	5	Co-Star	Season 3
Paul Goetz's Last Ditch Effort	8	Sandy Berkins	For YouTube
Seven Lives X-posed	8	Julia	Playboy TV
Choose Your Own Adventure	4	Secret Agent	Nerdist.com
The Bold and the Beautiful	1	Friend #2	Episode 1.6387
Everyday Gay	1	Michelle	Pilot Episode
Femme Fatales	1	Emily	Season 1: "Girls Gone Dead"
Battle of Hogwarts	1	Hogsmeade Resident	Chapter 1: "Artifacts"
1000 Ways to Die	5	Wendy	"Better Them Than Us" and "Getting a Rise From the Dead"
Kingdom Come	4	Layla	For Vimeo

== Discography ==
Album title	Year	Type	Band or Group	Role
Volcal-ize of the Tiger	2004	LP	Soldan Intl' HS Choir	Vocalist
Act Out/Lay Me Down	2005	Demo	Failside	Vocalist
Goodbye Darling	2006	Single	Failside	Vocalist
Fully Attractive	2007	LP	Tight Pants Syndrome	Vocalist
Don't Panic	2008	LP	Tight Pants Syndrome	Vocalist
Singles	2009	LP	Tight Pants Syndrome	Vocalist
