= The Asylum =

American film studio and distributor

- Type: Private
- Founded: 1997; 29 years ago
- Founder: David Michael Latt; David Rimawi; Sherri Strain
- Headquarters: Burbank, California, U.S.
- Key people: David Michael Latt (president); David Rimawi (CEO); Paul Bales (COO)
- Divisions: Faith Films
- Website: theasylum.cc

The Asylum is an American independent film production and distribution company based in Burbank, California. It produces low-budget direct-to-video films, in particular mockbusters, which capitalize on the popularity of major studio films with similar titles and premises.

The Asylum produces as many low-budget films as quickly as possible, which earn around $150,000 to $250,000 in profit. It produces dozens of films each year and generates millions of dollars, and says it has never lost money on a film. The Asylum spends between 12 days to two months shooting the film (for total making of a film they average 4 months), and as it is not affiliated with any industry guilds other than SAG-AFTRA, their employees will sometimes work up to 20–22 hours a day.

Initially founded as a distribution company for low-budget drama films, the Asylum switched to in-house productions in the mid-2000s due to competition from larger studios such as Lionsgate Films. In 2005, the Asylum released the film H. G. Wells' War of the Worlds the day before Steven Spielberg film War of the Worlds. Blockbuster ordered 100,000 copies, which inspired the Asylum to focus on mockbusters. This led to a partnership with the television channel Syfy, and later, with the rise of video on demand (VOD) services in the early 2010s, partnerships with Pluto TV and Tubi.

The Asylum's greatest success came in 2013 with the film Sharknado, about a waterspout that lifts sharks out of the ocean and drops them over Los Angeles. The over-the-top premise went viral, and led to the creation of the Sharknado franchise. In response to the popularity of Sharknado, Syfy commissioned the Asylum to produce the zombie television series Z Nation, which ran for five seasons.

== History ==
=== 1997–2009 ===
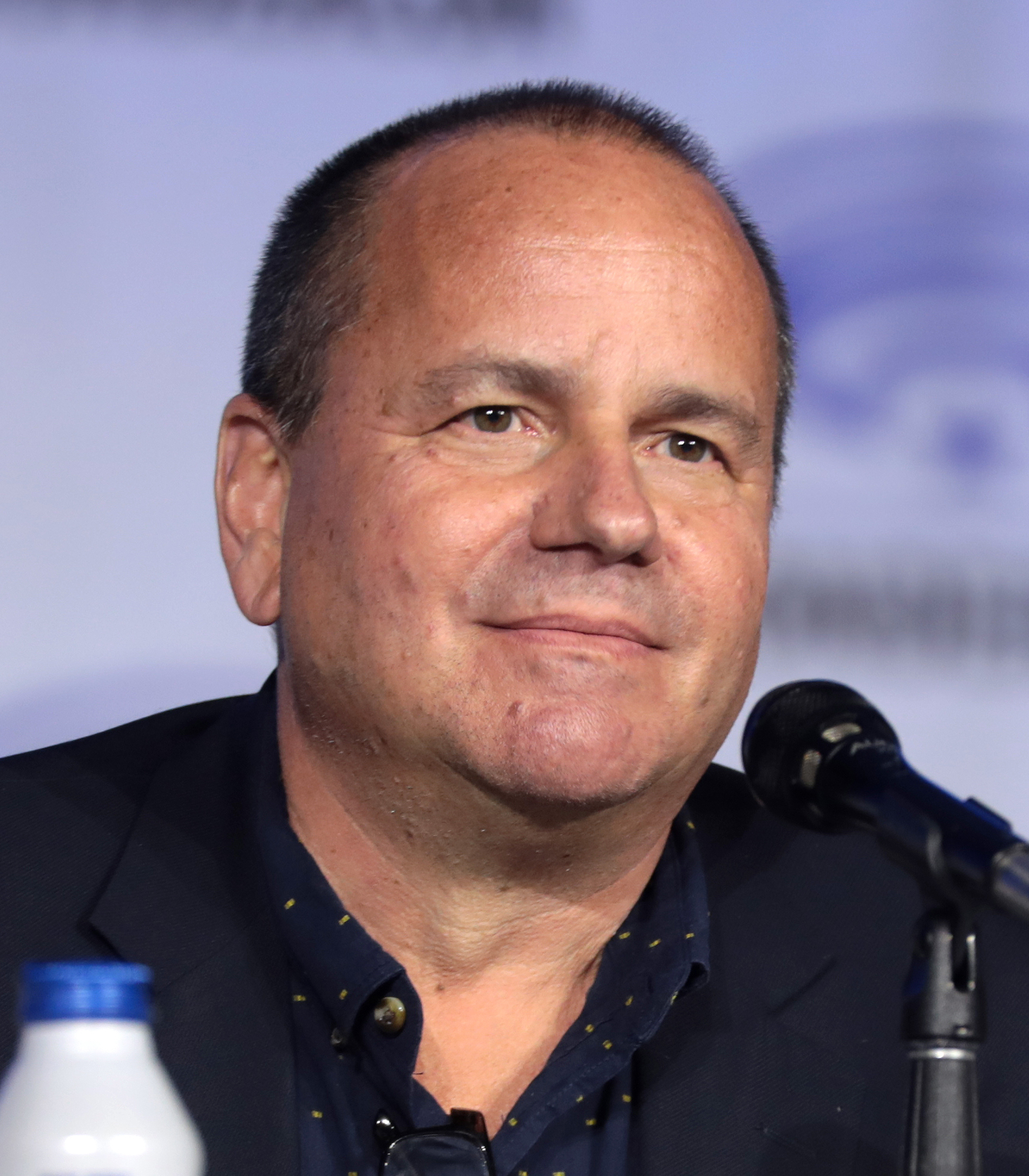
The Asylum's chief operating officer Paul Bales

The Asylum was founded in 1997 by David Latt, David Rimawi, and Sherri Strain. Rimawi and Strain had been fired by Village Roadshow Pictures, and Latt was working for an education software company called Chimera Multimedia. Latt and Rimawi had previously worked together on the 1992 film Sorority House Party, and together with Strain, launched the Asylum as a film distribution company. The Asylum's first release was Bellyfruit in 1999, a comedy drama about a teen pregnancy. The company's initial goal was to distribute low-budget drama films like Bellyfruit to video rental chains like Blockbuster and Hollywood Video, but their approach changed in the early 2000s, as video rental chains were more interested in direct-to-video horror films. Also in 1999, The Asylum partnered with Australian distributor Tribe Enterprises and video rental chain Hollywood Video to set up the First Rites label. The Asylum struggled to break into the distribution market, as larger companies like Lionsgate Films would routinely offer filmmakers more money. This led to a change in their business model in 2002, with a focus on in-house productions. Their goal was to produce one film per month, starting with the 2002 crime thriller King of the Ants. Strain left the company in 2002, and was replaced by former Screen Actors Guild employee Paul Bales.

According to Film International, the Asylum's first hit film was Vampires vs. Zombies in 2004. Although the film was marketed as an adaptation of the 1872 novella Carmilla, Vampires vs. Zombies's poster bore a striking resemblance to Freddy vs. Jason's poster, which came out the year before. Film International writer Wheeler Winston Dixon described Vampires vs. Zombies as the Asylum's first mockbuster, a film that closely resembles another film with a similar title and premise in order to capitalize on its popularity. Around the same time, Latt began working on an adaptation of the 1898 novel The War of the Worlds, but learned that Steven Spielberg was also working on a film adaptation of the novel. Latt was prepared to end production until Blockbuster ordered 100,000 copies of the film, roughly seven to eight times the normal order for Asylum films. Latt's film, titled H. G. Wells' War of the Worlds, was released on June 28, 2005, one day before Spielberg's film.

Emboldened by the success of H. G. Wells' War of the Worlds, the Asylum started producing low-budget films to capitalize on the popularity of similar major studio films. The Asylum marketed their films as "tie-ins", although journalists and critics often referred to them as rip-offs or mockbusters. Among the company's early releases within this business model were King of the Lost World (based on King Kong), Snakes on a Train (based on Snakes on a Plane), The Da Vinci Treasure (based on The Da Vinci Code), and Transmorphers (based on The Terminator not Transformers). In 2008, the Asylum increased their meager production budget, and partnered with Syfy for a television release of The Day the Earth Stopped, based on The Day the Earth Stood Still. 20th Century Fox filed a cease and desist letter against the Asylum for the similarities between The Day the Earth Stopped and The Day the Earth Stood Still, although nothing came of the letter. Film titles are usually not protected under United States trademark law, which allows the Asylum to produce films with similar titles so long as they can argue that they did not try to deceive consumers.

=== 2010–present ===
With the rise of video on demand (VOD) services in the early 2010s, the Asylum focused on digital distribution. Since VOD services would often categorize their films in alphabetical order, the Asylum added numbers or typographical symbols to the beginning of their film titles in order to be seen first, such as #1 Cheerleader Camp and 2-Headed Shark Attack. The Asylum also released the film Hold Your Breath (stylized as #HoldYourBreath) in 10 AMC Theatres, as VOD services prioritized films with theatrical releases. Pluto TV became the studio's largest source of revenue, with an entire channel dedicated to Asylum films. Another VOD service, Tubi, commissioned the Asylum to produce 12 original films after the surprise popularity of the film Titanic II. Rimawi estimated that by 2012, 70 percent of the studio's films were original ideas.

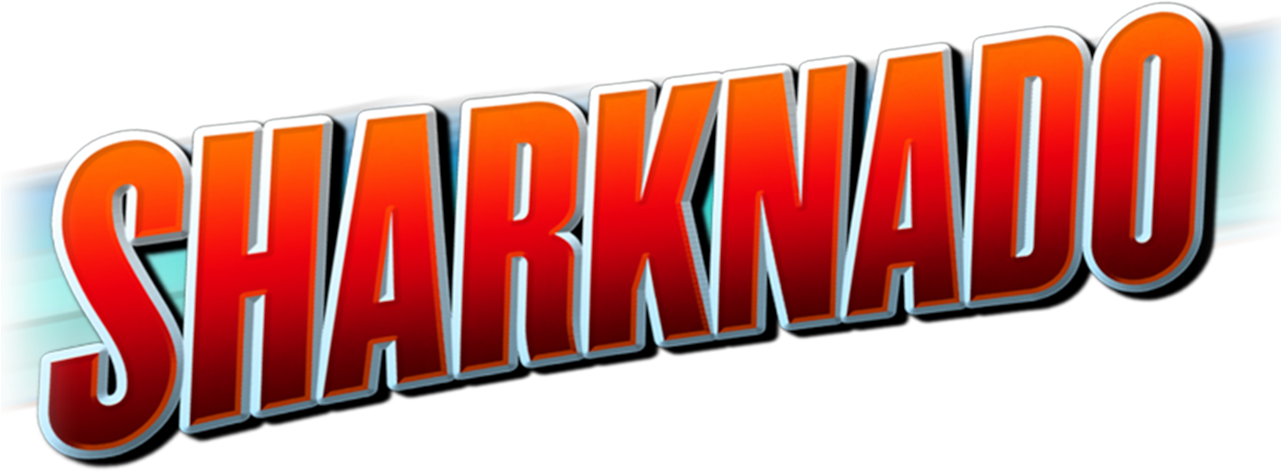
The logo for the Sharknado series

The Asylum's biggest success came in 2013 with the film Sharknado, which is about a waterspout that lifts sharks out of the ocean and drops them over Los Angeles. The over-the-top premise went viral, with over 387,000 mentions on social media. Today co-hosts held a dramatic reading of some of the film's lines, and the mayor of Los Angeles Eric Garcetti joked about it on Twitter. Sharknado spawned five sequels, and when combined with merchandising and licensing sales, nearly quadrupled the Asylum's revenue from three years earlier. According to Bales, "Up until that point, even with the notoriety that we had, if you'd speak to anyone and be like, 'Hey, I'm a filmmaker, have you seen anything I've made?' the answer would be, 'No,' but with Sharknado we became known." Latt added, "We still talk about how to exploit it in every production meeting."

In response to the popularity of Sharknado, Syfy commissioned the Asylum to produce a zombie television series called Z Nation, the studio's first foray into episodic content. Loosely based on the Asylum film Rise of the Zombies, Z Nation revolves around a group of survivors who escort a man who is immune to the zombie virus to the last known Centers for Disease Control research lab. Journalists often compared Z Nation to The Walking Dead, especially given the Asylum's penchant for mockbusters. Z Nation ran for five seasons on Syfy, and was followed by the spinoff series Black Summer on Netflix. Bales felt that the production costs for Z Nation were too high, and decided that the Asylum's next potential television series, titled Crisis Earth, would be written as three separate low-budget films that can then be cut into six individual episodes. The script for Crisis Earth went up for sale at the 2022 American Film Market.

== Approach to filmmaking ==
The Asylum's business model revolves around producing as many low-budget films as quickly as possible. Their films usually have a budget of $250,000 to $500,000, and earn $150,000 to $250,000 in profit. Since the Asylum produces dozens of films every year, this model generates millions of dollars. From October 2011 to October 2012, the Asylum's revenue totaled $12,000,000 for a 15 percent profit margin. This model is so successful, that Rimawi claims that they have never lost money on a film. Rimawi stated, "One of the reasons we've remained in business for 25 years is that we make a movie for exactly less than we think we can earn from it ... People say all the time, 'Why don't you make a $20 million original production?' And our answer is because we'd like to stay in business."

The Asylum spends around 3-5 months making a film. Paul Bales says : "From the point that we come up with a concept to the film actually being released, it's about four months." It starts with the Asylum soliciting 100-word pitches from freelance screenwriters based on a story concept that the studio's distribution affiliates want. As journalist Amanda Hess explained, "If a Japanese DVD company wants a submarine, and Blockbuster needs a monster, the Asylum will make a sailors-meet-sea creature movie, then tweak the concept further to sell to all its potential platforms." The studio then chooses the best pitch, and the chosen screenwriter produces a draft within 10 days. Asylum films are almost always serious in tone despite the far-fetched plots. The first script for Sharknado featured a lot of self-aware humor, but screenwriter Thunder Levin said that the Asylum wanted every comedic line removed and left a strongly worded note that reiterated that Sharknado was not a comedy film.

If the Asylum is making a mockbuster, they will target larger films that are based on works or characters in the public domain, such as Sherlock Holmes or Thor. Despite the similar titles, the scripts for Asylum mockbuster films often have little to nothing to do with the larger film they are based on. Rolf Potts of The New York Times noted that although the title of the Asylum film Transmorphers was a clear imitation of Transformers, Transmorphers only occasionally features shape-shifting robots and devotes more time to a lesbian subplot. Latt said this is because the studio's writers only have a brief outline of what the larger film is going to be about from promotional material.

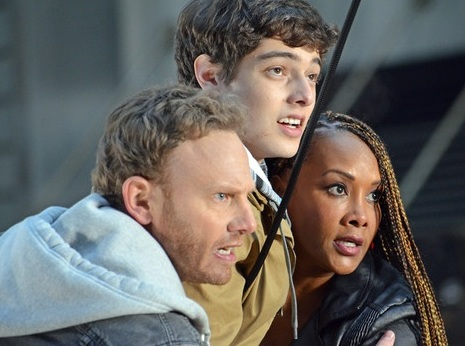
Sharknado 2: The Second One actors Ian Ziering, Dante Palminteri, and Vivica A. Fox

The Asylum is not affiliated with any industry trade unions other than the SAG-AFTRA. This means their employees will sometimes work up to 22 hours a day. Whereas most major studios shoot one page from the script a day, the Asylum shoots around 10 to 12 pages a day. Due to the demanding work schedule, the Asylum often hires filmmakers with several years of experience. Around $150,000 of a film's budget is allocated to hiring lesser known actors that would appeal to specific audiences. For example, Rimawi notes that former Baywatch actors like David Chokachi are popular among European audiences. In an interview with Grantland, Latt stated, "We know not to go after Johnny Depp. But we'll go after Johnny Depp's cousin. That's fair game." Rimawi further added, "I'm guessing that many of our main actors do this because they have bills to pay, and they want to be in and out as inconspicuously as possible. But the repeat guys have made their peace with what they're doing."

Post-production is handled at the Asylum's headquarters in Burbank, California, which includes its own editing bays and visual effects studios. Former editors at this headquarters include Drew Talbert. The visual effects for their films are often poorly rendered, and a constant source of ridicule from critics. Tom Breihan of Grantland jokingly wrote, "From the looks of things, [the Asylum] also goes after the cousins of the Pirates of the Caribbean special-effects team ... At their best, Asylum's in-house effects team can manage something slightly more lifelike than what you'd see on the average Hercules: The Legendary Journeys episode." The Asylum employs 15 visual effects artists, and they are often working on six films at once.

Marketing campaigns often hype up the absurdity of the film's premise and the studio's overall business model. In 2012, Asylum films would open with the text, "15 years. 100 films. You're Welcome". In a similar vein, the tagline for Sharknado was "Enough Said". Latt described the Asylum's marketing strategy as "a parody of the studio system". Whenever the Asylum makes a mockbuster, they tie the release of their film to coincide with the release of the larger film it's based on. Bales argues that this is not an attempt to deceive consumers, but instead gives consumers more options to watch. The Asylum is upfront about some of their duplicitous marketing strategies. In a 2010 blog post, the Asylum urged fans to add the studio's film to their Netflix queues in order to increase the perception of public demand. The blog post said, "This isn't about trying to get you to watch our movie. This is about gaming the system. This is about taking a stand. Against math."

== Reputation and analysis ==
The Asylum has garnered a discordant and at times controversial reputation within the film industry. Nearly all of their films have been panned by critics, and their mockbusters are often belittled as shameless cash grabs. Breihan wrote, "It takes a certain punk-rock panache for a company to unapologetically position itself as a parasite on the movie business." Film producer Brian Grazer compared the Asylum to "pollution in Hollywood, in that you've just got to live with it". Despite their reputation, Bales argues that the Asylum's popularity is multifaceted, and not the result of deceitful marketing tactics. To this extent, some journalists have postulated that consumer interest in Asylum films come from a desire to watch campy films, in particular those that fall under the "so bad it's good" label.

Some journalists have defended the Asylum. Greg Hudson of Sharp believes that the Asylum's cynical business model is merely a microcosm of the American film industry. Hudson wrote, "Sure, the Asylum makes knock-offs, but so does Hollywood. So does fashion. If culture is a constant exchange of ideas, commerce is the booze that lubricates that discussion. Consider the Asylum a drunken digression." Amy Nicholson of Boxoffice said that the Asylum caters to its audience by leaning into the absurdity of their film plots. She used Snakes on a Plane as an example of a large studio film that disappointed viewers with a predictable ending, whereas the Asylum mockbuster Snakes on a Train ends with a giant snake eating the train. According to Nichsolson, "That's what people who see that kind of movie want to see, and studios don't have the guts to do it."

David Roth of Slate argues that the Asylum's mockbusters succeed in satirizing the larger films they are based on. Roth used the Asylum film Sir Arthur Conan Doyle's Sherlock Holmes as an example, as he felt that its usage of dinosaurs and dragons as antagonists was intended to mock the action sequences and animal jokes in the Guy Ritchie film Sherlock Holmes. Roth wrote, "The more puffed-up and self-serious and dumb Hollywood blockbusters become, the more they demand to see their goofiness mirrored by cheap, unpretentious, equally dumb knockoffs."

== Catalog ==
According to the Asylum's website, the studio has released more than 500 films, including 300 original films. Their catalog encompasses virtually every major genre, although the studio primarily focuses on disaster films, horror films, and science fiction films. Rimawi stated, "The only thing we haven't done is straight drama. In other words, good films."

Among their more notable releases include:

- 2-Headed Shark Attack (2012)
- Abraham Lincoln vs. Zombies (2012)
- Age of the Hobbits (2013)
- Alone for Christmas (2013)
- American Battleship (2012)
- Atlantic Rim (2013)
- Black Summer (television series, 2019–2021)
- The Da Vinci Treasure (2006)
- The Day the Earth Stopped (2008)
- H. G. Wells' War of the Worlds (2005)
- Hold Your Breath (2012)
- King of the Lost World (2005)
- Mega Shark Versus Giant Octopus (2009)
- Nazis at the Center of the Earth (2012)
- Sharknado (2013)
- Snakes on a Train (2006)
- Titanic II (2010)
- Transmorphers (2007)
- Z Nation (television series, 2014–2018)

In 2025, Australian director Anthony Frith was engaged to make The Land That Time Forgot. Alongside making the film, Frith made a feature documentary, titled Mockbuster, about his experience of making the film. The film includes scenes with the Asylum executives as well as actors and other crew.
