= Night of the Living Dead (disambiguation) =

Night of the Living Dead may refer to:

== Film ==
- Night of the Living Dead (film series), a series of 6 horror films directed by George A. Romero
  - Night of the Living Dead (1968), the first film in the series, and subsequent revisions Night of the Living Dead: 30th Anniversary Edition (1999) and Night of the Living Dead: Reanimated (2010)
    - Night of the Living Dead (1990 film), a remake of the 1968 film directed by Tom Savini
    - Night of the Living Dead 3D (2006), a second remake directed by Jeff Broadstreet
      - Night of the Living Dead 3D: Re-Animation, a 2012 prequel
    - Mimesis: Night of the Living Dead (2011), the film that is not meant as a remake; instead, to address themes of obsessed fans
    - Night of the Living Dead: Resurrection (2012), a third remake directed by James Plumb
    - Night of the Living Dead: Darkest Dawn (2015), an animated re-telling of the 1968 film
    - Night of the Animated Dead (2021), an animated remake directed by Jason Axinn
    - Night of the Living Dead II (2023), a sequel of the 1968 film directed by Marcus Slabine

== Music ==
- "Night of the Living Dead" (song), by Misfits, 1979

== See also ==
- Night of the Living (disambiguation)
- "Knight of the Living Dead", a 2008 single by Stone Gods
- "Night of the Dead Living", an episode of Homicide: Life on the Street
