= Cyclone (1987 film) =

1987 film by Fred Olen Ray

- Promotional film poster
- Directed by: Fred Olen Ray
- Written by: Paul Garson; T.L. Lankford; Fred Olen Ray (uncredited)
- Produced by: Paul Hertzberg
- Starring: Heather Thomas; Jeffrey Combs; Dar Robinson; Martine Beswick; Martin Landau; Huntz Hall; Troy Donahue
- Cinematography: Paul Elliott
- Edited by: Robert A. Ferretti
- Music by: David A. Jackson; Haunted Garage (songs)
- Distributed by: CineTel Films
- Release date: March 20, 1987
- Running time: 83 min.
- Country: United States
- Language: English
- Budget: $750,000
- Box office: $41,174 (USA)

Cyclone is a 1987 science fiction action film directed by Fred Olen Ray, starring Heather Thomas, Jeffrey Combs, Martine Beswick, Huntz Hall and Martin Landau. It concerns a woman who must keep the ultimate motorcycle from falling into the wrong hands.

== Plot ==
Teri leaves the gym and stops by a motorcycle repair shop to pick up parts for her inventor boyfriend Rick. Rick has developed the ultimate motorcycle, the Cyclone. It is a $5 million bike equipped with rocket launchers and laser guns, which only needs oxygen to operate. The funding for the cutting edge motor cycle was provided by the government who wish to take control of the vehicle. In addition, local criminal arms dealers see the motorcycle as a bonanza and are attempting to steal it to sell on the black market.

When Teri and Rick head out to a local hotspot, Rick is murdered by those who wish to gain control of the prototype. It is now up to Teri to keep the Cyclone from falling into the wrong hands. Teri was told in a video Rick filmed before being stabbed that she can trust Agent Bob Jenkins, but she discovers that Jenkins has also been killed. With no one left that she can trust but herself, she must decide how to be sure the motorcycle is not misused in the future.

== Cast ==
- Heather Thomas as Teri Marshall
- Jeffrey Combs as Rick Davenport
- Dar Robinson as Rolf
- Martine Beswick as Waters
- Martin Landau as Basarian
- Huntz Hall as John "Long John"
- Troy Donahue as Bob Jenkins
- Robert Quarry as Knowles

== Production ==
=== Development and writing ===
The film was developed from an outline by director Fred Olen Ray under the working title of Cycle Warrior. Paul Garson, a contributor to several motorsports magazines including Hot Bike, was approached to write the screenplay by Ray, who knew him from his press work. He was offered a meager $3500, and given a week to deliver his first draft. Garson, who aspired to write fiction, accepted the challenge and locked himself inside a hotel room to meet the deadline. The titular "Cyclone" prototype was based on a Honda XL350. Its futuristic body was made by Tracy Nelson's Tracy Design of Santa Barbara, California.

=== Casting ===
Ray originally had Linda Blair in mind for the starring role, but she yearned for an image change and more comedic roles. CineTel was then offered the services of Heather Thomas, who was paid just $20,000 for her appearance. She had a clause inserted in her contract that guaranteed she would not do any nudity. Celebrity sons Michael Reagan and Tim Conway Jr. also made their feature debut as a pair of detectives.

As usual, vintage movie enthusiast Ray peppered the supporting cast with classic actors. He had known Martin Landau for about two years, but it was the first time he had backers who were willing to pay his rate. However, CineTel were adamantly against the hiring of Huntz Hall, whom Ray had loved as part of the Bowery Boys. They only signed on him after running out of more recognizable candidates, and still refused to give a him a credit on the poster, which offended the actor. Some press items, perhaps based on early promotional material, mentioned Patrick McGoohan, Robert Vaughn and Russ Tamblyn as part of the cast, although they do not appear in the final version.

=== Filming ===
The Los Angeles Times announced the start of principal photography for the fourth week of August 1986. However, another source wrote that Thomas started filming on August 11, 1986. The film was shot in the Los Angeles area over an 18-day schedule for a budget of $750,000. The scene where Thomas gets tortured had to be moved to a backstage area not intended for filming, after the real soundstage became unavailable. This explains the distracting background noises heard throughout. Due to his family connections, Reagan's participation entailed the presence of the Secret Service while he was on set.

Ray did not have the best experience with his cast. Star Heather Thomas was difficult, at one point threatening to no-show the next day unless she was given a pair of Fred Segal Tark'1 jeans to wear. She also showed some animosity towards her co-star Ashley Ferrare. Some of the veteran actors did not show the expected preparedness. Robert Quarry and Martine Beswick did not cope well with the long days and sometimes struggled with their lines. However, he maintained a good rapport with Landau, and struck a friendship with Jeffrey Combs after discovering that the latter was his neighbor and a friend of his son, which led to further collaborations.

=== Dedication ===
Actor and stuntman Dar Robinson died in November 1986 on the set of Million Dollar Mystery. That movie, Cyclone, and Lethal Weapon were all dedicated to his memory.

== Release ==
=== Pre-release ===
During an appearance on the NBC talk show Late Night with David Letterman shortly before Cyclone's opening, Heather Thomas denounced the film, saying she had done it to pay for her divorce bills, and that it was "coming to an airplane near you". Her abrasive comments, which strayed from promotional conventions, drew a surprised reaction from the host and audience alike.

=== Theatrical ===
CineTel gave Cyclone a touring regional release. Some press materials indicate that the film was supposed to debut on January 10, 1987. However, no showtimes could be found for it around that date. The film seems to have made its actual debut on March 20, 1987, at various Florida locations.

=== Home video ===
The film arrived on VHS and Betamax tape through RCA Columbia Pictures Home Video on June 25, 1987. It made its domestic DVD debut from budget publisher Platinum Disc on January 7, 2003. Cyclone was slated to come to Blu-ray through Code Red on November 31, 2021, but the release was cancelled after it turned out that MGM, who had licensed the film's rights to the publisher, did not own them anymore.

== Reception ==
Cyclone received mixed-to-negative reviews. Bob Ross of the Tampa Tribune lambasted the film as a "laughably inept chase-adventure [...] that lacks even rudimentary traces of professionalism." Kevin Tomas of the Los Angeles Times found that "Thomas is a spunky, believable action heroine, and she has a strong assist from Martine Beswicke [sic]" but "[a]ction movies don’t come dumber than Cyclone. Tony Frazier of The Daily Oklahoman was marginally more forgiving, writing: "To say Cyclone is a bad movie would be an overstatement. To say it's incomplete would be an understatement. I guess you could call it anorexic."

John Stanley, author of the Creature Features series of books, gave the movie two out of five stars and stated that it contained "one blazing firefight and vehicle chase after another with no plot twists to brag about or motivated characters." Sister publications TV Guide and the Motion Picture Annual gave the movie two out of five stars, writing that "Thomas is a likable enough heroine, though the script makes no real demands of her. The real source of interest is the cast of B-movie veterans whom director Fred Olen Ray habitually assembles for his films." In an article focusing on B-movies, Doug Brod of Video Review gave the film three and a half Bs (a replacement for their usual stars) out of four, and wrote that "[l]ots of action and a terrific supporting cast make this one whirl."
