= Night of the Living Dead remakes =

Versions of the 1968 horror film

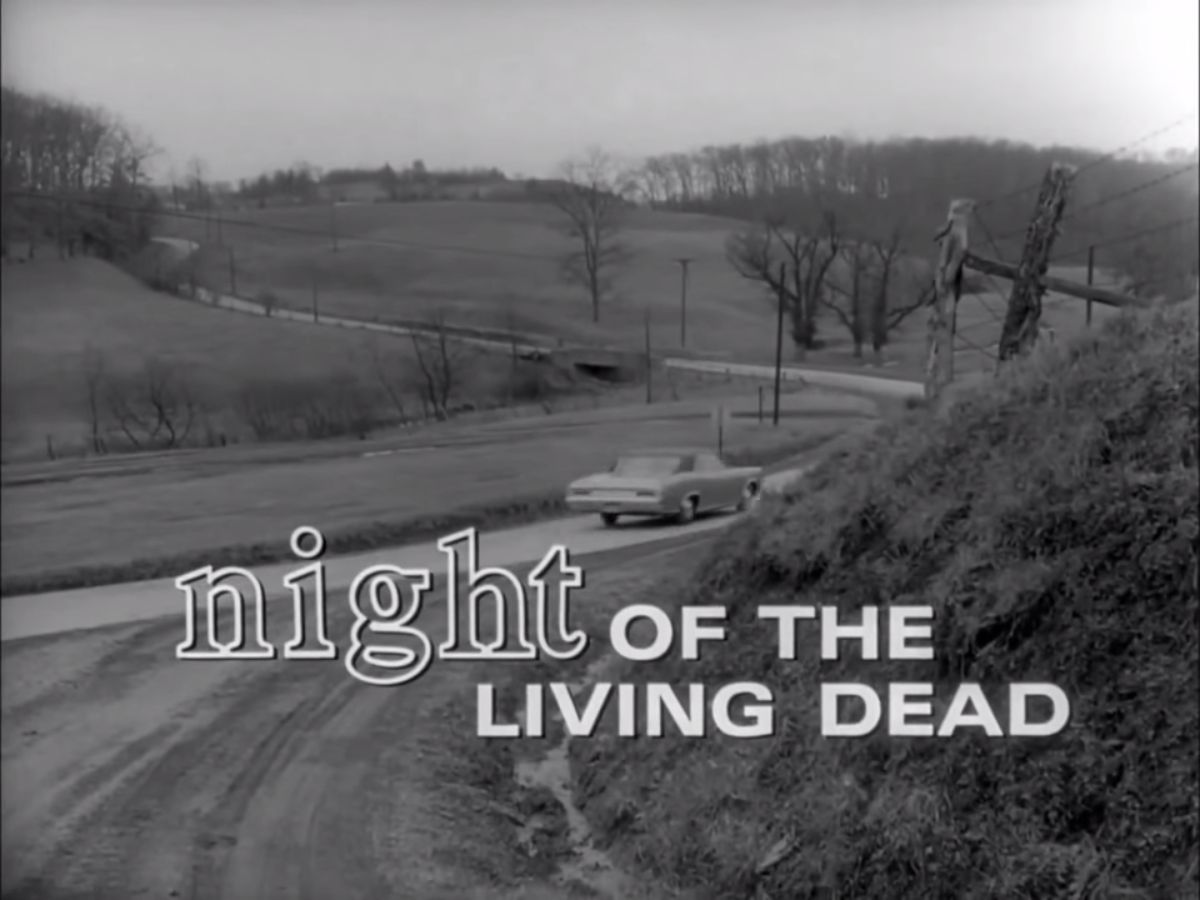
Night of the Living Dead (1968) title card

Numerous remakes of Night of the Living Dead have adapted and reimagined the seminal 1968 horror film. It has been remade more than any other movie. The distributor mistakenly released it without copyright protection, putting it directly into the public domain. When changing the title from Night of the Flesh Eaters, The Walter Reade Organization also removed the only copyright notice in the film. This absence of copyright protection allowed filmmakers to adapt the original work without permission from the film's production company. A protracted court case found that the creators, Image Ten, did not hold the copyright, and the film's creators received little of its millions in revenue. Bill Hinzman, who played the cemetery zombie in the original film, directed Flesheater in 1988. Flesheater has similarities but is considered an homage rather than a direct remake. The first official remake in 1990 roughly followed the original film's script and involved members of the original crew. They were partly motivated by the missed revenue from the original film. The 1990 version was atypical for a Hollywood remake in having the support of the original film's director, George A. Romero, and other creators. Rumors of another studio planning to remake the public domain film without his involvement spurred Romero into action. In the following years, there were many unofficial remakes. The film has seen an official color remake, an unofficial 3D version, and many independent remakes.

== Night of the Living Dead (1990) ==
Night of the Living Dead, also known as George A. Romero's Night of the Living Dead, is the official 1990 remake directed by Tom Savini (in his feature directorial debut) and starring Tony Todd and Patricia Tallman. Savini had planned to work on the 1968 film before being drafted into the Vietnam War. After the war, Savini worked with Romero on the sequels. The 1990 remake was filmed in color with a much larger budget. The film grossed $5.8 million against a $4.2 million budget. Columbia Pictures released Night of the Living Dead in the United States on October 19, 1990.

Like the original, the film follows seven strangers as they meet and survive in a rural farmhouse following the awakening of cannibalistic zombies. It received negative reviews upon initial release, but modern reviews have been more positive. The remake was based on the original screenplay but included a revised plot that portrayed Barbra (Patricia Tallman) as a capable and active heroine. Barbara's narrative arc in the remake subverts the final girl trope in horror films. Film historian Barry Grant interprets the new Barbara as a reversal of the original film's portrayal of feminine passivity.

== List of independent remakes ==
Due to its public domain status, many producers have created remakes of Night of the Living Dead. In the United States, the film was mistakenly released into the public domain because the original distributor failed to replace the copyright notice when changing the film's name. Several years after the film's release, its creators discovered that the original prints distributed to theaters had no copyright protection. The themes of the original film have had broad appeal, and its titular "living dead" have been used as an allegory for racial tension, terrorism, nuclear war, and beyond.

- Night of the Living Dead 3D (2006): The second remake, after Savini and Romero's official adaptation, was released in September 2006. Directed by Jeff Broadstreet and starring Sid Haig, the project was not affiliated with Romero. Broadstreet's film was followed in 2012 by a prequel, Night of the Living Dead 3D: Re-Animation.
- Night of the Living Dead: Darkest Dawn (2015): On September 15, 2009, it was announced that Simon West was producing a 3D animated retelling of the original film, originally titled Night of the Living Dead: Origins 3D. The movie is written and directed by Zebediah de Soto. The voice cast includes Tony Todd as Ben, Danielle Harris as Barbra, Joseph Pilato as Harry Cooper, Alona Tal as Helen Cooper, Bill Moseley as Johnny, Tom Sizemore as Chief McClellan and newcomers Erin Braswell as Judy and Michael Diskint as Tom. After years in production, it was released in 2015.
- Mimesis: Night of the Living Dead (2011): Director Doug Schulze's 2011 film relates the story of a group of horror film fans who become involved in a "real-life" version of the 1968 film.
- Night of the Living Dead: Resurrection (2012): British filmmaker James Plumb directed this Wales-set remake.
- A Night of the Living Dead (2014): Shattered Images Films and Cullen Park Productions released a remake with new twists and characters, written and directed by Chad Zuver.
- Rebirth (formerly Night of the Living Dead: Rebirth) (2021): Rising Pulse Productions' updated take on the classic film was released in June 2021 and brings to light present issues that impact modern society such as religious bigotry, homophobia and the influence of social media.
- Night of the Animated Dead (2021): Warner Bros. Home Entertainment announced in June 2021 that they were in production of an animated adaptation. Directed by Jason Axinn (To Your Last Death) and featuring the voices of Dulé Hill (Ben), Katharine Isabelle (Barbra), Josh Duhamel (Harry Cooper), James Roday Rodriguez (Tom), Katee Sackhoff (Judy), Will Sasso (Sheriff McClelland), Jimmi Simpson (Johnny) and Nancy Travis (Helen Cooper), it was released via video on demand on September 21, 2021.
- Night of the Living Dead II: In June 2021, director Marcus Slabine debuted his secretly filmed sequel idea trailer. The film was to star Lori Cardille, Terry Alexander and Jarlath Conroy of Day of the Dead. However, as of 2026, the project has not been filmed and appears abandoned.
- A Night of the Undead (2022) was released to select theaters in October 2022. In January 2023, the film saw wider release. Directed by Kenny Scott Guffey, Jake C. Young and stars Denny Kidd, Briana Phipps-Stotts, and Mason Johnson.
- Festival of the Living Dead (2024): In May 2023, the Soska sisters announced an in-universe followup taking place half a century after the events of the 1968 film, starring Ashley Moore and Camren Bicondova. It was released on Tubi on April 5, 2024.
- Night of the Rising Dead (formerly Night of the Living Dead) (2026): A modern day set remake from ITN Distribution starring Vivica A. Fox, Brittany Underwood, Robert Carradine, and Rob Van Dam and directed by Christopher Ray was announced in April 2026. After initially being released with the title Night of the Living Dead, it was subsequently re-titled Night of the Rising Dead.
