= Georgina Garcia Riedel =

American filmmaker and scriptwriter

Georgina Garcia Riedel is an American filmmaker and scriptwriter.

== Biography ==
Riedel was born and raised in Arizona, a first generation American with Mexican parents.

She attended the American Film Institute from where she graduated with an MFA in directing.

Riedel made her first feature film, How the Garcia Girls Spent Their Summer starring America Ferrera, in 2005. The film was financed entirely by her parents and took over a year to edit as Riedel could not raise additional funds to finish it. The film was premiered In Competition at the 2005 Sundance Film Festival but was not released until 2008. In 2015, Riedel released her second feature film, Ana Maria in Novela Land starring Edy Ganem. She directed the "Chapter Thirty-Eight" episode of Jane the Virgin.

== Filmography ==
- How the Garcia Girls Spent Their Summer (2005)
- Ana Maria in Novela Land (2015)
