= Jeffrey Combs =

American actor (born 1954)

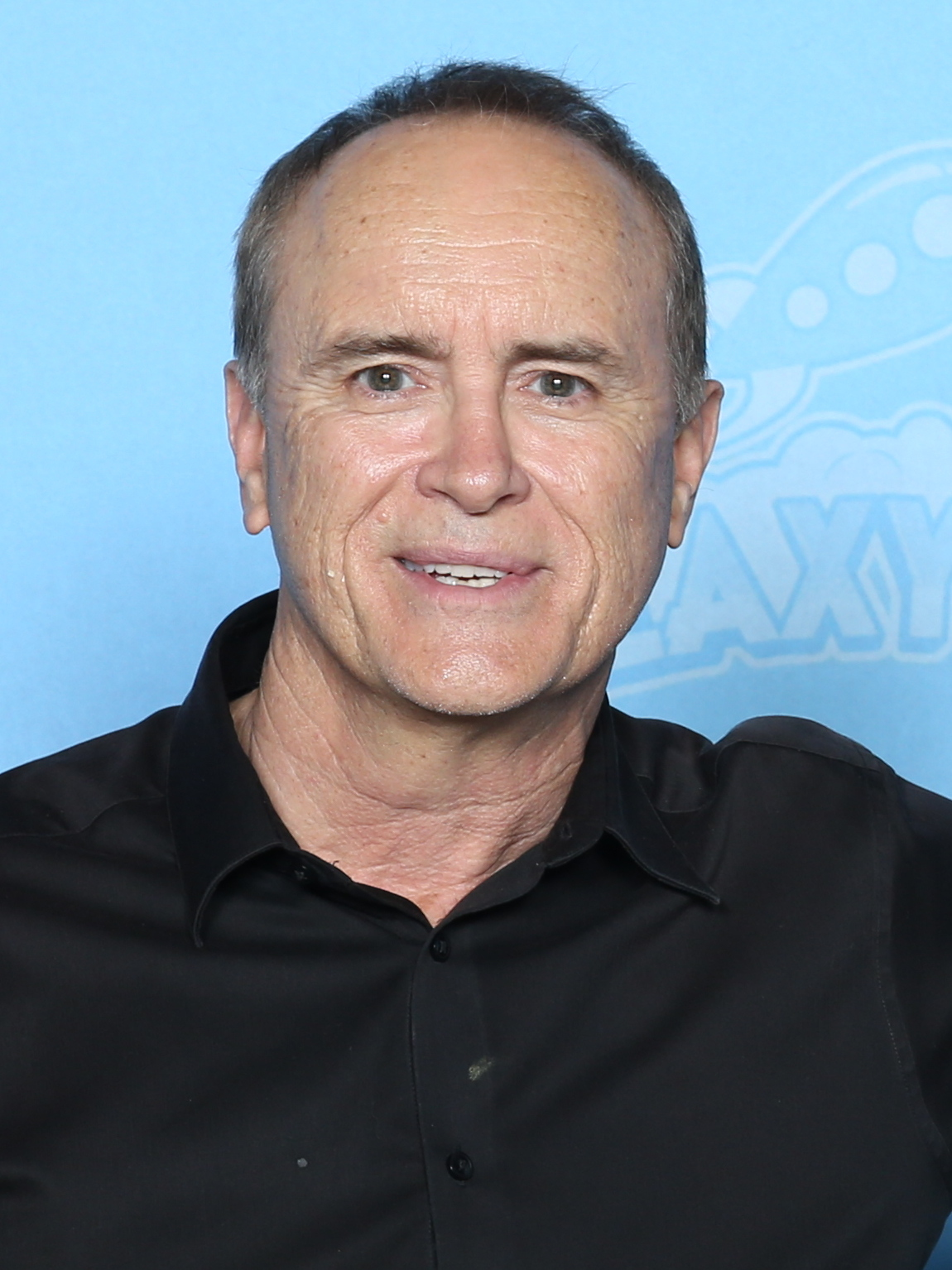
- Combs at GalaxyCon Richmond in 2022
- Born: September 9, 1954 (age 72); Oxnard, California, U.S.
- Education: Allan Hancock College (attended); University of Washington (BFA)
- Occupation: Actor
- Years active: 1971–present
- Spouse: Alice Cadogan

Jeffrey Alan Combs (born September 9, 1954) is an American actor. He is best known for starring as Herbert West in the H.P. Lovecraft adaptation Re-Animator (1985) and portraying a number of characters in the Star Trek universe, most notably Brunt and the various Weyouns on Star Trek: Deep Space Nine (1994–1999), and Shran on Star Trek: Enterprise (2001–2005).

Combs has been a prominent figure within the horror genre through most of his career, acting in eight films directed by Re-Animator director Stuart Gordon such as From Beyond (1986), The Pit and the Pendulum (1991), and Castle Freak (1995). Other horror film appearances include Necronomicon (1993), Peter Jackson's The Frighteners (1996), I Still Know What You Did Last Summer (1998), House on Haunted Hill (1999), and Would You Rather (2012). As a voice actor, Combs is best known as the voice of the Scarecrow on The New Batman Adventures (1997-1999), the Question on Justice League Unlimited (2004–2006) and Ratchet on Transformers: Prime (2010–2013).

== Early life ==
Combs was born in Oxnard, California, the fifth of nine children born to Jean Owens (formerly Sullins; 1921–1986) and Eugene "Gene" Combs (1922–1999), and raised in Lompoc. Both of his parents were from the Ozarks region of Arkansas. A graduate of Lompoc High School, as a senior, Combs played the lead role of Captain Fisby in a stage production of The Teahouse of the August Moon. Combs then attended Santa Maria's Pacific Conservatory of the Performing Arts at Allan Hancock College, and later developed his acting skills in the Professional Actor's Training Program at the University of Washington from which he graduated in the late 1970s.

In 1980, after several years performing in playhouses on the West Coast, Combs moved to Los Angeles. He landed his first role in the film Honky Tonk Freeway (1981), playing an unnamed drive-in teller. His first horror film role came two years later in Frightmare (1983).

== Career ==
Combs's best-known horror role is Herbert West, the main character in the film Re-Animator (1985), and its two sequels. He portrayed author H. P. Lovecraft (creator of the Herbert West character) in the film Necronomicon: Book of the Dead (1993) and has starred in eight adaptations of Lovecraft's works. Other film credits include The Attic Expeditions (2001), FeardotCom (2002), House on Haunted Hill (1999), I Still Know What You Did Last Summer (1998) and The Frighteners (1996).

Combs has had roles in many science fiction television series. He starred as the telepath Harriman Gray in first-season episode "Eyes" (1994) of Babylon 5. In 2001, he played the sinister Dr. Ek in The Attic Expeditions. In August 2005, he appeared for the first time on the science fiction series The 4400 as Dr. Kevin Burkhoff which became a recurring role by 2006. In early 2007, he played a highly fictionalized Edgar Allan Poe in "The Black Cat" episode of Masters of Horror. In the 2012 miniseries Dorothy and the Witches of Oz (sometimes called The Witches of Oz), he had a small role as a fictionalized version of L. Frank Baum.

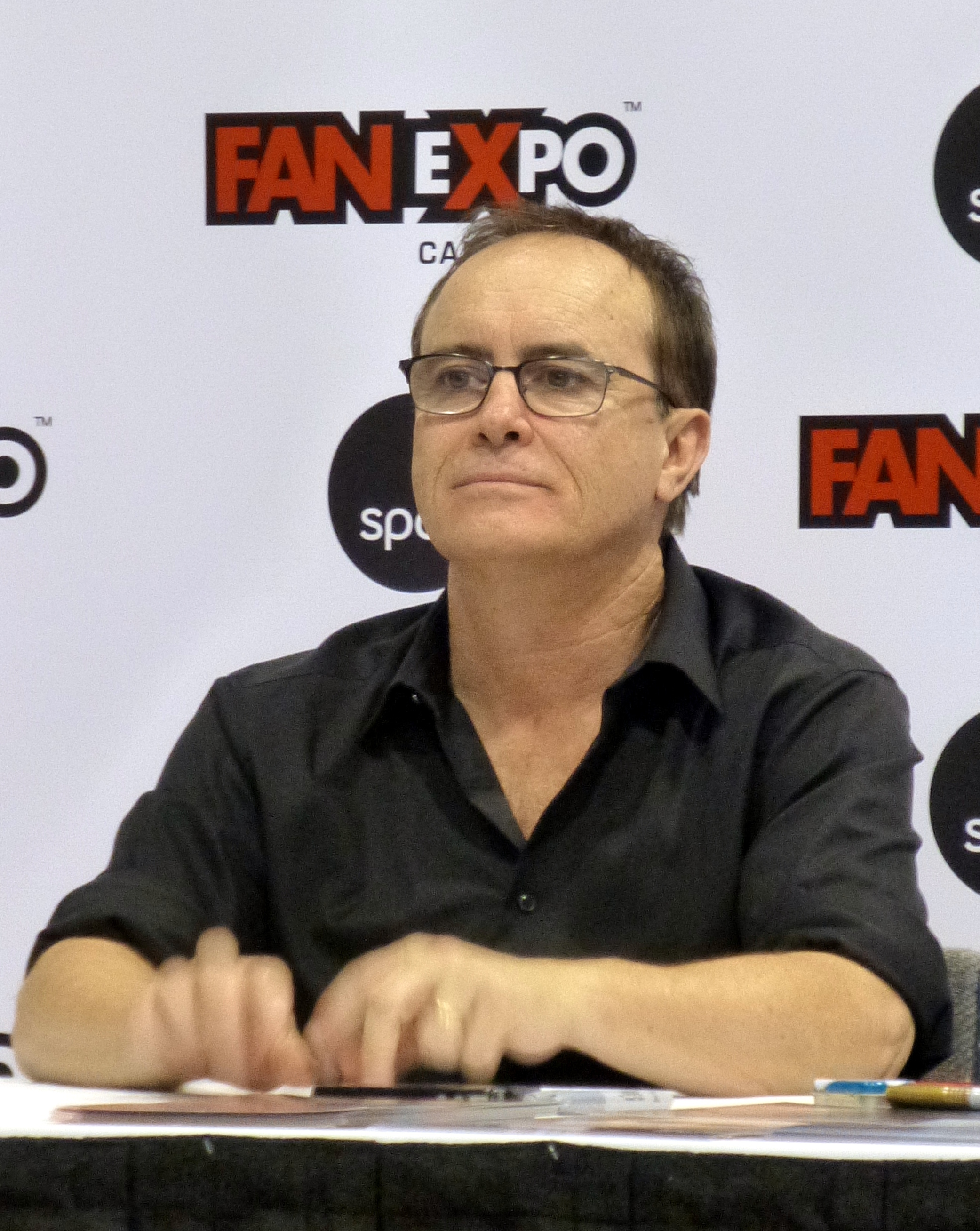
Combs in 2015

Combs has also worked as a voiceover artist. His voiceover roles include the Scarecrow in The New Batman Adventures, the Question in Justice League Unlimited, Ratchet in Transformers: Prime, the Leader in The Avengers: Earth's Mightiest Heroes, the Rat King in Teenage Mutant Ninja Turtles, and Brainiac in Injustice 2. He also narrated the 25th anniversary of Re-Animator at the 2010 FanTasia.

In July 2009, Combs returned to his stage roots and reprised his role as Edgar Allan Poe in a one-man theatrical show, Nevermore...an Evening with Edgar Allan Poe, at The Steve Allen Theater in Hollywood, California. Although it was supposed to run for only a month, it enjoyed much success and sold-out crowds, and was extended four times, until closing in Los Angeles on December 19, 2009. The show had its East Coast debut on January 23 and 24, 2010 at Westminster Hall in Baltimore, Maryland, Poe's final resting place. A tour of the Saturn Award-nominated Nevermore was subsequently planned.

Combs starred with Andrew Divoff in the 2012 Screen Media Films release Night of the Living Dead 3D: Re-Animation, a prequel to the 2006 film Night of the Living Dead 3D directed by Jeff Broadstreet. In 2012, he also played the sadistic Dr. Lambrick in another horror-thriller, Would You Rather.

=== Star Trek ===
On television, Combs enjoyed popular success playing a number of alien characters on the various modern Star Trek incarnations, beginning with Star Trek: Deep Space Nine in 1994, and continuing to Star Trek: Voyager in 2000, Star Trek: Enterprise in 2001 and Star Trek: Lower Decks in 2021. He has played nine onscreen roles in the Star Trek universe. His largest science-fiction role to date was his regular guest role on Deep Space Nine as the Vorta clone Weyoun. Combs has said that Weyoun was his favorite Star Trek role, and that he had considerable input in developing the character.

On the same series, Combs had a recurring role as the Ferengi character Brunt. During the DS9 episode "The Dogs of War", he appeared as both Weyoun and Brunt, becoming one of the few Star Trek actors to play two characters in the same episode (others including Patrick Stewart, Brent Spiner, and Brian Markinson). Combs wanted the characters to appear in the same scene, but the logistics and expense worked against it.

On Enterprise, Combs had a recurring role as Shran, an Andorian military officer. Enterprise producer Manny Coto once said in an interview that he had hoped to make Combs a regular on Enterprise had the series been renewed for a fifth season.

In addition to his recurring Star Trek roles, Combs had non-recurring roles as human police officer Kevin Mulkahey, alien Tiron on Deep Space Nine, alien Penk on Voyager, and Ferengi pirate Krem on Enterprise. Along with many other actors, writers and creators of the show, Combs also had a cameo appearance as a holographic patron in Vic's Lounge in the final episode of Deep Space Nine. He also voices the character of Romulan Commander Suldok for the Star Trek: Elite Force II video game. In 2021, he had a guest voice role as AGIMUS, an evil computer, in episode 7, season 2 of Star Trek: Lower Decks, which he reprised in seasons 3 and 4.

== Filmography ==
=== Film ===
Year	Film	Role	Notes	Ref.
1981	Honky Tonk Freeway	Drive-In Teller		
1981	Whose Life Is It Anyway?	1st Year Intern		
1981	Frightmare	Stu		
1983	The Skin of Our Teeth	Henry Antrobus		
1983	The Man with Two Brains	Dr. Jones		
1985	Re-Animator	Herbert West		
1986	From Beyond	Dr. Crawford Tillinghast		
1987	Cyclone	Rick Davenport		
1987	Dead Man Walking	Chaz		
1988	Cellar Dweller	Colin Childress		
1988	The Phantom Empire	Andrew Paris	Direct-to-video	
1988	Pulse Pounders	Johnathan		
1989	Robot Jox	Spectator, Prole		
1990	Bride of Re-Animator	Herbert West		
1991	The Guyver	Dr. East		
1991	The Pit and the Pendulum	Francisco, The Inquisitor		
1991	Trancers II	Dr. Pyle	Direct-to-video	
1992	Doctor Mordrid	Dr. Mordrid		
1992	Fortress	"D-Day"		
1993	Necronomicon	H. P. Lovecraft		
1994	Love and a .45	Bob "Dinosaur Bob"		
1994	Lurking Fear	Dr. Haggis		
1995	Castle Freak	John Reilly	Direct-to-video	
1995	Dillinger and Capone	Gilroy	Direct-to-video	
1995	Cyberstalker	Andy Coberman	Also known as The Digital Prophet	
1995	Felony	Bill Knight		
1995	Time Tracers	Dr. Carrington	Also known as Time Chasers	
1996	Death Falls	Lonnie Hawks		
1996	The Frighteners	Special Agent Milton Dammers		
1996	Norma Jean & Marilyn	Montgomery Clift		
1997	Snide and Prejudice	Therapist Meissner		
1998	I Still Know What You Did Last Summer	Mr. Brooks		
1998	Caught Up	Security Guard		
1998	Spoiler	Captain		
1999	House on Haunted Hill	Dr. Richard Benjamin Vannacutt		
1999	Poseidon's Fury: Escape from the Lost City	Lord Darkennon		
2000	Faust: Love of the Damned	Lieutenant Dan Margolies		
2001	The Attic Expeditions	Dr. Ek		
2001	Contagion	Brown	Also known as Epidemic and The Last Breath	
2002	FeardotCom	Detective Sykes		
2003	Beyond Re-Animator	Herbert West		
2004	Tomb of Terror	Dr. Haggis	Archive footage	
2005	All Souls Day: Dia de los Muertos	Thomas White		
2005	Edmond	Desk Clerk		
2006	Satanic	Detective Joyner		
2006	Abominable	Buddy, The Clerk		
2006	Blackwater Valley Exorcism	Sheriff Jimmy		
2007	The Attackmen	Mr. Simms	Short film	
2007	Return to House on Haunted Hill	Dr. Richard Benjamin Vannacutt		
2007	The Wizard of Gore	The Geek		
2007	Stuck	911 Operator	Voice	
2007	Brutal	Sheriff Jimmy Fleck		
2008	Parasomnia	Detective Garrett		
2008	The Dunwich Horror	Wilbur	Direct-to-video	
2009	Dark House	Walston Rey	2010	"American Bandits: Frank and Jesse James"
2012	Elf-Man	Mickey	Direct-to-video	
2012	Would You Rather	Shepard Lambrick		
2012	Night of the Living Dead 3D: Re-Animation	Harold Tovar		
2014	Suburban Gothic	Dr. Carpenter		
2014	Beethoven's Treasure Tail	Fritz Bruchschnauser / Howard Belch	Direct-to-video	
2016	Unbelievable!!!!!	Male Larrisha		
2017	Howard Lovecraft and the Undersea Kingdom	King Abdul	Voices; Direct-to-video	
2018	Scooby-Doo! & Batman: The Brave and the Bold	The Question, Professor Scarlett	Voices; Direct-to-video	
2018	Howard Lovecraft and the Kingdom of Madness	H. P. Lovecraft	Voices; Direct-to-video	
2019	In Search of Darkness	Himself	Documentary	
2020	In Search of Darkness: Part II	Himself	Documentary	
2023	Batman: The Doom That Came to Gotham	Kirk Langstrom	Voice; Direct-to-video	
2023	Onyx the Fortuitous and the Talisman of Souls	Bartok the Great		
2024	Stream	Mr. Lockwood		
2024	Watchmen Chapter 1	Edgar Jacobi / Moloch the Mystic, British Newscaster, Photographer #1	Voices; Direct-to-video	
2025	Lilly Lives Alone	Russel		

=== Television ===
Year	Title	Role	Notes	Ref.
1983	The Mississippi	Military Cadet	Episode: "We Remember, We Revere"	
1987	Beauty and the Beast	Python	Episode: "No Way Down"	
1987	Houston Knights	Frank Stark	Episode: "Lady Smoke"	
1988	Jake and the Fatman	Alan Shuba	Episode: "What is This Thing Called Love"	
1989	Freddy's Nightmares	Ralph	Episode: "Love Stinks"	
1989	Life Goes On	Burk Clifton	Episode: "Invasion of the Thatcher Snatchers"	
1989	Hunter	James Wilkins	Episode: "Fatal Obsession, Part 2"	
1991	The Flash	Jimmy Swain	Episode: "Captain Cold"	
1991	Sisters	Derek Cotts	Episode: "Protective Measures"	
1994	Babylon 5	Harriman Gray	Episode: "Eyes"	
1994–99	Star Trek: Deep Space Nine	Brunt, Weyoun, Tiron	33 episodes	
1995	The Single Guy	Klein	Episode: "The Virgin"	
1995	Ultraman: The Ultimate Hero	Roger "Sheck" Shector	Episode: "A Quartet Of Creatures"	
1996	Perversions of Science	Prisoner #50557	Episode: "The Exile"	
1997	The New Batman Adventures	Dr. Jonathan Crane / Scarecrow	Voice; Episode: "Never Fear"	
1998	The Net	Max Copernicus	Episode: "Lunatic Fringe"	
1998	Alien Voices: A Halloween Trilogy	Himself	TV special	
2000	Star Trek: Voyager	Penk	Episode: "Tsunkatse"	
2000	Martial Law	Antoine Trembel	Episode: "In the Dark"	
2001	FreakyLinks	Coroner	Episode: "Subject: Live Fast, Die Young"	
2001–05	Star Trek: Enterprise	Shran, Krem	11 episodes	
2002	The Twilight Zone	Harry Radditch	Episode: "The Placebo Effect"	
2002	She Spies	Indigo	Episode: "The Replacement"	
2003	Spider-Man: The New Animated Series	Dr. Zellner, Professor	Voices; 2 episodes	
2003	CSI: Crime Scene Investigation	Dr. Dale Sterling	Episode: "Jackpot"	
2004–06	Justice League Unlimited	Vic Sage / Question, Dr. Moon, Assistant	Voices; 5 episodes	
2004–06	Super Robot Monkey Team Hyperforce Go!	Gyrus Krinkle	Voice; 2 episodes	
2005	Hammerhead: Shark Frenzy	Dr. Preston King	Television film	
2005–07	The 4400	Kevin Burkhoff	15 episodes	
2006	Voodoo Moon	Frank Taggert	Television film	
2006	Masters of Horror	Edgar Allan Poe	Episode: "The Black Cat"	
2008	Cold Case	Sly Borden	Episode: "Spiders"	
2009	Batman: The Brave and the Bold	Kite Man	Voice; Episode: "Long Arm of the Law!"	
2010–11	Scooby-Doo! Mystery Incorporated	Professor Hatecraft	Voice, 2 episodes	
2010–12	The Avengers: Earth's Mightiest Heroes	Samuel Sterns / Leader	Voice; 5 episodes	
2010–13	Transformers: Prime	Ratchet, MECH #1	Voice; 56 episodes	
2012	Thundercats	Soul Sever	Voice; Episode: "The Soul Sever"	
2012	Femme Fatales	Interrogator	Voice; Episode: "Killer Instinct"	
2012–16	Teenage Mutant Ninja Turtles	Dr. Victor Falco / Rat King	Voice; 4 episodes	
2013	Transformers Prime Beast Hunters: Predacons Rising	Ratchet	Voice; Television film	
2013	DC Nation – Doom Patrol	Chief	Voice; 3 episodes	
2014	Criminal Minds	John Nichols	Episode: "The Black Queen"	
2014	Ben 10: Omniverse	Kuphulu	Voice; 2 episodes	
2015	Gotham	Office Manager	2 episodes	
2015	Hulk and the Agents of S.M.A.S.H.	Mainframe, Referee Bot	Voices; Episode: "Wheels of Fury"	
2016	Transformers: Robots in Disguise	Ratchet	Voice; 4 episodes	
2017	Stan Against Evil	Impish Man	Episode: "Girls' Night"	
2018–20	Tigtone	Prince Lavender, The Greater Good	Voices; 6 episodes	
2019	Pandora	Berman Livingston	Episode: "Hurricane"	
2019	Hot Streets	Stinkeroni, Captain Moldmug, Elder Vossler	Voices; 2 episodes	
2019	Creepshow	Reinhard	Episode: "Bad Wolf Down/The Finger"	
2021–23	Star Trek: Lower Decks	AGIMUS	Voice; 3 episodes	
2022	Dota: Dragon's Blood	Father	Voice; 3 episodes	
2023–24	SpongeBob SquarePants	Wally	Voice; 2 episodes	
2023	Ollie & Scoops	Edgar Grimson	Voice; Episode: "A Night at Claudia's"	
2024	Masters of the Universe: Revolution	Zodac	Voice; Episode: "The Scepter and the Sword"	
2024	Hysteria!	Mr. McCarthy	Episode: "Mother"	

=== Video games ===
Year	Title	Role	Ref.
2001	Star Trek: Deep Space Nine: Dominion Wars	Weyoun	
2003	Star Trek: Elite Force II	Cmdr. Suldok	
2003	Batman: Rise of Sin Tzu	Dr. Jonathan Crane / Scarecrow	
2012	The Secret World	Hayden Montag, Charles Zurn	
2012	Transformers: Prime – The Game	Ratchet	
2013	Imperium Galactic War	Novus Ordo, Narrator	
2013	Lego Marvel Super Heroes	The Leader	
2017	Injustice 2	Brainiac	
2018	Star Trek Online: Victory Is Life	Weyoun	
2018	Lego DC Super-Villains	Scarecrow, Kite Man, Man	
2025	Dune: Awakening	Zayn De Witte	
2025	Marvel's Deadpool VR	Major Domo	

== Bibliography ==
- Voisin, Scott, Character Kings: Hollywood's Familiar Faces Discuss the Art & Business of Acting BearManor Media, 2009. ISBN 978-1-59393-342-5.
