= Jason Brandt =

American film composer (born 1973)

- Born: Sioux Falls, South Dakota, U.S.
- Education: University of Southern California
- Occupation: Composer
- Years active: 2001–present
- Spouse: Lizelle Brandt
- Children: 2

Jason Brandt (born 1973) is an American composer. Jason composed music for the films Camp Hideout (Christopher Lloyd, Corbin Bleu), Christmas Wonderland (Emily Osment) and F.R.E.D.I. (Kelly Hu, Harvey Guillén). Brandt won Best Original Score at the Burbank International Film Festival for his work on F.R.E.D.I.

Other films include the Lifetime thrillers Mommy Be Mine and The Other Mother (Annie Wersching), A Christmas Reunion (Denise Richards, Patrick Muldoon), Night of the Living Dead 3D (Sid Haig) and the documentary That Guy Dick Miller premiered at SXSW 2014.

Jason also co-executive produced and wrote music for Max Winslow and the House of Secrets, (starring Chad Michael Murray and Tanner Buchanan) which won Best Feature Film at the Burbank International Film Festival and Crystal Palace International Film Festival.

Jason also creates original music for a wide range of national television programming, including Cartoon Network's Teen Titans Go!, Mike Tyson Mysteries, Extra and TMZ. Other TV shows including American Idol, The Bachelor, The Bachelorette and many more.

== List of movies and series ==
- The Passing (2005)
- Inside (2006)
- Night of the Living Dead 3D (2006)
- TMZ (TV Show 2007)
- Tapped (2009)
- American Grindhouse (2010)
- Hardflip (2012)
- Night of the Living Dead 3D: Re-Animation (2012)
- Teen Titans Go! (TV Show 2013)
- The Contractor (TV movie, 2013)
- Mike Tyson Mysteries (TV Show 2014)
- That Guy Dick Miller (2014)
- The Dog Who Saved Easter (TV movie, 2014)
- The Dog Who Saved Summer (2015)
- Crime Watch Daily (TV Show 2015)
- A Christmas Reunion (TV movie, 2015)
- The Other Mother (TV movie, 2017)
- F.R.E.D.I. (2018)
- Mommy Be Mine (TV movie, 2018)
- Christmas Wonderland (TV movie, 2018)
- Max Winslow and the House of Secrets (2020)
- Saved by Grace (2022)
- Camp Hideout (2023)
