= Max Winslow and the House of Secrets =

2019 science-fiction thriller film

- Directed by: Sean Olson
- Written by: Jeff Wild
- Produced by: Johnny Remo
- Starring: Chad Michael Murray; Sydne Mikelle; Tanner Buchanan; Emery Kelly; Jade Chynoweth; Jason Genao; Marina Sirtis
- Cinematography: Isaac Alongi
- Edited by: Sean Olson
- Music by: Jason Brandt
- Production company: SkipStone Pictures
- Release dates: September 7, 2019 (Burbank); May 29, 2020
- Running time: 98 minutes

Max Winslow and the House of Secrets is a 2019 science fiction thriller film written by Jeff Wild, produced by Johnny Remo and directed by Sean Olson. It is produced by SkipStone Pictures in association with Standing Room Only Cinema and BFY Productions and released theatrically through 3-D Live. The film stars Sydne Mikelle, Tanner Buchanan, Jade Chynoweth, Emery Kelly, Jason Genao with Marina Sirtis and Chad Michael Murray.

== Plot ==
The movie begins with a bunch of newscasters talking about the many accomplishments of genius Atticus Virtue before switching to high school student Max Winslow. Max lives with her mother and brother, her dad having left when she was five years old. Max is socially awkward and spends most of her time on computers, never connecting with people in real life. Max's family is in financial trouble and Max keeps hoping that her dad will come back to support them, despite not having seen him for several years.

At school later that day, narcissist Sophia Peach pulls up to school in her mom's car and snaps a selfie before getting out and nearly being run down by bully Aiden Ross on his skateboard. Aiden pushes past Max's brother Ethan, calling him a loser before moving on. In gym class, gamer Benny Carrasco sits out on the bleachers and plays a video game on his iPad. When the gym teacher gets his attention, Benny claims he has a note from his mother saying he has tendinitis (on account of playing video games all night).

In class, Sophia and Max present their poetry for the class (Sophia having made the poem about herself) and during Max's presentation of computer code, which she claims to be poetry in motion, a holographic image of Atticus Virtue is suddenly projected on the screen when the lights go out. He has taken over the high school's TV system and says that he is choosing five students to compete for a chance to win his elite, AI-powered mansion. At 3:16 pm, the students that were chosen are shown a text message saying "YES" on their screens. These students include Sophia, Aiden, Benny (who was too busy playing his game in the gym to pay attention to Mr. Virtue's announcement and has no idea what he has been chosen for), Max, and a popular student named Connor Lawson.

Connor finds out the next day that he has been accepted to an Ivy League school on a lacrosse scholarship, but unbeknownst to his parents (who are thrilled), he just wants to play his music and write songs. Max's mom Kathy agrees to let her daughter participate in the competition only if she texts her every hour. A limo picks up the kids and they chat on the way to the mansion, with Aiden pointing out that they are enemies once they arrive.

The kids are introduced to the AI system of the mansion, HAVEN (Home Automated Venture): The House of Tomorrow, who gives them Chick-Fil-A. While the kids are eating, Mr. Virtue appears on the table as a hologram and explains that he is away on business, but will be joining them again very soon. He directs them to another room for dessert, including jelly beans, gummy bears and chocolates, plus anything else the kids could want.

While exploring the room, the lights suddenly go out and the door locks, signaling that the game has begun. The kids are informed they have three chances to figure out a six-digit code that will unlock the door, or they'll be stuck there forever. After Sophia tries typing in her phone's password (999999), Max quickly figures out that Mr. Virtue gave them a clue when he mentioned what kind of desserts were in the room. She gets Benny and Connor to count the gummy bears and chocolates while she counts out the jelly beans, coming up with 89, 96 and 76. When Sophia tries the code, it is still wrong. After Max asks if they all counted correctly, Benny admits that he ate two gummy bears, making the code 89, 98 and 76. This time, Aiden punches in the code and is told that he has won the first game.

The kids split up to explore the rest of the mansion and Max goes down the stairs into the basement, where she finds a breath-activated door. HAVEN warns her that no one is allowed in the basement, ever, and she rejoins Benny and Connor by the piano. Sophia, live-streaming on her phone while looking for a bathroom finds one and is almost immediately locked inside. As she panics and begins to cry for help, a mirror image of herself asks her why she would want to get out while smiling at her evilly.

Aiden explores the kitchen and tries to grab a beer out of the fridge, but is stopped by HAVEN as he is not at the legal drinking age. When she offers an alternative, he rudely tells her to shut up. HAVEN asks if he is going to keep being mean and starts slamming all the drawers and cabinets, warning him that she can be mean, too or he can be nice and they can be friends so she can tell him secrets. Aiden agrees and she tells him to check out the elevator.

Meanwhile, Benny has discovered a note in a vase he accidentally broke, telling him to look for a secret door, which he finds with some help from HAVEN. He discovers an incredibly realistic VR helmet and immediately puts it on. Connor and Max, the two having formed an alliance, explore a dark room upstairs with a toy piano in the center. When Connor winds it up, the room begins to fill with smoke and the doors lock.

Aiden, having found the elevator, asks HAVEN what he is supposed to do now, and she tells him to enjoy the ride before he is violently rocked back and forth and plunged into a realistic simulation. He gets out and finds himself back at the high school. When he goes outside, a man is waiting for him with a baseball bat.

Benny works his way through a maze-like corridor downstairs and begins what he believes to be a new level, more difficult than the last. When his VR character is hurt in the game, he is shocked in real life. He makes his way back to where he came from and tries to remove the helmet, but it won't budge. HAVEN asks him what is wrong, as she thought he liked playing games, and informs him that this game has only just begun.

Max begins to pass out from smoke inhalation, so Connor uses a clue card on top of the piano (The CAGED Bird Sings) to solve the puzzle and free them. He carries Max out to the living room and is about to perform mouth-to-mouth but she wakes up, asking him what happened. HAVEN congratulates him for winning that game, to which Max angrily replies that it wasn't a game. HAVEN asks how it felt to have someone with her.

Sophia's mirror image tells her to stop doubting that this is what she wants: just her, all the time. Unable to stand seeing the messed-up version of herself staring at her, Sophia turns on the hot water in the shower to fog up the mirror, to which her image replies that she can't cover up what she is. Aiden is asked by the man if he knows why he is there, to which he nods and follows him to a field.

Max and Connor build a fort in the living room and communicate through paper and pen so HAVEN can't hear what they're really saying as they talk about random things out loud to throw her off, one of which is Connor asking Max out, to which she declines. Max hacks into her neighbor's doorbell and tells him to go get her mom for help, but HAVEN shuts her down. The two decide that they need to find the others, but they are stopped by Mr. Virtue's robotic knight in shining armor, Sir Mordred. With his sword pointed at her, Sir Mordred orders Max to confine Connor to a chair with straps which materializes in front of them. Once she has done so, Connor is pulled backward through some double doors. Max runs after him and flings the doors open, but he is gone.

Connor finds himself in a cheesy black-and-white TV show setting, still strapped to the chair, and his parents appear on either side of him encouraging him to sign the Ivy League scholarship papers to make them proud and set his future in stone. The man in Aiden's simulation tosses a baseball at the boy, who swings and misses a few times before the man starts to bully him, calling him weak and a loser, among other things. Aiden asks his dad why he's doing this to him.

Sophia tries to block out her mirror image as a timer appears below it. HAVEN says that she can leave the room, but by doing so all of her social media platforms and followers will be deleted. The mirror image tries to stop Sophia, saying that she is nothing without them, but Sophia disagrees and frees herself from her prison.

Max, while trying to look for Connor, finds Mr. Virtue upstairs, who offers her a way out. Max asks about the others, but he claims that following him through a glowing door is the only way. Max quickly figures out that Mr. Virtue is actually HAVEN, who is projecting a holographic image of her creator and tells her that the real Mr. Haven is trapped in the basement with her. Max is forced inside the door by Sir Mordred and the simulation she is thrust into is her worst memory: The day her dad walked out of her life, leaving her only a necklace with a flash drive.

As Aiden's dad runs out of baseballs and he continues to bully his son, Aiden suddenly realizes that he doesn't have to be like him, nor does he want to anymore. Aiden's dad tells him to take it back but Aiden refuses, and walks away, ending his simulation. Benny, faced with his toughest challenge yet while still trapped inside the VR helmet, is told that the only way to win is to lose. He decides to let go and finds himself back where he started, whipping off the helmet and escaping his virtual reality prison.

Connor admits to his "parents" the truth: He doesn't even like lacrosse; He's just playing it to make them happy. He refuses to sign the agreement and is released from the chair, with the TV set fading back to reality. Max confronts her father and asks him why he left so many years ago. She is told that it is because he fell in love with someone else, but he offers her a way to make it up to her, producing a little box with a red button. He says that it was given to him by HAVEN and that if Max decides to press it, something bad will happen to the real Mr. Winslow.

Max realizes that she doesn't need to press the button. She decides to forgive her father and move on. As her dad disappears, she finds Connor and they are reunited with the others on the upstairs balcony outside the mansion. Max decides that the best way to get out is to free Mr. Virtue. Remembering that there are balloons by the door where they first came in filled with Mr. Virtue's breath, the kids make their way back there.

HAVEN figures out what they are up to and sends out her micro-security drones to pop the balloons. Max manages to save one and is covered by Connor as she makes her way to the basement. She is able to avoid the security drones and successfully unlocks the door where she finds HAVEN's motherboard. HAVEN congratulates her on a job well done and claims that she was programmed to fix the bad kids (Sophia's narcissism, Aiden's bullying, Benny's gaming addiction, Connor's lies to his parents, and Max's anti-social behavior). Max uses the flash drive her dad gave her to erase HAVEN, opening another door where she finally comes face-to-face with the real Atticus Virtue, having been watching the kids the whole time.

When she asks him why he has done this to them, he explains that if technology can cause problems it can also fix them, better than any therapy or prescription drug ever could, and reveals that the whole contest was a huge test run for his new program. When he asks Max if it worked, she admits that it did, and Mr. Virtue informs Max that she has won the mansion.

Outside in the daylight, Sophia turns off her phone and Aiden gives Benny a handful of candy he smuggled out of the house. Max's mom pulls up in her car worried sick and demands an explanation from Mr. Virtue, who says that Max has won the contest and that the mansion is hers. As Sophia, Aiden and Benny depart, Max approaches Connor and asks if it is too late to take him up on that date, to which he smiles and agrees. The movie ends with Mr. Virtue showing Max, her mom, and Connor the house and him officially passing the keys to Max.

As Connor plays a song he wrote for Max over the end credits, it is revealed that Benny stopped playing video games and started playing medieval role playing, being a natural at it; Sophia created new social media accounts, this time snapping photos of nature and getting double the followers she had previously; Aiden started being nice and became a Big Brother; Connor agreed to take the lacrosse scholarship, but only if he could major in Music; Atticus Virtue continued to work on projects in secret and mentors Max via hologram; HAVEN was mysteriously shut down that night at the mansion, but it is rumored that her code still exists on the dark web; and Max has had multiple scholarship offers from elite universities, but is mainly focused on being a normal high school girl and spending time with her boyfriend, Connor.

== Cast ==
- Chad Michael Murray as Atticus Virtue
- Marina Sirtis as H.A.V.E.N.
- Sydne Mikelle as Max Winslow
- Tanner Buchanan as Connor Lawson
- Emery Kelly as Aiden
- Jade Chynoweth as Sophia Peach
- Jason Genao as Benny
- Anton Starkman as Ethan Winslow
- Tyler Christopher as Wade Lawson
- Candice Michele Barley as Tammy Lawson
- John Littlefield as Man With Bat
- Juli Tapken as Cathy Winslow
- Chuck Meré as Will Winslow
- Han Soto as Coach Allen
- Cassie Self as Sophia's Mom
- Billy Chase Goforth as Mr. Boxer

== Production ==
Filming took place in Northwest Arkansas in Bentonville, Fayetteville and Rogers in January 2019.

Editing took place in Burbank, California. Sound Design was done by Andres Boulton, color correction by Light Bender Studios and the film was scored by Jason Brandt.

== Release ==
The film premiered at the Burbank International Film Festival on September 7, 2019. It also screened at the 2019 Shriekfest and was scheduled to play in the Newport Beach Film Festival, Arizona International Film Festival, International Horror and Sci-Fi Film Festival, and Sci-Fi-London before theaters were shut down due to the COVID-19 pandemic.

== Reception ==
=== Box office ===
Due to limited theater exposure and few films playing due to the COVID-19 pandemic, Max Winslow was #2 at the box office in its opening weekend, grossing just $128.

=== Critical response ===
Rotten Tomatoes gives the film an 80% approval rating based on 15 reviews, with an average score of 5.7/10.

Bobby LePire of Film Threat gave the film a positive review, writing: "Max Winslow And The House Of Secrets is an exceptional movie. Before the film had even been on for 10-minutes, I was already entranced. Wild’s script has no fat to trim, setting up each of the main characters well. While the story isn’t new, there are enough twists or variations for it to come across as refreshing and unique."

=== Awards ===
The film was nominated for four awards at the 2019 Burbank International Film Festival, including Best Feature, Best Score, Best Actor for Chad Michael Murray and Best Actress for Jade Chynoweth. The film won Best Feature Film at the festival. Max Winslow won Best of Fest and Audience Choice at the Fayetteville Film Festival.
