= Ana Maria in Novela Land =

- Theatrical release poster
- Directed by: Georgina Garcia Riedel
- Written by: Georgina Garcia Riedel; Jose Nestor Marquez
- Story by: Jose Nestor Marquez
- Produced by: Synthetic Cinema International
- Starring: Edy Ganem; Luis Guzmán; Michael Steger; Elizabeth Peña
- Cinematography: Tobias Datum
- Edited by: Phillip J. Bartell
- Distributed by: Fluency
- Release date: February 27, 2015
- Running time: 88 minutes
- Country: United States
- Languages: English; Spanish

Ana Maria in Novela Land is a 2015 romantic comedy film about a titular superfan switching places with her favorite telenovela character, Ariana Tomosa. It opened theatrically on February 27, 2015, in select markets through AMC, and stars Edy Ganem, Luis Guzmán, Michael Steger, Juan Pablo Gamboa and Elizabeth Peña in her final film role. It was developed and distributed by Fluency, as part of NBC Universal.

== Plot ==
Ana Maria is a bored twentysomething living in Los Angeles. After she gets fired from her job, bails on her best friend, and blows off her sister's bridal fitting, Ana Maria gets into a fight with her mother and father about where her life is going. Her only solace at the end of a crummy day is watching the telenovela Pasión Sin Límites (Passion Without Limits) which features her favorite bad girl character, Ariana Tomosa. In the novela, Ariana has just been blackmailed by the evil lawyer Schmidt after being caught in a love triangle between the wealthy Eduardo and his sexy son Armando.

When both Ana Maria and Ariana simultaneously complain about their lives, lightning strikes and the two women switch places. Ana Maria thinks she's having the best dream ever and begins to live out all of her novela fangirl fantasies as Ariana: romancing the two leading men and enjoying the pampered life of the volatile leading lady. Back in the real world, Ariana believes she's been kidnapped, runs away from Ana Maria's family, slaps a cop and gets bailed out of jail by Ana Maria's neighbor, the cute boy next door, Tony. In Novela Land, Ana Maria's romp is interrupted when she gets a call from her best friend who warns that Ana Maria might be stuck in the show forever unless she can figure out why she ended up there in the first place. Meanwhile, in the real world, a psychiatrist diagnoses Ariana as having amnesia and advises Ana Maria's parents to cut their flaky daughter some slack. Comforted by Ana Maria's family and the lovestruck Tony, Ariana begins to enjoy her new life as Ana Maria.

The real Ana Maria has a made mess in the novela, alienating everyone and putting her life in jeopardy. But using her knowledge of novelas, Ana Maria conceives a plan to set things right: she fakes her own death, gathering all the characters at her wake and confesses that her selfishness has caused them all undue grief. Her admission triggers the novela's final twist: the return of the novela's secret villain played by the legendary Lupita Ferrer. After Schmidt shoots Ana Maria in the stomach, she takes one final selfie. This epic moment transports Ana Maria and Ariana back to their respective worlds. Ariana returns with the desire to explore a world bigger than the novela written for her and Ana Maria makes it back in time to serve as her sister's maid of honor – the supporting role she refused to play before the start of her journey.

== Cast ==
- Edy Ganem as Ana Maria / Ariana
- Michael Steger as Tony / Armando
- Luis Guzman as Schmidt
- Tamara Taylor as Dr. Acevedo Bechdel
- Mercedes Masohn as Ana Gloria
- Sung Kang as Korean Soap Star
- Nestor Serrano as Senor Soto
- Juan Pablo Gamboa as Eduardo
- Dyana Ortelli as Mercedes
- Carla Morrison as Laura
- Jessica Camacho as Officer Gonzales
- Lupita Ferrer as Senora De La Roca
- Elizabeth Peña as Senora Soto

== Production ==
The film was written by Georgina Garcia Riedel (How the Garcia Girls Spent Their Summer) and Jose Nestor Marquez (ISA) from a story by Jose Nestor Marquez. The movie was directed by Riedel. The picture was shot by Tobias Datum and edited by Phillip Bartell (Dear White People). It was produced by Synthetic Cinema International for Fluency.

== Release ==
The film premiered in the select markets of Los Angeles, Houston and Miami on February 27, 2015.

== Critical reception ==
The film received coverage in mainstream and Latino press outlets. Joey Leydon of Variety called it an "overlong but modestly amusing bilingual indie", opining that "Those who have at least a nodding acquaintance with the highly addictive serial dramas (telenovelas) will smile even more often than the uninitiated as director and co-scripter Georgina Garcia Riedel (“How the Garcia Girls Spent Their Summer”) affectionately satirizes both the limited-run series and their most avid aficionados."

Referring to the film as a "future slumber party classic", Inkoo Kang said in The Wrap, "This switching-places comedy warmly and trenchantly sends up the telenovela genre’s swooning melodrama and oversexed-but-prudish contradictions." She offered another positive take stating the film was: "A spirited dual performance by Edy Ganem and a pointed telenovela spoof breathe plenty of life into a comedy that offers comfort through familiarity."

Chuck Wilson of LA Weekly called the film ambitious and praised it for having a great set up. He also criticized it, saying, "By its nature, the telenovela world is funnier than ours, but here it's never as inspired as you might hope. Ganem and her talented co-stars work hard, but Riedel's pacing is always a beat or two behind their mad energy, making for a film that's enormously appealing but not quite addicting."

Bel Hernandez of Latin Heat said, "Director Georgina Garcia Riedel directing of the cast, has enabled the film to successful navigate from film to telenovela – with just enough of the stereotypical telenovela melodramatic acting to not get in the way."

Frank Scheck of The Hollywood Reporter wrote that "While this effort directed and co-scripted by Georgina Garcia Riedel lacks true comic inspiration, it provides some genial laughs along the way. ... Despite its relatively brief running time, the film runs out of comic steam long [before] the convoluted proceedings reach their conclusion, with the spoofery having the feel of an overextended variety show skit. But it's mostly enjoyable nonetheless, thanks largely to the charms of its young star who is clearly destined for bigger things."
