= Camp Hideout =

2023 film by Sean Olson

- Theatrical release poster
- Directed by: Sean Olson
- Written by: Kat Olson; C. Neil Davenport; Dave DeBorde
- Produced by: Jason Brown; Phillip Glasser
- Starring: Corbin Bleu; Ethan Drew; Amanda Leighton; Christopher Lloyd
- Cinematography: Issac Alongi
- Edited by: Sean Olson
- Music by: Jason Brandt
- Production companies: Called Higher Studios; PZAJ
- Distributed by: Roadside Attractions
- Release date: September 15, 2023
- Country: United States
- Language: English
- Box office: $1.1 million

Camp Hideout is a 2023 American coming-of-age comedy film written by Kat Olson, C. Neil Davenport and Dave DeBorde and directed by Sean Olson. It stars Corbin Bleu, Ethan Drew, Amanda Leighton and Christopher Lloyd.

== Synopsis ==
Noah is a troubled teen who nearly gets caught stealing a top-secret gadget from some big city thugs. After barely escaping, he decides to hide out at a summer camp that's run by the eccentric Falco and counselors Jake and Selena. As Noah tries to blend in with the rest of the rowdy campers, his crooked partners show up to steal the classified item, now in his possession.

== Cast ==
- Corbin Bleu as Jake
- Ethan Drew as Noah
- Amanda Leighton as Selena
- Christopher Lloyd as Falco
- Joshua Childs as Willis
- Josh Inocalla as Charlie
- Tyler Kowalski as Oliver
- Luca Alexander as Trey
- Jenna Raine Simmons as Mallory
- Zion Wyatt as Chase
- Elle Wesley Phoebe
- Genesis Juarez as Amy
- Tucker Brown as Paulie
- Raphael Vittorio Ruggero as Drew

== Production ==
Filming occurred in Franklin, Tennessee in October 2021.

== Release ==
In May 2023, it was announced that Roadside Attractions acquired U.S. distribution rights to the film. Camp Hideout was released in theaters on September 15, 2023.

=== Critical response ===
On the review aggregator website Rotten Tomatoes, 40% of five critics' reviews are positive, with an average rating of 4.8/10.
