= Jade Chynoweth =

American actress and dancer (born 1998)

- Born: August 21, 1998 (age 27); Park City, Utah, U.S.
- Occupations: Actress; dancer
- Years active: 2012–present
- Website: jadechynoweth.info

Jade Chynoweth (shi-noth, born August 21, 1998) is an American actress and dancer.

She is known for her roles as young Artemisia in the 2014 epic action film 300: Rise of an Empire and Carmen in the 2016 superhero film Batman v Superman: Dawn of Justice, for her recurring role as Kathleen Nolan on the TNT television series The Last Ship and Odalie Allen on the Starz/YouTube Premium series Step Up.

== Biography ==
She first appeared as the Street Dancer in 2012 comedy musical series Dr. Fubalous. Her debut film role was as young Artemisia in the 2014 epic historical fantasy war film 300: Rise of an Empire.

In December 2018, she appeared on The Voice dancing while singer Halsey performed her song "Without Me". The performance received backlash for how Halsey "sensually" danced with Chynoweth; the backlash in turn was criticized as homophobic and Halsey defended her performance.

== Personal life ==
Chynoweth is in a relationship with singer-songwriter/dancer/actor Carlito Olivero, who placed third on the third season of The X Factor USA.

== Filmography ==
Film roles
Year	Title	Role	Notes
2014	300: Rise of an Empire	13-year-old Artemisia	
2015	Glee	Dancer	
2015	Just Us	Jax	
2016	Batman v Superman: Dawn of Justice	Carmen	
2016	Girls Just Wanna Have Fight	Jane	
2017	7Seconds	Olivia	
2019	Step Up: Year of the Dance	USA Phantom Dancer	
2019	Max Winslow and the House of Secrets	Sophia Peach	

Television roles
Year	Title	Role	Notes
2012	Dr. Fubalous	Street Dancer	Episode: "Training Day Off"
2015–2018	The Last Ship	Kathleen Nolan	Recurring role, 13 episodes
2018–2022	Step Up	Odalie Allen	Main role
2018	The Voice	Herself / Halsey's partner	Episode: "Live Finale Results"
