= Shawn Robinson =

American stuntman (1974–2015)

- Born: May 15, 1974; Los Angeles, California, U.S.
- Died: July 28, 2015 (aged 41); New Orleans, Louisiana, U.S.
- Occupation: Stuntman
- Years active: 1991-2015

Shawn Robinson (May 15, 1974 – July 28, 2015) was an American stuntman.

== Career ==
Robinson performed stunts over 20 years, including in films such as Guardians of the Galaxy, the Transformers film series, Hook, Behind Enemy Lines, War of the Worlds, Captain America: The Winter Soldier and Horrible Bosses 2. In television, he took part in episodes of Criminal Minds, Lost and NCIS: Los Angeles.

== Life and death ==
Robinson's father was stuntman Dar Robinson.

On July 28, 2015, Robinson was found dead of heart failure in his hotel room in New Orleans, Louisiana, after missing work on the film Deepwater Horizon. He was 41. Lionsgate released a statement:

On behalf of the producers, cast and crew of Deepwater Horizon and the entire Lionsgate family, we want to send our most heartfelt condolences to the family of Shawn Robinson. Shawn was a gifted stunt performer and a beloved and trusted member of our crew. We grieve with his family over this tremendous loss.

Disney's live action remake of The Jungle Book is dedicated to Robinson and Garry Shandling's memories.
