= Elizabeth Peña =

American actress (1959–2014)

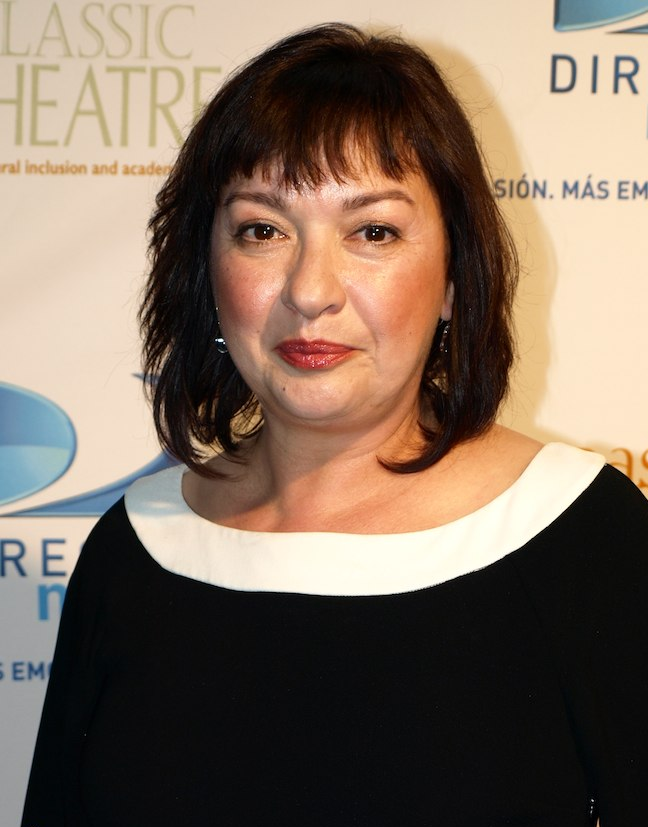
- Peña in 2009
- Born: Elizabeth Maria Peña; September 23, 1959; Elizabeth, New Jersey, U.S.
- Died: October 14, 2014 (aged 55); Los Angeles, California, U.S.
- Occupation: Actress
- Years active: 1979–2014
- Spouses: William Kibler (m. 1988; div. 1993); Hans Rolla (m. 1994)
- Children: 2

Elizabeth Maria Peña (September 23, 1959 – October 14, 2014) was an American actress. Her film credits include Down and Out in Beverly Hills (1986), Batteries Not Included, La Bamba (both 1987), Jacob's Ladder (1990), Rush Hour (1998), and Nothing like the Holidays (2008). Peña won the 1996 Independent Spirit Award for Best Supporting Female and a Bravo Award for Outstanding Actress in a Feature Film for her work in Lone Star (1996). She also voiced Rosa Santos in the animated television series Maya & Miguel (2004-2007) and Mirage in the animated film The Incredibles (2004).

== Early life ==
Peña was born in Elizabeth, New Jersey, on September 23, 1959, to Mario and Estella Margarita Peña. Mario Peña was a Cuban actor, playwright, director, and designer, and Estella Margarita Peña was a producer. The Peña family moved to Cuba when Elizabeth was less than a year old; she returned to the United States at the age of nine, after which time she and her family resided in New York City. Peña's parents founded the Theatre Ensemble. In 1977, Peña graduated from New York's High School of Performing Arts.

== Career ==
In 1979, Peña made her film debut in Leon Ichaso's El Super, a "moving and melancholy comedy about a family of lower middle class Cuban refugees attempting to adjust to life in Spanish Harlem". She worked with Ichaso again in the director's next feature, Crossover Dreams.

Peña starred in I Married Dora, a sitcom (1987–1988), as the title character. She also starred in producer John Sayles's series Shannon's Deal (1990–1991).

Peña appeared in films such as Nothing like the Holidays, La Bamba, Down and Out in Beverly Hills, Jacob's Ladder, *batteries not included, Blue Steel, 1997's Gridlock'd as ER Admissions Person (under the name Elizabeth Anne Dickinson), Vibes, and Rush Hour.

In 1996, Sayles wrote and directed the mystery film Lone Star and again cast Peña in a co-starring role, for which she won the 1996 Independent Spirit Award for Best Supporting Actress and a Bravo Award for Outstanding Actress in a Feature Film from the National Council of La Raza.

In 2002, Peña starred in Showtime's Resurrection Blvd. as Bibi Corrades in the episode "Justicia"; she directed an episode of the show. In 2003, she appeared in and directed "It Was Fun While It Lasted", an episode of The Brothers Garcia.

Peña was the fourth Latina to join the Directors' Guild of America.

Peña also voiced Mirage in Pixar's animated film The Incredibles. She guest-starred in the 18th episode of season 2 of Numb3rs as Sonya Benavides, and in season 4 of Modern Family as Pilar, the Colombian mother of Gloria Pritchett.

Peña co-founded the Hispanic Organization of Latin Actors. She acted in 45 films.

== Personal life and death ==
Peña married television producer William Stephan Kibler in 1988. Their marriage ended in divorce. In 1994, Peña married Hans Rolla, with whom she had two children, Fiona and Kaelan.

Peña died on October 14, 2014, at Cedars-Sinai Medical Center in Los Angeles, California, at the age of 55. The cause of death listed on her death certificate was cirrhosis of the liver due to alcohol, which caused acute gastrointestinal bleeding, cardiogenic shock and cardiac arrest. Peña was cremated and buried at Green-Wood Cemetery in Brooklyn, New York, alongside the ashes of her mother, Estella Margarita Toirac.

== Filmography ==
=== Film ===
Year	Title	Role	Notes
1979	El Super	Aurelita	
1980	Times Square	Disco Hostess	
1981	They All Laughed	Rita	
1985	Crossover Dreams	Liz Garcia	
1986	Down and Out in Beverly Hills	Carmen	
1987	La Bamba	Rosie Morales	
1987	*batteries not included	Marisa Esteval	
1988	Vibes	Consuelo	
1990	Blue Steel	Tracy Perez	
1990	Jacob's Ladder	Jezebel "Jezzie" Pipkin	
1992	The Waterdance	Rosa	
1994	Dead Funny	Vivian "Viv" Saunders	
1995	Across the Moon	Carmen	
1995	Free Willy 2: The Adventure Home	Kate Haley	
1996	Lone Star	Pilar Cruz	
1997	Gridlock'd	Admissions Person	
1998	Rush Hour	Detective Tania Johnson	
1998	Strangeland	Toni Gage	
1999	Seven Girlfriends	Martha	
2001	Things Behind the Sun	Carmen	
2001	Tortilla Soup	Leticia Naranjo	
2001	Impostor	Midwife	
2002	Zig Zag	Ms. Tate	
2004	The Incredibles	Mirage (voice)	
2005	How the Garcia Girls Spent Their Summer	Lolita	
2005	Transamerica	Margaret	
2005	Down in the Valley	Gale	
2005	Sueño	Mirabela	
2005	The Lost City	Miliciana Muñoz	
2007	Adrift in Manhattan	Isabel Parades	
2007	Goal II: Living the Dream	Rosa Maria	
2007	D-War	FBI Agent Linda Perez	
2007	Love Comes Lately	Esperanza	
2008	A Single Woman	Storyteller	
2008	Nothing like the Holidays	Anna Rodriguez	
2009	Mother and Child	Amanda	
2009	Down for Life	Mrs. Castro	
2011	The Perfect Family	Christina Reyes	
2013	Plush	Dr. Lopez	
2015	Grandma	Carla	Posthumous release
2015	Girl on the Edge	Esther	Posthumous release
2015	Ana Maria in Novela Land	Senora Soto	Posthumous release
2018	The Song of Sway Lake	Marlena	Final film role; Posthumous release

=== Television ===
Year	Title	Role	Notes
1985	Cagney & Lacey	Adelita Carrena	Episode: "Ordinary Hero"
1985	T. J. Hooker	Maria	Episode: "Rip-Off"
1986	Hill Street Blues	Alice	Episode: "Come and Get It"
1986	Tough Cookies	Connie Rivera	Main role, 6 episodes
1987–1988	I Married Dora	Dora Calderon	Main role, 13 episodes
1989	Shannon's Deal	Lucy Acosta	Television film
1990	Drug Wars: The Camarena Story	Mika Camarena	Miniseries, 3 episodes
1990–1991	Shannon's Deal	Lucy Acosta	Main role, 11 episodes
1993	Dream On	Debra	Episode: "Super Freak"
1993–1994	L.A. Law	Jinx Baldasseri	4 episodes
1994	Roommates	Lisa	Television film
1995	The Outer Limits	Dr. Jennifer Martinez	Episode: "Living Hell"
1995	The Invaders	Ellen Garza	Miniseries, 2 episodes
1997	The Second Civil War	Christina	Television film
1997	Dead Man's Gun	Gisella	Episode: "Fortune Teller"
2000–2001	Resurrection Blvd.	Beatriz "Bibi" Corrales	21 episodes
2002–2003	Boston Public	Superintendent Elizabeth Vasquez	2 episodes
2003	CSI: Miami	Mercedes Escalante	Episode: "Simple Man"
2003	The Brothers García	—N/a	Director, 1 episode
2004	Suburban Madness	Clara Harris	Television film
2004	NCIS	FBI Agent Lina Reyes	Episode: "Terminal Leave"
2004	Justice League	Paran Dul (voice)	Episode: "Starcrossed"
2005	Without a Trace	Rosie Diaz	Episode: "Neither Rain Nor Sleet"
2005–2009	Maya & Miguel	Rosa Santos (voice)	Main cast
2005	Numb3rs	Sonya Benavides	Episode: "Assassin"
2005	Justice League Unlimited	Paran Dul (voice)	Episode: "Hunter's Moon"
2006	Minoriteam	Maria, Gold Digger (voice)	Episode: "Landon in Love"
2007	American Dad!	Store Owner (voice)	Episode: "American Dream Factory"
2008	Racing for Time	Flores	Television film
2009	Ghost Whisperer	Marla	Episode: "This Joint's Haunted"
2011	Off the Map	Inez	4 episodes
2012	Prime Suspect	Gloria Lopez	Episode: "Ain't No Sunshine"
2013	Major Crimes	Rosa Vega	Episode: "Under the Influence"
2013	Modern Family	Pilar Ramirez	2 episodes
2014	Matador	Maritza Sandoval	Recurring role, 7 episodes

=== Video games ===
Year	Title	Role	Notes
2004	The Incredibles	Mirage	Voice
2013	Disney Infinity	Mirage	Voice

== See also ==
- List of Cuban Americans
