= The Contractor (2013 film) =

- Theatrical release poster
- Directed by: Sean Olson
- Written by: Sean Olson; Bradford Holt; Peter Sullivan
- Produced by: Marc Ferrero
- Starring: Danny Trejo; Christina Cox; Brad Rowe; Taylor Spreitler; Maya Stojan; Arianne Zucker
- Cinematography: Joseph M. Setele
- Edited by: Sean Olson
- Music by: Jason Brandt
- Production company: Lions Gate Entertainment
- Release date: September 10, 2013
- Running time: 87 minutes
- Country: United States
- Language: English

The Contractor is a 2013 American direct-to-video crime drama thriller film starring Danny Trejo as the title character. The film was directed by Sean Olson, written by Bradford Holt and Olson, and produced by Lionsgate. It follows a contractor working for the Chase family. He turns nasty after being relieved of his duty and reveals himself to have been out to harm the family all along. The family must now combine their efforts to fight the menace. The Contractor was released in both DVD and digital download format on September 10, 2013.

== Plot ==
The film starts with a suspected murderer being apprehended by the police. He adamantly claims that he is innocent and only wanted to protect his girlfriend, but his pleas fall on deaf ears. Three years later, in December, in Malibu, California, Elizabeth "Liz" Chase (Christina Cox) is busily working on her family's apartment, which needs to be remodelled before a charity event to be held fourteen days later. In addition, she has to take care of her teenage daughter McKenzie. Liz and her lawyer spouse, Paul Chase, decide to hire a contractor to help out with the construction in order for Liz to cope.

Initially unable to find a suitable contractor, Paul chances upon Desert Sun Contracting, which is owned by shady contractor Javier Reyes, who has been secretly stalking the family for a while, snapping photographs of them and tapping into their calls. Not intent on constructing the house, Reyes begins to plant pieces of evidence to frame Paul for committing infidelity, including a doctored restaurant receipt. After Liz grows suspicious of Reyes, she asks Paul to ask him to leave. Reyes leaves bitterly, but promises to return.

The Chases hire a new contractor. However, the persistent Reyes continues to stalk them. Meanwhile, Liz gives Paul the cold shoulder, believing that he really has had an affair, after seeing edited phone records planted by Reyes. After doing some extensive research, she finds out that Jorge Reyes (the real name of Javier Reyes) had previously been arrested for contempt of the court. It is revealed that his son, Omar Reyes, was the prosecuted murderer arrested three years ago, and had been killed in a mass assault in prison. Reyes is out to avenge his son's death by targeting Paul Chase, a member of the prosecution team in charge of Omar's trial.

Liz shares her findings with Paul. Promising to keep a watchful eye, Paul hires his thug acquaintances to eliminate Reyes. They fail to do so, and Reyes knocks them out, escaping with a bruised eye. He then sends Liz a photograph of Paul's secretary rubbing his neck, and that is enough to make Liz think Paul is being unfaithful to her. Distraught, she confronts Paul, who vehemently denies her accusations. They argue, and Liz forces Paul to leave.

Reyes proceeds to kidnap McKenzie, who has lied that she was going to a friend's party but in actuality was making out with her boyfriend Chris. Having left her phone in Chris' car, she cannot be contacted. Liz finds out McKenzie was never at the party and just as she begins to worry, Reyes appears outside her door, holding McKenzie at gunpoint. Reyes lures Paul back to the house and attacks him when he does. Paul grabs Reyes' gun, causing a diversion and thus allowing the mother and daughter to escape. They hide in one of the stables and Liz knocks Reyes unconscious for a while by hitting him with a large spade. They start to play hide-and-seek again. Reyes eventually finds Liz and they engage in a fierce struggle. In a blur, Liz grabs the firearm from Reyes and pulls the trigger, killing him.

Determined to start their lives anew by moving house, the Chases give up their landed property to a friend of theirs. Liz is invited to attend the grand opening of the 200,000 square feet (19,000 m^{2})-large Elizabeth Chase Pediatric Respiratory Center.

== Cast ==
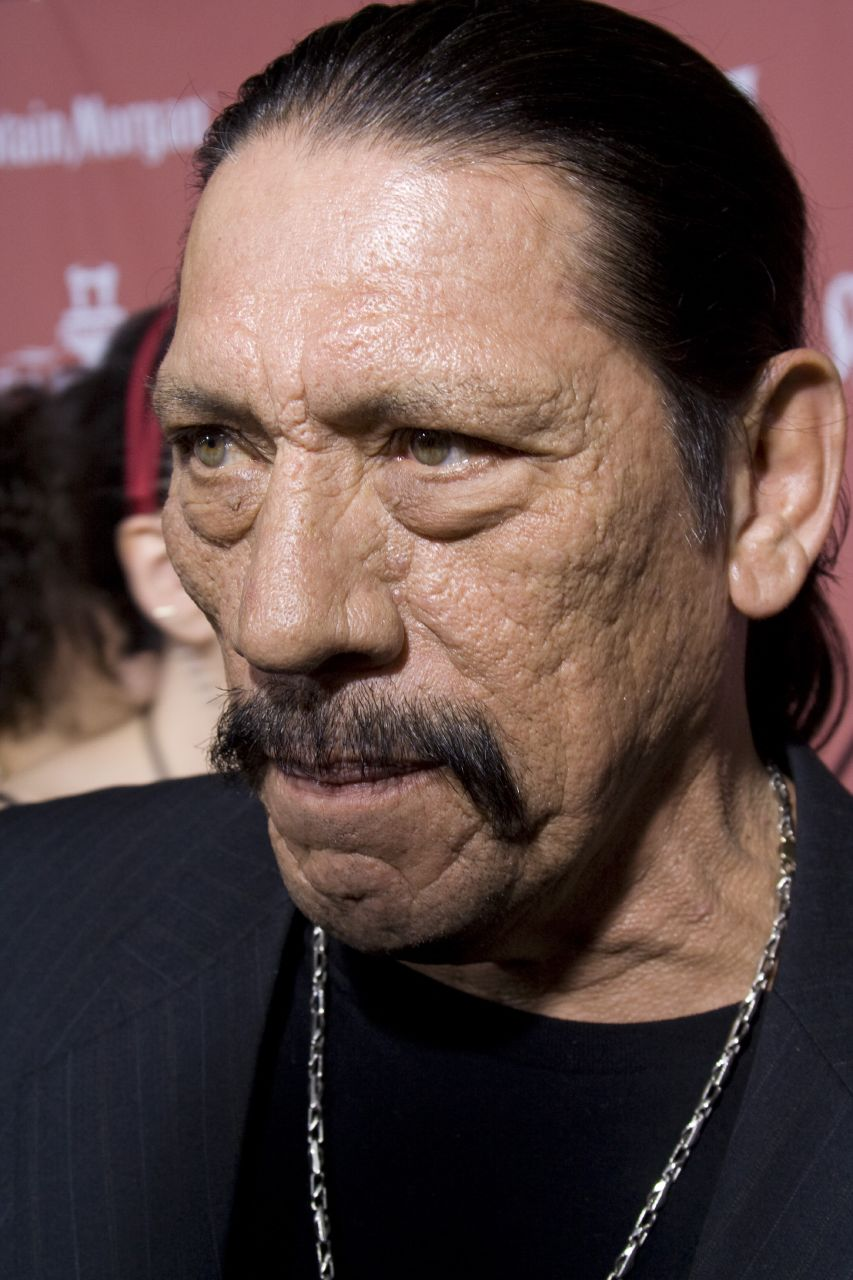
Danny Trejo played "The Contractor" Javier Reyes

- Danny Trejo as Javier Reyes / Jorges Reyes
- Brad Rowe as Paul Chase
- Christina Cox as Elizabeth "Liz" Chase
- Taylor Spreitler as McKenzie Chase
- Arianne Zucker as Kate
- Maya Stojan as Maria Parra
- Rene Moran as Omar Reyes

== Release and reception ==
The film was released on DVD and digital download outlets on September 10, 2013 by production company Lionsgate. A reviewer for Manly Movie gave the film a rating of 5 out of 10 and commented that "[t]his movie is worthless, unless in two years time a stoner finds value in it while stumbling upon it at 1:30am on TV. Although he'll need to be seriously shit-faced." Jason Coleman of Starpulse.com wrote, "There are actually some decent suspenseful bits in "The Contractor," but there's also some forced bits where big softy Danny seems a little out of his evil guy element. Thankfully his victims, an unsuspecting family played by Christina Cox and Brad Rowe, both seem to get their roles and play the creeped out thing decently. With both good and bad, "The Contractor" lives up to his occupational name."
