= Sean Olson =

American film director

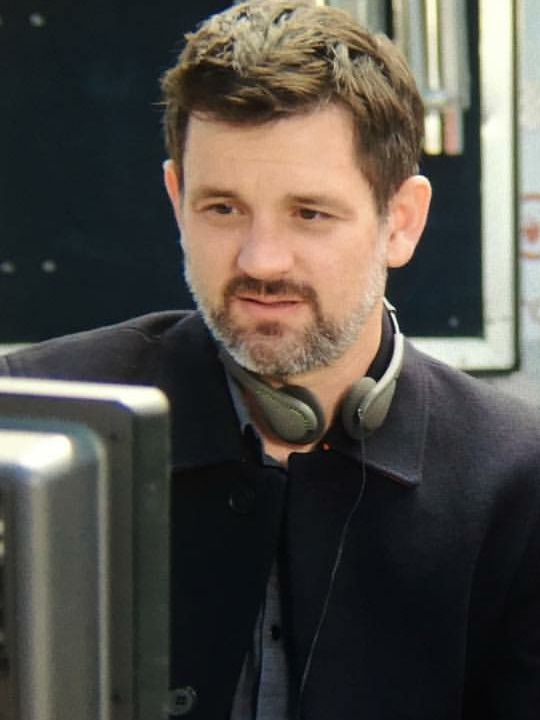
- Born: February 4, 1976 (age 49); Phoenix, Arizona
- Education: Bachelor of Fine Arts
- Alma mater: University of Arizona
- Occupation(s): Director, Editor, Screenwriter, Producer
- Years active: 1998-present
- Spouse: Katherine Olson
- Children: 2

Sean Olson (born February 4, 1976) is an American film director, producer, screenwriter and editor. He began as an editor for KPHO-TV, KMGH-TV, Extra-TV, Crime Watch Daily, How the Garcia Girls Spent Their Summer (2005) and Wyatt Earp's Revenge (2012). He has directed The Contractor (2013), The Other Mother (2017), and FREDI (2018) for which he was awarded Best of Fest at the Bentonville Film Festival.

In 2019, he directed Max Winslow and the House of Secrets, which won Best Feature Film at the Burbank International Film Festival. Max Winslow opened at number 2 at the box office in May 2020.

Sean directed and edited episodes of the We Tv series Kold x Windy (2023) and Camp Hideout (Christopher Lloyd, Corbin Bleu) which will release theatrically in the United States in September 2023.

== Feature films ==
Year	Title	Director	Editor	Writer	Producer
2005	How the Garcia Girls Spent Their Summer	No	Yes	No	No
2006	The Standard	No	Yes	No	No
2006	Inside	No	Yes	No	No
2010	The Dog Who Saved Christmas Vacation	No	Yes	No	No
2011	The Passing	No	Yes	No	No
2011	The Dog Who Saved Halloween	No	Yes	No	No
2011	The Perfect Student	No	Yes	No	No
2011	A Valentine's Date	No	Yes	No	No
2012	Stolen Child	No	Yes	No	No
2012	Wyatt Earp's Revenge	No	Yes	No	No
2013	The Contractor	Yes	Yes	Yes	No
2014	The Dog Who Saved Easter	Yes	Yes	Yes	Yes
2014	Christmas Under Wraps	No	Yes	No	No
2015	The Dog Who Saved Summer	Yes	Yes	No	No
2015	A Christmas Reunion	Yes	Yes	Yes	No
2017	The Other Mother	Yes	No	Yes	Yes
2017	A Question of Faith	No	Yes	No	No
2018	F.R.E.D.I.	Yes	Yes	Yes	Yes
2018	Mommy Be Mine	Yes	Yes	No	No
2018	Christmas Wonderland	Yes	Yes	No	No
2020	The Great Artist (Short Film)	No	Yes	No	No
2020	Max Winslow and the House of Secrets	Yes	Yes	No	Yes
2021	Squeaky Clean Mysteries: Hazardous Duty	Yes	Yes	No	No
2023	Never Alone For Christmas	No	Yes	No	No
2023	A Royal Christmas Surprise	No	Yes	No	No
2023	God's Country Song	No	Yes	No	No
2023	Camp Hideout	Yes	Yes	No	Yes

== Television series ==
Year	Title	Director	Editor	Writer	Producer
2022	Saved by Grace	No	Yes	No	No
2023	Kold x Windy	Yes	Yes	No	No
