= Greg Travis =

American stand-up comedian and actor (born 1958)

- Born: July 31, 1958 (age 67); Dallas, Texas, U.S.
- Occupations: Actor, comedian
- Parent(s): Gerald Travis; Elaine Dennehy-Travis
- Relatives: Stacey Travis (sister); William B. Travis (ancestor)

Greg Travis (born July 31, 1958) is an American stand-up comedian and actor.

Based in the U.S. he created the comedy character David Sleaze, The Punk Magician, in which he wore a punk rock-style wig and does a variety of bad magic tricks using audience participation. This routine appeared on Rodney Dangerfield's HBO specials.

== Early life ==
Travis was born July 31, 1958, in Dallas, Texas, the son of Gerald Travis and Elaine Dennehy-Travis, with one younger sister; actress Stacey Travis. At the age of twelve, Travis began performing as a magician and winning many school talent shows. In High school, he won the talent competition in the school talent shows and also won best comedy magician at the Texas Association of Magicians convention. In his senior year in high school, Travis became vice president of the Thespian Drama Club and made a feature-length film entitled "Joe Dynomite". Also he appeared in many of the school's play productions. After obtaining an Associate Arts degree at Richland College, Travis headed for Hollywood, where he attended Sherwood Oaks Film School.

== Career ==
=== Comedy ===
While attending film school Greg began performing stand up comedy at The Improv and Comedy Store. Six months later he appeared on "America's Search For Tomorrow's Stars". This led to regular spots at "Bud Friedman"s Improvisation". He began appearing as a regular guest on the talk show circuit, Dinah Shore, The Merv Griffin Show, a Steve Allen Special and Evening at the Improv. The William Morris Agency signed Greg as his representation. He began landing small acting roles in film and TV, while developing a strong stand-up act, headlining at all the major comedy clubs across the country. In 1986 he worked for Saturday Night Live making short comedy films, appearing regularly on Evening at the Improv he was also the opening act for stars like James Brown, Tom Jones and Dolly Parton. In 1990 Greg appeared on a Rodney Dangerfield HBO Special, which made his routine The Punk Magician famous. This led to him being the opening act for Cher on a long East Coast tour.

Greg has performed comedy on television shows such as: Surprise Surprise, Thicke of the Night, Sunday Funnies, Showtime Comedy Night, Comedy Club Network, Comic Strip Live, Evening at the Improv, Into the Night, The Tonight Show, Comedy Central, and Lewis Black's Root of all Evil.

=== Acting ===
Travis was cast in the co-starring role of Phil Newkirk in the film Showgirls. Showgirls was followed by such films as Lost Highway, Starship Troopers, Poodle Springs and Man on the Moon.

Travis also produced and starred in a theatrical production called "America the Bizarre" where he played seven different characters in full make-up and costume, ending with a dead on impression of Lord Buckley. He also received positive reviews for his portrayal of Andy Warhol in the stage play Girl of the Year. Travis has appeared in several television shows, including CSI Miami, Strong Medicine, and Cold Case.

Travis has worked with such directors as David Lynch, Paul Verhoeven, Bob Rafelson, and Miloš Forman. His recent roles include Rob Zombie's Halloween II, Zack Snyder's Watchmen as Andy Warhol, Night of the Living Dead 3D, and Sex & Death 101.

=== Filmmaking ===
After film school Greg began making short comedy videos with his New York City based friend David Daniel. Together they made “Last Tango in Poland”, “Carlos the Artist”, “1984 Now”, “Double Exposure”, “Complainer Vs. Complainer”, “Who’s Afraid Now”, “Hildegard” and “The Fine Line of Charlie James”. In 1984 Greg partnered with Steve Bishart and they co-wrote, co-produced with Greg Directing a 16mm feature-length black-and-white film noir “DARK SEDUCTION”, starring Tyler Horn as detective Dic Jones and Victoria Hughie as Vera The Vampiress. Greg continued to make short videos with fellow Texan and filmmaker Louis Roth such as “Dreamdate”, “The Last Date”, “Home Life”, “Ultra Dopes on Punk” and “Kaptain Komack on The Planet of Death”.

In 1986 Greg was hired to make short films for “Saturday Night Live” entitled “Andy Warhols 15 Second Workout” and a Nick Nolte spoof “Never Get Out Of Bed”. Later Greg directed two music videos which aired on MTV called "Immune System Breakdown" and "The Art of Noise". In 89/90 Greg directed two Independent pilots “GT Ink” for CBS and “The Decadants” for Playboy Cable.

As a screenwriter Greg has written twenty feature film screen plays. Three of which were for Paramount, Disney and HBO. In 2003 Greg wrote, directed a feature-length psychological thriller entitled “Night Creep”. Recently Greg wrote and directed a web series entitled Drama Kings www.dramakings.net. He continues to make short films, like “Eat The Rich”, “Super Spy Love” and “Hot Soup”. He is currently developing two feature-length films for production, “Bofugly” and “The Sinner”.

== Selected filmography ==
- 1980 Humanoids from the Deep as Mike Michaels, Radio Announcer
- 1987 Million Dollar Mystery as Actor
- 1991 True Identity as Orlando, Ticket Agent
- 1991 Paradise as Earl McCoy
- 1991 Shakes the Clown as Randi, The Rodeo Clown
- 1995 Showgirls as Phil Newkirk
- 1997 Starship Troopers as Network Correspondent
- 1997 Lost Highway as Tail Gate Driver
- 1998 Poodle Springs as Leonard
- 1998 Letters from a Killer as State Trooper
- 1999 Blood Type as Donnie
- 1999 Man on the Moon as ABC Executive
- 2000 Bar Hopping as Agent
- 2002 Landspeed as Clayton Winfree
- 2002 Paper Soldiers as Travis
- 2003 Night Creep as Lee Howard, also Director
- 2004 Toolbox Murders as Byron McLieb
- 2005 Mortuary as Eliot Cook
- 2005 Star Party as Booker
- 2006 The Last Stand as Buddy Linnow
- 2006 Edmond (short) as Edmond
- 2006 Night of the Living Dead 3D as Henry Cooper
- 2007 Sex & Death 101 as Magazine Stand Man
- 2007 A Talent for Trouble as Frank Steiner
- 2007 Hot Baby as 'Tex'
- 2007 Sin-Jin Smyth
- 2009 Halloween II as Deputy Neale
- 2009 Watchmen as Andy Warhol
- 2009 Tender as Hellfire as Mr. Deegan
- 2009 World Full of Nothing as TV Preacher
- 2010 Atlantis Down as Pete Hendrix
- 2010 The Boondocks as Jimmy Rebel
- 2010 Making of Sequestered as Casting Director
- 2010 The Trouble with Cali as Tom Wilcox
- 2011 Satin as Jimmi Crete
- 2011 Affecter as Mystery Man
- 2011 Dug Up as Sherriff Yates
- 2011 White T as Stage Manager
- 2011 The Bride of Frank (short) as Frank
- 2011 Showgirls 2: Penny's from Heaven as Phil
- 2011 Nobody Loses All the Time (short) as Warren Oates
- 2014 Midlife as David Stanton
