= Night of the Living =

Night of the Living may refer to:

- Night of the Living Bread
- Night of the Living Cat
- Night of the Living Carrots
- Night of the Living Baseheads
- Night of the Living Deb
- Night of the Living Doo
- Night of the Living Dorks
- Night of the Living Drag
- Night of the Living Drag Queens
- Night of the Living Dregs
- The Night of the Living Duck
- Night of the Living Homeless
- Night of the Living Wage
- The Simpsons: Night of the Living Treehouse of Horror
- Fred 2: Night of the Living Fred

== See also ==
- Night of the Living Dead (disambiguation)
