= Angel Devoid: Face of the Enemy =

1996 video game

- Developer: Electric Dreams Inc.
- Publisher: Mindscape
- Designer: Anthony Gomez
- Platforms: MS-DOS, Mac, PlayStation, Saturn
- Release: Windows: NA: February 1996; PlayStation: JP: 9 February 1996; Sega Saturn: JP: 16 February 1996
- Genre: Adventure
- Mode: Single-player

Angel Devoid: Face of the Enemy is a 1996 FMV-based tech noir graphic adventure game developed by Electric Dreams Inc. and released by Mindscape for MS-DOS and Mac OS. A Japanese language version of the game was released under the title DeathMask for Sega Saturn and PlayStation.

This first-person video game is set in a dark, futuristic cyberpunk-influenced world. Most of the characters that can be interacted with are played by live video game actors superimposed over a digital scenery; the cast includes Joseph Pilato and Eric Anderson. The player character is a police detective, who wears the face of an infamous criminal terrorist named Angel Devoid. Wandering around the fictional Neo-City, the player meets Devoid's acquaintances and has to survive against death hazards, including Devoid's past adversaries.

== Synopsis ==
=== Setting ===
In the future explained in the game documentation, humanity has suffered from floods due to the melting of polar ice caps. An emergency coalition known as the Aggregate World Government has begun the Colonization of Mars for resources. Meanwhile, the United States of America emerged once more as a superpower, spearheading in science and technology; the sudden influx of wealth resulted to inflation and catastrophic bank failures, and the outlawing of credit-based economy. Humanity also had developed the technology of human cloning for purposes like the creation of genetically engineered soldiers for the Death Companies of the Martian colony, but abuse of the technology, including morally questionable use of the clones, resulted to the criminalisation of the technology and the establishment of DNA Laws. A prominent company mentioned in the game manual and the game dialogues is "Feradyne Corporation", which switched to robotics after the laws were passed.

The game is set in or around March 3032, and in the aftermath of the Martian Conflict, which started when the Martian colonists wished for independence and started an embargo. The Lunar Project Conglomerate, to preserve the interests of the Moon colonists, responded with sending a robotic army against the rebels, who eventually were forced to flee to Earth. Most were forced to surrender and be tried, as they were suffering from reactive arthritis, a disease released from biological weapons during the conflict, and the required Egesis IV drug was legally administered only from the Terran government.

Angel Devoid, a commando genetically engineered by Feradyne who led the Martian resistance, was court-martialed along with other rebels. Acquitted on all charges, he worked his way to the position of Chief of Paradise City Police Department. During his service his office was rigged with a bomb, which severely injured Detective Jake Hard, who underwent heavy reconstruction and lost some of his memory. Devoid was the alleged perpetrator and Hard held him responsible for his damage, although Devoid himself accused Mayor James Waterford for wanting to get rid of him. Eventually Devoid was forced to resign for an alleged police brutality scandal, and during the relevant press-conference he assassinated the Mayor. After threatening those who wanted to get rid of him, he disappeared in the underground of the Neo-City where he became a notorious criminal, performing terrorist acts against corporations involved in the Mars conflict.

=== Plot ===
As the game starts, the player character Jake Hard is pursuing his archnemesis Angel Devoid who has been spotted near Neo-City, until his flying patrol car is damaged and himself falls severely injured. He wakes up in a hospital after having had a facial reconstruction surgery, only to find himself having the face of Angel Devoid, and unable to speak as his vocal cords are damaged. His first task is to escape the hospital before the Police arrives. Early in the beginning, he meets his ex-colleague Lorraine Ruger, who has been blinded and recognises Hard from his gait, and supplies him with a Plasma Pistol.

The player travels around regions of Neo-City, meets several characters who pass him for Devoid, but also tries to survive as his archnemesis is wanted by bounty hunters, a figure only referred to as "the Yak", and the "Death Tribes" (underground groups whose members maintain neotribalistic customs in the urban scenery). As many of the characters are hostile, the player occasionally has to resolve to quickly using the pistol against them to avoid the game over. As the game progresses, the player obtains wetware computer chips belonging to Devoid; he learns that he was involved in the theft of a highly explosive material known as Trixilite, which he has linked to the thermo-furnaces of Paradise City, intending to destroy both cities.

In the end, the player accesses an underground complex where he meets the original Angel Devoid inside a life support device. It is revealed that Angel Devoid employed clones for his deeds, and the player is actually the last of them, leaving open to interpretation how much of the protagonist's backstory is true. The player then is faced with several choices that will trigger three alternate endings; these range from either killing Devoid and being hailed as a hero while the citizens continue to live their own dystopia; to escaping on a space shuttle before the cities explode, and seek a new life on Mars.

== Gameplay ==
Angel Devoid is played like other first-person point-and-click adventure games of the era. The gameplay has been compared to that of The 11th Hour. The graphics window displays what the player character is supposed to see. The mouse cursor changes into arrows showing wherever the protagonist can head to, followed by a brief animation of the environment "passing by" as the character walks towards a direction. The cursor also is used to interact with some objects. An option on the interface allows the player to examine an object, although the cases this can be done are very few.

A small interface at the bottom provides some options, such as the inventory with the items the protagonist has collected, typically the weapon and several access cards. There is also an interface which gives access to the in-game I-Net database with background information on the characters the player has met. Whenever the player interacts with a character, there are three attitudes available towards him, represented by three human skulls, from demonic (intimidating, aggressive) to neutral to angelic (friendly, polite). Each case demands its own attitude, as some characters would be cooperative only to one. The player can encounter fatalities which directly result in death and the end of the game. Uncommon for an adventure game, there is also a health bar with three points representing the minor fatalities the player can suffer in some cases during the whole duration of the game; such as touching a rotating ventilation fan. Losing all three of them also results in a game over.

== Development ==
Angel Devoid takes place in a 3d pre-rendered environment which features live-action actors and footage, both during cinematic cutscenes and sometimes within the virtual environments. Angel Devoid was made when such games were at the peak of their popularity. Actor Joseph Pilato portrays Mayor Waterford during the flashback scene of the assassination by Angel Devoid, and also a semi-demented Neurologist at the Neo-City Clinic. Interaction with the characters consists of lengthy monologues by the actors, as the game character is actually a silent protagonist; a technique used to allow the players to immerse themselves better in the position of the character. Like in other games of the era, the videos are interlaced to employ the SVGA capabilities. The dark "neo-gothic" visual aesthetics of the game have been likened tο Ridley Scott's Blade Runner.

== Reception ==
Reception

Aggregate score
Aggregator	Score
GameRankings	55%

Review scores
Publication	Score
GameSpot	6.7/10
Entertainment Weekly	B−
Coming Soon Magazine	85%
Computer Game Review	79/81/77

Angel Devoid received mostly mixed reviews. It holds an aggregated 55% score on GameRankings, based on reviews from various professional critics. In a contemporary review, GameSpot praised the game for its striking visuals and atmosphere, which compensated for its poor scriptwriting and live action performances. Entertainment Weekly noted that Angel Devoid suffered from the usual inadequacies of interactive movie-based games featuring live actors, that is lacking "a good script and ... a sense of humor".

Coming Soon Magazine received the game more positively. Noting it was the first venture of Mindscape into the adventure genre, the reviewer acknowledged the game as "a decisive step in the right direction" and praised its "spectacular graphics" and "well-conceived scenario"; despite several imperfections, like the limited interaction and small duration.
