= Mimesis: Night of the Living Dead =

- Film poster
- Directed by: Douglas Schulze
- Screenplay by: Joshua Wagner; Douglas Schulze
- Story by: Douglas Schulze
- Produced by: Kurt Eli Mayry; Douglas Schulze; Gavin Grazer
- Starring: Allen Maldonado; Lauren Mae Shafer; Taylor Piedmonte; David G.B. Brown; Courtney Gains; Sid Haig
- Cinematography: Lon Stratton
- Edited by: Rob Frenette
- Music by: Diego Navarro
- Production companies: Dead Wait Productions; MPI Films
- Distributed by: Anchor Bay Entertainment
- Release date: October 7, 2011 (Blue Water Film Festival)
- Running time: 95 minutes
- Country: United States
- Language: English

Mimesis: Night of the Living Dead (also Mimesis) is a 2011 American horror film directed by Douglas Schulze, written by Joshua Wagner and Schulze, and starring Allen Maldonado, Lauren Mae Shafer, Taylor Piedmonte, and David G.B. Brown.

== Plot ==
A farmer and his wife are attacked in their remote home by what appear to be zombies. At a horror convention, filmmaker Alfonso Betz is onstage discussing media being blamed for real-life violence. Russell and Duane listen in the audience, but Duane is disinterested and talks over the speaker. In the cafeteria later, Russell and Duane are invited to a private party by a seductive goth girl.

Russell and Duane go to a secluded farmhouse for the party, along with other horror fans. The partyers drink keg beer and get to know each other before seemingly passing out.

Russell awakes with a girl named Karen in a cemetery, now dressed as two leads from “Night of the Living Dead” and without a memory of how they got there. A zombie approaches and bites Russell’s throat while Karen runs away. She finds Duane, who has just awoken inside of a truck. She takes refuge in the farmhouse and tells Duane what happened. Disbelieving, Duane looks for Russell and then carries him back to the farmhouse after seeing the zombie. Karen hears voices coming from a vent leading to the house’s basement. Duane explores the top floor and finds a room where all modern technology has been stored. The rest of the house has been made to look like the 1960s. Duane also finds the dead bodies of the farmer and his wife.

Duane decides to take Russell to a hospital in the truck but retreats to the house when three zombies approach. Duane has to leave Russell outside and the zombies tear him apart.

In the basement, Duane finds Karl with his wife and daughter, as well as Keith and Judith. The group discuss their situation and what to do next. Keith points out that they are unwitting participants in a recreation of “Night of the Living Dead.”

The original movie plays on an old television set in one of the rooms. Karl wants to take the truck and escape but the group overrule him. Duane sneaks out from a top floor window and makes a run to the shed out back for tools. He kills one of the zombies by stabbing garden shears into its throat. Duane returns to the house. Keith adds that it is a good thing that Karl did not take the truck because it blows up in the movie.

Karl sneaks outside to hotwire the truck anyway. The rest of the group scream for him to stop but he blows himself up.

Zombies enter the home. Most of the survivors retreat to the basement. A female zombie bites the leg of Karl’s wife before Keith stabs her through the back with the shears. Keith puts a pitchfork through the face of a clown zombie. Duane wrestles with another zombie before Keith chases him upstairs.

Upstairs, Keith finds another survivor named Owen. Duane believes he is out of place because he is not a character from the movie. Owen reveals that he was one of the zombies but had a change of heart. The zombies are actually psychopaths that are playing a role-playing game to live out a horror movie instead of simply watching it. They are using metal teeth to bite their victims. A zombie surprises them and kills Owen while the others escape.

In the basement, Keith and Duane pull a necklace off the clown zombie’s corpse and realize Judith has the same necklace. She says that she did not know what was going to happen. She was only paid to lure people to the party. Keith throws her outside where the zombies chase her.

Duane thinks Judith should be rescued. Keith objects and the two of them fight. Karen smashes the TV so that they will stop. Duane goes after Judith.

Judith hides in a car but two zombies capture her. She is brought to a basement where Alfonso Betz is also a prisoner. The zombies plan to stage a murder-suicide so that the film director will be blamed for the massacre as if he broke from reality and went insane. Betz rails against his captors before the lead zombie shoots him through the head.

Keith goes upstairs to retrieve the shears from a zombie’s body. He finds a cell phone on the body with footage of his girlfriend seen at the party being murdered. Another zombie records him as Keith squats over the body. Owen is still alive and grabs Keith. Another zombie comes and stabs Keith while streaming it on his phone to the other zombies. The lead zombie complains that the behavior is inconsistent with a Romero zombie.

Duane makes it to the basement and kills the zombie who was about to put an axe into Judith. The two remaining zombies go to the farmhouse. Karen tries to pitchfork one of them but the tool is wrestled away from her. While attacking the little girl, the mother puts a tool through the head of one zombie. Karen points a gun at the other zombie as Duane and Judith reenter. The lead zombie gives an unremorseful speech before Judith approaches him with a kiss and then uses her metal teeth to bite his throat. Duane then shoots him. A news interview with a police officer wraps up the events.

== Cast ==
- Allen Maldonado as Duane
- Lauren Mae Shafer as Judith
- Taylor Piedmonte as Russell
- David G.B. Brown as Keith
- Jana Grazer as Karen
- Gavin Grazer as Karl
- Courtney Gains as Gordon
- Sid Haig as Alfonso Betz

== Production ==
Director Douglas Shulze conceived the idea for the film after attending horror conventions and seeing costumed fans who took their in-character roleplaying too far. The film is not meant as a remake; instead, Schulze wanted to address themes of obsessed fans.

== Release ==
Mimesis: Night of the Living Dead premiered at the Blue Water Film Festival on October 7, 2011. Sid Haig attended the event.

Anchor Bay Entertainment released it on home video on February 12, 2013.

== Reception ==
Dennis Harvey of Variety wrote that the film is "just sporadically scary, yet the plot's twists and turns keep viewers hooked." Rod Lott of the Oklahoma Gazette called it a pointless, shoddy remake of Night of the Living Dead. Steve Barton of Dread Central rated it 3/5 stars and called it "a movie with an excellent premise that's executed in the most standard of ways." Adam Tyner of DVD Talk rated it 3/5 stars and called it "an uneven but surprisingly effective homage". Patrick Naugle of DVD Verdict called it "a movie with a semi-interesting plot but uninspired execution."
