= Night of the Living Dead: Darkest Dawn =

- Theatrical poster
- Directed by: Krisztian Majdik; Zebediah De Soto
- Written by: Zebediah De Soto; David R. Schwartz
- Produced by: Simon West; Jib Polhemus; Gus Malliarodakis
- Starring: Tony Todd; Danielle Harris; Bill Moseley; R. Madhavan; Joseph Pilato; Sydney Tamiia Poitier; Alona Tal; Tom Sizemore
- Cinematography: Gabriel Sabloff
- Edited by: Krisztian Majdik
- Music by: Jermaine Stegall
- Release date: July 11, 2015; (Walker Stalker Fan Fest)
- Country: United States
- Language: English

Night of the Living Dead: Darkest Dawn, also known as Night of the Living Dead: Origins and Night of the Living Dead: Origins 3D, is a 2015 animated horror film directed by Krisztian Majdik and Zebediah De Soto and produced by Simon West. The film is a re-telling of the original Night of the Living Dead in a contemporary setting.

== Premise ==
An animated re-telling of the original Night of the Living Dead film. Set in modern-day New York City rather than 1960s rural Pennsylvania. Centers on a group of desperate survivors fighting to stay alive barricaded in an abandoned apartment building. Confined, cut off from the world, and under constant attack from the undead hordes closing in around them, the six main characters struggle to survive while also confronting their own sense of compassion and humanity.

== Cast ==
- Tony Todd as Ben
- Danielle Harris as Barbara Todd
- Bill Moseley as Johnny Todd
- R. Madhavan as Tom Bitner
- Joseph Pilato as Harry Cooper
- Sydney Tamiia Poitier as Tami
- Alona Tal as Helen Cooper
- Tom Sizemore as Chief McClellan
- Sarah Habel as Judy Rose Larson
- Jesse Corti as News Reporter
- Anastasia Roark as Susan Donaldson
- Cornell Womack as Hunter Deets
- Erin Braswell as Judy
- Mike Diskint as Tom
- Tech N9ne as Zombie

== Production ==
The film had been in production on and off for five years since 2009. According to Tony Todd, the film had two different directors with two different approaches at different points in time. The film features visual effects from The Graphic Film Company, Los Angeles, which relied on the iPi Soft iPi Motion Capture markerless motion capture software. The software’s ability allows the filmmakers to produce very large amounts of moving zombies on screen and also allows the actors to motion capture their performances as if they were acting on a real film set.

Mos Def was originally cast as a voice actor, but after a short time, he was released from the project. Both Todd and Moseley would be reprising their roles as Ben and Johnny, respectively, from the 1990 version of the film. Indian actor R. Madhavan was signed on to play a role in mid 2013.

== Release and reception ==
The film was reported to be complete in May 2014. A theatrical release across the United States of America was planned in the fall of 2014. However this did not happen. The film later premiered at 2015 Comic Con held in San Diego as a part of the Walker Stalker Fan Fest, during July 2015. The film was later released in October 2015 on iTunes and OnDemand stations across the United States.

To date there has been only one review collected by Rotten Tomatoes.
