= Night of the Living Dead 3D =

- Poster art
- Directed by: Jeff Broadstreet
- Screenplay by: Robert Valding
- Based on: Night of the Living Dead by George A. Romero; John A. Russo
- Produced by: Jeff Broadstreet
- Starring: Brianna Brown; Joshua Desroches; Johanna Black; Greg Travis; Sid Haig
- Cinematography: Andrew Parke
- Edited by: Robert Valding
- Music by: Jason Brandt
- Distributed by: Lux Digital Pictures
- Release date: November 10, 2006
- Running time: 80 minutes
- Country: United States
- Language: English
- Budget: $750,000
- Box office: $1,553,837

Night of the Living Dead 3D or Night of the Living DE3D is a 2006 horror film made in 3D. It is the second remake of the 1968 horror film Night of the Living Dead. The first remake was released in 1990 and was directed by Tom Savini from a revised screenplay by George A. Romero. Unlike the first remake, no one involved with the original is involved with this version. The original film was never properly copyrighted, and so it has fallen into the public domain, making this remake possible with no permission from the original's creators (the original movie can actually be seen playing on TV in this version).

It was released on DVD on October 9, 2007, in two separate versions, the original 3D format which includes four pairs of anaglyph (red/blue) 3D glasses, and a 2D version that does not require nor include any 3D glasses.

== Plot ==
In this latest interpretation, the characters Barb and her brother Johnny arrive late for their aunt's funeral and find the cemetery overrun with zombies. After Johnny abandons her, Barb flees the cemetery and is rescued by Ben, a local college student. The two seek refuge in the nearby farmhouse of the Cooper family (Henry and Hellie Cooper, Henry's daughter and Hellie's stepdaughter Karen, farmhand Owen, and farmhand Tom and his girlfriend Judy), and attempt to live through the night along with other survivors, including the pyrophobic mortician, Gerald Tovar Jr.

As Barb and Ben attempt to convince the Cooper family that the zombies are heading to the house, Tom and Judy are attacked while having sex in the barn. After hearing Judy's screams, Barb and the rest of the household attempt to save her, but they are too late. After recovering Henry's guns from his safe, they begin to look for a missing Karen, she is later found by her mother as an undead. Henry blocks Ben from shooting her, but Karen bites her father in the neck and is promptly shot by Ben. Tovar arrives fighting through the dead with a shovel.

Owen finally succumbs to a zombie bite and becomes undead. While attempting to eat Ben, Owen is killed by Tovar. Barb and Ben leave with Tovar to what they believe is safety, while Henry and Hellie barricade themselves upstairs. Distraught over the death of their child and the impending reanimation of Henry, they decide to commit suicide.

After reaching his car, Tovar knocks Ben out and loads him into the trunk of his car. He chases Barb back to his house and reveals that he was the one who brought the dead back to life, even so much as bringing his own father back and feeding him with his own blood. Barb sets the reanimated corpse of Tovar's father on fire, with Tovar unable to prevent his father from getting consumed. Barb flees to Tovar's car, but Tovar catches her, knocks her out, and brings her back to the mortuary along with Ben. Ultimately, Tovar plans to have Barb reborn as a zombie, but while handling Barb, Tovar doesn't notice a group of zombies behind him; Barb shoves him into them and rushes back to the car, where she locks herself inside until Ben retrieves her.

Barb and Ben escape and lock the other zombies in the garage. Ben realizes that he has been impaled by a tire iron, but is apparently unharmed; moments later, he transforms into a zombie. Barb uses her last bullet to kill him, just before the zombies break through the gate and encroach on her.

== Cast ==
- Brianna Brown as Barb
- Joshua DesRoces as Ben
- Sid Haig as Gerald Tovar Jr.
- Greg Travis as Henry Cooper
- Johanna Black as Hellie Cooper
- Adam Chambers as Owen
- Ken Ward as Johnny
- Alynia Phillips as Karen Cooper
- Max Williams as Tom
- Cristin Michele as Judy

== Critical reception ==
The film received poor reviews with Rotten Tomatoes showing an 18% rating and Metacritic describing reviews as "generally unfavorable." Justin Chang of Variety said the film "feels like a cynical attempt to cash in on a classic." Steve Barton of Dread Central said of the film "Failing as both a homage and a gimmick, Night of the Living Dead 3D only succeeds in taking us to new dimensions of boredom" and gave it one and a half stars.

== Prequel ==
A prequel, titled Night of the Living Dead 3D: Re-Animation, was released in 2012 starring Andrew Divoff, Jeffrey Combs, Denice Duff and directed by Jeff Broadstreet.

== Soundtrack ==
The end credits theme is entitled Control which is part of Radford's album Sleepwalker which was released in 2004.
