= How the Garcia Girls Spent Their Summer =

- America Ferrera as Blanca Garcia
- Directed by: Georgina Riedel & Rudi Berden
- Written by: Georgina Riedel
- Starring: Elizabeth Peña; America Ferrera; Lucy Gallardo
- Cinematography: Tobias Datum
- Edited by: Sean Olson
- Distributed by: Maya Entertainment
- Release date: June 8, 2005
- Running time: 128 minutes
- Country: United States
- Languages: English; Spanish

How the Garcia Girls Spent Their Summer is a 2005 American comedy film starring Elizabeth Peña. It was released on DVD June 8, 2008. The film won the Silver George for the Best Film of the Perspective competition at the 27th Moscow International Film Festival.

== Premise ==
The plot concerns three generations of Garcia women in a sleepy Arizona town who experience an awakening during the course of a summer: teenaged Blanca Garcia; her mother, Lolita; and her grandmother, Doña.

Doña, the matriarch of the family, decides to buy a car but doesn't know how to drive. Her gardener, a man named Don Pedro offers to teach her, and the relationship gradually turns from platonic to romantic. Meanwhile, Doña's daughter, Lolita, is torn between her co-worker at the butcher shop where she works and Victor, a married man who frequently makes passes at women around town. Seventeen-year-old Blanca falls for the new guy in town and learns about the joy and pain an intimate relationship can bring.

Throughout the story, the women struggle to sort out their feelings while trying not to further damage their sometimes strained family relationship. Most of the dialogue is in English, with occasional humorous digressions of old men sitting around talking in Spanish about their past experiences with cars and women.

== Cast ==
- Elizabeth Peña as Lolita
- America Ferrera as Blanca Garcia
- Lucy Gallardo as Doña Genoveva
- Eliana Alexander as Nora
- Victor Wolf as Oswaldo
- David Barrera as Sal's Uncle
- Steven Bauer as Victor Reyes
- Alek Carrera as Soap Opera Actor
- Ana Cervantes as Doña Loda
- Jorge Cervera Jr. as Don Pedro
- Patricia de Leon as Soap Opera Actress
- Marina Dena-Santo as Cuka
- Alyssa Diaz as Rose
- Ricki Lopez as Father Miguel
- Leo Minaya as Sal
- Alberto Montero as Freddie
- Ruben Moreno as Old Man
- Rick Najera as Jose Luis
- Marina Dena Santo as Cucka
- Jane Sevilla as Carla
- Perla Walters as Nena

== Reception ==
On the review aggregator website Rotten Tomatoes, 79% of 29 critics' reviews are positive. The website's consensus reads: "At turns comical and sincere, Garcia Girls is an intelligent and intimate portrait of three women finding love at different ages."
