= Joseph Pilato =

American actor (1949–2019)

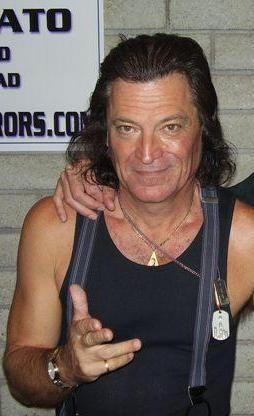
- Pilato in 2008
- Born: Josef Francis Anthony Pilato Jr. March 16, 1949; Fitchburg, Massachusetts, U.S.
- Died: March 24, 2019 (aged 70); Los Angeles, California, U.S.
- Other names: Joe Palato; Josef Piato; Joe Pilato; Josef Pilato; Joseph F. Pilato; Joe Pilot; Joseph Rhodes; Joey Pal
- Occupation: Actor
- Years active: 1978–2019
- Children: 1

Josef Francis Anthony Pilato Jr. (March 16, 1949 – March 24, 2019) was an American film and voice actor. He was perhaps best known for his performance as Captain Henry Rhodes in the post-apocalyptic zombie horror film Day of the Dead (1985).

== Early life ==
Josef Francis Anthony Pilato Jr. was born on March 16, 1949, in Fitchburg, Massachusetts to an Italian-American family. His father was a professional trombonist with the Les Brown Orchestra. Joseph was enrolled into Catholic school and became an altar boy, where his talent for acting was developed.

== Career ==
=== Day of the Dead and success ===
In 1984, six years after the release of Dawn of the Dead (1978), director George A. Romero was planning a new zombie film called Day of the Dead (1985). Pilato had appeared as a cameo in Dawn of the Dead as a police officer, which had been his first feature film role. Pilato was selected to play United States Army Captain Henry Rhodes. He was best known for this performance, and the film, along with its predecessors, have become classics.

=== Later career and other projects ===
Pilato later voiced Vexor in Big Bad Beetleborgs under the alias of "Joey Pal" and worked in the English dub of Digimon Adventure and Digimon Adventure 02 voicing MetalGreymon. He would later land minor roles in such films as Pulp Fiction (1994), Wishmaster (1997), Digimon: The Movie (2000), and Night of the Living Dead: Darkest Dawn (2015).

== Personal life ==
Joseph Pilato had one daughter, Gianna Pilato, who was born in 1994.

== Death ==
Joseph Pilato died in his sleep on March 24, 2019, eight days after his 70th birthday. Day of the Dead co-star Lori Cardille cited alcoholism as contributing to his death.

== Filmography ==
=== Television and film ===
Year	Title	Role	Notes
1978	Dawn of the Dead	Officer at Police Dock	
1980	Effects	Dominic	
1981	Knightriders	Disgruntled Fair Worker	
1985	Day of the Dead	Captain Henry Rhodes	
1986	Gung Ho	Union Member	
1989	Shooters	Sergeant Plato	
1990	Alienator	Tech #2	
1990	Empire of the Dark	Guy Zupan	
1993	The Evil Inside Me	Fulvio	
1994	Pulp Fiction	Dean Martin Impersonator	Credited as "Josef Pilato"
1994	Married People, Single Sex	Artie	
1994	Witch Hunt		Uncredited role
1995	The Demolitionist	"Boxer"	Credited as "Josef Pilato"
1996	Visions	NSA Agent	
1996	Neon Signs	Boto	
1996	Big Bad Beetleborgs	Vexor (voice)	Credited as "Joey Pal"
1997	Wishmaster	Mickey Torreli	
1998	Music from Another Room	Carlo	
1999	The Last Seduction II	Marvin Dishman	
1999	Digimon Adventure	MetalGreymon (voice: English dub)	Recurring role
2000	Digimon: The Movie	MetalGreymon (voice: English dub)	
2000	Digimon Adventure 02	MetalGreymon (voice: English dub)	Recurring role
2003	The Ghouls		Uncredited role
2009	Someone's Knocking at the Door	Dr. Ottie	
2010	Underground Entertainment: The Movie	Himself	
2014	9am	Bernie	Short
2014	Shhhh	"Red" Harling	
2015	Night of the Living Dead: Darkest Dawn	Harry Cooper (voice)	
2016	Ilhailed		
2016	Parasites	Wilde	
2016	The Chair	Security Guard	
2018	Attack in LA	Wilde	Final film role

=== Video games ===
Year	Title	Role
1995	WarHawk: The Red Mercury Missions	Kreel
1996	Angel Devoid: Face of the Enemy	Dr. Garnett / Mayor Waterford
1997	Star Trek: Starfleet Academy	Emdervoss / Klingon Spokesman
2002	Might and Magic IX	Additional voices
2003	Lords of EverQuest	Additional voices
