= Honda XL350R =

- Manufacturer: Honda
- Production: 1984–1985
- Engine: 340 cc (21 cu in), air-cooled, SOHC, 4-stroke, single-cylinder
- Bore / stroke: 84.0 mm × 61.3 mm (3.31 in × 2.41 in)
- Compression ratio: 9.5:1
- Top speed: 134 km/h (83 mph)
- Power: 22 kW (30 bhp) 7,500 rpm (claimed)
- Torque: 28.3 N⋅m (20.9 lb⋅ft) 6,500 rpm (claimed)
- Transmission: Multi-plate, wet clutch, 6-speed, chain
- Suspension: Showa, Front: 39mm telescopic fork, 230 mm (9.1 in) travel, adjustable air pressure Rear: Single shock, 220 mm (8.6 in) travel, adjustable rebound, preload
- Brakes: Front single 240 mm (9.4 in) disc, Rear 110 mm (4.3 in) drum
- Tires: Yokohama, Front: 3.00×21; Rear: 4.60×17
- Rake, trail: 30.5°, 120 mm (4.7 in)
- Wheelbase: 1,410 mm (55.6 in)
- Dimensions: W: 800 mm (31.5 in)
- Seat height: 860 mm (33.9 in)
- Weight: 137 kg (301 lb) (wet)
- Fuel capacity: 11 L; 2.4 imp gal (2.9 US gal)
- Fuel consumption: 4.9 L/100 km; 58 mpg_{‑imp} (48 mpg_{‑US})

The Honda XL350R is a dual-sport motorcycle made by Honda in 1984–1985. Both Cycle World and Cycle ranked it as one of the ten best motorcycles of 1985. Cycle World tested the 0.00 to 0.40 km (0 to 1/4 mi) time at 15.42 seconds @ 131.19 km/h (81.52 mph), with a top speed of 134 km/h (83 mph), and the braking performance at 60 to 0 mph (97 to 0 km/h) in 40 m (130 ft).

== Specifications ==
The engine is an air cooled single cylinder, four-stroke with a displacement of 340.00 ccm (20.75 cubic inches) making 27.00 HP (19.7 kW)) @ 7500 RPM. Its top speed is 134.0 km/h (83.3 mph). It uses a 6-speed gearbox. The front brakes are single disc and with rear drum brakes.
