= Paul Garson =

American writer and photographer (born 1946)

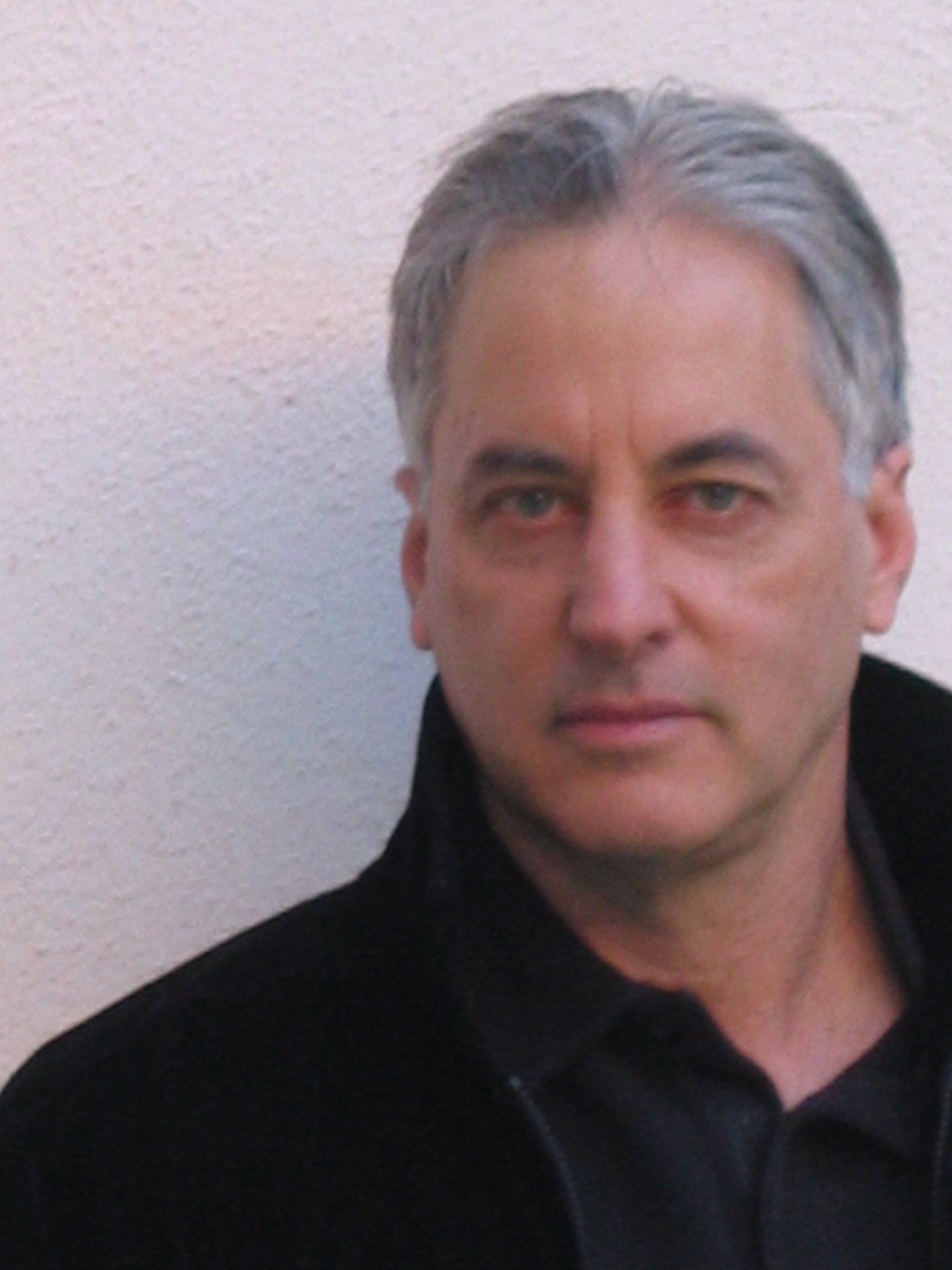
- Paul Garson
- Born: March 7, 1946 (age 80); Washington, D.C., U.S.
- Education: Tulane University; Johns Hopkins University; University of Southern California
- Occupations: Writer, photographer
- Notable work: The Great Quill; Born to Be Wild; Album of the Damned: Snapshots from the Third Reich; New Images of Nazi Germany: A Photographic Collection

Paul Garson (born March 7, 1946) is an American writer and photographer. He has contributed to many magazines and periodicals, and has published both fiction and nonfiction books as well as written two screenplays that have been produced. He served as a university instructor of composition and writing, as well as a martial arts instructor. His public relations and marketing projects included several for national and multinational companies.

== Biography ==
Garson was born in Washington, D.C., and spent his formative years in West Palm Beach, Florida. He then attended undergraduate school at Tulane University followed by graduate degrees at Johns Hopkins University and at USC, where he also served as an instructor. Garson has traveled to 25 countries include Russia, Japan and Turkey. His martial arts training in traditional Japanese karate began in 1967, and continued as a student of Sensei Hidetaka Nishiyama at the National Karate Institute in Los Angeles, where he earned his YonDan (4th degree black belt). His martial arts training included instruction under Sensei Robert Bryner in Ryu-te and Aikido.

== Career ==
Garson started writing from an early age. In 1973, he wrote and had published his first novel, a science fiction work titled The Great Quill, which was published by Doubleday. Several years followed as a high school teacher and freelance writer, as well as an editor at several publishing companies including Peterson Publishing, McMullen Publishing and Paisano Publications. In 2005, he published Born to Be Wild, which cataloged the history of the motorcycle. He has authored over 2,000 articles for various automotive, motorcycle and lifestyle magazines, as well as other genres including World War II history. His nonfiction book, Album of the Damned: Snapshots from the Third Reich, was published in October 2008 by Academy Chicago Publishers. Favorable reviews appeared in the New York Post, Chicago Tribune, Penthouse magazine and other periodicals.

His most recent book, continuing his research into the era of World War II, was published in October 2012 by McFarland & Co. "New Images of Nazi Germany-A Photographic Collection" focuses on the impact of the camera on imagery and ideology during the Third Reich. It presents over 400 original and never before published photos while the text traces their historical context, often touching on little explored areas. The book is available in print and eBook form.

A new work titled "Mayhem in Miniature: Tales Told Through Toy Soldiers" is nearing completion. Focusing on the history of World War I and World War II era toy soldiers it includes details photography of some 400 examples produced in the U.S., Britain, Germany, Italy, France and Japan. Juxtaposed with the figures are original, never before published photos that place the toy soldiers within the historical context of the wars.

He currently lives and writes in Los Angeles. He has a son, Grant Nathaniel Garson. Along with Christian Lukather, he co-founded the literary website, The Writing Disorder.
