= Jeff Broadstreet =

American film director

- Born: November 7, 1960 (age 65); Greencastle, Indiana, United States
- Occupations: Film director, screenwriter, film producer

Jeff Broadstreet (born November 7, 1960) is an American film director.

Broadstreet directed the 2006 remake of Night of the Living Dead (1968), titled Night of the Living Dead 3D and its prequel, Night of the Living Dead 3D: Re-Animation.

Broadstreet has also directed the films Sexbomb (1989) and Dr. Rage (2005). He was also executive producer on the 2010 documentary American Grindhouse.
