= American Grindhouse =

- Directed by: Elijah Drenner
- Written by: Elijah Drenner; Calum Waddell
- Produced by: Elijah Drenner
- Narrated by: Robert Forster
- Cinematography: Dan Greene
- Edited by: Elijah Drenner; Andrew Goldenberg; Dan Greene
- Music by: Jason Brandt
- Production companies: Lux Digital Pictures; End Films
- Distributed by: Lorber Films
- Release date: March 13, 2010 (SXSW)
- Running time: 80 minutes
- Country: United States
- Language: English

American Grindhouse is a 2010 documentary directed and produced by Elijah Drenner. The film made its world premiere at the South by Southwest film festival in Austin, Texas on March 13, 2010.

== Overview ==
The documentary chronicles the history of the American exploitation film from the days of Thomas Edison to contemporary films of the 21st century. The film features interviews with John Landis, Joe Dante, Jack Hill, Don Edmonds, Fred Williamson, Allison Anders, James Gordon White, Larry Cohen, William Lustig, Herschell Gordon Lewis, Judy Brown, Jeremy Kasten, Jonathan Kaplan, Bob Minor, Lewis Teague, David Hess and Fred Olen Ray. The documentary also features film historians Eddie Muller, Kim Morgan and Eric Schaefer. Robert Forster narrates.

== Films referenced ==
Many film titles and posters get shown in passing, but this is a list of the films that are commented on or analyzed in the voiceover or by the interviewees. The list is in chronological order, but some of the films are mentioned in the documentary out of that sequence to fit with the themes.

The main films referenced in the documentary are:

- The Great Train Robbery (1903)
- Traffic in Souls (1913)
- Dracula (1931)
- Frankenstein (1931)
- Freaks (1932)
- Maniac (1934)
- You Can't Beat the Rap! (1936)
- I Wake Up Screaming (1941)
- Mom and Dad (1945)
- Because of Eve (1948)
- Creature from the Black Lagoon (1954)
- Blackboard Jungle (1955)
- I Was a Teenage Werewolf (1957)
- The Tingler (1959)
- The Immoral Mr. Teas (1959)
- Psycho (1960)
- Scum of the Earth! (1963)
- Blood Feast (1963)
- Two Thousand Maniacs! (1964)
- Olga's House of Shame (1964)
- The Wild Angels (1966)
- Lord Love a Duck (1966)
- The Lusting Hours (1967)
- The Trip (1967)
- She-Devils on Wheels (1968)
- Easy Rider (1969)
- Midnight Cowboy (1969)
- Sweet Sweetback's Baadasssss Song (1971)
- The Corpse Grinders (1971)
- The Incredible 2-Headed Transplant (1971)
- The Tormentors (1971)
- The Big Doll House (1971)
- The Big Bird Cage (1972)
- The Last House on the Left (1972)
- Night of the Lepus (1972)
- Deep Throat (1972)
- Schlock (1973)
- Black Caesar (1973)
- Coffy (1973)
- Truck Turner (1974)
- Ilsa, She Wolf of the SS (1975)
- Jaws (1975)
- Eaten Alive (1977)
- Piranha (1978)
- Alligator (1980)
- The Passion of the Christ (2004)
- Hostel (2005)
- Grindhouse (2007)
- American Gangster (2007)
- Hell Ride (2008)
- Black Dynamite (2009)

== Reception ==
The film earned positive reviews from critics, with some like The Village Voice's Mark Holcomb saying "nitpicky enough to please film-history nerds but lively in a way that should tickle the merely curious".

On the review aggregator website Rotten Tomatoes, 75% of eight critics' reviews are positive, with an average rating of 6.3/10.

== See also ==
- Not Quite Hollywood: The Wild, Untold Story of Ozploitation!, a 2008 documentary about Australian exploitation (better known as Ozploitation) films by Mark Hartley
- B movie
- Roger Corman
