= Million Dollar Mystery =

1987 film directed by Richard Fleischer

- Theatrical release poster
- Directed by: Richard Fleischer
- Written by: Rudy De Luca; Tim Metcalfe; Miguel Tejada-Flores
- Produced by: Stephen F. Kesten
- Starring: Tom Bosley
- Cinematography: Jack Cardiff
- Edited by: John W. Wheeler
- Music by: Al Gorgoni; James House
- Distributed by: De Laurentiis Entertainment Group
- Release date: June 12, 1987
- Running time: 95 minutes
- Country: United States
- Language: English
- Budget: $10 million
- Box office: $989,033

Million Dollar Mystery (also known as Money Mania) is a 1987 American film released with a promotional tie-in for Glad-Lock brand bags. This was the final feature-length film directed by Richard Fleischer and shot by Jack Cardiff.

It starred an ensemble cast of "America's new comic talent", including Royce D. Applegate, Eddie Deezen, Rick Overton, Rich Hall, Pam Matteson, Peter Pitofsky, Greg Travis, Mack Dryden, Jamie Alcroft, and Kevin Pollak. The film was largely inspired by Stanley Kramer's 1963 screwball comedy film It's a Mad, Mad, Mad, Mad World.

Dar Robinson, a stuntman, died on November 21, 1986, after riding his motorcycle off a cliff while attempting to do a stunt during the production of the movie.

== Plot ==
Sidney Preston, a disgruntled White House aide, takes off with $4 million that belonged to the government. While on the run, he stops at a roadside diner in Arizona and has their world-famous chili, while flirting with the waitress. Two clumsy government spies named Fred and Bob are looking for Sidney. Sidney suffers a fatal heart attack and before dying asks for a kiss from the waitress Dotty, then he reveals to the onlookers the location of the first million dollars which he says is "In the city of the bridge". The onlookers are the Briggs Family (Stuart, Barbara, and Howie), nerdy newlyweds Rollie and Lollie, amateur singer Crush and his group of three blonde backup dancers (Faith, Hope, and Charity), cook Tugger and his sister Dotty. Soon, they meet professional wrestlers Bad Boris and Awful Abdul, cops Officer Gretchen and Officer Quinn, and deranged ranger Slaughter Buzzard.

The onlookers are skeptical, until Rollie turns on the television which is playing the news talking about Sidney Preston and the buried money. The newsman talks about his life and says he was born in El Puente, Arizona. The onlookers of the diner head out on a mad dash to find the dough. When they find the money in El Puente's famous bridge, Slaughter accidentally drops it into the canyon. They follow clues to the next million which is in Sidney's houseboat and lose it as well as it gets shredded in Sidney's table-sized paper shredder. After finding and losing the third million as it falls out of the hands of a greedy aeronaut, they all give up as the movie ends. During the closing credits, Bob informs the audience that there is one million dollars somewhere in the US and if they follow the clues in specially marked Glad-Lock bags, they have the chance to win $1 million.

== Cast ==
- Tom Bosley as Sidney Preston
- Eddie Deezen as Rollie
- Wendy Sherman as Lollie
- Rick Overton as Stuart Briggs
- Mona Lyden as Barbara Briggs
- Douglas Emerson as Howie Briggs
- Royce D. Applegate as Tugger
- Pam Matteson as Dotty
- Rich Hall as Slaughter Buzzárd
- Daniel McDonald as Crush
- Penny Baker as Charity
- Tawny Fere as Faith
- LaGena Hart as Hope
- Hard Boiled Haggerty as Awful Abdul
- Bob Schott as Bad Boris
- Jamie Alcroft as Agent Bob
- Mack Dryden as Agent Fred
- Gail Neely as Officer Gretchen
- Kevin Pollak as Officer Quinn
- Peter Pitofsky as Phil
- Greg Travis as 2nd Toxic Man
- Tommy Sledge as Tommy Sledge
- Katie La Bourdette as Sledge's Secretary
- Christopher Cary as Chuck
- Sal Lopez as Gonzales
- Susanna Benn as Bonnie
- John Hammill as Captain
- Gary Kelson as Co-Pilot
- Paul Stader as Old Man in Car
- Rosemary Johnston as Old Woman in Car
- John Gilgreen as Motel Manager
- David Trim as Boy Scout Troop Leader
- Mark Regan as Newscaster
- Rudy De Luca as Money Counter

== Production ==
Parts of the film were shot at Glen Canyon in Utah.

While performing a routine stunt for this film, stuntman Dar Robinson died on November 21, 1986.

== Marketing contest ==
Producer Dino De Laurentiis conceived the idea for Million Dollar Mystery when he visited New York and saw a row of people lining up for what he presumably thought was a movie. A companion told De Laurentiis that they were actually lining up for lottery tickets.

Glad Bags sponsored a sweepstakes timed for the film's release. The company gave away entry forms, and the audience would fill out these forms with their answer to where the last million is hiding, based on clues given in the film. De Laurentiis said of the film:

This is a really broad comedy with car chases, designed for the young major moviegoing audience, about 12 to 24 years old. The sweepstakes gives us the potential to reach even more people – the infrequent moviegoer, the person more interested in winning a million dollars than in going to the movies, and these are the kind of people who use Glad Bags, housewives who maybe go to the movies once or twice a year.

De Laurentiis had high expectations for the film, but it did not turn out to be a hit. The winner of the contest ended up being 14-year-old Alesia Lenae Jones of Bakersfield, California, who successfully guessed that the loot was hidden in the bridge of the nose of the Statue of Liberty. Apparently, thousands of contestants had arrived at the same answer, and her entry was chosen in a random drawing.

== Reception ==
Million Dollar Mystery was a box office flop grossing $989,033 against a $10 million budget.

The film received negative critical reviews. The film holds a 0% rating on Rotten Tomatoes based on 6 reviews.

== Home media ==
The film was released on VHS and Laserdisc by HBO Video in 1987 with the contest info at the end of the movie omitted. It was later issued by Anchor Bay Entertainment on DVD on January 2, 2007 with the theatrical ending intact, and reissued again on DVD and Blu-ray by Kino Lorber on May 25, 2021.

== Award nominations ==
Golden Raspberry Awards

- Nominated: Worst Original Song, Barry Mann & John Lewis Parker (1988)
- Nominated: Worst Supporting Actor, Tom Bosley (1988)
- Nominated: Worst Supporting Actor, Jamie Alcroft (1988)
- Nominated: Worst Supporting Actor, Mack Dryden (1988)
