= Night of the Living Dead 3D: Re-Animation =

- Directed by: Jeff Broadstreet
- Screenplay by: Jeff Broadstreet
- Based on: characters created by Robert Valding
- Produced by: Jeff Broadstreet
- Starring: Andrew Divoff; Jeffrey Combs; Sarah Lieving; Denice Duff
- Cinematography: Andrew Parke
- Edited by: Jeff Broadstreet; Robert Valding
- Music by: Jason Brandt
- Production company: Dimensional Dead Productions
- Distributed by: Screen Media
- Release date: October 16, 2012
- Running time: 88 minutes
- Country: United States
- Language: English

Night of the Living Dead 3D: Re-Animation is a 2012 horror film prequel to the 2006 film, Night of the Living Dead 3D. It stars Andrew Divoff, who also served as co-producer, Jeffrey Combs, Sarah Lieving and Denice Duff.

== Plot ==
Pyrophobic mortician Gerald Tovar, Jr. inherits the family mortuary and accidentally exposes hundreds of uncremated bodies to toxic medical waste. As the corpses reanimate, Gerald’s inheritance-seeking younger brother, Harold, unexpectedly shows up and stumbles upon Gerald trying to keep the zombie outbreak under control. Sibling rivalry gives way to madness as Harold discovers Gerald’s dark secret–the freshly exhumed and zombified corpse of their father. The film also features a Sarah Palin spoof in the character of 'Sister Sara' (who works for a news outlet called 'Fixed News' which is apparently a spoof of Fox News) and makes references to the original 1968 Night of the Living Dead film with comments such as "They're Romero zombies" and "Pittsburgh is the zombie capital."

== Cast ==
- Andrew Divoff as Gerald Tovar Jr.
- Max Taylor as Young Gerald Tovar Jr.
- Jeffrey Combs as Harold Tovar
- Sarah Lieving as Cristie Forrest
- Robin Sydney as DyeAnne
- Adam Chambers as Russell
- Scott Thomson as Werner Gottshok
- Melissa Jo Bailey as Aunt Lou
- Rhonda Aldrich as Honey Del Amo
- Mark Sikes as Francis Del Amo
- Andra Kokott as Mrs. Block
- Ray Zone as Peter Block
- Kyle Morris as Eric Hadley
- Luis Accinelli as Gerald Tovar Sr. Zombie
- Dennis Hayden as Tall Zombie
- Brittani McNeal as Goth Zombie
- Denice Duff as Sister Sara
