= List of comedy films of the 2000s =

This is a list of comedy films released in the 2000s.

== 2000 ==
Title	Director	Cast	Country	Notes
100 Girls	Michael Davis	Jonathan Tucker, Larisa Oleynik, Jaime Pressly	United States	
101 Reykjavík	Baltasar Kormákur	Victoria Abril, Hilmir Snær Guðnason, Hanna María Karlsdóttir	Iceland	
102 Dalmatians	Kevin Lima	Glenn Close	United States	Family-oriented comedy
28 Days	Betty Thomas	Sandra Bullock, Viggo Mortensen, Dominic West	United States	Comedy-drama
Les acteurs	Bertrand Blier	André Dussollier, Jean-Pierre Marielle, Jacques Villeret	France	
The Adventures of Rocky and Bullwinkle	Des McAnuff	June Foray, Keith Scott, Piper Perabo, Rene Russo, Jason Alexander, Robert De Niro	United States	
Almost Famous	Cameron Crowe	Patrick Fugit, Billy Crudup, Frances McDormand, Kate Hudson	United States	Comedy-drama
Barking Dogs Never Bite	Bong Joon-ho	Bae Doona, Lee Sung-jae	South Korea	
Bedazzled	Harold Ramis	Brendan Fraser, Elizabeth Hurley, Frances O'Connor	United States	
Best in Show	Christopher Guest	Eugene Levy, Catherine O'Hara, Christopher Guest	United States	
Big Momma's House	Raja Gosnell	Martin Lawrence, Nia Long, Paul Giamatti	United States	
Billy Elliot	Stephen Daldry	Julie Walters, Jamie Bell, Gary Lewis	United Kingdom	Comedy-drama
Bread and Tulips	Silvio Soldini	Licia Maglietta, Bruno Ganz	Italy; Switzerland	Romantic comedy
Bring It On	Peyton Reed	Kirsten Dunst, Eliza Dushku, Jesse Bradford	United States	
Cecil B. Demented	John Waters	Melanie Griffith, Stephen Dorff, Alicia Witt	United States	
Charlie's Angels	McG	Cameron Diaz, Drew Barrymore, Lucy Liu	United States	Action-comedy
Cherry Falls	Geoffrey Wright	Michael Biehn, Brittany Murphy, Jay Mohr	United States	Horror comedy
Chicken Run	Nick Park, Peter Lord	Julia Sawalha, Mel Gibson, Miranda Richardson, Tony Haygarth	United Kingdom; United States	Stop-motion adventure comedy
Chuck & Buck	Miguel Arteta	Mike White, Chris Weitz, Lupe Ontiveros	United States	
Citizen Toxie: The Toxic Avenger IV	Lloyd Kaufman	David Mattey, Heidi S. Jursen, Clyde Lewis	United States	
Committed	Lisa Krueger	Heather Graham, Luke Wilson, Casey Affleck, Mark Ruffalo	United States	
Company Man	Peter Askin, Douglas McGrath	Douglas McGrath, Sigourney Weaver, John Turturro	United States	
Coyote Ugly	David McNally	Piper Perabo, John Goodman, Adam Garcia, Maria Bello	United States	Comedy-drama
Cut	Kimble Rendall	Molly Ringwald, Jessica Napier, Kylie Minogue	Australia	Horror comedy
Devils on the Doorstep	Jiang Wen	Jiang Wen, Teruyuki Kagawa, David Wu	China	
The Dish	Rob Sitch	Sam Neill, Kevin Harrington, Tom Long	Australia	Comedy-drama
Down to You	Kris Isacsson	Joanna Adler, Freddie Prinze, Jr., Julia Stiles, Jennifer Albano	United States	Romantic comedy
Drowning Mona	Nick Gomez	Danny DeVito, Bette Midler, Neve Campbell	United States	
Dr. Seuss' How the Grinch Stole Christmas	Ron Howard	Jim Carrey, Taylor Momsen, Jeffrey Tambor, Christine Baranski	United States	
Dr. T & the Women	Robert Altman	Richard Gere, Helen Hunt, Farrah Fawcett	United States	Comedy-drama
Dude, Where's My Car?	Danny Leiner	Ashton Kutcher, Seann William Scott, Kristy Swanson, Jennifer Garner	United States	
Duets	Bruce Paltrow	Maria Bello, Andre Braugher, Paul Giamatti	United States	Comedy-drama
The Flintstones in Viva Rock Vegas	Brian Levant	Mark Addy, Stephen Baldwin, Kristen Johnston	United States	
The Foul King	Kim Jee-woon	Song Kang-ho, Lee Ki-young, Jang Hang-sun	South Korea	Comedy-drama
Greenfingers	Joel Hershman	Clive Owen, David Kelly, Helen Mirren	United Kingdom; United States	Comedy-drama
Happy Accidents	Brad Anderson	Marisa Tomei, Vincent D'Onofrio, Nadia Dajani	United States	
Harry, He's Here to Help	Dominik Moll	Laurent Lucas, Sergi López, Mathilde Seigner	France	Comedy thriller, black comedy
High Fidelity	Stephen Frears	John Cusack, Iben Hjejle, Jack Black	United States	Comedy-drama
In July	Fatih Akin	Moritz Bleibtreu, Christiane Paul, Mehmet Kurtuluş	Germany	
The Ladies Man	Reginald Hudlin	Tim Meadows, Karyn Parsons, Billy Dee Williams	United States	
Life-Size	Mark Rosman	Tyra Banks, Lindsay Lohan	United States	Family-oriented comedy
Little Nicky	Steven Brill	Adam Sandler, Patricia Arquette, Harvey Keitel	United States	
Little Otik	Jan Švankmajer	Veronika Žilková, Jan Hartl	United Kingdom; Czech Republic	Horror comedy
Loser	Amy Heckerling	Jason Biggs, Mena Suvari, Zak Orth	United States	Romantic comedy
Lucky Numbers	Nora Ephron	John Travolta, Lisa Kudrow, Tim Roth	United States	
Me, Myself & Irene	Bobby Farrelly, Peter Farrelly	Jim Carrey, Renée Zellweger, Chris Cooper, Anthony Anderson	United States	
Me Myself I	Pip Karmel	Rachel Griffiths, David Roberts, Sandy Winton, Yael Stone, Shaun Loseby, Trent Sullivan	Australia	
Meet the Parents	Jay Roach	Robert De Niro, Ben Stiller	United States	
Miss Congeniality	Donald Petrie	Sandra Bullock, Michael Caine, Benjamin Bratt	United States	
Needing You...		Andy Lau	Hong Kong	Romantic comedy
Next Friday	Steve Carr	Ice Cube, Mike Epps, Justin Pierce	United States	
Nurse Betty	Neil LaBute	Renée Zellweger, Morgan Freeman, Chris Rock	United States	
Nutty Professor II: The Klumps	Peter Segal	Eddie Murphy, Janet Jackson, Larry Miller	United States	
O Brother, Where Art Thou?	Joel Coen	George Clooney, John Turturro, Tim Blake Nelson	United States	Comedy-drama
The Original Kings of Comedy	Spike Lee	Steve Harvey, D. L. Hughley, Cedric the Entertainer, Bernie Mac	United States	
Picking Up the Pieces	Alfonso Arau	Woody Allen, David Schwimmer, Kiefer Sutherland, Eddie Griffin	United States	
Play It to the Bone	Ron Shelton	Woody Harrelson, Antonio Banderas, Tom Sizemore	United States	Comedy-drama
Playing Mona Lisa	Matthew Huffman	Alicia Witt, Harvey Fierstein	United States	
Psycho Beach Party	Robert Lee King	Lauren Ambrose, Thomas Gibson, Kimberley Davies	United States	
Ready to Rumble	Brian Robbins	David Arquette, Oliver Platt, Scott Caan	United States	
The Replacements	Howard Deutch	Keanu Reeves, Gene Hackman	United States	
The Road to El Dorado	Don Paul, Eric "Bibo" Bergeron	Kenneth Branagh, Kevin Kline, Rosie Perez	United States	Animated film
Road Trip	Todd Phillips	Breckin Meyer, Tom Green, Seann William Scott, Amy Smart	United States	
Saving Grace	Nigel Cole	Brenda Blethyn, Craig Ferguson, Martin Clunes	United Kingdom	
Scary Movie	Keenen Ivory Wayans	Shawn Wayans, Marlon Wayans, Cheri Oteri, Shannon Elizabeth	United States	
Screwed	Larry Karaszewski	Norm Macdonald, Dave Chappelle, Elaine Stritch, Sherman Hemsley, Danny Devito	United States	
Shanghai Noon	Tom Dey	Jackie Chan, Owen Wilson, Lucy Liu	United States	
Shriek If You Know What I Did Last Friday the Thirteenth	John Blanchard	Tiffani-Amber Thiessen, Tom Arnold	United States	
Small Time Crooks	Woody Allen	Woody Allen, Tracey Ullman, Elaine May	United States	
Snatch	Guy Ritchie	Benicio del Toro, Dennis Farina, Vinnie Jones	United Kingdom; United States	Crime comedy
Snow Day	Chris Koch	Chris Elliott, Mark Webber, Jean Smart	United States	
Songs from the Second Floor	Roy Andersson	Lars Nordh, Stefan Larsson, Torbjorn Fahlstrom	Sweden	Comedy-drama
The Specials	Craig Mazin	Rob Lowe, Jamie Kennedy, Thomas Haden Church	United States	
State and Main	David Mamet	Alec Baldwin, Charles Durning, Clark Gregg	United States	
The Taste of Others	Agnès Jaoui	Jean-Pierre Bacri, Anne Alvaro, Agnès Jaoui	France	Comedy-drama
Together	Lukas Moodysson	Lisa Lindgren, Michael Nyqvist, Gustaf Hammarsten	Denmark; Italy; Sweden	Comedy-drama
What Women Want	Nancy Meyers	Mel Gibson, Helen Hunt	United States	Romantic comedy
The Whole Nine Yards	Jonathan Lynn, David Snyder	Bruce Willis, Matthew Perry, Rosanna Arquette	United States	
Wild Zero		Guitar Wolf	Japan	Horror comedy
Wonder Boys	Curtis Hanson	Michael Douglas, Tobey Maguire, Frances McDormand	United States	Comedy-drama

== 2001 ==
Title	Director	Cast	Country	Notes
The 51st State	Ronny Yu	Samuel L. Jackson, Robert Carlyle, Emily Mortimer	Canada; United Kingdom	Action comedy
The Accidental Spy	Teddy Chan	Jackie Chan, Eric Tsang, Vivian Hsu	Hong Kong	Comedy thriller
Amélie	Jean-Pierre Jeunet	Audrey Tautou, Mathieu Kassovitz, Rufus	France; Germany	Comedy-drama
America's Sweethearts	Joe Roth	Julia Roberts, Billy Crystal, Catherine Zeta-Jones	United States	Romantic comedy
The American Astronaut	Cory McAbee	Rocco Sisto, Annie Golden, Joshua Taylor	United States	
American Desi	Piyush Dinker Pandya	Rocco Sisto, Purva Bedi, Ronobir Lahiri	United States	
American Pie 2	J.B. Rogers	Jason Biggs, Shannon Elizabeth, Jennifer Coolidge	United States	
The Animal	Luke Greenfield	Rob Schneider, Colleen Haskell, John C. McGinley	United States	
Bandits	Barry Levinson	Bruce Willis, Billy Bob Thornton, Cate Blanchett	United States	Comedy-drama
Beethoven's 4th	David Mickey Evans	Judge Reinhold, Julia Sweeney, Joe Pichler	United States	
Black Knight	Gil Junger	Martin Lawrence, Tom Wilkonson, Marsha Thomason	United States	
Bridget Jones's Diary	Sharon Maguire	Renée Zellweger, Colin Firth, Hugh Grant	United States; United Kingdom	
The Brothers	Gary Hardwick	Morris Chestnut, D. L. Hughley, Bill Bellamy	United States	Comedy-drama
Bubble Boy	Blair Hayes	Jake Gyllenhaal, Swoosie Kurtz, Marley Shelton	United States	
Buffalo Soldiers	Gregor Jordan	Joaquin Phoenix, Anna Paquin, Scott Glenn	United Kingdom	Comedy-drama
Camouflage	James Keach	Leslie Nielsen, Lochlyn Munro, Vanessa Angel	United States Canada	
Cats & Dogs	Lawrence Guterman	Jeff Goldblum	United States	
The Closet	Francis Veber	Daniel Auteuil, Gérard Depardieu, Thierry Lhermitte	France	
Corky Romano	Rob Pritts	Chris Kattan, Vinessa Shaw, Peter Falk	United States	
CQ	Roman Coppola	Jeremy Davies, Élodie Bouchez, Gérard Depardieu	United States	Comedy-drama
Crocodile Dundee in Los Angeles	Simon Wincer	Paul Hogan, Linda Kozlowski, Jere Burns	Australia; United States	
The Curse of the Jade Scorpion	Woody Allen	Woody Allen, Dan Aykroyd, Helen Hunt	United States	
Don't Tempt Me	Agustín Díaz Yanes	Victoria Abril, Penélope Cruz, Demián Bichir	Mexico; Spain	
Double Take	George Gallo	Orlando Jones, Eddie Griffin, Edward Herrmann	United States	
Double Whammy	Tom DiCillo	Denis Leary, Elizabeth Hurley, Steve Buscemi	United States	Comedy-drama
Down to Earth	Chris Weitz, Paul Weitz	Chris Rock, Regina King, Chazz Palminteri, Jennifer Coolidge	United States	
Dr. Dolittle 2	Steve Carr	Eddie Murphy, Kristen Wilson, Steve Zahn, Lisa Kudrow, Jeffrey Jones	United States	
Elling	Petter Næss	Per Christian Ellefsen, Sven Nordin, Per Christensen	Norway	Comedy-drama
Elvira's Haunted Hills	Sam Irvin	Cassandra Peterson, Richard O'Brien, Mary Scheer	United States	
Evolution	Ivan Reitman	David Duchovny, Orlando Jones, Seann William Scott	United States	
Festival in Cannes	Henry Jaglom	Jenny Gabrielle, Greta Scacchi, Kim Kolarch	United States	
Freddy Got Fingered	Tom Green	Tom Green, Rip Torn, Marisa Coughlan	United States	
Get Over It	Tommy O'Haver	Kirsten Dunst, Ben Foster, Sisqó	United States	
Ghost World	Terry Zwigoff	Thora Birch, Steve Buscemi, Scarlett Johansson	United States	Comedy-drama
God Is Great and I'm Not	Pascale Bailly	Audrey Tautou, Édouard Baer, Julie Depardieu	France	
The Happiness of the Katakuris	Takashi Miike	Kenji Sawada, Keiko Matsuzaka, Shinji Takeda	Japan	Horror comedy
He Died with a Felafel in His Hand	Richard Lowenstein	Noah Taylor, Emily Hamilton, Romane Bohringer	Australia; Italy	Comedy-drama
Head over Heels	Mark S. Waters	Monica Potter, Freddie Prinze, Jr., Shalom Harlow	United States	
Heartbreakers	David Mirkin	Sigourney Weaver, Jennifer Love Hewitt, Ray Liotta	United States	
Hedwig and the Angry Inch	John Cameron Mitchell	John Cameron Mitchell, Miriam Shor, Stephen Trask	United States	Comedy-drama
How High	Jesse Dylan	Method Man, Redman, Obba Babatundé	United States	
Human Nature	Michel Gondry	Tim Robbins, Patricia Arquette, Rhys Ifans	France; United States	Comedy-drama
Jay and Silent Bob Strike Back	Kevin Smith	Kevin Smith, Jason Mewes, Shannen Doherty	United States	
Jesus Christ Vampire Hunter	Lee Gordon Demarbre	Guen Douglas, Josh Grace, Murielle Varhelyi	Canada	Horror comedy
Jimmy Neutron: Boy Genius	John A. Davis	Debi Derryberry, Patrick Stewart, Martin Short, Rob Paulsen, Jeffrey Garcia, Carolyn Lawrence, Candi Milo, Megan Cavanagh, Mark DeCarlo, Billy West	United States	Family-oriented comedy
Joe Dirt	Dennie Gordon	David Spade, Dennis Miller, Brittany Daniel	United States	
Joe Somebody	John Pasquin	Tim Allen, Hayden Panettiere, Patrick Warburton, Julie Bowen, Kelly Lynch	United States	
Josie and the Pussycats	Harry Elfont, Deborah Kaplan	Rachael Leigh Cook, Tara Reid, Rosario Dawson	United States	
Just Visiting	Jean-Marie Gaubert	Jean Reno, Christina Applegate, Christian Clavier	United States	
Kate & Leopold	James Mangold	Meg Ryan, Hugh Jackman, Liev Schreiber	United States	Romantic comedy
Kingdom Come	Doug McHenry	LL Cool J, Jada Pinkett Smith, Vivica A. Fox	United States	Comedy-drama
Legally Blonde	Robert Luketic	Reese Witherspoon, Luke Wilson, Selma Blair	United States	
The Lost Skeleton of Cadavra	Larry Blamire	Larry Blamire, Fay Masterson, Brian Howe	United States	
Lovely & Amazing	Nicole Holofcener	Catherine Keener, Brenda Blethyn, Emily Mortimer	United States	Comedy-drama
Made	Jon Favreau	Vince Vaughn, Jon Favreau, Sean Combs	United States	
The Man Who Sued God	Mark Joffe	Billy Connolly, Judy Davis, Colin Friels	Australia	
Max Keeble's Big Move	Tim Hill	Alex D. Linz, Larry Miller, Jamie Kennedy	United States	
Mean Machine	Barry Skolnick	Vinnie Jones, Jason Statham, David Kelly	United Kingdom; United States	
Mike Bassett: England Manager	Steven Barron	Ricky Tomlinson, Amanda Redman, Philip Jackson	United Kingdom	
Monkeybone	Henry Selick	Brendan Fraser, Bridget Fonda, Whoopi Goldberg	United States	
Monsoon Wedding	Mira Nair	Naseeruddin Shah, Lillete Dubey, Shefali Shetty	India; United States	Comedy-drama
Monsters, Inc.	Pete Docter, Lee Unkrich, David Silverman	John Goodman, Billy Crystal, Mary Gibbs	United States	Family-oriented comedy
Mr Bones	Gray Hofmeyr	David Ramsey, Faizon Love, Leon Schuster	South Africa	
My Sassy Girl	Kwak Jae-yong	Jun Ji-hyun, Cha Tae-hyun	South Korea	Romantic comedy
No Man's Land	Danis Tanović	Branco Djuric, Rene Bitorajac, Filip Šovagović	Belgium; Italy; France; Slovenia	Black comedy
No Such Thing	Hal Hartley	Sarah Polley, Robert Burke, Helen Mirren	United States	Comedy-drama
Not Another Teen Movie	Joel Gallen	Chyler Leigh, Chris Evans, Jaime Pressly	United States	
Novocaine	David Atikins	Steve Martin, Helena Bonham Carter, Laura Dern	United States	
One Night at McCool's	Harald Zwart	Liv Tyler, Matt Dillon, John Goodman	United States	
Ocean's Eleven	Steven Soderbergh	George Clooney, Matt Damon, Brad Pitt	United States	
Osmosis Jones	Farrelly brothers	Bill Murray	United States	
Out Cold	Emmett Malloy, Brendan Malloy	Jason London, Lee Majors, Willie Garson	United States	
Pootie Tang	Louis C.K.	Lance Crouther, Jennifer Coolidge, Wanda Sykes	United States	
Les Portes de la gloire	Christian Merret-Palmair	Benoît Poelvoorde, Julien Boisselier, Michel Duchaussoy	France	
The Princess Diaries	Garry Marshall	Anne Hathaway, Julie Andrews, Héctor Elizondo	United States	
Rat Race	Jerry Zucker	Rowan Atkinson, John Cleese, Whoopi Goldberg, Jon Lovitz, Cuba Gooding Jr., Seth Green, Breckin Meyer	United States	
Road to Redemption	Robert Vernon	Pat Hingle, Julie Condra, Leo Rossi, Jay Underwood, Tony Longo, Wes Studi	United States	Action comedy
The Royal Tenenbaums	Wes Anderson	Gene Hackman, Anjelica Huston, Ben Stiller	United States	Comedy-drama
Rush Hour 2	Brett Ratner	Chris Tucker, Jackie Chan, Chris Lone	United States	Action comedy
Saving Silverman	Dennis Dugan	Jason Biggs, Steve Zahn, Jack Black, Amanda Peet, Amanda Detmer	United States	
Say It Isn't So	J.B. Rogers	Chris Klein, Heather Graham, Sally Field, Orlando Jones	United States	
Scary Movie 2	Keenen Ivory Wayans	Anna Faris, Shawn Wayans, Marlon Wayans, David Cross, Chris Elliott	United States	
See Spot Run	John Whitesell	David Arquette, Michael Clarke Duncan, Leslie Bibb	United States	
Series 7: The Contenders	Daniel Minahan	Brooke Smith, Glenn Smith, Marylouise Burke	United States	
Shaolin Soccer	Stephen Chow	Stephen Chow, Zhao Wei, Ng Man-tat	Hong Kong	
Shallow Hal	The Farrelly brothers	Gwyneth Paltrow, Jack Black, Jason Alexander	United States	Romantic comedy
Shrek	Andrew Adamson, Vicky Jenson	Mike Myers, Eddie Murphy, Cameron Diaz	United States	Family-oriented comedy
Sidewalks of New York	Edward Burns	Edward Burns, Rosario Dawson, Dennis Farina	United States	Comedy-drama
Son of the Bride	Juan José Campanella	Ricardo Darín, Héctor Alterio, Norma Alterio	Spain; Argentina	Comedy-drama
Spy Kids	Robert Rodriguez	Antonio Banderas, Carla Gugino, Alexa Vega	United States	Family-oriented comedy
Storytelling	Todd Solondz	Selma Blair, Leo Fitzpatrick, Aleksa Palladino	United States	Comedy-drama
Sugar & Spice	Francine McDougall	Marley Shelton, James Marsden, Mena Suvari	United States	
Summer Catch	Mike Tollin	Freddie Prinze, Jr., Jessica Biel, Fred Ward	United States	Romantic comedy
Super Troopers	Jay Chandrasekhar	Jay Chandrasekhar, Kevin Heffernan, Steve Lemme	United States	
Tomcats	Gregory Poirier	Jerry O'Connell, Shannon Elizabeth, Jake Busey	United States	
Torrente 2: Misión en Marbella	Santiago Segura	Santiago Segura, Gabino Diego, Tony Leblanc	Spain	Action comedy
La Tour Montparnasse Infernale	Charles Nemes	Éric Judor, Serge Riaboukine, Michel Puterflam	France	
Town & Country	Peter Chelsom	Warren Beatty, Diane Keaton, Andie MacDowell, Goldie Hawn, Garry Shandling	United States	
Two Can Play That Game	Mark Brown	Vivica A. Fox, Morris Chestnut, Lee Anthony	United States	Romantic comedy
Va savoir	Jacques Rivette	Jeanne Balibar, Sergio Castellitto, Jacques Bonnaffé	France	
La Vérité si je mens ! 2	Thomas Gilou	Richard Anconina, José Garcia, Bruno Solo	France	
Visitor Q	Takashi Miike	Shôko Nakahara, Jun Muto, Kazushi Watanabe	Japan	Horror comedy
Wasabi	Gérard Krawczyk	Jean Reno, Ryōko Hirosue, Michel Muller	France	Action comedy
The Wash	DJ Pooh	Snoop Dogg, Dr. Dre, George Wallace	United States	
The Wedding Planner	Adam Shankman	Jennifer Lopez, Matthew McConaughey, Bridgette Wilson, Judy Greer	United States	Romantic comedy
Wet Hot American Summer	David Wain	Janeane Garofalo, David Hyde Pierce, Michael Showalter	United States	
What's the Worst That Could Happen?	Sam Weisman	Martin Lawrence, Danny DeVito, John Leguizamo	United States	
Y tu mamá también	Alfonso Cuarón	Maribel Verdú, Gael García Bernal, Diego Luna	Mexico	Comedy-drama
Zoolander	Ben Stiller	Ben Stiller, Owen Wilson, Will Ferrell	United States	

== 2002 ==
Title	Director	Cast	Country	Notes
24 Hour Party People	Michael Winterbottom	Steve Coogan, Shirley Henderson, Danny Cunningham	United Kingdom	Comedy-drama
40 Days and 40 Nights	Michael Lehmann	Josh Hartnett, Shannyn Sossamon, Paulo Costanzo	United States	Romantic comedy
8 Women	François Ozon	Catherine Deneuve, Isabelle Huppert, Emmanuelle Béart	France	
800 Bullets	Álex de la Iglesia	Sancho Gracia, Ángel de Andrés Lopez, Carmen Maura	Spain	
About a Boy	Chris Weitz, Paul Weitz	Hugh Grant, Nicholas Hoult, Toni Collette	United Kingdom; United States; France; Germany	Comedy-drama
Ice Age	Chris Wedge	Ray Romano, John Leguizamo, Denis Leary, Jack Black	United States	Animated adventure comedy
About Schmidt	Alexander Payne	Jack Nicholson, Hope Davis, Dermot Mulroney	United States	Comedy-drama
Adaptation.	Spike Jonze	Nicolas Cage, Meryl Streep, Chris Cooper	United States	Comedy-drama
The Adventures of Pluto Nash	Ron Underwood	Eddie Murphy, Randy Quaid, Rosario Dawson	United States	Sci-fi action comedy
All About the Benjamins	Kevin Bray	Ice Cube, Mike Epps, Eva Mendes	United States	Action comedy
American Girl	Jordan Brady	Jena Malone, Brad Renfro, Chris Mulkey	United States	Comedy-drama
Analyze That	Harold Ramis	Robert De Niro, Billy Crystal, Lisa Kudrow	United States	
L'Auberge espagnole	Cédric Klapisch	Romain Duris, Cécile de France, Judith Godrèche	France; Spain	Comedy-drama
Austin Powers in Goldmember	Jay Roach	Mike Myers, Beyoncé Knowles, Seth Green	United States	
Bad Company	Joel Schumacher	Anthony Hopkins, Chris Rock, Peter Macdissi	United States	Action comedy
The Banger Sisters	Bob Dolman	Goldie Hawn, Susan Sarandon, Geoffrey Rush	United States	
Barbershop	Tim Story	Ice Cube, Anthony Anderson, Cedric the Entertainer	United States	
Bend It Like Beckham	Gurinder Chadha	Parminder Nagra, Keira Knightley, Jonathan Rhys Meyers	United Kingdom	Comedy-drama
Big Fat Liar	Shawn Levy	Frankie Muniz, Paul Giamatti, Amanda Bynes	United States	
Big Trouble	Barry Sonnenfeld	Tim Allen, Rene Russo, Stanley Tucci	United States	
Le Boulet	Alain Berbérian, Frédéric Forestier	Gérard Lanvin, Benoît Poelvoorde, José Garcia	France; United Kingdom	Action comedy
Brown Sugar	Rick Famuyiwa	Taye Diggs, Sanaa Lathan, Mos Def	United States	Romantic comedy
Bubba Ho-tep	Don Coscarelli	Bruce Campbell, Ossie Davis, Ella Joyce	United States	Horror Comedy
Cabin Fever	Eli Roth	Jordan Ladd, James DeBello, Rider Strong	United States	Horror comedy
Cherish	Finn Taylor	Robin Turrey, Tim Blake Nelson, Brad Hunt	United States	Comedy-drama
Chinese Odyssey 2002	Jeffrey Lau	Tony Leung Chiu-Wai, Faye Wong, Vicki Zhao Wei	Hong Kong	
Comedian	Christian Charles	Jerry Seinfeld	United States	
Confessions of a Dangerous Mind	George Clooney	Sam Rockwell, Drew Barrymore, George Clooney	United States	Comedy-drama
The Country Bears	Peter Hastings	Haley Joel Osment, Christopher Walken, Stephen Tobolowsky, Diedrich Bader, Candy Ford, James Gammon, Brad Garrett, Daryl "Chill" Mitchell	United States	Family-oriented comedy
Crackerjack	Paul Moloney	Mick Molloy, Bill Hunter, Frank Wilson	Australia	
Crossroads	Tamra Davis	Britney Spears, Zoe Saldaña, Anson Mount	United States	Comedy-drama
Day of the Wacko	Marek Koterski	Marek Kondrat, Janina Traczykówna, Michal Koterski	Poland	Comedy-drama
Death to Smoochy	Danny DeVito	Robin Williams, Edward Norton, Catherine Keener, Pam Ferris	United States	
Dirty Deeds	David Caesar	Bryan Brown, Toni Collette, John Goodman	Australia	Crime comedy
Divine Secrets of the Ya-Ya Sisterhood	Callie Khouri	Sandra Bullock, Ellen Burstyn, Ashley Judd	United States	Comedy-drama
Divine Intervention	Elia Suleiman	Elia Suleiman, Manal Khader, Nayef Fahoum Daher	France; Germany; Morocco	Comedy-drama
Eight Crazy Nights	Seth Kearsley	Adam Sandler, Jackie Titone, Austin Stout	United States	Animated film
Eight Legged Freaks	Ellory Elkayem	David Arquette, Kari Wuhrer, Scott Terra	United States	Horror comedy
Filantropica	Nae Caranfil	Mircea Diaconu, Gheorghe Dinică, Mara Nicolescu	France; Romania	
Friday After Next	Marcus Raboy	Ice Cube, Mike Epps, John Witherspoon, Don "D.C." Curry, Bebe Drake, Terry Crews, Katt Williams, Rickey Smiley	United States	
FUBAR	Michael Dowse	Paul Spence, Dave Lawrence, Gordon Skilling	Canada	
The Good Girl	Miguel Arteta	Jennifer Aniston, Jake Gyllenhaal, John C. Reilly	United States	Comedy-drama
He Loves Me... He Loves Me Not	Laetitia Colombani	Audrey Tautou, Samuel Le Bihan, Isabelle Carré	France	Comedy-drama
Hey Arnold!: The Movie	Tuck Tucker		United States	Animated film
Hollywood Ending	Woody Allen	Woody Allen, Téa Leoni, Debra Messing	United States	
The Hot Chick	Tom Brady	Rob Schneider, Anna Faris, Rachel McAdams, Matthew Lawrence	United States	
I Spy	Betty Thomas	Eddie Murphy, Owen Wilson, Famke Janssen	United States	
Igby Goes Down	Burr Steers	Kieran Culkin, Susan Sarandon, Jeff Goldblum	United States	Comedy-drama
The Importance of Being Earnest	Oliver Parker	Rupert Everett, Colin Firth, Frances O'Connor	United Kingdom	Romantic comedy-drama
Interstate 60	Bob Gale	James Marsden, Amy Smart, Gary Oldman, Kurt Russell	United States	
Intimate Stories	Carlos Sorín	Javier Lombardo, Antonio Benedictis, Javiera Bravo	Spain; Argentina	Comedy-drama
Is It College Yet?	Karen Disher		United States	
Jackass: The Movie	Jeff Tremaine	Johnny Knoxville, Bam Margera, Chris Pontius	United States	
Juwanna Mann	Jesse Vaughan	Miguel A. Nuñez Jr., Vivica A. Fox, Kevin Pollak	United States	
Kung Pow! Enter the Fist	Steve Oedekerk	Steve Oedekerk, Lung Fei, Leo Lee	United States	
Life or Something Like It	Stephen Herek	Angelina Jolie, Edward Burns, Tony Shalhoub	United States	Comedy-drama
Like Mike	John Schultz	Lil' Bow Wow, Morris Chestnut, Jonathan Lipnicki	United States	
Lilo & Stitch	Chris Sanders, Dean DeBlois	Daveigh Chase, Chris Sanders, Tia Carrere, Ving Rhames, David Ogden Stiers, Kevin McDonald, Jason Scott Lee, Kevin Michael Richardson	United States	Animated film
Maid in Manhattan	Wayne Wang	Jennifer Lopez, Frances Conroy, Christopher Eigeman	United States	Romantic comedy
The Man Without a Past	Aki Kaurismäki	Markku Peltola, Kati Outinen, Juhani Niemela	Finland	Comedy-drama
The Master of Disguise	Perry Andelin Blake	Dana Carvey, Jennifer Esposito, Harold Gould	United States	
Men in Black II	Barry Sonnenfeld	Tommy Lee Jones, Will Smith, Rip Torn	United States	
Mr. Deeds	Steven Brill, Jared Harris	Adam Sandler, Winona Ryder, Peter Gallagher	United States	
My Big Fat Greek Wedding	Joel Zwick	Nia Vardalos, John Corbett, Michael Constantine	United States	Romantic comedy
National Lampoon's Van Wilder	Walter Becker	Ryan Reynolds, Tara Reid, Tim Matheson	United States	
The New Guy	Edward Decter	DJ Qualls, Eliza Dushku, Zooey Deschanel	United States	
Once Upon a Time in the Midlands	Shane Meadows	Robert Carlyle, Rhys Ifans, Kathy Burke	United Kingdom	Romantic comedy
Orange County	Jake Kasdan	Colin Hanks, Jack Black, Catherine O'Hara, Schuyler Fisk	United States	
Panchathanthiram	K. S. Ravikumar	Kamal Haasan, Simran, Ramya Krishnan, Jayaram, Ramesh Aravind, Sriman, Yugi Sethu, Urvashi, Aishwarya, Nagesh, Sanghavi	India	
Ping Pong	Fumihiko Sori	Yōsuke Kubozuka, Arata, Sam Lee	Japan	
Pumpkin	Tony R. Abrams, Adam Larson Broder	Christina Ricci, Hank Harris, Brenda Blethyn	United States	Romantic comedy
Punch-Drunk Love	Paul Thomas Anderson	Adam Sandler, Emily Watson, Philip Seymour Hoffman	United States	Comedy-drama
Real Women Have Curves	Patricia Cardoso	America Ferrera, Lupe Ontiveros, Ingrid Oliu	United States	Comedy-drama
Roger Dodger	Dylan Kidd	Campbell Scott, Jesse Eisenberg, Isabella Rossellini	United States	Comedy-drama
The Rules of Attraction	Roger Avary	James Van Der Beek, Ian Somerhalder, Shannyn Sossamon	Germany; United States	
The Santa Clause 2	Michael Lembeck	Tim Allen, Elizabeth Mitchell, David Krumholtz	United States	
Secretary	Steven Shainberg	Maggie Gyllenhaal, James Spader, Jeremy Davies	United States	Comedy-drama
Scooby-Doo	Raja Gosnell	Freddie Prinze, Jr., Sarah Michelle Gellar, Matthew Lillard	United States	
Serving Sara	Reginald Hudlin	Matthew Perry, Elizabeth Hurley, Bruce Campbell	United States	
Sex Is Comedy	Catherine Breillat	Anne Parillaud, Grégoire Colin, Roxane Mesquida	France	Comedy drama
Showtime	Tom Dey	Robert De Niro, Eddie Murphy, Rene Russo	United States	Action comedy
The Singles Ward	Kurt Hale		United States	Romantic comedy
Slackers	Dewey Nicks	Devon Sawa, Jason Schwartzman, James King	United States	
Slap Her... She's French	Melanie Mayron	Piper Perabo, Jane McGregor, Trent Ford	Germany	
Snow Dogs	Brian Levant	Cuba Gooding, Jr., James Coburn, Sisqó	United States	
Sorority Boys	Wallace Wolodarsky	Brad Beyer, Kathryn Stockwood, Heather Matarazzo	United States	
Spy Kids 2: The Island of Lost Dreams	Robert Rodriguez	Antonio Banderas, Carla Gugino, Alexa Vega	United States	Family-oriented comedy
Spun	Jonas Åkerlund	Jason Schwartzman, Brittany Murphy, John Leguizamo, Mena Suvari	United States	Crime comedy-drama
Stealing Harvard	Bruce McCulloch	Richard Jenkins, Tom Green, Leslie Mann, Seymour Cassel	United States	
Stuart Little 2	Rob Minkoff	Michael J. Fox, Geena Davis, Hugh Laurie, Jonathan Lipnicki, Nathan Lane, Melanie Griffith, James Woods	United States	
Sweet Home Alabama	Andy Tennant	Reese Witherspoon, Josh Lucas, Patrick Dempsey	United States	Romantic comedy
The Sweetest Thing	Roger Kumble	Cameron Diaz, Christina Applegate, Selma Blair	United States	
The Tuxedo	Kevin Donovan	Jackie Chan, Jennifer Love Hewitt, Jason Isaacs	United States	Science fiction action-comedy
Two Weeks Notice	Marc Lawrence	Sandra Bullock, Hugh Grant, Alicia Witt	United States	Romantic comedy
Undercover Brother	Malcolm D. Lee	Eddie Griffin, Chris Kattan, Aunjanue Ellis	United States	
Wilbur Wants to Kill Himself	Lone Scherfig	Jamie Sives, Adrian Rawlins, Shirley Henderson	Denmark; United Kingdom	Comedy-drama

== 2003 ==
Title	Director	Cast	Country	Notes
Agent Cody Banks	Harald Zwart	Frankie Muniz, Hilary Duff, Angie Harmon	United States	Action comedy
Alex & Emma	Rob Reiner	Luke Wilson, Kate Hudson, Jordan Lund	United States	Comedy-drama
American Splendor	Shari Springer Berman, Robert Pulcini	Paul Giamatti, Hope Davis, Harvey Pekar	United States	Comedy-drama
American Wedding	Jesse Dylan	Jason Biggs, Alyson Hannigan, January Jones	United States	
Anger Management	Peter Segal	Adam Sandler, Jack Nicholson, Marisa Tomei	United States	
Anything Else	Woody Allen	Woody Allen, Jason Biggs, Christina Ricci	United States	Romantic comedy
Bad Boys II	Michael Bay	Martin Lawrence, Will Smith, Jordi Mollà	United States	Action comedy
Bad Santa	Terry Zwigoff	Billy Bob Thornton, Tony Cox, Brett Kelly	United States	
The Barbarian Invasions	Denys Arcand	Rémy Girard, Stéphane Rousseau, Marie-Josée Croze	Canada; France	Comedy-drama
Beethoven's 5th	Mark Griffiths	John Larroquette, Faith Ford, Dave Thomas	United States	
Big Fish	Tim Burton	Ewan McGregor, Albert Finney, Billy Crudup	United States	Fantasy comedy-drama
Bringing Down the House	Adam Shankman	Steve Martin, Queen Latifah, Eugene Levy	United States	
Bruce Almighty	Tom Shadyac	Jim Carrey, Jennifer Aniston, Morgan Freeman	United States	
Bulletproof Monk	Paul Hunter	Chow Yun-fat, Seann William Scott, Jaime King	United States	Action comedy
Calendar Girls	Nigel Cole	Helen Mirren, Julie Walters, John Alderton	United Kingdom	
The Cat in the Hat	Bo Welch	Mike Myers, Dakota Fanning, Spencer Breslin, Kelly Preston, Sean Hayes, Alec Baldwin	United States	Family-oriented comedy
Charlie's Angels: Full Throttle	McG	Cameron Diaz, Drew Barrymore, Lucy Liu	United States	Action-comedy
Cheaper by the Dozen	Shawn Levy	Steve Martin, Bonnie Hunt, Piper Perabo	United States	
Coffee and Cigarettes	Jim Jarmusch	Roberto Benigni, Steven Wright, Joie Lee	United States	
Daddy Day Care	Steve Carr	Eddie Murphy, Jeff Garlin, Steve Zahn	United States	
Death of a Dynasty	Damon Dash	Ebon Moss-Bachrach, Devon Aoki, Capone	United States	
Deliver Us from Eva	Gary Hardwick	Gabrielle Union, LL Cool J, Duane Martin	United States	
Dickie Roberts: Former Child Star	Sam Weisman	David Spade, Mary McCormack, Jon Lovitz	United States	
Down with Love	Peyton Reed	Renée Zellweger, Ewan McGregor, Sarah Paulson	United States	Romantic comedy
Dumb and Dumberer: When Harry Met Lloyd	Troy Miller	Eric Christian Olsen, Derek Richardson, Rachel Nichols	United States	
Duplex	Danny DeVito	Ben Stiller, Drew Barrymore, Eileen Essell	United States	
Elf	Jon Favreau	Will Ferrell, Ed Asner, James Caan	United States	
Fake ID	Gil D. Reyes	Stuart Perelmuter, Brian Gligor, Nina Burns, Mark Fisher, Michael Cyril Creighton	United States	Gay-themed comedy
Fear and Trembling	Alain Corneau	Sylvie Testud, Kaori Tsuji, Taro Suwa	France	Comedy-drama
Finding Nemo	Andrew Stanton, Lee Unkrich	Albert Brooks, Ellen DeGeneres, Alexander Gould, Willem Dafoe, Geoffrey Rush	United States	Animated adventure comedy film
Freaky Friday	Mark S. Waters	Jamie Lee Curtis, Lindsay Lohan, Mark Harmon	United States	
From Justin to Kelly	Robert Iscove	Kelly Clarkson, Justin Guarini, Katherine Bailess	United States	Romantic comedy
George of the Jungle 2	David Grossman	Christopher Showerman, Julie Benz, Thomas Haden Church	United States	
Gigli	Martin Brest	Ben Affleck, Jennifer Lopez, Justin Bartha	United States	Romantic crime comedy
Good Boy!	John Hoffman	Molly Shannon, Liam Aiken, Kevin Nealon	United States	
Gozu	Takashi Miike	Hideki Sone, Show Aikawa, Kimika Yoshino	Japan	Horror comedy
The Green Butchers	Anders Thomas Jensen	Mads Mikkelsen, Nikolaj Lie Kaas, Line Kruse	Denmark	
A Guy Thing	Chris Koch	Jason Lee, Julia Stiles, Selma Blair	United States	
G-SALE	Randy Nargi		United States	
Harvie Krumpet	Adam Elliot		Australia	Clay animated comedy-drama
The Haunted Mansion	Rob Minkoff	Eddie Murphy, Terence Stamp, Wallace Shawn	United States	Family-oriented comedy
Head of State	Chris Rock	Chris Rock, Bernie Mac, Dylan Baker	United States	
Hollywood Homicide	Ron Shelton	Harrison Ford, Josh Hartnett, Lena Olin	United States	Action-comedy
How to Lose a Guy in 10 Days	Donald Petrie	Kate Hudson, Matthew McConaughey, Adam Goldberg	United States	Romantic comedy
The In-Laws	Andrew Fleming	Michael Douglas, Albert Brooks, Robin Tunney	United States	
Inspector Gadget 2	Alex Zamm	French Stewart, Elaine Hendrix, D.L. Hughley, Tony Martin	United States	
Intermission	John Crowley	Colin Farrell, Shirley Henderson, Kelly Macdonald	Ireland	Comedy-drama
Intolerable Cruelty	Joel Coen	George Clooney, Catherine Zeta-Jones, Geoffrey Rush	United States	
Johnny English	Peter Howitt	Rowan Atkinson, John Malkovich, Natalie Imbruglia	United Kingdom; United States	
Just Married	Shawn Levy	Ashton Kutcher, Brittany Murphy, Christian Kane	United States	
Kangaroo Jack	David McNally	Jerry O'Connell, Anthony Anderson, Estella Warren, Christopher Walken	United States	
Kitchen Stories	Bent Hamer	Joachim Calmeyer, Tomas Norström, Bjørn Floberg	Norway; Sweden	
Kopps	Josef Fares	Fares Fares, Torkel Petersson, Göran Ragnerstam	Sweden	Action-comedy
Legally Blonde 2: Red, White & Blonde	Charles Herman-Wurmfeld	Reese Witherspoon, Sally Field, Regina King	United States	
The Lizzie McGuire Movie	Jim Fall	Hilary Duff, Yani Gellman, Adam Lamberg	United States	
Looney Tunes: Back in Action	Joe Dante	Brendan Fraser, Jenna Elfman, Joe Alaskey, Billy West, Jeff Bennett, Eric Goldberg, June Foray, Bob Bergen, Will Ryan, Stan Freberg, Bruce Lanoil, Paul Julian, Steve Martin	United States	
Lost in Translation	Sofia Coppola	Bill Murray, Scarlett Johansson, Giovanni Ribisi	United States	Comedy-drama
Love Actually	Richard Curtis	Alan Rickman, Bill Nighy, Colin Firth	United Kingdom	Romantic comedy-drama
Love Me If You Dare	Yann Samuell	Guillaume Canet, Marion Cotillard, Thibault Verhaeghe	Belgium	Romantic ccomedy-drama
Malibu's Most Wanted	John Whitesell	Jamie Kennedy, Taye Diggs, Anthony Anderson	United States	
Marci X	Richard Benjamin	Lisa Kudrow, Damon Wayans, Richard Benjamin	United States	
Matchstick Men	Ridley Scott	Nicolas Cage, Sam Rockwell, Alison Lohman	United States	
The Medallion	Gordon Chan	Jackie Chan, Lee Evans, Claire Forlani	United States; Hong Kong	Action comedy
A Mighty Wind	Christopher Guest	Bob Balaban, Christopher Guest, Catherine O'Hara	United States	
National Lampoon Presents Dorm Daze	David Hillenbrand, Scott Hillenbrand	Patrick Renna, Danielle Fishel, Chris Owen	United States	
National Security	Dennis Dugan	Martin Lawrence, Steve Zahn, Colm Feore	United States	
Nothing	Vincenzo Natali	David Hewlett, Andrew Miller, Marie-Josée Croze	Canada	Comedy-drama
Old School	Todd Phillips	Luke Wilson, Will Ferrell, Vince Vaughn	United States	
Pauly Shore Is Dead	Pauly Shore	Pauly Shore, Rick Ducommun, Todd Bridges	United States	
Pirates of the Caribbean: The Curse of the Black Pearl	Gore Verbinski	Johnny Depp, Geoffrey Rush, Orlando Bloom	United States	Adventure fantasy comedy
The Rundown	Peter Berg	The Rock, Seann William Scott, Rosario Dawson	United States	Action-adventure comedy
Save the Green Planet!	Jang Joon-hwan	Shin Ha-kyun, Baek Yoon-sik, Hwang Jeong-min	South Korea	Science fiction comedy
Scary Movie 3	David Zucker	Anna Faris, Anthony Anderson, Leslie Nielsen	United States	
School of Rock	Richard Linklater	Jack Black, Joan Cusack, Mike White	United States	
Schultze Gets the Blues	Michael Schorr	Horst Krause, Harald Warmbrunn, Karl-Fred Mueller	Germany	Comedy-drama
Shanghai Knights	David Dobkin	Jackie Chan, Owen Wilson, Aaron Johnson	United States	
Slim Susie	Ulf Malmros	Jonas Rimeika, Tuva Novotny, Kjell Bergqvist	Sweden	
Something's Gotta Give	Nancy Meyers	Jack Nicholson, Diane Keaton, Keanu Reeves	United States	Romantic comedy
The Station Agent	Tom McCarthy	Peter Dinklage, Patricia Clarkson, Bobby Cannavale	United States	Comedy-drama
Stuck on You	Bobby Farrelly, Peter Farrelly	Matt Damon, Greg Kinnear, Eva Mendes	United States	
Tokyo Godfathers	Satoshi Kon		Japan	
The Triplets of Belleville	Sylvain Chomet		Belgium; Canada; France	Animated film
Undead	Michael Spierig, Peter Spierig	Felicity Mason, Mungo McKay, Rob Jenkins	Australia	Horror comedy
Uptown Girls	Boaz Yakin	Brittany Murphy, Dakota Fanning, Heather Locklear, Donald Faison	United States	Comedy-drama
View from the Top	Bruno Barreto	Gwyneth Paltrow, Mark Ruffalo, Candice Bergen	United States	
What a Girl Wants	Dennie Gordon	Amanda Bynes, Colin Firth, Kelly Preston	United States	

== 2004 ==
Title	Director	Cast	Country	Notes
13 Going on 30	Gary Winick	Jennifer Garner, Mark Ruffalo, Judy Greer	United States	
50 First Dates	Peter Segal	Adam Sandler, Drew Barrymore, Rob Schneider	United States	Romantic comedy
Adam & Paul	Lenny Abrahamson	Mark O'Halloran, Tom Murphy, Lousie Lewis	Ireland	Comedy-drama
After the Sunset	Michael Lehmann	Pierce Brosnan, Salma Hayek, Woody Harrelson	United States	Criminal comedy
Agent Cody Banks 2: Destination London	Kevin Allen	Frankie Muniz, Anthony Anderson, Hannah Spearritt	United States	Action comedy
Along Came Polly	John Hamburg	Ben Stiller, Jennifer Aniston, Philip Seymour Hoffman	United States	
Anchorman: The Legend of Ron Burgundy	Adam McKay	Will Ferrell, Christina Applegate, Paul Rudd	United States	
Around the World in 80 Days	Frank Coraci	Jackie Chan, Steve Coogan, Jim Broadbent	United States; United Kingdom; Germany; Ireland	Adventure comedy
Barbershop 2: Back in Business	Kevin Rodney Sullivan	Ice Cube, Cedric the Entertainer, Sean Patrick Thomas	United States	
The Big Bounce	George Armitage	Owen Wilson, Morgan Freeman, Gary Sinise	United States	
Bridget Jones: The Edge of Reason	Beeban Kidron	Renée Zellweger, Hugh Grant, Colin Firth	United Kingdom; United States	Romantic comedy
The Calamari Wrestler	Minoru Kawasaki	Miyako Kamohashi, Minoru Kawasak, Kana Ishida	Japan	
Choking Hazard	Marek Dobes	Jaroslav Dušek, Jan Dolanský, Anna Fialkova	Czech Republic	Comedy horror
Christmas in Love	Neri Parenti	Christian de Sica, Massimo Boldi, Danny DeVito	Italy	Romantic comedy
Christmas with the Kranks	Joe Roth	Tim Allen, Jamie Lee Curtis, Dan Aykroyd	United States	
Citizen Dog	Wisit Sasanatieng	Mahasmut Bunyaraksh, Sanftong Ket-U-Tong, Sawatwong Palakawong	Thailand	Romantic comedy
Club Dread	Jay Chandrasekhar	Bill Paxton, Jay Chandrasekhar, Kevin Heffernan	United States	
Connie and Carla	Michael Lembeck	Nia Vardalos, Toni Collette, David Duchovny	United States	
The Cookout	Lance Rivera	Ja Rule, Tim Meadows, Storm P	United States	
Crimen Ferpecto	Álex de la Iglesia	Guillermo Toledo, Monica Cervera, Luis Varela	Italy; Spain	Comedy-drama
Cutie Honey	Hideaki Anno	Eriko Sato, Mikako Ichikawa, Jun Murakami	Japan	Science fiction comedy
Dead & Breakfast	Matthew Leutwyler	Ever Carradine, Brent David Fraser, Bianca Lawson	United States	
D.E.B.S.	Angela Robinson	Sara Foster, Jordana Brewster, Meagan Good	United States	Action Comedy
A Dirty Shame	John Waters	Tracey Ullman, Johnny Knoxville, Selma Blair	United States	
DodgeBall: A True Underdog Story	Rawson Marshall Thurber	Vince Vaughn, Ben Stiller, Christine Taylor, Justin Long, Stephen Root, Alan Tudyk, Joe David Moore, Rip Torn	United States	
Ella Enchanted	Tommy O'Haver	Anne Hathaway, Hugh Dancy, Cary Elwes	United States; Ireland; United Kingdom	Fantasy romantic comedy
Envy	Barry Levinson	Ben Stiller, Jack Black, Rachel Weisz, Amy Poehler	United States	
Eulogy	Michael Clancy	Hank Azaria, Jesse Bradford, Zooey Deschanel	United States	Comedy-drama
EuroTrip	Jeff Schaffer	Scott Mechlowicz, Jacob Pitts, Michelle Trachtenberg	United States	
Fat Albert	Joel Zwick	Kenan Thompson, Kyla Pratt, Shedrack Anderson III	United States	
First Daughter	Forest Whitaker	Katie Holmes, Marc Blucas, Amerie	United States	Comedy-drama
Garden State	Zach Braff	Zach Braff, Natalie Portman, Peter Sarsgaard	United States	Comedy-drama
Garfield: The Movie	Peter Hewitt	Bill Murray, Breckin Meyer, Jennifer Love Hewitt, Debra Messing	United States	
The Girl Next Door	Luke Greenfield	Elisha Cuthbert, Emile Hirsch, Timothy Olyphant	United States	Romantic comedy
Hair High	Bill Plympton		United States	Animated film
Happily Ever After	Yvan Attal		France	Comedy-drama
Harold & Kumar Go to White Castle	Danny Leiner	John Cho, Kal Penn, Paula Garcés	United States	
Home on the Range	Will Finn, John Sanford		United States	Animated comedy western
I Heart Huckabees	David O. Russell	Jason Schwartzman, Isabelle Huppert, Dustin Hoffman, Lily Tomlin	United States	Comedy-drama
In Good Company	Paul Weitz	Dennis Quaid, Topher Grace, Scarlett Johansson	United States	Comedy-drama
Incident at Loch Ness	Zak Penn	Werner Herzog, Kitana Baker, Gabriel Beristain	United States	
Inconscientes	Joaquin Oristrell	Leonor Watling, Luis Tosar	Spain	
It's All Gone Pete Tong	Michael Dowse	Paul Kaye, Beatriz Batarda, Mike Wilmot	Canada; United Kingdom	
Jersey Girl	Kevin Smith	Ben Affleck, Liv Tyler, Raquel Castro	United States	Comedy-drama
Johnson Family Vacation	Christopher Erskin	Cedric the Entertainer, Vanessa Williams, Solange Knowles	United States	
Kamikaze Girls	Tetsuya Nakashima	Kyoko Fukada, Anna Tsuchiya	Japan	Comedy-drama
Knots	Greg Lombardo	Scott Cohen, John Stamos, Annabeth Gish	United States	
Kung Fu Hustle	Stephen Chow	Stephen Chow, Yuen Wah, Leung Siu Lung	China; Hong Kong	Action comedy
The Ladykillers	Ethan Coen, Joel Coen	Tom Hanks, Marlon Wayans, J.K. Simmons	United States	
Lemony Snicket's A Series of Unfortunate Events	Brad Silberling	Jim Carrey, Liam Aiken, Emily Browning	United States	
The Life Aquatic with Steve Zissou	Wes Anderson	Bill Murray, Owen Wilson, Cate Blanchett	United States	Comedy-drama
Life Is a Miracle	Emir Kusturica	Slavko Stimac, Natasa Solak, Vesna Trivalic	France; Serbia	Comedy-drama
Look at Me	Agnès Jaoui	Marilou Berry, Agnès Jaoui, Jean-Pierre Bacri	France	Comedy-drama
Mean Girls	Mark S. Waters	Lindsay Lohan, Rachel McAdams, Tina Fey	United States	
Melinda and Melinda	Woody Allen	Radha Mitchell, Chloë Sevigny, Jonny Lee Miller	United States	Comedy-drama
Meet the Fockers	Jay Roach	Robert De Niro, Ben Stiller, Dustin Hoffman	United States	
Millions	Danny Boyle	Alex Etel, Lewis McGibbon, James Nesbitt	United Kingdom	Comedy-drama
Mind Game	Masaaki Yuasa		Japan	Comedy-drama
Mr. 3000	Charles Stone III	Bernie Mac, Angela Bassett, Brian J. White	United States	
Napoleon Dynamite	Jared Hess	Jon Heder, Jon Gries, Aaron Ruel	United States	
New York Minute	Conrad E. Palmisano, Dennie Gordon	Ashley Olsen, Mary-Kate Olsen, Eugene Levy	United States	
Nora's Hair Salon	Jerry LaMothe	Jenifer Lewis, Tamala Jones, Tatyana Ali	United States	Comedy-drama
Ocean's Twelve	Steven Soderbergh	George Clooney, Brad Pitt, Matt Damon	United States	
Palindromes	Todd Solondz	Ellen Barkin, Stephen Adly-Guirgis, Jennifer Jason Leigh	United States	Comedy-drama
RRRrrrr!!!	Alain Chabat	Maurice Barthélemy, Jean-Paul Rouve, Pef Martin Laval	France	
SARS Wars	Taweewat Wanta	Tep Pho-Ngam, Supakorn Kitsuwon, Somlek Sakdikul	Thailand	Horror comedy
Scooby-Doo 2: Monsters Unleashed	Raja Gosnell	Freddie Prinze, Jr., Sarah Michelle Gellar, Matthew Lillard	United States	
Seed of Chucky	Don Mancini	Brad Dourif, Jennifer Tilly, Billy Boyd	United States	Horror comedy
Sex Lives of the Potato Men	Andy Humphries	Johnny Vegas, Mackenzie Crook, Mark Gatiss	United Kingdom	
Shall We Dance?	Peter Chelsom	Richard Gere, Jennifer Lopez, Susan Sarandon	United States	Comedy-drama
Shark Tale	Bibo Bergeron, Vicky Jenson, Rob Letterman		United States	Family-oriented comedy
Shaun of the Dead	Edgar Wright	Simon Pegg, Kate Ashfield, Nick Frost	United Kingdom	
She Hate Me	Spike Lee	Anthony Mackie, Kerry Washington, Ellen Barkin	United States	Comedy-drama
Shrek 2	Andrew Adamson, Conrad Vernon, Kelly Asbury		United States	Family-oriented comedy
Sideways	Alexander Payne	Paul Giamatti, Thomas Haden Church, Virginia Madsen	United States	Comedy-drama
Sleepover	Joe Nussbaum	Alexa Vega, Mika Boorem, Scout Taylor-Compton	United States	
Soul Plane	Jessy Terrero	Kevin Hart, Tom Arnold, Method Man	United States	
Spanglish	James L. Brooks	Adam Sandler, Téa Leoni, Paz Vega	United States	Comedy-drama
The SpongeBob SquarePants Movie	Stephen Hillenburg	Tom Kenny, Bill Fagerbakke, Clancy Brown, Rodger Bumpass, Mr. Lawrence, Jill Talley, Carolyn Lawrence, Mary Jo Catlett, Alec Baldwin, David Hasselhoff, Scarlett Johansson, Jeffrey Tambor	United States	Family-oriented comedy
Starsky & Hutch	Todd Phillips	Ben Stiller, Owen Wilson, Snoop Dogg	United States	
The Stepford Wives	Frank Oz	Nicole Kidman, Matthew Broderick, Bette Midler	United States	
Straight-Jacket	Richard Day	Matt Letscher, Carrie Preston, Veronica Cartwright	United States	
Superbabies: Baby Geniuses 2	Bob Clark	Jon Voigt, Scott Biao, Vanessa Angel	Germany; United States	
Surviving Christmas	Mike Mitchell	Ben Affleck, James Gandolfini, Christina Applegate	United States	
Swing Girls	Shinobu Yaguchi	Juri Ueno, Yuta Hiraoka, Naoto Takenaka	Japan	
The Taste of Tea	Katsuhito Ishii	Mayo Banno, Takahiro Sano, Tadanobu Asano	Japan	Comedy-drama
Taxi	Tim Story	Queen Latifah, Jimmy Fallon, Gisele Bündchen	United States	
Team America: World Police	Trey Parker		United States	
The Terminal	Steven Spielberg	Tom Hanks, Catherine Zeta-Jones, Stanley Tucci	United States	Comedy-drama
To Catch a Virgin Ghost			South Korea	
The Wedding	Wojciech Smarzowski	Marian Dziedziel, Iwona Bielska, Maciej Stuhr	Poland	
Welcome to Mooseport	Donald Petrie	Ray Romano, Gene Hackman, Marcia Gay Harden, Maura Tierney, Christine Baranski, Fred Savage, Rip Torn	United States	
White Chicks	Keenen Ivory Wayans	Shawn Wayans, Marlon Wayans, Jaime King	United States	
The Whole Ten Yards	Howard Deutch	Bruce Willis, Matthew Perry, Amanda Peet	United States	
Win a Date with Tad Hamilton!	Robert Luketic	Kate Bosworth, Topher Grace, Josh Duhamel	United States	Romantic comedy
Without a Paddle	Steven Brill	Seth Green, Matthew Lillard, Dax Shepard	United States	
Zebraman	Takashi Miike	Sho Aikawa, Kyōka Suzuki, Teruyoshi Uchimura	Japan	
Zombie Honeymoon	Dave Gebroe	Tracy Coogan, Graham Sibley, Tonya Cornelisse	United States	Horror comedy, romantic comedy

== 2005 ==
Title	Director	Cast	Country	Notes
The 40-Year-Old Virgin	Judd Apatow	Steve Carell, Catherine Keener, Paul Rudd	United States	
Adam & Steve	Craig Chester	Craig Chester, Malcolm Gets, Parker Posey	United States	
Adam's Apples	Anders Thomas Jensen	Ulrich Thomsen, Mads Mikkelsen, Nikolaj Lie Kaas	Denmark	Comedy-drama
American Pie Presents: Band Camp	Steve Rash	Tad Hilgenbrinck, Angela Little, Arielle Kebbel	United States	
Are We There Yet?	Brian Levant	Ice Cube, Nia Long, Aleisha Allen, Philip Daniel Bolden	United States	
The Aristocrats	Paul Provenza	Alan Kirschenbaum, Allan Havey, Andy Dick	United States	
The Art of Seduction	Oh Ki-hwan	Son Ye-jin, Song Il-gook	South Korea	Romantic comedy
Bad News Bears	Richard Linklater	Billy Bob Thornton, Greg Kinnear, Marcia Gay Harden	United States	
The Baxter	Michael Showalter	Michael Showalter, Elizabeth Banks, Michelle Williams	United States	
Beauty Shop	Bille Woodruff	Queen Latifah, Alfre Woodard, Alicia Silverstone	United States	
Bewitched	Nora Ephron	Nicole Kidman, Will Ferrell, Shirley MacLaine	United States	
The Big White	Mark Mylod	Robin Williams, Holly Hunter, Giovanni Ribisi	Canada; New Zealand	
Bob the Butler	Gary Sinyor	Tom Green, Brooke Shields, Genevieve Buechner, Benjamin B. Smith, Rob LaBelle, Valerie Tian, Simon Callow	United States	
Boy Eats Girl	Stephen Bradley	Samantha Mumba, David Leon, Deirdre O'Kane	Ireland	Horror comedy
Breakfast on Pluto	Neil Jordan	Cillian Murphy, Stephen Rea, Brendan Gleeson	Ireland; United Kingdom	Comedy-drama
Cheaper by the Dozen 2	Adam Shankman	Steve Martin, Eugene Levy, Bonnie Hunt	United States	
Chicken Little	Mark Dindal		United States	Family-oriented comedy
The Chumscrubber	Arie Posin	Jamie Bell, Camilla Belle, Justin Chatwin	United States	Comedy-drama
A Cock and Bull Story	Michael Winterbottom	Steve Coogan, Rob Brydon, Raymond Waring	United Kingdom	
Colour Me Kubrick	Brian Cook	John Malkovich, Jim Davidson, Richard E. Grant	France; United Kingdom	
The Comedians of Comedy	Michael Blieden	Brian Posehn, Maria Bamford, Patton Oswalt	United States	
Corpse Bride	Tim Burton, Mike Johnson		United Kingdom; United States	Fantasy-comedy, romantic comedy
Le Couperet	Costa-Gavras	José Garcia, Karin Viard, Olivier Gourmet	Belgium; France; Spain	Thriller comedy-drama
Dark Horse	Dagur Kári	Jakob Cedergren, Tilly Scott Pederse, Nicolas Bro	Denmark; Iceland	Comedy-drama
Dave Chappelle's Block Party	Michel Gondry	Dave Chappelle, Kanye West, Mos Def	United States	
Deuce Bigalow: European Gigolo	Mike Bigelow	Rob Schneider, Eddie Griffin, Jeroen Krabbé	United States	
Diary of a Mad Black Woman	Darren Grant	Kimberly Elise, Steve Harris, Shemar Moore	United States	Comedy-drama
Dirty Deeds	David Kendall	Milo Ventimiglia, Lacey Chabert, Arielle Kebbel	United States	
The Dukes of Hazzard	Jay Chandrasekhar	Johnny Knoxville, Seann William Scott, Jessica Simpson	United States	
Everything Is Illuminated	Liev Schreiber	Elijah Wood, Eugene Hutz, Boris Leskin	United States	Comedy-drama
Evil Aliens	Jake West	Emily Booth, Christopher Adamson, Norman Lovett	United Kingdom	Horror comedy, slapstick
Fever Pitch	Farrelly brothers	Drew Barrymore, Jimmy Fallon, Jason Spevack	United States	Romantic comedy
Fun with Dick and Jane	Dean Parisot	Jim Carrey, Téa Leoni, Alec Baldwin	United States	
The Girl from Monday	Hal Hartley	Bill Sage, Sabrina Lloyd, Tatiana Abracos	United States	
Guess Who	Kevin Rodney Sullivan	Bernie Mac, Ashton Kutcher, Zoe Saldaña	United States	
Herbie: Fully Loaded	Angela Robinson	Lindsay Lohan, Justin Long, Breckin Meyer	United States	
Hitch	Andy Tennant	Will Smith, Eva Mendes, Kevin James	United States	
The Hitchhiker's Guide to the Galaxy	Garth Jennings	Martin Freeman, Mos Def, Sam Rockwell	United Kingdom; United States	Sci-fi comedy
The Honeymooners	John Schultz	Cedric the Entertainer, Mike Epps, Gabrielle Union	United States	
How Much Do You Love Me?	Bertrand Blier	Monica Bellucci, Bernard Campan, Gérard Depardieu	France; Italy	Romantic comedy
I Am a Sex Addict	Caveh Zahedi	Caveh Zahedi, Rebecca Lord, Emily Morse	United States	
Ice Princess	Tim Fywell	Joan Cusack, Kim Cattrall, Michelle Trachtenberg, Hayden Panettiere	United States	Sports comedy-drama
The Ice Harvest	Harold Ramis	John Cusack, Billy Bob Thornton, Connie Nielsen	United States	
In Her Shoes	Curtis Hanson	Cameron Diaz, Toni Collette, Shirley MacLaine	United States	Comedy-drama
In the Mix	Ron Underwood	Usher, Emmanuelle Chriqui, Chazz Palminteri	United States	
Junebug	Phil Morrison	Amy Adams, Embeth Davidtz, Benjamin McKenzie	United States	Comedy-drama
Just Friends	Roger Kumble	Ryan Reynolds, Amy Smart, Anna Faris	United States	
Just like Heaven	Mark S. Waters	Reese Witherspoon, Mark Ruffalo, Donal Logue	United States	Fantasy-Romantic comedy
Kicking & Screaming	Jesse Dylan	Will Ferrell, Robert Duvall, Mike Ditka	United States	
King and the Clown	Lee Joon-ik	Gam Woo-seong, Jung Jin-young, Lee Joon-ik	South Korea	Comedy-drama
King's Ransom	Jeff Byrd	Anthony Anderson, Jay Mohr, Kellita Smith	United States	
Kinky Boots	Julian Jarrold	Joel Edgerton, Chiwetel Ejiofor, Sarah-Jane Potts	United Kingdom	
Kiss Kiss Bang Bang	Shane Black	Robert Downey Jr., Val Kilmer, Michelle Monaghan	United States	
The League of Gentlemen's Apocalypse	Steve Bendelack	Mark Gatiss, Steve Pemberton, Reece Shearsmith	United Kingdom; United States	Horror comedy
Linda Linda Linda	Nobuhiro Yamashita	Aki Maeda, Bae Doona, Shiori Sekine	Japan	Comedy-drama
The Longest Yard	Peter Segal	Adam Sandler, Chris Rock, Burt Reynolds	United States	
Madagascar	Eric Darnell, Tom McGrath	Ben Stiller, Chris Rock, David Schwimmer, Jada Pinkett Smith, Sacha Baron Cohen, Cedric the Entertainer, Andy Richter	United States	Family-oriented comedy
The Man	Les Mayfield	Samuel L. Jackson, Eugene Levy, Luke Goss	United States	
Man of the House	Stephen Herek	Tommy Lee Jones, Cedric the Entertainer, Christina Milian	United States	
Man with the Screaming Brain	Bruce Campbell	Bruce Campbell, Antoinette Byron, Jonas Talkington	United States	Science fiction comedy
The Matador	Richard Shepard	Pierce Brosnan, Greg Kinnear, Hope Davis	United States	Crime comedy
Me and You and Everyone We Know	Miranda July	John Hawkes, Miranda July, Miles Thompson	United States; United Kingdom	Comedy-drama
Monster-in-Law	Richard Shepard	Jennifer Lopez, Jane Fonda, Michael Vartan	United States	
Mr. & Mrs. Smith	Doug Liman	Brad Pitt, Angelina Jolie, Vince Vaughn	United States	Action comedy
Miss Congeniality 2: Armed and Fabulous	John Pasquin	Sandra Bullock, Regina King, Enrique Murciano Jr.	United States	
Must Love Dogs	Gary David Goldberg	Diane Lane, John Cusack, Elizabeth Perkins	United States	Romantic comedy
Mutual Appreciation	Andrew Bujalski	Justin Rice, Rachel Clift, Andrew Bujalski	United States	
Nanny McPhee	Kirk Jones	Emma Thompson, Colin Firth, Angela Lansbury	United Kingdom; United States	Fantasy comedy-drama
Never Been Thawed	Sean Anders	Allen Zwolle, Shelly Frasier, Sean Anders	United States	
The Pacifier	Adam Shankman	Lauren Graham, Vin Diesel, Faith Ford	United States	
The Perfect Man	Mark Rosman	Hilary Duff, Heather Locklear, Chris Noth	United States	Romantic comedy
Pervert!	Jonathan Yudis	Mary Carey, Darrell Sandeen, Sean Andrews	United States	Horror comedy
The President's Last Bang	Im Sang-soo	Han Suk-kyu, Baek Yoon-sik, Song Jae-ho	South Korea	
Pretty Persuasion	Marcos Siega	Evan Rachel Wood, Ron Livingston, James Woods	United States	
The Producers	Susan Stroman	Nathan Lane, Matthew Broderick, Uma Thurman	United States	Musical comedy
Rebound	Steve Carr	Martin Lawrence, Wendy Raquel Robinson, Breckin Meyer	United States	
Return of the Living Dead: Rave to the Grave	Ellory Elkayem	Jenny Mollen, Cory Hardrict, John Keefe, Aimee-Lynn Chadwick, Peter Coyote	United States	Horror comedy
The Ringer	Barry W. Blaustein	Johnny Knoxville, Brian Cox, Katherine Heigl	United States	
Robots	Chris Wedge		United States	Animated science fiction family-oriented comedy
Rumor Has It...	Rob Reiner	Jennifer Aniston, Kevin Costner, Shirley MacLaine	United States	Romantic comedy
Russian Dolls	Cédric Klapisch	Romain Duris, Audrey Tautou, Cécile De France	France; United Kingdom	Comedy-drama
Shopgirl	Anand Tucker	Steve Martin, Claire Danes, Jason Schwartzman	United States	Comedy-drama
Shut Up and Shoot Me	Steen Agro	Karel Roden, Andy Nyman, Anna Geislerová	Czech Republic; United Kingdom	
Sky High	Mike Mitchell	Michael Angarano, Kurt Russell, Kelly Preston	United States	
Son of the Mask	Lawrence Guterman	Jamie Kennedy, Alan Cumming, Liam Falconer	United States	
Southern Belles	Paul S. Myers, Brennan Shroff	Anna Faris, Laura Breckenridge, Justin Chambers	United States	
Stewie Griffin: The Untold Story	Pete Michels, Peter Shin		United States	
Summer in Berlin	Andreas Dresen	Inka Friedrich, Nadja Uhl, Andreas Schmidt	Germany	
Takeshis'	Takeshi Kitano	Takeshi Kitano, Kotomi Kyono, Kayoko Kishimot	Japan	Comedy-drama
Thank You for Smoking	Jason Reitman	Aaron Eckhart, Maria Bello, Cameron Bright	United States	
The Thing About My Folks	Raymond de Felitta	Peter Falk, Paul Reiser, Elizabeth Perkins	United States	Comedy-drama
Tokyo Zombie	Sakichi Sato	Tadanobu Asano, Sho Aikawa, Kazuo Umezu	Japan	Horror comedy
Transamerica	Duncan Tucker	Felicity Huffman, Kevin Zegers, Fionnula Flanagan	United States	Comedy-drama
Underclassman	Marcos Siega	Nick Cannon, Angelo Spizzirri, Cheech Marin	United States	
Waiting...	Rob McKittrick	Ryan Reynolds, Anna Faris, Justin Long	United States	
Wallace & Gromit: The Curse of the Were-Rabbit	Steve Box, Nick Park		United Kingdom	Stop-motion animated film
The Weather Man	Gore Verbinski	Nicolas Cage, Michael Caine, Hope Davis	United States	Comedy-drama
Wedding Crashers	David Dobkin	Owen Wilson, Vince Vaughn, Christopher Walken	United States	
The Wedding Date	Clare Kilner	Debra Messing, Dermot Mulroney, Amy Adams	United States	Romantic comedy
Yours, Mine and Ours	Raja Gosnell	Dennis Quaid, Rene Russo, Rip Torn	United States	
Meet the Family	Stan Lerner	Jennifer Alden, Alisa Banks	United States	

== 2006 ==
Title	Director	Cast	Country	Notes
10 Items or Less	Brad Silberling	Morgan Freeman, Paz Vega, Bobby Cannavale	United States	Comedy-drama
12:08 East of Bucharest	Corneliu Porumboiu	Mircea Andreescu, Teo Corban, Ion Sapdaru	Romania	
Aachi & Ssipak	Joe Bum-Jim		South Korea	
Accepted	Steve Pink	Justin Long, Jonah Hill, Adam Herschman	United States	
American Dreamz	Paul Weitz	Dennis Quaid, Hugh Grant, Mandy Moore	United States	
The Ant Bully	John A. Davis	Zach Tyler Eisen, Julia Roberts, Nicolas Cage, Meryl Streep, Paul Giamatti, Regina King	United States	Family-oriented comedy
Art School Confidential	Terry Zwigoff	Max Minghella, Sophia Myles, John Malkovich	United States	Comedy-drama
Avenue Montaigne	Danièle Thompson	Cécile De France, Valérie Lemercier, Albert Dupontel	France	
Bandidas	Joachim Roenning, Espen Sandberg	Salma Hayek, Penélope Cruz, Steve Zahn	France; Mexico; United States	Western action-comedy
Barnyard	Steve Oedekerk	Kevin James, Courteney Cox, Sam Elliott, Danny Glover, Wanda Sykes, Andie MacDowell	United States	Family-oriented comedy
Beerfest	Jay Chandrasekhar	Jay Chandrasekhar, Kevin Heffernan, Steve Lemme	United States	
Behind the Mask: The Rise of Leslie Vernon	Scott Glosserman	Nathan Baesel, Angela Goethals, Robert Englund	United States	Horror comedy
The Benchwarmers	Dennis Dugan	Rob Schneider, David Spade, Jon Heder	United States	
Big Momma's House 2	John Whitesell	Martin Lawrence, Nia Long, Zachary Levi	United States	
Black Sheep	Jonathan King	Nathan Meister, Peter Feeney, Danielle Mason	New Zealand	Horror comedy
Borat	Larry Charles	Sacha Baron Cohen, Ken Davitian, Jane Sanguinetti Luenell	United States	
The Boss of It All	Lars von Trier	Jens Albinus, Peter Gantzler, Fridrik Thór Fridriksson	Denmark; France; Italy; Sweden	
The Bothersome Man	Jens Lien	Trond Fausa Aurvag, Petronella Barker, Per Schaaning	Norway	Fantasy comedy, horror comedy
The Break-Up	Peyton Reed	Vince Vaughn, Jennifer Aniston, Joey Lauren Adams	United States	Romantic comedy-drama
Les Bronzés 3: Amis pour la vie	Patrice Leconte	Josiane Balasko, Michel Blanc, Marie-Anne Chaze	France	
Caffeine	John Cosgrove	Mena Suvari, Marsha Thomason, Katherine Heigl	United States	
Cars	John Lasseter, Joe Ranft	Owen Wilson, Paul Newman, Larry the Cable Guy, Bonnie Hunt, Tony Shalhoub	United States	Animated film
Cashback	Sean Ellis	Sean Biggerstaff, Emilia Fox, Shaun Evans	United Kingdom	Comedy-drama
Clerks II	Kevin Smith	Brian O'Halloran, Jeff Anderson, Rosario Dawson	United States	
Click	Frank Coraci	Adam Sandler, Kate Beckinsale, Christopher Walken	United States	
Church Ball	Kurt Hale	Fred Willard, Andrew Wilson, Clint Howard	United States	
The Darwin Awards	Finn Taylor	Joseph Fiennes, Winona Ryder, Tim Blake Nelson	United States	
Dasepo Naughty Girls	E J-yong	Kim Ok-vin, Park Jin-woo, Lee Kyeon	South Korea	Musical comedy
Date Movie	Aaron Seltzer	Alyson Hannigan, Adam Campbell, Sophie Monk	United States	
Ice Age: The Meltdown	Carlos Saldanha	Ray Romano, John Leguizamo, Denis Leary, Seann William Scott, Queen Latifah	United States	Animated adventure comedy
The Devil Wears Prada	David Frankel	Meryl Streep, Anne Hathaway, Emily Blunt	United States	Comedy-drama
Dikkenek	Olivier Van Hoofstadat	Marion Cotillard, Dominique Pinon, Jean-Luc Couchard	France; Belgium	
Employee of the Month	Gregory Coolidge	Dane Cook, Jessica Simpson, Dax Shepard	United States	
The Family Friend	Paolo Sorrentino	Giacomo Rizzo, Fabrizio Bentivoglio, Laura Chiatti	Italy; France	Black comedy
Fido	Andrew Currie	Andrew Currie, Jan Skorzewski, Kevin Tyell	Canada	
Find Me Guilty	Sidney Lumet	Vin Diesel, Peter Dinklage, Linus Roache	United States	Comedy-drama
Flushed Away	David Bowers, Sam Fell	Hugh Jackman, Kate Winslet, Jean Reno	United Kingdom; United States	Family-oriented comedy
The Foot Fist Way	Jody Hill	Danny McBride, Mary Jane Bostic, Ben Best	United States	
For Your Consideration	Christopher Guest	Bob Balaban, Christopher Guest, Jennifer Coolidge	United States	
Friends with Money	Nicole Holofcener	Jennifer Aniston, Joan Cusack, Catherine Keener, Frances McDormand, Jason Isaacs, Scott Caan, Simon McBurney	United Kingdom; United States	Comedy-drama
Funny Money	Leslie Greif	Chevy Chase, Penelope Ann Miller, Armand Assante, Christopher McDonald	United States	
Garfield: A Tail of Two Kitties	Tim Hill	Bill Murray, Tim Curry, Breckin Meyer, Jennifer Love Hewitt, Billy Connolly	United States	
Grandma's Boy	Nicholaus Goossen	Linda Cardellini, Allen Covert, Peter Dante	United States	
Happy Feet	George Miller	Elijah Wood, Robin Williams, Brittany Murphy, Hugh Jackman, Nicole Kidman, Hugo Weaving	Australia; United States	Adventure family-oriented comedy
The History Boys	Nicholas Hytner	Richard Griffiths, Frances de la Tour, Stephen Campbell Moore	United Kingdom; United States	Comedy-drama
The Holiday	Nancy Meyers	Cameron Diaz, Kate Winslet, Jude Law	United States	Romantic comedy
Hood of Horror	Stacy Title	Snoop Dogg, Ernie Hudson, Danny Trejo	United States	Horror comedy
Hoodwinked	Cory Edwards	Anne Hathaway, Patrick Warburton, Glenn Close, Jim Belushi, Anthony Anderson, David Ogden Stiers	United States	Family-oriented comedy
Idiocracy	Mike Judge	Luke Wilson, Maya Rudolph, Dax Shepard	United States	
Jackass Number Two	Jeff Tremaine	Johnny Knoxville, Steve-O, Chris Pontius	United States	
John Tucker Must Die	Betty Thomas	Jesse Metcalfe, Brittany Snow, Ashanti, Sophia Bush, Arielle Kebbel	United States	
Just My Luck	Donald Petrie	Lindsay Lohan, Chris Pine, Samaire Armstrong	United States	
Kettle of Fish	Claudia Myers	Matthew Modine, Gina Gershon, Christy Scott Cashman	United States	Romantic comedy
Larry the Cable Guy: Health Inspector	Trent Cooper	Larry the Cable Guy, Iris Bahr, Bruce Bruce	United States	
Let's Go to Prison	Bob Odenkirk	Will Arnett, Dax Shepard, Chi McBride	United States	
Lies & Alibis	Matt Checkowski, Kurt Mattila	Steve Coogan, Rebecca Romijn, Selma Blair	United States	
Lights in the Dusk	Aki Kaurismäki	Janne Hyytiäinen, Ilkka Koivula, Maria Järvenhelmi	Finland; Germany; France	Comedy-drama
Little Man	Keenen Ivory Wayans	Marlon Wayans, Shawn Wayans, Kerry Washington, John Witherspoon	United States	
Little Miss Sunshine	Jonathan Dayton, Valerie Faris	Greg Kinnear, Toni Collette, Steve Carell	United States	Comedy-drama
Love and Other Disasters	Alek Keshishian	Brittany Murphy, Santiago Cabrera, Matthew Rhys	United Kingdom	Romantic comedy
Madea's Family Reunion	Tyler Perry	Tyler Perry, Blair Underwood, Lynn Whitfield	United States	Comedy-drama
Man of the Year	Barry Levinson	Robin Williams, Laura Linney, Christopher Walken	United States	
My Super Ex-Girlfriend	Ivan Reitman	Uma Thurman, Luke Wilson, Anna Faris	United States	
Nacho Libre	Jared Hess	Jack Black, Héctor Jimenez, Ana de la Reguera	United States	
Night at the Museum	Shawn Levy	Ben Stiller, Robin Williams, Carla Gugino, Dick Van Dyke	United States	
The Night of the White Pants	Amy Talkington	Tom Wilkinson, Nick Stahl, Selma Blair	United States	Comedy-drama
No Mercy for the Rude	Park Chul-Hee	Shin Ha-kyun, Yoon Ji-hye	South Korea	
Open Season	Roger Allers, Jill Culton, Anthony Stacchi	Martin Lawrence, Ashton Kutcher, Debra Messing	United States	Family-oriented comedy
OSS 117: Cairo, Nest of Spies	Michel Hazanavicius	Jean Dujardin, Bérénice Bejo, Aure Atika	France	
Over the Hedge	Tim Johnson, Karey Kirkpatrick	Bruce Willis, Garry Shandling, Allison Janney, Steve Carell, Wanda Sykes	United States	Family-oriented comedy
The Pink Panther	Shawn Levy	Steve Martin, Kevin Kline, Beyonce Knowles, Jean Reno	United States	
Pirates of the Caribbean: Dead Man's Chest	Gore Verbinski	Johnny Depp, Orlando Bloom, Keira Knightley	United States	Adventure fantasy comedy
A Prairie Home Companion	Robert Altman	Garrison Keillor, Meryl Streep, Lily Tomlin	United States	
Priceless	Pierre Salvadori	Audrey Tautou, Gad Elmaleh, Marie-Christine Adam	France	Romantic comedy
Puff, Puff, Pass	Mekhi Phifer	Mekhi Phifer, Danny Masterson, Mo Collins	United States	
RV	Barry Sonnenfeld	Robin Williams, Cheryl Hines, Joanna "JoJo" Levesque, Josh Hutcherson, Will Arnett, Jeff Daniels, Kristin Chenoweth	United States	
The Santa Clause 3: The Escape Clause	Michael Lembeck	Tim Allen, Elizabeth Mitchell, Martin Short	United States	
Scary Movie 4	David Zucker	Anna Faris, Regina Hall, Craig Bierko	United States	
The Science of Sleep	Michel Gondry	Gael García Bernal, Charlotte Gainsbourg, Alain Chabat	France; Italy	Fantasy comedy
Scoop	Woody Allen	Woody Allen, Hugh Jackman, Scarlett Johansson	United States	Romantic crime comedy
Seven Days of Grace	Don E. FauntLeRoy	Stephanie Beacham, Lesley-Anne Down, Olivia Hussey, Gavan O'Herlihy, Frank Campanella, Stephen Furst	United States	Comedy-drama
Severance	Christopher Smith	Danny Dyer, Laura Harris, Tim McInnerny	United Kingdom; Germany	Horror comedy
The Shaggy Dog	Brian Robbins	Tim Allen, Robert Downey Jr., Kristin Davis	United States	Family-oriented comedy, fantasy comedy
She's the Man	Andy Fickman	Amanda Bynes, Channing Tatum, Laura Ramsey	United States	
Shortbus	John Cameron Mitchell	Sook-Yin Lee, Paul Dawson, Lindsay Beamish	United States	
Slither	James Gunn	Nathan Fillion, Elizabeth Banks, Gregg Henry	United States	Horror comedy
Stick It	Jessica Bendinger	Jeff Bridges, Missy Peregrym, Vanessa Lengies	United States	Comedy-drama
Stranger than Fiction	Marc Forster	Will Ferrell, Maggie Gyllenhaal, Dustin Hoffman	United States	Comedy-drama
Talladega Nights: The Ballad of Ricky Bobby	Adam McKay	Will Ferrell, John C. Reilly, Sacha Baron Cohen	United States	
Tenacious D in The Pick of Destiny	Liam Lynch	Jack Black, Kyle Gass, JR Reed	United States	
Venus	Roger Michell	Peter O'Toole, Leslie Phillips, Jodie Whittaker	United Kingdom	Comedy-drama
Waiter	Alex Van Warmerdam		Netherlands	
Wristcutters: A Love Story	Goran Dukic	Patrick Fugit, Shannyn Sossamon, Shea Whigham	United States	
You, Me and Dupree	Anthony Russo, Joe Russo	Owen Wilson, Kate Hudson, Matt Dillon	United States	
Zoom	Peter Hewitt	Tim Allen, Courteney Cox, Chevy Chase	United States	

== 2007 ==
Title	Director	Cast	Country	Notes
Alvin and the Chipmunks	Tim Hill	Justin Long, Matthew Gray Gubler, Jesse McCartney, Cameron Richardson	United States	
American Pie Presents: The Naked Mile	Joe Nussbaum	John White, Jessy Schram, Steve Talley, Christopher McDonald, Eugene Levy	United States	
Aqua Teen Hunger Force Colon Movie Film for Theaters	Matt Maiellaro, Dave Willis	Dana Snyder, Carey Means, Mike Schatz, Andy Merrill	United States	Animated film
Are We Done Yet?	Steve Carr	Ice Cube, Nia Long, John C. McGinley, Philip Daniel Bolden	United States	
Balls of Fury	Ben Garant	Dan Fogler, Christopher Walken, George Lopez, Maggie Q	United States	
Because I Said So	Michael Lehmann	Diane Keaton, Mandy Moore, Lauren Graham, Piper Perabo	United States	
Bee Movie	Simon J. Smith, Steve Hickner	Jerry Seinfeld, Renée Zellweger, Matthew Broderick, Patrick Warburton	United States	Animated film
Blades of Glory	Josh Gordon, Will Speck	Will Ferrell, Jon Heder, Will Arnett, Amy Poehler, William Fichtner, Jenna Fischer, Craig T. Nelson	United States	
Chennai 600028	Venkat Prabhu	Jai, Shiva, Premji, Aravind Akash, Nithin Sathya, Ajay Raj, Ranjith, Vijay Vasanth, Prasanna, Inigo Prabakaran, Karthik, Arun, Vijayalakshmi, Kristine Zedek, Sampath Raj	India	
Catch and Release	Susannah Grant	Jennifer Garner, Timothy Olyphant, Kevin Smith, Sam Jaeger	United States	Romantic comedy
Chaos Theory	Marcos Siega	Ryan Reynolds, Stuart Townsend, Emily Mortimer, Sarah Chalke, Mike Erwin	United States	Comedy-drama
Code Name: The Cleaner	Les Mayfield	Lucy Liu, Cedric the Entertainer, Nicolette Sheridan, DeRay Davis, Tom Butler	United States	Action comedy
The Comebacks	Tom Brady	David Koechner, Carl Weathers, Melora Hardin, Brooke Nevin, Andy Dick	United States	
Daddy Day Camp	Fred Savage	Cuba Gooding Jr., Paul Rae, Lochlyn Munro, Richard Gant	United States	
Dan in Real Life	Peter Hedges	Steve Carell, Alison Pill, Juliette Binoche, Dane Cook, Dianne Wiest	United States	Comedy-drama
The Darjeeling Limited	Wes Anderson	Owen Wilson, Adrien Brody, Jason Schwartzman, Anjelica Huston	United States	
Delta Farce	C. B. Harding	Larry the Cable Guy, Bill Engvall, DJ Qualls, Danny Trejo, Keith David	United States	
Enchanted	Kevin Lima	Amy Adams, Patrick Dempsey, James Marsden, Timothy Spall	United States	Fantasy comedy
Epic Movie	Jason Friedberg	Kal Pen, Adam Campbell, Jennifer Coolidge, Jayma Mays, Crispin Glover, Fred Willard	United States	
Evan Almighty	Tom Shadyac	Steve Carell, Morgan Freeman, Lauren Graham, John Goodman, Wanda Sykes, Jonah Hill	United States	
Hairspray	Adam Shankman	John Travolta, Michelle Pfeiffer, Christopher Walken, Amanda Bynes, James Marsden, Queen Latifah, Brittany Snow, Zac Efron	United States	Musical comedy
The Heartbreak Kid	Farrelly Brothers	Ben Stiller, Malin Akerman, Michelle Monaghan, Jerry Stiller, Scott Wilson	United States	
Hot Fuzz	Edgar Wright	Simon Pegg, Nick Frost	United States; United Kingdom; France	
I Could Never Be Your Woman	Amy Heckerling	Michelle Pfeiffer, Paul Rudd, Saoirse Ronan, Tracey Ullman	United States	Romantic comedy
I Now Pronounce You Chuck and Larry	Dennis Dugan	Adam Sandler, Kevin James, Jessica Biel, Ving Rhames, Steve Buscemi, Dan Aykroyd, John Farley	United States	
Italian Spiderman	Dario Russo	David Ashby, Carmine Russo, Leombruno Tosca, Susanna Dekker	Australia	
Juno	Jason Reitman	Elliot Page, Michael Cera, Jennifer Garner, Jason Bateman, Allison Janney, J. K. Simmons	United States	Comedy-drama
Kickin' It Old Skool	Harvey Glazer	Jamie Kennedy, Maria Menounos, Michael Rosenbaum, Miguel A. Núñez Jr., Christopher McDonald	United States	
Knocked Up	Judd Apatow	Seth Rogen, Katherine Heigl, Paul Rudd, Leslie Mann, Jason Segel, Jay Baruchel, Jonah Hill, Martin Starr	United States	
License to Wed	Ken Kwapis	Robin Williams, Mandy Moore, John Krasinski, Christine Taylor, Eric Christian Olsen	United States	
Life Kills Me	Sebastián Silva	Diego Muñoz, Amparo Noguera, Gabriel Díaz	Chile	Comedy-drama
Meet Bill	Bernie Goldmann	Aaron Eckhart, Jessica Alba, Elizabeth Banks, Timothy Olyphant, Logan Lerman	United States	
Meet the Robinsons	Stephen Anderson	Jordan Fry, Wesley Singerman, Harland Williams, Tom Kenny, Steve Anderson, Angela Bassett, Laurie Metcalf, Adam West, Tom Selleck, Nicole Sullivan	United States	Animated film
Mr. Bean's Holiday	Steve Bendelack	Rowan Atkinson, Emma de Caunes, Max Baldry, Willem Dafoe, Karel Roden, Jean Rochefort	United States; United Kingdom; France	
Mr. Magorium's Wonder Emporium	Zach Helm	Dustin Hoffman, Natalie Portman, Jason Bateman, Zach Mills	United States; Canada	Fantasy comedy
Mr. Woodcock	Craig Gillespie	Billy Bob Thornton, Seann William Scott, Susan Sarandon, Ethan Suplee, Amy Poehler	United States	
Music and Lyrics	Marc Lawrence	Hugh Grant, Drew Barrymore, Kristen Johnston, Brad Garrett, Haley Bennett	United States	Romantic comedy
No Reservations	Scott Hicks	Catherine Zeta-Jones, Aaron Eckhart, Abigail Breslin, Patricia Clarkson	United States	Romantic comedy-drama
Norbit	Brian Robbins	Eddie Murphy, Thandie Newton, Terry Crews, Cuba Gooding Jr., Eddie Griffin, Katt Williams, Clifton Powell, Marlon Wayans	United States	
Ocean's Thirteen	Steven Soderbergh	George Clooney, Brad Pitt, Matt Damon, Andy Garcia, Don Cheadle, Bernie Mac, Ellen Barkin, Al Pacino	United States	
Pirates of the Caribbean: At World's End	Gore Verbinski	Johnny Depp, Orlando Bloom, Keira Knightley, Geoffrey Rush, Bill Nighy	United States	Adventure fantasy comedy
Ratatouille	Brad Bird	Patton Oswalt, Ian Holm, Lou Romano, Janeane Garofalo, Brad Garrett, Brian Dennehy, Peter Sohn	United States	Animated film
Reno 911!: Miami	Robert Ben Garant	Carlos Alazraqui, Mary Birdsong, Niecy Nash	United States	
Rush Hour 3	Brett Ratner	Jackie Chan, Chris Tucker, Hiroyuki Sanada, Youki Kudoh, Max von Sydow	United States, France	Action comedy
Shrek the Third	Chris Miller	Mike Myers, Eddie Murphy, Cameron Diaz, Antonio Banderas, Julie Andrews, John Cleese, Rupert Everett, Eric Idle, Justin Timberlake	United States	Animated film
The Simpsons Movie	David Silverman	Dan Castellaneta, Julie Kavner, Nancy Cartwright, Yeardley Smith, Hank Azaria, Harry Shearer, Albert Brooks	United States	Animated film
Smokin' Aces	Joe Carnahan	Ben Affleck, Jason Bateman, Common, Andy Garcia, Alicia Keys, Ray Liotta, Jeremy Piven, Ryan Reynolds	United States; United Kingdom; France	
Superbad	Greg Mottola	Jonah Hill, Michael Cera, Seth Rogen, Bill Hader, Martha MacIsaac, Christopher Mintz-Plasse	United States	
Surf's Up	Ash Brannon, Chris Buck	Shia LaBeouf, Jeff Bridges, Zooey Deschanel, Jon Heder, James Woods, Mario Cantone, Diedrich Bader	United States	Animated film
The Ten	David Wain	Jessica Alba, Winona Ryder, Paul Rudd, Justin Theroux, Famke Janssen, Adam Brody, Gretchen Mol, Liev Schreiber, Ken Marino	United States	
Viva	Anna Biller	Anna Biller, Jared Sanford	United States	
Waitress	Adrienne Shelly	Keri Russell, Nathan Fillion, Cheryl Hines, Jeremy Sisto, Andy Griffith, Adrienne Shelly	United States	Comedy-drama

== 2008 ==
Title	Director	Cast	Country	Notes
27 Dresses	Anne Fletcher	Katherine Heigl, James Marsden, Malin Akerman, Judy Greer	United States	Romantic comedy
The Accidental Husband	Griffin Dunne	Uma Thurman, Jeffrey Dean Morgan, Colin Firth, Isabella Rossellini, Sam Shepard	United States	Romantic comedy
Angus, Thongs and Perfect Snogging	Gurinder Chadha	Georgia Groome, Alan Davies, Karen Taylor, Aaron Johnson, Eleanor Tomlinson	United States	Romantic comedy
Another Cinderella Story	Damon Santostefano	Selena Gomez, Drew Seeley, Jane Lynch	United States	Teen musical comedy
Assassination of a High School President	Brett Simon	Reece Thompson, Mischa Barton, Bruce Willis, Michael Rapaport, Kathryn Morris	United States	
Asterix at the Olympic Games	Frédéric Forestier, Thomas Langmann	Gérard Depardieu, Clovis Cornillac, Benoît Poelvoorde, Alain Delon, Vanessa Hessler, Franck Dubosc	France	Fantasy comedy
Baby Mama	Michael McCullers	Tina Fey, Amy Poehler, Greg Kinnear, Dax Shepard, Romany Malco, Steve Martin	United States	
Be Kind Rewind	Michael Gondry	Jack Black, Mos Def, Danny Glover, Mia Farrow, Melanie Diaz, Irv Gooch, Chandler Park	United States	
Bedtime Stories	Adam Shankman	Adam Sandler, Laura Ann Kesling, Jonathan Morgan Heit, Courteney Cox, Guy Pearce, Richard Griffiths, Jonathan Pryce, Russell Brand	United States	Fantasy comedy
Beverly Hills Chihuahua	Raja Gosnell	Drew Barrymore, Andy García, George Lopez, Plácido Domingo Edward James Olmos Paul Rodriguez, Cheech Marin, Luis Guzman, Piper Perabo, Manolo Cardona, Jamie Lee Curtis, José María Yazpik	United States	
Bolt	Chris Williams, Byron Howard	John Travolta, Miley Cyrus, Susie Essman, Mark Walton, Malcolm McDowell, James Lipton, Greg Germann	United States	Animated film
Burn After Reading	Coen brothers	George Clooney, Frances McDormand, John Malkovich, Tilda Swinton, Richard Jenkins, Brad Pitt	United States	
Camp Rock	Matthew Diamond	Demi Lovato, The Jonas Brothers, Meaghan Martin, Maria Canals-Barrera, Daniel Fathers, Alyson Stoner, Jasmine Richards	United States	Musical comedy-drama
CJ7	Stephen Chow	Stephen Chow, Xu Jiao, Zhang Yuqi	Hong Kong	Science fiction/comedy-drama
College	Deb Hagen	Drake Bell, Kevin Covais, Andrew Caldwell, Haley Bennett, Ryan Pinkston, Nick Zano, Gary Owen	United States	
College Road Trip	Roger Kumble	Raven-Symoné, Martin Lawrence, Donny Osmond, Brenda Song, Will Sasso, Kym Whitley, Arnetia Walker	United States	
Definitely, Maybe	Adam Brooks	Ryan Reynolds, Abigail Breslin, Isla Fisher, Derek Luke, Elizabeth Banks, Rachel Weisz, Kevin Kline	United States	Romantic comedy
Disaster Movie	Jason Friedberg and Aaron Seltzer	Matt Lanter, Vanessa Minnillo, Gary "G Thang" Johnson, Nicole Parker, Crista Flanagan, Kim Kardashian, Ike Barinholtz, Carmen Electra, Tony Cox	United States	
Drillbit Taylor	Steven Brill	Owen Wilson, Nate Hartley, Troy Gentile, David Dorfman, Alex Frost, Leslie Mann, Danny McBride, Josh Peck	United States	
Easy Virtue	Stephan Elliott	Jessica Biel, Colin Firth, Kristin Scott Thomas, Ben Barnes	United Kingdom	
Extreme Movie	Adam Jay Epstein, Andrew Jacobson	Michael Cera, Ryan Pinkston, Jamie Kennedy, Chris Cooper, Frankie Muniz, Matthew Lillard, Rob Pinkston, Ben Feldman, Kevin Hart	United States	
Finding Amanda	Peter Tolan	Matthew Broderick, Brittany Snow, Peter Facinelli, Maura Tierney, Steve Coogan, Daniel Roebuck, Bill Fagerbakke, J.P. Manoux, Jennifer Hall	United States	Comedy-drama
First Sunday	David E. Talbert	Ice Cube, Tracy Morgan, Katt Williams, Loretta Devine, Michael Beach, Keith David, Regina Hall, Malinda Williams, Chi McBride	United States	
Fly Me to the Moon	Ben Stassen	Trevor Gagnon, Philip Daniel Bolden, David Gore, Christopher Lloyd, Kelly Ripa, Nicollette Sheridan, Tim Curry, Ed Begley Jr., Adrienne Barbeau, Robert Patrick	United States	Animated film
Fool's Gold	Andy Tennant	Matthew McConaughey, Kate Hudson, Kevin Hart, Donald Sutherland, Ewen Bremner, Alexis Dziena, Ray Winstone, Brian Hooks, Malcolm-Jamal Warner, Michael Mulheren	United States	Action romantic comedy
Forgetting Sarah Marshall	Nicholas Stoller	Jason Segel, Mila Kunis, Kristen Bell, Russell Brand, Jonah Hill, Bill Hader	United States	
Four Christmases	Seth Gordon	Vince Vaughn, Reese Witherspoon, Robert Duvall, Jon Favreau, Mary Steenburgen, Dwight Yoakam, Tim McGraw, Kristin Chenoweth, Jon Voight, Sissy Spacek	United States	
Get Smart	Peter Segal	Steve Carell, Anne Hathaway, Dwayne Johnson, Alan Arkin, Terence Stamp, James Caan, Terry Crews, David Koechner, Masi Oka, Nate Torrence, Ken Davitian, David S. Lee	United States	Action comedy
Ghost Town	David Koepp	Ricky Gervais, Téa Leoni, Greg Kinnear, Billy Campbell, Kristen Wiig, Dana Ivey	United States	Fantasy comedy
Hancock	Peter Berg	Will Smith, Jason Bateman, Charlize Theron, Eddie Marsan, Jae Head	United States	Action comedy
Happy-Go-Lucky	Mike Leigh	Sally Hawkins, Eddie Marsan, Alexis Zegerman, Sylvestra Le Touzel, Samuel Roukin	United Kingdom	Comedy-drama
Harold & Kumar Escape from Guantanamo Bay	Jon Hurwitz, Hayden Schlossberg	John Cho, Kal Penn, Danneel Harris, Roger Bart, Rob Corddry, Eric Winter, Neil Patrick Harris	United States	
Henry Poole Is Here	Mark Pellington	Luke Wilson, Radha Mitchell, Adriana Barraza, Cheryl Hines, George Lopez, Richard Benjamin	United States	Comedy-drama
Horton Hears a Who!	Jimmy Hayward, Steve Martino	Jim Carrey, Steve Carell, Amy Poehler, Carol Burnett, Will Arnett, Seth Rogen, Dan Fogler, Selena Gomez, Isla Fisher, Jesse McCartney	United States	Animated film
The Hottie and the Nottie	Tom Putnam	Joel David Moore, Paris Hilton, Christine Lakin, The Greg Wilson, Marianne Muellerleile, Johann Urb	United States	Romantic comedy
The House Bunny	Fred Wolf	Anna Faris, Colin Hanks, Emma Stone, Kat Dennings, Katharine McPhee, Rumer Willis, Kiely Williams, Dana Goodman, Kimberly Makkouk, Christopher McDonald, Beverly D'Angelo	United States	
How to Lose Friends and Alienate People	Robert B. Weide	Simon Pegg, Kirsten Dunst, Megan Fox, Danny Huston, Gillian Anderson, Jeff Bridges	United Kingdom, United States	
Igor	Robert B. Weide	John Cusack, Molly Shannon, Steve Buscemi, Sean Hayes, Eddie Izzard, Jennifer Coolidge, Jay Leno	United States	Animated film
Immigrants	Robert B. Weide	Hank Azaria, Eric McCormack	Hungary, United States	Animated film
In Bruges	Martin McDonagh	Colin Farrell, Brendan Gleeson, Ralph Fiennes, Clémence Poésy, Jérémie Renier	United States	Comedy-drama crime thriller
Jack and Jill vs. the World	Vanessa Parise	Freddie Prinze Jr., Taryn Manning, Robert Forster, Vanessa Parise, Kelly Rowan, Peter Stebbings	United States, Canada	Romantic comedy
Kung Fu Panda	John Stevenson, Mark Osborne	Jack Black, Dustin Hoffman, Angelina Jolie, Ian McShane, Seth Rogen, Lucy Liu, David Cross, Randall Duk Kim, Jackie Chan	United States	Animated film
The Love Guru	Marco Schnabel	Mike Myers, Jessica Alba, Justin Timberlake, Romany Malco, Megan Good, Verne Troyer, Telma Hopkins	United States	
Mad Money	Callie Khouri	Diane Keaton, Queen Latifah, Katie Holmes	United States	
Madagascar: Escape 2 Africa	Eric Darnell, Tom McGrath	Ben Stiller, Chris Rock, Jada Pinkett Smith, David Schwimmer, Sacha Baron Cohen, Bernie Mac, Sherri Shepard, Alec Baldwin, will.i.am	United States	Animated film
Made of Honor	Paul Weiland	Patrick Dempsey, Michelle Monaghan, Kevin McKidd, Kathleen Quinlan, Sydney Pollack	United States	Romantic comedy
Mamma Mia!	Phyllida Lloyd	Amanda Seyfried, Meryl Streep, Pierce Brosnan, Colin Firth, Stellan Skarsgård, Julie Walters, Dominic Cooper, Christine Baranski	United States	Musical romantic comedy
Marley & Me	David Frankel	Owen Wilson, Jennifer Aniston, Eric Dane, Alan Arkin, Haley Hudson, Haley Bennett	United States	Comedy-drama
Meet Dave	Brian Robbins	Eddie Murphy, Gabrielle Union, Ed Helms, Kevin Hart, Pat Kilbane, Miguel A. Núñez Jr, Elizabeth Banks, Scott Caan, Marc Blucas, Yvette Nicole Brown, Mike O'Malley	United States	Science fiction comedy
Meet the Spartans	Jason Friedberg and Aaron Seltzer	Sean Maguire, Carmen Electra, Ken Davitian, Kevin Sorbo, Travis Van Winkle, Jareb Dauplaise, Diedrich Bader, Nicole Parker, Ike Barinholtz, Phil Morris	United States	
Miss Pettigrew Lives for a Day	Bharat Nalluri	Amy Adams, Frances McDormand, Lee Pace, Ciarán Hinds, Shirley Henderson, Tom Payne, Mark Strong	United States	
My Best Friend's Girl	Howard Deutch	Dane Cook, Kate Hudson, Jason Biggs, Diora Baird, Alec Baldwin, Lizzy Caplan	United States	
My Mom's New Boyfriend	George Gallo	Colin Hanks, Meg Ryan, Antonio Banderas	United States	Romantic comedy
My Sassy Girl	Yann Samuell	Elisha Cuthbert, Jesse Bradford	United States	Romantic comedy
Nick and Norah's Infinite Playlist	Peter Sollett	Michael Cera, Kat Dennings, Alexis Dziena, Ari Graynor, Aaron Yoo, Jay Baruchel	United States	Comedy-drama
Nim's Island	Jennifer Flackett, Mark Levin	Jodie Foster, Abigail Breslin, Gerard Butler	United States	Adventure comedy
Open Season 2	Matthew O'Callaghan, Todd Wilderman	Mike Epps, Joel McHale, Jane Krakowski, Billy Connolly, Cody Cameron, Maddie Taylor, Crispin Glover	United States	Animated film
Over Her Dead Body	Jeff Lowell	Eva Longoria, Lake Bell, Paul Rudd, Jason Biggs	United States	
Paris	Cédric Klapisch	Juliette Binoche, Romain Duris, Fabrice Luchini	France	Comedy-drama
Picture This!	Stephen Herek	Ashley Tisdale, Kevin Pollak, Robbie Amell	United States	
Pineapple Express	David Gordon Green	Seth Rogen, Dave Franco, Gary Cole, Rosie Perez, Danny McBride, Kevin Corrigan, Craig Robinson	United States	Action comedy
Private Valentine: Blonde & Dangerous	Steve Miner	Jessica Simpson, Vivica A. Fox, Ryan Sypek, Olesya Rulin, Cheri Oteri, Jill Marie Jones, Keiko Agena	United States	
Remembering Phil	Brian Smith	Nicholas Turturro, Christina Murphy, Joanne Kelly, Steve Valentine, Dan Castellaneta	United States	
The Rocker	Peter Cattaneo	Rainn Wilson, Christina Applegate, Jeff Garlin, Josh Gad, Teddy Geiger, Emma Stone	United States	
Role Models	David Wain	Seann William Scott, Paul Rudd, Christopher Mintz-Plasse, Bobb'e J. Thompson, Jane Lynch, Elizabeth Banks	United States	
Run, Fatboy, Run	David Schwimmer	Simon Pegg, Thandie Newton, Hank Azaria, Dylan Moran, Harish Patel	United Kingdom, United States	
Semi-Pro	Kent Alterman	Will Ferrell, Woody Harrelson, André Benjamin, Maura Tierney, Will Arnett, David Koechner	United States	
Sex and the City: The Movie	Michael Patrick King	Sarah Jessica Parker, Kim Cattrall, Cynthia Nixon, Kristin Davis	United States	Romantic comedy-drama
Sex Drive	Sean Anders	Josh Zuckerman, Amanda Crew, Clark Duke	United States	
Shred	David Mitchell	Tom Green, Dave England, Carlo Marks	Canada	
Smart People	Noam Murro	Dennis Quaid, Sarah Jessica Parker, Elliot Page, Thomas Haden Church	United States	Comedy-drama
Snow Buddies	Robert Vince	Skyler Gisondo, Jimmy Bennett, Josh Flitter, Henry Hodges, Liliana Mumy, Tom Everett Scott, Molly Shannon, Kris Kristofferson, Jim Belushi, Paul Rae	United States	
Space Chimps	Kirk DeMicco	Andy Samberg, Cheryl Hines, Patrick Warburton, Jeff Daniels, Kristin Chenoweth, Stanley Tucci	United States	Animated film
Step Brothers	Adam McKay	Will Ferrell, John C. Reilly, Mary Steenburgen, Richard Jenkins	United States	
Strange Wilderness	Fred Wolf	Steve Zahn, Allen Covert, Jonah Hill, Kevin Heffernan, Ashley Scott, Peter Dante	United States	
Strictly Sexual	Joel Viertel	Amber Benson, Johann Urb, Kristen Kerr, Stevie Long, Trevor Murphy	United States	
Superhero Movie	Craig Mazin	Drake Bell, Sara Paxton, Christopher McDonald, Leslie Nielsen, Kevin Hart, Brent Spiner, Jeffrey Tambor, Robert Joy, Regina Hall, Pamela Anderson, Simon Rex	United States	Superhero parody
Surfer, Dude	S.R. Bindler	Matthew McConaughey, Alexie Gilmore, Scott Glenn, Jeffrey Nordling, Willie Nelson, Woody Harrelson, Sarah Wright	United States	
Tropic Thunder	Ben Stiller	Ben Stiller, Robert Downey Jr., Jack Black, Danny McBride, Nick Nolte, Tom Cruise	United States	
Vicky Cristina Barcelona	Woody Allen	Javier Bardem, Patricia Clarkson, Penélope Cruz, Kevin Dunn, Rebecca Hall, Scarlett Johansson, Chris Messina	United States	Romantic comedy-drama
The Wackness	Jonathan Levine	Ben Kingsley, Josh Peck, Famke Janssen	United States	Comedy-drama
WALL-E	Andrew Stanton	Ben Burtt, Elissa Knight, Jeff Garlin, Fred Willard, John Ratzenberger, Kathy Najimy	United States	Animated science fiction romantic comedy-drama
War, Inc.	Joshua Seftel	John Cusack, Hilary Duff, Marisa Tomei, Joan Cusack, Shirley Brener	United States	
Welcome Home Roscoe Jenkins	Malcolm D. Lee	Martin Lawrence, James Earl Jones, Margaret Avery, Joy Bryant, Michael Clarke Duncan, Mo'Nique, Nicole Ari Parker, Cedric the Entertainer, Mike Epps	United States	
What Happens in Vegas	Tom Vaughan	Ashton Kutcher, Cameron Diaz, Rob Corddry, Lake Bell, Treat Williams, Dennis Miller	United States	
What Just Happened	Barry Levinson	Robert De Niro, Catherine Keener, Robin Wright Penn	United States	Comedy-drama
Wieners	Mark Steilen	Fran Kranz, Kenan Thompson, Darrel Hammond, Andy Milonakis, Mindy Sterling, Jenny McCarthy	United States	
Wild Child	Nick Moore	Emma Roberts, Natasha Richardson, Shirley Henderson, Alex Pettyfer, Aidan Quinn, Juno Temple	United States, United Kingdom	
The Women	Diane English	Meg Ryan, Annette Bening, Eva Mendes, Debra Messing, Jada Pinkett Smith, Carrie Fisher, Cloris Leachman, Debi Mazar, Bette Midler	United States	Comedy-drama
Yes Man	Peyton Reed	Jim Carrey, Zooey Deschanel, Bradley Cooper	United States	
You Don't Mess with the Zohan	Dennis Dugan	Adam Sandler, John Turturro, Emmanuelle Chriqui, Lainie Kazan, Nick Swardson, Lainie Kazan, Alec Mapa, Rob Schneider	United States	
Zack and Miri Make a Porno	Kevin Smith	Seth Rogen, Elizabeth Banks, Craig Robinson, Jason Mewes, Traci Lords	United States	
Opium War	Siddiq Barmak	Peter Bussian, Joe Suba, Fawad Samani	Afghanistan	Tragicomedy
Sunday	Rohit Shetty	Ajay Devgan, Ayesha Takia	India	Comedy thriller

== 2009 ==
- 17 Again
- 18-Year-Old Virgin
- (500) Days of Summer
- Aadhavan
- Adopted
- Aliens in the Attic
- Alvin and the Chipmunks: The Squeakquel
- Adventureland
- All About Actresses
- All About Steve
- American Pie Presents: The Book of Love
- Away We Go
- Baby on Board
- Balls Out: Gary the Tennis Coach
- Bandslam
- Beeswax
- The Boat That Rocked
- Bride Wars
- Brüno
- City Rats
- Cloudy with a Chance of Meatballs
- Confessions of a Shopaholic
- Couples Retreat
- Dance Flick
- De Dana Dan
- Dead Hooker in a Trunk
- Endless Bummer
- Evil Bong 2: King Bong
- Extract
- Falling Up
- Fanboys
- Fantastic Mr. Fox
- Funny People
- Gentlemen Broncos
- G-Force
- Ghosts of Girlfriends Past
- Good Hair
- The Hangover
- Hannah Montana: The Movie
- Happy Ever Afters
- He's Just Not That Into You
- Ho Ho Ho
- Hotel for Dogs
- I Hate Valentine's Day
- I Love You, Beth Cooper
- I Love You, Man
- I Love You, Phillip Morris
- Ice Age: Dawn of the Dinosaurs
- Imagine That
- Inglourious Basterds
- The Invention of Lying
- Janky Promoters
- Julie & Julia
- Labor Pains
- Land of the Lost
- The Last Lovecraft: Relic of Cthulhu
- Madea Goes to Jail
- The Maid
- Main Aurr Mrs Khanna
- The Men Who Stare at Goats
- A Midsummer Night's Party
- Miss March
- Monsters vs. Aliens
- My Life in Ruins
- My Year Without Sex
- New in Town
- Night at the Museum: Battle of the Smithsonian
- Observe and Report
- Old Dogs
- Opposite Day
- Paa
- Paper Heart
- Paper Man
- Paul Blart: Mall Cop
- The Pink Panther 2
- Planet 51
- Post Grad
- The Princess and the Frog
- Princess Protection Program
- The Proposal
- Serious Moonlight
- Skills Like This
- The Slammin' Salmon
- Taking Woodstock
- The Ugly Truth
- Up
- Up in the Air
- Without a Paddle: Nature's Calling
- Women in Trouble
- World's Greatest Dad
- Year One
- Zombieland

== United Kingdom films ==
- About a Boy (2002)
- Ali G Indahouse (2002)
- Anuvahood (2011)
- Bend It Like Beckham (2002)
- Billy Elliot (2000)
- Birthday Girl (2001)
- Blackball (2003)
- Bridget Jones: The Edge of Reason (2004)
- Bridget Jones's Diary (2001)
- Calendar Girls (2003)
- Chicken Run (2000)
- A Cock and Bull Story (2006)
- Confetti (2006)
- Fishtales (2007)
- Grow Your Own (2007)
- Happy-Go-Lucky (2008)
- Hot Fuzz (2007)
- It's All Gone Pete Tong (2004)
- Johnny English (2003)
- Keeping Mum (2005)
- Kevin & Perry Go Large (2000)
- Kinky Boots (2005)
- The League of Gentlemen's Apocalypse (2005)
- Love Actually (2003)
- Lucky Break (2001)
- Magicians (2007)
- Mr. Bean's Holiday (2007)
- Mr. Magorium's Wonder Emporium (2007)
- Mrs Henderson Presents (2005)
- The Parole Officer (2001)
- Relative Values (2000)
- Seeing Double (2003)
- Sex Lives of the Potato Men (2004)
- Shaun of the Dead (2004)
- Snatch (2000)
- Wallace & Gromit: The Curse of the Were-Rabbit (2005)
- Wimbledon (2005)

== Sci-fi-comedy films ==
- Aachi & Ssipak (2006)
- The Adventures of Pluto Nash (2002)
- Aqua Teen Hunger Force Colon Movie Film for Theaters (2007)
- Diabolical Tales (2005)
- Dude, Where's My Car? (2000)
- Evolution (2001)
- G.O.R.A. (2004)
- The Hitchhiker's Guide to the Galaxy (2005)
- Illegal Aliens (2006)
- Lilo & Stitch (2002)
- The Lost Skeleton of Cadavra (2001)
- Man with the Screaming Brain (2005)
- Men in Black II (2002)
- Nutty Professor II: The Klumps (2000)
- Star Wreck: In the Pirkinning (2005)
- Zenon: The Zequel (2001)
- Zenon: Z3 (2003)

== Comedy-horror ==
2002

- Bloody Mallory

2003

- Gory Gory Hallelujah

2004

- Choking Hazard
- Club Dread
- Dead & Breakfast
- Hide and Creep
- The Hollow
- SARS Wars
- Satan's Little Helper
- Seed of Chucky
- Shaun of the Dead
- To Catch a Virgin Ghost
- Tremors 4: The Legend Begins
- Zombie Honeymoon

2005

- Boy Eats Girl
- Buppah Rahtree Phase 2: Rahtree Returns
- Die You Zombie Bastards!
- Doll Graveyard
- Pervert!
- Return of the Living Dead: Necropolis
- Return of the Living Dead 5: Rave to the Grave

2006

- Big Bad Wolf
- Black Sheep
- Dead and Deader
- Evil Bong
- Fido
- Frostbite
- The Gingerdead Man
- Hatchet
- Severance
- Slither

2007

- Ghost Station
- Long Pigs
- Netherbeast Incorporated
- Super Deluxe shorts
- Terror Toons 2: The Sick and Silly Show

2008

- The Cottage
- Dance of the Dead
- Gutterballs
- I Sell the Dead
- ThanksKilling
- Tokyo Gore Police
- Zombie Strippers

2009

- Evil Bong 2: King Bong
- Jennifer's Body
- The Last Lovecraft: Relic of Cthulhu
- Lesbian Vampire Killers
- Strigoi

== Comedy-drama ==
- About Schmidt (2002)
- Adaptation. (2002)
- All About Actresses (2009)
- Almost Famous (2000)
- Bandits (2001)
- Beeswax (2009)
- Between Love and Hate (2006)
- Big Fish (2003)
- Billy Elliot (2000)
- Bonjour Monsieur Shlomi (2003)
- The Chumscrubber (2005)
- City Rats (2009)
- Click (2006)
- Daltry Calhoun (2005)
- Death at a Funeral (2007)
- The Devil Wears Prada (2005)
- Diary of a Mad Black Woman (2005)
- Divine Secrets of the Ya-Ya Sisterhood (2002)
- Duets (2000)
- Dummy (2002)
- The Family Stone (2005)
- The Fighting Temptations (2003)
- Garden State (2004)
- Hanging Up (2000)
- Happy Feet (2006)
- Happy-Go-Lucky (2008)
- Holes (2003)
- Jersey Girl (2004)
- The Last Supper (2003)
- Lights in the Dusk (2006)
- Like a Virgin (2006)
- Little Miss Sunshine (2006)
- Made (2001)
- The Maid (2009)
- Main Aurr Mrs Khanna (2009)
- The Man Without a Past (2002)
- Melinda and Melinda (2004)
- Miracle on 1st Street (2007)
- My Year Without Sex (2009)
- Paa (2009)
- The Royal Tenenbaums (2001)
- Song Man (2009)
- Stranger than Fiction (2006)
- Two Weeks (2006)
- Va savoir (2001)
- The Weather Man (2005)

== Parody films ==
- 2001: A Space Travesty (2000)
- Adopted
- An American Carol (2008)
- Austin Powers in Goldmember (2002)
- Black Dynamite (2009)
- The Comebacks (2007)
- Dance Flick (2009)
- Date Movie (2006)
- Disaster Movie (2008)
- Epic Movie (2007)
- Farce of the Penguins (2007)
- George of the Jungle 2 (2003)
- The Hebrew Hammer (2003)
- Johnny English (2003)
- Man of the Year (2006)
- Meet the Spartans (2008)
- My Big Fat Independent Movie (2005)
- Not Another Teen Movie (2001)
- The Onion Movie (2008)
- The Producers (2005)
- Scary Movie (2000)
- Scary Movie 2 (2001)
- Scary Movie 3 (2003)
- Scary Movie 4 (2006)
- Superhero Movie (2008)
- Tropic Thunder (2008)
