= List of horror films of 2005 =

A list of horror films released in 2005.

Horror films released in 2005
Title	Director	Cast	Country	Notes
2001 Maniacs	Tim Sullivan	Robert Englund, Lin Shaye, Giuseppe Andrews, Christa Campbell	United States	
All Souls Day: Dia de los Muertos	Jeremy Kasten	Laz Alonso, Danny Trejo, Marisa Ramirez	United States	
An American Haunting	Courtney Solomon	Sissy Spacek, Donald Sutherland, Rachel Hurd-Wood	United States	
The Amityville Horror	Andrew Douglas	Ryan Reynolds, Melissa George, Jesse James	United States	
Andre the Butcher	Philip Cruz	Maury Sterling, Ron Jeremy, Heather Joy Budner	United States	
Art of the Devil 2	Pasith Buranajan, Kongkiat Khomsiri, Isara Nadee, Seree Phongnithi, Yosapong Polsap, Putipong Saisikaew, Art Thamthrakul	Napakpapha Nakprasitte, Hataiwan Ngamsukonpusit, Chanida Suriyakompon	Thailand	
Attack of the Sabretooth	George T. Miller	Elizabeth Cooke, Raine Brown, Caitlyn Darr	United States	
Aunt Rose	James Tucker	Raine Brown, Christine D'Amato, Frank Franconeri	United States	
Bad Reputation	Jim Hemphill	Angelique Hennessy, Jerad Anderson, Jennifer Holloway	United States	
The Beast of Bray Road	Leigh Scott	Joel Hebner, Sarah Lieving, Tom Nagel	United States	
BloodRayne	Uwe Boll	Kristanna Loken, Ben Kingsley, Billy Zane	Germany	Vampire film
The Bonesetter Returns	Brett Kelly	Mark Courneyea, Thea Nikolic, Jody Haucke	Canada	Direct-to-video
Boogeyman	Stephen Kay	Barry Watson, Emily Deschanel, Skye McCole Bartusiak	United States	
The Booth	Yoshihiro Nakamura	Maiko Asano, Makoto Ashikawa, Hijiri Kojima	Japan	
Boy Eats Girl	Stephen Bradley	Tadhg Murphy, Samantha Mumba, Laurence Kinlan	Ireland	
The Butcher	Edward Gorsuch	Hazell Dean, Bill Jacobson, Annie Mackay	United States	
The Call of Cthulhu	Andrew H. Leman	Andra Carlson, Mike Dalager	United States	
Camp Daze	Alex Pucci	Jillian Swanson, Ikaika Kahoano, Jessica Sonneborn	United States	
The Cave	Bruce Hunt	Cole Hauser, Morris Chestnut, Eddie Cibrian	United States	
The Cavern	Olatunde Osunsanmi	Sybil Temtchine, Andres Hudson, Ogy Durham	United States	
Cello	Lee Woo-cheol	Hyeon-a Seong, Jin Woo, Ho-bin Jeong	South Korea	
Cold and Dark	Andrew Goth	Luke Goss, Cassandra Bell, Hamish Hamilton	United States	
Constantine	Francis Lawrence	Keanu Reeves, Rachel Weisz, Tilda Swinton	United States	Supernatural horror
Creature from the Hillbilly Lagoon	Richard Griffin	Sal Lizard, Tanith Fiedler, Patrick Pitu	United States	
Cruel World	Kelsey T. Howard	Sanoe Lake, Edward Furlong, Nicole Bilderback	United States	
Cry_Wolf	Jeff Wadlow	Julian Morris, Lindy Booth, Jared Padalecki	United States	
The Curse of El Charro	Rich Ragsdale	Danny Trejo, Drew Mia, Andrew Bryniarski	United States	
Cursed	Wes Craven	Christina Ricci, Joshua Jackson, Jesse Eisenberg	United States	
D' Anothers	Joyce E. Bernal	Vhong Navarro, Toni Gonzaga,	Philippines	Horror Comedy
The Dark	John Fawcett	Maria Bello, Sean Bean, Maurice Roëves	Denmark; United Kingdom	
Dark Remains	Brian Avenet-Bradley	Cheri Christian, Michelle Kegley, Rachel Jordan	United States	
Dark Water	Walter Salles	Jennifer Connelly, John C. Reilly, Tim Roth	United States	
DeadHouse	Pablo Macho Maysonet IV, Brian Rivera	Anthony Alicea, Ryan Israel, Jose Ortiz Jr.	United States	
Death Tunnel	Philip Adrian Booth	Steffany Huckaby, Gary Wolf, Yolanda Pecoraro	United States	
Demon Hunter	Scott Ziehl	Sean Patrick Flannery, Colleen Porch, Billy Drago	United States	
The Descent	Neil Marshall	Shauna MacDonald, Natalie Mendoza, Alex Reid	United Kingdom	
The Devil's Rejects	Rob Zombie	Sid Haig, Bill Moseley, Sheri Moon Zombie	United States	
Die You Zombie Bastards!	Caleb Emerson	Hasil Adkins, Sadie Blades, Sandra Kennedy	United States	Direct-to-video
Doll Graveyard	Charles Band	Jared Kusnitz, Kristyn Green, Scott Seymour	United States	Direct-to-video
Dominion: Prequel to the Exorcist	Paul Schrader	Stellan Skarsgård, Gabriel Mann, Clara Bellar	United States	
Doom	Andrzej Bartkowiak	Karl Urban, The Rock	Czech Republic; Germany; United Kingdom; United States	
Dr. Rage	Jeff Broadstreet	Denice Duff, Andrew Divoff, Karen Black	United States	Direct-to-video
Dream Home	Amir Valinia	Mia X, Pat Delune, Chantelle Winchester	United States	
Evil Aliens	Jake West	Jamie Honeybourne, Emily Booth, Tim Daniel Clark	United Kingdom	
The Exorcism of Emily Rose	Scott Derrickson	Laura Linney, Tom Wilkinson, Jennifer Carpenter	United States	
Exterminator City	Clive Cohen	Lilith Stabs, Fernbomb, Taylor Wayne	United States	Science fiction horror
The Eye 10	Oxide Pang Chun, Danny Pang	Wilson Chen, Kate Yeung, Isabella Leong, Bongkoj Khongmalai, Ray MacDonald, Kris Gu	Hong Kong; Thailand	
The Fallen Ones	Kevin VanHook	Navid Negahban, Kristen Miller, Casper Van Dien	United States	
Filthy McNastiest	Chris Seaver		United States	
The Fog	Rupert Wainwright	Tom Welling, Maggie Grace, Rade Serbedzija	United States	
Forest of the Damned	Johannes Roberts	Tom Savini, Nicole Petty	United States	
Fragile	Jaume Balagueró	Calista Flockhart, Richard Roxburgh, Elena Anaya	Spain	
The Gingerdead Man	Charles Band	Gary Busey, Robin Sydney, Larry Cedar	United States	
Grayson Arms	Michael Feifer	Jennifer Carpenter, Todd Babcock, Stacey Dash	United States	
Haunted Boat	Olga Levens	Sarah Scott, Travis Hammer, Courtney Scheuerman	United States	
Headhunter	Paul Tarantino	René Ashton, Mark Aiken, Krista Carpenter	United States	
Headspace	Andrew van den Houten	Olivia Hussey, Larry Fessenden, Dee Wallace	United States	
Hellraiser: Deader	Rick Bota	Doug Bradley, Kari Wuhrer, Paul Rhys, Simon Kunz	United States	
Hellraiser: Hellworld	Rick Bota	Lance Henriksen, Katheryn Winnick, Doug Bradley	United States	Direct-to-video
Hide and Seek	John Polson	Dakota Fanning, Robert De Niro	United States	
Hollywood Horror	Bernt Amadeus Capra	Natalia Cigliuti, Tia Mowry, Tamera Mowry, Christopher Berry, Jimmy Bridges, Todd Bridges, Cory Hardrict	United States	
Hostel	Eli Roth	Jay Hernandez, Derek Richardson, Eythor Gudjonsson	United States	
House of Wax	Jaume Collet-Serra	Elisha Cuthbert, Chad Michael Murray, Brian Van Holt, Paris Hilton	United States	
Intermedio	Andrew Lauer	Cerina Vincent, Edward Furlong, Steve Railsback	United States	
Insecticidal	Jeffery Scott Lando	Meghan Heffern, Rhonda Dent, Travis Watters, Shawn Bachynsk	Canada	
Invasion	Albert Pyun	Jenny Dare Paulin, Norbert Weisser, Laurie O'Brien	United States	
Isolation	Billy O'Brien	John Lynch, Essie Davis, Marcel Iures	United States	
It Waits	Steven R. Monroe	Tinsel Korey, Sean Wei Mah, Cerina Vincent	United States	
Jolly Roger: Massacre at Cutter's Cove	Gary Jones	Rhett Giles, Kristina Korn, Tom Nagel	United States	
Kakurenbo	Shuhei Morita		Japan	Anime film
Killer Bash	David DeCoteau	Raquel Riskin, Sebastian Gacki, Caz Odin Darko	Canada	
Komodo vs. Cobra	Jay Andrews	Michael Paré, Ted Monte, Roark Critchlow	United States	
Land of the Dead	George A. Romero	Simon Baker, John Leguizamo, Asia Argento	United States; Canada	
Larva	Tim Cox	Vincent Ventresca, Rachel Hunter, William Forsythe	United States	
Legion of the Dead	Paul Bales	Courtney Clonch, Claudia Lynx, Bruce Boxleitner	United States	
Lie Still	Sean Hogan	Stuart Laing, Susan Engel, Nina Sosanya	United Kingdom	
Locusts: The 8th Plague	Ian Gilmour	Dan Cortese, Julie Benz, David Keith	United States	
Man-Thing	Brett Leonard	Robert Mammone, Jack Thompson, Rachael Taylor	United States	
The Mangler Reborn	Matt Cunningham, Erik Gardner	Aimee Brooks, Reggie Bannister	United States	Direct-to-video
Mantra	Raviranjan Maitra	Rajatava Dutta, Locket Chatterjee, Sabyasachi Chakravarthy, Biswajit Chakraborty, Soumitra Chatterjee	India	
Meatball Machine	Yūdai Yamaguchi, Jur'ichi Yamamoto	Issei Takahashi, Aoba Kawai, Kenichi Kawasaki	Japan	Science fiction
Mortuary	Tobe Hooper	Denise Crosby, Alexandra Adi, Courtney Peldon	United States	
Naina	Shripal Morakhia	Rahul Nath, Anuj Sawhney, Shweta Konnur	United States	
The Neighbor No. Thirteen	Yasou Inoue	Shun Oguri	Japan	
Nightmare	Dylan Bank	Jason Scott Campbell, Nicole Roderick	United States	
One Missed Call 2	Renpei Tsukamoto		Japan	
Pervert!	Jonathan Yudis	Juliette Clarke, Sean Andrew, Mary Carey	United States	
Raging Sharks	Danny Lerner	Corin Nemec, Vanessa Angel, Corbin Bernsen	Bulgaria; United States	
The Red Shoes	Kim Yong-gyun	Kim Hye-soo, Kim Sung-soo, Park Yeon-ah	South Korea	
Reincarnation	Takashi Shimizu	Yūka, Karina, Kippei Shiina, Tetta Sugimoto,	Japan	
Reeker	Dave Payne	Michael Ironside, Arielle Kebbel, Eric Mabius	United States	
Return of the Living Dead: Necropolis	Ellory Elkayem	Aimee-Lynn Chadwick, Peter Coyote, Jana Kramer	United States	
Return of the Living Dead: Rave to the Grave	Ellory Elkayem	Peter Coyote, Jenny Mollen, Cory Hardrict	United States	
The Ring Two	Hideo Nakata	Chazel Napiza, James Belleza, David Dorfman	United States	
Safety in Numbers	David Douglas	Dichen Lachman, Teo Gebert, Gabriella Maselli	Australia	
Saw II	Darren Lynn Bousman	Donnie Wahlberg, Shawnee Smith, Tobin Bell	United States	
Severed: Forest of the Dead		J.R. Bourne, Sage Brocklebank, Leanne Adachi	United States	
Shadow: Dead Riot	Derek Wan	Misty Mundae, Tony Todd, Moet Meira	United States	
Shapeshifter	Gregory Lemkin	Jennifer Lee Wiggins, Ocean Marciano, Chris Facey	United States	
The Shunned	C.M. Downs	Kurt Hanover, Adam Gaitan, Deb Keeney	United States	
Silent Scream	Matt Cantu, Lance Kawas	Melissa Schuman, Shanti Lowry, Scott Vickaryous	United States	
The Skeleton Key	Iain Softley	Kate Hudson	United States	
Song of the Dead	Chip Gubera		United States	
Tamara	Jeremy Haft	Jenna Dewan, Katie Stuart, Chad Faust	United States	
Tokyo Zombie	Sakichi Satô	Shô Aikawa, Erika Okuda, Tadanobu Asano	Japan	
Tomie: Beginning		Rio Matsumoto, Kenji Mizuhashi, Asami Imajuku	Japan	
Tomie: Revenge	Ataru Oikawa		Japan	
Trespassers	Ian McCrudden	Kaiwi Lyman, Brendan McIvor Fleming, Joleigh Fioravanti	Mexico; United States	
Urban Legends: Bloody Mary	Mary Lambert	Kate Mara, Ed Marinaro, Tina Lifford	United States	
Vampire Conspiracy	Marc Morgenstern	Jean-Marc Fontaine, Sarah Boes, Zena Driver	Canada	
The Veil	Richard Chance	John Chance, Martin Dorkins, Michael Himsworth	United Kingdom	
Venom	Jim Gillespie	Agnes Bruckner, Rick Cramer, Bijou Phillips	United States	
Voice	Choi Ik-Hwan	Kim Ok-vin, Seo Ji-hye	South Korea	
Voodoo Moon	Kevin VanHook	Charisma Carpenter, Jeffrey Combs, Eric Mabius	United States	
The Wig	Won Shin-yun	Chae Min-seo, Yoo Sun, Sa Hyeon-jin	South Korea	
Woensdag	Bob Embregts, Jean-Paul Arends	Reine Rek, Ronald van den Burg, Marisa Goedhart	Netherlands	
Wolf Creek	Greg McLean	John Jarratt, Cassandra Magrath, Kestie Morassi, Nathan Phillips	Australia	
The Woodland Haunting 2	Dennis Baker	Kayla Marie Mortenson, Cortney Palm, Scott Cray	United States	
Zombie-American	Nick Poppy	Ed Helms, Seth Poppy, Anne Harris	United States	Horror comedy
