= Mike Davis (screenwriter) =

American screenwriter

- Born: United States
- Occupation: Screenwriter

Mike Davis is an American screenwriter, director and film archivist. He was born and raised in Philadelphia, Pennsylvania and optioned his first screenplay, the story of Elvis Presley returning from the grave to become president, shortly after graduating NYU's Tisch School of the Arts.

In 2004 he formed Stag Films, writing and co-producing the independent feature film, Pervert! starring Mary Carey, an homage to Russ Meyer, 1970s exploitation horror films and sexploitation films. Davis has worked with writer/director Matt Piedmont, contributing to comedy segments created by Piedmont for Bud TV, Funny or Die and Comedy Central.

Davis's directorial debut Sex Galaxy was created entirely out of recycled stock and public domain footage, primarily from the 1968 film Voyage to the Planet of Prehistoric Women, which in turned borrowed heavily from Planeta Bur. It screened on the international film festival circuit, winning two "Best Feature" awards and one for "Best Drinking Movie," and was released by Breaking Glass Pictures and Unearthed Films in 2008. Due to its "recycling" of copyright-free stock footage, Davis has dubbed it the world's first "green movie."

Davis followed with another "green movie," the horror/comedy/political satire President Wolfman, about the U.S. president being bitten by a werewolf and terrorizing the streets of Washington. President Wolfman culled much of its footage from The Werewolf of Washington starring Dean Stockwell, in addition to over one hundred other film sources. The movie won many festival awards, including Best Feature, Audience Choice and Best Script, and is distributed by Wild Eye Releasing on VHS and DVD, released in 2014.

He has contributed his archival research skills to many film and television productions, including "American Made," "Midsommar" and "Armageddon Time," and for director Jonas Åkerlund on his music documentaries "Billy Idol Should be Dead" and "Metallica Saved My Life."

2025 saw a new "green movie" release by Davis entitled Dead, White and Blue. The film, a political satire action comedy, uses over three hundred film sources, mostly public domain footage produced by the United States Government, Department of Defense and law enforcement agencies. The storyline involves a rogue FBI agent who enlists the US Army to defeat the KKK, who have developed a shrink ray to help absolve a racist cop in the murder of an innocent black man. The movie won several film festival awards, including Best Feature, Best Underground Film, Best Experimental Film and Best Editing.

He also wrote the screenplay for the film Aloha Santa.
