= Darrell Sandeen =

American actor

- Born: July 13, 1930; Chicago, Illinois, U.S.
- Died: January 22, 2009 (aged 78); Los Angeles, California, U.S.
- Occupation: Actor

Darrell Sandeen (July 13, 1930 – January 22, 2009) was a character actor who specialized in playing menacing or offbeat people. Perhaps his best-known role was as corrupt cop "Buzz" Meeks in L.A. Confidential.

Sandeen started as a stage actor on Broadway, appearing in the original casts of Young Abe Lincoln, Can-Can, Here's Love, a revival of Guys and Dolls, A Joyful Noise, and The Fig Leaves are Falling. He can be heard on three cast albums. He also appeared in the national touring companies of The Great White Hope, Li'l Abner, and My Fair Lady.

Moving to Hollywood, he appeared on such television shows as Bonanza and Route 66. He was featured in L.A. Confidential, Blazing Saddles, and They Call Me Bruce?. Sandeen continued acting until shortly before his death; later roles included appearing as a possible conspirator in the Kennedy assassination in Interview with the Assassin, playing opposite porn star Mary Carey in Pervert!, and playing Homeless Al in String Theory. Sandeen remained active in theatre as part of the Musical Theatre Guild in Los Angeles.

Sandeen died on January 22, 2009, of complications following a stroke.

== Filmography ==
Year	Title	Role	Notes
1974	Blazing Saddles	KKK Man	Uncredited
1982	They Call Me Bruce?	Trigger	
1997	L.A. Confidential	Leland "Buzz" Meeks	
2001	The Education of a Vampire	Professor Lazlo	
2002	Interview with the Assassin	John Seymour Sr.	
2002	String Theory	Al "Homeless Al"	
2005	Pervert!	Hezekiah	
2011	Satin	Rudy Shep	(final film role)
