= Shapeshifter (film) =

- DVD cover
- Directed by: Gregory Lemkin
- Written by: Gregory Lemkin; A. Everett Howe
- Produced by: David Michael Latt; David Rimawi; Sherri Strain
- Starring: Jennifer Lee Wiggins; Ocean Marciano; Chris Facey; Vaz Andreas; Marat Glazer; Thomas Downey; Joel Ezra Hebner
- Cinematography: Andrew Shulkind
- Edited by: Jaron Whitfill
- Music by: Scott Bruzenak; Ariel Westberg
- Distributed by: The Asylum
- Release date: 2005
- Running time: 81 minutes
- Country: United States
- Language: English

Shapeshifter is a 2005 American supernatural horror film created by the independent film group The Asylum. It was directed by Gregory Lemkin who also co-wrote the film.

== Plot ==
Inmates and guards alike become trapped in a maximum security prison when they fall prey to a demonic beast that feeds on human flesh. As the creature's power multiplies with every kill, their only chance for survival is to uncover the ancient mystery that holds the power of the shapeshifter.

== Release ==
Shapeshifter was released on DVD by The Asylum Home Entertainment on November 29, 2005.

== Reception ==
Jon Condit from Dread Central panned the film, awarding it a score of one out of five. In his review, Condit criticized the film's lack of originality, weak characters, and slow pacing; calling it "a thoroughly dull demonic monster in a prison flick almost completely devoid of energy or imagination."
