= Pervert! =

- Directed by: Jonathan Yudis
- Written by: Mike Davis
- Produced by: Jonathan Yudis
- Starring: Mary Carey; Sean Andrews; Darrell Sandeen
- Cinematography: Guy Livneh
- Edited by: Michael T. Fitzgerald Jr. Fitz
- Music by: Elliott Goldkind; Matt Piedmont
- Distributed by: TLA Releasing
- Release date: February 12, 2005
- Running time: 81 minutes
- Country: United States
- Language: English

Pervert! is a 2005 American comedy horror film directed by Jonathan Yudis. It is mainly a tribute to the films of Russ Meyer.

== Plot ==
College student James (Andrews) arrives from New Orleans at a desert ranch owned by his father, Hezekiah (Sandeen) to help out. Soon after arriving, James is hit on by Hezekiah's wife, Cheryl (Carey), and starts having nightmares. James and Cheryl are caught by Hezekiah having sex, Cheryl and Hezekiah have a fight, then she leaves the ranch that night.

Hezekiah drives into town and picks up another woman, Alisha (Sally Jean), who also quickly falls for James then disappears. Cheryl staggers into Hezekiah's "studio" (an art workshop where he makes female body sculptures out of meat), and dies in front of James. He takes her into the house, where he finds his father crying over Alisha's dead body.

James calls a care facility because he thinks his dad has gone crazy. They send out a nurse, Patty (Clarke), who handcuffs Hezekiah to his bed so that the next time somebody is killed, he can be eliminated as a suspect. In the few days of waiting for the next victim to show up, Patty and James decide to spend the time by having sex.

James reveals to Patty that he went to a witch doctor (Johnson) back in New Orleans to help him with attracting females but was misled; his penis can now detach itself from his body and kill people.

A side story involves a sexually confused local mechanic (Yudis, the film's producer and director) and his probably intentional delay in fixing James's car, in order to seduce him.

== Cast ==
- Sean Andrews as James
- Darrell Sandeen as Hezekiah
- Juliette Clarke as Patty
- Sally Jean as Alisha
- Mary Carey as Cheryl
- Jonathan Yudis as Mechanic
- Tula as Hitchhiker
- Candice Hussain as Marissa
- Malik Carter as Narrator
- Edmund Johnson as Witch Doctor
- Lucia as Montage Babe
- Aurelie Sanchez as Coyote
- William Yudis as Baby Mechanic
- Jason Consoli as Frat Boy
- Andy Curtain as Frat Boy
- John Brotherton as Frat Boy
- Derek Berg as College Student
- Ren Trostle as College Student
- Ryan Johnsen as College Student
- Demetrius Markus as College Student
- Victoria Bakshi|Victoria Yudis as Dazzling Woman
- Stephanie Jane Markham as Additional voices

== Release ==
In the French version of the DVD, another short film titled Bloody Current Exchange by the French director Romain Basset is included as a hidden bonus. The film was part of the inaugural "Boobs and Blood International Film Festival" Sept. 25 2010 at the New Beverly Cinema in Los Angeles.

== Reception ==
CineMagazine rated the film 1 star.
