= G-Sale =

- Directed by: Randy Nargi
- Written by: Randy Nargi
- Produced by: Jessi Badami
- Starring: Jessi Badami; Scott Burns; Tracey Conway
- Distributed by: Bogwood Films
- Release date: January 28, 2003 (Sarasota Film Festival)
- Running time: 77 minutes
- Country: United States
- Language: English

G-Sale is a 2003 mockumentary film about garage sales and the people who are obsessed by them. The film is reminiscent of the movies of Christopher Guest and won several film festival awards.

== Plot ==
Bogwood, Washington is a pleasant suburban community with a special distinction—it has more garages per capita than any other town in America. Not surprisingly, Bogwood is also the "Garage Sale Capital of the U.S.A."

When retirees Doris & Clayton Fenwick decide to empty their nest of retro-modern antiques, they set the wheels in motion for a frantically funny "g-sale" involving Bogwood's most avid garage sale junkies: Angela Cocci (an obsessive market researcher), Ed LaSalle (a beleaguered computer programmer and creator of the cult fantasy roleplaying game "Caves & Beasts"), Dick Nickerson (a retired star of the 60s sitcom "Pot o' Gold"), and BJ Harwood & Helen Ziegler (partners and owners of a trendy retro-modern antique store).

These colorful characters try to outmaneuver each other to score their ultimate garage sale treasure: an antique board game worth a fortune.

== Location ==
Bogwood was filmed on location in Seattle, Bellevue, and Bainbridge Island, Washington.
