= Jonathan Yudis =

American film director

- Occupation(s): Film director, actor

Jonathan Yudis is an American film director. He made his feature film debut in 2005 with Pervert!, a tribute to the films of Russ Meyer. He also directed the live-action segments of the Ren & Stimpy "Adult Party Cartoon" episode Fire Dogs 2. His wife is the daughter of filmmaker Ralph Bakshi.

In 2015 he was directing the comedy film Aloha Santa.
