= Mary Carey (actress) =

American actress and media personality (born 1980)

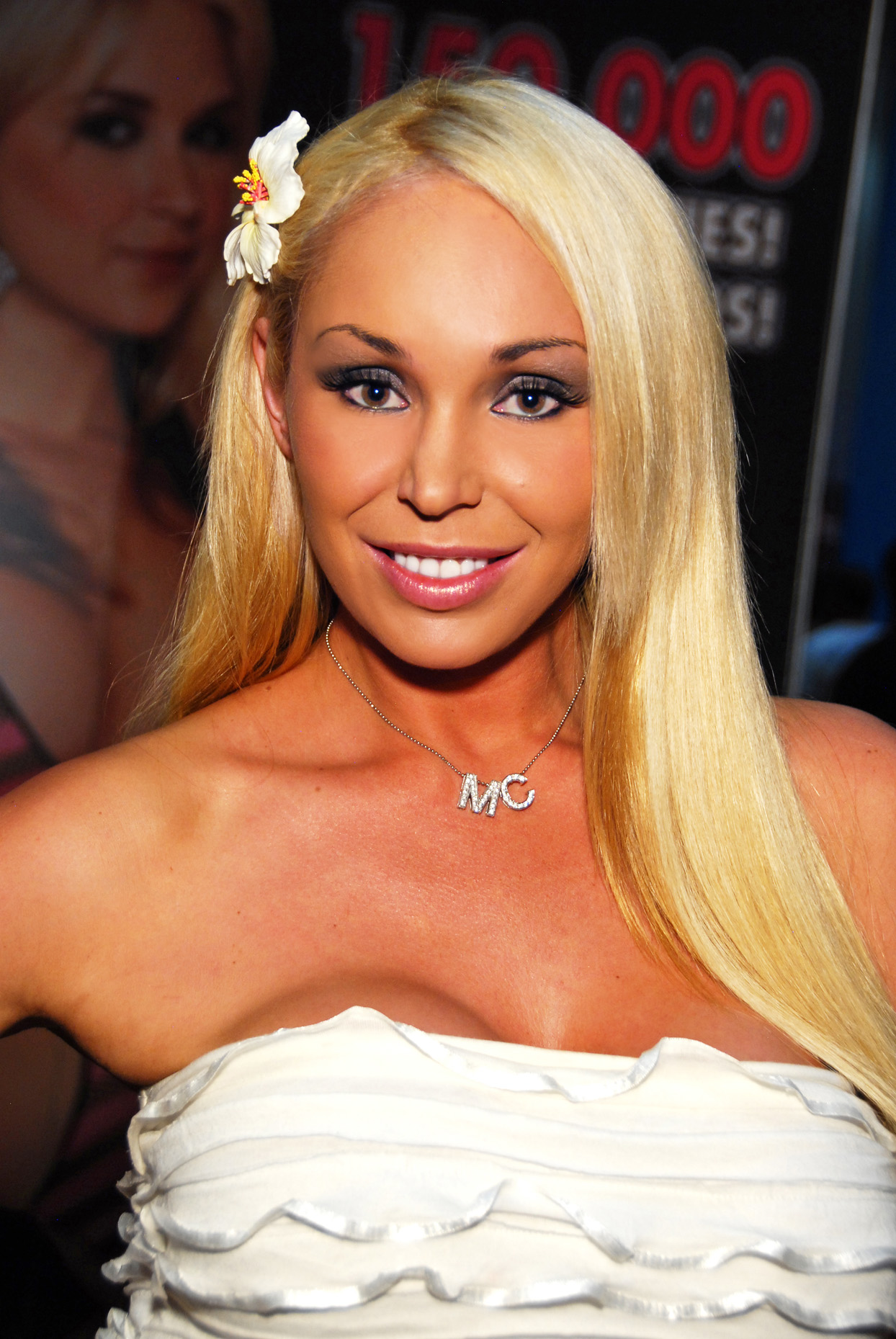
- Carey in 2011
- Born: June 15, 1980 (age 46); Cleveland, Ohio, U.S.
- Other name: Mary Ellen Cook
- Occupation: Actress
- Years active: 2000–2023
- Website: marycarey.com

Mary Ellen Cook (born June 15, 1980), known professionally as Mary Carey, is an American former adult film actress, Playboy model, radio host, film director and politician known for her appearance on the VH1 reality TV series Celebrity Rehab and Sober House. She was inducted into the AVN Hall of Fame in 2013. She ran as a replacement candidate in the 2003 California gubernatorial recall election, and had planned on running in the 2021 California gubernatorial recall election, but ultimately decided not to run in the election.

== Early life ==
Carey was born in Cleveland, Ohio, to a father with cerebral palsy and a mother with schizophrenia. She was raised by her grandparents from the age of three months old, moving with them to Fort Lauderdale, Florida at the age of seven. She attended Pine Crest preparatory school in Fort Lauderdale on a scholarship. Her grandfather died of lung cancer when she was 16. In 1999, she enrolled in Florida Atlantic University (FAU) with the intention of getting a degree in theatre. Trained in ballet, she performed on the dance team at FAU. After three years, she left university at 21 to help better provide for her family.

== Career ==
In addition to appearing in pornographic films, Carey has also worked as a feature dancer and appeared on Playboy TV. She retired from performing in adult films in 2008. In January/February 2008, Carey was featured on the VH1 reality TV series Celebrity Rehab, receiving treatment for alcoholism. While on Celebrity Rehab, she stated that she would leave the porn industry and straighten out her life because of her mother, who was hospitalized in Florida after jumping off a four-story building in a suicide attempt the previous month.

In the reunion episode of the show taped approximately six months after leaving rehab, she claimed she had not made an adult movie since becoming sober and intends to never make another one. However, she continues to "feature dance" in clubs, saying that she needs the money to care for her mother, but also hopes to stop doing this. In an interview with AVN magazine, Carey stated that she had entered rehab to tackle an addiction to Xanax, which she developed around the time she dropped out of her second run for governor and that the focus on alcohol was created by the show.

In 2009, Carey made a film titled Celebrity Pornhab with Dr. Screw. The film is a pornographic parody of the VH1 show and includes a sex scene between Carey and a female costar.

In 2011, Carey was interviewed for Celebrity Rehab Revisited stating that, following the end of the show, she had quit using Xanax and binge drinking, apart from occasional champagne. She had been married to an electrician for two years and stopped making adult films, but continued making a living with personal appearances in night clubs and strip clubs.

== Politics ==
During the 2003 California gubernatorial recall election, Carey signed a contract with Kick Ass Pictures and, as a publicity stunt, they came up with the idea that Carey should run for governor. She was an independent candidate, placing tenth in a field of 135 candidates. She ran on an eleven-point platform that included somewhat tongue-in-cheek promises of taxing breast implants, making lap dances tax-deductible, and creating a "Porn for Pistols" exchange program. She received 11,179 votes, placing her in tenth position in the election.

In June 2005, Carey announced her bid for Lieutenant Governor of California as an independent in 2006. She dropped out of the race in October 2006 to care for her mother, who had jumped off a building while off her medications.

In April 2021, Carey announced plans to run in the yet to be declared 2021 California gubernatorial recall election. In July, after the recall election was declared, Carey dropped out of the race, citing the short time scale for filing the paperwork for candidacy. As tribute to the porn industry's use of the term MILF, she said that her campaign message was going to be MILF, which she defined as "Moderates and Independents for Liberation and Freedom".

== Personal life ==
In April 2005, Carey was arrested in connection with a Lakewood, Washington, cabaret sting operation, for violating a city strip club ordinance that forbids dancers from sexually touching themselves. She subsequently made a plea agreement and received a 19-month sentence, which was suspended on the condition that she not be charged with any other offense within one year.

== Awards ==
- 2004 AVN Award – Best Overall Marketing Campaign (Individual Project) – Mary Carey Campaign
- 2004 FOXE Award – Vixen of the Year
- 2004 XRCO Award – Mainstream's Adult Media Favorite
- 2006 AVN Award – Best Overall Marketing Campaign (Individual Project) – Mary Carey's Dinner with President Bush
- 2013 AVN Hall of Fame

== See also ==
- List of pornographic film actors who have appeared in mainstream films
