= List of films broadcast by Horror Channel =

Horror Channel, formerly known as The Horror Channel (2004–2006) and Zone Horror (2006–2010), is a British television channel, featuring an array of films, particularly horror, but also those of different genres, including sci-fi, fantasy, thriller, adventure and cult classics.

On 30 June 2022, the channel was rebranded Legend, and does not follow the same broadcast output as the previous channel. Legend airs a variety of films of different genres, while still showing some horror films, the main horror theme of the channel has been dropped entirely. Furthermore, it is no longer a movie channel, but now a general entertainment network, as it features both movies and television series. However, a secondary channel, HorrorXtra, replaced Horror Channel as part of the movie channels, before being phased out completely when, on 22 November 2023, it was rebranded as Legend Xtra to keep in line with the Legend brand.

This list consists of feature films and television films that screened on Horror Channel (The Horror Channel and Zone Horror) between 2004 and 2022. A separate section has been included for HorrorXtra below. TV series and miniseries appear on the main article.

== Horror Channel (2004–2022) ==
=== 0–9 ===
Title	Year	Director	Ref.
100 Million BC	2008	Griff Furst	
11:11	2004	Michael Bafaro	
13 Eerie	2013	Lowell Dean	
13Hrs	2010	Jonathan Glendening	
13th Child	2002	Thomas Ashley; Steven Stockage	
13 Sins	2014	Daniel Stamm	
20 Million Miles to Earth	1957	Nathan Juran	
2001 Maniacs	2005	Tim Sullivan	
28 Days Later	2002	Danny Boyle	
28 Weeks Later	2007	Juan Carlos Fresnadillo	
3-Headed Shark Attack	2015	Christopher Ray	
30 Days of Night	2007	David Slade	
30,000 Leagues Under the Sea	2007	Gabriel Bologna	
The 39 Steps (version unknown)	1935 or 1959	Alfred Hitchcock or Ralph Thomas	
40 Days and Night	2012	Peter Geiger	
500 MPH Storm	2013	Daniel Lusko	
5ive Girls	2006	Warren P. Sonoda	
6-Headed Shark Attack	2018	Mark Atkins	
666: The Beast	2007	Nick Everhart	
666: The Child	2006	Jack Perez	
The 6th Day	2000	Roger Spottiswoode	
The 7 Adventures of Sinbad	2010	Adam Silver & Ben Hayflick	
976-EVIL	1988	Robert Englund	
99 Women	1969	Jesús Franco	

=== A ===
Title	Year	Director	Ref.
A Bay of Blood	1971	Mario Bava	
A Lonely Place to Die	2011	Julian Gilbey	
A Perfect Getaway	2009	David Twohy	
A Return to Salem's Lot	1987	Larry Cohen	
A Virgin Among the Living Dead	1973	Jesús Franco	
The Abandoned	2015	Eytan Rockaway	
Abominable	2006	Ryan Schifrin	
The Abominable Dr. Phibes	1971	Robert Fuest	
The Abominable Snowman	1957	Val Guest	
Adam Chaplin	2011	Emanuele De Santi	
Adam and Evil	2004	Andrew Van Slee	
AE: Apocalypse Earth	2013	Thunder Levin	
Afflicted	2013	Derek Lee & Clif Prowse	
After	2006	David L. Cunningham	
AfterDeath	2015	Gez Medinger	
Age of Dinosaurs	2013	Joseph J. Lawson	
Age of Ice	2014	Emile Edwin Smith	
Age of the Dragons	2011	Ryan Little	
Air Collision	2012	Liz Adams	
Airplane vs. Volcano	2014	The Kondelik Brothers	
Airtight	1999	Ian Barry	
Albino Farm	2009	Joe Anderson & Sean McEwen	
Alice, Sweet Alice	1976	Alfred Sole	
Alien Cargo	1999	Mark Haber	
Alien Convergence	2017	Rob Pallatina	
Alien Encounter	2008	Andrew Mackenzie	
Alien Fury Countdown to Invasion	2000	Rob Hedden	
Alien Nation: Body and Soul	1995	Kenneth Johnson	
Alien Nation: Dark Horizon	1994	Kenneth Johnson	
Alien Nation: Millennium	1996	Kenneth Johnson	
Alien Nation: The Enemy Within	1996	Kenneth Johnson	
Alien Nation: The Udara Legacy	1997	Kenneth Johnson	
Alien Terminator	1988	Nello Rossati	
Alive	2018	Rob Grant	
All Cheerleaders Die	2013	Lucky McKee & Chris Sivertson	
All the Boys Love Mandy Lane	2006	Jonathan Levine	
Almost Human	2013	Joe Begos	
Alone in the Dark	2005	Uwe Boll	
Alone in the Dark II	2008	Michael Roesch & Peter Scheerer	
Altered Species	2001	Miles Feldman	
Altitude	2010	Kaare Andrews	
Amer	2009	Jen and Sylvia Soska	
American Mary	2012	Hélène Cattet & Bruno Forzani	
Amityville 3	1983	Richard Fleischer	
Amityville II: The Possession	1982	Damiano Damiani	
An American Haunting	2005	Courtney Solomon	
An American Werewolf in London	1981	John Landis	
An American Werewolf in Paris	1997	Anthony Waller	
Anaconda	1997	Luis Llosa	
And Now the Screaming Starts!	1973	Roy Ward Baker	
And Soon the Darkness	1970	Robert Fuest	
Animals	2008	Douglas Aarniokski	
Another Wolfcop	2017	Lowell Dean	
Antiviral	2012	Brandon Cronenberg	
Apocalypse of the Dead	2009	Milan Konjević & Milan Todorović	
Ape vs. Monster	2021	Daniel Lusko	
Apocalypse of Ice	2020	Maximilian Elfeldt	
Apocalypse Pompeii	2014	Ben Demaree	
Arachnia	2003	Brett Piper	
Arachnid	2001	Jack Sholder	
Arachnoquake	2012	Griff Furst	
Arctic Apocalypse	2019	Eric Paul Erickson & Jon Kondelik	
Army of the Dead	2008	Joseph Conti	
The Arrival	1996	David Twohy	
Assault on Precinct 13	1976	John Carpenter	
Asteroid VS. Earth	2014	Christopher Ray	
Asylum	1972	Roy Ward Baker	
Asylum Night	2004	Brad Watson	
At the Earth's Core	1976	Kevin Connor	
Atlantic Rim	2013	Jared Cohn	
ATM	2012	David Brooks	
Atomic Dog	1998	Brian Trenchard-Smith	
Attack of the 50 Ft. Woman	1993	Christopher Guest	
Attack of the Sabretooth	2005	George T. Miller	
Attack of the Werewolves	2011	Juan Martínez Moreno	
Audition	1999	Takashi Miike	
Autopsy	2008	Adam Gierasch	
Autumn	2009	Steven Rumbelow	
Avalon - Beyond the Abyss	1999	Philip Sgriccia	
The Awakening	1980	Mike Newell	

=== B ===
Title	Year	Director	Ref.
Baby Blood	1990	Alain Robak	
Back Slash	2005	Kevin Campbell	
Back to the Planet of the Apes	1981	Arnold Laven & Don Weis	
The Backwoods	2006	Koldo Serra	
Bad Biology	2008	Frank Henenlotter	
Bad Meat	2011	Scott Dikkers	
Bad Milo!	2013	Jacob Vaughan	
Bad Samaritan	2018	Dean Devlin	
Bait	2012	Kimble Rendall	
Banshee	2008	Colin Theys	
Bare Behind Bars	1980	Oswaldo de Oliveira	
Basilisk: The Serpent King	2006	Stephen Furst	
Basket Case	1982	Frank Henenlotter	
The Bat	1959	Crane Wilbur	
Batman: The Movie	1966	Leslie H. Martinson	
Battleground	2012	Neil Mackay	
Bear	2010	John Rebel	
The Beast in the Cellar	1971	James Kelley	
The Beast Must Die	1974	Paul Annett	
Beauty and the Beast	2005	David Lister	
Bed of the Dead	2016	Jeff Maher	
Before Dawn	2012	Dominic Brunt	
Behemoth	2011	W.D. Hogan	
Behind the Mask: The Rise of Leslie Vernon	2006	Scott Glosserman	
Beneath	2013	Ben Ketai	
Beneath Still Waters	2005	Brian Yuzna	
Bereavement	2010	Stevan Mena	
Bermuda Tentacles	2014	Nick Lyon	
Berserker: Hell's Warrior	2004	Paul Matthews	
The Beyond	1981	Lucio Fulci	
Beyond Loch Ness	2008	Paul Ziller	
Beyond Re-Animator	2003	Brian Yuzna	
Beyond Sherwood Forest	2009	Peter DeLuise	
Beyond the Gates	2016	Jackson Stewart	
Big Ass Spider!	2013	Mike Mendez	
Big Bad Wolf	2006	Lance W. Dreesen	
Bigfoot	2012	Bruce Davison	
Bigfoot at Holler Creek	2006	John Poague	
Bikini Girls on Ice	2009	Geoff Klein	
The Bird with the Crystal Plumage	1970	Dario Argento	
Bite	2015	Chad Archibald	
Black Cadillac	2003	John Murlowski	
Black Christmas	1974	Bob Clark	
Black Death	2010	Christopher Smith	
Black Magic Rites	1973	Renato Polselli	
Black Moon Rising	1986	Harley Cokeliss	
Black Sheep	2006	Jonathan King	
Black Scorpion	1995	Jonathan Winfrey	
Black Scorpion II: Aftershock	1997	Jonathan Winfrey	
Black Water	2007	David Nerlich & Andrew Traucki	
The Black Waters of Echo's Pond	2009	Gabriel Bologna	
The Blackout	2009	Robert David Sanders	
Blackwater Valley Exorcism	2006	Ethan Wiley	
The Blair Witch Project	1999	Daniel Myrick & Eduardo Sánchez	
Blood Angels	2005	Ron Oliver	
The Blood Beast Terror	1967	Vernon Sewell	
Blood Car	2007	Alex Orr	
Blood Feast	1963	Herschell Gordon Lewis	
Blood from the Mummy's Tomb	1971	Seth Holt	
Blood of Dracula	1957	Herbert L. Strock	
The Blood of Fu Manchu	1968	Jesús Franco	
Blood Out	2011	Jason Hewitt	
Blood Predator	2007	Paul Cagney	
Blood Ranch	2006	Corbin Timbrook	
Blood Reaper	2003	Lory-Michael Ringuette	
Blood River	2009	Adam Mason	
Blood Runs Cold	2011	Sonny Laguna	
Blood Snow	2009	Jason Robert Stephens	
Blood Rage	1987	John Grissmer	
Blood Sucking Freaks	1976	Joel M. Reed	
BloodRayne: The Third Reich	2011	Uwe Boll	
Bloody Birthday	1981	Ed Hunt	
The Bloody Judge	1970	Jesús Franco	
Bloody Murder	2000	Ralph S. Portillo	
Bloody Murder 2: Closing Camp	2003	Rob Spera	
Blue Blood	1973	Andrew Sinclair	
Blue Steel	1989	Kathryn Bigelow	
Bluebeard	1944	Edgar G. Ulmer	
Boa vs. Python	2004	David Flores	
Body Count	1987	Ruggero Deodato	
Body Parts	1991	Eric Red	
The Body Stealers	1969	Gerry Levy	
Bone Eater	2008	Jim Wynorski	
The Boneyard	1991	James Cummins	
The Bone Snatcher	2003	Jason Wulfsohn	
Boo	2005	Anthony C. Ferrante	
Boogeyman 2	2007	Jeff Betancourt	
Book of Shadows: Blair Witch 2	2000	Joe Berlinger	
Border Patrol	2000	Mark Haber	
Borderland	2007	Zev Berman	
Born	2007	Richard Friedman	
The Borrower	1991	John McNaughton	
Botched	2007	Kit Ryan	
Bottom Feeder	2007	Randy Daudlin	
Bound	1996	The Wachowskis	
Bound to Vengeance	2015	José Manuel Cravioto	
Boy Eats Girl	2005	Stephen Bradley	
Brain Damage	1988	Frank Henenlotter	
Bram Stoker's Dracula	1992	Francis Ford Coppola	
BreadCrumbs	2011	Mike Nichols	
Breaking Dawn	2004	Mark Edwin Robinson	
The Breed	2001	Michael Oblowitz	
The Bride	1985	Franc Roddam	
Bride of Re-Animator	1990	Brian Yuzna	
The Brides of Dracula	1960	Terence Fisher	
The Brink	2006	Benjamin Cooper	
Broken	2006	Adam Mason & Simon Boynes	
The Brood	1979	David Cronenberg	
Brotherhood of Blood	2007	Michael Roesch & Peter Scheerer	
Bruiser	2000	George A. Romero	
B.T.K.	2008	Michael Feifer	
Buffy the Vampire Slayer	1992	Fran Rubel Kuzui	
The 'Burbs	1989	Joe Dante	
Buried Alive	2007	Robert Kurtzman	
The Burning	1981	Tony Maylam	
Burning Bright	2010	Carlos Brooks	
Burying the Ex	2014	Joe Dante	

=== C ===
Title	Year	Director	Ref.
Cabin Fever	2002	Eli Roth	
Cabin Fever 2: Spring Fever	2009	Ti West	
The Cabinet of Dr. Caligari	1920	Robert Wiene	
Caged Terror	1973	Barrie McLean & Kristen Weingartner	
Candy Stripers	2006	Kate Robbins	
Captain Clegg (a.k.a. Night Creatures)	1962	Peter Graham Scott	
Captain Kronos – Vampire Hunter	1972	Brian Clemens	
Captivity	2007	Roland Joffé	
The Card Player	2004	Dario Argento	
Carnival of Souls	1962	Herk Harvey	
Carnosaur	1993	Adam Simon	
Carnosaur 2	1994	Louis Morneau	
Carnosaur 3: Primal Species	1996	Jonathan Winfrey	
The Case of the Whitechapel Vampire	2002	Rodney Gibbons	
Cassadaga	2011	Anthony DiBlasi	
Castle Freak	1995	Stuart Gordon	
The Castle of Fu Manchu	1969	Jesús Franco	
The Cat o' Nine Tails	1971	Dario Argento	
Cat People	1982	Paul Schrader	
Cat's Eye	1985	Lewis Teague	
Catacombs	2007	Tomm Coker & David Elliot	
Caved In: Prehistoric Terror	2006	Richard Pepin	
Cell	2016	Tod Williams	
Cemetery Gates	2006	Roy Knyrim	
Chain Letter	2010	Deon Taylor	
Chaos	2005	David DeFalco	
Charade	1963	Stanley Donen	
Chernobyl Diaries	2012	Brad Parker	
Cherry Tree	2015	David Keating	
Cherry Tree Lane	2010	Paul Andrew Williams	
Child of Darkness, Child of Light	1991	Marina Sargenti	
The Children	2008	Tom Shankland	
Children of the Corn	1984	Fritz Kiersch	
Children of the Corn	2009	Donald P. Borchers	
Children of the Corn II: The Final Sacrifice	1992	David Price	
Children of the Corn III: Urban Harvest	1995	James D.R. Hickox	
Children of the Damned	1964	Anton M. Leader	
Child's Play	1988	Tom Holland	
Child's Play 2	1990	John Lafia	
Child's Play 3	1991	Jack Bender	
Chillerama	2011	Adam Rifkin, Tim Sullivan, Adam Green & Joe Lynch	
Choke	2001	John M. Sjogren	
Choker	2005	Vallelonga	
Christine	1983	John Carpenter	
Christmas Evil	1980	Lewis Jackson	
Chupacabra: Dark Seas	2005	John Shepphird	
Circus of Fear	1966	John Llewellyn Moxey	
Citizen Toxie: The Toxic Avenger IV	2000	Lloyd Kaufman	
The City of the Dead	1960	John Llewellyn Moxey	
City of the Living Dead	1980	Lucio Fulci	
Class of 1984	1982	Mark L. Lester	
Class of Nuke 'Em High	1986	Richard W. Haines, Michael Herz & Lloyd Kaufman	
Class of Nuke 'Em High 2: Subhumanoid Meltdown	1991	Eric Louzil & Donald G. Jackson	
Class of Nuke 'Em High 3: The Good, the Bad and the Subhumanoid	1994	Eric Louzil	
Closed for the Season	2010	Jay Woelfel	
Clown	2014	Jon Watts	
Cockneys vs Zombies	2012	Matthias Hoene	
Coffin	2011	Kipp Tribble & Derik Wingo	
Coffin Rock	2009	Rupert Glasson	
Cold Eyes of Fear	1971	Enzo G. Castellari	
Cold Moon	2016	Griff Furst	
Colin	2008	Marc Price	
The Collector	2009	Marcus Dunstan	
Collision Earth	2011	Paul Ziller	
Color Me Blood Red	1965	Herschell Gordon Lewis	
Comedown	2012	Menhaj Huda	
Communion	1989	Philippe Mora	
The Company of Wolves	1984	Neil Jordan	
Confined	2015	Eytan Rockaway	
Contagion	2002	John Murlowski	
Containment	2015	Neil Mcenery-West	
The Cook	2008	Gregg Simon	
The Corpse	1971	Viktors Ritelis	
Count Dracula	1977	Philip Saville	
Countess Dracula	1971	Peter Sasdy	
Cowboys & Zombies	2010	Rene Perez	
Cradle of Fear	2001	Alex Chandon	
The Crater Lake Monster	1977	William R. Stromberg	
Crawl	2011	Paul China	
Crawl or Die	2014	Oklahoma Ward	
The Crawling Hand	1963	Herbert L. Strock	
Crawlspace	2012	Justin Dix	
The Crazies	1973	George A. Romero	
Crazy Eights	2006	Jimi Jones	
Creature from the Black Lagoon	1954	Jack Arnold	
Creatures the World Forgot	1971	Don Chaffey	
Creep	2004	Christopher Smith	
Creep Van	2012	Scott W. McKinlay	
Creepshow 2	1987	Michael Gornick	
Critters 3	1991	Kristine Peterson	
Critters 4	1992	Rupert Harvey	
Crushed	2010	Patrick Johnson	
Cube	1997	Vincenzo Natali	
Cube 2: Hypercube	2002	Andrzej Sekuła	
Cube Zero	2004	Ernie Barbarash	
Cujo	1983	Lewis Teague	
The Curse of Frankenstein	1957	Terence Fisher	
Curse of the Crimson Altar	1968	Vernon Sewell	
Curse of the Forty-Niner	2002	John Carl Buechler	
Curse of the Komodo	2004	Jim Wynorski	
The Curse of the Mummy's Tomb	1964	Michael Carreras	
Curse of the Talisman	2001	Colin Budds	
The Curse of the Werewolf	1961	Terence Fisher	
Cursed	2013	L. Gustavo Cooper	
Cyborg 2	1993	Michael Schroeder	
The Cycle	2009	Michael Bafaro	
Cyrus: Mind of a Serial Killer	2010	Mark Vadik	

=== D ===
Title	Year	Director	Ref.
Damnation Alley	1977	Jack Smight	
Dance of the Dead	2008	Gregg Bishop	
Dangerous Worry Dolls	2008	Charles Band	
Dark Circles	2013	Paul Soter	
Dark Corners	2006	Ray Gower	
Dark Feed	2013	Michael Rasmussen & Shawn Rasmussen	
Dark Floors	2008	Pete Riski	
Dark House	2014	Victor Salva	
The Dark Lurking	2009	Gregory Connors	
Dark Night of the Scarecrow	1981	Frank De Felitta	
Dark Skies	2009	Ron Oliver	
Dark Storm	2006	Jason Bourque	
Dark Summer	2015	Paul Solet	
The Darkest Hour	2011	Chris Gorak	
Darkness Falls	2003	Jonathan Liebesman	
The Darkroom	2006	Michael Hurst	
The Darwin Conspiracy	1999	Winrich Kolbe	
Daughter of Darkness	1990	Andrew Laskos	
The Day	2015	Doug Aarniokoski	
Day of the Dead	1985	George A. Romero	
Day of the Dead	2008	Steve Miner	
The Day of the Triffids	1962	Steve Sekely	
The Day the Earth Stopped	2008	C. Thomas Howell	
Daybreakers	2009	The Spierig Brothers	
Daylight's End	2016	William Kaufman	
The Dead 2: India	2013	Howard J. Ford & Jon Ford	
Dead and Deader	2006	Patrick Dinhut	
Dead Heat	1988	Mark Goldblatt	
Dead Heist	2007	Bo Webb	
Dead Hooker in a Trunk	2009	The Soska Sisters	
Dead Mary	2007	Robert Wilson	
Dead Meat	2004	Conor McMahon	
Dead Mine	2012	Steven Sheil	
Dead Silence	2007	James Wan	
Dead Snow	2009	Tommy Wirkola	
Dead Snow 2: Red vs. Dead	2014	Tommy Wirkola	
The Dead Zone	1983	David Cronenberg	
Dead Girl	2008	Marcel Sarmiento	
DeadTime	2012	Tony Jopia	
Deadly Little Secrets	2002	Fiona MacKenzie	
The Deadly Spawn	1983	Douglas McKeown	
Deadly Swarm			
Dear God No!	2011	James Bickert	
Dearly Devoted	1998	Steve Cohen	
Death Line	1972	Gary Sherman	
Death of a Ghost Hunter	2007	Sean Tretta	
Death Proof	2007	Quentin Tarantino	
Death Row	2006	Kevin VanHook	
Deathrow Gameshow	1987	Mark Pirro	
Death Tunnel	2005	Philip Adrian Booth	
Deathgasm	2015	Jason Lei Howden	
Deathstalker	1983	James Sbardellati	
Decadent Evil	2005	Charles Band	
Decoy			
Deep Freeze	2001	John Carl Buechler	
Deep Red	1975	Dario Argento	
DeepStar Six	1989	Sean S. Cunningham	
Deliver Us from Evil	2014	Scott Derrickson	
Demon Hunter	2005	Scott Ziehl	
Demon Wind	1990	Charles Philip Moore	
Demons	1985	Lamberto Bava	
Demons 2	1986	Lamberto Bava	
The Demoniacs	1974	Jean Rollin	
Demonic	2015	Will Canon	
The Dentist	1996	Brian Yuzna	
The Dentist 2	1998	Brian Yuzna	
The Descent	2005	Neil Marshall	
Destruction: Las Vegas	2013	Jack Perez	
Detention	2010	James D.R. Hickox	
Devil in the Flesh 2	2000	Richard Brandes	
Devil May Call	2013	Jason Cuadrado	
The Devil Rides Out	1968	Terence Fisher	
The Devil's Business	2011	Sean Hogan	
Devil's Den	2006	Jeff Burr	
The Devil's Nightmare	1971	Jean Brismée	
The Devil's Party	1938	Ray McCarey	
The Devil's Rain	1975	Robert Fuest	
The Devil's Rejects	2005	Rob Zombie	
The Devil's Rock	2011	Paul Campion	
The Devil's Tattoo	2003	Julian Kean	
Diagnosis: Death	2009	Jason Stutter	
Diary of the Dead	2007	George A. Romero	
Dinocroc	2004	Kevin O'Neill	
Dinocroc vs. Supergator	2010	Mike MacLean	
Dinosaur Island	1994	Fred Olen Ray & Jim Wynorski	
Disaster Zone: Volcano in New York	2006	Robert Lee	
Discarnate	2018	Mario Sorrenti	
Do You Wanna Know a Secret?	2001	Thomas Bradford & Neill Fearnley	
Dog Soldiers	2002	Neil Marshall	
Doghouse	2009	Jake West	
Dolly Dearest	1991	Maria Lease	
Donnie Darko	2001	Richard Kelly	
Don't Answer the Phone!	1980	Robert Hammer	
Don't Blink	2014	Travis Oates	
Don't Go Near the Park	1981	Lawrence D. Foldes	
Don't Hang Up	2016	Alexis Wajsbrot & Damien Macé	
Don't Let Him In	2011	Kelly Smith	
Don't Look in the Basement	1973	S. F. Brownrigg	
Don't Look Up	2009	Fruit Chan	
Don't Turn Out the Lights			
Doom	2005	Andrzej Bartkowiak	
Doomwatch	1972	Peter Sasdy	
Dr. Chopper	2005	Lewis Schoenbrun	
Dr. Jekyll and Sister Hyde	1971	Roy Ward Baker	
Dr. Moreau's House of Pain	2004	Charles Band	
Dr. Phibes Rises Again	1972	Robert Fuest	
Dr. Terror's House of Horrors	1965	Freddie Francis	
Dracula	1931	Tod Browning	
Dracula	1958	Terence Fisher	
Dracula: Prince of Darkness	1966	Terence Fisher|	
Drag Me to Hell	2009	Sam Raimi	
Dragon	2006	Leigh Scott	
Dragon Hunter	2009	Stephen Shimek	
Dragon Storm	2004	Stephen Furst	
Dragon Wars	2007	Shim Hyung-rae	
Dragonquest	2009	Mark Atkins	
Dread	2009	Anthony DiBlasi	
The Dread	2007	Michael Spence	
Dream Home	2010	Pang Ho-cheung	
Dream House	1998	Graeme Campbell	
Drive-Thru	2007	Brendan Cowles & Shane Kuhn	
Dune	1984	David Lynch	
Dust Devil	1992	Richard Stanley	
Dying God	2008	Fabrice Lambot	

=== E ===
Title	Year	Director	Ref.
Earth vs. the Flying Saucers	1956	Fred F. Sears	
Eat Locals	2017	Jason Flemyng	
Eaten Alive	1977	Tobe Hooper	
Eaters	2011	Luca Boni & Marco Ristori	
Ed Gein: By the Light of the Moon	2000	Chuck Parello	
Eden Lake	2008	James Watkins	
Edges of Darkness	2008	Blaine Cade; Jason Horton	
Elevator	2011	Stig Svendsen	
Elfie Hopkins	2012	Ryan Andrews	
Elsewhere	2009	Nathan Hope	
Elvira, Mistress of the Dark	1988	James Signorelli	
Elvira's Haunted Hills	2001	Sam Irvin	
Empire of the Sharks	2017	Mark Atkins	
Encounters	1993	Murray Fahey	
End of the World	2013	Steven R. Monroe	
End of the World	2018	Maximillian Elfeldt	
Endangered Species	2003	Kevin Tenney	
Eraserhead	1977	David Lynch	
Escape from Mars	1999	Neill Fearnley	
Escape Room	2017	Peter Dukes	
Eternal Blood	2002	Jorge Olguín	
Eugenie… The Story of Her Journey into Perversion	1970	Jesús Franco	
Evil Aliens	2005	Jake West	
The Evil Below	1989	Wayne Crawford & Jean-Claude Dubois	
Evil Breed: The Legend of Samhain	2003	Christian Viel	
The Evil Dead	1981	Sam Raimi	
The Evil of Frankenstein	1964	Freddie Francis	
Exists	2014	Eduardo Sánchez	
The Exorcism of Emily Rose	2005	Scott Derrickson	
Exorcism: The Possession of Gail Bowers	2006	Leigh Scott	
Exorcismus	2010	Manuel Carballo	
Exorcist III	1990	William Peter Blatty	
Exorcist: The Beginning	2004	Renny Harlin	
Experiment	2005	Dan Turner	
Extraterrestrial	2014	Colin Minihan	
The Exterminator	1980	James Glickenhaus	
The Eye	2008	David Moreau & Xavier Palud	

=== F ===
Title	Year	Director	Ref.
F6: Twister	2012	Peter Sullivan	
The Fallen Ones	2005	Kevin VanHook	
Fascination	1979	Jean Rollin	
Fear	1990	Rockne S. O'Bannon	
Fear in the Night	1972	Jimmy Sangster	
Fear Island	2009	Michael Storey	
FeardotCom	2002	William Malone	
Feed	2005	Brett Leonard	
Fear Chamber	1968	Jack Hill	
Fear, Inc.	2016	Vincent Masciale	
Feral	2017	Mark Young	
The Ferryman	2007	Chris Graham	
The Final	2010	Joey Stewart	
Final Girl	2015	Tyler Shields	
The Final Girls	2015	Todd Strauss-Schulson	
Fire Serpent	2007	John Terlesky	
Fireball	2009	Kristoffer Tabori	
Fist of the Vampire	2007	Len Kabasinski	
Five Across the Eyes	2006	Greg Swinson; Ryan Thiessen	
The Flesh and Blood Show	1972	Pete Walker	
Flesh for the Beast	2003	Terry M. West	
The Flock	2007	Andrew Lau	
Flowers in the Attic	1987	Jeffrey Bloom	
The Fly	1958	Kurt Neumann	
The Fog	1980	John Carpenter	
The Forgotten One	1989	Phillip Badger	
Frankenfish	2004	Mark A.Z. Dippé	
Frankenhooker	1990	Frank Henenlotter	
Frankenstein	1931	James Whale	
Frankenstein	2015	Bernard Rose	
Frankenstein: The True Story	1973	Jack Smight	
Frankenstein and the Monster from Hell	1974	Terence Fisher	
Frankenstein Created Woman	1967	Terence Fisher	
Frankenstein Reborn!	1998	David DeCoteau	
Frankenstein's Army	2013	Richard Raaphorst	
Frankenstein's Castle of Freaks	1974	Dick Randall	
Frayed	2007	Norbert Caoili; Rob Portmann	
Freakdog	2008	Paddy Breathnach	
Freaks of Nature	2015	Robbie Pickering	
Freakshow	2007	Drew Bell	
Fright	1971	Peter Collinson	
Fright Night	1985	Tom Holland	
Frightmare	1974	Pete Walker	
The Frighteners	1996	Peter Jackson	
Frogs	1972	George McCowan	
From a House on Willow Street	2016	Alistair Orr	
From Beyond the Grave	1974	Kevin Connor	
From the Dark	2014	Conor McMahon	
Frontier(s)	2007	Xavier Gens	
Frozen	2010	Adam Green	
The Frozen Dead	1966	Herbert J. Leder	
Funny Man	1994	Simon Sprackling	

=== G ===
Title	Year	Director	Ref.
Gacy	2003	Clive Saunders	
The Garden	2006	Don Michael Paul	
Garden of Love	2003	Olaf Ittenbach	
Gargoyle	2004	Jim Wynorski	
Ghost Storm	2011	Paul Ziller	
Ghost Story	1974	Stephen Weeks	
Ghost Writer	2007	Alan Cumming	
The Ghoul	1933	T. Hayes Hunter	
The Ghouls	2003	Chad Ferrin	
The Giant Claw	1957	Fred F. Sears	
Ginger Snaps	2000	John Fawcett	
The Gingerdead Man	2005	Charles Band	
Gingerdead Man 2: Passion of the Crust	2008	Silvia St. Croix	
Goblin	2010	Jeffery Scott Lando	
The Gore Gore Girls	1972	Herschell Gordon Lewis	
Gothika	2003	Mathieu Kassovitz	
Grabbers	2012	Jon Wright	
Grapes of Death	1978	Jean Rollin	
Grave Encounters	2011	The Vicious Brothers	
Grave Halloween	2013	Steven R. Monroe	
Grave Mistake	2008	Shawn Darling	
The Gravedancers	2006	Mike Mendez	
The Green Inferno	2013	Eli Roth	
Grim Reaper	2007	Michel Feifer	
Grindstone Road	2008	Melanie Orr	
Grizzly	1976	William Girdler	
Growth	2010	Gabriel Cowan	
The Grudge	2004	Takashi Shimizu	

=== H ===
Title	Year	Director	Ref.
Habit	2017	Simone Halligan	
The Halfway House	2004	Kenneth J. Hall	
Hallowed Ground	2007	David Benullo	
Halloween II	1981	Rick Rosenthal	
Halloween III: Season of the Witch	1982	Tommy Lee Wallace	
Halloween Night	2006	Mark Atkins	
The Hamiltons	2006	The Butcher Brothers	
Hands of the Ripper	1971	Peter Sasdy	
Hannibal Rising	2007	Peter Webber	
The Happening	2008	M. Night Shyamalan	
Happy Birthday to Me	1981	J. Lee Thompson	
Hard Rock Zombies	1985	Krishna Shah	
Hardware	1990	Richard Stanley	
Harold's Going Stiff	2011	Keith Wright	
Hatchet for the Honeymoon	1970	Mario Bava	
Hatchet II	2010	Adam Green	
Haunted	1995	Lewis Gilbert	
Haunted Heart	Unknown	Unknown	
Haunter	2013	Vincenzo Natali	
The Haunting of Morella	1990	Jim Wynorski	
Haunting of Winchester House	2009	Mark Atkins	
Head Cheerleader, Dead Cheerleader	2000	Jeff Miller	
Headshot	2016	The Mo Brothers	
The Hearse	1980	George Bowers	
Heartstopper	2006	Bob Keen	
Heat Wave	2009	Rex Piano	
Heathers	1988	Michael Lehmann	
The Heavy	2009	Marcus Warren	
Hell Comes to Frogtown	1987	Donald G. Jackson; R. J. Kizer	
Hellbent	1988	Richard Casey	
Hellbinders	2009	Mitch Gould; Hiro Koda; David Wald	
Hellblock 13	1999	Paul Talbot	
Hellbound: Hellraiser II	1988	Tony Randel	
Hellgate	1989	William A. Levey	
Hellraiser	1987	Clive Barker	
Hellraiser III: Hell on Earth	1992	Anthony Hickox	
Hell's Rain	2007	Kristoffer Tabori	
Henry Lee Lucas: Serial Killer	2009	Michael Feifer	
The Heretics	2017	Chad Archibald	
Heroine of Hell	1996	Nietzchka Keene	
The Hexecutioners	2015	Jesse Thomas Cook	
Hidden	2011	Antoine Thomas	
Hide and Go Shriek	1988	Skip Schoolnik	
Hideous!	1997	Charles Band	
High Lane	2009	Abel Ferry	
Highlander	1986	Russell Mulcahy	
Hillbillys in a Haunted House	1967	Jean Yarbrough	
The Hills Have Eyes	1977	Wes Craven	
The Hills Have Eyes Part II	1985	Wes Craven	
The Hillside Strangler	2004	Chuck Parello	
Hipnos	2004	David Carreras	
The Hole	2001	Nick Hamm	
Honeymoon	2014	Leigh Janiak	
Horror 101	2001	James Glenn Dudelson	
Horror Express	1972	Eugenio Martín	
Horror in the Attic	2001	Jeremy Kasten	
The Horror of Frankenstein	1970	Jimmy Sangster	
The Horseman	2008	Steven Kastrissios	
Horsemen	2009	Jonas Åkerlund	
House	1986	Steve Miner	
The House by the Cemetery	1981	Lucio Fulci	
House II: The Second Story	1987	Ethan Wiley	
House III	1989	James Isaac	
House IV	1992	Lewis Abernathy	
The House Next Door	2006	Jeff Woolnough	
House of 1000 Corpses	2003	Rob Zombie	
House of Fears	2007	Ryan Little	
The House of the Devil	2009	Ti West	
The House of Usher	2006	Hayley Cloake	
House of Whipcord	1974	Pete Walker	
House on Straw Hill	1976	James Kenelm Clarke	
The House That Dripped Blood	1970	Peter Duffell	
Howl	2015	Paul Hyett	
Howling II: Your Sister is a Werewolf	1985	Philippe Mora	
Howling III: The Marsupials	1987	Philippe Mora	
Howling IV: The Original Nightmare	1988	John Hough	
Howling V: The Rebirth	1989	Neal Sundstrom	
Howling VI: The Freaks	1991	Hope Perello	
Howling: New Moon Rising	1995	Clive Turner	
The Humanoid	1979	Aldo Lado	
Huntress: Spirit of the Night	1995	Mark S. Manos	
Hush Little Baby	1994	Jorge Montesi	
Husk	2011	Brett Simmons	
Hydra	2009	Andrew Prendergast	
Hyenas	2011	Eric Weston	
Hypothermia	2012	James Felix McKenney	

=== I ===
Title	Year	Director	Ref.
I Am Omega	2007	Griff Furst	
I Am the Ripper	2004	Eric Anderson	
I Sell the Dead	2008	Glenn McQuaid	
I Spit on Your Grave	1978	Meir Zarchi	
I Spit on Your Grave	2010	Steven R. Monroe	
I Spit on Your Grave III: Vengeance is Mine	2013	Steven R. Monroe	
Ibiza Undead	2016	Andy Edwards	
Ice Spiders	2007	Tibor Takács	
Ice Twisters	2009	Steven R. Monroe	
Idle Hands	1999	Rodman Flender	
Ilsa, Harem Keeper of the Oil Sheiks	1976	Don Edmonds	
Ilsa, the Tigress of Siberia	1977	Jean LaFleur	
The Incredible Melting Man	1977	William Sachs	
The Incredible Shrinking Man	1957	Jack Arnold	
Independence Daysaster	2013	W.D. Hogan	
Inferno	1980	Dario Argento	
Inferno	1998	Ian Barry	
Inhuman Resources	2012	Daniel Krige	
Innocent Blood	1992	John Landis	
The Insatiable	2007	Chuck Konzelman; Cary Solomon	
Insecticidal	2005	Jeffery Scott Lando	
Inseminoid	1981	Norman J. Warren	
The Invaders	1995	Paul Shapiro	
Invaders from Mars	1986	Tobe Hooper	
The Iron Rose	1973	Jean Rollin	
This Island Earth	1955	Joseph M. Newman & Jack Arnold	
Island of Death	1976	Nico Mastorakis	
Island of Terror	1966	Terence Fisher	
It!	1967	Herbert J. Leder	
It Came from Beneath the Sea	1955	Robert Gordon	
It Came from the Desert	2017	Marko Mäkilaakso	
It's Alive	2008	Josef Rusnak	
Itsy Bitsy	2019	Micah Gallo	

=== J ===
Title	Year	Director	Ref.
Jack Frost	1997	Michael Cooney	
Jack Frost 2: Revenge of the Mutant Killer Snowman	2000	Michael Cooney	
Jeepers Creepers 2	2003	Victor Salva	
Jekyll & Hyde	1990	David Wickes	
Johnny Mnemonic	1995	Robert Longo	
Journey to the Center of the Earth	1993	William Dear	
Journey to the Center of the Earth	2008	David Jones & Scott Wheeler	
Journey to the Far Side of the Sun	1969	Robert Parrish	
Joy Ride	2001	John Dahl	
Ju-on: The Grudge	2002	Takashi Shimizu	
The Jurassic Games	2018	Ryan Bellgardt	

=== K ===
Title	Year	Director	Ref.
Kemper: The CoEd Killer	2008	Rick Bitzelberger	
Kill Command	2016	Steven Gomez	
Killer Bees!	2002	Penelope Buitenhuis	
Killer Fish	1978	Antonio Margheriti	
The Killer Shrews	1959	Ray Kellogg	
Killing Car	1993	Jean Rollin	
Kiss of the Vampire	2009	Joe Tornatore	
King Arthur and the Knights of the Round Table	2017	Jared Cohn	
Knuckleball	2018	Michael Peterson	
Kolobos	1999	Daniel Liatowitsch; David Todd Ocvirk	
Komodo vs. Cobra	2005	Jim Wynorski	
Konga	1961	John Lemont	

=== L ===
Title	Year	Director	Ref.
L'Anticristo	1974	Alberto De Martino	
Lady of Burlesque	1943	William A. Wellman	
Laid to Rest	2009	Robert Green Hall	
The Lair of the White Worm	1988	Ken Russell	
Lake Placid 2	2007	David Flores	
Lake Placid 3	2010	Griff Furst	
Lake Placid: Legacy	2018	Darrell Roodt	
The Land That Time Forgot	2009	C. Thomas Howell	
The Last	2007	Andy Hill	
The Last Days on Mars	2013	Ruairí Robinson	
The Last Horror Movie	2003	Julian Richards	
The Last Lovecraft: Relic of Cthulhu	2009	Henry Saine	
The Last Man on Planet Earth	1999	Les Landau	
Last Rites	2006	Duane Stinnett	
The Last Sect	2006	Jonathan Dueck	
Lava Storm	2008	Sean Dwyer	
The Legend of Lucy Keyes	2006	John Stimpson	
The Legend of the 7 Golden Vampires	1974	Roy Ward Baker & Chang Cheh	
Leprechaun	1993	Mark Jones	
Leprechaun 2	1994	Rodman Flender	
Leprechaun 3	1995	Brian Trenchard-Smith	
Leprechaun 4: In Space	1997	Brian Trenchard-Smith	
Leprechaun: In the Hood	2000	Rob Spera	
Lesbian Vampire Killers	2009	Phil Claydon	
Let Me In	2010	Matt Reeves	
Let the Right One In	2008	Tomas Alfredson	
Life Blood	2009	Ron Carlson	
Life in a Day	1999	Eleanor Lindo	
Life, Liberty and Pursuit on the Planet of the Apes	1981	Alf Kjellin & Arnold Laven	
Lifeforce	1985	Tobe Hooper	
Lighthouse	1999	Simon Hunter	
Link	1986	Richard Franklin	
Live Feed	2006	Ryan Nicholson	
Livid	2011	Alexandre Bustillo & Julien Maury	
The Living and the Dead	2006	Simon Rumley	
The Living Dead Girl	1982	Jean Rollin	
Living Hell	2008	Richard Jefferies	
The Locals	2003	Greg Page	
Lockjaw: Rise of the Kulev Serpent	2008	Amir Valinia	
Lolita 2000	1998	Cybil Richards	
Lonely Joe	2009	Michael Coonce	
Look What's Happened to Rosemary's Baby	1976	Sam O'Steen	
Lord of Illusions	1995	Clive Barker	
The Lost	2006	Chris Sivertson	
Lost City Raiders	2008	Jean de Segonzac	
Lost Highway	1997	David Lynch	
Lost in the Bermuda Triangle	1998	Norberto Barba	
The Lost World	1960	Irwin Allen	
The Loved Ones	2009	Sean Byrne	
Lovely Molly	2012	Eduardo Sánchez	
Lovers Lane	1999	Jon Steven Ward	
Lost Colony	2007	Matt Codd	
The Lost Future	2010	Mikael Salomon	
Lost Highway	1997	David Lynch	
The Lurking Fear	1994	C. Courtney Joyner	
Lust for a Vampire	1971	Jimmy Sangster	
Lycan	2007	Gregory C. Parker & Christian Pindar	

=== M ===
Title	Year	Director	Ref.
Madhouse	1974	Jim Clark	
Maggie	2015	Henry Hobson	
Malibu Shark Attack	2009	David Lister	
Mammoth	2006	Tim Cox	
The Man Who Fell to Earth	1976	Nicolas Roeg	
The Man Who Haunted Himself	1970	Basil Dearden	
Maneater	2009	Michael Emanuel	
The Mangler	1995	Tobe Hooper	
Manhunt	2008	Patrik Syversen	
Maniac Cop	1988	William Lustig	
Maniac Cop 2	1990	William Lustig	
Maniac Cop III: Badge of Silence	1993	William Lustig; Joel Soisson	
Maniac Nurses Find Ecstasy	1990	Léon Paul De Bruyn	
Maniacts	2001	C.W Cressler; Curt Cressler	
Man-Thing	2005	Brett Leonard	
Martian Land	2015	Scott Wheeler	
Marked	2007	Dustin Voigt	
Martyrs	2008	Pascal Laugier	
Mary Shelley's Frankenstein	1994	Kenneth Branagh	
Masque of the Red Death	1964	Roger Corman	
Masque of the Red Death (version unknown)	1989	Alan Birkinshaw or Larry Band	
Maximum Overdrive	1986	Stephen King	
May	2002	Lucky McKee	
Mazes and Monsters	1982	Steven Hilliard Stern	
The Medusa Touch	1978	Jack Gold	
Mega Shark Versus Crocosaurus	2010	Christopher Ray	
Mega Shark Versus Giant Octopus	2009	Jack Perez	
Mega Snake	2007	Tibor Takács	
Megaconda	2010	Christopher Ray	
Megalodon	2018	James Thomes	
Meltdown	2006	J.P. Howell	
Memory	2006	Bennett Joshua Davlin	
Merlin and the War of the Dragons	2008	Mark Atkins	
The Messengers	2007	The Pang Brothers	
Messengers 2: The Scarecrow	2009	Martin Barnewitz	
Meteorites!	1998	Chris Thompson; Chris Thomson	
Miami Magma	2011	Todor Chapkanov	
Midnight Movie	2008	Jack Messitt	
Midnight Offerings	1981	Rod Holcomb	
Midnight Son	2011	Scott Leberecht	
Mind Warp	1977	Joy N. Houck Jr.	
Mindhunters	2004	Renny Harlin	
The Mist	2007	Frank Darabont	
Momentum	2003	James Seale	
Monster!	1999	John Lafia	
The Monster Club	1980	Roy Ward Baker	
Monster in the Closet	1986	Bob Dahlin	
Monster Island	2004	Jack Perez	
Monster Man	2003	Michael Davis	
Monstro!	2010	Stuart Simpson	
Moonstalker	1989	Michael O'Rourke	
Morgana	2012	Ramón Obón	
Mortuary	2005	Tobe Hooper	
Mosquito	1995	Gary Jones	
Most Likely to Die	2015	Anthony DiBlasi	
Mother's Day	1980	Charles Kaufman	
Mother's Day	2010	Darren Lynn Bousman	
Motor Home Massacre	2005	Allen Wilbanks	
Mulholland Drive	2001	David Lynch	
Mum & Dad	2008	Steven Sheil	
The Mummy	1932	Karl Freund	
The Mummy	1959	Terence Fisher	
The Mummy's Shroud	1967	John Gilling	
Murder by Moonlight	1989	Michael Lindsay-Hogg	
Murder in Law	1989	Tony Jiti Gill	
Murder Loves Killers Too	2009	Drew Barnhardt	
Murder Party	2007	Jeremy Saulnier	
Mutants	2008	Amir Valinia	
The Mutations	1974	Jack Cardiff	
My Bloody Valentine	1981	George Mihalka	
My Bloody Valentine	2009	Patrick Lussier	
My Name Is Bruce	2007	Bruce Campbell	

=== N ===
Title	Year	Director	Ref.
Nails	2017	Dennis Bartok	
Nazi Dawn	2008	Roel Reiné	
Necessary Evil	2008	Peter J. Eaton	
Necromancer	1988	Dusty Nelson	
Necromentia	2009	Pearry Reginald Teo	
Necrosis	2009	Jason Robert Stephens	
The Neighbor	1993	Rodney Gibbons	
Netherbeast Incorporated	2007	Dean Ronalds	
Never Cry Werewolf	2008	Brenton Spencer	
The Night Caller	1998	Robert Malenfant	
Night Drive	2010	Justin Head	
Night of the Big Heat	1967	Terence Fisher	
Night of the Demon	1980	James C. Wasson	
Night of the Demons	2009	Adam Gierasch	
Night of the Living Dead	1968	George A. Romero	
Nightmare	2005	Dylan Bank	
Nightmare Man	2006	Rolfe Kanefsky	
NightScream	1997	Noel Nosseck	
Nightwing	1979	Arthur Hiller	
Nightworld	2017	Patricio Valladares	
Nite Tales: The Movie	2008	Deon Taylor	
No Man's Land: The Rise of Reeker	2008	Dave Payne	
No One Lives	2012	Ryuhei Kitamura	
No Return	2003	Tom Sylla	
Nosferatu	1922	F. W. Murnau	
Nostradamus	2000	Tibor Takács	
Nothing But the Night	1973	Peter Sasdy	
Nude for Satan	1974	Luigi Batzella	
Nude Nuns with Big Guns	2010	Joseph Guzman	
The Nude Vampire	1970	Jean Rollin	

=== O ===
Title	Year	Director	Ref.
Obsession	1976	Brian De Palma	
Oceans Rising	2017	Adam Lipsius	
Ogre	2008	Steven R. Monroe	
Omen IV: The Awakening	1991	Jorge Montesi & Dominique Othenin-Girard	
One-Eyed Monster	2008	Adam Fields	
Open Water	2003	Chris Kentis	
Outcast	2010	Colm McCarthy	
Oxygen	1999	Richard Shepard	

=== P ===
Title	Year	Director	Ref.
The Pact	2012	Nicholas McCarthy	
Panic Button	2011	Chris Crow	
Pan's Labyrinth	2006	Guillermo del Toro	
Paperhouse	1988	Bernard Rose	
The Paradise Virus	2003	Brian Trenchard-Smith	
Parasite	2004	Andrew Prendergast	
Parasomnia	2008	William Malone	
Party Crasher	2000	Mark Mason	
Passed the Door of Darkness	2008	Peter Mervis	
Patchwork	2015	Tyler MacIntyre	
Pay the Ghost	2015	Uli Edel	
Peeping Tom	1960	Michael Powell	
Penetration Angst	2003	Wolfgang Büld	
Penny Dreadful	2006	Richard Brandes	
Penumbra	2011	Adrián García Bogliano & Ramiro García Bogliano	
The People Under the Stairs	1991	Wes Craven	
Perfect Life	2010	Josef Rusnak	
Pernicious	2009	James Cullen Bressack	
Pervert!	2005	Jonathan Yudis	
Phenomena	1985	Dario Argento	
The Philadelphia Experiment	2012	Paul Ziller	
Pieces	1982	Juan Piquer Simón	
Pig Hunt	2008	James Isaac	
Piranha	1995	Scott P. Levy	
The Plague	2006	Hal Masonberg	
The Plague of the Zombies	1966	John Gilling	
Plaguers	2008	Brad Sykes	
Plague Town	2008	David Gregory	
Planet of the Sharks	2016	Mark Atkins	
Planet Terror	2007	Robert Rodriguez	
Poison Ivy II: Lily	1996	Anne Goursaud	
Poison Ivy: The New Seduction	1997	Kurt Voss	
Polar Storm	2009	Paul Ziller	
Pontypool	2008	Bruce McDonald	
Portal	2008	Geoffrey Schaaf	
Possessed by the Night	1994	Fred Olen Ray	
The Possession	2012	Ole Bornedal	
Post Impact	2004	Christoph Schrewe	
Pray for Morning	2006	Cartney Wearn	
Premonition	2005	Jonas Quastel	
Pretty Little Devils	2008	Irving Rothberg	
Prey	2007	Darrell Roodt	
Priest	2011	Scott Stewart	
Primal Force	1999	Nelson McCormick	
The Prince	2014	Brian A. Miller	
Prince of Darkness	1987	John Carpenter	
Princess of Mars	2009	Mark Atkins	
Prison	1987	Renny Harlin	
Progeny	1999	Brian Yuzna	
Project Vampire	1993	Peter Flynn	
Project Viper	2002	Jim Wynorski	
Psycho II	1983	Richard Franklin	
Psycho III	1986	Anthony Perkins	
Psycho IV: The Beginning	1990	Mick Garris	
Psychosis	2010	Reg Traviss	
Psyclops	2002	Brett Piper	
Pterodactyl	2005	Mark L. Lester	
Pulse	2001	Kiyoshi Kurosawa	
Pumpkinhead	1988	Stan Winston	
Puppet Master 4	1993	Jeff Burr	
Puppet Master: Axis of Evil	2010	David DeCoteau	
Puppet Master vs Demonic Toys	2004	Ted Nicolaou	
Purgatory	1999	Uli Edel	
Puritan	2005	Hadi Hajaig	

=== Q ===
Title	Year	Director	Ref.
Quarantine 2: Terminal	2011	John Pogue	
Quarries	2016	Nils Taylor	
Quatermass and the Pit	1967	Roy Ward Baker	

=== R ===
Title	Year	Director	Ref.
Rabid	1977	David Cronenberg	
Rabies	2010	Aharon Keshales; Navot Papushado	
Radius	2017	Caroline Labrèche & Steeve Léonard	
The Rage	2007	Robert Kurtzman	
Raiders of the Damned	2006	Milko Davis	
The Rape of the Vampire	1968	Jean Rollin	
Rasputin: The Mad Monk	1966	Don Sharp	
Ravenous	1999	Antonia Bird	
Raven's Ridge	1997	Mike Upton	
Rawhead Rex	1986	George Pavlou	
Raze	2013	Josh C. Waller	
Re-Animator	1985	Stuart Gordon	
Recreator	2012	Gregory Orr	
Red Canyon	2008	Giovanni Rodriguez	
Red Lights	2012	Rodrigo Cortés	
Red Riding Hood	2003	Giacomo Cimini	
Red State	2011	Kevin Smith	
Red White & Blue	2010	Simon Rumley	
Redwood	2017	Tom Paton	
Redneck Zombies	1987	Pericles Lewnes	
The Reef	2010	Andrew Traucki	
The Remaining	2014	Casey La Scala	
Remains	2011	Colin Theys	
Repo! The Genetic Opera	2008	Darren Lynn Bousman	
The Reptile	1966	John Gilling	
Requiem for a Vampire	1971	Jean Rollin	
Resident Evil	2002	Paul W.S. Anderson	
Resident Evil: Extinction	2007	Russell Mulcahy	
Resurrecting: The Street Walker	2009	Özgür Uyanık	
Retreat	2011	Carl Tibbets	
Retro Puppet Master	1999	David DeCoteau	
The Return of Swamp Thing	1989	Jim Wynorski	
The Return of the Living Dead	1985	Dan O'Bannon	
Return of the Living Dead 3	1993	Brian Yuzna	
Return to Horror High	1987	Bill Froehlich	
Revenant	1998	Richard Elfman	
Revenge	Unknown	Unknown	
The Revenge of Frankenstein	1958	Terence Fisher	
The Rezort	2015	Steve Barker	
Riddles of the Sphinx	2008	George Mendeluk	
Riding the Bullet	2004	Mick Garris	
The Risen	2003	Jeff Beesley	
Rise of the Dead	2007	William Wedig	
Rites of Spring	2011	Padraig Reynolds	
Road Games	2015	Abner Pastoll	
Road Train	2010	Dean Francis	
Rollerball	2002	John McTiernan	
Romasanta: The Werewolf Hunt	2004	Paco Plaza	
The Room	2006	Giles Daoust	
Roswell: The Aliens Attack	1999	Peter Lhotka	
Rupture	2016	Steven Shainberg	

=== S ===
Title	Year	Director	Ref.
Sabretooth	2002	James D.R. Hickox	
Sacred Flesh	1999	Nigel Wingrove	
Sacrifice Akathe White Dog Sacrifice	2005	Michael Flaman	
The Salena Incident	2007	Dustin Rikert	
Salvage	2009	Lawrence Gough	
The Sand	2015	Isaac Gabaeff	
Sarah Landon and the Paranormal Hour	2007	Lisa Comrie	
Satanic	2006	Dan Golden	
The Satanic Rites of Dracula	1973	Alan Gibson	
Satan's Little Helper	2004	Jeff Lieberman	
Satan's School for Girls	2000	Christopher Leitch	
Saturn 3	1980	Stanley Donen	
The Savage Bees	1976	Bruce Geller	
Savage Streets	1984	Danny Steinmann	
Savaged	2013	Michael S. Ojeda	
Savages Crossing	2011	Kevin James Dobson	
Saw V	2008	David Hackl	
Saw VI	2009	Kevin Greutert	
Sawney: Flesh of Man	2012	Ricky Wood	
Scanner Cop	1994	Pierre David	
Scanners	1981	David Cronenberg	
Scar	2005	Rahil Bhorania	
Scarred	2005	Jon Hoffman & Dave Rock	
Scars of Dracula	1970	Roy Ward Baker	
Scary or Die	2012	Bob Badway, Michael Emanuel & Igor Meglic	
Scorpious Gigantus	2006	Tommy Withrow	
Screamers	1995	Christian Duguay	
Season of the Hunted	2003	Ron Sperling	
Season of the Witch	2011	Dominic Sena	
The Seasoning House	2013	Paul Hyett	
Secret Window	2004	David Koepp	
See No Evil	2006	Gregory Dark	
See No Evil 2	2014	The Soska Sisters	
Seed	2007	Uwe Boll	
Seed of Chucky	2004	Don Mancini	
Serial Killer	1999	Thomas Haden Church	
Seventh Moon	2008	Eduardo Sánchez	
Severance	2006	Christopher Smith	
Shades of Darkness	2000	Christopher Johnson	
Shadow Walkers	2013	Dennis Iliadis	
Shadow: Dead Riot	2006	Derek Wan	
Sharknado	2013	Thunder Levin	
Sharknado 2: The Second One	2014	Thunder Levin	
Sharknado 5: Global Swarming	2017	Thunder Levin & Scotty Mullen	
Sharknado: The 4th Awakens	2016	Thunder Levin	
Sharkzilla (version unknown)	2004 or 2012		
Sherlock Holmes	2010	Rachel Lee Goldenberg	
Shivers	1975	David Cronenberg	
Shockwave	2005	Jim Wynorski (as Jay Andrews)	
The Shout	1978	Jerzy Skolimowski	
Shredder	2003	Greg Huson	
The Shrine	2010	Jon Knautz	
Shrooms	2007	Paddy Breathnach	
Shuttle	2008	Edward Anderson	
The Signal	2007	David Bruckner, Dan Bush & Jacob Gentry	
Silent Hill	2006	Christophe Gans	
Silent Night, Deadly Night	1984	Charles E. Sellier, Jr.	
Silent Predators	1999	Noel Nosseck	
Silent Scream	2005	Matt Cantu & Lance Kawas	
Sinbad and the War of the Furies	2016	Scott Wheeler	
The Sinful Dwarf	1973	Vidal Raski	
The Sinful Nuns of Saint Valentine	1974	Sergio Grieco	
Sinister	2012	Scott Derrickson	
Siren	2016	Gregg Bishop	
Sisters	1973	Brian De Palma	
Skew	2011	Sevé Schelenz	
Skinwalkers	2007	James Isaac	
The Skull	1965	Freddie Francis	
Skyline	2010	Brothers Strause	
The Slaughterhouse Massacre	2005	Paul Gagné	
Slaughter High	1986	George Dugdale, Mark Ezra & Peter Litten	
Slayer	2006	Kevin VanHook	
Sleepaway Camp	1983	Robert Hiltzik	
Sleepaway Camp II: Unhappy Campers	1988	Michael A. Simpson	
Sleepaway Camp III: Teenage Wasteland	1989	Michael A. Simpson	
Sleeping Beauty	2014	Casper Van Dien	
Sleepless	2001	Dario Argento	
Sleepwalkers	1992	Mick Garris	
Slugs	1988	Juan Piquer Simón	
The Slumber Party Massacre	1982	Amy Holden Jones	
Slumber Party Massacre II	1987	Deborah Brock	
Slumber Party Massacre III	1990	Sally Mattison	
Small Town Folk	2007	Peter Stanley-Ward	
Smash Cut	2009	Lee Demarbre	
Smiley	2012	Michael Gallagher	
The Snake Woman	1961	Sidney J. Furie	
Snakehead Terror	2004	Paul Ziller	
Snapshot	1979	Simon Wincer	
Snow Beast	2011	Brian Brough	
Snow Demon	2008	Paul Ziller	
Snowbeast	1977	Herb Wallerstein	
Snowmageddon	2011	Sheldon Wilson	
Society	1989	Brian Yuzna	
Solar Attack	2006	Paul Ziller	
Solar Destruction	2008	Fred Olen Ray	
Solstice	2008	Daniel Myrick	
Some Kind of Hate	2015	Adam Egypt Mortimer	
Somebody Help Me	2007	Chris Stokes	
Something Evil	1972	Steven Spielberg	
Sometimes They Come Back... Again	1996	Adam Grossman	
Sometimes They Come Back... for More	1998	Daniel Zelik Berk	
Sorority Girls and the Creature from Hell	1990	John McBrearty	
Sorority House Massacre	1986	Carol Frank	
Sorority House Massacre II	1990	Jim Wynorski	
Sorority Row	2009	Stewart Hendler	
Soul Survivors	2001	Stephen Carpenter	
The Source (a.k.a. The Secret Craft)	2002	S. Lee Taylor	
Southbound	2015	Radio Silence, David Bruckner & Patrick Horvath	
Spacehunter: Adventures in the Forbidden Zone	1983	Lamont Johnson	
Spiders 3D	2013	Tibor Takács	
Spirit Trap	2005	David Smith	
Splice	2009	Vincenzo Natali	
Splinter	2008	Toby Wilkins	
Splintered	2010	Simeon Halligan	
Spooks Run Wild	1941	Phil Rosen	
Squeal	2008	Tony Swansey	
StagKnight	2007	Simon Cathcart	
Stag Night	2008	Peter A. Dowling	
Stag Night of the Dead	2010	Neil Jones	
Stalker	2010	Martin Kemp	
Star Runners	2009	Mat King	
Starman	1984	John Carpenter	
Starry Eyes	2014	Kevin Kölsch & Dennis Widmyer	
Stealing Candy	2003	Mark L. Lester	
The Stendhal Syndrome	1996	Dario Argento	
The Stepfather	1987	Joseph Ruben	
The Stepfather	2009	Nelson McCormick	
The Stepford Children	1987	Alan J. Levi	
Stephen King's Thinner	1996	Tom Holland	
Stir of Echoes	1999	David Koepp	
Stir of Echoes: The Homecoming	2007	Ernie Barbarash	
Stitches	2012	Conor McMahon	
Stonehenge Apocalypse	2010	Paul Ziller	
Storage	2009	Michael Craft	
Storm Warning	2007	Jamie Blanks	
Straight On till Morning	1972	Peter Collinson	
Strange Behaviour	1981	Michael Laughlin	
Street Trash	1987	J. Michael Muro	
The Stuff	1985	Larry Cohen	
Stung	2015	Benni Diez	
Summer of Fear	1978	Wes Craven	
Summer Camp	2015	Alberto Marini	
Super Shark	2011	Fred Olen Ray	
Superstition	2001	Kenneth Hope	
Surviving Evil	2009	Terence Daw	
Survival of the Dead	2009	George A. Romero	
Swamp Thing	1982	Wes Craven	
Swarmed	2005	Paul Ziller	
Switchblade Romance	2003	Alexandre Aja	

=== T ===
Title	Year	Director	Ref.
Tales from the Crypt	1972	Freddie Francis	
Tales from the Crypt: Bordello of Blood	1996	Gilbert Adler	
Tales from the Darkside: The Movie	1990	John Harrison	
Tamara	2005	Jeremy Haft	
The Tattooist	2007	Peter Burger	
Teen Monster	2000	Mitch Marcus & John Blush (uncredited)	
Teeth	2007	Mitchell Lichtenstein	
Tenebrae	1982	Dario Argento	
Tequila Body Shots	1999	Tony Shyu	
Terminal Error	2002	John Murlowski	
Terminal Invasion	2002	Sean S. Cunningham	
Termination Point	2007	Jason Bourque	
The Terminators	2009	Xavier S. Puslowski	
Terrifier	2016	Damien Leone	
The Terror (version unknown)			
Terror at the Opera	1987	Dario Argento	
Terror Firmer	1999	Lloyd Kaufman	
Terror Peak	2003	Dale G. Bradley	
Terror Trap	2010	Dan Gracia	
Terrordactyl	2016	Don Bitters III & Geoff Reisner	
The Texas Chain Saw Massacre	1974	Tobe Hooper	
Texas Chainsaw	2013	John Luessenhop	
Texas Chainsaw Massacre: The Next Generation	1994	Kim Henkel	
The Thaw	2009	Mark A. Lewis	
Theatre of Death	1967	Samuel Gallu	
They Came from Beyond Space	1967	Freddie Francis	
They Crawl	2001	John Allardyce	
They Live	1988	John Carpenter	
They Wait	2007	Ernie Barbarash	
The Thing	1982	John Carpenter	
The Thing from Another World	1951	Christian Nyby	
Thir13en Ghosts	2001	Steve Beck	
Thirst	2015	Greg Kiefer	
The Thirst	2006	Jeremy Kasten	
This Island Earth	1955	Joseph M. Newman & Jack Arnold	
Three	2005	Stewart Raffill	
Ticks	1993	Tony Randel	
Timber Falls	2007	Tony Giglio	
To the Devil a Daughter	1976	Peter Sykes	
Toolbox Murders	2004	Tobe Hooper	
Tomb Invader	2018	James Thomas	
Tony	2009	Gerard Johnson	
The Torment	2010	Andrew Cull & Stee Isles	
Tornado Warning	2012	Jeff Burr	
Torture Garden	1967	Freddie Francis	
The Tortured	2010	Robert Lieberman	
Total Reality	1967	Phillip J. Roth	
The Toxic Avenger	1984	Michael Herz & Lloyd Kaufman (credited as Samuel Weil)	
The Toxic Avenger Part II	1989	Lloyd Kaufman & Michael Herz	
The Toxic Avenger Part III: The Last Temptation of Toxie	1989	Lloyd Kaufman & Michael Herz	
The Toybox	2018	Tom Nagel	
Tower Block	2012	James Nunn & Ronnie Thompson	
Trail of the Screaming Forehead	2007	Larry Blamire	
Trailer Park of Terror	2008	Steven Goldmann	
Transmorphers	2007	Leigh Scott	
Transmorphers: Fall of Man	2009	Shane Van Dyke	
Trapped in Space	1995	Arthur Allan Seidelman	
Trauma	1993	Dario Argento	
Trees: The Movie	2000	Michael Pleckaitis	
Tremors	1990	Ron Underwood	
Tremors 2: Aftershocks	1996	S. S. Wilson	
Tremors 3: Back to Perfection	2001	Brent Maddock	
The Trial of the Incredible Hulk	1989	Bill Bixby	
Triangle	2009	Christopher Smith	
Triassic Attack	2010	Colin Ferguson	
Trick or Treat	1986	Charles Martin Smith	
Triloquist	2008	Mark Jones	
The Tripper	2006	David Arquette	
Troll	1986	John Carl Buechler	
Troll 2	1990	Claudio Fragasso	
Tucker & Dale vs. Evil	2010	Eli Craig	
Turkey Shoot	1982	Brian Trenchard-Smith	
Turbo Kid	2015	François Simard, Anouk Whissell & Yoann-Karl Whissell	
Twelve	2008	Michael A. Nickles	
Twin Peaks: Fire Walk with Me	1992	David Lynch	
Twins of Evil	1971	John Hough	
Two Evil Eyes	1990	Dario Argento & George A. Romero	
The Two Faces of Dr. Jekyll	1960	Terence Fisher	
Two Thousand Maniacs!	1964	Herschell Gordon Lewis	
The Two Orphan Vampires	1997	Jean Rollin	

=== U ===
Title	Year	Director	Ref.
UKM: The Ultimate Killing Machine	2006	David Mitchell	
Ultraviolet	2006	Kurt Wimmer	
The Unborn	1991	Rodman Flender	
The Unborn 2	1991	Rick Jacobson	
The Uncanny	1977	Claude Héroux	
Undead or Alive	2007	Glasgow Phillips	
Underground	2011	Rafael Eisenman	
Underworld	1985	George Pavlou	
The Uninvited	2008	Bob Badway	
Urban Legend	1998	Jamie Blanks	
Urban Legends: Bloody Mary	2005	Mary Lambert	
Urban Legends: Final Cut	2000	John Ottman	

=== V ===
Title	Year	Director	Ref.
V/H/S	2012	Various (see film)	
Vampire Bats	2005	Eric Bross	
Vampire Journals	1997	Ted Nicolaou	
Vampires	1998	John Carpenter	
Vampires Vs. Zombies	2004	Vince D'Amato	
Vampyr	1932	Carl Theodor Dreyer	
Velocity Trap	1997	Phillip J. Roth	
Vendetta	2015	Soska Sisters	
Venus in Furs	1969	Jesús Franco	
Victor Crowley	2017	Adam Green	
Village of the Damned	1960	Wolf Rilla	
Village of the Damned	1995	John Carpenter	
Viral	2016	Ariel Schulman & Henry Joost	
Virtual Nightmare	2000	Michael Pattinson	
The Visitation	2006	Robby Henson	
Vlad	2003	Michael D. Sellers	
Voodoo Moon	2006	Kevin VanHook	

=== W ===
Title	Year	Director	Ref.
WΔZ	2007	Tom Shankland	
War Games: At the End of the Day	2010	Cosimo Alema	
The Wasp Woman	1959	Roger Corman & Jack Hill	
The Watermen	2011	Matt L. Lockhart	
Walled In	2009	Gilles Paquet-Brenner	
Wake Wood	2009	David Keating	
The War of the Worlds	1953	Byron Haskin	
War of the Worlds 2: The Next Wave	2008	C. Thomas Howell	
Warbirds	2008	Kevin Gendreau	
Warlock	1989	Steve Miner	
Warlords of Atlantis	1978	Kevin Connor	
Warrior Angels	2002	Byron W. Thompson	
Warriors of Terra	2006	Robert Wilson	
Wasting Away	2007	Matthew Kohnen	
Waxwork	1988	Anthony Hickox	
Welcome to the Jungle	2007	Jonathan Hensleigh	
The Werewolf Reborn!	1998	Jeff Burr	
Werewolves on Wheels	1971	Michel Levesque	
When a Stranger Calls	2006	Simon West	
Where the Devil Hides	2014	Christian E. Christiansen	
The Wicker Man	1973	Robin Hardy	
The Wicker Tree	2011	Robin Hardy	
Wild Grizzly	2000	Sean McNamara	
Wilderness	2006	Michael J. Bassett	
The Wisher	2002	Gavin Wilding	
Wishmaster: The Prophecy Fulfilled	2002	Chris Angel	
The Witches	1966	Cyril Frankel	
Witchfinder General	1968	Michael Reeves	
Witchville	2010	Pearry Reginald Teo	
The Wizard of Gore	2007	Jeremy Kasten	
Wolf Creek	2005	Greg McLean	
Wolf Creek 2	2013	Greg McLean	
The Wolf Man	1941	George Waggner	
Wolves	2014	David Hayter	
World of the Dead: The Zombie Diaries	2011	Michael Bartlett; Kevin Gates	
The Wounded	2003	John Azpilicueta	
Wreckage	2010	John Mallory Asher	
Wrestlemaniac	2006	Jesse Baget	
Wrong Turn 6: Last Resort	2014	Valeri Milev	

=== X ===
Title	Year	Director	Ref.
Xmoor	2014	Luke Hyams	
Xtro	1983	Harry Bromley Davenport	

=== Y ===
Title	Year	Director	Ref.
You're Next	2011	Adam Wingard	

=== Z ===
Title	Year	Director	Ref.
Zodiac: Signs of the Apocalypse	2014	David Sanderson	
Zoltan, Hound of Dracula	1978	Albert Band	
Zombie Creeping Flesh	1980	Bruno Mattei	
Zombie Flesh Eaters	1979	Lucio Fulci	
Zombie Flesh Eaters 2	1988	Lucio Fulci	
Zombie Flesh Eaters 3	1988	Claudio Fragasso	
Zombie Dearest	2009	David Kemker	
Zombie King	2003	Stacey Case	
The Zombie King	2012	Aidan Belizaire	
Zombie Lake	1981	Jean Rollin & Julian de Laserna	
Zombie Strippers	2008	Jay Lee	
Zombie Town	2007	Damon Lemay	
Zombie Virus of Mulberry Street	2006	Jim Mickle	
Zombie Women of Satan	2009	Steve O'Brien; Warren Speed	
Zombies! Zombies! Zombies!	2008	Jason M. Murphy	

=== Short films ===
Title	Year	Director	Ref.
The Catchment	2016	Ross Noble	
Do You See What I See?	2015	Justin McConnell & Serena Whitney	

== HorrorXtra (2022–2023) ==
In June 2022, Horror was split into two new channels by CBS-AMC Networks, Legend and HorrorXtra, with HorrorXtra continuing to broadcast a mix of horror cinema, suspense films, futuristic fantasy and science fiction films alongside series such as Battlestar Galactica and Mutant X.

=== List of films broadcast by HorrorXtra in 2022 ===
- Descent (2005 Terry Cunningham)
- Discarnate (2018 Mario Sorrenti)
- Ice Quake (2010 Paul Ziller)
- Matriarch (2019 Scott Vickers)
- The Rezort (2015 Steve Barker)
- Rupture (2016 Steven Shainberg)
- Shark Season (2020 Jared Cohn)
