= Steven Rosenblum =

American film editor

- Occupation: Film editor

Steven Rosenblum is an American film editor with over twenty feature film credits dating from 1987. He has had an extended, notable collaboration with the director Edward Zwick, and has edited all of his films since Glory (1989).

== Life and career ==
Rosenblum is a 1976 graduate of the American Film Institute Conservatory. His collaborator Edward Zwick was a 1975 graduate.

Among the films edited by Rosenblum are Dangerous Beauty (1998), X-Men (2000), and Failure to Launch (2006).

Rosenblum has won two American Cinema Editors "Eddie Awards" for Glory and for Braveheart (1995). He has been nominated three times for the Academy Award for Best Film Editing (for Glory, Braveheart, and Blood Diamond).

Rosenblum has been elected to membership in the American Cinema Editors, and is the 2011 recipient of the Franklin J. Schaffner Alumni Medal of the American Film Institute Conservatory.

== Filmography ==
Editor
Year	Film	Director	Notes
1987	Steele Justice	Robert Boris	
1987	Wild Thing	Max Reid	
1989	Glory	Edward Zwick	First collaboration with Edward Zwick
1993	Jack the Bear	Marshall Herskovitz	First collaboration with Marshall Herskovitz
1994	Legends of the Fall	Edward Zwick	Second collaboration with Edward Zwick
1995	Braveheart	Mel Gibson	First collaboration with Mel Gibson
1996	Courage Under Fire	Edward Zwick	Third collaboration with Edward Zwick
1998	Dangerous Beauty	Marshall Herskovitz	Second collaboration with Marshall Herskovitz
1998	The Siege	Edward Zwick	Fourth collaboration with Edward Zwick
2000	X-Men	Bryan Singer	
2001	Pearl Harbor	Michael Bay	
2002	The Four Feathers	Shekhar Kapur	
2003	The Last Samurai	Edward Zwick	Fifth collaboration with Edward Zwick
2005	XXX: State of the Union	Lee Tamahori	
2006	Failure to Launch	Tom Dey	
2006	Blood Diamond	Edward Zwick	Sixth collaboration with Edward Zwick
2008	Journey to the Center of the Earth	Eric Brevig	
2008	Defiance	Edward Zwick	Seventh collaboration with Edward Zwick
2009	Notorious	George Tillman Jr.	
2010	Love & Other Drugs	Edward Zwick	Eighth collaboration with Edward Zwick
2012	Get the Gringo	Adrian Grünberg	
2013	After Earth	M. Night Shyamalan	
2014	Pawn Sacrifice	Edward Zwick	Ninth collaboration with Edward Zwick
2016	The Birth of a Nation	Nate Parker	
2016	Blood Father	Jean-François Richet	
2016	The Promise	Terry George	
2017	Woman Walks Ahead	Susanna White	
2018	Trial by Fire	Edward Zwick	Tenth collaboration with Edward Zwick
2021	Lansky	Eytan Rockaway	
2022	Medieval	Petr Jákl	
2022	On the Come Up	Sanaa Lathan	
2025	Flight Risk	Mel Gibson	Second collaboration with Mel Gibson

Editorial department
Year	Film	Director	Role	Notes
1980	Getting Wasted	Paul Frizler	Dailies editor	
1981	Liar's Moon	David Fisher	Assistant film editor	
1982	Some Kind of Hero	Michael Pressman	Assistant editor	
1985	The Journey of Natty Gann	Jeremy Kagan	Additional film editor	
1987	Extreme Prejudice	Walter Hill	Assistant editor	
1988	Elvira: Mistress of the Dark	James Signorelli	Additional film editor	
2001	Enemy at the Gates	Jean-Jacques Annaud	Additional editor	
2001	Spy Game	Tony Scott	Editorial consultant	
2009	Public Enemies	Michael Mann	Additional editor	
2016	Blood Father	Jean-François Richet	Additional editor	Uncredited

Music department
Year	Film	Director	Role
2014	Pawn Sacrifice	Edward Zwick	Music supervisor

Thanks
Year	Film	Director	Role
2008	Righteous Kill	Jon Avnet	Special thanks

TV series

Editor
Year	Title	Notes
1989	Dream Street	1 episode
1987−90	Thirtysomething	12 episodes

Director
Year	Title
1999	Animal Minds

== See also ==
- List of film director and editor collaborations
