= Insecticide (disambiguation) =

Insecticide is a chemical used to control insects

Insecticide may refer to:

- Insecticide (video game), a 2008 story-driven action-adventure game by Crackpot Entertainment and published by Gamecock Media Group for the Nintendo DS and Windows.

== See also ==
- Incesticide, an album by Nirvana
- Insecticidal, a 2005 horror movie
