= Meghan Heffern =

Canadian actress

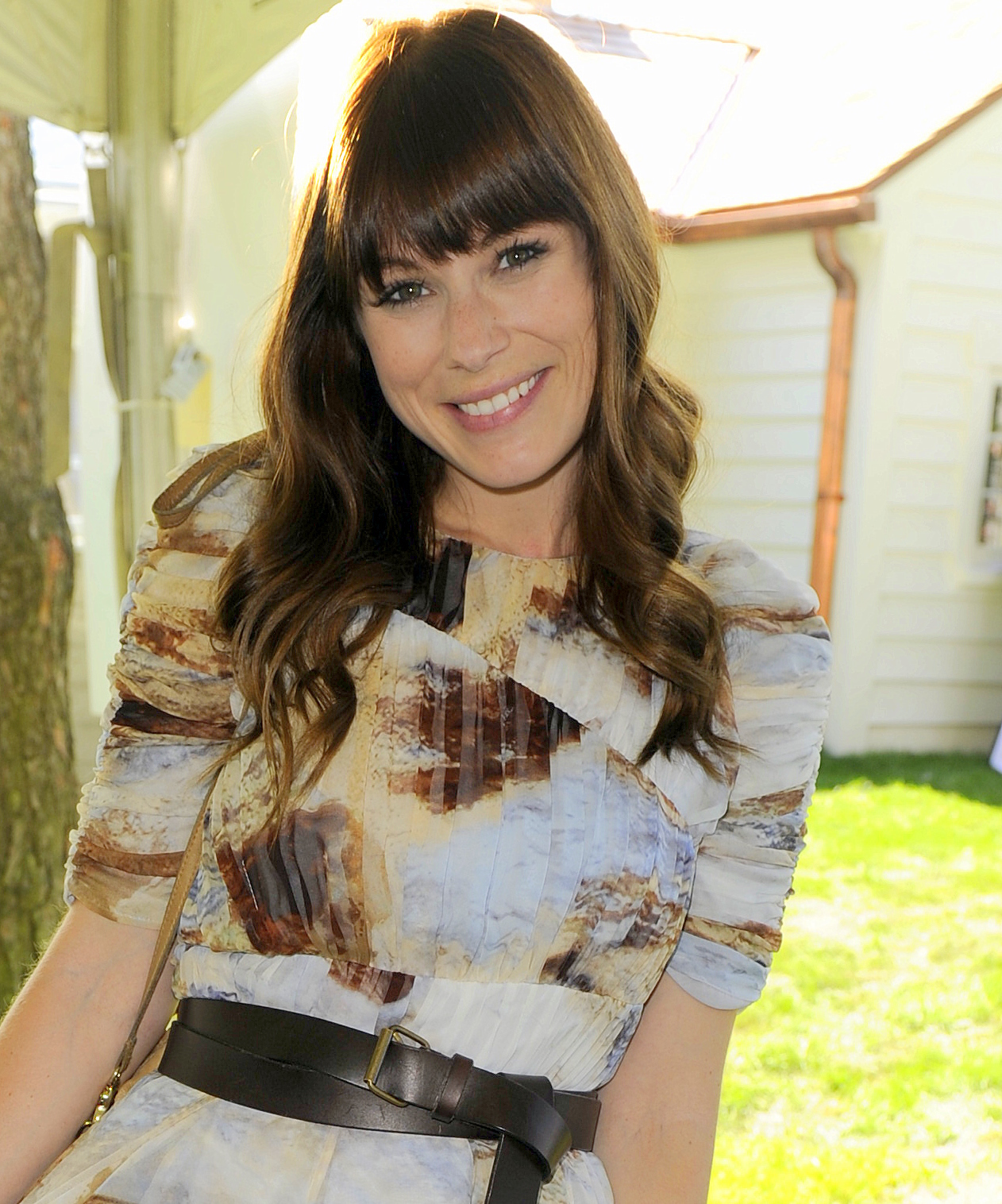
- Heffern in 2009
- Born: October 3, 1983 (age 42); Edmonton, Alberta, Canada
- Occupation: Actress
- Years active: 2004–present

Meghan Heffern (born October 3, 1983) is a Canadian actress. She was born in Edmonton, Alberta, and lives in Vancouver, British Columbia.

== Filmography ==
=== Film ===
Year	Title	Role	Notes
2005	Insecticidal	Cami	
2005	The Fog	Jennifer	
2007	American Pie Presents: Beta House	Ashley Thomas	Direct-to-DVD
2009	Chloe	Miranda	
2010	The Shrine	Sara	
2012	Old Stock	Dahlia	
2013	Home Sweet Home	Sara	
2013	The F Word	Tabby	
2014	Americanistan	Allie	Short
2014	Merry Ex-Mas	Michelle	
2014	E.M.S.	Patricia	
2015	Let's Rap	Lisa	
2016	A Sunday Kind of Love	Tracy	
2016	Special Correspondents	Virginia	
2016	Chokeslam	Evelyn DeWilde	
2017	Breakdown	Gwen	Short
2018	Red Rover	Beatrice	
2026	Remarkably Bright Creatures	Young Tova	

=== Television ===
Year	Title	Role	Notes
2006	Flight 93	Nicole Miller	TV film
2007	Lovebites	Tess	TV series
2007	Conspiracy	Jordan	Episode: "Pilot"
2009	Wild Roses	Jenna Hart	Episode: "Friends and Rivals"
2010	Aaron Stone	Jo	Recurring role (season 2)
2010–2011	Blue Mountain State	Kate	Recurring role
2011	Almost Home	Candi	Main role
2011–2012	Mudpit	Sweetie	Episodes: "Almost Mudpit", "Agony of Default", "The Avatarts"
2012	Degrassi: The Next Generation	Summer	Episodes: "Not Ready to Make Nice: Part 1 & 2"
2012	I, Martin Short, Goes Home	Mini Princess	TV film
2012	The Wife He Met Online	Chelsea Lachance	TV film
2013	Lost Girl	Tabitha	Episode: "Fae-de to Black"
2013–2015	Backpackers	Beth	Main role
2014	Road Trip	Sarah	Main role
2015	Reign	Annabelle	Episode: "Abandoned"
2015	Rookie Blue	Eliza	Episode: "Letting Go"
2015	Patriot	Lori	Episode: "Milwaukee, America"
2016	Good Witch	Alexis	Episodes: "Surprise Me", "Risk"
2016	American Gothic	Kerry Treadwell	Episode: "Jack-in-the-Pulpit"
2016	Serialized	Julia	TV film
2016	Journey Back to Christmas	Louise	TV film
2017	Wynonna Earp	Beth Gardner	Recurring role (season 2)
2017	Designated Survivor	Maya Dunning	Episode: "Equilibrium"
2017	Christmas Wedding Planner	Marianne Kemp	TV film
2017–2019	How to Buy a Baby	Jane	Main role
2018	Unreal	Sofia	Recurring role (season 4)
2019	Winter Castle	Lana	TV film
2020	The Good Doctor	Nathalie Beauchemin	Episode: "Heartbreak"
2020	Love at Sunset Terrace	Christine	TV film
2021–2023	Sex/Life	Caroline	Recurring role
