= Captains' Logs Supplemental: The Unauthorized Guide to the New Trek Voyages =

Captains' Logs Supplemental: The Unauthorized Guide to the New Trek Voyages is a 1996 book written by Edward Gross and Mark A. Altman.

== Contents ==
Captains' Logs Supplemental: The Unauthorized Guide to the New Trek Voyages is a book in which an expanded entry continues the series of behind-the-scenes Star Trek reference books. This updated volume spans all seasons of Deep Space Nine and Voyager, including cast and crew interviews, episode guides, and coverage of Star Trek: First Contact. It now features a proper index, and reuses some material from the authors' previous guides.

== Reception ==
Karen Levell reviewed Captains' Logs Supplemental for Arcane magazine, rating it a 7 out of 10 overall, and stated that "providing you're not too picky about your piccies, this is certainly an interesting peek at the history of the two shows. It's not as glossy as the official Making of Deep Space Nine, but with that now sadly out of print, this could well be the best deal you'll get from a fat Ferengi this year."

== Reviews ==
- Review by Neil Jones (1997) in Interzone, June 1997
