= The Girl in the River =

- Directed by: Brando Benetton
- Written by: Brando Benetton
- Produced by: Joe Lemmon; Andrew Stevens
- Starring: Maggie Grace; Devon Sawa; Tiffany Haddish; Ralph Macchio
- Cinematography: David Matthews
- Edited by: Zach Prichard
- Music by: Max Aruj; W.F. Smith Leithart
- Production companies: Andrew Stevens Entertainment; Black Diamond Films; Eyevox Entertainment; Highland Film Group
- Distributed by: Samuel Goldwyn Films
- Release date: September 4, 2026
- Running time: 92 minutes
- Country: United States
- Language: English

The Girl in the River is a 2026 American mystery crime thriller drama film written and directed by Brando Benetton and starring Maggie Grace, Devon Sawa, Tiffany Haddish and Ralph Macchio. It is Benetton’s feature directorial debut.

== Plot ==
A 14-year-old girl is murdered and thrown from a bridge in Vicksburg into the Mississippi river below. She has not been sexually assaulted, but has had her teeth smashed after the murder but before being dumped. Alan Kramer is a seasoned detective with retirement on his mind. He is grieving the loss of his son Logan, who died 6 years previously. Amelia Pembrock is a recent graduate from the Mississippi Department of Education trained in forensic psychology. Her first assignment is that of the murdered 14-year-old girl thrown from the bridge. Her twin sister is missing and Amelia and Alan reluctantly team up to find out what happened to the murdered girl and find the missing girl. All the evidence seems to point to the local butcher. The inordinate amount of attention he receives from the town folk has a detrimental effect on his life. The local ME, Colin Ripley, is helping on the case, but is hiding a dark secret.

== Cast ==
- Maggie Grace as Amelia Pembrock
- Devon Sawa as Alan Kramer
- Tiffany Haddish as Erica Graysmith
- Ralph Macchio as Colin Ripley
- Andrew Stevens as Arthur Otto
- Dylan Robinson as Mark Stewart

== Production ==
In August 2025, it was announced that filming entered production in Mississippi. Filming occurred in Vicksburg and Canton.

== Release ==
The film was released on September 4, 2026.

== Reception ==
The film has an 8% rating on Rotten Tomatoes based on 12 reviews.

Frank Scheck of The Hollywood Reporter gave the film a negative review and wrote as the bottom line: “Dead in the water.”

Brian Tallerico of RogerEbert.com awarded the film half a star out of four.
