= Jeremy Kasten =

American film director

- Born: Jeremy Craig Kasten; March 25, 1971 (age 55); Baltimore, Maryland, U.S.
- Education: Emerson College (Boston, Massachusetts)
- Website: Official website

Jeremy Craig Kasten (born March 25, 1971) is an American film director, screenwriter, producer and film editor. Kasten is best known for his arthouse horror pieces, which range from psychological horror films such as The Attic Expeditions (2001) and The Dead Ones (2010), to Grand Guignol (such as his re-imagining of Herschell Gordon Lewis’s classic splatter film The Wizard of Gore (2007), and his contribution to the horror anthology film The Theatre Bizarre (2011)). Other work includes the zombie film All Soul’s Day: Dia de los Muertos (2005) and the drug-fueled vampire film The Thirst (2006).

== Early life ==
Jeremy Kasten was born in Baltimore, Maryland, and he grew up performing in local television and theater with his family. He attended the Baltimore School for the Arts where he was in an acting ensemble with Tupac Shakur and Jada Pinkett. In his junior year of high school Kasten and his friends (street artist Maya Hayuk and producer Daniel Griffiths) appeared in John Waters’s film Hairspray.

Kasten attended Emerson College in Boston, Massachusetts where he completed work on his first Indie film, Off the Road, during his sophomore year. The film was shot on VHS on the weekends, and featured a crew of local talent and Emerson students. The film screened at the First Church of Boston. In 1992, Kasten moved to Los Angeles on an Emerson internship program, but soon began to work various roles in film crews while he learned the craft of film editing.

== Career ==
=== Film ===
Before starting work on his own feature films, Kasten worked odd jobs in the film industry, including as William Friedkin’s personal assistant during production of Jailbreakers (1994) and as video editor for Playboy TV. Soon, Kasten became known for his editing skills and became a go-to editor for straight-to-video distributors and cut over a dozen feature films before the age of 25. He was the last editor on the infamous film Skinner (1993), starring Traci Lords and Ricki Lake, and directed by Ivan Nagy (ex-convict, and ex-boyfriend of Hollywood madam Heidi Fleiss). In this period Kasten edited Phat Beach (1996), which first-time director and Entourage creator Doug Ellin called “probably the worst movie ever made”. Kasten first made his mark with Mindfire/CFQ Entertainment as editor of the superhero spoof The Specials (2000), directed by screenwriter Craig Mazin and featuring Rob Lowe, Thomas Haden Church, Paget Brewster, Judy Greer, Jamie Kennedy and James Gunn, who also wrote the film.

In 1997, Kasten began work on his own feature, The Attic Expeditions (2001), a low budget experimental horror film starring Seth Green and Jeffrey Combs. Tim Heidecker was the intern on the film and has a cameo appearance. The film featured a noted appearance by Alice Cooper as a mental patient. It premiered at the Seattle International Film Festival, played in Los Angeles and later saw wide release on video by distributor Blockbuster/DEJ Entertainment. The movie received mixed reviews due to its complex plot, with Kevin Thomas from the Los Angeles Times saying, “imaginative and audacious. Willing to challenge as well as entertain. A low-budget gem.”

Kasten’s next film, All Soul’s Day: Dia de los Muertos (2005), used the Mexican Day of the Dead as a backdrop for zombie horror. Noted for its three time periods and stars such as Laz Alonso, David Keith, Jeffrey Combs, Laura Harring and Danny Trejo, the film premiered to sold out audiences at the 2005 Slamdance Film Festival. In The Zombie Movie Encyclopedia Peter Dendle described it “like something Barbara Steele should have been in and Mario Bava should have made in black and white.”

The Thirst (2006), Kasten’s third film and second for Starz! Media, is a vampire horror film starring Clare Kramer, Neil Jackson, Jeremy Sisto, Adam Baldwin and Otep. The film, which used over 200 gallons of custom-mixed prop blood in its filming, premiered at the Sitges Fantasy and Horror Festival to a standing ovation. The New York Times called it “Out and out pretension… A vampire movie that tries to say something smart about connections between vampirism, sexuality and drug addiction… Just disgusting.”

In 2007, Kasten released The Wizard of Gore (2007), his vision of the Herschel Gordon Lewis classic The Wizard of Gore (1970) starring Kip Pardue, Crispin Glover, Bijou Phillips, Jeffrey Combs, Brad Dourif and The Suicide Girls. Kasten’s version is a splatter-noir cover in which Los Angeles becomes, according to André Loiselle and Jeremy Maron in their book Stages of Reality: Theatricality in Cinema, "an arena for repulsive, mesmerizing and sexually charged spectacles.” The film premiered at the Los Angeles Film Festival in 2007, where several showings were added due to high demand and sold out seats. It released on August 19, 2008, as a direct to DVD film.

Kasten then co-directed the anthology horror film The Theatre Bizarre (2011), along with directors Buddy Giovinazzo, Tom Savini and Richard Stanley. His wrap-around segments star Udo Kier, and were filmed in the Million Dollar Theater. The film opened the Fantasia International Film Festival in Canada, before touring worldwide.

In 2009, Kasten filmed The Dead Ones; a B-movie made for $600,000, it was not released until a festival appearance in Belgium in 2019, and a DVD release in the United States in September 2020. It is considered something of a cult horror film.

=== Television ===
Kasten has produced and edited dozens of behind-the-scenes specials for studio films, and created and edited multiple reality shows for television. He has directed re-creation shows for networks including A&E Biography and Discovery ID, and directed all episodes of History Channel’s controversial "The Exorcist Files".

=== Theatre ===
When Erika Larsen, the daughter of the founders of The Magic Castle, created the Brookledge Follies in 2008 and reopened her family’s historic Los Angeles Theater, she chose Kasten as its original director. During his tenure at Brookledge, he collaborated with world-renowned variety performers including Penn Jillette, Michael Carbonaro, Ann Magnuson, Billy the Mime, The Lampshades, Kristian Hoffman, Puddles Pity Party and Neil Hamburger.

== Filmography ==
Director

Year	Title	Notes
2001	The Attic Expeditions	
2005	All Souls Day	
2006	The Thirst	Also writer
2007	The Wizard of Gore	Also producer
2011	The Theatre Bizarre	Framing segments
2019	The Dead Ones	

Ref.:

Television

Year	Title	Notes
1999	Here Come Your Enemies	
2005	Starz on the Set: Hitch	TV movie
2007	Starz on the Set: Making Ghost Rider	TV Movie
2007	Starz on the Set: Spider-Man 3	
2011	The Exorcist Files	
2013	I'll Haunt You When I'm Dead	TV Movie
2013	My Haunted Vacation	TV Movie
2014	Devil in the Details	Episode "Mowers" and "Murder, Cajun Style"

Editor

- Surprise Gardener (1998)
- Badge of Courage: Police Officer of the Year (2000) (TV movie)
- Sweeney Todd: The Demon Barber of Fleet Street in Concert (2001) (TV movie)
- Starz on the Set: Inside the Haunted Mansion (2003) (TV Movie)
- Starz on the Set: The Pursuit of Happyness (2006) (TV Movie)
- Starz on the Set: The Karate Kid (2010) (TV Movie)
- Friends with Benefits International Television Special (2011) (TV Movie)
- Starz on the Set: MIB 3 (2012) (TV Movie)
- Starz Studios: After Earth (2013) (TV Movie)
- My Haunted Vacation (2013) (TV Movie)
- Angelus (2013) (TV Movie)
