= Lansky (2021 film) =

2021 crime film by Eytan Rockaway

- Official poster
- Directed by: Eytan Rockaway
- Written by: Eytan Rockaway
- Produced by: Robert Ogden Barnum; Lee Broda; Jeff Hoffman
- Starring: Harvey Keitel; Sam Worthington; AnnaSophia Robb; Minka Kelly; David James Elliott; John Magaro
- Cinematography: Peter Flinckenberg
- Edited by: Steven Rosenblum; Martin Hunter
- Music by: Max Aruj
- Production company: Above the Clouds
- Distributed by: Vertical Entertainment
- Release date: June 25, 2021
- Running time: 119 minutes
- Country: United States
- Language: English
- Budget: $5 million

Lansky is a 2021 American biographical crime drama about the famous gangster Meyer Lansky, written and directed by Eytan Rockaway. It stars Harvey Keitel, Sam Worthington, AnnaSophia Robb, Minka Kelly, David James Elliott, and John Magaro.

It was released on June 25, 2021, by Vertical Entertainment.

== Plot ==
When the aging Meyer Lansky is investigated one last time by the FBI, who suspect he has stashed away millions of dollars over half a century, the retired gangster spins a dizzying tale, revealing the untold truth about his life as the notorious boss of Murder, Inc. and the National Crime Syndicate.

== Cast ==
- Harvey Keitel as Meyer Lansky
  - John Magaro as Young Meyer Lansky
- Sam Worthington as David Stone
- AnnaSophia Robb as Anne Lansky
- Dodge Prince as Young Buddy Lansky
  - Beau Hart as Child Buddy Lansky
- Jackie Cruz as Dafne
- David Cade as Ben Siegel
- David James Elliott as Frank Rivers
- Alon Abutbul as Yoram Alroy
- Minka Kelly as Maureen
- Shane McRae as Lucky Luciano
- James Moses Black as R.J. Campbell
- Claudio Bellante as Joe Bonanno
- Danny A. Abeckaser as Greg Kunz

== Production ==
In May 2019, it was announced Harvey Keitel, Sam Worthington, Emory Cohen, and Austin Stowell had joined the cast of the film, with Alexandra Daddario and Tony Danza in negotiations to join with Eytan Rockaway directing from a screenplay he wrote. In February 2020, it was announced AnnaSophia Robb, Jackie Cruz, John Magaro, David Cade, David James Elliott, Alon Abutbul, and Minka Kelly had joined the cast of the film, with Cohen, Stowell, Daddario, and Danza no longer attached to it.

Principal photography lasted 20 days in Alabama in February 2020.

== Release ==
In May 2021, Vertical Entertainment acquired distribution rights to the film, and set it for a theatrical and on VOD release on June 25, 2021.

== Reception ==
On the review aggregator website Rotten Tomatoes, 66% of 44 critics' reviews are positive, with an average rating of 6.20/10. The website's critics consensus reads, "Harvey Keitel delivers a reliably powerful performance as the title character, but Lansky lets him down with flawed storytelling and an overload of clichés." On Metacritic, the film has a weighted average score of 45 out of 100, based on seven critics, indicating "mixed or average" reviews.

Joe Leydon from Variety wrote "Keitel [...] infuses his performance here with more than enough lion-in-winter gravitas to dominate every moment he is on screen, and quite a few when he isn't." Richard Roeper from Chicago Sun Times said "Harvey Keitel takes a swing at portraying the 'Mob's Accountant' and Keitel is as reliable as he's always been - but while this is a well-filmed and well-acted story, much of the material has been covered in superior movies."
