= The Theatre Bizarre =

- Directed by: Douglas Buck; Buddy Giovinazzo; David Gregory; Karim Hussain; Tom Savini; Richard Stanley; Jeremy Kasten
- Written by: Scarlett Amaris; Douglas Buck; John Esposito; Buddy Giovinazzo; David Gregory; Karim Hussain; Emiliano Ranzani; Richard Stanley
- Produced by: Daryl J Tucker
- Starring: Kaniehtiio Horn; Victoria Maurette; Lena Kleine; Catriona MacColl; Udo Kier; Virginia Newcomb
- Cinematography: Karim Hussain; Eduardo Fierro; John Honoré; Michael Kotschi
- Edited by: Douglas Buck
- Music by: Simon Boswell; Susan DiBona; Marquis Howell of Hobo Jazz
- Distributed by: Severin Films
- Release date: July 16, 2011 (Fantasia)
- Running time: 114 min.
- Country: United States
- Language: English

The Theatre Bizarre is a 2011 American horror anthology film. The six segments are directed by Douglas Buck, Buddy Giovinazzo, David Gregory, Karim Hussain, Tom Savini and Richard Stanley. The wraparound segments featuring Udo Kier were directed by Jeremy Kasten.

== Plot ==
The film contains six stories, each inspired by Paris’ legendary Grand Guignol theatre.

The six stories are presented within a connecting framework, "Theatre Guignol": Enola Penny is intrigued by an abandoned theatre in her neighborhood. One night the theatre door mysteriously opens and she enters. A puppet host (or Guignol) introduces six short films: "The Mother of Toads", "I Love You", "Wet Dreams", "The Accident", "Vision Stains" and "Sweets". As each is shown, the host becomes more human and Enola becomes more puppet-like.

Of the six segments, "I Love You", "Wet Dreams" and "Sweets" match the Grand Guignol genre: physical or psychological conte cruel horror with natural explanations, cynical, amoral, ironic, sexy, or gory in combinations.

=== First Story: The Mother of Toads ===
"The Mother of Toads" is loosely based on a supernatural horror story by Clark Ashton Smith with elements from H.P. Lovecraft's work. Set in France, the story concerns an American anthropologist and his girlfriend who fall victim to a witch known as The Mother of Toads after the witch sells them a pair of Elder Sign earrings and shows the anthropologist a copy of The Necronomicon.

=== Second Story: I Love You ===
"I Love You", set in Berlin, concerns a man who awakes on his bathroom floor with bloodstains around him and deep cuts in his right hand. He is an obsessive man who follows and calls his partner constantly. His partner, a French woman, announces she is leaving him and that she has been unfaithful to him on many occasions and even had an abortion without him knowing. The obsessive nature of the man's love leads to their doom.

=== Third Story: Wet Dreams ===
In "Wet Dreams" a man relates to his psychiatrist recurring nightmares about torture and castration often at the hands of his wife whom he has betrayed and abused.

=== Fourth Story: The Accident ===
In "The Accident" a mother and young daughter drive along a mountain road and come upon a fatal collision between a motorcyclist and a deer. Another biker puts the suffering deer out of its misery with his knife. The mother thoughtfully and poetically answers her daughter's questions about the nature of life and death. Most reviewers note "The Accident" seems out of place yet many describe it as the heart of the film.

=== Fifth Story: Vision Stains ===
"Vision Stains" is about a writer/serial killer who cannot dream. She extracts fluid from her victims' eyes as they die and injects it into her own eye so she can experience the others' lives as they flash by in their dying moments. She then logs it all in her journals. Finally she goes a step further, which leaves her able to dream at last, but at a horrible price.

=== Sixth Story: Sweets ===
"Sweets" is the story of Estelle and Greg, a pair of food fetishists who gorge on sweets, and their break up, which ends at a gourmet cult feast with Greg as the main entree.

== Cast ==
- Udo Kier as Peg Poett
- Virginia Newcomb as Enola Penny
- Kaniehtiio Horn as The Writer (segment "Vision Stains")
- Catriona MacColl as Mere Antoinette (segment "The Mother of Toads")
- Victoria Maurette as Karina (segment "The Mother of Toads")
- Shane Woodward as Martin (segment "The Mother of Toads")
- André Hennicke as Axel (segment "I Love You")
- Suzan Anbeh as Mo (segment "I Love You")
- James Gill as Donnie (segment "Wet Dreams")
- Tom Savini as Dr. Maurey (segment "Wet Dreams")
- Debbie Rochon as Carla (segment "Wet Dreams")
- Lena Kleine as The Mother (segment "The Accident")
- Mélodie Simard as The Daughter (segment "The Accident")
- Lindsay Goranson as Estelle (segment "Sweets")
- Guilford Adams as Greg (segment "Sweets")
- Jeff Dylan Graham as Buzz (segment "Sweets")
- Lynn Lowry as Mikela Da Vinci (segment "Sweets")

== Production ==
The film is a co-production between United States based Severin Films and France based Metaluna Productions. Each director was given the same budget, schedule and narrative directive. Other than that, they were given free rein to create their 10-20 minute segments. Richard Stanley's segment is an adaptation of the short story "Mother of Toads" by Clark Ashton Smith.

== Release ==
When the film played at the Oldenburg International Film Festival in Germany, it was reported that five people passed out at the screenings.

=== Home media ===
The film was released on DVD by Image Entertainment on April 24, 2012, Image later released the film on Blu-ray on September 3, 2013.

== Reception ==
On Rotten Tomatoes, the film holds an approval rating of 44% based on 9 reviews, with a weighted average rating of 4.7/10.

In an excerpt from the July 17, 2011 Fangoria review of the film, written by Michael Gingold, he says, "The many different flavors and tones in The Theatre Bizarre, courtesy of the many distinct talents who took part, means the movie ought to inspire lively debate among fans as to their favorites among the assorted stories. But regardless of your feelings about this or that individual episode, it’s guaranteed you’ll find enough to like to warrant enthusiastically recommending the movie overall." Gareth Jones from Dread Central rated the film a score of 1.5 out of 5, writing " The most interesting piece of filmmaking to be found amongst all of the work on offer here isn’t even a horror film." Brett Gallman from Oh, the Horror! gave it a mixed review, calling the film "uneven". Gallman noted that, although the film had some occasionally great concepts and performances, many of the film's segments "are delivered with a flat, digital aesthetic that also renders them a bit unappealing, visually speaking".

Jason Coffman from Film Monthly called the film "a crushing disappointment", feeling that many of the segments should have been fleshed out more. Coffman did however praise Douglas Buck’s The Accident as being the strongest segment in the film, calling it "a beautiful piece of work". Jason Buchanan from TV Guide gave the film 2/5 stars, writing, "Though it’s difficult to recommend The Theatre Bizarre as a whole, at least three of the featured segments are strong enough to warrant a look from devoted horror fans, with one among them standing out as a mini-masterpiece that transcends the genre altogether." John Anderson of Variety gave the film a mostly positive review, writing, "Deviant, demented and occasionally delicious, The Theatre Bizarre offers a hallucinatory flashback to the heyday of omnibus horror while also making a statement about the art... Not every installment here may be as good as the next, but each has its hideous virtues, which may help the project slip out of the specialty straitjacket and shroud itself in crossover appeal."
