= Brookledge Follies =

American magician

The Brookledge Follies is a variety show presented in a small theater located behind a historic Spanish-style mansion near Hancock Park in Los Angeles, California. Created by Erika Larsen in 2009, the invitation-only show was designed to showcase a wide range of variety talent on an occasional basis. The show was directed in its early years by Jeremy Kasten, often hosted by Rob Zabrecky and employs the musical direction of Kristian Hoffman. Past performers have included Ann Magnuson, Neil Hamburger, the Muffs, Mike Caveney, Tina Lenert, Moby, Steven Banks, Puddles Pity Party and John Lovick
