= All Souls Day (film) =

2005 American zombie film

- Anchor Bay Entertainment DVD Cover
- Directed by: Jeremy Kasten
- Written by: Mark A. Altman
- Produced by: John W. Hyde; Morris Berger
- Starring: Marisa Ramirez; Travis Wester; Nichole Hiltz; Laz Alonso; Jeffrey Combs; Ellie Cornell; David Keith
- Cinematography: Christopher Duddy
- Edited by: Joseph Gutowski
- Music by: Joe Kraemer
- Distributed by: Anchor Bay Entertainment
- Release date: January 22, 2005 (Slamdance Film Festival)
- Running time: 88 minutes
- Country: United States
- Language: English

All Souls Day, or All Souls Day: Dia de los Muertos, is a 2005 American zombie film written by Mark A. Altman and directed by Jeremy Kasten. It premiered at the 2005 Slamdance Film Festival, and the Sci Fi Channel played it on June 11, 2005. There is also an uncut version on DVD.

== Plot ==
In a small Mexican town, Vargas Diaz uncovers a hidden Aztec temple deep in the nearby mine. Luring the townspeople in, he blows up the entrance, trapping those inside forever. In exchange for the sacrificing the townspeople, Vargas receives eternal life.

Years later, a college couple vacationing in Mexico comes across the town, empty of people. After accidentally running into what appears to be a funeral procession, they uncover the deadly truth of the town's past. Every year on the Day of the Dead a human sacrifice is presented at the local church to appease the spirits of the town's original inhabitants; however, this year the couple interferes with their sacrifice. With nothing to appease the dead, they return to kill the transgressors.

Calling two of their friends for help, the four are left to fight off the growing hordes of the undead besieging their hotel, while trying to uncover the secrets hiding within the hotel's rooms.

== Cast ==
- Marisa Ramirez as Alicia
- Travis Wester as Joss
- Nichole Hiltz as Erica
- Laz Alonso as Tyler
- Jeffrey Combs as Thomas White
- Ellie Cornell as Sarah White
- David Keith as Sheriff Blanco
- Laura Harring as Martia
- Danny Trejo as Vargas Diaz
- Mircea Monroe as Lilly White

== Release ==
All Souls Day premiered at the 2005 Slamdance Film Festival. It aired on the Sci Fi Channel on June 11, 2005. Anchor Bay released it on DVD in the US on January 17, 2006.

== Reception ==
Dennis Harvey of Variety wrote that it "sometimes appears to laugh at its own cliches, but mostly it's just dumb." Brad Miska of Bloody Disgusting rated it 1/5 stars and called the execution "breathtakingly bad" despite the interesting premise. Joshua Siebalt of Dread Central rated it 2.5/5 stars and wrote, "All Souls Day ends up being a convoluted mess in the end that goes from mind-numbingly dull to head-spinningly confusing with nary an eye blink." Scott Weinberg of DVD Talk rated it 3/5 stars and recommended it to hardcore horror fans, who are likely to enjoy the campy aspects. David Johnson of DVD Verdict wrote that the film has too many campy scenes and spends too much time attempting to explain its convoluted story.
