= Mark A. Altman =

American film producer

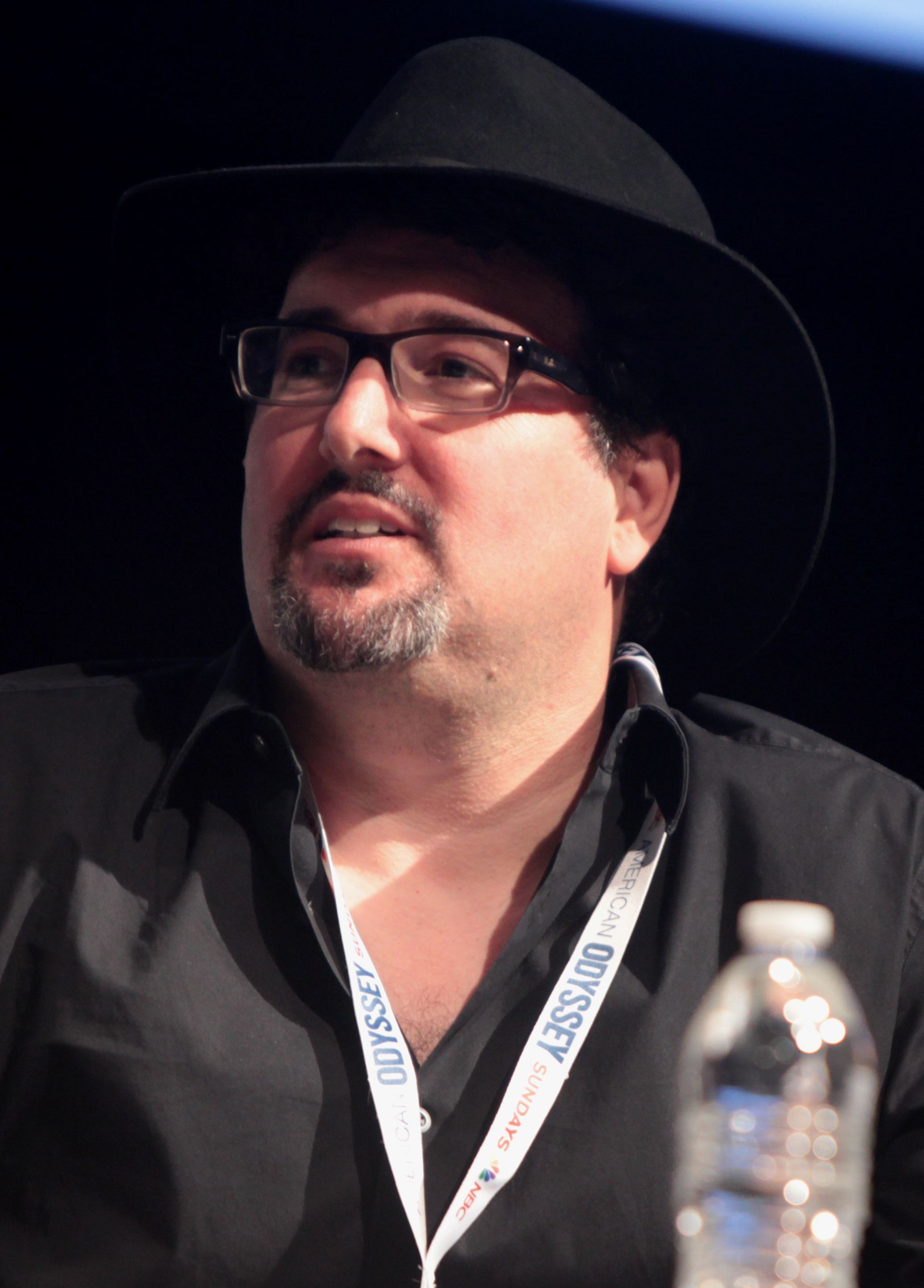
- Altman at WonderCon 2015.
- Occupations: Writer, producer, actor
- Years active: 1995–present

Mark A. Altman is a writer, producer and actor. He is a former Los Angeles bureau chief for Cinefantastique magazine and was also a previous editor in chief of Sci-Fi Universe magazine. He has also been a writer for comic books.

== Credits ==
=== Film ===
- Free Enterprise (writer, producer, actor, 1998)
- Where No Fan Has Gone Before: The Making of Free Enterprise (producer, 1999)
- The Specials (producer, actor, 2000)
- House of the Dead (writer, producer)
- All Souls Day: Dia de los Muertos (writer, producer)
- House of the Dead 2 (writer, producer, actor, 2005)
- CFQ: Cafe FAntastique (executive producer, 2006)
- Room 6 (writer, producer, actor, 2006)
- DOA: Dead or Alive (producer, 2006)
- The Thirst (writer, producer, 2006)
- All Souls Day (writer, producer)
- Dead And Deader (writer, producer, actor, 2006)
- The Darkroom (writer, producer, 2006)
- Monarch (executive producer, 2013)
- Caught on Tape (executive producer, 2013)
- 50 Years of Star Trek (executive producer, 2016)

=== Television ===
- Castle (co-producer, 2009)
- Necessary Roughness (producer, writer, 2011)
- Femme Fatales (executive producer, writer, director, actor, 2011-2012)
- Agent X (co-executive producer, writer, 2015)
- Aries Spears: Comedy Blueprint (director, 2016)
- The Librarians (co-executive producer, writer, 2016-2017)
- Pandora (creator, showrunner, executive producer, 2019-2020)

=== Podcasts ===
- Inglorious Treksperts (co-host, producer, 2018-2019)
- The 4:30 Movie Podcast (co-host, producer, 2019)
- Best Movies Never Made (producer, 2019-2020)

=== Books ===
- Captains' Logs: The Unauthorized Complete Trek Voyages (with Edward Gross, 1995)
- Captains' Logs Supplemental: The Unauthorized Guide to the New Trek Voyages (with Edward Gross, 1996)
- The Fifty-Year Mission: The Complete, Uncensored, Unauthorized Oral History of Star Trek: The First 25 Years (with Edward Gross, 2016)
- The Fifty-Year Mission: The Next 25 Years: From The Next Generation to J.J. Abrams: The Complete, Uncensored, Unauthorized Oral History of Star Trek (with Edward Gross, 2016)
- Slayers & Vampires: The Complete, Uncensored, Unauthorized Oral History of Buffy The Vampire Slayer & Angel (with Edward Gross, 2017)
- So Say We All: The Complete, Uncensored, Unauthorized Oral History of Battlestar Galactica (with Edward Gross, 2018)
- Nobody Does It Better: The Complete, Uncensored, Unauthorized Oral History of James Bond (with Edward Gross, 2020)
- Secrets of the Force: The Complete, Uncensored, Unauthorized Oral History of Star Wars (with Edward Gross, 2021)
- They Shouldn't Have Killed His Dog: The Complete Uncensored Ass-Kicking Oral History of John Wick, Gun Fu, and the New Age of Action (with Edward Gross, 2022)
