= Jim Zulevic =

American actor

- Born: Jim Zulevic; February 20, 1965; Chicago, Illinois, US
- Died: January 7, 2006 (aged 40); Chicago, Illinois, US
- Occupations: Actor; comedian; writer; radio host
- Years active: 1996–2006

Jim Zulevic (February 20, 1965 – January 7, 2006) was an American actor, improvisational comedian, television writer, and radio host. He died suddenly, most likely due to a heart attack, at age 40.

== Early life ==
Zulevic, who was of Croatian heritage, grew up in Chicago, where he graduated from St. Thomas More Grammar School, Brother Rice High School and Columbia College Chicago.

He worked a number of jobs, from bouncer at Chicago's famed Exit Club to a runner at the Board of Trade to support himself. All the while he studied at The Second City, where he was taken under the wing of his mentor, Sheldon Patinkin. Before joining Second City, he performed for a short time at Chicago's Improv Institute.

== Second City ==
Zulevic joined The Second City comedy troupe in 1992. He starred in nine stage revues, including "Paradigm Lost" in 1997 with Tina Fey, Scott Adsit and Rachel Dratch. Zulevic created his most famous character of "Billy" at this time.

== Television ==
Zulevic wrote for the Jamie Kennedy Experiment. He appeared on Curb Your Enthusiasm, The Drew Carey Show, Early Edition, Prison Break, Real Time with Bill Maher, The Shield, and the final episode of the long-running series, Seinfeld.

He also created commercials for the Fox Broadcasting Company in Chicago, where he was known for his quirky comments on reruns of The Simpsons.

== Movies ==
Zulevic appeared in The Bogus Witch Project, 50 Ways to Leave Your Lover, Let's Go to Prison, Matchstick Men, The Specials, and Talent. He also directed a comedy short, Baby Time Share, in 2005.

== Other activities ==
Zulevic hosted the weekly radio show "Second City Radio" on WCKG-FM, and taught improv classes at Columbia College Chicago and The Second City. He was working with Bob Odenkirk on a project based on the July 1979 Disco Demolition Night at Comiskey Park at the time of his death.

== Filmography ==
Year	Title	Role	Notes
1996	Early Edition	Greg Bratcher, Brat Guy / Stockbroker	2 episodes
1998	Seinfeld	Bernie	Episode: "The Finale"
1998	Talent	David	
1999	Time Served	Computer Hacker	TV movie
2000	The Bogus Witch Project	Bob Zombie	TV movie, (segment "In the Woods Segments")
2000	The Specials	Mr. Smart	
2000	The Near Future	Virgil	TV movie
2001	The Drew Carey Show	Earl	2 episodes
2001	Curb Your Enthusiasm	Worker	Episode: "The Car Salesman"
2003	Melvin Goes to Dinner	Minor Role	
2003	Matchstick Men	Bartender	
2004	50 Ways to Leave Your Lover		
2004	The Shield	Detective Camara	Episode: "Posse Up"
2005	Prison Break	ER Doctor	Episode: "Odd Man Out"
2005	Real Time with Bill Maher	Larry Fessman	1 episode
2006	Let's Go to Prison	Sgt. Barker	(final film role)
