= Adam Chaplin =

- Directed by: Giulio De Santi
- Written by: Giulio De Santi
- Produced by: Giulio De Santi
- Starring: Valeria Sannino; Chiara Marfella; Wilmar Zimosa
- Production company: Necrostorm
- Distributed by: Necrostorm
- Release date: 30 September 2011 (Italy)
- Running time: 84 minutes
- Country: Italy
- Languages: Italian; English

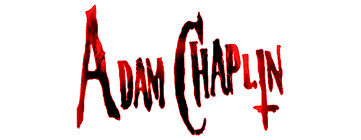
Adam Chaplin movie poster

Adam Chaplin or Adam Chaplin: The Bloody Avenger is a 2011 Italian horror slasher film directed by Giulio De Santi. The film features, Valeria Sannino, Chiara Marfella and Wilmar Zimosa in lead roles.

== Synopsis ==
The film revolves around the fictional country of Heaven Valley, and focuses on a man called Adam Chaplin who is investigating his wife's death. He finds that his wife was burned to death by local gangster Denny Richards, because she owed him some money. He also finds the entire police department of the country is controlled by the mafia, so he summons a demon in a fit of anger. The rest of the film focuses on the revenge of Adam Chaplin with intense, gory fight scenes.

== Cast ==
- Valeria Saninno as Emily
- Chiara Marfella as Denny Richard
- Paolo Luciani as Ben
- Wilmar Zimosa as Mike Carrera
- Giulio De Santi as Derek
- Alessandro Gramanti as Clarence

== Release ==
The film was released as direct-to-video.

=== Home media ===
The film is currently streaming on Amazon Prime Video and Scream Box.

== Sequels ==
Necrostorm, the official production house of the film, has produced a trilogy named "Adam’s Curse". The first film, Adam's Curse: Reborn from Hell, was released in 2026
