= The Attic Expeditions =

2001 film by Jeremy Kasten

- Theatrical release poster
- Directed by: Jeremy Kasten
- Written by: Rogan Russell Marshall
- Produced by: Melissa Balin; David Bouffard; Daniel Gold; Dan Griffiths; Jessica Kopp; Allen R. Larson
- Starring: Andras Jones; Seth Green; Jeffrey Combs; Wendy Robie; Ted Raimi
- Cinematography: Greg Littlewood; Michael Negrin
- Edited by: Barbara Kaplan
- Music by: David Reynolds
- Production company: Tse Tse Fly Productions
- Distributed by: DEJ Productions
- Release date: 2001 (US)
- Country: United States
- Language: English
- Budget: $1,000,000 (estimated)

The Attic Expeditions (also known as Horror in the Attic) is a 2001 horror film directed by Jeremy Kasten and starring Andras Jones and Seth Green, with appearances by Alice Cooper and Ted Raimi.

== Plot ==
Note: The story is explained here in its chronological order, rather than the way it unfolds in the film.

Trevor and Faith are a happy couple who decide to buy a home together. After purchasing their new house, Trevor is cleaning the attic and discovers a chest. In the chest there is a staircase, under which he finds a book of black magic that only he can read. He begins studying the book, and starts to perform rituals with Faith. In an effort to gain even greater power, he and Faith perform a ritual in an attempt to merge their two consciousnesses. The ritual goes wrong, and Faith suffers a violent death. Trevor calls the police.

Four years later, Trevor appears in a hospital. Apparently having been found insane, he is now under the care of Dr. Ek. The doctor has learned about the book Trevor found, and wants to use it for his own means - one of which, he later admits, is to cure all mental illness. It is around this time that Dr. Coffee comes to stay at the sanitarium and study under Dr. Ek. Trevor seems to have forgotten much of his past including practicing black magic and killing Faith. Dr. Ek talks with Trevor, trying to help him regain any previous memories about where Trevor may have hidden the book. At first Ek is very coy about his intentions. He worries that if Trevor knows the value of the book and his intent, he won't willingly surrender it.

Dr. Ek sends Trevor to be rehabilitated at "The House of Love." While Trevor thinks he's being sent to a recovery facility filed with other patients, he is actually being sent to his former house which is now filled with actors pretending to be patients. He interacts with the other patients, and eventually befriends Douglas. While he thinks Douglas is just as oblivious to the strange happenings in the house, Douglas is actually trying to get Trevor to sneak around the house (including the attic) and expose the location of the book. Ronald pretends to confess secrets of the house, hoping it will motivate Trevor to explore more. As Douglas and Trevor's conversations and expeditions continue, Trevor develops an interest in Amy - another supposed patient. While Amy seduces and has sex with Trevor, the first "murder" takes place. As time goes on, several more fake murders are orchestrated in an attempt to build urgency and get Trevor to continue exploring.

Unhappy with his results so far, Dr. Ek commits further surgery on Trevor. As Dr. Coffee's skepticism builds, Dr. Ek also subjects Trevor to several medications and hallucinogens. In his drugged state, Trevor communicates with Faith who now appears to be searching for the book as well. She explains to Trevor his past, the truth about the House of Love, and Dr. Ek's actual intent. She has sex with Trevor and tries to manipulate him into giving her the book.

Dr. Ek has another conversation with Trevor, and sends him back to the House of Love. Previously murdered characters are seen alive, just as they were the first time Trevor came to the house. While Trevor remembers his previous time here, the actors continue to pretend he has never been here before. The charade breaks down and actors begin to confess the ruse. Trevor suspects Faith will attempt to possess one of them in a final attempt to find the book. Observing all of this on the monitors, Dr. Coffee and Dr. Ek have a fight over Dr. Ek's methods. Dr. Ek drugs Dr. Coffee in a fit of rage. Dr. Ek eventually accepts the experiment's failure. He sends two orderlies to the house and begins to pack up and leave the sanitarium.

Thinking Faith has possessed Amy, he kills her. As the orderlies arrive at the house, Douglas (who is the one actually possessed by Faith) kills them and goes looking for Trevor. They run through the house, and Trevor eventually knocks Douglas down and makes his way to the attic. Douglas follows him down the stairs within the chest, and Trevor kills him. Trevor begins to see the situation playing out the way it did when he killed Faith in her own physical body. He attempts to make his way out of the Attic while another version of his consciousness is knocking on the chest. In the final scene, Trevor is seen pulling himself into the chest.

== Cast ==
- Andras Jones as Trevor Blackburn
- Seth Green as Douglas
- Jeffrey Combs as Dr. Ek
- Wendy Robie as Dr. Thalama
- Ted Raimi as Dr. Coffee
- Beth Bates as Faith
- Shannon Hart Cleary as Amy
- Alice Cooper as Samuel Leventhal
- Tim Heidecker as Orderly
- Jerry Hauck as Ronald
- Brenda James as Nurse
- Nancy Wolfe as Liz
- Scott Levy as Orderly

== Production ==
The Attic Expeditions was originally written to be the fourth film in the Witchcraft series. After reading the script, Kasten decided it had far more potential than he saw in the Witchcraft films. Together with the producers, they spent several years alternating between fundraising and filming.

The film is notable for being one of Seth Green's early performances in his transition from working as a child actor; Jeffrey Combs (who was attached from very early on) was responsible for bringing Seth and many of the other lead actors to the film.

Toward the end of production, a modern rock soundtrack was added at the request of the producers (and against Kasten's wishes) in an attempt to sell a soundtrack. While a soundtrack was never actually released, Blockbuster eventually picked the film up for distribution.

== Critical reception ==
Variety panned the film, calling it "an overly ambitious slice of Grand Guignol that is none too grand in conception or execution", and writing, "it could do small biz on the midnight circuit, although auds would have to be told whether laughing or cringing would be most appropriate." JoBlo.com was more positive, writing that "the film went a little too nutty when it came to messing with me and only repeat viewings will tell if the madness can actually make solid sense or if the screenwriter was hitting the "Bear Bong" too hard while writing the script, but having said that, get in a silly mood, kick the leeches out of your pad and enjoy the buzz."
