= The Wizard of Gore (2007 film) =

- DVD cover
- Directed by: Jeremy Kasten
- Written by: Zach Chassler
- Produced by: Jeremy Kasten; Glenn W. Gardner; Christopher Duddy; Daniel Gold; Dan Griffiths
- Starring: Kip Pardue; Bijou Phillips; Crispin Glover; Joshua Miller; Brad Dourif; Jeffrey Combs
- Cinematography: Christopher Duddy
- Edited by: Jeremy Kasten
- Music by: Steve Porcaro
- Production companies: Sick-O-Scope; Open Sky Entertainment
- Distributed by: Dimension Extreme; Genius Products
- Release dates: June 22, 2007 (LAIFF); August 19, 2008
- Running time: 94 minutes
- Country: United States
- Language: English

The Wizard of Gore is a 2007 splatter/noir horror film directed by Jeremy Kasten and starring Kip Pardue, Bijou Phillips, Crispin Glover, Joshua Miller, Brad Dourif, Jeffrey Combs, and the Suicide Girls. The film is a remake of the 1970 Herschell Gordon Lewis film of the same name.

== Plot ==
A magician named Montag the Magnificent puts on elaborate magic shows in a dilapidated post-punk Los Angeles in which he seemingly kills, in brutal torturous fashions, beautiful young women who nevertheless appear alive and unharmed at the end of the trick. Later, however, the victims are found dead of the same wounds that Montag gave them. Ed Bigelow, a young journalist with a trust fund and vintage style, tries to solve the mystery, but ends up discovering that he may be more involved than he first thought.

== Cast ==
- Kip Pardue as Edmund "Ed" Bigelow
- Bijou Phillips as Maggie
- Crispin Glover as Montag the Magnificent
- Joshua Miller as Jinky
- Brad Dourif as Dr. Chong
- Jeffrey Combs as The Geek
- Garz Chan as Annie
- Tim Chiou as Chinese Mickey
- Evan Seinfeld as Frank
- Suicide Girls as Dell, Cecelia, Cayenne, and Rexina
- Kenneth Moskow as Det. Packard

== Production ==
The Wizard of Gore was filmed in Los Angeles and director Kasten refers to it as "love letter" to Downtown L.A.

== Release ==
The Wizard of Gore was first released on June 22, 2007 at the LA Film Festival and subsequently premiered at the Landmark Theater on June 28. It was later released on DVD on August 19, 2008.

== Reception ==
Steve Barton of Dread Central rated the film 4 out of 5 and praised it saying "I applaud it for its overall insanity." Another review at Dread Central rated the film 2 1/2 out of 5 and while the reviewer found the film "highly atmospheric" it was ultimately "a little too long." Bloody Disgusting said "I’m partially (and sarcastically) impressed that someone could take The Wizard of Gore and make it worse."
