= The Abandoned (2015 film) =

- Theatrical release poster
- Directed by: Eytan Rockaway
- Written by: Ido Fluk
- Story by: Eytan Rockaway; Ido Fluk
- Produced by: Eytan Rockaway; Mike Landry; Carlos Velazquez
- Starring: Jason Patric; Louisa Krause; Mark Margolis
- Cinematography: Zack Galler
- Edited by: Giacomo Ambrosini
- Music by: Max Aruj
- Production company: C Plus Pictures
- Distributed by: IFC Films
- Release dates: June 14, 2015 (Los Angeles Film Festival); January 8, 2016
- Running time: 88 minutes
- Country: United States
- Language: English
- Budget: $850,000

The Abandoned (also known as The Confines, and Confined) is a 2015 American supernatural horror film directed by Eytan Rockaway, and written by Ido Fluk. It stars Jason Patric, Louisa Krause and Mark Margolis. The film premiered at the Los Angeles Film Festival on June 14, 2015, and was released in theaters and video on demand on January 8, 2016 by IFC Films. The film concerns a struggling young woman, who tries to reacquire her normal life by taking a job as a security guard at an abandoned apartment building. The Abandoned marked Rockaway's debut as director.

== Plot ==
Julia Streak (Louisa Krause) is a troubled, antipsychotic-dependent young woman who takes a job as a night guard at a grand but abandoned apartment complex so she can support her daughter, Clara. She is accepted by master keeper Dixon Boothe (Ezra Knight) and introduced to the only other security guard for the complex, the rude paraplegic Dennis Cooper (Jason Patric), who has been working at the complex since it opened. While patrolling, Julia hears whispers from Room 441, whose access is blocked by a locked door. Cooper denies that there is anything unusual behind the door, claiming that the owners left the room unfinished.

Sometime later, a homeless man, Jim (Mark Margolis) attempts to enter the complex. Cooper refuses him access, but Julia allows him shelter under the condition that he does not wander. Using a hammer from Jim's belongings, Julia breaks the lock and discovers that camera 441 is a corridor leading to a dormitory. Meanwhile, Jim wanders anyway and follows Julia into the dormitory. There, Julia encounters a number of deformed children. She calls for Cooper's aid, but the two end up losing track of Jim. Jim, now at the dormitory, is then killed by a blonde girl, who smashes his head with a faucet.

Julia searches through the internet and finds a video of the Wellville, a center for deformed and mentally-challenged children, which had been accused of abusing its patients. Julia connects the center with the dormitory but Cooper, having found out that she is dependent on anti-psychotics, handcuffs her while he agrees to go down to Room 441 alone. However, his wheelchair is forced to the dormitory, where he is haunted by the deformed children.

Following Cooper, Julia meets an apple-cheeked boy (Henry Kelemen), who gives her more details about Wellville: the children, four in total, attempted to escape, but they were caught and forced inside a room containing a reservoir of contaminated water. By the time that the Wellville's crimes were revealed, all but one had died. Thinking that the survivor struggling to get out of the reservoir is Clara (Morgan Waulters), Julia jumps inside, despite Cooper's warning. She is saved by Cooper from drowning at the cost of his life. Finding the door locked, Julia asks for mercy and is confronted by the children, including the face-deformed blonde girl. She convinces the girl to forgive her, after which the children allow her to leave.

It is revealed that all the events were happening inside Julia's mind. Julia is in fact the deformed girl, being the daughter of "Dennis Cooper", whom she gave a new identity in her dream. Dixon is the doctor assigned to her, Jim a sickly old man being treated next to her, while Clara is the name of her doll. The film ends with Julia flatlining after being on life support since she was a child, next to her grieving father.

== Cast ==
- Jason Patric as Dennis Cooper/Mr. Streak
- Louisa Krause as Julia Streak
- Mark Margolis as Jim
- Ezra Knight as Dixon Boothe
- Carlos Velazquez as Reporter
- Henry Kelemen as Apple-Cheeked Kid/Ethan
- Morgan Waulters as Clara/Young Julia Streak
- Lou Carbonneau as Cab Driver
- Jim Murtaugh as Dr. Thorndike
- Sophie Picone as Ghost Voice
- Janice Reed as Streak's Mother

== Release ==
The film had its first premiere at the Los Angeles Film Festival on June 13, 2015. It went on to play at the Chicago International Film Festival on October 16, and Screamfest on October 18, 2015. After the Los Angeles screening, the rights for distribution were acquired by IFC Films. The film opened in select theaters and on video on demand on January 8, 2016.

== Reception ==
The Abandoned received mixed reviews from film critics. Tirdad Derakhshani of The Philadelphia Inquirer wrote, "The Abandoned has a lot going for it. It eschews cheap scares, bloodletting, and gore. Instead, it works the audience with good, old-fashioned suspense. And it has heart." Frank Scheck of The Hollywood Reporter wrote, "The film is effective for long stretches, mainly due to Rockaway's superb use of his principal setting." Rob Hunter of Film School Rejects called it "A visually and emotionally-effective descent into darkness." Conversely, Michael Nordine of The Village Voice wrote, "Two second-act revelations alter its tired dynamic for the better, but those changes are undone by cheap scares and a climactic revelation that's more ho-hum than horrifying."

On Rotten Tomatoes, the film received positive reviews from 54% of surveyed critics and an average rating of 5.90/10, sampled from 13 reviews. Metacritic gives the film a score of 38 out of 100 based on eight reviews, signifying "generally unfavorable reviews".
