= The Specials (2000 film) =

2000 American comedy film directed by Craig Mazin

- DVD cover
- Directed by: Craig Mazin
- Written by: James Gunn
- Produced by: Mark A. Altman
- Starring: Thomas Haden Church; James Gunn; Rob Lowe; Jamie Kennedy; Judy Greer; Sean Gunn; Paget Brewster; Jordan Ladd; Jim Zulevic; Kelly Coffield
- Cinematography: Eliot Rockett
- Edited by: Jeremy Kasten
- Music by: Brian Langsford
- Production companies: Brillstein-Grey Entertainment; Mindfire Entertainment
- Distributed by: Fluid Entertainment; Regent Entertainment
- Release date: September 22, 2000
- Running time: 82 minutes
- Country: United States
- Language: English
- Box office: $13,276

The Specials is a 2000 American superhero comedy film directed by Craig Mazin and written by James Gunn. It stars an ensemble cast, featuring Gunn, Thomas Haden Church, Rob Lowe, Jamie Kennedy, Judy Greer, Sean Gunn, Paget Brewster, Jordan Ladd, Jim Zulevic and Kelly Coffield.

The film follows a group of ordinary superheroes on their day off. According to the film, the Specials are the sixth or seventh most popular group of superheroes in the world. Unlike most superhero films, The Specials has almost no action and few special effects; instead, it focuses on the day-to-day lives of the heroes.

== Plot ==
The Specials are the world's seventh-most popular superhero team. They have never achieved great popularity or prestige, because they are neither corporation-friendly nor stable enough to secure a merchandising deal. Without the corporate or private financial resources of more well-established teams, the Specials often battle underrated villains, assist in small disasters, and repel an occasional alien invasion — all of which are deemed too "low-priority" for other superhero teams.

The team welcomes Nightbird, the group's newest member, a teenage girl with "bird powers," and their leader, The Strobe, announces that they have struck a merchandising deal with Kosgrov Toys. The team has mixed reactions, believing that while this could elevate their status, it may also require sacrificing their independent, anti-establishment image. The Weevil, the team's most popular member, begins making secret negotiations to leave the team for one with better financing.

The Specials attend a dinner in their honor thrown by Kosgrov Toys, introducing their line of action figures. However, Kosgrov did little research on the Specials and low-balled their production, resulting in several figures have glaring inaccuracies and cheap accessories. Several figures use recycled parts from other toy lines, and the team is outraged at Kosgrov's indifference about the products. The Strobe catches his wife, Ms. Indestructible, cheating on him with the Weevil, and publicly disbands the group.

During their disbandment, The Strobe considers civilian life, while Ms. Indestructible regrets her affair. The Strobe's brother, Minute Man, begins a relationship with Deadly Girl when they find common loyalty to the team. The Weevil finalizes his transfer to another superhero team, while the rest of the Specials indulge in a night of drinking and dancing.

The Strobe and Ms. Indestructible reconcile, and the Strobe renews his passion for justice instead of image. Together, they learn that The Weevil's transfer has backfired, as reporters focus more on his controversial status than his ability to apprehend villains, and his ego is crushed by being the least popular member of his new team. The Strobe reunites The Specials and they commit to staying together, pledging that it may not bring popularity or glory, but they've become the champions of society's underdogs. The team 'powers up' and they leave to fight giant ants attacking The Pentagon.

== Cast ==
- Thomas Haden Church as Ted Tilderbrook / The Strobe: The leader of the group. He founded the Specials along with his brother Minute Man, the Weevil, Ms. Indestructible, and Stretchie Boy. He has the ability to shoot laser beams out of his arms and possesses a big ego.
- Paget Brewster as Emily Tilderbrook / Ms. Indestructible: The Strobe's wife and secretary. She acts as a sort of office manager or accountant for the group. She has indestructible skin ("that can withstand a nuclear blast") and cannot be injured anywhere but her eyes. She has an affair with The Weevil.
- James Gunn as Tim Tilderbrook / Minute Man: The Strobe's brother. He has the ability to shrink himself to a small size (about 5 inches on average). He is irritated by people constantly mispronouncing his name and mistaking him for a minuteman. He is also self-conscious about his uniform making him look gay.
- Rob Lowe as Tony / The Weevil: The most popular member of the group, he inherited his codename and powers from his father. He has enhanced abilities proportionate to that of an insect, though only "weevil agility" is specifically named. He is having an affair with Ms. Indestructible. He also longs to leave The Specials and join the substantially more popular Crusaders.
- Kelly Coffield as Nancy / Power Chick: An outgoing lesbian with the ability to change her body into any material with which she comes in contact. She considers herself to be Alien Orphan's guardian.
- Sean Gunn as Doug / Alien Orphan: An alien who crash-landed on Earth. He can shape-shift, but often has trouble communicating. He is cared for by Power Chick.
- Judy Greer as Deadly Girl: A young woman who has the ability to enter the "world of the dead" and travel through it, reappearing anywhere she chooses. She can also summon demons to do her bidding, something she says "makes [one] feel good about [oneself]".
- Jim Zulevic as Seymour / Mr. Smart: A man claiming to be the smartest on Earth. He is an inventor of gadgets such as a smile machine and a device that amplifies his sense of smell 3,000 times. The Weevil refers to Mr. Smart as a "washout" who contributes little to the team.
- Jordan Ladd as Shelly / Nightbird: The team's newest member, a teen with very sensitive hearing, an affinity with birds, and the ability to lay eggs, each of which contain a different weapon.
- Jamie Kennedy as Amok: A former super-villain with blue skin and the ability to manipulate antimatter. He is extremely vulgar, preoccupied with sex, and, at one time, jailed after capture by rival superhero group The Crusaders.
- John Doe, Brian Gunn, Lauren Cohn, Chuti Tiu, Abdul Salaam El Razzac, Tom Dorfmeister, Johann Stauf and Samantha Cannon as Eight: Believed to be the result of a CIA experiment, this hero simultaneously operates eight separate human bodies; allowing him to be in several places at once and receive mixed sensory input. The bodies also span multiple genders and ethnicities. Eight, by his own admission, is passive until required to act.
- Barry Del Sherman as Jerry / Zip Boy: Former group member who quit to become an entrepreneur. His business is finding "normal" job placements for superheroes. As the name might imply, he possesses super-speed - he can run from Yemen to Bel-Air in 28 minutes.
- Mike Schwartz as U.S. Bill: Superhero of limited intelligence but super-human strength. He is extremely obsessed with keeping his identity secret, and lives at home with his mother.
- Taryn Manning as Autograph Hound
- Jenna Fischer as College Girl
- Melissa Joan Hart as Sunlight Grrrll
- Michael Weatherly as Verdict
- Judith Drake as Verdict's Secretary

== Production ==
James Gunn wrote the movie in a span of two to three weeks. He gave the script to his brother Sean who passed it to Jamie Kennedy who shared it with his manager, Peter Safran, who then signed Gunn as a client.

Producer Mark A. Altman described the film as being in the spirit of Clerks or This Is Spinal Tap and looking at the lives of superheroes in a real world setting dealing with petty feuds and feelings of disillusionment in between fighting crime or supervillains.

The film was released on Blu-Ray for its 20th anniversary in 2020.

== Critical reception ==
The review aggregator Rotten Tomatoes reported a 50% approval rating with an average rating of 5.1/10, based on 14 reviews. The website's consensus reads, "Clever, funny, and exciting." Metacritic gave the film a weighted average score of 38 out of 100, based on 8 critics, indicating "generally unfavorable reviews".

Horrornews.net stated: "The film is simply dumb fun or has fun being dumb. Not every gag is funny, however the idea and execution is really what makes it a treat."
