= Motor Home Massacre =

- Directed by: Allen Wilbanks
- Written by: Allen Wilbanks
- Starring: Shan Holleman; Nelson Bonilla; Tanya Fraser; Justin Geer
- Cinematography: Allen Wilbanks
- Edited by: Rett Thompson; Allen Wilbanks
- Production company: iStream LLC
- Distributed by: Lionsgate Films
- Release date: August 2, 2005
- Country: United States
- Language: English

Motor Home Massacre is a horror film written and directed by Allen Wilbanks that was released on August 2, 2005, and starring Shan Holleman, Nelson Bonilla, Tanya Fraser and Justin Geer. It was produced by iStream LLC and distributed by Lionsgate.

== Plot ==
A lighthearted vacation in a vintage RV turns into a deadly roller-coaster ride for seven young friends in this gorefest tinged with touches of camp. A psychopath armed with night vision goggles and a machete stalks his prey, and there seems to be no escaping his brutal intentions.

== Cast ==
- Shan Holleman as Sabrina
- Nelson Bonilla as Roger
- Justin Geer as Benji
- Tanya Fraser as Nicole
- Breanne Ashley as Brooke
- Greg Corbett as Nick
- Lane Morlotte as Jebediah (store clerk)

== Reception ==
The Horror Review said, "in a nutshell, if your into movies that are so bad that their good, then you’ll probably get a kick out of Motor Home Massacre." Black Horror Movies said, "If it does nothing else, Motor Home Massacre realizes that if you’re gonna make a crappy horror movie, you can’t take yourself too seriously."
