= The Thirst (film) =

- Directed by: Jeremy Kasten
- Written by: Ben Lustig; Liz Maccie; Wayne Mahon; Mark A. Altman; Jeremy Kasten
- Produced by: Mark A. Altman; Mark Gottwald
- Starring: Matt Keeslar; Clare Kramer; Jeremy Sisto; Serena Scott Thomas; Neil Jackson; Adam Baldwin; Charlotte Ayanna; Erik Palladino; Ellie Cornell; Tom Lenk
- Cinematography: Raymond Stella
- Edited by: Kevin Greutert; Jeremy Kasten
- Music by: Joe Kraemer
- Distributed by: Anchor Bay Entertainment
- Release date: May 15, 2007
- Running time: 88 minutes
- Country: United States
- Language: English

The Thirst is a 2007 American horror film directed by Jeremy Kasten.

== Plot ==
Recovering drug addicts Maxx (Matt Keeslar) and Lisa (Clare Kramer) are persuaded by vampire clan leader Darius (Jeremy Sisto) to give up their humanity and join him as vampires. They do so, but then give up the vampire's blood addiction – the Thirst. After enduring the withdrawal symptoms, the couple turns against the band of vampires who made them.

== Cast ==
- Matt Keeslar as Maxx
- Clare Kramer as Lisa
- Jeremy Sisto as Darius
- Serena Scott Thomas as Mariel
- Neil Jackson as Duke of Earl
- Adam Baldwin as Lenny
- Kylah Kim as Sister #1
- Ave Rose Rodil as Sister #2
- Alicia Morton as Sara
- Charlotte Ayanna as Macey
- Erik Palladino as Jason
- Blythe Metz as Sasha
- Michael Mantell as Doctor
- Dawn Weld as Kiki
- Ellie Cornell as Nurse Linda
- Tom Lenk as Kronos

== See also ==
- Vampire film
