= Eytan Rockaway =

American film director

- Education: New York University
- Occupations: Film director, producer, writer, entrepreneur

Eytan Rockaway is an American film director, writer and producer. After graduating of NYU's Tisch School of the Arts, Rockaway co-founded A Matter of Substance: a cross platform media/entertainment entity spanning the fields of Music, Film and Television. In '07 the company's focus shifted to creating a new high definition channel AMOS Television. Rockaway made his directorial debut with The Abandoned, which was an official selection of the Los Angeles Film Festival and the Chicago International Film Festival. IFC Films released The Abandoned in theaters January 2016. His second feature Lansky starring Harvey Keitel was released June 2021.

== Awards and recognition ==
- 2015 Chicago International Film Festival - Nominated, " The Abandoned" (aka The Confines)
- 2015 Los Angeles Film Festival - Nominated, "The Abandoned" (aka The Confines)
- 2015 Screamfest - Nominated, "The Abandoned" (aka The Confines)
- 2012 La Jolla Fashion Film Festival - Award Nominee, " Dreams of the Heartbroken"
- 2011 Milano Film Festival - Award Nominee, "My First Time"
