= Insecticidal (film) =

- Release poster
- Directed by: Jeffery Scott Lando
- Written by: Jeff O'Brien
- Produced by: Ed Brando; Sam Eigen
- Starring: Meghan Heffern; Rhonda Dent; Travis Watters; Shawn Bachynski
- Cinematography: Pieter Stathis
- Edited by: Wade Taves
- Music by: Christopher Nickel
- Production companies: Riptide Entertainment; Incisor Productions; Way Below the Line Productions
- Distributed by: Shoreline Entertainment
- Release date: 28 April 2005 (Sci-Fi-London)
- Running time: 81 minutes
- Country: Canada
- Language: English

Insecticidal is a 2005 Canadian comedy horror film directed by Jeffery Scott Lando. In the film, a college student performs experiments on insects until a housemate tries to kill them. The insects grow to huge sizes and turn the sorority house into a nest, trying to kill the residents.

== Cast ==
In order of appearance:

- Meghan Heffern - Cami
- Rhonda Dent - Josi
- Samantha McLeod - Sophi
- Shawn Bachynski - Martin
- Vicky Huang - Fumi
- Travis Watters - Mitch
- Anna Amoroso - Jenni
- Natalia Tudge - Twisti (as Natalia Walker)
- Ryan Zwick - Dick
- Nelson Carter Leis - Kyle
- Anna Farrant - Belli
- Chris Guy - Cherri
- Alan Steele - Pizza Boy
- Sean Whale - Sluggo
- Simon Sippola - Security Guard (voice)

== Release ==
Insecticidal was released on DVD by Hart Sharp Video on June 20, 2006. Hart Video later re-released the film as a part of a 4-disk Gore Pack Box Set.

== Reception ==
Felix Vasquez Jr. of Cinema Crazed gave Insecticidal a mostly positive review, commending the film's strong performances and embracing its exploitation film roots, writing, "Jeffery Lando’s monster mash is firmly entrenched in the schlock arena. It’s a guiltless and shameless piece of exploitation that is so based around the sexy female cast, even the bugs want to strip them naked and mount them." Popcorn Pictures awarded the film a score of 6/10, writing, "A guilty pleasure if there was one, Insecticidal is the silly tonic fans need to down after they’ve sat through the never-ending dreck that the Sci-Fi Channel has been churning out lately. Now who wants to fund me a couple of grand to make Babes Versus Bugs?"
