= Erica Roby =

American actress

- Born: U.S.
- Occupations: Film actress, producer
- Years active: 2006–2007 (actress); 2013–present (producer)

Erica Roby is an American producer, editor and former actress, known for her work with the film studio The Asylum.

== Actress ==
Much of Roby's work consists of low budget horror films, again products of The Asylum. Her lead-roles include Exorcism: The Possession of Gail Bowers (2006) and the science-fiction film Invasion of the Pod People (2007).

== Crewmember ==
Roby has since retired from acting, and has appeared in production credits for Celebrity Rehab with Dr. Drew (story editor), Denise Richards: It's Complicated (story editor) and the thirteenth season of The Amazing Race (associate producer)

== Filmography ==
- 2006 Exorcism: The Possession of Gail Bowers as Gail Bowers
- 2006 Hillside Cannibals as Rhian
- 2006 Bram Stoker's Dracula's Curse as Christina Lockheart
- 2006 The Apocalypse as Laura
- 2006 The 9/11 Commission Report as Melinda
- 2006 Halloween Night as Angela
- 2007 The Hitchhiker as Lindsey
- 2007 Invasion of the Pod People as Melissa
