= Dead Men Walking (film) =

- DVD cover
- Directed by: Peter Mervis
- Written by: Mike Watt
- Produced by: David Michael Latt; David Rimawi; Paul Bales
- Starring: Bay Bruner; Griff Furst; Chriss Anglin; Bobby James; Brandon Stacy
- Cinematography: Mark Atkins
- Edited by: Peter Mervis
- Music by: Mel Lewis
- Distributed by: Asylum Home Entertainment
- Release date: October 25, 2005
- Running time: 82 minutes
- Country: United States
- Language: English
- Budget: $500,000

Dead Men Walking is an independent 2005 zombie film directed by Peter Mervis and written by Mike Watt. It features a zombie outbreak at a maximum security prison. The film has also been shown on Syfy in the United States.

== Plot ==
Travis Dee is slaying many zombies, but blood splashes on Travis' face, infecting him. Travis tries to convince the press and police that they were infected with an experimental bio-toxin, and now he is sick from it. The Centers for Disease Control and Prevention (CDC) don't know if he is right or wrong, so he is sentenced to Haywood Maximum Security Prison.

A BBC worker, Samantha Beckett, is sent to the prison to give more information on Travis. Travis and the new inmates arrive at the facility and are put in a line where they are evaluated by corrections officer, Lieutenant Sweeney, telling them that he is "top of the food chain" in the prison. After noticing Travis coughing heavily and pale, he is sent to the infirmary. Another new arrival, Johnny, is sent to Warden Mahler's office. Mahler tells him not to do anything stupid or make guards angry. His story is the same that Travis had been telling others. The bitten guard dies and Mahler, Sweeney, Dr. Goring, Samantha and Johnny try to determine if the virus is real. Samantha examines Travis’ body and sees that the blood indicates he died at least hours ago, though Sweeney shot him just minutes ago.

Sweeney, Jenkins and Mahler devise a plan to move through the building and gather all the uninfected staff to barricade themselves in the staffroom on the other end of the facility while the guards venture out to kill all infected. He also plans to leave all the uninfected inmates to die, much to Johnny’s dismay. Johnny is sent back to the cell but on the way he knocks out a guard and takes his gun to run for the outside.

Sweeney, Jenkins, Mahler and Keith head to the officers’ office where Sweeney calls for the National Guard to secure the prison and blockade the entire facility. He stays with his decision to leave the inmates for dead but does tell all of them to stay in their cells.

Sweeney, Mahler, Keith, Jenkins and many other guards make it to the cell blocks to see that all the inmate and staff left have been infected and zombified. As everyone prepares for the zombies to break out of the cells, Sweeney tells Jenkins that when he turns to shoot him. Mahler, realizing Sweeney is infected, leaves the group to protect his son. The zombies on that side start to follow the two as they slip in zombie blood, trying to reach Mahler’s office. The zombies break out of the cell blocks and run for the guards. They open fire, killing many of them left and right. Seeing that many more are coming, they split up and run inside cells and lock the gates, separating them and keeping firing distance. Samantha meets up with Johnny and they decide to escape together.

After most guards are killed in cells, Jenkins and another guard escape the cell while Sweeney and another stay to fight. Sweeney sees the zombified Mahler and shoots him. After going completely crazy from the disease, Sweeney shoots everywhere, accidentally hitting his partner guard. Sweeney leaves through a backdoor and lies down there while the zombies break through and kill the shot guard.

Samantha and Johnny move on. He is bitten and stays behind to give her a chance to leave. She flees and kills Sweeney, now a zombie. In the yard, Jenkins is bitten and she puts him out of his misery. A sniper mistakes Samantha for a zombie and kills her.

== Cast ==
- Bay Bruner as Samantha Beckett
- Griff Furst as Johnny
- Chriss Anglin as Sweeney
- Bobby James as Warden Mahler
- Brandon Stacy as Travis
- James Ferris as Jenkins
- Roman Vigdorov as Keith Mahler

== Production ==
The film was filmed in the decommissioned Lincoln Heights Jail in Los Angeles, California, USA.

== Reception ==
Dread Central said, "If all you want, need, or expect out of a zombie movie is to see people in zombie make-up kill, bite, and disembowel people then Dead Men Walking will give you your fix."

== See also ==
- Exorcism: The Possession of Gail Bowers - Another film by The Asylum, also featuring the (fictitious) Blackthorn Industries seen in this film.
