= Madea's Witness Protection =

- Theatrical release poster
- Directed by: Tyler Perry
- Written by: Tyler Perry
- Based on: Characters by Tyler Perry
- Produced by: Tyler Perry; Ozzie Areu; Paul Hall
- Starring: Tyler Perry; Eugene Levy; Denise Richards; Doris Roberts; Romeo Miller; Tom Arnold; John Amos; Marla Gibbs
- Cinematography: Alexander Gruszynski
- Edited by: Maysie Hoy
- Music by: Aaron Zigman
- Production companies: Tyler Perry Studios; 34th Street Films
- Distributed by: Lionsgate
- Release date: June 29, 2012
- Running time: 114 minutes
- Country: United States
- Language: English
- Budget: $20 million
- Box office: $66.9 million

Madea's Witness Protection is a 2012 American comedy film co-produced, written and directed by Tyler Perry, who stars with Eugene Levy, Denise Richards, Doris Roberts, Romeo Miller, Tom Arnold, John Amos, and Marla Gibbs. It is the fourteenth film by Perry and the seventh installment in the Madea film series. It is the fourth Perry film not to be adapted from a play, alongside The Family That Preys, Daddy's Little Girls, and Good Deeds, as well as the first Madea film not to be adapted from a play. It tells the story about Madea being a host to a family that the FBI has entered into the witness protection program due to the fact that the patriarch has been the CFO of a company that a crime family was using to further their Ponzi schemes.

Filmed in Atlanta from mid-to-late January to March 2012, Madea's Witness Protection was released through Lionsgate on June 29, 2012. With total box office gross of about $67 million, it is one of Tyler Perry's three most successful movies, along with Boo! A Madea Halloween and Madea Goes to Jail.

== Plot ==
Good-natured but clueless, nerdy George Needleman (Eugene Levy) is the CFO of Lockwise Industries in New York City. He lives in nearby Connecticut with his second wife Kate (Denise Richards), mother Barbara (Doris Roberts), troubled teenage daughter from an earlier marriage Cindy (Danielle Campbell), and pre-teen son Howie (Devan Leos). One day, George arrives at work, only to discover a shocking scene: his co-workers frantically shredding documents. His boss, Walter (Tom Arnold), reveals that the entire company is a Ponzi scheme run by the Malone crime family. Walter falsely pins the blame on George for orchestrating the scam before making his escape.

In Atlanta, Brian Simmons (Tyler Perry) and his boss Lucas (Jeff Joslin) have been following the Malones' illegal activities. With Walter having flown to Europe in the hopes of fighting extradition, they determine that their best bet is to convince George to testify against the Malones. The FBI 'arrests' George, placing him and his dysfunctional family into a witness protection program. Brian then relocates the Needlemans to a secure location: Madea and Joe's (Perry) house in Georgia.

Meanwhile, Jake Nelson (Romeo Miller) – whose elderly, failing father (John Amos) is a church pastor who has put him in charge of the church's mortgage fund – stages a robbery against Madea which is unsuccessful. Jake, who has a criminal past but whose father trusts that he has turned over a new leaf, is trying to recover church funds that he has invested in Lockwise Industries without his father's knowledge or consent only to lose the entire investment in the Ponzi scheme.

The Needlemans' first meeting with Madea and Joe is awkward, and bodes poorly for how everyone will get along as Madea coves up their appearance at her house to her neighbor Hattie (Marla Gibbs). Over time, Madea helps Kate and Cindy relate better to each other and to other family members, while Joe and Kate help George become more confident, more in touch with his surroundings and people around him, and more effective in channeling his emotions. Barbara displays dual sensibilities about "colored people". On one hand, she mistakes Madea for a domestic named Sadie, treats "Sadie" imperiously, and threatens to get her fired. On the other hand, she recognizes Joe as a man she slept with years ago (and George's biological father), and relates to him seductively. She also enjoys Negro spirituals and repeatedly asks to be taken to the African American church down the street from Madea's house.

Pastor Nelson's sermon inspires George to recognize a pattern in his company's records that explains where 10% of the stolen funds have been stashed. After church, watching Whoopi Goldberg's Oda Mae Brown character in Ghost inspires George to involve Madea in a plan to re-divert funds from the "stashed" accounts back to the 12 charities whose investments were stolen in the Ponzi scheme.

The plan requires George (who disguises himself as a Frenchman to avoid detection by the Malone mob), Jake, and Madea (who assumes the identity of an upscale woman named "Precious Jackson") to travel to New York City, and for "Precious" to meet with bank manager Jack Goldenberg (Frank Brennan) to transfer funds from the laundered accounts to the 12 legitimate charities. When George and Jake begin to share their plan with Brian, he cuts them off and advises them it's illegal.

When the three of them are in New York, Madea successfully accomplishes her mission. Although she improvises both an expansion of her assumed identity (by pretending to be the oldest Jackson sister) and also has some of the money sent to her real bank account which she passes off as a 13th charity.

After the caper, Brian informs George that his cooperation with the authorities and his successful efforts to return the "13" charities' funds have given Brian leverage to dismiss the charges against George as well as Walter and the rest of George's former bosses being pressured to testify against the Malone crime family.

Kate points out to George that the situation has strengthened their relationship and their family, and that it is a blessing in disguise. Upon leaving Madea's house, Cindy and Howie ask if they can come back to visit. Both Madea and Joe immediately decline, though Madea does so in a sweet demeanor.

Before returning to New York, the Needlemans visit Pastor Nelson's church one last time. Pastor Nelson and Jake burn the mortgage papers and the entire congregation celebrates the mortgage's being paid off and the Needlemans enjoy the Negro spirituals. Madea also enjoys the spiritual music from her front porch while celebrating her new wealth.

== Cast ==
- Tyler Perry as Mabel "Madea" Simmons, a tough old lady.
  - Brian Simmons, the nephew of Madea who works as a lawyer.
  - Joe Simmons, the brother of Madea and the father of Brian.
- Eugene Levy as George Needleman, the CFO of Lockwise Industries whose family is entered into the witness protection program by the FBI.
- Denise Richards as Kate Needleman, George's second wife, Cindy's stepmother and Howie's mother.
- Doris Roberts as Barbara Needleman, the mother of George.
- Romeo Miller as Jake Nelson, a young man who loses the church's money to Lockwise Industries.
- Tom Arnold as Walter Burns, the COO of Lockwise Industries and George's boss.
- John Amos as Pastor Nelson, a pastor who is the father of Jake.
- Marla Gibbs as Hattie, Madea's neighbor.
- Danielle Campbell as Cindy Needleman, the troubled youth daughter, and older child of George Needleman from a previous relationship and Howie's half-sister.
- Devan Leos as Howie Needleman, the son of George and Kate Needleman, George's youngest child, and Cindy's half-brother.
- Jeff Joslin as Lucas, Brian Simmons' boss who helps in investigating the activities of the Malone crime family.
- Frank Brennan as Jack Goldenberg, a bank manager in New York.
- Charlie Sheen as himself (uncredited cameo), he is seen in one of the outtakes during the credits where Madea encounters him offset.

== Reception ==
=== Critical response ===
The film received generally negative reviews. Rotten Tomatoes gives the film a score of 19% based on 37 reviews, with an average rating of 4.20/10. On Metacritic, the film has a score of 42 out of 100 based on reviews from 15 critics, indicating "mixed or average reviews". Audiences polled by CinemaScore gave the film an A− grade.

Madea's Witness Protection received five Golden Raspberry Award nominations including Worst Actress (Tyler Perry as Madea), Worst Director, Worst Screen Couple (Perry and his drag getup), Worst Screen Ensemble and Worst Prequel, Remake, Rip-off or Sequel.

=== Box office ===
The film opened with $25,390,575 in its opening weekend, ranking #4 behind Ted, Magic Mike, and Brave. As of August 2019 the film has grossed total of $66,899,242 worldwide, surpassing its $20 million budget, making it a financial success despite poor reviews.

== Home media ==
Madea's Witness Protection was released on DVD and Blu-Ray on October 23, 2012.
