= Hillside Cannibals =

- DVD cover
- Directed by: Leigh Scott
- Written by: Steve Bevilacqua
- Produced by: David Michael Latt; David Rimawi; Paul Bales
- Starring: Heather Conforto; Tom Nagel; Katayoun Dara; Vaz Andreas; Frank Pacheco; Erica Roby
- Cinematography: Lincoln Lewis
- Edited by: Peter Mervis
- Music by: Mel Lewis
- Distributed by: The Asylum
- Release date: March 28, 2006
- Running time: 86 minutes
- Country: United States
- Language: English
- Budget: $600,000

Hillside Cannibals is a 2006 American horror film directed by Leigh Scott and produced by The Asylum. The film is a mockbuster of the film The Hills Have Eyes, another film released around the same month, but its plot also incorporates elements from other films, including Cannibal Holocaust, The Texas Chainsaw Massacre and House of 1000 Corpses.

== Plot ==
In the year 1606, Sawney Bean, a ruthless psychopath, earned a notoriety as the world's most brutal serial killer, predating Jack the Ripper and Bloody Bill by several hundred years. In life, Sawney was a cannibal, who captured his victims and literally butchered them, feasting on their corpses afterwards.

His practices are continued in the modern day by his in-bred descendants, who dwell in vast caves in the Mojave Desert and feed on the flesh of passers-by, as a group of teenagers soon discover whilst exploring the steep cliff-face where Sawney's descendants dwell in search of flesh.

== Cast ==
- Heather Conforto as Linda
- Tom Nagel as Bill
- Katayoun Dara as Tonya
- Vaz Andreas as Callum
- Frank Pacheco as Magnus
- Erica Roby as Rhiana
- Ella Holden as Amber
- Justin Jones as Mark
- Marie Westbrook as Tog
- Thomas Downey as Towart / Mr. Pratt
- Crystal Napoles as Tearlach
- Chriss Anglin as Ted
- Louis Graham as Sheriff Lachlan
- Leigh Scott as Sawney Bean / David
- Brian J. Garland as Balloch

== Reception ==
Dread Central panned Hillside Cannibal, commenting that they found the film so unenjoyable that getting "stupid drunk" through a proposed drinking game "is probably the best way to get through this ordeal." HorrorTalk also heavily criticized the movie, as they felt that the film had several flaws that were due to lazy film making and that the script was "just terrible".

== See also ==
- Death Valley: The Revenge of Bloody Bill - Another horror film by The Asylum based on a real-life killer, in this case, William "Bloody Bill" Anderson.
