= Satanic (2006 film) =

- Directed by: Dan Golden
- Written by: Dan Golden; Ben Powell
- Produced by: Mark Burman; Barry Barnholtz
- Starring: Annie Sorell; Jeffrey Combs; Angus Scrimm
- Cinematography: Robert Hayes; Ben Kufrin
- Edited by: Christopher Roth
- Music by: Mikael Jacobson
- Distributed by: Lionsgate Entertainment (USA); American Cinema International
- Release date: 2006
- Running time: 88 minutes
- Country: United States
- Language: English
- Budget: $120,000 (estimated)

Satanic is a 2006 American horror film directed by Dan Golden and starring Annie Sorell, Jeffrey Combs, Angus Scrimm and James Russo.

== Plot ==
The powers of darkness converge to claim the soul of a young girl who may have made a deal with the devil, who has come to collect. As a result of a devastating car accident that claims the life of her father, Michelle wakes up in a hospital in a state of amnesia—and her face is completely destroyed from the crash. With no recollection of the supernatural events before the accident that took her father, she has to figure out why people around her are mysteriously dying; she must try to remember if she has any chance of saving herself and her loved ones from this dark force. After her doctor perfectly reconstructs her face using family pictures as a guide, Michelle is discharged from the hospital and sent to a home that lodges young offenders, as she was deemed a delinquent before the car crash. On the very day she leaves the hospital, the janitor is murdered.

Michelle is troubled by a series of hellish nightmares and the Mephistophelean force that is killing the people in her life who seem to be committing suicide. A police detective named Joyner suspects that she is somehow responsible for the murders. Michelle desperately attempts to solve the mystery of her malevolent past in order to save herself and those around her before it is too late. Despite her gallant efforts, the legions of the damned eventually take her away.

== Cast ==
- Annie Sorell as Michelle
- Jeffrey Combs as Detective Joyner
- Angus Scrimm as Dr. Barbary
- James Russo as Eddie
- Brett Erickson as Larry
- Eliza Swenson as Dalia
- Brian Burnett as Dutch
- Diane Goldner as Jackie
- Rick Dean as Bisson
- Lauren Emmel as Kayla
- George Tovar as the Father
- Michael Gaglio as Cliff
- Matteo Indelicato as Mike
- Priscilla Jones as the Father's girlfriend
