= Dorothy and the Witches of Oz =

- Directed by: Leigh Scott
- Screenplay by: Leigh Scott
- Story by: Leigh Scott; Eliza Swenson; Chris Campbell
- Produced by: Leigh Scott; Eliza Swenson; Chris Campbell
- Starring: Paulie Rojas; Billy Boyd; Eliza Swenson; Mia Sara; Lance Henriksen; Christopher Lloyd
- Cinematography: Leigh Scott
- Edited by: Nick Everhart; Leigh Scott; Eliza Swenson
- Music by: Eliza Swenson
- Production company: Palace/Imaginarium
- Distributed by: IFI Studios (theatrical)
- Release date: February 17, 2012
- Running time: 101 minutes
- Country: United States
- Language: English

Dorothy and the Witches of Oz is a 2012 film directed by Leigh Scott, based on the early 20th century novels The Wonderful Wizard of Oz, Ozma of Oz, The Road to Oz and The Magic of Oz by L. Frank Baum. The film stars Paulie Rojas, Billy Boyd, Eliza Swenson, Mia Sara, Lance Henriksen, Jeffery Combs, and Christopher Lloyd. A longer version of the film was originally released as a TV miniseries in 2011 called The Witches of Oz, distributed by MarVista Entertainment. The miniseries was over an hour longer and had earlier versions of the special effects. The miniseries was originally released in 2011 in Europe, though its United Kingdom premiere was not until July 5, 2012 on the Sci-Fi Channel.

Development of the miniseries/film began while director Leigh Scott was making direct-to-video films for The Asylum. Production began in December 2009 and filming took place throughout Connecticut and New York City.

== Plot ==
An adult Dorothy Gale is now a successful children's book author and has moved from Kansas to present day New York City. Dorothy quickly learns that her popular books are based on repressed childhood memories, and that the wonders of Oz are real. When the Wicked Witch of the West shows up in Times Square, Dorothy must find the inner courage to stop her.

== Cast ==
- Paulie Rojas as Dorothy Gale, a successful children's book author from Kansas.
  - Marissa Smoker portrays a younger Dorothy Gale
- Eliza Swenson as Billie Westbrook, a book publisher's agent who is the Earth-based form of the Wicked Witch of the West.
- Billy Boyd as Nick Chopper, Dorothy's boyfriend. His name is a reference to the true name of the Tin Woodsman in the original books, though he is a different character in the film.
- Christopher Lloyd as the Wizard of Oz, the ruler of the Emerald City.
- Ari Zagaris as Allen Denslow, the illustrator of Dorothy's books who is the Earth-based form of the Scarecrow.
- Ross Edgar as Rick, a man who only appears in the original version of the film.
  - Jordan Turnage as Tin Man, the true form of Rick.
- Barry Ratcliffe as Bryan Jennings, Dorothy's lawyer who is the Earth-based form of the Cowardly Lion. According to a column written by Henry Littlefield in 1964, Baum modeled the Lion on lawyer William Jennings Bryan.
- Mia Sara as Princess Langwidere, a witch who is an ally of the Wicked Witch of the West and has many heads that she changes.
  - Sasha Jackson as Ilsa Lang, a popular Hollywood actress who is one of the thirty-one different heads of Princess Langwidere.
  - Jessica Sonneborn as Ev Locast, one of Princess Langwidere's thirty-one different heads.
  - Elizabeth Masucci as Jennifer Mombi, a New York citizen whose head is claimed by Princess Langwidere. Her surname is a reference to Mombi, the Wicked Witch of the North who first appeared in The Marvelous Land of Oz. Langwidere and Mombi were previously conflated into "Princess Mombi" in Return to Oz (1985).
- Sean Astin as Frack Muckadoo, a servant of Princess Langwidere.
- Ethan Embry as Frick Muckadoo, a servant of Princess Langwidere. Frick and Frack are named for a comical ice skating duo of the 20th century. The name Muckadoo appears nowhere in Baum's Oz books.
- Lance Henriksen as Henry Gale, Dorothy's old-fashioned uncle who lives in rural Kansas.
- Jeffrey Combs as Frank, a Kansas farmer who is the author of the original Oz books and Dorothy's real father. His full name is L. Frank Baum, although he is not meant to be a biographical depiction of the author.
- Noel Thurman as Glinda, the Good Witch of the South and ruler of the Quadling Country.
- Brionne Davis as Simon, Ilsa's ill-tempered mysterious assistant who is an unknown creature that works for Princess Langwidere.
- Al Snow as the Nome King, a cruel king of the Nomes who is set on revenge on the Tin Man.
- Liz Douglas as Aunt Em, Henry's wife.
- Brooke Taylor as Locasta, the Good Witch of the North and younger sister to Glinda.
- Sarah Lieving as the Wicked Witch of the East, the sister of the Wicked Witch of the West.
- Chanel Ryan as Pinney Pinney
- Rajah as Toto, Dorothy's dog and loyal companion.
- Thea Trinidad as Astoria

== Release ==
Dorothy and the Witches of Oz was released theatrically in the United States on February 17, 2012. The film opened in select AMC Theatres, Harkins Theatres, Rave Motion Pictures, and Marcus Theatres venues in Arizona, Kentucky, Kansas, Wisconsin, Nebraska, Iowa and Illinois. The film was then shown at film festivals and exclusive events in New York, Kentucky, California, Virginia, Missouri, Pennsylvania, and North Carolina throughout the course of the year.

The original version of the film, in the form of the miniseries The Witches of Oz, was released on home video in France on November 9, 2011, in Germany on December 8, 2011, and in the United States on April 10, 2012.

=== Reception ===
Despite an overall negative response from critics and audiences to the original miniseries version, the later film version Dorothy and the Witches of Oz received better, but still mixed, reviews during its theatrical run. Bob Fischbach of the Omaha World-Herald praised the film for its contemporary twist on the story, but stated that it was "cheesy, but fun for family." Patrick Luce of Monsters & Critics gave the film a positive review, and stated that "hopefully this won't be the only trip to Oz we'll get to take".

== Soundtrack ==
Dorothy and the Witches of Oz

Soundtrack album by Eliza Swenson
- Released: 2012
- Genre: Classical
- Label: Imaginarium
- Producer: Eliza Swenson

The soundtrack to the film, composed by Eliza Swenson, was released on iTunes, and then on a soundtrack CD in February 2012.

=== Track listing ===
1. "From the Beginning"
2. "Billie Westbrook"
3. "A Place Called Oz"
4. "The Changing Word"
5. "Friend and Foe"
6. "This Ride's on Me"
7. "The Emerald Key"
8. "She Doesn't Like Surrender"
9. "Memory Dust"
10. "Good Witch?"
11. "Something Wicked This Way Comes"
12. "Kansas 1889"
13. "Good Witch of Manhattan"
14. "One Way Ticket to Oz"
15. "Oz Suite"

== See also ==
- The Wonderful Wizard of Oz
- The Wizard of Oz (1939 film)
- Adaptations of The Wizard of Oz
- List of films about witchcraft
