= Jolly Roger: Massacre at Cutter's Cove =

- DVD cover
- Directed by: Gary Jones
- Written by: Gary Jones; Jeffrey Miller
- Produced by: David Michael Latt; David Rimawi; Sherri Strain
- Starring: Rhett Giles; Tom Nagel; Kristina Korn; Thomas Downey
- Cinematography: David Robert Jones
- Edited by: William Shaffer
- Music by: Mel Lewis
- Production company: The Asylum
- Distributed by: The Asylum
- Release date: May 31, 2005
- Running time: 80 minutes
- Country: United States
- Language: English
- Budget: $500,000

Jolly Roger: Massacre at Cutter's Cove is a 2005 American horror film by The Asylum, written by Gary Jones and Jeffrey Miller and directed by Jones, and starring Rhett Giles as Jolly Roger.

== Premise ==
The evil pirate Roger LaForge, better known as Jolly Roger, comes back from the dead to kill the descendants of his crew who mutinied against him 300 years earlier.

== Cast ==
- Rhett Giles as Roger "Jolly Roger" LaForge
- Tom Nagel as Alex Weatherly
- Kristina Korn as Jessie Hendrickson
- Thomas Downey as Chief Mathis
- Kim Little as Detective Lowenstein
- Pamela Munro as Mayor Judith Bates
- Dean N. Arevalo as Deputy Tanner
- Sergio Samayoa as Deputy Yee
- Justin Brannock as Tom Torrington
- Megan Lee Ethridge as Sasha
- Hajar Northern as Eve
- Ted Cochran as Phillip
- Conrad Angel Corral as Mr. Sims
- Spencer Jones as Abernathy
- Amanda Barton as Agnes
- Griff Furst as William Barrows
- Kellie McKuen as Zelda
- Leigh Scott as Ray
- Berna Roberts as Carla
- Carrie Booska as Melinda "Bambi" Cornwell
- Ty Nickelberry as Danny Ray, The Bouncer
- Coleman McClary as Hancock

== Release ==
The film was released on DVD by Mosaic on November 28, 2005. In 2007, it released by Terra and Timeless Media on April 3, and June 5 respectively.

== Reception ==
Critical reception for the film was mostly negative.

Dread Central gave the film a score of 2 1/2 out of 5 the reviewer stating, "While I enjoyed the slashing antics of Jolly Roger, as slight as they may have been at times, that ending did not leave me wanting more". Michael Helms from Digital Retribution.com gave the film a positive review, awarding the film a score of 4 / 5 stating, "Although there might have been a little more work performed on Jolly Roger himself to make him much stronger in the Wishmaster sense of second tier horror franchise characters, the bottom line is this film delivers the gory goods". Rick Blalock from Terror Hook.com gave the film a mixed score of 5.5/10, complimenting the film's gore and sharp editing bur criticized the film's "cheesy" plot and slow start. Andrew Smith of Popcorn Pictures awarded the film a score of 4/10, writing, "Jolly Roger: Massacre at Cutter’s Cove is harmless enough fun but it could have been a much greater throwback to the 80s slasher film had the script been tighter and the character of Roger been taken more seriously."

Film Threat gave the film a positive review, writing, " While just as dumb as Death Valley: the Legend of Bloody Bill, Jolly Roger is way more fun. And with a decapitation nearly every two minutes, director Jones certainly knows how to keep the red flowing."
