= The 9/11 Commission Report (film) =

2006 American drama film

- DVD promotional poster
- Directed by: Leigh Scott
- Written by: Leigh Scott
- Based on: Final Report of the National Commission on Terrorist Attacks Upon the United States
- Produced by: David Michael Latt; Sherri Strain
- Starring: Rhett Giles
- Cinematography: Steven Parker
- Edited by: Kristen Quintrall; Leigh Scott
- Music by: Eliza Swenson
- Distributed by: The Asylum
- Release date: June 28, 2006
- Running time: 86 minutes
- Country: United States
- Language: English

The 9/11 Commission Report is a 2006 American drama film produced by The Asylum. It was written and directed by Leigh Scott, and was released in June 2006. The film stars Rhett Giles.

== Plot ==
Using the 9/11 Commission's final report on its investigation into the September 11 attacks, published in the 9/11 Commission Report, as historical background, The 9/11 Commission Report is a non-fiction drama film whose plot follows all of the developments leading up to and through the attacks in New York City and at The Pentagon on September 11, 2001.

== Reception ==
Steve Anderson of Film Monthly and Film threat stated that the film "has quality, and in spades. The 9/11 Commission Report is a surprisingly clever piece of historical dramatization." And also said: "All in all, The 9/11 Commission Report is a stark, gripping, and ultimately chilling display of the events surrounding and leading up to the United States' single biggest non-natural catastrophe."

== Cast ==
- Rhett Giles as Mike
- Jeff Denton as Jack
- Eliza Swenson as Rosalind
- Sarah Lieving as Valerie
- Marat Glazer as Yousef
