= Exorcism: The Possession of Gail Bowers =

- DVD cover
- Directed by: Leigh Scott
- Written by: Leigh Scott
- Produced by: David Michael Latt
- Starring: Erica Roby; Griff Furst; Thomas Downey; Noel Thurman
- Edited by: Leigh Scott; Kristen Quintrall
- Music by: Eliza Swenson
- Distributed by: The Asylum
- Release date: January 31, 2006
- Running time: 91 minutes
- Country: United States
- Language: English
- Budget: $20,000

Exorcism: The Possession of Gail Bowers is a 2006 American horror film by The Asylum, written and directed by Leigh Scott. It is considered to be a mockbuster of the 2005 film The Exorcism of Emily Rose.

== Plot ==
The film takes place in an undisclosed part of Florida, in which a priest, Father Thomas Bates, is called upon to help exorcise Gail Bowers, who has come to be possessed by malevolent forces. Father Bates is first alerted to the matter by a local couple, Clark and Anne Pederson. Clark, a worker for Blackthorn Industries, tells of the problems that the neighborhood faces as the result of Gail's possessions, and that medical science has failed to make amends.

Using what powers are available, Father Bates visits Gail in her home and begins to perform an exorcism. It is during this service that the malevolent forces possessing Gail begin to fight back against the priest, and force themselves to be revealed for the first time.

== Reception ==
HorrorTalk commented that the film had a strong start and finish, but suffered in the middle. They also felt that its lead actress, Erica Roby, was "just not experienced enough to pull off such a demanding role".

== See also ==
- Dead Men Walking - Another horror film by The Asylum film studio, which was referenced in this film
- Anneliese: The Exorcist Tapes - A 2011 mockbuster of Paranormal Activity 3 based on Anneliese Michel, the same basis as The Exorcism Of Emily Rose which Gail Bowers is a mockbuster of.
