= Elvis Has Left the Building =

- German DVD cover
- Directed by: Joel Zwick
- Written by: Mitchell Ganem; Adam-Michael Garber
- Produced by: Sharon Harel; Tova Laiter; Jane Barclay; Susanne Bohnet; Nava Levin; Manfred D. Heid; Gerd Koechlin; Josef Lautenschlager; Hannah Leader; Andreas Thiesmeyer
- Starring: John Corbett; Kim Basinger; Annie Potts; Sean Astin; Mike Starr; Phill Lewis; Denise Richards; Philip Charles MacKenzie; Tom Hanks
- Cinematography: Paul Elliott
- Edited by: Heather Persons
- Music by: David Kitay
- Production companies: Capitol Films; Equity Pictures Medienfonds GmbH & Co. KG
- Distributed by: Lions Gate Films
- Release date: March 26, 2004
- Running time: 90 minutes
- Country: United States
- Language: English
- Budget: $11.5 million

Elvis Has Left the Building is a 2004 American black comedy film directed by Joel Zwick and starring Kim Basinger as a cosmetics saleswoman who accidentally kills a series of Elvis impersonators as she travels to a convention in Las Vegas. John Corbett plays an advertising executive and her love interest. Tom Hanks has a cameo appearance as one of the dead Elvis impersonators. Angie Dickinson plays Basinger's mother, a former mechanic for the real Elvis.

== Plot ==
The film opens with Harmony (Basinger) driving down a long, winding road, the music of Elvis playing on the radio. She feels that her life is empty and artificial. She is a traveling cosmetic saleswoman, setting up "Pink Lady" training seminars in the western portion of the United States. When she is asked if she's "one of those Mary Kaye ladies," she replies, "No, we're pink, they're more salmon." While she is popular and successful selling "Pink Lady," there is nothing real or honest in her life.

As Harmony travels around the country, trying to figure out what is missing from her life, Elvis impersonators keep dying in her wake. She is romantically pursued by Miles (Corbett).

== Cast ==
- Kim Basinger as Harmony Jones
- John Corbett as Miles Taylor
- Annie Potts as Shirl
- Sean Astin as Aaron
- Mike Starr as Sal
- Phill Lewis as Charlie
- Denise Richards as Belinda
- Philip Charles MacKenzie as Darren Swirl
- David Leisure as Hole-in-the-Head Elvis
- Tom Hanks as Mailbox Elvis
- Joel Zwick as Squashed Elvis
- Richard Kind as Burning Elvis
- Angie Dickinson as Bobette
- Pat Morita as Man in Turban
- Gil McKinney as Young Elvis

== Production ==
- Jane Barclay ... executive producer
- Sharon Harel ... producer
- Manfred D. Heid ... associate producer (as Manfred Heid)
- Gerd Koechlin ... associate producer
- Tova Laiter ... producer
- Josef Lautenschlager ... executive producer
- Hannah Leader ... executive producer
- Nava Levin ... co-producer
- Andreas Thiesmeyer ... executive producer
- Susanne Bohnet ... co-producer (uncredited)

== Soundtrack ==
These songs appear in the film, listed alphabetically.

- "Ain't Got You" performed by Joey Scarbury
- "A Little Less Conversation" performed by Mike Star and Phill Lewis
- "Always On My Mind" performed Kim Basinger and John Corbett
- "An American Trilogy" performed by Roger Jameson
- "Burning Love" performed by Melissa Etheridge
- "Different Man" performed by Mark Dauenhauser
- "Down By The Riverside" performed by Gil McKinney
- "Follow That Dream" performed by Elvis Presley
- "Get Back Up Again" performed by Jeff Pescetto
- "Hard Headed Woman" performed by Elvis Presley
- "Heartbreak Hotel" performed by Elvis Presley
- "Hound Dog" performed by Elvis Presley
- "I Got Stung (Paul Oakenfold Remix)" performed Elvis Presley
- "I'm So Lonesome I Could Cry" performed by Jeff Pescetto
- "It's A Long Lonely Highway" performed by Elvis Presley
- "It's Now or Never" performed by Babyface
- "I Want You, I Need You, I Love You" performed by Elvis Presley
- "The King" performed by Randy Crenshaw
- "Looking for Love" performed by Jeff Pescetto
- "The Longest Goodbye" performed by Tim Gales
- "Love Me Tender" performed by Norah Jones and Adam Levy
- "Love You Till The Day I Die" performed Jeff Pescetto
- "Mariachi Mango" performed by Brian Dimillo
- "Miracle" performed by Rachel Robinson
- "One Night" performed by Richard Kind
- "Return to Sender" performed by Elvis Presley
- "Rockin' My Way Across Town" performed by Mark Dauenhauser
- "Runnin Scared" performed by Jeff Pescetto
- "Starry Night performed by Peter Grant
- "Wild For You Baby" performed by Rockin' Ryan and the real Goners
