= Bram Stoker's Dracula's Curse =

- DVD cover
- Directed by: Leigh Scott
- Written by: Leigh Scott
- Produced by: David Michael Latt; Paul Bales; David Rimawi
- Starring: Thomas Downey; Rhett Giles; Christina Rosenberg; Eliza Swenson
- Cinematography: Steven Parker
- Edited by: Leigh Scott
- Music by: The Divine Madness
- Distributed by: The Asylum
- Release date: April 25, 2006
- Running time: 90 minutes
- Country: United States
- Language: English

Bram Stoker's Dracula's Curse (also known simply as Dracula's Curse) is a 2006 horror film by The Asylum, written and directed by Leigh Scott. Despite featuring Bram Stoker's name in the title, the film is not directly based on any of his writings or a mockbuster to the 1992 film Bram Stoker's Dracula, but shares similarities to films such as Blade: Trinity, Dracula 2000, Underworld: Evolution and Van Helsing. The film also shares some similarities with the 1971 Hammer horror film Countess Dracula, which also features a Dracula-esque femme fatale in the lead role.

== Plot ==
The film takes place in an unidentified city (presumably New York City) in the modern day, and follows the characters of Rufus King (Thomas Downey) and Jacob Van Helsing (Rhett Giles), both of whom have been observing recent attacks on young teenagers in the city at night. Van Helsing correctly identifies that the attacks are being carried out by a group of vampires residing in the city. The vampires are led by a foreign seductress named Countess Ezabet Bathorly (Christina Rosenberg), who hopes to use the humans to feed her growing vampire clan and to eventually seize control of the city, while at the same time using her growing power to gain the powers of "the Master". Discovering Bathory's plan, Van Helsing and King begin to hunt down and destroy the vampires one by one, until they finally face the Countess herself and try to kill her once and for all, before her evil consumes the city and allows Dracula's curse to consume the human race.

== Reception ==
Critical reaction to Dracula's Curse has been mixed to positive. Scott Foy of Dread Central wrote, "Bram Stoker's Dracula's Curse isn't a bad movie. If you're looking for a vampire film cut from the same cloth as Vampire: The Masquerade or the short-lived TV series Kindred: The Embraced then you'll probably dig Bram Stoker's Dracula's Curse, but you'll need to have a little patience." Patrick Luce of Monsters and Critics said, "Although at times some of the acting is a bit stiff and the special effects are a bit lacking, Bram Stoker's Dracula's Curse ... is still packed full of enough gun fights, sword fights and vampire action to deliver a 'popcorn' rollercoaster ride of a fun movie."

Trash City's review stated, "Though falling some way short of perfection, if you liked Hellsing (the anime) or Ultraviolet (the Brit-TV show), then this will probably still be of interest, and is entertaining as such. But if your tastes run more to the fast 'n' furious style of vampire cinema which Hollywood currently prefers, then it's likely less recommended." Horror DNA's review said, "[It's] the best movie The Asylum has to offer. ... Scott has crafted something slick in Bram Stoker's Dracula's Curse. It is a perfect starting point for those wanting to delve into the low-budget world."

== Cast ==
- Thomas Downey as Rufus King
- Eliza Swenson as Gracie Johannsen
- Rhett Giles as Jacob Van Helsing
- Christina Rosenberg as Countess Bathory
- Jeff Denton as Rafe
- Amanda E. Barton as Darvulia
- Tom Nagel as Rick Tattinger
- Rebekah Kochan as Trixie McFly
- Sarah Hall as Sadie McPherson
- Derek Osedach as Jimmy "The Kid" D'Amico
- Chriss Anglin as Rich "Nebraska" Zulkowski
- Sarah Lieving as Alex Deveraux
- Griff Furst as Konstantinos
- Justin L. Jones as Vampire
- Marie Westbrook as Anastasia Ravenwood
- Marat Glazer as Ivan Iwazkiewicz
- Vaz Andreas as Tsorak
- Jennifer Lee Wiggins as Dorthea
- Vanessa Rooke as Katarina
- Noel Thurman as Denise
- Erica Roby as Christina Lockheart
- David Schick as Lord Treykahn
- Leigh Scott as The Old One
- Mia Moretti as Juditha
- Joanna Houghton as Helena
- Ella Holden as Abigail Johannsen
- Troy Thomas as Orlock
- Ruffy Landayan as Lau
- Monique La Barr as Erzsi
- Katayoun Dara as Lexy
- Kat Ochsner as Magdalena
- Crystal Napoles as Selene
