= Dragon (2006 film) =

- Directed by: Leigh Scott
- Written by: Leigh Scott
- Produced by: Justin Jones; David Michael Latt; David Rimaw; Sherri Strain; Rick Walker
- Starring: Jon-Paul Gates; Amelia Jackson-Gray; Matt Wolf; Jeff Denton; Eliza Swenson
- Cinematography: Steven Parker
- Edited by: Kristin Quintrall; Leigh Scott
- Music by: Eliza Swenson
- Distributed by: The Asylum
- Release date: December 12, 2006
- Running time: 85 minutes
- Country: United States
- Language: English
- Budget: $500,000

Dragon is a 2006 action/fantasy film created by the independent film group The Asylum.

== Plot ==
The film takes place in the forest of Sidhe, following Princess Alora on her journey to Bagnor Brim to seek the aid of Lord Blackthorne against the dark elves waging war on humanity throughout the realm. Attacked by dark elves, the Princess is saved by the warriors Lord Artemir and Cador Bain. The two warriors insist that they accompany Princess Alora on her quest to act as her guardians and warn her of the dragon which dwells within the forest.

Princess Alora and the two warriors are ambushed by a trio of bandits (Gareth Morholt, Naga, and Sogomo) who identify themselves as the Kensington Vassals, famous for having slain a dragon. Princess Alora promises the three land and title in exchange for their knowledge and assistance, to which the Vassals agree despite tension between Gareth, Lord Artemir, and Cador.

As the group's passage through the forest continues, they encounter an elf named Damara and her mistress Freyja, a mysterious necromancer. Freyja cryptically forewarns that not all of Alora's companions shall survive their trek, but one is destined to slay the dragon. Declaring that she shall render them aid, Freyja and Damara join the Princess as well. The necromancer easily takes measure of the group's character, noting the budding romance between Cador and Alora.

The group is taken by surprise when the dragon attacks them, and their attempts to fight the beast do little to injure it. Sogomo is trapped under a tree felled by the dragon during the fray and, horrified, the party can do nothing but watch as the dragon devours him.

Once the Princess and her band flee and regroup, Freyja takes Alora aside to divulge a new strategy for defeating the beast. The necromancer reveals that she was responsible for creating the dragon many years ago to fight the dark elves at the behest of Alora's father, the king. Unable to control the beast, however, Freyja did what little she could to confine it to the forest of Sidhe. Confiding that the dragon's death shall mean the necromancer too shall die, Freyja also gives Alora a wand made of a small tree branch to use against the dragon. The Princess bestows a knighthood upon Cador for his valor, grimly noting that there may not be another chance to do so.

The group decides to seek the dragon in its lair, and prepare to attack the sleeping beast only to be ambushed themselves by a band of dark elves. Naga continues to fight despite being shot with several arrows until she succumbs to the fatal wounds. The Princess and her accompaniment of warriors fend off the elves in time to turn their attention to the awoken dragon. Lord Artemir attempts a valiant charge only to be consumed in a gout of flame, perishing.

The wand given to Alora transforms into a spear, and the Princess pierces the dragon's heart. As the dragon dies, Freyja collapses and confides in her dying breath that Alora was her daughter. Reinforcements of dark elves arrive but concede victory and allegiance to the Princess as she brandishes the spear aloft in triumph.

Though the dragon is defeated and the war with the dark elves is brought to an end, the group of adventurers gathers for the bittersweet funeral of their fallen comrades. The king dies during Princess Alora's return journey, but she ascends to rule the kingdom with Sir Cador at her side.

== Cast ==
- Amelia Jackson-Gray as Princess Alora Vanir
- Matthew Wolf as Sir Cador Bain
- Jon-Paul Gates as Lord Artemir
- Jeff Denton as Gareth Morholt
- Rachel Haines as Naga
- Jason DeParis as Sogomo
- Jessica Bork as Damara
- Eliza Swenson as Freyja
- Kurt Altschwager as Dark Elf Slynn
- Tyler Constable as Dark Elf Sulin

== Soundtrack ==
The score was composed by Eliza Swenson, who also portrayed Freyja in the film.

== Release and reception ==
Dragon was released direct to DVD on December 12, 2006.

Like many other films produced by The Asylum, Dragon has been dubbed a "mockbuster" by critics, many drawing a parallel between the release of Dragon and the film adaptation of Eragon.

Rotten Tomatoes gave it a 38% score, meaning rotten with viewer reviews that stated things like "Utter rubbish! epic action adventure, this film should be taken from the shelves under the trades descriptions act for misrepresentation."

Christopher Armstead of Film Critics United gave Dragon a positive review, opining that the CGI was almost passable despite some rough spots. He described the film's fight sequences as "some of the worst staging I’d ever seen as it looked like the actors were simply trying not to get hurt as opposed to actually fighting each other." Armstead stated that the film was enjoyable in comparison to others by The Asylum, commenting, "if you can stand the scores and scores and scores of tireless dialog."

Eric "The Hitman" Strauss at Horrortalk qualified the film as being "a fun way to spend an afternoon," and that "Dragon is a movie that relies on the kind of familiar fantasy stories that are the key to any good weekend D&D game." He also noted that the budgetary constraints and production were not intended to be on par with a mainstream fantasy film, instead pointing out the appeal to any tabletop or card game fan who "will be able to relate to the characters and quest."
