= Invasion of the Pod People =

- Directed by: Justin Jones
- Written by: Leigh Scott
- Produced by: David Michael Latt; David Rimawi; Paul Bales
- Starring: Erica Roby; Jessica Bork; Sarah Lieving; Danae Nason; Shaley Scott
- Cinematography: Bianca Bahena; Leigh Scott
- Edited by: Kristen Quintrall
- Music by: Chris Ridenhour
- Distributed by: The Asylum
- Release date: July 2007
- Running time: 90 minutes
- Country: United States
- Language: English

Invasion of the Pod People (released in some countries as Invasion: The Beginning) is a 2007 science-fiction film produced by The Asylum.

Like several other films by The Asylum, Invasion of the Pod People is a mockbuster whose release coincided with the premiere of The Invasion, although the plot of Pod People borrowed heavily from the 1956 film Invasion of the Body Snatchers, of which The Invasion is a reworking.

== Plot ==
The film is about Melissa (Erica Roby), a young woman living in Los Angeles, who works for a large corporation.

One night, there is a freak meteor shower. The next morning, Melissa goes about her day but as time passes, slowly becomes aware that those around her have changed since the meteorites fell. It's as if their minds are no longer their own. For example, Melissa's supervisor Samantha seduces her into a passionate lesbian encounter, even though Samantha had never shown any signs of being a lesbian.

Melissa soon realizes that the townsfolk have been replaced by a race of aliens known as Pod People. The aliens grow in large seed pods and gradually take the form of a particular person, eventually taking over their bodies once the growth process is complete. The Pod People try to take control of Melissa, but she flees the town to warn humanity of the invasion in progress.

== Cast ==
- Erica Roby as Melissa
- Jessica Bork as Samantha
- Sarah Lieving as Louise
- Danae Nason as Billie
- Shaley Scott as Taylor
- Michael Tower as Vickland
- David Shick as Andrew
- Amanda Ward as Casey
- Marat Glazer as Detective Pete Alexander
- Lorraine Smith as Bailey
- Leigh Scott as Zach
- Elliot Salter as The Pawnbroker
- Justin Jones as James
- Nat Magnuson as The Photographer

== Reception ==
Stefan Birgir Stefansson of sbs.is heavily criticized the film, writing that it "Looks like it was made by a film student who thinks he's the real deal, even though he can't grasp how light or sound really works. An idiotic remake that puts everyone involved to shame and perhaps, a place in hell! And yes, pod-people=lesbians..." Dread Central wrote a mixed review, as they felt it was "okay for what it is; an instantly forgettable retread neither deserving of much praise nor scorn."

== See also ==
- The Day the Earth Stopped – A similar film produced by The Asylum in 2008
- Invasion of the Body Snatchers – The original 1956 film on which Pod People is based
- The Invasion – A similar film released in the same year
- Strange Invaders – A 1983 film based on the same concept of alien possession
- H. G. Wells' War of the Worlds, another Asylum film that was titled internationally as Invasion
