= Denise Richards =

American actress and model (born 1971)

- Richards at Dragon Con in 2026
- Born: Denise Lee Richards; February 17, 1971 (age 55); Downers Grove, Illinois, U.S.
- Occupations: Actress; television personality; model
- Years active: 1989–present
- Spouses: Charlie Sheen (m. 2002; div. 2006) Aaron Phypers (m. 2018; sep. 2025)
- Children: 3 (Note: 2 biological & 1 adopted)

Denise Lee Richards (born February 17, 1971) is an American actress, model and television personality. She rose to prominence with roles in the science fiction film Starship Troopers (1997), the erotic thriller film Wild Things (1998) and the James Bond film The World Is Not Enough (1999). Her performance as the Bond girl Christmas Jones gave Richards her mainstream breakthrough.

Richards has appeared in films such as the comedies Drop Dead Gorgeous (1999), Undercover Brother (2002), Scary Movie 3 (2003), Love Actually (2003) and Madea's Witness Protection (2012), the slasher Valentine (2001), the dramas Edmond (2005) and Jolene (2008) and the musical thriller American Satan (2017). Her television roles include the sitcom Blue Mountain State (2010–2011), the mystery thriller series Twisted (2013–2014) and the soap opera The Bold and the Beautiful (2019–2022). She returned to the soap in May of 2026.

Richards has starred on reality series such as Denise Richards: It's Complicated (2008–2009), The Real Housewives of Beverly Hills (2019–2020, 2023–2024, 2026) and Denise Richards & Her Wild Things (2025). In 2011, she published a memoir, The Real Girl Next Door, which became a New York Times Best Seller.

== Early life ==
Richards was born in Downers Grove, Illinois, to Joni (née Braden), a coffee shop owner, and Irv Richards, a telephone engineer. Her mother died of cancer in November 2007. She has said that her ancestry includes German and French heritage. Richards has a younger sister, Michelle. She grew up in both Downers Grove and Mokena, Illinois. As a child, she was the "only girl on the baseball team."

When Richards was 15 years old, her family moved to Oceanside, California. In 1989, she graduated from El Camino High School. She was voted best looking in her high school yearbook. Richards was raised Catholic. After her high school graduation, she began working as a model and traveled to cities such as Paris, New York, and Tokyo to do photo shoots and commercials.

== Career ==
=== 1990s: Immediate breakthrough and stardom ===
Richards began her career as a teenager in modeling and appeared in print ads for Bonne Bell cosmetics in 1991. She also appeared on the cover of Teen magazine; in an instructional video, "Modeling: What It Takes"; and later in Max Factor's Premiere 2K advertising campaign.

In the 1990s, Richards appeared in several films and television shows such as Loaded Weapon 1 (1993), Tammy and the T-Rex (1994), Lookin' Italian (1994) and guest starring in episodes of Saved by the Bell, Married... with Children and Doogie Howser, M.D. In 1993, she portrayed Ben Affleck's character's girlfriend named Jodi Collins, in the short-lived drama series Against the Grain. Richards made guest appearances in several television shows, including Beverly Hills, 90210 (1992), Seinfeld (1993), Lois & Clark: The New Adventures of Superman (1994) and a guest-arc in Melrose Place (1996). In 1995, Richards appeared in a made-for-TV movie In the Blink of an Eye, alongside Veronica Hamel and Mimi Rogers.

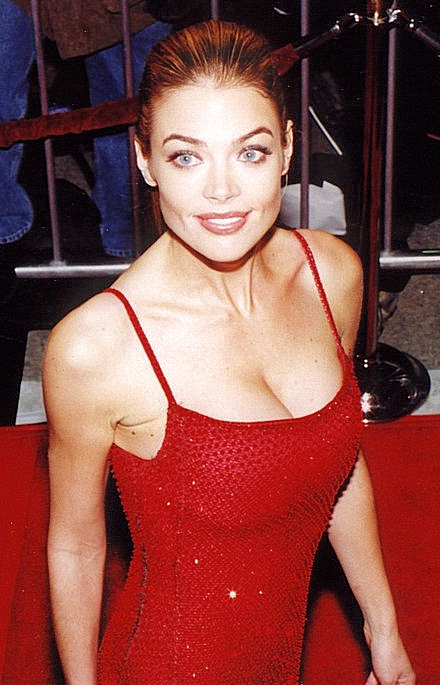
Richards at the premiere of The World Is Not Enough in 1999

Her first starring role in a wide theatrical release was Starship Troopers in 1997 for which Richards was nominated for the Blockbuster Entertainment Award for Favorite Female Newcomer. The film grossed a total of $121.2 million worldwide. In 2012, Slant Magazine ranked the film at number 20 on its list of the 100 Best Films of the 1990s. She followed this with a role in the erotic thriller film Wild Things (1998) alongside Kevin Bacon, Matt Dillon and Neve Campbell. Variety praised Richards's transition from good-girl-type roles to manipulative villainess and the review continued to include her as part of "an ensemble that appears to be enjoying the challenge of offbeat roles and unusual material. There's not a wrong note struck by the game group of players." In 2016, Glamour praised the film's female characters by describing Richards and Neve Campbell as "two of the most well-rounded, fascinating, and exciting characters to ever grace the screen."

Richards was cast as the nuclear physicist Christmas Jones in the James Bond film The World Is Not Enough (1999). Though she considered her role "brainy", "athletic", and having depth of character, she was criticized as not credible in the role. Her outfit, which often comprised a low-cut tank top and tight shorts, elicited unfavorable comments. Richards stated that a lot of viewers "made fun of" the character's attire but that "These Bond girls are so outrageous and if I did really look like a scientist, the Bond fans would have been disappointed." Richards was nominated for the Blockbuster Entertainment Award for Favorite Actress – Action, for the film. Later that year, Richards starred alongside Kirsten Dunst in the beauty pageant satire, Drop Dead Gorgeous. The film has gained new fans with time and is regarded as a cult film. Richards, playing a spoiled princess, was praised for her performance by Los Angeles Times for being "as rightly nasty as she is pretty".

=== 2000s: Mainstream and television work ===
In 2001, she guest-starred in Friends as Ross and Monica Geller's cousin, Cassie Geller in the episode "The One with Ross and Monica's Cousin". Later that year, she appeared in four episodes of Spin City as Jennifer Duncan, a love interest of Charlie Sheen's character. She starred as Sheen's character's ex-girlfriend two years later in two episodes of Two and a Half Men. Richards appeared in numerous films such as Valentine (2001), Good Advice (2001), Undercover Brother (2002), The Third Wheel (2002) and You Stupid Man (2002). She played Annie Logan in the horror comedy film Scary Movie 3 (2003), which was a commercial success and grossed $220 million worldwide. The film's plot significantly parodies the films The Ring, Signs, The Matrix Reloaded. Richards made a brief appearance in the British romantic comedy Love Actually (2003). In 2004, she appeared in two films, Whore and Elvis Has Left the Building.

In 2005, Richards had a lead role as publicist Jolene in the short-lived UPN soap opera Sex, Love & Secrets. The series focused on rich young adults living in Silver Lake, Los Angeles, and their secrets involving sex and love. She starred in the ensemble drama film Edmond (2005) alongside William H. Macy and Mena Suvari. In 2008, she reunited with her Wild Things on-screen mother Theresa Russell in the drama film Jolene (2008).

Her reality show Denise Richards: It's Complicated debuted on E! on May 26, 2008. The series followed the daily lives of Richards, her daughters Sam and Lola, and her married younger sister Michelle and father Irv. Entertainment Weekly published a review and wrote that "It's Complicated is one of those "celebs, they're just like us!" shows in which we're expected to enjoy watching a famous pampered person doing things we don't want to do either." The series concluded after two seasons on July 26, 2009.

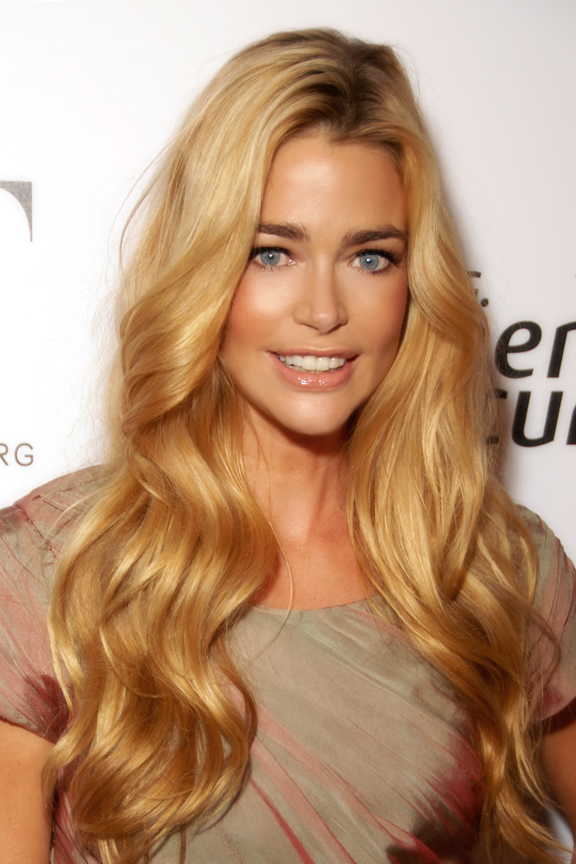
Richards in 2009

Richards appeared on season 8 of the dance competition television series Dancing with the Stars, paired with Maksim Chmerkovskiy. She was the second contestant eliminated on March 24, 2009. She landed the role of Autumn Bliss in the romantic comedy film Deep in the Valley (2009) alongside Kim Kardashian and Chris Pratt.

=== 2010s: Continued success in film and television ===
In 2010, she joined Paramount Network's sitcom Blue Mountain State as Debra Simon. The series is about a fictional university, Blue Mountain State, and its football team, the "Mountain Goats". It portrays certain aspects of American university life, including American football, sex, drinking, and partying. In February 2012, it was reported that Blue Mountain State would not be renewed for a fourth season. Over the years, due in large part to being streamable on Netflix, the series has developed a cult following. In July 2011, Richards published a memoir The Real Girl Next Door, a New York Times Best Seller. Richards decided to write a book because she "wanted to do something inspirational for other people going through challenging times," she told HuffPost in 2011. In September 2011, Richards reportedly turned down $100,000 to appear as an ex-girlfriend at Charlie Sheen's funeral in Two and a Half Men. A month later, she began filming a guest spot for an episode for the sixth season of NBC comedy series 30 Rock. Richards was part of TV Guide Network's show, Hollywood Moms' Club, which aired in November 2011.

Richards played Kate Needleman in the comedy film Madea's Witness Protection (2012), which grossed $67 million at the box office. Madea's Witness Protection was filmed in Atlanta in early 2012 and was released through 34th Street Films and Lionsgate. In 2012, Richards joined the cast of ABC Family's mystery-thriller television series Twisted. In 2015, she appeared in two films, Operation: Neighborhood Watch! and Christmas Trade. In 2016, she made a guest appearance as herself in The CW's Jane the Virgin, in the episode "Chapter Fifty-One." She portrayed Kat Faust in the musical thriller film American Satan (2017), for which Richards was nominated for the Festival Award for Best Supporting Actress in a Feature Film at the Northeast Film Festival. Later that year, Richards portrayed Temple Hampton in an episode of Bravo's comedy-drama series Girlfriends' Guide to Divorce. She starred in the supernatural horror film The Toybox (2018) opposite Mischa Barton. The film is about a family who go on a summer road trip in a used RV and get stranded in the desert by a supernatural force that is slowly killing them off. She portrayed Karen in the faith-based film The Prayer Box (2018), released on October 20, 2018.

In August 2018, Richards announced that she would be joining the Bravo reality series, The Real Housewives of Beverly Hills, for the show's ninth season, which premiered on February 12, 2019. Vanity Fair described her addition to the series by saying: "She might be one of the most famous people to join the Housewives franchise, someone who was a legitimate household name before becoming a reality star. Now, that doesn't always translate to on-screen gold, but it is a nice little coup for Bravo." The New York Times wrote that Richards "brought a refreshing and occasionally disarming dose of reality" to the series. On May 31, 2019, The Daily Beast wrote that "Richards's appearance on the show is the best kind of surprise, one that reveals that a celebrity is not who we may have assumed them to be. She's an extremely warm, loving parent, without a hint of narcissism or vapidity about her." Fox News called her "an instant fan favorite" when she joined the show in 2019. In 2019, she joined the cast of CBS's soap opera The Bold and the Beautiful as Shauna Fulton. "Shauna is a fun-loving, hard-working single mother from Las Vegas who aspires to live life to its absolute fullest," executive producer and headwriter Bradley Bell told People magazine. In July 2019, it was announced that Richards had joined the cast of Fox Broadcasting's comedy-drama television series BH90210 in a guest role, playing a fictionalized version of herself. She portrayed overly-ambitious mother Candice in Lifetime television film The Secret Lives of Cheerleaders, released on September 2, 2019. "I think the story's about this girl that's trying to fit in and makes some bad choices and then, knowing right from wrong, decided to make a better choice," Richards told Parade. On November 4, 2019, Richards appeared as a guest model on the game show The Price Is Right. Richards played Valerie in the Christmas film My Adventures with Santa (2019) opposite Patrick Muldoon. The film was released in limited theaters on November 15, 2019.

=== 2020s: Unscripted television and independent film output ===
Richards returned for The Real Housewives of Beverly Hills' tenth season, which premiered on April 15, 2020. On September 10, 2020, her representative confirmed that Richards is leaving the series after two seasons. In late 2020, Richards traveled to Spain to begin filming adventure drama series Glow & Darkness, portraying the role of Countess of Champagne. In 2020, she appeared in five films: Money Plane, Switched, Reality Queen!, Alpha Code and Timecrafters: The Treasure of Pirate's Cove. The heist film Money Plane was released to video-on-demand services on July 10, 2020, by Quiver Distribution. In Switched, released on September 4, 2020, Richards portrayed Victoria Sharp, the mother of a school bully. On August 28, 2021, she played Amanda in Lifetime's thriller film Killer Cheer Mom. The film follows a high school junior named Riley, who moved to a new town with her dad and stepmom, Amanda (Richards). In April 2023, it was confirmed that Richards would return to The Real Housewives of Beverly Hills, in a guest capacity for the thirteenth season.

On November 15, 2024, Fox announced that Richards would be one of fifteen contestants to appear on the third season of reality quasi-military training television series Special Forces: World's Toughest Test.

In March 2025, Richards starred in Denise Richards & Her Wild Things, a reality television series focusing on her and her family for Bravo. The series launched on E!. The show lasted for one season.

In August 2025, Richards made another return to The Real Housewives of Beverly Hills, appearing as a guest star for the fifteenth season.

== Other activities ==
=== Modeling ===
During her career, Richards has been on the cover of numerous magazines, including Cosmopolitan (Poland, Greece, US and Germany), Redbook, Details, Esquire, Self, Shape, GQ, Bella and Empire. In December 2004, she posed for a nude pictorial in Playboy magazine, five months after giving birth. Richards posed semi-nude for the July 2006 issue of Jane magazine to raise money for the Clothes Off Our Back Foundation. She has appeared in television commercials for Pepsi, Head & Shoulders, Secret, J.C. Penney, and Librero. Richards walked the runway at the "Max Factor Salutes Hollywood" fashion show on March 14, 2007, in Hollywood.

In 2010, Richards walked the runway for Ali Landry and Annie Kate Pons's fashion line, Belle Parish's fashion show. In 2012, Richards appeared in an infomercial for abdominal muscle toner "The Flex Belt" alongside Adrianne Curry, Lisa Rinna, and Janet Evans. In 2013, she became the brand ambassador for Oro Gold Cosmetics. In 2017, she appeared in furniture brand Urban Home's commercials and advertising campaigns. Richards has appeared in Blues Traveler's music video for "Canadian Rose" and Snoop Dogg's music video for "Undercova Funk". In September 2019, she walked the runway for Kyle Richards' and Shahida Clayton's new clothing brand at New York Fashion Week.

=== Philanthropy ===
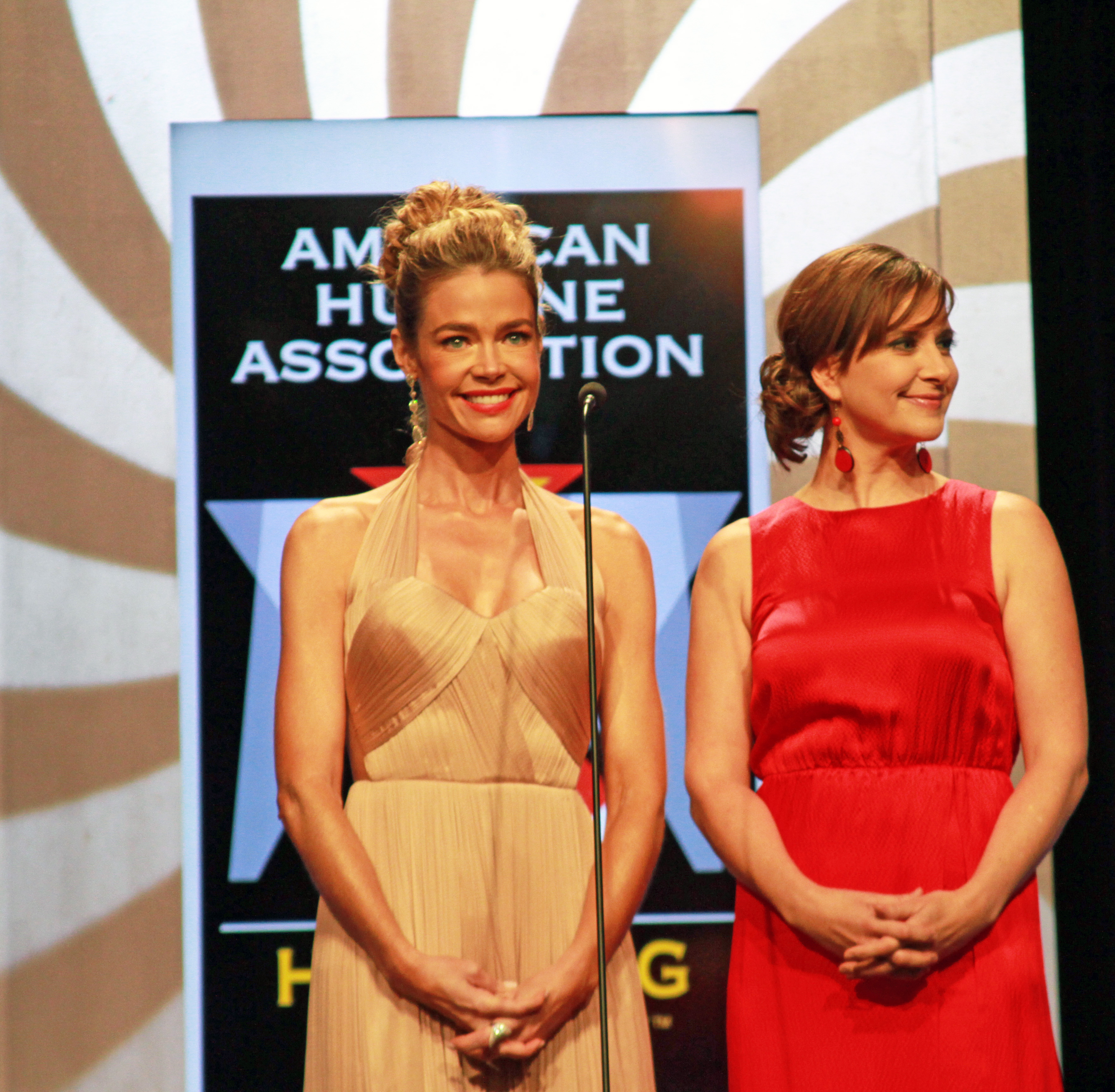
Richards (left) and Kellie Martin (right) at the American Humane Association 2012 Hero Dog Awards

Outside of work, Richards dedicates much of her time to philanthropy. She has supported numerous charities, including Dave Thomas Foundation for Adoption, Elizabeth Glaser Pediatric AIDS Foundation, Feeding America, Much Love Animal Rescue, Barbara Davis Center for Childhood Diabetes, Best Friends Animal Society, and Children's Hospital Los Angeles. Richards has also appeared in the NOH8 Campaign and has spoken in support of gay marriage.

Richards has worked with Best Friends Animal Society on several projects, including its Pup My Ride program, which transports small dogs from high-kill animal shelters to other parts of the US where there is a greater demand for small dogs. She promoted Best Friends Animal Society's Save Them All campaign in 2014. "I've been involved with Best Friends Animal Society since 2009 and I've seen firsthand the differences they've made and the countless lives they've saved," Richards said. She has regularly appeared on Access Hollywood's monthly pet segment showcasing shelter dogs rescued by Best Friends and available for adoption. While assisting with relief efforts in New York following Hurricane Sandy, she worked together with North Shore Animal League, and adopted a puppy from a Long Island shelter.

She has walked the runway for charity fashion shows, such as Susan G. Komen's 8th Annual Fashion For The Cure, Clothes Off Your Back Benefit and The Heart Truth's Red Dress Fall 2011 Collections. In January 2012, she launched her first collaboration with fashion subscription service ShoeDazzle to design the "Eloise" heel and raised over $15,000 for the Kidney Cancer Association. In December 2012, she designed two shoes for ShoeDazzle as part of their Celebrity Shoe Design Program for Charity. Profits from the shoe sales went to the Kidney Cancer Association. After Richards lost her mother to kidney cancer, she dedicated her time to raising awareness and helping the Kidney Cancer Association. In November 2015, Richards and her daughters spent Thanksgiving volunteering and serving food for homeless families.

In June 2018, she joined The Will Rogers Motion Picture Pioneers Foundation's summer theatrical PSA campaign to benefit Brave Beginnings, which funds vital neonatal equipment to U.S. hospitals. Richards filmed a public service announcement that was played at movie theaters nationwide.

=== Business ===
Richards launched her self-titled fragrance in spring 2012. In November 2019, Richards announced that she has developed a skincare line with CBme Beauty.

== Media image and legacy ==
Richards's appearance has often been the subject of media attention. In 1999, she was ranked No. 9 in Maxim's 50 Sexiest Women. In 2001, she was voted #2 in FHM's 100 Sexiest Women, #5 in FHM's 100 Sexiest Women and #19 in AskMen.com's 50 Most Beautiful Women. She was named one of the "100 Hottest Women of All-Time" by Men's Health. In 2002, Richards was ranked at number 21 in Stuff magazine's "102 Sexiest Women in the World." In 2011, Men's Health ranked her at number 61 on their list of "100 Hottest Women of All Time." Shape magazine ranked her at number 7 on their list of "10 of Our Fave Bond Girls: Then and Now."

In 2026, the asteroid 212501 Deniserichards was named in her honor.

== Personal life ==
Richards became engaged to actor Charlie Sheen on December 26, 2001, and they were married on June 15, 2002, at the estate of Spin City creator Gary David Goldberg. They have two daughters together. In March 2005, while pregnant with their second child, Richards filed for divorce from Sheen. She sought a restraining order against Sheen, alleging death threats against her. On April 19, 2006, Richards filed formal legal papers seeking a divorce from Sheen under the laws of the state of California. The divorce was finalized on November 30, 2006; Sheen was ordered to stay 300 feet away from his ex-wife and their daughters, except during supervised visits. In May 2010, Sheen surrendered legal custody of their daughters to Richards. They previously had joint legal custody of them. According to a source, Richards wanted sole legal custody, given Sheen's "marital turmoil, sobriety issues, and criminal problems" and he did not fight it. Under their divorce agreement, she had primary physical custody and he had visitation rights.

By mid-2012, Richards and Sheen were on good terms, often spending time together with their children. In 2012, Sheen made a cameo appearance in her movie Madea's Witness Protection, while Richards appeared in Sheen's television series Anger Management. In a move supported by Sheen, in May 2013, Richards was awarded temporary custody of his twin sons born in 2009 to Sheen and his wife Brooke Mueller, after the children were removed from Mueller's home by child protective services due to concerns over drug use.

In June 2011, Richards adopted a third daughter as a single parent. Richards adopted her at birth, following a two-year adoption process. Her daughter has a rare chromosomal disorder, Monosomy 8p, which affects her speech. Richards has worked on learning sign language to communicate with her.

In December 2017, Richards began dating Aaron Phypers before his divorce from Nicollette Sheridan was finalized. On September 8, 2018, Richards and Phypers married in Malibu, California. In May 2019, Richards announced that Phypers was adopting her youngest daughter. On July 7, 2025, Phypers filed for divorce from Richards in Los Angeles, citing irreconcilable differences and listing their date of separation as July 4.

Richards joined OnlyFans as a content creator in June 2022, as a gesture of support for another daughter, who had attracted criticism for launching her own account. She said that she believed "the creators of [OnlyFans] really took the best of every platform of social media and put it into one site," because as a creator, "you own your content. The other sites, they can sell your content." Richards earns a significant income via the site. Her friend, Tori Spelling, later admitted to subscribing with a pseudonymous account and spending over $400 on content and tips in two days.

In July 2025, Richards was granted a temporary restraining order against her estranged husband, Aaron Phypers, whom she accused of repeated domestic violence. According to court documents, Richards claimed she had been subjected to physical assault, strangulation, multiple concussions, and death threats. She also alleged that Phypers had engaged in digital surveillance of her private communications. One of the incidents reportedly occurred in early July, shortly before Phypers filed for divorce. He has strongly denied all allegations. In November 2025, Richards was granted a five-year restraining order against Phypers. Though Richards was still paying the bills for their rented home, Richards had moved out but stopped paying the rent for seven months in 2025. On December 30, 2025, a judge evicted both of them because neither had showed up in court.

== Filmography ==
=== Film ===
Year	Title	Role	Notes
1993	Loaded Weapon 1	Cindy	Film debut
1994	Lookin' Italian	Elizabeth	
1994	Tammy and the T-Rex	Tammy	
1997	Nowhere	Jana	
1997	Starship Troopers	Carmen Ibañez	
1998	Wild Things	Kelly Lanier Van Ryan	
1999	Drop Dead Gorgeous	Rebecca "Becky" Ann Leeman	
1999	The World Is Not Enough	Dr. Christmas Jones	
1999	Tail Lights Fade	Wendy	
2001	Valentine	Paige Prescott	
2001	Good Advice	Cindy Styne	
2002	Empire	Trish	
2002	Undercover Brother	Penelope Snow/White She-Devil	
2002	The Third Wheel	Diana Evans	
2002	You Stupid Man	Chloe	
2003	Love Actually	Carla	
2003	Scary Movie 3	Annie Logan	Cameo
2004	Whore	Rebecca Smith	
2004	Elvis Has Left the Building	Belinda	
2005	Edmond	B-girl	
2008	Blonde and Blonder	Dawn St. Dom	
2008	Jolene	Marin Leger	
2009	Finding Bliss	Bliss/Laura	
2009	Kambakkht Ishq	Denise Richards	Bollywood films
2009	Deep in the Valley	Autumn Bliss	
2011	Cougars, Inc.	Judy	
2012	Madea's Witness Protection	Kate Needleman	
2012	Freeloaders	Denise Richards	
2015	Operation: Neighborhood Watch!	Denise Sorensen	
2015	Christmas Trade	Chloe	
2016	A Life Lived	Elizabeth	
2017	Altitude	FBI Agent Gretchen Blair	
2017	American Violence	Dr. Amanda Tyler	
2017	American Satan	Kat Faust	
2017	A Violent Man	Victoria	
2017	Saturday at the Starlight	Mrs. Sproat	
2018	The Toybox	Jennifer	
2018	Destined to Ride	Aunt Glo	
2018	The Prayer Box	Karen	
2018	1st Born	Christine	
2019	Adventures of Dally & Spanky	Kelly Banks	
2019	My Adventures With Santa	Valerie Nolan	
2020	Reality Queen!	Angelina Streisand	
2020	Alpha Code	Johana	
2020	Money Plane	Sarah Peters	
2020	Switched	Victoria Sharp	
2020	Timecrafters: The Treasure of Pirate's Cove	Victoria Dare	
2021	Send It!	Catherine	
2022	Wickensburg	Celine Lucas	
2022	Love Accidentally	Debra	
2022	Junkyard Dogs	Monica Sullivan	
2022	My Christmas Fiancé	Ashleigh	
2023	The Line	Leanne	
2023	The Housekeeper	Kit Ash	
2023	A Christmas Frequency	Brooke Walkins	
2024	Angels Fallen: Warriors of Peace	Deborah	
2024	Return to Wickensburg	Celine Lucas	
2025	What She Doesn’t Know	Emily Sims	
2026	Dirty Hands	Sheila	
TBA	A Walking Miracle	Pamela	In production

=== Television ===
Year	Title	Role	Notes
1990	Life Goes On	Camille	Episode: "It Ain't All It's Cracked Up to Be"
1991	Saved by the Bell	Cynthia	Uncredited; episode: "The Last Weekend"
1991	Married... with Children	Girl #2	Episode: "Kelly Does Hollywood: Part 2"
1991	Doogie Howser, M.D.	Alissa	Episode: "Doogstruck"
1992	Eerie, Indiana	Girl #2	Episode: "Reality Takes a Holiday"
1992	Beverly Hills, 90210	Robin McGill	Episode: "Wedding Bell Blues"
1993	The Ben Stiller Show	Sunbathing girl	Uncredited; episode: "At the Beach"
1993	Seinfeld	Molly Dalrymple	Episode: "The Shoes"
1993	Bodies of Evidence	Jennifer Ivey	Episode: "Eleven Grains of Sand"
1993	In Living Color	n/a	Episode: "The Dirty Dozens"
1993	Against the Grain	Jodi Collins	2 episodes
1994	Burke's Law	Jennifer Taylor	Episode: "Who Killed the Beauty Queen?"
1994	Lois & Clark: The New Adventures of Superman	Angela	Episode: "Season's Greedings"
1995	P.C.H.	Jess	Television film
1995	One West Waikiki	Deirdre Mansfield	Episode: "Flowers of Evil"
1995	High Tide	Alex	Episode: "One on One"
1996	Weird Science	Valerie	Episode: "Funhouse of Death"
1996	Melrose Place	Brandi Carson	3 episodes
1996	In the Blink of an Eye	Tina Jacobs	Television film
1996	Pier 66	Colleen	Television film
2000	919 Fifth Avenue	Cathy Damore	Television film
2001	Friends	Cassie Geller	Episode: "The One with Ross and Monica's Cousin"
2001	Spin City	Jennifer Duncan	Recurring role; 5 episodes
2003, 2004	Two and a Half Men	Lisa	2 episodes
2003–2021	Entertainment Tonight	Herself	Guest and co-host; 27 episodes
2004	I Do (But I Don't)	Lauren Candell	Television film
2005	Sex, Love & Secrets	Jolene Butler	Main role
2006	Secrets of a Small Town	Brenda Rhodes	Unsold television pilot
2008–2009	Denise Richards: It's Complicated	Herself	Main role
2010–2011	Blue Mountain State	Debra Simon	Main role
2012	Blue Lagoon: The Awakening	Barbara Robinson	Television film
2012	Kickin' It	Leona	Episode: "Wedding Crashers"
2012	90210	Gwen Thompson	Episode: "902–100"
2012	30 Rock	Herself	2 episodes
2012–2013	Anger Management	Lori	2 episodes
2013–2014	Twisted	Karen Desai	Main role
2014	Fatal Acquittal	Nora Grant	Television film
2015; 2019–2020; 2023–2024; 2026	The Real Housewives of Beverly Hills	Herself	Reality series; 44 episodes
2015	A Christmas Reunion	Amy	Television film; also co-producer
2015	Significant Mother	Pepper Spinner	Episode: "Mixed Doubles"
2015	Vanity	Marion Bellerose	Main role
2016	Rock in a Hard Place	Heather	Episode: "Pilot"
2016	Jane the Virgin	Denise Richards	Episode: "Chapter Fifty-One"
2017	Girlfriends' Guide to Divorce	Temple Hampton	Episode: "Rule #776: The Cat Is Always on the Roof"
2017	A Girl Is A Gun	Nenuphar McBride	Streaming miniseries
2017	Tomboy	Shelley	Television film
2018	Christmas Break-In	Heather	Television film
2018	Alone Together	Jackie	Episode: "Fertility"
2019	The Secret Lives of Cheerleaders	Candice Scott	Television film
2019	BH90210	Denise Richards	Episode: "The Long Wait"
2019–2022, 2026	The Bold and the Beautiful	Shauna Fulton	Recurring role; 189 episodes
2020	Happy Hazel	Karen	2 episodes
2020–2021	FraXtur	Susan	2 episodes
2021	Killer Cheer Mom	Amanda	Television film
2021	Glow & Darkness	Countess of Champagne	Main role
2022	The Guardians of Justice	Laura Lang	Main voice role
2022	Second Chances		
2024	Paper Empire	Bentley	Main role
2025	Special Forces: World's Toughest Test	Herself	Contestant on season 3
2025	Denise Richards & Her Wild Things	Herself	Reality series
2025	aka Charlie Sheen	Herself	Documentary
2026	The Real Housewives Ultimate Girls Trip: Roaring 20th	Herself	Episode: "Roaring 20th: White Lies"
2026	All's Fair	Mrs. Keller	Episode: "Going Down"

=== Music videos ===
Year	Song	Artist	Notes
1997	"Canadian Rose"	Blues Traveler	Country music
2002	"Undercova Funk"	Snoop Dogg	
2017	"Lovely Blonde"	Sébastien Tellier	

== Bibliography ==
- Richards, Denise. The Real Girl Next Door. Gallery Books, 2011.

== Awards and nominations ==
Year	Association	Category	Work	Result
1998	Blockbuster Entertainment Awards	Favorite Female Newcomer	Starship Troopers	Nominated
1999	MTV Movie & TV Awards	Best Kiss (shared with Neve Campbell and Matt Dillon)	Wild Things	Nominated
2000	Blockbuster Entertainment Awards	Favorite Actress – Action	The World Is Not Enough	Nominated
2000	Golden Raspberry Awards	Worst Supporting Actress	The World Is Not Enough	Won
2000	Golden Raspberry Awards	Worst Screen Couple (shared with Pierce Brosnan)	The World Is Not Enough	Nominated
2004	Phoenix Film Critics Society Awards	Best Ensemble Acting (shared with the cast)	Love Actually	Nominated
2016	Los Angeles International Underground Film Festival	Best Actress	A Life Lived	Won
2017	Northeast Film Festival	Best Ensemble Cast (shared with the cast)	American Satan	Won
2017	Northeast Film Festival	Best Supporting Actress in a Feature Film	American Satan	Nominated
2018	Northeast Film Festival	Best Supporting Actress	The Toybox	Nominated
2020	Soap Hub Awards	Favorite Social Media Star	Herself	Nominated
2021	Soap Hub Awards	Favorite Actress	The Bold And The Beautiful	Nominated
