= The Prayer Box =

- Directed by: Kevan Otto
- Starring: Denise Richards, Reginald VelJohnson
- Production company: Pure Flix
- Release date: 2018
- Country: United States
- Language: English

The Prayer Box is a faith-based film, released in 2018 by Pure Flix. The film was directed by Kevan Otto, and stars Denise Richards, and Reginald VelJohnson.

== Production ==
Principal photography started in December 2017, while filming took place from December 4–20, 2017 in various areas in and around Brownsville and Edmonson County, Kentucky.

== Reception ==
"The ending feels a bit rushed, wrapping things up in the last ten minutes."
