= Tom Nagel =

American actor

- Born: Thomas J. Nagel; October 27, 1980 (age 45); Cleveland, Ohio
- Occupation: Film actor
- Years active: 2005–present
- Relatives: Brian (brother); Katlyn Nagel (sister)

Tom Nagel (born October 27, 1980) is an American actor noted for his roles in direct-to-video films, such as The Butcher, The Apocalypse, Pirates of Treasure Island, and Hillside Cannibals.

According to IMDb, Nagel left the U.S. Navy and settled in Los Angeles, where he began his film career.

In 2012, Nagel was cast in the Temple Immersive Audio AudioDrop production of Moonie the Starbabe based on Nick Cuti's classic underground comic character. The audio production is scheduled for release in April 2012. Nagel has appeared in other AudioDrop productions, including the popular show Red Colt.

In August 2013, he and brother Brian co–founded their production company Steel House Productions LLC.

== Filmography ==
Film
Year	Title	Role	Notes	Ref(s)
2005	Jolly Roger: Massacre at Cutter's Cove	Alex Weatherly		
2005	The Beast of Bray Road	Billy Loubes	Direct-to-video film	
2006	Hillside Cannibals	Bill		
2006	Bram Stoker's Dracula's Curse	Rick Tattinger		
2006	Pirates of Treasure Island	Jim Hawkins		
2006	The Butcher	Adam		
2007	The Apocalypse	Andrew		
2009	The Dead Matter	Mike		
2013	The Hitman	—N/a	Director and producer	
2013	Man of Steel	A–10 Pilot		
2013	The Retrieval	—N/a	Director and producer	
2015	The Burning Dead	Deputy Tisdale		
2016	ClownTown	—N/a	Director	
2018	The Toybox	—N/a	Director and producer	
