= Halloween Night =

- DVD cover
- Directed by: Mark Atkins
- Written by: Michael Gingold
- Story by: David Michael Latt
- Produced by: David Michael Latt; Sherri Strain
- Starring: Derek Osedach; Rebekah Kochan; Scot Nery
- Cinematography: David Michael Latt
- Edited by: Mark Atkins
- Music by: Mel Lewis
- Production company: The Asylum
- Distributed by: The Asylum
- Release date: October 24, 2006
- Running time: 110 minutes
- Country: United States
- Language: English

Halloween Night is a 2006 American slasher mockbuster film produced by The Asylum.

== Plot ==
The film follows Chris Vale, who was admitted to an asylum at the age of 12 after witnessing his mother's rape and murder by two thugs hired by his father (who subsequently committed suicide). Chris barely survived having his face burned by one of the thugs. Now a 22-year-old grossly disfigured young man, he escapes from the asylum on Halloween after killing two orderlies who mock his wearing of masks that resemble those the thugs were wearing.

His old home is now inhabited by David Bexter's family; Bexter hosts a Halloween party there with his girlfriend Shannon, his friends, and his schoolmates. Vale kills a party-goer named Todd and his girlfriend at a gas station, steals his costume and car, and drives to the party.

At the party, Vale is taken for Todd by everyone and starts a killing spree unnoticed. Meanwhile, David fakes a dispute with a friend who kidnaps Vale (still mistaken for Todd) with a gun and another friend disguised as a police officer, who is forced to hand over his car keys. After escaping with the car, the kidnapper is murdered by Vale, who goes back to the party in it. Because someone at the party has called the real police, the angry officer ends the party by telling everyone to go home, leaving only David, the now disappointed Shannon, and some friends.

Vale enters the house again, kills several of the remaining people, and ties up Shannon, who is wearing his mother's collar found in the house earlier. He breaks up a hole in the wall covered with boards where his father hid his mother's corpse before committing suicide.

As one girl escapes from the house in a panic, David begins to search for Shannon, finding her captured in the basement. After freeing her, Vale knocks David out from behind, but Shannon manages to grab a gun that Vale has lost, shooting him twice, presuming the killer for dead.

As the police and ambulance arrive later, David seems to have disappeared with the police searching for him. Suddenly, a bodybag behind a police officer talking to Shannon sits up. Shannon grabs the officer's gun, shooting and killing the person. After unzipping the bag, she is shocked to see that she killed David.

In the final scene, Vale is seen hitch-hiking and picked up by a car driver, who presumes him to be having a long Halloween party night. The film ends while the car leaves.

== Cast ==
- Derek Osedach as David Baxter
- Rebekah Kochan as Shannon
- Scot Nery as Christopher Vale
- Sean Durrie as Larry
- Alicia Klein as Tracy
- Erica Roby as Angela
- Amanda Ward as Kendall
- Jared Cohn as Daryll (credited as Jared Michaels)
- Jay Costelo as Eddie
- Michael Schatz as The Troll
- Amelia Jackson-Gray as Jeanine
- Nicholas Daly Clark as Todd
- Tank Murdoch as Officer Connors
- Stephanie Christine Medina as Kim
- Jonathan Weber as Charlie
- Shaun Dallas as Tom

== Reception ==
Cinema Crazed panned the movie, writing "as a "Halloween" wannabe, it's horrible, but as a slasher film on its own merits it's horrible". HorrorNews.net criticized some aspects of the film but also wrote "You get what you signed up for and therefore should be satisfied with that fact alone. Production is slick, score is eerie and the acting makes sense." Dread Central also heavily criticized the film, stating "Halloween Night is stupid slasher flick that’s sporadically amusing but mostly dull due to pacing issues, the predictable nature of the “seen it a million times before” storyline, and its insistence on taking itself far too seriously even when it's being outright dumb."

== See also ==
- List of films set around Halloween
- Halloween - another Halloween-themed film released around the same time
