= Denise Richards & Her Wild Things =

American reality television series

- Genre: Reality
- Starring: Denise Richards; Aaron Phypers; Lola Sheen; Sami Sheen; Eloise Richards
- Country of origin: United States
- Original language: English
- No. of seasons: 1
- No. of episodes: 8

Production
- Executive producers: Denise Richards; Alex Baskin; Jenn Levy; Joe Kingsley; Jeff Festa; Adam Griffin; Brian McCarthy; Brittany Nabors; Luke Neslage
- Running time: 22 minutes
- Production companies: 32 Flavors; Smoke & Mirrors Entertainment

Original release
- Network: Bravo
- Release: March 4 – April 8, 2025

Related
- Denise Richards: It's Complicated

Denise Richards & Her Wild Things is an American reality television series that premiered March 4, 2025, on Bravo. The series follows Denise Richards, her husband Aaron Phypers, and daughters Lola Sheen, Sami Sheen and Eloise Richards.

== Premise ==
The series follows Denise Richards as she navigates work and family life, with husband, Aaron Phypers, and daughters Lola Sheen, Sammi Sheen and Eloise Richards.

== Cast ==
- Denise Richards
- Aaron Phypers
- Lola Sheen
- Sami Sheen
- Eloise Richards

== Episodes ==
No.	Title	Original release date	Viewers (millions)
1	"Wild Beginnings"	March 4, 2025	0.491
2	"Spelling It All Out"	March 4, 2025	0.320
3	"Drop Dead Gorgeous Lizard"	March 11, 2025	0.356
4	"Only Pans"	March 11, 2025	0.306
5	"Yes, Chef!"	March 18, 2025	0.345
6	"Video Killed the Movie Star"	March 25, 2025	0.346
7	"My Dinner with Charlie"	April 1, 2025	0.400
8	"The Family that Photoshoots Together..."	April 8, 2025	0.368

== Production ==
In June 2024, it was announced E! had greenlit a reality television series focusing on Denise Richards and her family. In July 9, 2025, Bravo Network cancelled Denise Richards & Her Wild Things after one season.
