= The Toybox =

2018 American film

- Promotional poster
- Directed by: Tom Nagel
- Written by: Jeff Denton; Jeff Miller; Brian Nagel; Tom Nagel
- Produced by: Eric Brenner; Jeff Denton; Jim Jacobsen; Doug Kramer; Ronnie D. Lee; Jeff Miller; Tom Nagel; Brian Nagel
- Starring: Mischa Barton; Denise Richards
- Cinematography: Ken Stachnik
- Edited by: Tom Nagel
- Music by: Holly Amber Church
- Distributed by: CineTel Films
- Release dates: May 5, 2018 (Texas Frightmare Weekend); September 18, 2018
- Country: United States
- Language: English

The Toybox is a 2018 American supernatural horror film directed by Tom Nagel and starring Mischa Barton and Denise Richards. The film wrapped production in April 2017 and was then acquired by CineTel Films with an aim of launching sales at both the 2017 Cannes Film Festival and the American Film Market. A promotional trailer was released on April 4, 2018. The film was also accepted into a coveted screening slot at the Texas Frightmare Weekend in May 2018. The film was released in theaters and on VOD on September 18, 2018. Entertainment Weekly released the exclusive trailer on August 17, 2018.

== Plot ==
Jennifer (Richards) and her family go on a summer road trip in a used RV with her husband's estranged father and brother. Along the way, they find Samantha (Barton) and her brother, broken down on the side of the highway. After driving into the middle of nowhere, the RV takes on a mind of its own, crashing and stranding them in the scorching and isolated desert. Little by little, the unsuspecting group of travelers is blindsided by the terrible secrets within the walls of the RV and find themselves fighting to survive.

== Cast ==
- Mischa Barton as Samantha
- Denise Richards as Jennifer
- Matt Mercer as Mark
- Brian Nagel as Jay
- Greg Violand as Charles
- Malika Michelle as Olivia
- Jeff Denton as Steve
- Carolyne Maraghi as Mary, mother of the missing child
- David Greathouse as Robert Gunthry
- Katie Keene as Ghost Girl

== Reception ==
On Rotten Tomatoes the film has an approval rating of 31% based on reviews from 13 critics.
