= Eliza Swenson =

American actress and singer (born 1982)

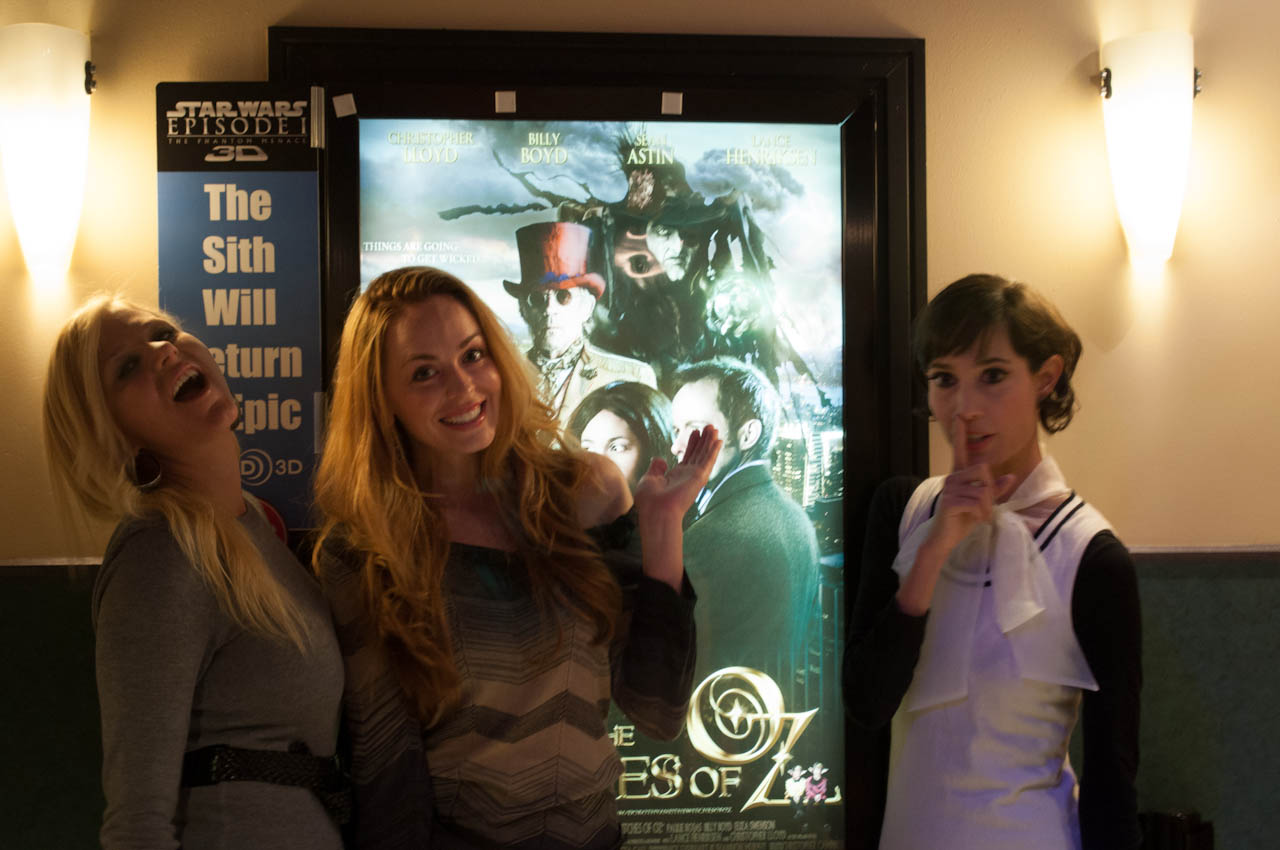
- Swenson (center) with Noel Thurman (left) and Paulie Rojas
- Born: July 28, 1982 (age 43); Quincy, California, United States
- Occupations: Actress; Musician; Singer; Composer

Eliza Swenson is an American actress, producer, singer, and composer. She was born on July 28, 1982, in Quincy, California. She has five siblings and is the youngest of them. She received a Bachelor of Fine Arts in Music Media and Sound Engineering from Brigham Young University in 2003.

She is known for producing, editing, co-writing, composing, and starring in the 2012 feature film Dorothy and the Witches of Oz. Under the pseudonym Victoria Mazze, Swenson is lead singer of the band The Divine Madness. On July 26, 2015, she married Jason Tibor Farkas. She has no children.

== Filmography ==
=== Television ===
- Drake & Josh (1 episode, 2007) as Vilga

=== Film ===
- Frankenstein Reborn (2005) as Elizabeth Weatherly
- The Beast of Bray Road (2005) as Tami
- King of the Lost World (2005) as Gloria
- Satanic (2006) as Dalia
- Bram Stoker's Dracula's Curse (2006) as Gracie Johannsen
- Candy Stripers (2006) as Sally
- The 9/11 Commission Report (2006) as Rosalind
- Pocahauntus (2006) as Destiny Moonbeam
- Dragon (2006) as Freyja
- Transmorphers (2007) as General Van Ryberg
- Pineapple (2008) as Crystal
- Chrome Angels (2009) as Layla
- Drop Dead Gorgeous (2010) as Sateya
- Dorothy and the Witches of Oz (2012) as Billie Westbrook
- Legend of the Red Reaper (2012) as The Teller Witch
- The Penny Dreadful Picture Show (2013) as Penny Dreadful
- Alice D (2014) as Krista
- The Lost Girls (2015) as Gracie

=== Composer ===
- Exorcism: The Possession of Gail Bowers (2006)
- Bram Stoker's Dracula's Curse (2006)
- The 9/11 Commission Report (2006)
- Dragon (2006)
- Supercroc (2007)
- Transmorphers (2007) as Victoria Mazze
- The Dunwich Horror (2009)
- Dorothy and the Witches of Oz (2012)
- The Penny Dreadful Picture Show (2013)
- The Lost Girls (2015)
