= The Butcher (2006 film) =

- DVD release poster
- Directed by: Edward Gorsuch
- Written by: Michael Hurst
- Starring: Myiea Coy; Hazel Dean; Ashley Rebecca Hawkins
- Production company: Lionsgate
- Distributed by: Lionsgate
- Release date: 2006
- Running time: 90 minutes
- Country: United States
- Language: English

The Butcher is a 2006 horror film directed by Edward Gorsuch. It centers on a group of teenagers who discover a murderer living in the middle of nowhere after crashing their car.

== Plot ==
Six college friends embark on a road trip to Las Vegas, and during a foolish and unfamiliar shortcut, become involved in a serious car accident in a small, unknown town. One of the girls in the vehicle dies, and is accompanied by a friend while the others go looking for help in the small town. They find an old house in the woods, which is inhabited by a family of psychopaths, who proceed to chase and hunt down the group of kids.

== Cast ==
- Catherine Wreford as Rachel
- Tom Nagel as Adam
- Myiea Coy as Sophie
- Alan Ritchson as Mark
- Ashley Hawkins as Atlanta
- Tiffany Kristensen as Liz
- Annie MacKay as Angel
  - Conner Gorsuch as Little Angel
- Bill Jacobson as Franklin Mayhew
- Hazell Dean as Sarah
- April Lang as Mrs. Mayhew
- Nick Stellate as Sheriff
- Pej Vahdat as Chip
- April Gilbert as Sarah

== Reception ==
Mitchell Hattaway, writing for DVD Verdict, gave the film a negative review. He said that "The Butcher was shot on cheap digital videotape, and the disc's transfer is flat, dull, and noisy. There is little channel separation in the stereo soundtrack, and dialogue sounds tinny and canned. An assortment of previews is the only bonus feature. I would be remiss if I didn't give the filmmakers props for their one original idea: I'm pretty sure this is the only movie in the history of cinema in which a character is killed by being drowned in a bathtub filled with strawberry Nestlé's Quik. Eat your heart out, Mr. Hitchcock." HorrorTalk wrote that "Right off the bat, The Butcher is going to be a love-it or hate-it film for most, due to the fact that its sole purpose of being nothing more than a torture horror film at its most basic level." DreadCentral wrote that: "Originally entitled The Harvest, Lionsgate realized that was just too generic and changed it to the almost nearly as generic The Butcher. Considering the film doesn't seem to have an original idea in its body or any intention of even trying to come up with an original idea or the ability to do anything even remotely creative with its recycled material, a more fitting title would have been The Nevada Wrong Turn Massacre."
