= Denise Richards: It's Complicated =

2008 American reality TV series

- Genre: Reality
- Starring: Denise Richards; Lola Rose Sheen; Sam Sheen; Michelle McLaughlin; Irv Richards; Shoichi Shingu
- Narrated by: Denise Richards
- Country of origin: United States
- Original language: English
- No. of seasons: 2
- No. of episodes: 17

Production
- Executive producers: Ryan Seacrest; Kevin Lee
- Production locations: Los Angeles, California
- Camera setup: Single camera
- Running time: 22 min approx
- Production companies: Ryan Seacrest Productions; TollBooth TV

Original release
- Network: E!
- Release: May 26, 2008 – July 26, 2009

Related
- Denise Richards & Her Wild Things

Denise Richards: It's Complicated is an American reality-based television series that aired on E! from May 26, 2008 to July 26, 2009. It is the second series to be produced by Ryan Seacrest Productions, following Keeping Up with the Kardashians. The program details the daily lives of actress Denise Richards, her daughters Sam and Lola, and her family (her married younger sister Michelle and father Irv), as she deals with her career and the publicity she had received since her divorce from actor Charlie Sheen.

== Overview ==
=== Season 1 ===
When Richards announced her plans to do a reality show in 2007, she received a lot of negative press coverage, mostly due to objections over the use of her children in the series and overhyped publicity she has done in promoting the show prior to its debut. Richards was hoping that by doing the series that she would be able to show her side of the story.

In January 2008, Richards decided to include her two daughters with Charlie Sheen in the show, but Sheen deemed her plans "greedy, vain and exploitative". On January 25, 2008, Richards won a court case against Sheen so that she can include her daughters in the show. When a judge rejected Sheen's request to block it, the latter urged fans to boycott it.

An agreement was reached between Charlie Sheen and Denise Richards regarding the custody of the children.

=== Season 2 ===
Rumors spread in late August 2008 that the show was canceled due to declining ratings throughout the season. However, a rep for E! denied that the show was canceled and said decisions about a second season were still being made, "The show has not been canceled--The series has performed well for the network and decisions are still being made regarding a second season." Richards confirmed to usmagazine.com September 17, 2008 that the show was renewed for another season and starts filming "in a few months." Filming of the second and final season began in January 2009. The second and final season premiere was the highest ratings for "Denise Richards: It's Complicated" with 1.5 million viewers.

== Episodes ==
=== Series overview ===
Season	Episodes	Originally released	
Season	Episodes	First released	Last released
1	9	May 26, 2008	July 27, 2008
2	8	June 7, 2009	July 26, 2009

=== Season 1 (2008) ===
No. overall	No. in season	Title	Original release date
1	1	"Denise Dating"	May 26, 2008
Denise goes to the DMV to change her last name from Sheen back to Richards; she arranges to find a stud pig to breed her female; and agrees to go on a blind date with a normal guy.
2	2	"Denise vs. Tabloids"	June 1, 2008
Denise has a face-to-face interview with a tabloid journalist to tell why she's doing a reality show; She decides to stop swearing for her kids, and if she does swear, will donate shoes to charity. She also sits down for an interview with Redbook. Beginning with this episode, the series moved to its normal Sunday night timeslot.
3	3	"No Jackets Required"	June 8, 2008
Denise considers posing for Playboy, while everybody tries to talk her out of it; prepares for her meeting with Joel Silver and gets her father a makeover, before they attend a red carpet event.
4	4	"Desperate House Mom"	June 15, 2008
Denise looks to find some equal time to have some fun while taking care of her children; also handles a conflict between Sho and Sabrina.
5	5	"Saying Goodbye"	June 22, 2008
Denise tries to come to terms with the death of her mother; and tries to conquer her insomnia.
6	6	"A Weekend in the Country"	June 29, 2008
Denise visits her family, and later babysits her nephew and his teenage friends.
7	7	"Bikini Shape"	July 13, 2008
Denise tries to lose weight before her vacation to Hawaii. She also deals with her father not liking all of the pets she has, as he threatens to send them to a kennel while she is on vacation.
8	8	"Hawaii: Searching for Youth"	July 20, 2008
Denise vacations in Hawaii with her sister and friends. She gets angry, however, when paparazzi follow their every move.
9	9	"Denise Strikes Back!"	July 27, 2008
Denise travels to New York City to promote her show. She ends up disappointed with how the promotion goes as everyone asks about her personal life and putting her children on TV. In the end, she fights back and appreciates her family even more.

=== Season 2 (2009) ===
No. overall	No. in season	Title	Original release date
10	1	"Vegas, Baby"	June 7, 2009
Denise must overcome her fear of drunk, unruly crowds, plus deal with a last minute fashion emergency, and a father ready to party - all before she can ring in the new year.
11	2	"Denise Does Slamdance"	June 14, 2009
When Denise's film, "Finding Bliss," is accepted into the prestigious Slamdance Film Festival, she heads to Park City, Utah, with her best friend Kim, and assistant, Chrissy.
12	3	"Dating-ish"	June 21, 2009
What starts out as a casual Valentine's Day group dinner gets surprisingly dramatic for Denise and her family.
13	4	"Labor of Love"	June 28, 2009
When her friend Trish gives birth, Denise is unable to make it to the hospital in time, as she is in a Broken Lizard comedy.
14	5	"Funbags or Die"	July 5, 2009
When Will Ferrell's website Funny or Die asks Denise to star in a comedy video about her "fun bags," she is excited to make fun of her assets.
15	6	"Dancing with Denise"	July 12, 2009
This episode takes us inside the emotional and physical rollercoaster of Dancing with the Stars.
16	7	"Picture Imperfect"	July 19, 2009
Denise volunteers to be in a new print campaign for Kim's cosmetic line, Primp.
17	8	"Root for the Home Team"	July 26, 2009
In memory of her mom, Denise hosts a fundraiser for the Kidney Cancer Foundation at Wrigley Field in Chicago.

== Critical reception ==
Along with another E! reality-based series that debuted the same day, Living Lohan, Denise Richards: It's Complicated also received negative reviews.

In one review, "Variety" summed it up this way: "She's traded on her sexuality to become one of those public figures who cavorts with other public figures, and we (or, at least, those of us inclined to watch and read about such fluff) are voyeurs."

The series has also generated mixed comments from Entertainment Weekly, which gave the series a D. In its review, Gillian Flynn notes, "It's Complicated is one of those celebs, they're just like us! shows in which we're expected to enjoy watching a famous pampered person doing things we don't want to do either.

The series also got a D from the Boston Herald, who summed it up after critic Mark A. Perigard watched the first episode: "Denise Richards' life is one steaming pile of pig poop...Literally."

The Palm Beach Post's review of the series turned off the reviewer after critic Kevin Thompson saw the first episode: "E! is calling the new show Denise Richards: It's Complicated. I'd suggest a name change: Denise Richards: It's Boring."

In a review from Slate, they thought that first episode hit their stride too fast: "The most significant problem with the premiere episode...is that it hits its peak too early."

The Los Angeles Times compared both Richards and Lohan's shows and came to the conclusion that both shows had some flaws: "When we tune into shows like "Living Lohan" and "It's Complicated," we come because we're curious, eager to admire, perhaps to envy, certainly to judge. Those manor houses were lovely, but they were often cold and impersonal, the furnishings too fussy to be of use, and who would want the burden of maintaining such a life? Dina Lohan may be able to get her daughter a recording session in Las Vegas, Denise Richards can afford a $9,000 grill or whistle up an instant-tan house call, but would we really want to be either of them? Lord, let's hope not."

== DVD releases ==
Season 1 was released on DVD in Australia on May 2, 2009 by Shock Records.
