= Ken Foree =

American actor

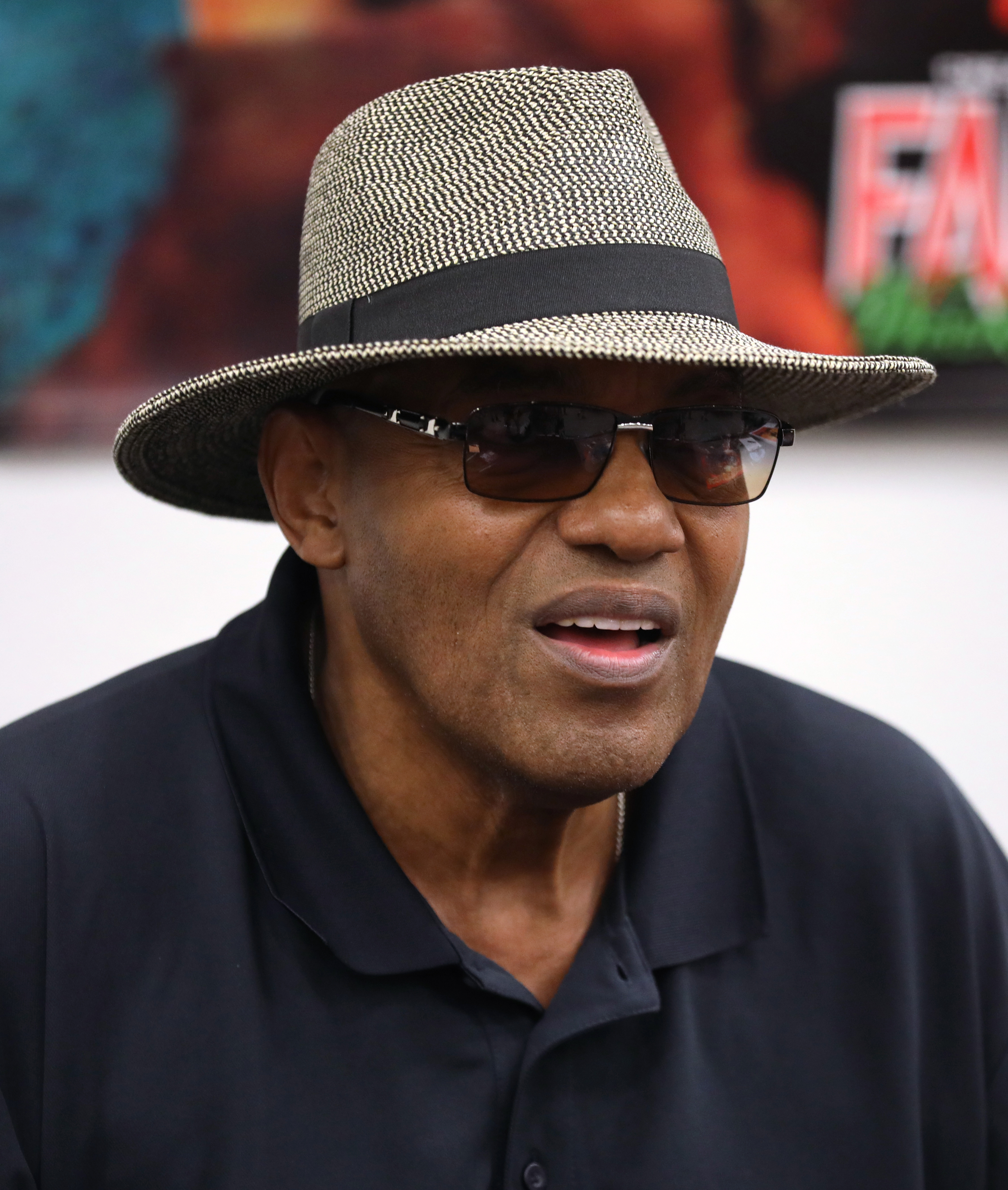
- Foree in 2024
- Born: Kentotis Alvin Foree; February 29, 1948 (age 78); Indianapolis, Indiana, U.S.
- Occupation: Actor
- Years active: 1976–present
- Website: kenforee.com

Kentotis Alvin Foree (born February 29, 1948) is an American actor, best known as the protagonist Peter from the horror film Dawn of the Dead (1978), Roger Rockmore on the Nickelodeon television sitcom Kenan & Kel (1996–2000), and Joe Grizzly from the horror film Halloween (2007).

== Early life ==
Kentotis Alvin Foree was born on February 29, 1948, in Indianapolis, Indiana, the oldest of four boys. Foree also had an older half sister. Foree lived in Lockefield Gardens and attended Catholic school. Before becoming an actor, Foree was a photographer and played for the farm team of the New York Knicks, having been spotted by Dick Barnett.

== Career ==
Foree first got into acting after his photography studio was robbed.

Foree began acting in the 1970s, appearing in films such as The Bingo Long Traveling All-Stars & Motor Kings (1976), Dawn of the Dead (1978), The Wanderers (1979), and Leatherface: The Texas Chainsaw Massacre III (1990). Foree's role in The Bingo had resulted from him acting in a play with Marlene Warfield, where John Badman and Rob Cohen recruited him. He also had roles in the films Knightriders (1981), From Beyond (1986), and The Dentist (1996). In 1995, he starred in an episode of The X-Files as well as the GROPOS episode of Babylon 5. Foree also played Roger Rockmore, Kenan and Kyra's father on the Nickelodeon sitcom Kenan & Kel. In 2005, he played Charlie Altamont in the film The Devil's Rejects, starring opposite Sid Haig and Bill Moseley as the adopted brother of Haig's character. In 2007, he appeared in Rob Zombie's remake of the 1978 film Halloween.

Ken Foree appeared as himself in the 2008 novel Bad Moon Rising by Jonathan Maberry. Foree is one of several real-world horror celebrities who are in the fictional town of Pine Deep when monsters attack. Other celebrities include Tom Savini, Jim O'Rear, Brinke Stevens, James Gunn, Stephen Susco, Debbie Rochon, Joe Bob Briggs, and Mem Shannon.

== Filmography ==
=== Film ===
Year	Film	Role	Notes
1976	The Bingo Long Traveling All-Stars & Motor Kings	"Honey", Potter's Goon	
1978	Dawn of the Dead	Peter Washington	
1979	The Wanderers	Black Sportsman	
1979	The Fish That Saved Pittsburgh	Pittsburgh Python Player	Uncredited
1980	The Golden Moment: An Olympic Love Story	Unknown	
1981	Terror Among Us	Prisoner	TV movie
1981	Elvis and the Beauty Queen	Boxer	TV movie
1981	Knightriders	John "Little John"	
1981	Born to Be Sold	Man	TV movie
1986	From Beyond	Buford "Bubba" Brownlee	
1986	Jo Jo Dancer, Your Life Is Calling	"Big Joke"	
1987	Terror Squad	Deputy Brown	
1989	True Blood	Detective Charlie Gates	
1989	Phantom of the Mall: Eric's Revenge	Acardi	
1989	Death Spa	Marvin	
1990	Leatherface: The Texas Chainsaw Massacre III	Benny	
1990	Taking Care of Business	J.B., Prisoner Making Demands	
1990	Without You I'm Nothing	Emcee (M.C.)	
1990	Down the Drain	Buckley	
1991	Night of the Warrior	Oliver	
1991	Diplomatic Immunity	Del Roy Gaines	
1991	Hangfire	Billy	
1991	The Heroes of Desert Storm	Sergeant Leroy Ford	
1992	Final Shot: The Hank Gathers Story	First USC Coach	
1993	Joshua Tree	Eddie Turner	
1996	The Dentist	Detective Gibbs	
2004	Dawn of the Dead	The Televangelist	
2005	The Devil's Rejects	Charlie Altamont	
2006	Devil's Den	Leonard	
2007	Halloween	Joe "Big Joe" Grizzly	
2007	Black Santa's Revenge	Black Santa	Short film
2007	Brutal Massacre: A Comedy	Carl Perkins	
2007	Brotherhood of Blood	Stanis	
2008	Dead Bones	The Bartender	
2008	Cut, Print	Jack Stanley	Orlando Entertainment
2009	Zone of the Dead	CIA Agent Mortimer "Morty" Reyes	
2009	Live Evil	Max	
2011	Water for Elephants	Earl	
2012	The Lords of Salem	Herman "Munster" Jackson	
2012	Cut/Print	Detective Jack Stanley	
2015	The Divine Tragedies	Homer	
2016	The Rift	John Smith	
2017	The Midnight Man	Hamilton	
2019	Horror Noire: A History of Black Horror	Himself	Documentary
2020	John Henry	B.J. Henry	

=== Television ===
Year	Film	Role	Episode(s)
1977	Kojak	T.J. Smith	"The Condemned"
1980	A Rumor of War	The M.P.	Miniseries
1981	The Dukes of Hazzard	Rollo	"State of the County"
1981–1982	Hill Street Blues	Bubba Edwards / Holdup Guy With Shotgun	2 episodes
1982	Report to Murphy	Walter "Big Walter"	3 episodes
1982	Tales of the Gold Monkey	Hugo	"Shanghaied"
1983	T.J. Hooker	The Bartender	"Lady in Blue"
1983	Remington Steele	Herschel "The Hammer" Sinclair	"Steele Knuckles and Glass Jaws"
1984	The A-Team	Dirkson	"Chopping Spree"
1984	Benson	The Driver	"The Little Hotel That Could"
1984	Blue Thunder	Alfie	"The Island"
1984	Santa Barbara	Helicopter Pilot	Episode #1.24
1984	Riptide	Maritime Patrole Front Desk Officer	"Catch of the Day"
1984	Knight Rider	Danton	"Knight in Disgrace"
1985	227	Marvin Grant	"Honesty"
1985	Hunter	Louis McMahon	"Guilty"
1985	Knight Rider	"Spider-Man"	"Redemption of a Champion"
1989	Beauty and the Beast	Morley	"A Kingdom by the Sea"
1990	Quantum Leap	"The Brush"	"Pool Hall Blues"
1990	Matlock	Billy Leon	"The Fighter"
1991	The Flash	"Whisper"	"Beat the Clock"
1992	General Hospital	Kris	Unknown episodes
1994	Renegade	Clint	"Hostage"
1994	Viper	Harley Trueblood	
1994	M.A.N.T.I.S.	Unknown	"Cease Fire"
1995	Babylon 5	P.F.C. Large	"Gropos"
1995	The X-Files	Vincent Parmelly	"The List"
1996	Due South	Macon Lacroix	"The Edge"
1996–2000	Kenan and Kel	Roger Rockmore	60 episodes
1999	The Angry Beavers	The Voice	"Brothers... to the End?"
2001	The Nightmare Room	Coach	"Locker 13"
2008	30 Days of Night: Dust to Dust	Nate Keller	Miniseries
2017	Dimension 404	Agent X	"Polybius"

=== Video ===
Year	Film	Role
1990	Fatal Charm	Willy
1995	Sleepstalker	Detective Rolands
2007	Splatter Disco	Shank Chubb
2009	The Haunted World of El Superbeasto	Luke St. Luke (voice)
2010	D.C. Sniper	John Allen Muhammad

=== Videogames ===
Year	Title	Role
2004	Grand Theft Auto: San Andreas	Pedestrian
2026	Halloween: The Game	Midnight Kingston Pearl
