= The Devil's Rejects (soundtrack) =

2005 soundtrack by various artists

- DualDisc cover

Soundtrack album to the film The Devil's Rejects by Various Artists
- Released: June 28, 2005
- Recorded: Various
- Genre: Rock
- Length: 64:41
- Label: Hip-O Records
- Producer: Rob Zombie

Alternative cover
- CD cover

Professional ratings
Review scores
Source	Rating
Allmusic	3.5/5 stars
Empire	3/5 stars

The Devil's Rejects is the soundtrack for Rob Zombie's film The Devil's Rejects. It was released as a standard CD and as a DualDisc. While both feature the same songs, the DualDisc also includes sound clips from the film, as well as including the album in high-resolution stereo, a behind-the-scenes documentary about the film and a photogallery on the DVD side.

== Track listing ==
Note that all sound clips are only included on the DualDisc, not the CD

1. Sound clip: "You Ain't Getting Me" – 0:18
2. "Midnight Rider" – Allman Brothers Band – 2:55
3. Sound clip: "I Call 'Em Like I See 'Em" – 0:26
4. "Shambala" – Three Dog Night – 3:20
5. Sound clip: "Find a New Angle" – 0:19
6. "Brave Awakening" – Terry Reid – 6:19
7. Sound clip: "It's Just So Depressing" – 0:35
8. "It Wasn't God Who Made Honky Tonk Angels" – Kitty Wells – 2:27
9. Sound clip: "Would You Say That Again" – 0:21
10. "Satan's Got to Get Along Without Me" – Buck Owens & His Buckaroos – 1:59
11. Sound clip: "This Is Insane" – 0:10
12. "Fooled Around and Fell in Love" – Elvin Bishop – 4:34
13. Sound clip: "Chinese, Japanese" – 0:19
14. "I Can't Quit You Baby" – Otis Rush – 3:04
15. Sound clip: "Top Secret Clown Business" – 0:19
16. "Funk #49" – James Gang – 3:52
17. Sound clip: "Have Fun Scrapping Them Brains" – 0:07
18. "Rock On" – David Essex – 3:24
19. Sound clip: "Tutti Fruity" – 0:25
20. "Rocky Mountain Way" – Joe Walsh – 5:15
21. Sound clip: "What'd You Call Me?" – 0:11
22. "To Be Treated Rite" – Terry Reid – 5:51
23. Sound clip: "You Have Got It Made" – 0:17
24. "Free Bird" – Lynyrd Skynyrd – 9:05
25. Sound clip: "We've Always Been Devil Slayers" – 0:35
26. "Seed of Memory" – Terry Reid – 5:19
27. Sound clip: "Banjo & Sullivan Radio Spot #1" – 0:09
28. "I'm At Home Getting Hammered (While She's Out Getting Nailed)" – Banjo & Sullivan – 2:40
29. Sound clip: "Banjo & Sullivan Radio Spot #2" – 0:06

== Chart positions ==
Album – Billboard (North America)

Year	Chart	Position
2005	The Billboard 200	156
2005	Top Soundtracks	9

== Release ==
In 2019, Zombie announced that Waxwork Records would release the soundtrack on vinyl. The record included an essay written by director Rob Zombie and a 12x12" booklet that contained behind the scenes photographs.

== See also ==
- Rob Zombie discography
