= Robert Mukes =

American actor

Robert Allen Mukes
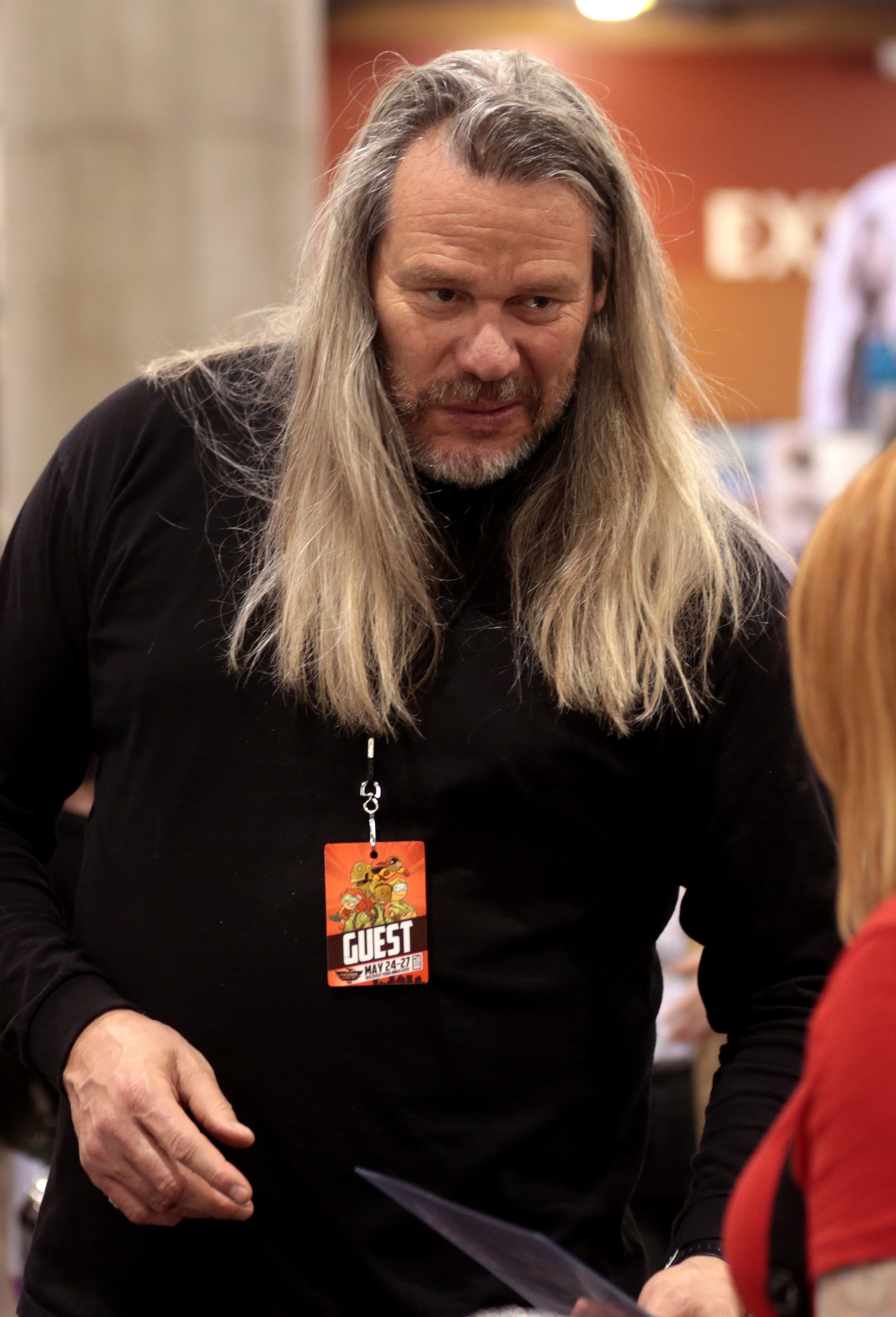
- Mukes in 2018
- Born: March 14, 1964 (age 62); Indianapolis, Indiana, U.S.
- Other name: Robert "Bonecrusher" Mukes
- Occupation: Actor
- Years active: 1997–present
- Height: 2.08 m (6 ft 10 in)
- Website: http://www.robertmukes.com

Robert Allen Mukes (born March 14, 1964) is an American actor living in Los Angeles.

== Career ==
Sometimes credited as Robert "Bonecrusher" Mukes, Mukes played professional basketball in Europe until age 30, then trained for pro-wrestling. His time in that career field was cut short due to injuries.

The 6' 10" actor is best known for his role as Rufus "R.J." Firefly, Jr. in House of 1000 Corpses, a role he did not reprise in the sequel The Devil's Rejects. Mukes is also known for his role as eskimo bounty hunter Abumchuck in the TV series Weeds and his work on HBO's TV series, Westworld.

Mukes attends fan conventions as a celebrity guest, such as San Diego Comic Con, Monster-Mania Con, Scare-a-Con, Scarefest, Days of the Dead, and Rock & Shock.

== Filmography ==
=== Film ===
Year	Title	Role	Notes
1998	MP da Last Don	Bodyguard #2	
2000	Sinbad: Beyond the Veil of Mists	King's guard and Executioner	
2001	Forbidden Highway	Tiny	
2002	Black Mask 2: City of Masks	Snake	
2003	House of 1000 Corpses	Rufus	
2008	Drillbit Taylor	Bodyguard	
2012	Slumber Party Slaughter	Gardener	
2015	Bone Tomahawk	Sentinel	
2017	Coffin 2	Buddy	
2018	Last American Horror Show	The Butcher	
2018	Valentine DayZ	Dark Eyes	
2018	Alpha Wolf	John Carradine	
2021	Death Park: The End	Body Snatcher / Cleaner	
2021	Hell of the Screaming Undead	Warren	
2021	Appetite for Sin	Johnny Coughin	
2022	Evil at the Door	The Cleaner	
2024	Spider Baby, or The Maddest Story Ever Told	The Storyteller	
2026	Last Chance Motel	Monster	

=== Television ===
Year	Title	Role	Notes
1997	Men Behaving Badly	Benjamin	Episode: "No Retreat, No Surrender"
1998	The Parent 'Hood	Doorman	Episode: "A Sister Scorned"
1998	Sliders	Security Guard	Episode: "Lipschitz Live!"
1998, 2000	The Brian Benben Show	Athlete / Rabbi	2 episodes
2000	Choppy	Suspect	Television film
2001	Dharma & Greg	Man	Episode: "How This Happened"
2001	Nikki	Tex-asaurus Rex	Episode: "My Best Friend's Day Care"
2002	She Spies	Mac	Episode: "Daddy's Girl"
2003	Fastlane	Bouncer	Episode: "Strap On"
2004	Las Vegas	Hulking Cajun Brother #1	Episode: "New Orleans"
2004	CSI: Crime Scene Investigation	Inmate	Episode: "No Humans Involved"
2005	Rodney	Eddie G	Episode: "The Ring"
2005	The Fallen Ones	Aramis	Television film
2006–2007	Weeds	Abumchuk	4 episodes
2007	Veronica Mars	Imposing Guy	Episode: "Poughkeepsie, Tramps and Thieves"
2008	Backwoods	Josiah	Television film
2008	SIS	The Samoan	Television film
2010	Fake It Til You Make It	Big Swerve	Episode: "Dine and Ditch"
2012	Criminal Minds	Male Visitor	Episode: "Heathridge Manor"
2012	Person of Interest	Titus	Episode: "The Contingency"
2013	The Mindy Project	Big Meat	Episode: "Mindy Lahiri Is a Racist"
2015	Justified	Cell Mate	Episode: "Fugitive Number One"
2015	Party Monsters	Frankie	Television film
2016	Westworld	Behemoth	Episode: "Trace Decay"
2017	NCIS: Los Angeles	Tiny	Episode: "Under Siege"
2017	School of Rock	Metal Dude	Episode: "Leader of the Band"
2021	Malvolia: The Queen of Screams	The Dark Lord	Episode: "Thankskilling: The Guest"

=== Video games ===
Year	Title	Role	Notes
2023	The Texas Chain Saw Massacre	Hands	
