= House of 1000 Corpses =

2003 American comedy horror film by Rob Zombie

- Theatrical release poster
- Directed by: Rob Zombie
- Written by: Rob Zombie
- Produced by: Andy Gould
- Starring: Sid Haig; Bill Moseley; Sheri Moon; Karen Black
- Cinematography: Alex Poppas; Tom Richmond
- Edited by: Kathryn Himoff; Robert K. Lambert; Sean K. Lambert
- Music by: Rob Zombie; Scott Humphrey
- Production companies: Spectacle Entertainment; Universal Pictures
- Distributed by: Lions Gate Films
- Release dates: March 13, 2003 (Mar del Plata Film Festival); April 11, 2003 (United States)
- Running time: 89 minutes
- Country: United States
- Language: English
- Budget: $7 million
- Box office: $16.8 million

House of 1000 Corpses is a 2003 American black comedy horror film written, co-scored, and directed by Rob Zombie in his directorial debut, and starring Sid Haig, Bill Moseley, Sheri Moon, Karen Black, Rainn Wilson, Chris Hardwick, Tom Towles, Erin Daniels, Jennifer Jostyn, Walton Goggins, and Dennis Fimple in his final role. The plot centers on a group of four young adults who are kidnapped and tortured by a psychopathic family during Halloween 1977 while traveling across the country researching a book on roadside attractions.

Inspired by 1970s horror films such as The Texas Chain Saw Massacre (1974) and The Hills Have Eyes (1977), Zombie conceived the film while designing a haunted house attraction for Universal Studios Hollywood, where filming took place in 2000 on the backlots and in Valencia, California.

When Universal Pictures shelved the film after it received an NC-17 rating, Zombie reacquired the rights. They were eventually sold to Lions Gate Films, who recut the film and released it on April 11, 2003. Despite receiving an unfavorable response from critics, it went on to gross $16 million worldwide. Since its release, the film has achieved a cult following, was developed into a haunted house attraction by Zombie for Universal Studios, and was followed by two sequels forming the Firefly trilogy: The Devil's Rejects (2005) and 3 from Hell (2019).

== Plot ==
On October 30, 1977, amateur criminals Karl and Richard Wick attempt an armed robbery at a gas station/horror museum, but are killed by the owner, Captain Spaulding, and his assistant, Ravelli. Later that night, Jerry Goldsmith, Bill Hudley, Mary Knowles, and Denise Willis are on the road in hopes of writing a book on offbeat roadside attractions. When the four meet Spaulding, who is also the owner of "The Museum of Monsters & Madmen", they learn of the local legend of "Dr. Satan", a mad scientist who tried to create a new species using mental patients. As they take off in search of the tree from which Dr. Satan was hanged, they pick up a young free-spirited hitchhiker named Baby, who claims to live only a few miles away. Shortly after, a mysterious figure appears hidden in some overgrowth and shoots out their vehicle's tire with a shotgun. The group thinks it is just a blown out tire and so Baby takes Bill to her family's house to get a tow truck. Moments later, Baby's half-brother, Rufus, picks up the stranded passengers and takes them to the family home.

There, they meet Baby's family: her adopted brother Otis Driftwood, her deformed giant half-brother Tiny, Mother Firefly, and Grandpa Hugo. While being treated to dinner, Mother Firefly explains that her ex-husband, Earl, had previously tried to burn Tiny alive, along with the Firefly house after he suffered a psychotic breakdown. After dinner, the family puts on a Halloween show for their guests and Baby offends Mary by flirting with Bill. After Mary threatens Baby, Rufus tells them their car is repaired. As the couples leave, Otis and Tiny, disguised as scarecrows, attack them in the driveway and take them captive. The next day, Otis kills Bill and mutilates his body, turning him into a Fiji Mermaid. Mary is tied up in a room and tormented by Otis, Denise is tied to a bed dressed up as a doll for Halloween, and Jerry is partially scalped for failing to guess Baby's favorite movie star.

When Denise does not come home, her father Don calls the police to report her missing. Two deputies, George Wydell and Steve Naish, find the couples' abandoned car in a field with a dead, mutilated cheerleader in the trunk (one of five cheerleaders who went missing over a week ago, as explained in a news broadcast; an earlier scene established that the cheerleaders were being tortured, raped and killed by the Firefly family). Don, a former policeman, is called to the scene to help the deputies search. They arrive at the Firefly house and Wydell questions Mother Firefly about the missing teens. Mother Firefly shoots Wydell in the head and kills him; Don and Steve are then killed by Otis when they find more bodies of missing cheerleaders in the barn, along with a barely conscious Mary.

Later that night, Mary, Denise, and Jerry are dressed as rabbits and taken out to an abandoned well. Otis torments Denise using the skin of her dead father's face as a mask. Mary attempts to run away, but is tracked down and stabbed to death by Baby moments later. Otis and the family burn the bodies on a pyre.

Meanwhile, Jerry and Denise are placed in a coffin and lowered into a well, where a group of Dr. Satan's failed experiments break open the coffin and pull Jerry away, leaving Denise to find her way through labyrinthine catacombs. As she wanders through tunnels filled with mutilated corpses, she encounters Dr. Satan and a number of mental patients. She discovers Jerry on Dr. Satan's operating table being vivisected. Dr. Satan orders his mutated gargantuan assistant, who turns out to be Mother Firefly's ex-husband Earl, to capture Denise, but Denise outwits him and escapes by crawling to the surface as Earl is crushed by falling debris in the collapsing tunnel.

Denise makes her way to the main road where she encounters Captain Spaulding, who gives her a ride in his car. She passes out from exhaustion in the front seat, and Otis suddenly appears in the back seat with a knife. Denise later wakes up to find herself strapped to an operating table, surrounded by Dr. Satan and Earl, who survived the cave-in. The movie ends with Denise screaming in horror and the words "The End?" displayed before the end credits.

== Cast ==
- Sid Haig as Captain Spaulding
- Bill Moseley as Otis Driftwood
- Sheri Moon as Baby Firefly
- Karen Black as Mother Firefly
- Chris Hardwick as Jerry Goldsmith
- Erin Daniels as Denise Willis
- Jennifer Jostyn as Mary Knowles
- Rainn Wilson as Bill Hudley
- Walton Goggins as Deputy Steve Naish
- Tom Towles as Lt. George Wydell
- Matthew McGrory as Tiny Firefly
- Robert Allen Mukes as Rufus Firefly
- Dennis Fimple as Grandpa Hugo
- Harrison Young as Don Willis
- William Bassett as Sheriff Frank Huston
- Irwin Keyes as Ravelli
- Michael Pollard as Stucky

Chad Bannon and David Reynolds also appear as amateur robbers Killer Karl and Richard Wick. Walter Phelan portrays Dr. Satan. Earl Firefly, referred to in the credits as "The Professor", is portrayed by Jake McKinnon. Jeanne Carmen portrayed Miss Bunny, a dead animal puppeteer, but her scenes were eliminated from the final cut.

== Production ==
=== Development ===
Rob Zombie, the frontman of White Zombie and later a solo musician, had worked on animation for Beavis and Butt-Head Do America (1996), directed music videos, and completed a full screenplay for The Crow: 2037, but was unsuccessful getting it greenlit with himself as director. In 1999, Zombie designed a haunted maze attraction at Universal Studios that was instrumental in reviving the studio's annual Halloween Horror Nights and for which Bill Moseley presented Zombie an award. The studio later began working on an animated Frankenstein film which Zombie hoped to be involved with, though plans for the film were ultimately scrapped by the studio.

Inspired by horror films such as The Texas Chain Saw Massacre (1974) and The Hills Have Eyes (1977), Zombie began developing the story for House of 1000 Corpses while designing a haunted house attraction with that title for Universal. In 1999, MTV News announced Madonna was considering producing a horror film Zombie would write and direct called The Legend of the 13 Graves, which would center on "a group of road-trippers traveling through America who wind up encountering a suitably sick and twisted family." The film would have been co-produced by Madonna and her partner, Guy Oseary, through Madguy Films.

Universal responded positively to Zombie's pitch. Zombie later stated, "I was in the office of the head of production or something and he asked me if I had any movie ideas and I pitched him Corpses, which was very rough at the time, because I wasn't ready and I made it up on the spot. He liked it, I went home, wrote a 12-page treatment and met up with them. Two months later, we were shooting."

=== Casting ===
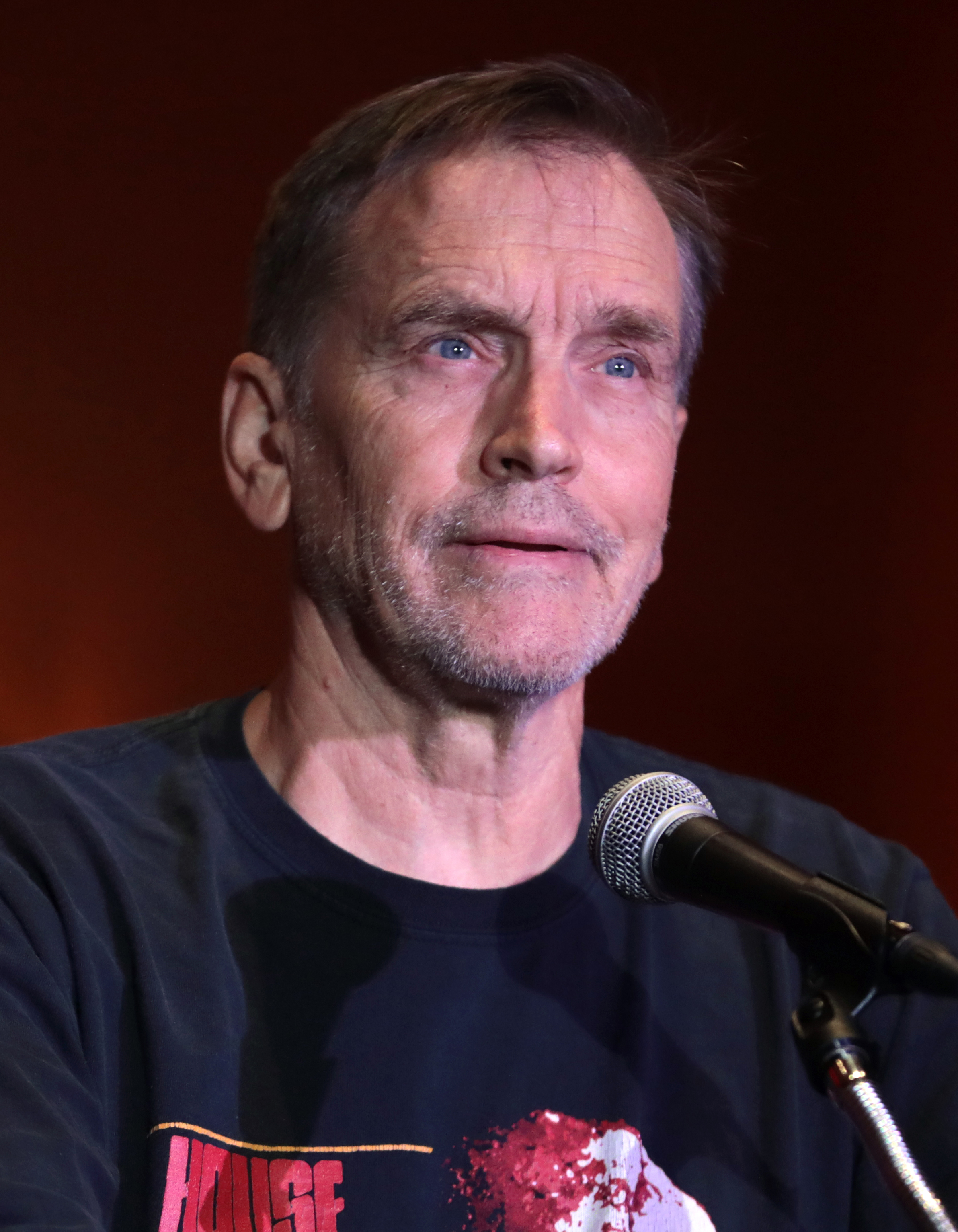
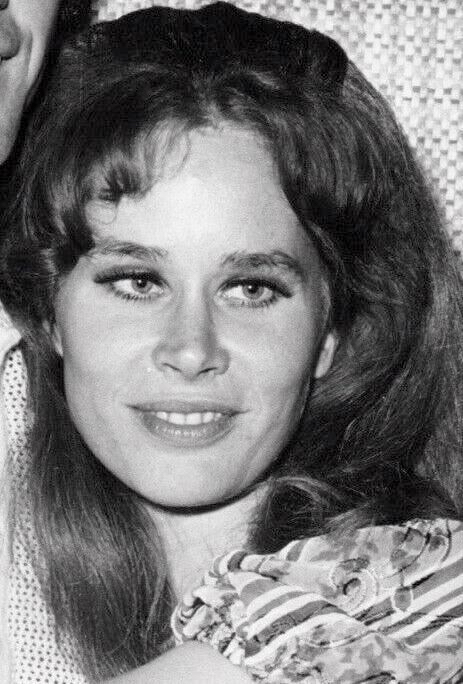
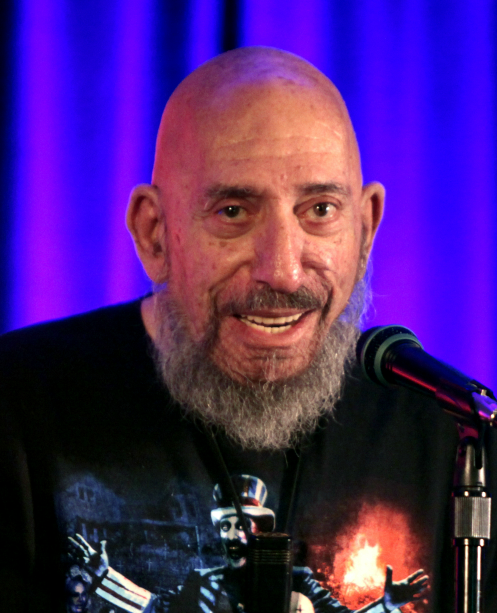
Bill Moseley (left), Karen Black (center), and Sid Haig (right) received praise from film critics for their roles in the film.

Sid Haig was cast as Captain Spaulding, a man who dresses as a clown and owns a gas station and museum of curiosities. Haig claimed he had to "get in touch with [his] own insanity" for the role. His relation to the Firefly family is not revealed in the film, though he is working with them to some extent; however, the sequel establishes that he is the father of Baby. Bill Moseley starred as Otis B. Driftwood, who was adopted into the Firefly family. Sheri Moon Zombie portrayed Baby Firefly, who became known for her high pitched laugh and sexual nature. Karen Black was cast as Mother Firefly, the protective mother to the family. Matthew McGrory portrayed Tiny Firefly, a tall man who was left deformed after a house fire started by his father. Robert Allen Mukes portrayed Rufus "RJ" Firefly Jr. Dennis Fimple was selected to play Grampa Hugo Firefly. He died following filming, and the finished product was dedicated to his memory.

The names of members of the Firefly family were taken from the names of Groucho Marx characters. Captain Spaulding was a character in Animal Crackers (1930), Otis B. Driftwood was a character in A Night at the Opera (1935), Rufus T. Firefly was taken from Duck Soup (1933), and lastly Hugo Z. Hackenbush derived from A Day at the Races (1937). Despite only allusions to this being made in House of 1000 Corpses, it is more prevalent in the film's sequel, with the names becoming integral to the plot. Zombie acknowledged that viewers were meant to "root for" the Firefly family as opposed to the group of teens, though claims it wasn't intentional: "Yeah, I wanted the audience to cheer 'em. I didn't consciously think of it at the time, because I was trying to make Bill and Jerry likeable. But it's like when you saw Beetlejuice and you could tell all Tim Burton cared about was Beetlejuice."

Erin Daniels portrayed Denise Willis. Chris Hardwick was cast as Jerry Goldsmith, a young man who was seen as "hyper" and "wise-cracking". The character Bill Hudley was portrayed by Rainn Wilson. House of 1000 Corpses served as one of Wilson's first films, though he found mainstream success following the film's release. Mary Knowles, Bill's girlfriend, was played by Jennifer Jostyn. Mary was seen as the most confrontational of the group, often clashing with Baby due to her flirtatious relationship with Bill. Harrison Young was selected to play Don Willis, the father of Denise who later goes looking for her and her group of friends. Tom Towles and Walton Goggins portrayed Lieutenant George Wydell and Deputy Steve Naish, respectively; the pair work with Don to find the missing group.

Irwin Keyes was cast as Ravelli, the assistant to Captain Spaulding who helps run the tourist attraction. Michael J. Pollard portrayed Stucky, a friend of Captain Spaulding and Ravelli's. Chad Bannon and David Reynolds played Killer Karl and Richard "Little Dick" Wick, two men who try to rob Captain Spaulding's shop and are murdered. William H. Basset had a small role in the film as Sheriff Frank Huston. Joe Dobbs III played Gerry Ober, a man who works at the liquor store; he is later given the nickname "Goober" by Baby. Gregg Gibbs appeared as Dr. Wolfenstein during the "murder ride". Zombie made a cameo appearance as Dr. Wolfenstein's assistant. Despite initially planning to appear as Dr. Wolfenstein, Zombie opted to be his assistant instead, believing he would look "normal" in costume. Walter Phelan was cast as Dr. Satan, whose real name was S. Quintin Quale.

Actress and pin-up model Jeanne Carmen had been cast in House of 1000 Corpses as Miss Bunny, a dead animal puppeteer. However, Carmen's character was ultimately cut from the film.

=== Filming ===
Production on House of 1000 Corpses began in May 2000 and was finished by Halloween that year. The film's starting budget was $3–4 million, though its final budget is debatable. Zombie first claimed that the film was made solely with the initial $4 million but later described a budget between $7 million and $14 million.

The film was shot on a 25-day shooting schedule. Two weeks were spent filming on the Universal Studios Hollywood backlots—the house featured in the film is the same house used in The Best Little Whorehouse in Texas (1982), and it can be seen on Universal Studios' tram tours. Zombie stated that filming on the lot was at times difficult, as the amusement park was often open and the ambient sound from visitors recurrently ruined takes. The remaining 11 days of the shoot were spent on a ranch in Valencia, California.

Scenes featuring Baby masturbating with a skeleton, along with other cutaway scenes, were filmed in Zombie's basement after initial filming for the project had concluded. Zombie later cited home recordings from the Manson family as inspiration for the Firefly family's "bizarre" rants. Zombie often filmed two versions of scenes, one of them less gory, in an attempt to please Universal.

Zombie claimed the film was not initially meant to feature elements of dark humor, saying it "turned out a little wackier and campier than I originally intended. But as we were shooting, that's the tone that it was turning out to be. Movies sometimes dictate their own course, so I just sort of went with it."

=== Post-production ===
==== Original lost cut ====
The original cut of House of 1000 Corpses featured a twist ending in which it was revealed that the legendary figure of Dr. Satan was in fact a ploy created by the Firefly family to lure passerby as victims to their home, with Grandpa Hugo posing as the mad doctor. The character of Dr. Satan was inspired by a 1950s billboard-sized poster advertising a "live spook show starring a magician called Dr. Satan" that Zombie owned. Additionally, the original cut also featured more exposition including more footage of the four teenage travelers on their road trip. The scene involving Bill being transformed into "Fishboy" was initially also much longer, featuring gory footage of the creation.

Universal Pictures provided Zombie with additional funds to reshoot the film's ending, in which Dr. Satan is featured as an actual character, eliminating the twist ending in which Grandpa Hugo impersonates the legendary figure. "I knew the [original] ending sucked, so I let it suck and they said, 'The movie's great but the ending sucks,'" said Zombie. "So they gave me more money and we shot a more elaborate ending, bigger sets, the whole razzamatazz." According to Zombie, the original cut of the film featuring the additional footage and original ending are lost.

== Music ==
The score for the film was composed by Zombie, alongside Canadian producer Scott Humphrey. Much of the production work for the soundtrack to the film was done in Humphrey's studio, The Chop Shop. The film's score featured similar musical themes to Zombie's releases, consisting of heavy metal influences. MTV said the music mixed "snippets of ominous hillbilly dialogue with grim horror movie rock". While making the movie, Zombie joked with his manager that he should do a cover of "Brick House" (1977), originally performed by Commodores. His manager later got both Lionel Richie and rapper Trina to appear on a cover of the song with Zombie, under the title "Brick House 2003". Aside from making audio clips and snippets for the film, Zombie recorded a variety of new songs for the film's soundtrack. The song "House of 1000 Corpses", taken from Zombie's album The Sinister Urge (2001), is also present. The soundtrack, released on March 25, 2003, made an appearance on the Billboard 200 chart in the United States. The soundtrack to the film is isolated on home video releases of the film as a separate audio track. Later in 2019, Rob Zombie announced that the soundtrack would be released on vinyl by the label Waxwork Records. The record included an essay by Zombie and a 12x12" photo booklet of behind the scenes photos.

== Release ==
=== Distribution ===
House of 1000 Corpses had a protracted distribution history. Prior to signing a deal with Universal Pictures, Zombie reportedly warned the studio of the film's nature, stating: "I was really blatant when I talked to them. I didn't want to get into a situation where they thought I was making something mainstream. And I told them that I wanted to make a drive-in movie, something very gritty and nasty and weird." After production wrapped in 2000, Universal was set to release the film in the summer of 2001. The studio completed a teaser trailer for the film, which was shown in cinemas and prior to the Universal ride created by Zombie, as well as being made available on the film's official website in June 2000. In the fall of 2000, the film was given a tentative release date of January 12, 2001.

On January 19, 2001, Universal submitted a rough cut of the film to the Motion Picture Association of America (MPAA), who granted it an NC-17 rating. In March 2001, it was reported that the studio had made the decision to drop the film from its roster because "Zombie’s contract required him to produce an R-rated film and the studio doesn’t think [it] is likely to garner that rating from the MPAA board." Then-head executive of Universal Pictures, Stacey Snider, expressed dislike for the film's graphic content and tone, stating that the decision to drop the film was "a content issue, not a witch-hunt response." During an early screening for executives, Zombie recalled: "It was obvious that Stacey was disturbed by the movie, which I took as a compliment. It was like, great, she's really freaked out by it. It must be a really scary movie." Terry Curtin, Universal's head of publicity, agreed with Snider's decision, commenting: "I'm not sure where the line is, but it was clear from watching the film that it had crossed it."

Following Universal's dropping of the film, Zombie repurchased the rights. Despite the cancellation of the distribution deal, the haunted house attraction designed by Zombie was launched at the studio's Halloween Horror Nights event in the fall of 2001, although the name was changed to "American Nightmare". Despite the name change, the attraction still featured numerous references to the film, and the theatrical trailer played for customers while they waited in the attraction's queue.

In June 2002, Zombie revealed that Metro-Goldwyn-Mayer (MGM) had agreed to distribute the film, with a tentative October 2002 release. The studio also assisted in final edits. "MGM is going to put it out," Zombie said. "Apparently, they have no morals over there. They’re happy for some blood." Several weeks later, MGM decided to back out of the distribution deal, offended by Zombie's remark. Following MGM's departure, Zombie announced plans to release the film himself, without the backing of a major studio.

In August 2002, it was announced that Lions Gate Films had officially acquired both theatrical and home video distribution rights. The film was re-cut and edited in order to achieve an R-rating, with Zombie claiming that most of the excised footage featured Sheri Moon's character.

=== Theatrical run ===
The first public screening of the film occurred in Argentina on March 13, 2003. The version screened at the Mar del Plata International Film Festival was 105 minutes long.

House of 1000 Corpses was theatrically released in North America on April 11, 2003. The film made its debut in the United Kingdom at Fright Fest in September 2003, and was the fastest-selling event of the night. A British general theatrical release followed on October 3, 2003.

=== Home media ===
Lions Gate Home Entertainment released House of 1000 Corpses on VHS and DVD on August 12, 2003. The menus on the DVD edition notably feature interactive footage of Sid Haig, Bill Moseley, and Sheri Moon performing in character, breaking the fourth wall and speaking to the viewer. Lions Gate issued a Blu-ray edition on September 18, 2007. The film was released again alongside its sequel, The Devil's Rejects (2005), in a combination set on January 4, 2011.

In 2023, a special 2-disc 20th anniversary edition Blu-ray was released by Lionsgate, in addition to an exclusive steelbook-packaged release. In October 2026, Lionsgate released the film in 4K UHD Blu-ray format as part of an eight-disc set featuring it alongside both sequels.

== Reception ==
=== Box office ===
House of 1000 Corpses earned $3.4 million during its opening weekend in the United States in 595 venues. The film opened in second at the box office, behind the comedy film Anger Management (2003). According to Zombie, Lions Gate Films made back their investment on the film on its first day of release, and shortly afterwards approached Zombie about a sequel to the film. The film went on to gross a total of $12,634,962 in the United States, with $4,194,583 in international markets, making for a worldwide box office gross of $16,829,545.

=== Critical response ===
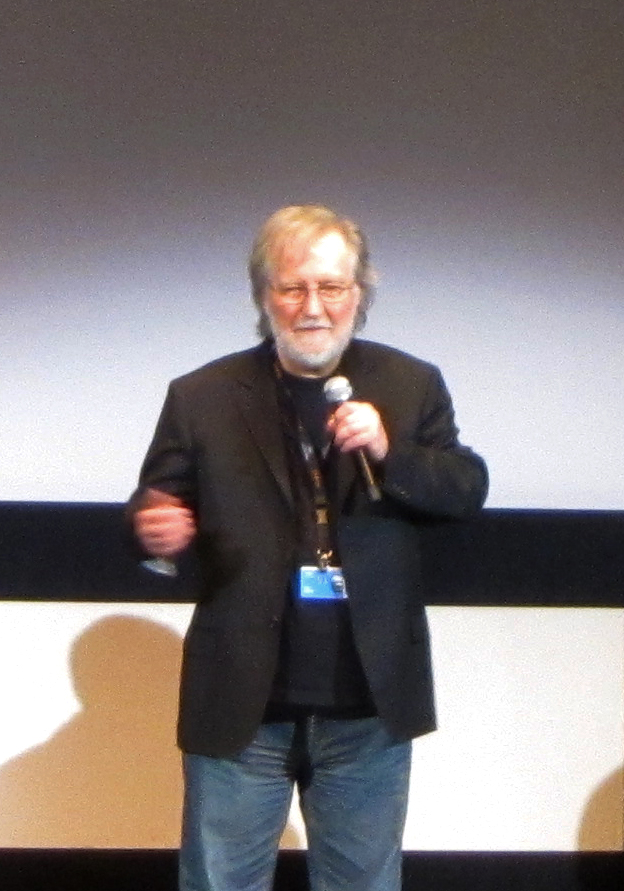
Critics noted the influence of the Tobe Hooper (above) film The Texas Chain Saw Massacre (1974).

House of 1000 Corpses received a generally negative critical reception upon its release. On the review aggregator website Rotten Tomatoes, 21% of 86 critics' reviews are positive. The site's consensus reads: "There's an abundance of gore in this derivative horror movie, but little sense or wit." Metacritic, which uses a weighted average, assigned the film a score of 31 out of 100, based on 15 critics, indicating "generally unfavorable" reviews.

Frank Scheck of The Hollywood Reporter wrote that the film "lives up to the spirit but not the quality of its inspirations" and is ultimately a "cheesy and ultragory exploitation horror flick" and "strangely devoid of thrills, shocks or horror". Clint Morris of Film Threat slammed the film as "an hour and a half of undecipherable plot" and found the film to be "sickening" overall. James Brundage of Filmcritic.com wrote that the film was simply "hick after hick, cheap scary image after cheap scary image, lots of southern accents and psychotic murders", and was "too highbrow to be a good cheap horror movie, too lowbrow to be satire, and too boring to bear the value of the ticket". Slant Magazine gave the film two out of four stars, stating, "If not for the blink-and-miss sideshow attractions and stockpile of memorable quotes, [House of] 1000 Corpses would have been easier to shrug off. This vintage curio is proudly and humorously derivative but that familiar aftertaste is that of wasted opportunities." The New York Times also had a negative review of the film, writing, "As much as film buffs might enjoy recognizing references to Motel Hell and other drive-in classics, Mr. Zombie's encyclopedic approach to the genre results in a crowded, frenzied film in which no single idea is developed to a satisfying payoff." The review also criticized the cutaway scenes and home footage used throughout the film, adding, "Mr. Zombie is both too much of a stylist, always cutting away to oddball inserts, black-and-white flashbacks, negative images and much else, and too little: he is not in enough control of his means to let a mood grow and fester. And festering is what this kind of film is all about."

JoBlo.com had a more positive view of the film, claiming it "slaps together just the right amount of creepy atmosphere, nervous laughter, cheap scares, fun rides and blood and guts to satisfy any major fan of the macabre". Horror Express gave the film a generally positive review, claiming, "He has succeeded for the most part, but really this is only a film Rob Zombie could do. Beyond the harkening back to the old days, there are instances where Zombie's signature style comes through. It's a style he has honed over the years through his videos, animations and music. Grotesque imagery is shown through skewed camera angles as grinning faces watch on. A use of bright fluorescents almost creates a deceptive atmosphere of childlike innocence as the devils perfect their craft on screen." Michael Gingold of Fangoria also praised the film's nightmarish tone and similarity to 1970s low-budget horror films, summarizing: "Watching House of 1000 Corpses, it’s easy to imagine yourself back in a Times Square grindhouse, and despite what certain New York politicians seem to think, that’s an experience we need more of these days."

Entertainment Weekly gave it a C+, saying, "House of 1000 Corpses "isn't coherent, exactly, but what dripping-ghoul horror movie is these days? The new rule is, It's not hip to make sense when you're raising hell." Maitland McDonagh of TV Guide gave the film two out of four stars, stating, "It is ugly—in the distinctively washed out, grainy, slightly burned manner of low-budget '70s films—gory and single-mindedly mean, none of which is a criticism since that's exactly what it wants to be." The project was well received by the Los Angeles Times, who wrote, "Let's give the devil his due. Zombie, who displays a natural flair for the cinematic, has a real appreciation and knowledge of horror pictures and a Diane Arbus-like affinity for sleazy, bizarre Americana and schlock culture. Throughout his fast-moving movie he inserts vintage clips in a witty, telling manner, and as to be expected, Zombie, with Scott Humphries, has come through with a rip-roaring score for his picture."

=== Accolades ===
Award/association	Year	Category	Recipient(s) and nominee(s)	Result	Ref.
Fangoria Chainsaw Awards	2004	Best Supporting Actor	Sid Haig	Won	
Fangoria Chainsaw Awards	2004	Best Supporting Actress	Karen Black	Won	
Fangoria Chainsaw Awards	2004	Best Wide-Release Film		Nominated	
Fangoria Chainsaw Awards	2004	Best Makeup/Creature FX	Wayne Toth	Nominated	
Fantasporto	2004	Best Special Effects	Wayne Toth; Michael O'Brien	Won	
Fantasporto	2004	Best Film	Rob Zombie	Nominated	
Rondo Hatton Classic Horror Awards	2003	Best Genre Film	Rob Zombie	Nominated	
Teen Choice Awards	2004	Choice Movie – Horror/Thriller		Nominated	

=== Retrospective assessment ===
Since its initial release, the film has gone on to gain a cult following. In his 2007 review of the Blu-ray release, Christopher Monfette of IGN called the film "fun as hell", writing, "House of 1000 Corpses is a messy film—veering this way and that across the genre map with no discernible destination. But viewed less a movie and more as an experience, the film offers a certain degree of inspired insanity and a healthy dose of carnival-like madness".

Zombie has acknowledged the film's cult status, stating, in 2015: "Now, a decade later, it's become a pretty loved movie among people. It's great that we have this big celebration. I love seeing Sid Haig and the other actors get such great attention from it. The funny thing is, ten years becomes a long time. I'll meet someone who's eighteen years old, and that's always been a film that they've loved. It's funny that the film's been around that long to be like that for some people." CinemaBlend also wrote of the film's cult status, stating, "While his Halloween films were a mess, Zombie did bring something new with his original films House of 1000 Corpses and The Devil's Rejects, developing a cult following for his movies on top of the one he earned for his music. Say what you will about him as a director, but there's no denying that he has a unique vision." Zombie has gone on to dismiss the film following its release, saying, "The first film [I directed], which people seems to love, is just a calamitous mess. Well, when it came out it seemed like everyone hated it. Now everyone acts like it's beloved in some way. All I see is flaw, upon flaw, upon flaw ... upon flaw." The success of the film led to two sequels, released in 2005 and 2019 respectively, and later a seasonal haunted house attraction at Universal Studios Hollywood.

== Sources ==
- Muir, John Kenneth (2023). Horror Films of 2000-2009. Jefferson, North Carolina: McFarland & Company. ISBN 978-1-476-64450-9.
