= Captain Spaulding (disambiguation) =

Captain Spaulding is a character played by Groucho Marx in the musical and later film Animal Crackers.

Captain Spaulding or Captain Spalding may also refer to:

- Captain Spaulding (Rob Zombie character), character played by Sid Haig in Rob Zombie films House of 1000 Corpses and The Devil's Rejects
- Captain Calvin Spalding, recurring character in M*A*S*H, played by Loudon Wainwright III
