= The Haunted World of El Superbeasto =

2009 film by Rob Zombie

- Theatrical release poster
- Directed by: Rob Zombie
- Screenplay by: Tom Papa; Rob Zombie
- Based on: The Haunted World of El Superbeasto by: Rob Zombie
- Produced by: Andy Gould; Tom Klein; Rob Zombie
- Starring: Tom Papa; Sheri Moon Zombie; Paul Giamatti; Rosario Dawson; Tom Kenny; Brian Posehn
- Edited by: Bret Marnell
- Music by: Tyler Bates (score); Hard 'n Phirm (songs)
- Production companies: Starz Media; Film Roman
- Distributed by: Anchor Bay Entertainment
- Release date: September 22, 2009
- Running time: 77 minutes
- Country: United States
- Language: English
- Budget: $10 million

The Haunted World of El Superbeasto is a 2009 American adult animated superhero black comedy film directed, co-written and co-produced by Rob Zombie. The film was written by Zombie and Tom Papa (who is also the voice of El Superbeasto) from Zombie's comic book series of the same name published by MVCreations. The film was also produced by Starz Media and Film Roman, with animation provided by Carbunkle Cartoons and Big Star Productions.

It's notable for being the only film directed by Zombie, that he was not the sole screenwriter for.

The film stars Papa, Sheri Moon Zombie, Paul Giamatti, Rosario Dawson, Tom Kenny, Geoffrey Lewis, Danny Trejo, Tura Satana, Clint Howard and Brian Posehn. Papa voices the character of El Superbeasto and Moon Zombie voices sidekick and sister, Suzi-X.

== Plot ==
The film follows the adventures of El Superbeasto (Tom Papa), a suave, yet violent exploitation film actor/director and former masked wrestler, and his sultry "sidekick" and sister, the super-agent Suzi-X (Sheri Moon Zombie), as they race to prevent the evil Dr. Satan (Paul Giamatti) and his sidekick Otto from taking over the world by marrying the foul-mouthed stripper with the mark of the devil on her backside, Velvet Von Black (Rosario Dawson). The adventure, set in the mythic world of Monsterland, also features Murray the Robot (Brian Posehn), Suzi-X's sidekick and vehicle, based on the robot featured in the 1939 serial The Phantom Creeps starring Bela Lugosi.

== Voice cast ==
- Tom Papa as El Superbeasto
- Sheri Moon Zombie as Suzi-X
- Paul Giamatti as Dr. Satan / Steve Wachowski
- Rosario Dawson as Velvet Von Black
- Tom Kenny as Otto / Rover / Old Man / Herbie
- Brian Posehn as Murray the Robot
- Dee Wallace as Trixie
- Ken Foree as Luke St. Luke
- Geoffrey Lewis as Lenny Crumpski / Roy Sullivan
- Lew Temple as Adam Banjo
- Rob Paulsen as Michael / Bobby Hyde / Commandant Hess / El Gato / Grossburger / Creature Preacher
- Daniel Roebuck as Morris Green
- Danny Trejo as Boss Rico
- Cassandra Peterson as Amber
- Debra Wilson as Cigarette Girl / Bride Frankenstein / Female Patron / Stripper in Hall / Telephone Victim / Old Woman
- Clint Howard as Joe Cthulhu
- Kevin Michael Richardson as Santa Baby
- April Winchell as Dame Grace Appleton / Liza / Babs / Dolly / Joan / Gloria / Scripty / Helga Strudel
- John DiMaggio as Burt the Spurt
- Laraine Newman as Lefty / Kate / Courtney / Smelga Strudel / Betty Sue Lou
- Jess Harnell as Soundy / Cameraman / Astronaut / Willey the Worm / Uncle Carl
- Charlie Adler as Krongar / Mooney McMoon / Albino Singer
- Joe Alaskey as Van Sloan / Jack / Erik the Newscaster
- Harland Williams as Gerard the Exterminator
- Carlos Alazraqui as Bennie Rodriguez
- Sid Haig as Captain Spaulding
- Bill Moseley as Otis Driftwood
- Tura Satana as Varla
- Dee Bradley Baker as Nazi zombie
- Rodger Bumpass as Screaming patron
- Jeff Bennett as Nerdy patron
- Adolf Hitler as Himself (archival recordings)

== Production ==
Work began on The Haunted World of El Superbeasto in 2006 and a release date was later scheduled for May 2007, but the film was completed in 2009. In an interview conducted on July 20, 2007, by shocktillyoudrop.com, Zombie explained that "Nothing really much [is happening]." While the film was still being animated, Zombie began work on Halloween. He informed the animators that he had "to walk away because I can't split my time between two things". Zombie noted that work on The Haunted World of El Superbeasto "started when I was on Rejects and it's now just sitting on a shelf waiting for me to finish Halloween".

In a November 2007 interview with Bloody Disgusting, Zombie announced that the film was "almost finished". He went on to say that, although he was then on tour until February, "we will finally finish the music on Superbeasto and it'll be done" afterwards.

Rob Zombie had the following to say in a September 28, 2008, posting on the official El Superbeasto Myspace page: "We're down to the end! 3 long years in the making and worth every second. By Halloween this thing will be in the can completely DONE!"

According to a blog post on October 29, 2008, Defamer Magazine was privy to a "sneak peek" at scenes from The Haunted World of El Superbeasto, about which they said "it's good to know that if WALL-E falls short on its quest for Oscar gold, we now have another animated contender."

In an October 29, 2008, Blender Magazine interview, Rob Zombie stated that "I've been working on [El Superbeasto] for three years, and I'm actually in the last weeks of it — I'm mixing the sound this week. I'm not sure of the release date yet, but that'll be out probably early 2009. It's a full-length adult animated comedy." The film was screen-tested for a 2009 release by Anchor Bay Entertainment.

== Release ==
IGN's March 20, 2009 exclusive interview with Rob Zombie revealed that "[The Haunted World of El Superbeasto] was finished, but its release had been delayed because of ownership and legal issues within the company that made the movie, Starz Media." In that same interview, Rob Zombie described the film as "Awesome...this little, tiny half-a-million dollar direct-to-video movie that expanded into this $10 million animated extravaganza. And it's awesome, but I don't have a release date yet. It's like an R-rated adult/monster/sex comedy. There's nothing really like it that I can think of. People always say like Ralph Bakshi's stuff, but...it's [more] like if SpongeBob and Scooby-Doo were filthy." The film, running feature length at 75 minutes, was released on DVD & Blu-Ray on September 22 of that year. A majority of the songs in the film are written and performed by Chris Hardwick and Mike Phirman's comedy duo Hard 'n Phirm.

Director Rob Zombie also references several other films. Tom Papa, writer and the voice of the titular character, incorporated his style of humor into his character. Throughout the film, El Superbeasto often makes observations at unusual moments, like Papa does in his stand-ups. Perhaps most notably is the surprise cameo appearance of Varla, the main antagonist of Faster, Pussycat! Kill! Kill!.

The Haunted World of El Superbeasto was released straight to Blu-ray on September 22, 2009 by Anchor Bay Entertainment.

== Reception ==
El Superbeasto received mixed reviews. On Rotten Tomatoes, the film has received a 40% approval rating from five critics, with an average score of 5.38/10.

=== Critical response ===
Evan Romero of Pop Horror wrote in his review: "Sex and violence abound in this animated flick definitely not for the kiddies! I swear, there are more bare breasts in this flick than in five XXX flicks combined and more violence than you can shake a rubber knife at." R.L. Shaffer of IGN wrote in his review: "El Superbeasto is a rough, but worthwhile, insane mind trip -- in the dark bemused spirit of the cult comic and animation underground, but mixed with something like Grindhouse.

Bill Gibron of DVD Talk wrote in his review: "If it had offered better bonus features, a compendium of conversation and clips explaining every part of the El Superbeasto process, this fantastic film would have easily earned the DVD Talk Collector Series tag. It is easily one of the best digital titles of the year, from feature presentation to the tech specs involved. Sadly, with the lacking extras, we are stuck solidly in Highly Recommended territory." Adrian Halen of Horror News Network wrote in his review: "Take a Tom and Jerry cartoon and add Rob Zombie to the mix and what do you have? Something wacky, crazy violent, sexy and absurd."
