= 3 from Hell =

2019 American horror film

- Theatrical release poster
- Directed by: Rob Zombie
- Written by: Rob Zombie
- Produced by: Mike Elliott; Rob Zombie; Tony Ciulla
- Starring: Sheri Moon Zombie; Bill Moseley; Richard Brake; Jeff Daniel Phillips; Dee Wallace; Emilio Rivera; Richard Edson; Kevin Jackson; Pancho Moler; Steven Michael Quezada; Clint Howard; Barry Bostwick; Danny Trejo; Sid Haig
- Cinematography: David V. Daniel
- Edited by: Glenn Garland
- Music by: Zeuss
- Production companies: Saban Films; Spookshow International Films; Capital Arts Entertainment
- Distributed by: Lionsgate
- Release date: September 16, 2019
- Running time: 115 minutes
- Country: United States
- Language: English
- Budget: $3 million
- Box office: $2.2 million

3 from Hell is a 2019 American horror film written, co-produced, and directed by Rob Zombie. It is the third and final installment in the Firefly trilogy, which began with House of 1000 Corpses (2003), and stars Sheri Moon Zombie, Bill Moseley, Richard Brake, and Sid Haig. Ten years have passed since the events of The Devil's Rejects (2005). The plot follows an incarcerated Otis Driftwood and Baby Firefly being freed by Otis's half-brother, after barely surviving a police shootout a decade ago.

Unlike the previous installments, 3 from Hell was given a special three-night theatrical engagement through Fathom Events from September 16–18, 2019, and received a mixed response from film critics. Since it grossed nearly $2 million, Fathom Events gave it a one-night release on October 14, before the film was released on home video the following day. This was the last film of Haig's released before his death on September 21, 2019, five days after the film's release.

== Plot ==
The film opens with several news reports about the Firefly family's murderous rampage. Through the reports, it is revealed that Baby, Otis, and Captain Spaulding miraculously survived their shootout with the police and that they will be tried for their crimes. The trial is widely covered nationwide and becomes a cause célèbre, resulting in the organization of protests that insist the trio's innocence. Numerous fanatics also adopt the chant "Free the Three", claiming that their crimes were committed as a means to fight against the system. Despite this, all three are found guilty and sentenced to life in prison. In addition to the final verdict, Captain Spaulding is executed via lethal injection. Otis' half-brother, Winslow Foxworth "Foxy" Coltrane, shows up to help Otis escape from prison while he is outside doing work on a chain gang. In the process, Otis kills Rondo, who was also on the chain gang after having been arrested some time after the end of the previous film and been sent to the same prison but did not recognize Otis. Meanwhile, Baby unsuccessfully seeks parole, as her mental state has further deteriorated since her incarceration.

Once free, Otis and Foxy begin planning to free Baby from prison. To accomplish this, they kidnap the family and friends of the prison's warden, Virgil Dallas Harper. Otis and Foxy demand that Harper help Baby sneak out of prison or they will murder everyone they hold hostage. Harper follows their commands and sneaks Baby out of prison by disguising her as a guard. However, once Baby is freed, Otis and Foxy decide to eliminate the loose ends and kill all the hostages, as well as Harper. Now united, the three are undecided as to what to do next but eventually decide to flee to Mexico, a decision that is made more pressing due to Baby's growing instability.

Otis, Baby, and Foxy manage to successfully cross the border and flee to a small town in Mexico that is celebrating the Day of the Dead and hole up in the town's lone hotel. They briefly worry about being recognized but dismiss these concerns, unaware that the hotel's owner has in fact recognized them and has alerted Rondo's son, gangster Aquarius, to their location. The owner keeps them occupied with both the celebration and local prostitutes, while Aquarius heads out to the location with several henchmen in tow. The following morning, Baby bonds with a local worker, Sebastian, who notices Aquarius's arrival. He warns Baby of the danger before running to warn Otis, just as Aquarius's men break into the whorehouse. Otis and Sebastian hold off the attackers until Foxy arrives and rescues them both. Otis separates from them, managing to successfully find the hotel owner and kill him. During this time, Baby manages to kill several of Aquarius's men using a bow and arrow set she took from Harper's house. Eventually, Foxy and Baby are outmatched by Aquarius and taken prisoner. During this, Aquarius tells Sebastian that he is not worth the bullet and leaves him for dead. Aquarius and his remaining goons use Baby and Foxy to draw Otis out into the open.

Otis appears and squares off against one of Aquarius's men in a knife fight, while Sebastian sneaks up and silently frees both Foxy and Baby. This enrages Aquarius, distracting his man in the knife fight and allowing Otis to gain the upper hand. He, Baby, and Foxy manage to overpower Aquarius; however, Sebastian is shot and killed in the process. The film ends with the trio immolating Aquarius before walking off into the Mexican town and driving away on the same highway from the beginning.

== Cast ==
- Sheri Moon Zombie as Vera-Ellen "Baby" Firefly
- Bill Moseley as Otis B. Driftwood
- Sid Haig as Captain Spaulding / Johnny Lee Johns
- Richard Brake as Winslow Foxworth "Foxy" Coltrane
- Danny Trejo as Rondo Mendoza Chavez
- Dee Wallace as Greta
- Daniel Roebuck as Morris Green
- Jeff Daniel Phillips as Warden Virgil Dallas Harper
- Pancho Moler as Sebastian
- Steven Michael Quezada as Diego
- Jackie S. Garcia as Princesa
- Bill Oberst Jr. as Tony "Commando"
- Lucinda Jenney as Nebraska
- Austin Stoker as Earl Gibson
- Emilio Rivera as Francisco "Aquarius" Mendoza Chavez
- Clint Howard as Mr. Baggy Britches
- David Ury as Travis O‘Rourke
- Richard Edson as Carlos Perro
- Kevin Jackson as Gerard James
- Tracey A. Leigh as Judy Harper
- Sylvia Jefferies as Heather "Starship" Galen
- Wade Williams as Buford Tuttle
- Sean Whalen as Burt Willie
- Jan Hoag as Betty Lou
- Stacie Greenwell as Janice
- Anny Rosario as Juanita
- Matthew Willig as "Creep"
- Dot-Marie Jones as "Slackjaw"
- Nancy Linehan Charles as Dr. Bowman
- Emiliano Díez as Rodrigo
- Richard Riehle as Sheriff Wolf
- Tomas Boykin as Derek Zoom
- Alexandra Ella as Tracee Wild
- Rob Welsh as Luke "Luke-Luke"
- Flor De Maria Chahua as Bella
- Alicia Adams as "Poker"
- Billy Blair as Garbage Man
- Mariano 'Big Dawg' Mendoza as Gonzalo "Gonzo"
- Greg Serano as "Warlock"
- Christine Weatherup as Abigail Duck
- Christopher B. Duncan as "Glassy" Wolf
- Tom Papa as News Anchor George Glass
- Noel G. as "Bullet"
- Esteban Cueto as "Big Cue"
- Marco Morales as "Clutch"
- Gabriel 'G-Rod' Rodriguez as "Shovel"
- Chaz Bono as Digby Neville (uncredited)
- Duane Whitaker as Mr. Bankhead (uncredited)
- Barry Bostwick as The Narrator

== Production ==
Principal photography began on March 13, 2018, and wrapped on April 10, 2018. The Sybil Brand Institute in Los Angeles, a decommissioned women's prison, served as one filming location.

Post-production was postponed five months to allow completion of Zombie's and Marilyn Manson's tour. The editing process began on September 11, 2018, with sound mixing commencing on March 15, 2019, and completed by the end of April.

According to Rob Zombie, Sid Haig was originally going to have a larger role but was unable to commit for the whole film due to health issues. As a result, the script was rewritten to introduce Richard Brake's character to take his place. Haig died on September 21, 2019, shortly after the film was released.

=== Music ===
The soundtrack was composed by Zeuss and was released by Waxwork Records on vinyl.

== Release ==
The first trailer was released in June 2019. Fathom Events held an unrated three-day theatrical release from September 16–18, 2019. The first night featured a special video introduction with Zombie and a commemorative poster. The second featured a behind-the-scenes look at a making-of and all Cinemark locations will be distributing an exclusive bumper sticker designed by Zombie. The third night included a double feature of 3 from Hell and The Devil's Rejects.

The film earned $1.92 million, which was successful enough that Fathom Events announced plans to return the film to theaters on October 14.

=== Critical response ===
On review aggregator Rotten Tomatoes, the film holds an approval rating of 58% based on 38 reviews, with an average rating of 5.6/10. The website's critics consensus reads: "3 from Hell may be of interest to fans of the trilogy, but those not already on board with Rob Zombie's gory saga will find little to lure them in here." On Metacritic, the film has a weighted average score of 50 out of 100, based on 5 critics, indicating "mixed or average" reviews.

Scout Tafoya of RogerEbert.com awarded the film four out of four stars, referring to it as Zombie's "most earnest and laid back nightmare yet". Shawn Garrett of Rue Morgue, while conceding that there are "no surprises here", deemed the film "a fitfully entertaining exercise in 'more of the same' as grimy crime film". Cody Hamman of JoBlo.com awarded the film seven out of ten, writing: "While I do still wish the ending of The Devil's Rejects had been the end for these characters, I did find 3 from Hell to be a decent sequel." During the premiere, Kevin Smith called the film "horror heaven".

Luke Y. Thompson of Forbes said of the main actors "all three deserve better than re-quel hell". Meagan Navarro of Consequence of Sound wrote, "Having been down these exact same roads before, the climax is bereft of any tension and stakes...by the time the end credits roll, you feel it." A.A. Dowd of The A.V. Club found the film unnecessary, giving it a D+ and calling it "a slow death by nostalgia". Similarly, John Squires of Bloody Disgusting awarded the film one-and-a-half skulls out of five, writing: "3 from Hell is proof that sometimes in horror, dead really is better." Comics Beat reviewer Edward Douglas deemed the film "easily, the worst movie of the year".

=== Home media ===
It was released on DVD and Blu-ray on October 15, 2019.

== Awards and nominations ==
Year	Award	Category	Recipient(s)	Result	Ref.
2019	Fright Meter Awards	Best Actor	Bill Moseley	Nominated	
2019	Fright Meter Awards	Best Supporting Actress	Dee Wallace	Nominated	
