= Matthew McGrory =

American actor (1973–2005)

- McGrory at the world premiere of Big Fish in 2003
- Born: May 17, 1973; West Chester, Pennsylvania, U.S.
- Died: August 9, 2005 (aged 32); Los Angeles, California, U.S.
- Education: West Chester University; Widener University
- Occupation: Actor
- Years active: 1994–2005
- Height: 7 ft 6 in (2.29 m)
- Awards: Guinness World Records: Tallest actor, biggest feet, longest toe.

Matthew McGrory (May 17, 1973 – August 9, 2005) was an American actor. At 7 ft 6 in (2.29 m), he was recognized as the tallest actor by Guinness World Records. He portrayed physically imposing characters throughout his career, including Tiny Firefly in the horror films House of 1000 Corpses (2003) and The Devil's Rejects (2005) and Karl the Giant in the fantasy comedy-drama Big Fish (2003). McGrory also held the Guinness World Records for biggest feet and longest toe.

== Early life ==
McGrory was born in West Chester, Pennsylvania, the son of William and Maureen McGrory. He was 15 pounds, 4 ounces when he was born. He was over 5 feet (150 cm) tall by the time he completed kindergarten. McGrory grew to the height of 7 ft 6 in (2.29 m) and had size 29.5 shoes. He attended a Catholic School that allowed him to wear sneakers because dress shoes did not exist in his size. He studied pre-law at Widener University. He also studied Criminal Justice at West Chester University.

== Career ==
McGrory's large size led to appearances on daytime talk shows hosted by Maury Povich, Jenny Jones and Oprah Winfrey and in music videos including Iron Maiden's "The Wicker Man" and the 1999 Marilyn Manson "Coma White" (and God Is in the T.V. VHS cover). He can also be seen in Blondie's video for their 2003 hit "Good Boys."

Due to his extraordinary height and deep voice, he appeared on The Howard Stern Show beginning in December 1996. He was the first "Bigfoot" in Stern's Wack Pack. He has appeared in movies, often cast as a giant, in films such as Bubble Boy (2001), House of 1000 Corpses (2003), Big Fish (2003), and The Devil's Rejects (2005). Television appearances included Malcolm in the Middle, Charmed, and as a freak show performer during the Great Depression in HBO's period series Carnivàle.

== Death ==
On August 9, 2005 while living in Sherman Oaks, California with his girlfriend Melissa, McGrory died at age 32 of congestive heart failure.

The DVD release of Rob Zombie's film The Devil's Rejects was dedicated to McGrory’s memory.

== Filmography ==
Year	Title	Role	Notes
1999	Coma White	Gaunt	Marilyn Manson - Coma White (Official Music Video)
2000	The Dead Hate the Living!	Gaunt	
2001	Bubble Boy	Human Sasquatch	
2001	Malcolm in the Middle	Lothar	Season 2 Episode 23
2002	Men in Black II	Tall Alien	Uncredited
2003	House of 1000 Corpses	Tiny Firefly	
2003	Big Fish	Karl the Giant	
2003	Haggard: The Movie	Doorman at 15 North Cafe	Uncredited
2003–2004	Charmed	Ogre	2 episodes
2003–2005	Carnivàle	Giant	3 episodes
2004	Planet of the Pitts	Toto	
2004	Big Time	Richard Blunderbore	
2005	Constantine	Demon	Uncredited
2005	The Devil's Rejects	Tiny Firefly	
2005	ShadowBox	Hort Willows	
2017	The Evil Within	Giant at Overlook Cafe	Posthumous role, dedicated to McGrory; filmed in 2002
