= Devil in My Ride =

- Directed by: Gary Michael Schultz
- Written by: Mike Dozier, Gary Michael Schultz
- Starring: Frank Zieger, Joey Bicicchi, Erin Breen
- Cinematography: Armando Ballesteros
- Edited by: Michael Heffler
- Music by: Tim Montijo
- Production companies: Devil In My Ride, GMS Films
- Release date: October 6, 2013 (Shriekfest)
- Running time: 95 minutes
- Country: United States
- Language: English

Devil in My Ride is a 2013 American horror comedy road movie and the feature film directorial debut of Gary Michael Schultz, who also co-wrote the movie's script. It had its world premiere on October 6, 2013 at Shriekfest and was released to video on demand the following year. It stars Joey Bicicchi and Erin Breen as a couple whose dream wedding is ruined when the bride gets possessed by the Devil. Filming took place in Chicago and Las Vegas.

== Synopsis ==
Hank (Joey Bicicchi) and Doreen (Erin Breen) are madly in love and can't wait to get married. They've planned out their special day in painstaking detail, from what to wear to who to invite. Everything seems to be going well until Doreen's brother Travis (Frank Zieger) shows up with a present for his sister, a beautiful but cursed locket that causes Doreen to get possessed by the Devil. Now Travis and Hank have to drive to Las Vegas in order to find Johnny Priest (Llou Johnson) a homeless exorcist and the last known person to have successfully performed an exorcism- something made more difficult because they only have 72 hours to find Johnny and perform the exorcism before Doreen's soul is forever lost.

== Cast ==
- Frank Zieger as Travis
- Joey Bicicchi as Hank
- Erin Breen as Doreen
- Sid Haig as Iggy
- Llou Johnson as Johnny Priest
- Zarinah Ali as Veronica the Sales Clerk
- Hud Cantu as Groomsman Hud
- Tom Carlson as Gustor
- Harold Dennis as Mechanic
- Craig J. Harris as Pawn Shop Owner
- Chris Heinrich as Groomsman Rick
- Cathleen Hennon as Church Woman
- Dave Lipschutz as Beaver
- Rachel Joy Mazza as Gypsy
- Benjamin Nicholson as Gator

== Receptions ==
Fangoria gave Devil in My Ride a positive review, praising the film for its acting and "squirm-worthy horror moments". Twitch Film and Dread Central were more mixed in their reviews, as they both felt that the movie's tone was inconsistent at times and Twitch Film wrote that it "doesn't strike as an incredibly creative piece of guerrilla filmmaking, but it is for sure an entertaining trip to enjoy with a bunch of friends."
