= The Lords of Salem (film) =

- Theatrical release poster
- Directed by: Rob Zombie
- Written by: Rob Zombie
- Produced by: Rob Zombie; Jason Blum; Andy Gould; Oren Peli
- Starring: Sheri Moon Zombie; Bruce Davison; Jeff Daniel Phillips; Ken Foree; Patricia Quinn; Dee Wallace; María Conchita Alonso; Judy Geeson; Meg Foster
- Cinematography: Brandon Trost
- Edited by: Glenn Garland
- Music by: John 5; Griffin Boice
- Production companies: Haunted Movies; IM Global
- Distributed by: Alliance Films (Canada); Anchor Bay Films (United States); Entertainment One; Momentum Pictures (United Kingdom)
- Release dates: September 10, 2012 (TIFF); April 19, 2013 (U.S.)
- Running time: 101 minutes
- Countries: Canada; United Kingdom; United States
- Language: English
- Budget: $1.5 million
- Box office: $1.5 million

The Lords of Salem is a 2012 supernatural horror film written, produced, and directed by Rob Zombie, and starring Sheri Moon Zombie, Bruce Davison, Jeff Daniel Phillips, Ken Foree, Patricia Quinn, Dee Wallace, María Conchita Alonso, Judy Geeson, and Meg Foster. The plot focuses on a troubled female disc jockey in Salem, Massachusetts, whose life becomes entangled with a coven of ancient Satan-worshipping women.

The film started shooting on October 17, 2011, and premiered at the Toronto International Film Festival on September 10, 2012. The film was given a limited release in the United States on April 19, 2013. It grossed $1.5 million internationally, and received mixed reviews from critics.

A novelization, written by Rob Zombie (with B. K. Evenson), was published one month prior to the film's theatrical release.

== Plot ==
In Salem, Massachusetts, Heidi, a recovering drug addict, works as a disc jockey at a hard rock station with her co-workers Whitey and Munster. She receives a strange wooden box containing an album by a band named The Lords. She and Whitey listen to the record, which consists of a series of ominous string and woodwind instruments. Heidi has a vision of women who worship Satan ritually birthing a baby, then damning the child.

The next day, Heidi interviews Francis Matthias, who has written a book about the Salem witch trials. The station plays the Lords' record, which causes all of the women in Salem to enter a trance. Megan, a palm reader and the sister of Heidi's landlady Lacy, tells her that she is fated to succumb to her dark sexual desires. Later, Heidi enters the vacant apartment 5 and experiences visions of a demon and a nude witch who commands she "bleed us a king". Heidi wakes up in bed and assumes the events were a nightmare.

Troubled, she visits a Catholic chapel and falls asleep, dreaming that she is sexually assaulted by the priest. She flees but is faced with a ghostly entity. Meanwhile, Matthias researches the Lords, and discovers some music in a book. He confirms that it is the same music heard on the record and tracks down the author, who tells him that in the late 17th century, Reverend Jonathan Hawthorne accused a coven of Satan worshippers of creating the music to control the women of Salem. As a result, Hawthorne had the women executed, but not before their leader, Margaret Morgan, put a curse on the Salem women and Hawthorne's descendants, calling his bloodline "the vessel by which the devil's child would inherit the earth". Soon later, Matthias discovers that Heidi is a descendant of Rev. Hawthorne.

Heidi continues to experience increasingly disturbing visions. Distraught, she begins using drugs again. Lacy and her sisters Sonny and Megan enter Heidi's apartment. Matthias tries to call Heidi to tell her the truth about the Lords and her lineage, but cannot reach her. The women then take Heidi to apartment 5. Inside, there appears to be a huge opera house with a demon on a throne. He screams and embraces her with tentacle-like appendages.

The next day, Matthias tries to tell Heidi again the truth about the Lords and her lineage. Lacy and her sisters encounter him and invite him for tea while inquiring about the nature of his visit before killing him with a frying pan. Heidi hears his murder taking place but does nothing. Whitey, who has been trying to keep tabs on Heidi even through her struggles, goes to her apartment so the two can attend the concert of The Lords. Heidi ditches Whitey in order to view the concert, while Lacy, Sonny, Megan, and the ghosts of Margaret and her coven begin to perform a satanic rite in which Heidi joins. The music that emanates from the Lords causes the female audience members to strip off their clothing. In the midst of surreal visions, Heidi blissfully gives birth to a strange creature which looks akin to a crawfish, atop the corpses of the naked audience members.

The next day, Heidi's station reports on a mass suicide of 32 female members of the Salem Historical Lifer Society—all descendants of the original settlers of Salem village—at the concert, as well as the disappearance of Heidi.

== Cast ==
- Sheri Moon Zombie as Heidi LaRoc / Adelaide Hawthorne
- Bruce Davison as Francis Matthias
- Jeff Daniel Phillips as Herman "Whitey" Salvador
- Judy Geeson as Lacy Doyle
- Meg Foster as Margaret Morgan
- Patricia Quinn as Megan
- Dee Wallace as Sonny
- Ken Foree as Herman "Munster" Jackson
- María Conchita Alonso as Alice Matthias
- Andrew Prine as Reverend Jonathan Hawthorne
- Richard Fancy as A.J. Kennedy
- Camille Keaton as Doris Von Fux
- Bonita Friedericy as Abigail Hennessey
- Nancy Linehan Charles as Clovis Hales
- Barbara Crampton as Virginia Cable
- Torsten Voges as Count Gorgann
- Michael Berryman as Virgil Magnus
- Sid Haig as Dean Magnus
- Ernest Lee Thomas as Chip McDonald
- Lisa Marie as Priscilla
- Clint Howard as Carlo
- Michael Shamus Wiles as Jarrett Perkins
- Brandon Cruz as Ted
- Daniel Roebuck as "Frankenmonster"
- Udo Kier as Witchhunter
- Christopher Knight as Keith "Lobster Joe" Williams
- John 5 as Halvard
- Piggy D as Olaf "Butcher Olaf"
- Julian Acosta as The Priest

== Themes ==
Several critics and writers have interpreted The Lords of Salem as a metaphor for drug addiction, as its lead character suffers as a recovering addict who relapses amidst the supernatural occurrences she experiences. Lisa Rose of NJ.com notes: "Because Heidi is a recovering drug addict, it’s tough to say whether she is witnessing the resurrection of Salem witches or if her delirium is chemically induced."

Patrick Bromley, writing for Bloody Disgusting, views the film as a tragedy, summarizing: "Its protagonist, Heidi Hawthorne, a radio DJ and a descendant of a Puritan responsible for executing women he accused of being witches in the 17th century, spends the whole film on a trajectory over which she has no control. Her fate was determined over 300 years ago when Margaret Morgan (Meg Foster) put a curse on the women of Salem and on the Puritan’s bloodline. Heidi has no real agency over what is happening to her, not the nightmares in her sleep nor the visions when she’s awake... We know that the only thing that can possibly await her at the end of the film is her own doomed undoing, yet we, too, are helpless."

== Production ==
=== Development ===
The Lords of Salem is the third film from Haunted Movies, the first two being Insidious and The Bay. After directing the remake of Halloween and its sequel, Rob Zombie stated that he wanted to try something different and original. Also factoring into Zombie's decision was that he was offered complete creative freedom for the project, something that he did not have for either of his Halloween pictures. Zombie had the idea for the movie before starting on the second Halloween movie; however, as he puts it, "it wasn't really like I was working on it. I was like, 'Oh, this would kind of be a cool idea. Like, Salem radio station, blah blah blah, music', and then [I] forgot I even wrote that down." After Jason Blum came to Zombie asking for something "supernatural in nature", Zombie was reminded of the Salem idea. Despite this, Zombie stated that much of the original concept changed significantly, noting that once the project got underway that he "basically started writing it from scratch".

=== Filming ===
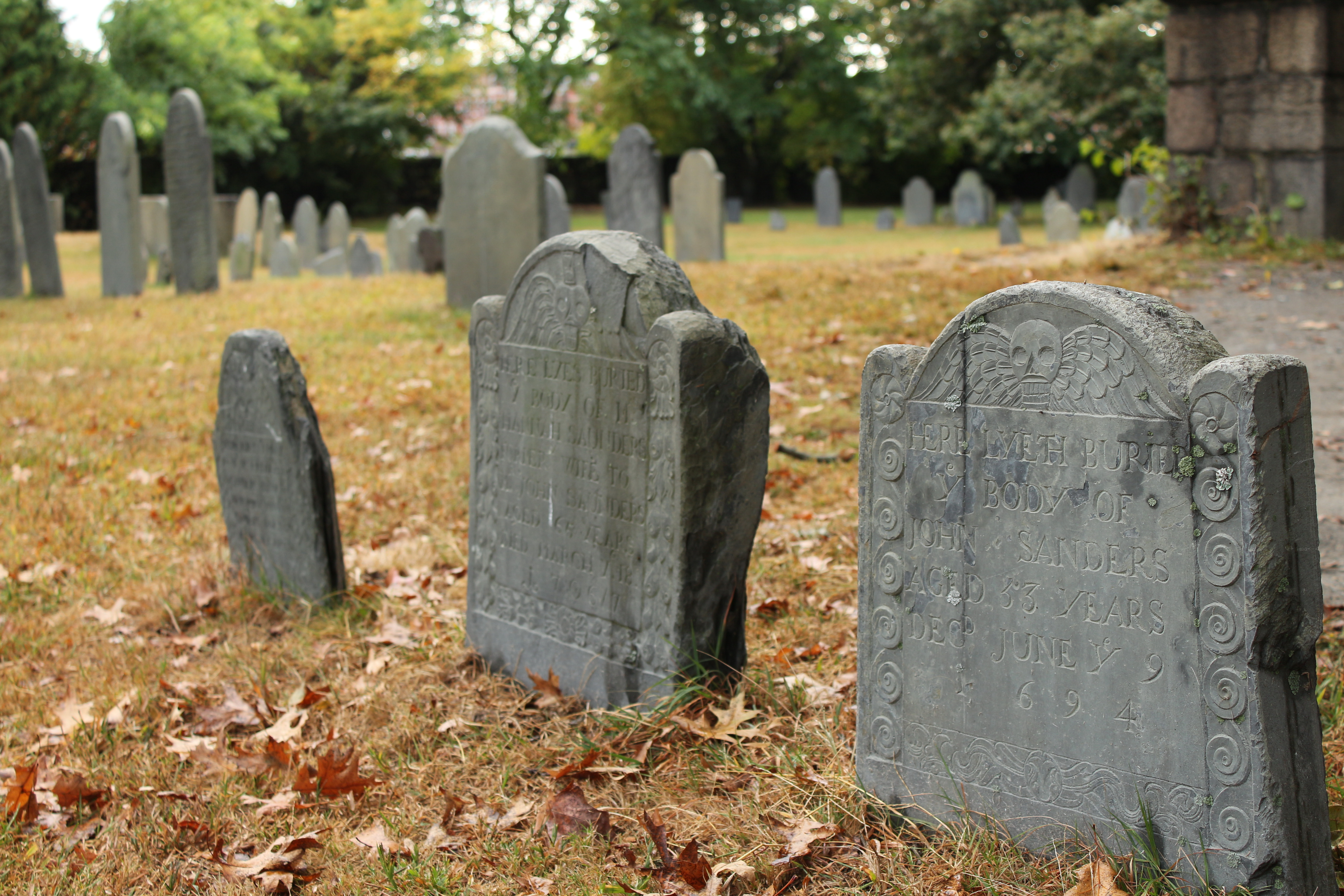
Part of the film was shot at the Old Burying Point cemetery in Salem, Massachusetts

Principal photography for The Lords of Salem began in April 2011, with filming taking place on location in Los Angeles and Salem, Massachusetts. Some shooting took place in the Charter Street Historic District in Salem, including at the Old Burying Point cemetery. In Los Angeles, the Linda Vista Community Hospital and the Los Angeles Theatre were also used as a filming location. Filming was done quickly, at a rate faster than Zombie was used to for his films and as a result much of the script was changed to adjust to the abbreviated schedule.

In an interview, Zombie said that the film would be his cinematically biggest film and described it as "if Ken Russell directed The Shining". Lords became the last film of veteran actor Richard Lynch, who died in 2012 – though, due to Lynch's worsening health and being close to blindness, Rob Zombie could not film his scenes properly and was forced to re-shoot the scenes with Andrew Prine. Later, actor Michael Berryman provided further insight in the problems on set: the opening sequence involved four pages of scenes that called for Berryman, Lynch, Haig and Prine (in another role). However, Lynch did not remember his lines, and he was called to read a declaration of judgement out loud, but as Lynch had trouble seeing, that did not work either so the actors were sent home. Rob Zombie was not given another shooting day on location and the situation was further complicated with Lynch's death. Not given the funds to film the sequence, much of it was dropped.

A sequence involving a faux film called “Frankenstein and the Witchhunter”, featuring Clint Howard, Udo Kier, and Camille Keaton, was cut from the final release. Bruce Dern was originally cast as Francis Matthias but had to drop out due to scheduling conflicts; he was replaced by Bruce Davison.

== Release ==
The Lords of Salem premiered at the 2012 Toronto International Film Festival on September 10, 2012. It was given a limited theatrical release in the United States by Anchor Bay Films on April 19, 2013.

=== Marketing ===
Between the film wrapping and editing, Zombie embarked on a tour with his band, which he stated "was a great idea on paper, but in execution it's been insanity." The trailer debuted at Zombie's concert on May 11, 2012, at the PNC Bank Arts Center.

An official one-sheet poster for the film was released on February 4, 2013.

=== Home media ===
Anchor Bay Entertainment released The Lords of Salem on DVD and Blu-ray on September 5, 2013. The film earned $3,519,029 in initial DVD sales, and an additional $1,926,330 in Blu-ray sales. In 2014, a limited edition steelbook Blu-ray was made available exclusively at FYE.

== Reception ==
=== Box office ===
The film opened in a limited theatrical release in the United States on April 19, 2013, in 354 theaters, and earning $642,942 during its opening weekend. By the end of its theatrical run, it had grossed $1,165,882 in the United States, with an additional $379,107 in international markets, making for a worldwide gross of $1,544,989.

=== Critical response ===
On the review aggregator website Rotten Tomatoes, 45% of 62 critics' reviews are positive, with an average rating of 5.7/10. The website's consensus reads: "The Lords of Salem has lots of atmospheric portent, but it's unfortunately short on scares." Metacritic, which uses a weighted average, assigned the film a score of 57 out of 100, based on 21 critics, indicating "mixed or average" reviews.

The initial response at the 2012 Toronto International Film Festival was overall positive, with Fangoria and The Playlist giving the film positive reviews. Horror-Movies.ca compared it favorably to Dario Argento films like Suspiria but felt it would not appeal to mainstream audiences. Mark Olsen of the Los Angeles Times described the film as Zombie's "most undiluted vision yet, a movie intended as a contraption for unsettling audiences, a mood piece meant to evoke a particularly dark turn of the mind." Twitch Film's Ryland Aldrich similarly expressed enthusiasm over the film and recommended it to horror fans, while Simon Abrams of RogerEbert.com awarded the film 3 out of 4 stars, feeling Zombie "tested his considerable skills and tried something different" in his first film with full creative control and described Sheri Moon Zombie's performance as her best yet.

Scott Weinberg of Fearnet panned the film's editing and narrative style, as well as Rob Zombie's casting of Sheri Moon Zombie in the lead role. Bloody Disgusting published two reviews, one panning it and the other praising it. Neil Gerzinger of The New York Times gave the film a mixed review, noting that "considerable care goes into establishing the premise, but the film eventually abandons psychological subtlety for hallucinatory garishness, which is too bad. Rob Zombie fans, though, who may go into this film with a certain set of expectations, will have plenty to talk about when they leave."

Nick Schager from Slant Magazine praised the film's visuals, noting that "Rob Zombie understands horror as an aural-visual experience that should gnaw at the nerves, seep into the subconscious, and beget unshakeable nightmares." The New York Post's V.A. Mussetto praised the film: "Movies by Rob Zombie, the goth rocker turned cult filmmaker, aren't for everybody. But he couldn't care less. He makes movies exactly the way he wants to, with no thought of pleasing mainstream audiences. They can like it or lump it. His latest effort, The Lords of Salem, is true to form." Philip French of The Guardian praised the film as "frighteningly good" and compared its style to that of European horror films, as well as to Roman Polanski's Rosemary's Baby (1968).

=== Accolades ===
Year	Award	Category	Recipient(s)	Result	Ref.
2013	South by Southwest	Audience Award—Midnight Films	Rob Zombie	Nominated	
2013	Fright Meter Awards	Best Score	John 5	Won	
2013	Fright Meter Awards	Best Cinematography	Brandon Trost	Nominated	
2013	Horror Central Fan's Choice Awards	Favorite Horror Film	Rob Zombie	Nominated	
2013	Horror Central Fan's Choice Awards	Best Screenplay	Rob Zombie	Nominated	
2013	Horror Central Fan's Choice Awards	Screamworthy—Best of 2013	Rob Zombie	Nominated	
2014	Fangoria Chainsaw Awards	Best Limited-Release/Direct-to-Video Film	Rob Zombie	Write-in	
2014	Fangoria Chainsaw Awards	Best Actress	Sheri Moon Zombie	Write-in	
2014	Fangoria Chainsaw Awards	Best Supporting Actress	Meg Foster	Write-in	
2014	Fangoria Chainsaw Awards	Best Screenplay	Rob Zombie	Write-in	
2014	Fangoria Chainsaw Awards	Best Score	John 5, Griffin Boice	Write-in	
2014	Fangoria Chainsaw Awards	Best Makeup/Creature FX	Wayne Toth	Write-in	

== Novelization ==
A novelization of the film, written by Zombie and contributor B. K. Evenson, was released on March 12, 2013. Zombie and Evenson began working on the novelization after Zombie's manager had been approached by Grand Central Publishing about a potential book tie-in. The idea interested Zombie, who expressed a fondness for movie tie-in novels as a child.

Of the book, Zombie has also commented that it "offers a different experience from the film since it can obviously go into much more detail" and that the book is based on the original screenplay for Lords of Salem, which differs significantly from the final script used in the film.

The book also marks Rob Zombie's first time appearing on the New York Times Bestseller List.

Critical reception for the novel has been mixed. The Boston Globe praised Zombie's novelization, saying that the "writing throughout is graphic—definitely not for the squeamish—but the pace escalates compellingly". In contrast, Publishers Weekly gave a negative review for the book, criticizing parts of the book as "predictable", "unengaging and not particularly scary".

== Soundtrack ==
In October 2012 Zombie stated that he had hired guitarist John 5 to create the movie's score. John 5 remarked that he wanted to create "material that wouldn't distract audiences but also wouldn't be easily forgotten". Zombie later released the soundtrack's central song, "All Tomorrow's Parties" by The Velvet Underground & Nico, commenting that "Every RZ movie has at least one song that gets stuck in your head and changes the way you will forever hear the song". The Lords of Salem's soundtrack was released by UMe on April 16, 2013. Although not on the soundtrack CD, the film makes prominent use of Wolfgang Amadeus Mozart's Requiem and Johann Sebastian Bach's Sei gegrüsset, Jesu gütig, BWV 768.

== See also ==
- List of films about witchcraft
