= Sheri Moon Zombie =

American actress

- Born: Sheri Lyn Skurkis; September 26, 1970 (age 56); San Jose, California, U.S.
- Other names: Kitty Moon; Sheri Moon
- Occupations: Actress; fashion designer; model; dancer
- Years active: 1996–present
- Spouse: Rob Zombie (m. 2002)
- Website: sherimoonzombie.com

Sheri Moon Zombie (born Sheri Lyn Skurkis; September 26, 1970) is an American actress, model, dancer, and fashion designer.

== Early life ==
Moon was born on September 26, 1970, in San Jose, California, the daughter of William "Bill" Skurkis (1947–2010) and Carol A. Skurkis, but was raised in Connecticut. She has a brother, Jeffrey. She graduated from Plainville High School in Plainville, Connecticut. After graduation, she moved to Los Angeles, California; however she soon found herself moving between homes in both states to attend school and seek work.

== Career ==
Moon had aspirations to do cartoon voice-overs and took classes. She briefly attended the Connecticut School of Broadcasting to become an MTV VJ, but Moon found herself preoccupied going on tour with Rob Zombie. When Rob Zombie's band White Zombie disbanded and he went solo, he took Moon on as a dancer where she also choreographed routines and created costumes for the tour.

Moon has appeared in eleven of Zombie's solo music videos and an additional four previous to that when he fronted White Zombie. She most famously starred in the Cabinet of Dr. Caligari-themed music video for "Living Dead Girl". Moon appeared on the cover of the single for "Living Dead Girl" (1998), Zombie's remix album American Made Music to Strip By (1999), and the cover of the single for "Demon Speeding" (2002). Aside from Zombie's work, she also appeared in Black Label Society's video for "Stillborn" and Prong's video for "Rude Awakening". In 2003, Moon co-starred in her husband's first feature film, House of 1000 Corpses, as Vera-Ellen "Baby" Firefly, but previous to that, she claims that she had never had aspirations of becoming an actress. As Moon explains her character in that film, "Baby is the angelic-looking bait to get the victims." Moon starred alongside genre actors Sid Haig, Bill Moseley and Karen Black. In 2004, she had a brief appearance in the Tobe Hooper film Toolbox Murders starring Angela Bettis, the only film she has been in not directed by Zombie.

Moon reprised her role as Baby Firefly in the 2005 sequel to House of 1000 Corpses, titled The Devil's Rejects. The Devil's Rejects was financially successful, recouping its roughly $7 million budget during its opening weekend, going on to earn over $16 million and better received by critics than its predecessor. Critic Roger Ebert gave the film three out of a possible four stars. Ebert wrote, "If you are a hardened horror-movie fan capable of appreciating skill and wit in the service of the deliberately disgusting, The Devil's Rejects may exercise a certain strange charm." Moon was awarded Spike TV's Scream Awards award for "Most Vile Villain" alongside co-stars Haig, Moseley and Leslie Easterbrook for their portrayal of the Firefly family. Following that, she was awarded a Fuse/Fangoria Chainsaw Award for best duo with her co-star Moseley.

Moon designed a clothing line, Total Skull, which debuted at the end of May 2006. She explains, "The phrase 'total skull' to me means awesome, rad, the best of the best."

In 2007, Moon starred as Eva Krupp in a short faux trailer segment for the film Grindhouse, directed by Zombie and titled Werewolf Women of the SS. She also appeared in her husband's remake of the 1978 horror classic Halloween, portraying Deborah Myers, the mother of Michael Myers and Laurie Strode. At the time, it was the highest-grossing overall film in the Halloween franchise. Moon reprised her character in the sequel Halloween II, which was released on August 28, 2009. Moon provides the voice for the character of Suzi-X in the animated film The Haunted World of El Superbeasto, written and produced by her husband, Zombie. In 2010, she guest-starred on the series CSI: Miami in the episode "L.A.", which was directed by her husband. She reprised the role of Baby Firefly in the sequel to The Devil's Rejects, 3 from Hell, which was released in September 2019. Fathom events held a 3-day theatrical opening. It is set to appear one final time in theaters before being released on DVD and Blu-ray. Reviews for the film were mixed.

== Personal life ==
On October 31, 2002, after almost nine years of dating, she married heavy metal musician and film director Rob Zombie at the Graceland Wedding Chapel, and subsequently changed her name to Sheri Moon Zombie. As of 2019, she resided with Zombie between a home in Los Angeles and a farm in Connecticut. She is a vegan and animal rights supporter, and houses rescued animals at her Connecticut farm.

== Filmography ==
=== Film ===
Year	Title	Role	Notes
2003	House of 1000 Corpses	Baby Firefly	As Sheri Moon
2004	Toolbox Murders	Daisy Rain	As Sheri Moon
2005	The Devil's Rejects	Baby Firefly	
2007	Grindhouse: Werewolf Women of the SS	Eva Krupp	Short film
2007	Halloween	Deborah Myers	
2009	Halloween II	Deborah Myers	
2009	The Haunted World of El Superbeasto	Suzi-X	Voice role
2012	The Lords of Salem	Heidi La Rock / Adelaide Hawthorne	
2016	31	Charly	
2019	3 from Hell	Baby Firefly	
2022	The Munsters	Lily Munster, Donna Doomley	

=== Television ===
Year	Title	Role	Notes
2008	Californication	Nurse	Episode: "Slip of the Tongue"
2010	CSI: Miami	Olivia Burch	Episode: "L.A."
2009-2022	Cinemassacre's Monster Madness	Herself/Baby Firefly/Deborah Myers/Lily Munster	4 episodes

=== Music videos ===
Year	Title	Role	Artist
1993	"Chains"		His Boy Elroy
1998	"Superbeast"	Woman Riding Motorcycle	Rob Zombie
1998	"Living Dead Girl"	The Living Dead Girl	Rob Zombie
2001	"Feel So Numb"	Mermaid	Rob Zombie
2003	"Stillborn"	Dancing Woman	Black Label Society
2006	"Foxy Foxy"	Herself	Rob Zombie
2013	"Dead City Radio and the New Gods of Supertown"	Dancing Woman	Rob Zombie
2016	"Well, Everybody's Fucking in a U.F.O."	Miss Bunny Peachbottom	Rob Zombie
