= Captain Spaulding (Rob Zombie character) =

Fictional character created by Rob Zombie

- House of 1000 Corpses character
- Captain Spaulding in House of 1000 Corpses (2003)
- First appearance: House of 1000 Corpses (2003)
- Last appearance: 3 from Hell (2019)
- Created by: Rob Zombie
- Portrayed by: Sid Haig

In-universe information
- Full name: Johnny Lee Johns
- Alias: "Cutter"
- Gender: Male
- Spouse: Mama Firefly
- Children: Baby Firefly

Captain Spaulding (born Johnny Lee Johns and also known as "Cutter") is a fictional character created by Rob Zombie. The character first appeared in Zombie's 2003 horror film House of 1000 Corpses, portrayed by Sid Haig. Haig reprised his role as Spaulding in the sequels The Devil's Rejects (2005) and 3 from Hell (2019). Haig also voiced Spaulding in the 2009 animated film The Haunted World of El Superbeasto. The character is depicted as a vulgar and murderous clown.

In House of 1000 Corpses, Spaulding is portrayed as the proprietor of a gas station and fried chicken eatery that also houses a roadside attraction known as Captain Spaulding's Museum of Monsters and Madmen. In The Devil's Rejects, he is revealed to be the patriarch of the Firefly family. The character, and Haig himself, have been called icons of modern horror cinema.

== Fictional character biography ==
Captain Spaulding has a lengthy criminal history, and earned the nickname "Cutter" for stabbing a man to death. Spaulding met Eve Wilson, also known as Mama Firefly, in 1947, and they had a daughter named Vera-Ellen (also known as Baby Firefly). Years later, Spaulding met Otis B. Driftwood and invited him to become a member of their family.

In House of 1000 Corpses, Spaulding is portrayed as the proprietor of a gas station in Texas that also sells fried chicken. The establishment also harbors a roadside haunted house attraction known as Captain Spaulding's Museum of Monsters and Madmen dedicated to serial killers and legends. At the beginning of the film, the establishment is targeted by robbers, whom Spaulding kills. Later in the film, when a group of four people visit his establishment and learn of the local legend of Dr. Satan, Spaulding directs them in the path of the murderous Firefly family. Spaulding's ties to the Firefly clan are kept ambiguous throughout most of the film. At the end, he encounters Denise, one of the people who visited his business earlier, who was the only survivor after the family killed the others. He says he will take her to a hospital, but when she falls asleep, Otis appears and subdues her. Spaulding returns Denise to the family house, where she is presumably killed.

In The Devil's Rejects, Spaulding is revealed to be the patriarch of the Firefly family. In the film's opening sequence, Mama Firefly is taken into custody when the Firefly home is subjected to a search and destroy mission by Sheriff John Wydell and a number of state troopers, but Spaulding is elsewhere during the raid. In prison, Wydell stabs Mama Firefly to death as revenge for the murder of his brother George Wydell, whom she fatally shot in the previous film. Spaulding, Otis, and Baby are eventually captured by Wydell and brought to the Firefly house, where Wydell tortures them. Wydell sets the house on fire and leaves Otis and Spaulding to die, while he hunts Baby for sport outside. Tiny, another member of the Firefly clan, intervenes, killing Wydell and saving the trio. Spaulding, Otis, and Baby escape in a 1972 Cadillac Eldorado belonging to Spaulding's half-brother Charlie Altamont, and are shot by authorities while speeding towards a police barricade.

In 3 from Hell, Spaulding, Otis, and Baby are revealed to have just barely survived the shootout with the police, and are put on trial and imprisoned shortly after their recovery. A decade later, Spaulding gives an interview with the media. While not denying his crimes outright, Spaulding claims he is being used as a scapegoat for society's ills. A decrepit Spaulding is executed by lethal injection sometime later, calmly accepting his fate. This inspires Otis and Baby to escape.

== Development ==
Spaulding was originally supposed to have a bigger role in 3 from Hell, but Sid Haig's real-life health issues stopped him from completing the role as it was written, forcing Zombie to greatly reduce his role.

== Concept and characteristics ==
In the commentary for House of 1000 Corpses, director Rob Zombie describes Spaulding as a "lovable asshole", and ensured that the character's motivations and connection to the Firefly family would be ambiguous in the film. Spaulding is described in the script for House of 1000 Corpses as a "crusty-looking old man in a filthy clown suit and smeared make-up". Just as several characters from the series are named after characters from Marx Brothers films, Spaulding is named for Groucho Marx's character Captain Jeffrey T. Spaulding from the 1930 film Animal Crackers.

== Reception ==
Captain Spaulding has been referred to as a modern icon of horror cinema, and Haig himself has been called a "horror icon" for his portrayal of Spaulding.

In describing Spaulding for his review for The Devil's Rejects, film critic Roger Ebert wrote: "He is a man whose teeth are so bad, they're more frightening than his clown makeup. He plays such a thoroughly disgusting person, indeed, that I was driven to www.sidhaig.com to discover that in real life Sid looks, well, presentable [...] This was a relief to me, because anyone who really looked like Captain Spaulding would send shoppers screaming."

== Bibliography ==
- Bernard, Mark (2014). Selling the Splat Pack: The DVD Revolution and the American Horror Film. Edinburgh University Press. ISBN 978-0748685493.
- Fahy, Thomas, ed. (2012). The Philosophy of Horror. University Press of Kentucky. ISBN 978-0813136554.
- McIver, Joel (2015). Sinister Urge: The Life and Times of Rob Zombie. Backbeat. ISBN 978-1617136160.
