= Sid Haig =

American actor (1939–2019)

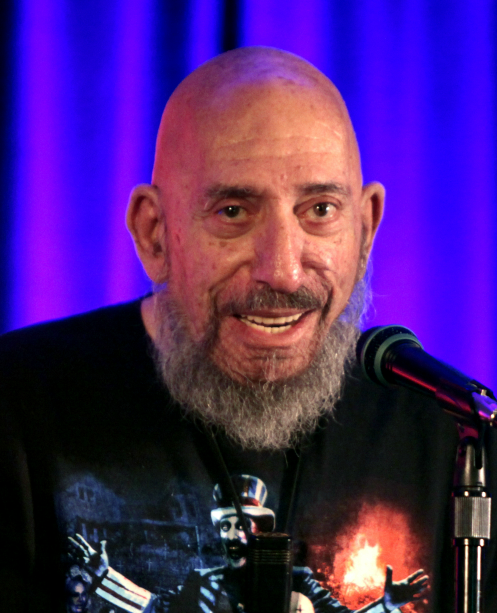
- Haig in 2016
- Born: Sidney Eddie Mosesian; July 14, 1939; Fresno, California, U.S.
- Died: September 21, 2019 (aged 80); Thousand Oaks, California, U.S.
- Education: Pasadena Playhouse
- Occupation: Actor
- Years active: 1960–2019
- Spouse: Susan L. Oberg (m. 2007)
- Children: 2

Sidney Eddie Mosesian (July 14, 1939 – September 21, 2019), known professionally as Sid Haig, was an American actor. He was known for his appearances in horror films, most notably his role as Captain Spaulding in the Rob Zombie films House of 1000 Corpses (2003), The Devil's Rejects (2005), and 3 from Hell (2019). Haig's Captain Spaulding, and Haig himself, have been called icons of horror cinema.

Haig had a leading role on the television series Jason of Star Command as the villain Dragos. He appeared in many television programs, including The Untouchables; Batman; Gunsmoke; Mission: Impossible; Mary Hartman, Mary Hartman; Star Trek; Get Smart; Mannix; The Rockford Files; Charlie's Angels; Fantasy Island; Buck Rogers in the 25th Century; The Dukes of Hazzard; The A-Team; MacGyver; and Emergency!. He also had roles in several of Jack Hill's exploitation films from the 1970s.

== Early life ==
Haig was born in Fresno, California to Armenian parents Roxy (née Mooradian) and Haig Mosesian, an electrician. He was raised in Old Armenia Town, a heavily Armenian-American enclave of Fresno. As a young man, his rapid growth interfered with his motor coordination, prompting him to take dancing lessons. At seven years old, he worked as a paid dancer in a children's Christmas show and later joined a vaudeville revival show. Haig graduated from Fresno's Roosevelt High School, where he was active in the theater department.

Haig was also a musician, playing a wide range of music styles on the drums, including swing, country, jazz, blues and rock and roll. Haig began to earn money from music, and signed a recording contract one year out of high school. Still a teenager, Haig went on to record the single "Full House" with the T-Birds in 1958, which reached No. 4 in the charts.

=== The Pasadena Playhouse ===
While Haig was in high school, the head of the drama department was Alice Merrill, who encouraged him to pursue an acting career. Merrill had been a Broadway actress who had maintained her contacts in the business. During his senior year, a play was produced in which Merrill double cast the show, to have one of her Hollywood friends assess the actors in order to select the final cast.

Dennis Morgan, a musical comedy personality from the 1940s, saw Haig perform, and chose him for a prominent role in the play. Two weeks later, he returned to see the show and advised Haig to continue his education in the San Fernando Valley and to consider acting as a career. Two years later, Haig enrolled in the Pasadena Playhouse, the school that trained such noted actors as Robert Preston, Gene Hackman, and Dustin Hoffman. He later moved to Hollywood with longtime friend and Pasadena Playhouse roommate Stuart Margolin. Dorothy Arzner was one of Haig's instructors, who also introduced him to his oft-collaborator Jack Hill.

== Career ==
Haig's first acting role was in a 1960 short student film titled The Host, directed by Jack Hill at UCLA. This launched Haig's more-than-four-decade acting career in over fifty films and 350 television episodes. Haig became a staple in Hill's films, such as Spider Baby, Coffy and Foxy Brown. He played a henchman in the Lee Marvin-starring crime film Point Blank, and would later work with the actor again in Emperor of the North Pole. In 1971, Haig appeared in THX 1138, the feature film directorial debut of George Lucas, as well as the James Bond film Diamonds Are Forever.

Haig's television debut was a role in a 1962 episode of The Untouchables. He also appeared in a number of other television programs, including Batman, The Man from U.N.C.L.E., Gunsmoke, Mission: Impossible, Star Trek, Get Smart, The Flying Nun, Mary Hartman, Mary Hartman, Emergency!, Charlie's Angels, Jason of Star Command, Fantasy Island, Buck Rogers in the 25th Century, The Dukes of Hazzard, The A-Team, MacGyver, and Just the Ten of Us. He had a leading role on the television series Jason of Star Command, playing the main villain Dragos.

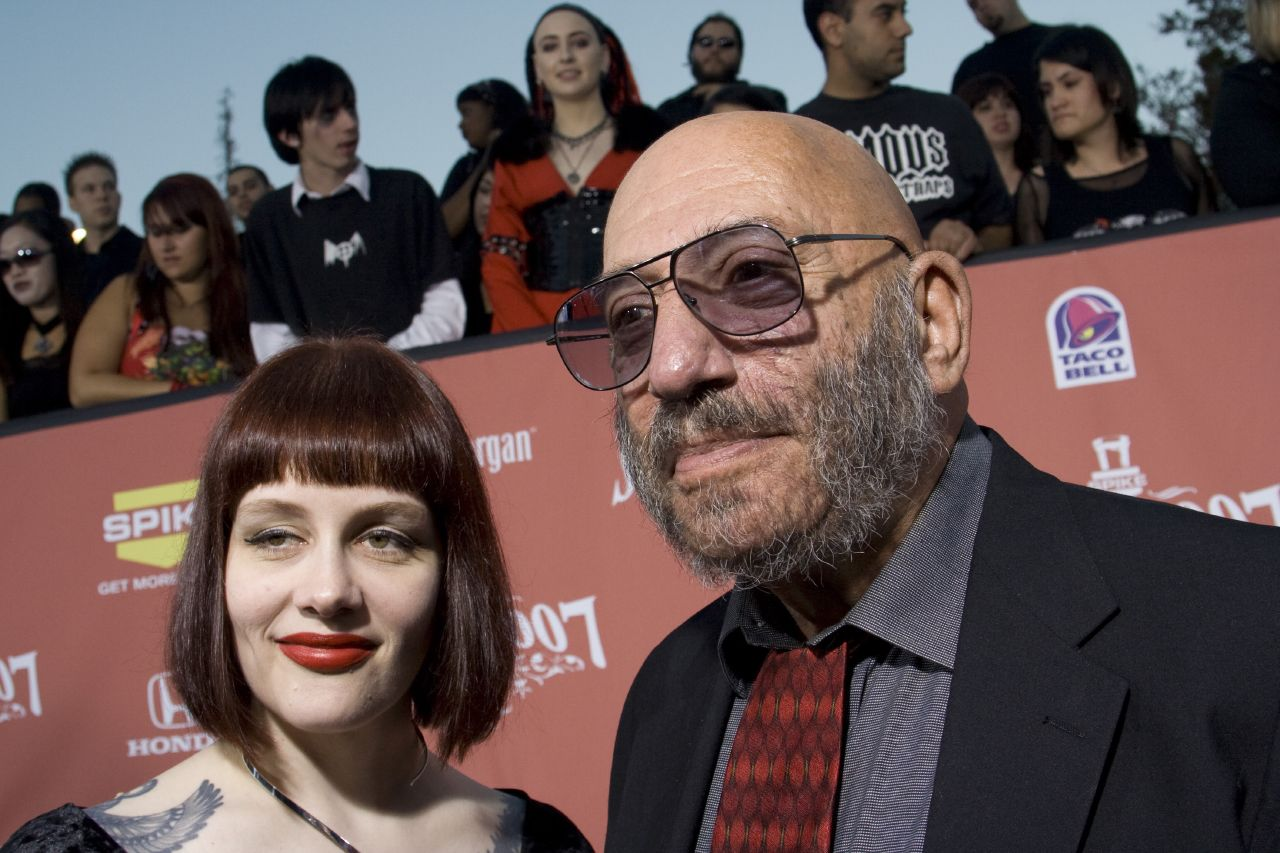
Sid Haig with his wife, Susan L. Oberg, at the 2007 Scream Awards

Haig temporarily retired from acting in 1992, feeling typecast: "I just didn't want to play stupid heavies anymore. They just kept giving me the same parts but just putting different clothes on me. It was stupid, and I resented it, and I wouldn't have anything to do with it". Haig did not work in acting for five years, instead training and becoming a certified hypnotherapist. During this time, he was offered the role of Marsellus Wallace (later to be played by Ving Rhames) in Pulp Fiction, the second feature film directed by Quentin Tarantino. At the time, Haig was concerned that low-budget television had been detrimental to his career and, at seeing the shooting script and the short number of days dedicated for each locale, he reportedly passed on the project; he is said to have later regretted this decision. Haig later appeared as a judge in Tarantino's 1997 film Jackie Brown (starring Haig's oft-costar Pam Grier in the title role), a part written specifically for Haig by Tarantino.

In 2003, Haig starred in Rob Zombie's debut film House of 1000 Corpses, as a psychotic clown named Captain Spaulding. The role revived Haig's acting career, earning him a "Best Supporting Actor" award in the 13th Annual Fangoria Chainsaw Awards, and an induction into Fangoria's Horror Hall of Fame. Haig reprised his role as Spaulding in the 2005 film The Devil's Rejects, a continuation of House of 1000 Corpses, in which Spaulding is portrayed as the patriarch of the murderous Firefly family. Captain Spaulding has since been considered a modern icon of horror cinema, and Haig himself has been called a "horror icon". For his reprisal of the role in The Devil's Rejects, he received the award for "Best Actor" in the 15th Annual Fangoria Chainsaw Awards, and shared the award for "Most Vile Villain" at the First Annual Spike TV Scream Awards with Leslie Easterbrook, Sheri Moon, and Bill Moseley as the Firefly family. Haig was also nominated as "Best Butcher" in the Fuse/Fangoria Chainsaw Awards, but lost to Tobin Bell's Jigsaw from Saw II.

Haig reunited with Rob Zombie for the director's 2007 Halloween remake, with Haig playing the role of cemetery caretaker Chester Chesterfield. He again reprised his role as Captain Spaulding for Zombie's 2009 animated film The Haunted World of El Superbeasto, and appeared in Zombie's 2013 film The Lords of Salem, as well as in the films Hatchet III and Devil in My Ride.

In 2019, Haig appeared as Captain Spaulding for the final time in the Rob Zombie film 3 from Hell, a sequel to House of 1000 Corpses and The Devil's Rejects. He posthumously appeared in the 2020 slasher film Hanukkah, as well as the 2023 film Abruptio.

== Honors ==
Sid Haig was honored with the 3rd Annual Vincent Price Award on August 10, 2019, at Hollywood Horrorfest. Created by festival founder Miles Flanagan and Vincent’s daughter Victoria Price, the award “celebrates Vincent Price’s unique artistic and iconic legacy by honoring an artist whose work has achieved equally iconic status in the horror/fantasy genres.”

Later on Instagram, Haig posted, "On Saturday night August 10th I had the greatest night of my career. I was presented with the Vincent Price Award for Excellence in the Horror Genre. And to make it even more special it was presented to me by Victoria Price, Vincent Price's daughter."

During the event Haig surprised everyone by disclosing he'd actually met Vincent Price in 1962 when a girlfriend invited him on set. "The film she was working on was Tales of Terror. I spent the day with Vincent Price. He was so charming and generous with the time we spent together. He gave me much more of his time than anyone could imagine. We talked about music, art and food, he was a master chef. To be able to spend that much time with him meant the world to me."

The ceremony was a private, invitation-only event and fundraised for the Vincent Price Art Museum. Other award recipients include Joe Dante, Cassandra Peterson, John Landis and Rick Baker.

== Personal life ==
Haig was Roman Catholic. He had two children, Phaedra and Tate. On November 2, 2007, Haig married Susan L. Oberg.

Despite his prominence in horror films and portrayal of villainous characters, Haig was described by his peers as being a "gentle soul."

=== Death ===
In early September 2019, Haig was hospitalised after falling at his home in Thousand Oaks, California. While recovering, he contracted Aspergillus pneumonia after aspirating vomit in his sleep. He died on September 21, 2019, at the age of 80. He was survived by his wife, two children, and two grandchildren.

== Selected filmography ==
=== Film ===
| Year | Title | Role | Director | Notes | Ref(s) |
|---|---|---|---|---|---|
| 1960 | The Host | The Fugitive | Jack Hill | Short film | |
| 1962 | The Firebrand | Diego | Maury Dexter | | |
| 1965 | Beach Ball | Drummer for Righteous Brothers | Lennie Weinrib | Uncredited | |
| 1966 | Blood Bath | Abdul the Arab | Jack Hill and Stephanie Rothman | | |
| 1967 | It's a Bikini World | Daddy | Stephanie Rothman | | |
| 1967 | Point Blank | First Penthouse Lobby Guard | John Boorman | | |
| 1968 | Spider Baby | Ralph Merrye | Jack Hill | | |
| 1968 | The Hell with Heroes | Crespin | Joseph Sargent | | |
| 1969 | Pit Stop | Hawk Sidney | Jack Hill | | |
| 1969 | Che! | Antonio | Richard Fleischer | | |
| 1970 | C.C. and Company | Crow | Seymour Robbie | | |
| 1971 | THX 1138 | NCH | George Lucas | | |
| 1971 | The Big Doll House | Harry | Jack Hill | | |
| 1971 | Diamonds Are Forever | Slumber Inc. Attendant | Guy Hamilton | | |
| 1972 | The Big Bird Cage | Django | Jack Hill | | |
| 1972 | The Woman Hunt | Silas | Eddie Romero | | |
| 1972 | Beware! The Blob | Deputy Ted Sims | Larry Hagman | | |
| 1973 | Black Mama, White Mama | Ruben | Jack Hill | | |
| 1973 | The No Mercy Man | Pill Box | Daniel Vance | | |
| 1973 | Emperor of the North Pole | Grease Tail | Robert Aldrich | | |
| 1973 | Coffy | Omar | Jack Hill | | |
| 1973 | Beyond Atlantis | East Eddie | Eddie Romero | | |
| 1973 | The Don Is Dead | The Arab | Richard Fleischer | | |
| 1974 | Busting | Rizzo's Bouncer | Peter Hyams | | |
| 1974 | Foxy Brown | Hays | Jack Hill | | |
| 1974 | Savage Sisters | Malavael | Eddie Romero | | |
| 1976 | Swashbuckler | Bald Pirate | James Goldstone | | |
| 1978 | Loose Shoes | Lone Stranger | Ira Miller | | |
| 1981 | Underground Aces | Faoud | Robert Butler | | |
| 1981 | Chu Chu and the Philly Flash | Vince | David Lowell Rich | | |
| 1981 | Galaxy of Terror | Quuhod | Bruce D. Clark | | |
| 1982 | The Aftermath | Cutter | Steve Barkett | | |
| 1982 | Forty Days of Musa Dagh | Turkish General | Sarky Mouradian | | |
| 1987 | Commando Squad | Iggy | Fred Olen Ray | | |
| 1988 | Warlords | The Warlord | Fred Olen Ray | | |
| 1989 | Wizards of the Lost Kingdom II | Donar | Charles B. Griffith | | |
| 1990 | The Forbidden Dance | Joa | Greydon Clark | | |
| 1990 | Genuine Risk | Curly | Kurt Voss | | |
| 1997 | Jackie Brown | Judge | Quentin Tarantino | | |
| 2003 | House of 1000 Corpses | Captain Spaulding | Rob Zombie | | |
| 2004 | Kill Bill: Volume 2 | Jay | Quentin Tarantino | | |
| 2004 | Kill Bill: The Whole Bloody Affair | Jay | Quentin Tarantino | | |
| 2005 | The Devil's Rejects | Captain Spaulding / "Cutter" | Rob Zombie | | |
| 2005 | House of the Dead 2 | Professor Roy Curien | Michael Hurst | | |
| 2006 | Little Big Top | Seymour | Ward Roberts | | |
| 2006 | Vampira: The Movie | Himself | Kevin Sean Michaels | Documentary film | |
| 2006 | Night of the Living Dead 3D | Gerald Tovar Jr. | Jeff Broadstreet | | |
| 2007 | Dead Man's Hand | Roy 'The Word' Donahue | Charles Band | | |
| 2007 | Halloween | Chester Chesterfield | Rob Zombie | | |
| 2007 | Brotherhood of Blood | Pashek | Michael Roesch and Peter Scheerer | | |
2009
| 2009 | The Haunted World of El Superbeasto | Captain Spaulding | Rob Zombie | Voice role | |
| 2009 | Dark Moon Rising | Crazy Louis | Dana Mennie | | |
| 2010 | The Black Box | Radio Evangelist | Jonathan Lewis and David Sherbrook | Voice role | |
| 2011 | Creature | Chopper | Fred M. Andrews | | |
| 2012 | The Lords of Salem | Dean Magnus | Rob Zombie | | |
| 2013 | Hatchet III | Abbott McMullen | BJ McDonnell | | |
| 2013 | Devil in My Ride | Iggy | Gary Michael Schultz | | |
| 2013 | The Penny Dreadful Picture Show | Shopkeeper | Eliza Swenson | | |
| 2013 | Zombex | The Commander | Jesse Dayton | | |
| 2015 | Bone Tomahawk | Buddy | S. Craig Zahler | | |
| 2017 | Death House | Icicle Killer | B. Harrison Smith | | |
| 2017 | To Hell and Back: The Kane Hodder Story | Himself | Derek Dennis Herbert | Documentary film | |
| 2018 | Suicide for Beginners | Barry | Craig Thieman | | |
| 2018 | Cynthia | Detective Edwards | Devon Downs and Kenny Gage | | |
| 2019 | High on the Hog | Big Daddy | Tony Wash | | |
| 2019 | 3 from Hell | Captain Spaulding | Rob Zombie | | |
| 2019 | Hanukkah | Judah Lazarus | Eben McGarr | Posthumous release | |
| 2022 | Suicide for Beginners | Barry | Craig Thieman | Posthumous release | |
| 2023 | Abruptio | Sal | Evan Marlowe | Posthumous release; Final film role | |

=== Television ===
| Year | Title | Role | Notes | Ref(s) |
|---|---|---|---|---|
| 1962 | The Untouchables | Augie the Hood | Episode: "The Case Against Eliot Ness" | |
| 1965 | The Lucy Show | The Mummy | Episode: "Lucy and the Monsters" | |
| 1966 | Batman | Royal Apothecary | 2 episodes | |
| 1966–1969 | Gunsmoke | Eli Crawford / Buffalo Hunter / Cawkins / Wade Hansen | 4 episodes | |
| 1966–1970 | Mission: Impossible | Various roles | 9 episodes | |
| 1967 | Star Trek | First Lawgiver | Episode: "The Return of the Archons" | |
| 1967–1970 | Get Smart | Guard / Bruce / Turk | 3 episodes | |
| 1968 | The Flying Nun | Señor Quesada | Episode: "The Return of Father Lundigan" | |
| 1974 | The Rockford Files | B.J. | Episode: Caledonia, it's worth a fortune! | |
| 1975 | Who Is the Black Dahlia? | Tattoo Artist | Television film | |
| 1975 | Emergency! | Spike | 1 episode | |
| 1976 | The Return of the World's Greatest Detective | Vince Cooley | Television film | |
| 1976 | ElectraWoman and DynaGirl | The Genie | Season One Episode 4 : "Ali Baba" | |
| 1976–1977 | Mary Hartman, Mary Hartman | Texas | 55 episodes | |
| 1978 | Charlie's Angels | Reza | Episode: "Diamond in the Rough" | |
| 1978 | Evening in Byzantium | Asied | Television miniseries | |
| 1978–1979 | Jason of Star Command | Dragos | 28 episodes | |
| 1978–1983 | Fantasy Island | Otto / Harlen / Hakeem | 3 episodes | |
| 1979 | Death Car on the Freeway | Maurie | Television film | |
| 1980 | Hart to Hart | Gunther Mattox | Episode: "Murder, Murder On The Wall" | |
| 1980–1981 | Buck Rogers in the 25th Century | Pratt / Spirot | 2 episodes | |
| 1981–1985 | The Fall Guy | Yusef / Arnie / Mr. Fick / Biker | 4 episodes | |
| 1982 | T.J. Hooker | Mountain | Episode: "Hooker's War" | |
| 1982 | The Dukes of Hazzard | Slocum | Episode: "Miz Tisdale on the Lam" | |
| 1983 | The A-Team | Sonny Jenko | Episode: "Black Day at Bad Rock" | |
| 1983 | Automan | 1st Gang Member | Episode: "Pilot" | |
| 1985 | Amazing Stories | Thug | Episode: "Remote Control Man" | |
| 1985–1986 | MacGyver | Khalil / Khan | 2 episodes | |
| 1988 | Goddess of Love | Hephaestus | Television film | |
| 1989–1990 | Just the Ten of Us | Bob | 3 episodes | |
| 1992 | Boris and Natasha: The Movie | Colonel Gorda | Television film | |
| 2018 | Tigtone | Lord Festus | Voice; Episode: "Tigtone and the Pilot" | |
