= The Devil's Rejects =

2005 film by Rob Zombie

- Theatrical release poster
- Directed by: Rob Zombie
- Written by: Rob Zombie
- Based on: Characters by Rob Zombie
- Produced by: Mike Elliott; Andy Gould; Rob Zombie; Michael Ohoven; Marco Mehlitz
- Starring: Sid Haig; Bill Moseley; Sheri Moon Zombie; Ken Foree; Matthew McGrory; William Forsythe
- Cinematography: Phil Parmet
- Edited by: Glenn Garland
- Music by: Tyler Bates
- Production companies: Lions Gate Films; Cinerenta; Cinelamda; Devils Rejects Inc.; Firm Films
- Distributed by: Lions Gate Films (United States); Tiberius Film (Germany)
- Release date: July 22, 2005
- Running time: 109 minutes
- Countries: United States; Germany
- Languages: English; Spanish
- Budget: $7 million
- Box office: $20.9 million

The Devil's Rejects is a 2005 black comedy horror film written, produced and directed by Rob Zombie. It is the second film in the Firefly film series, serving as a sequel to Zombie's 2003 film House of 1000 Corpses, and followed by its own sequel in 2019, 3 from Hell. The film is centered on the three fugitive members of the psychopathic antagonist family from the previous film, acting as the film's villainous protagonists, with Sid Haig, Bill Moseley, and Zombie's wife Sheri Moon Zombie reprising their roles, and Leslie Easterbrook replacing Karen Black as the matriarch.

The Devil's Rejects was released on July 22, 2005, to minor commercial success, and mixed reviews, although it was generally considered an improvement over its predecessor. It was the final film to feature Matthew McGrory before his death the same year, although he did have a posthumous cameo in 2017's The Evil Within, which had been filmed in 2002, and the film's DVD release was dedicated to his "loving memory".

== Plot ==
On May 18, 1978, (Note: Approximately seven months after the events of House of 1000 Corpses (2003)) Texas Sheriff John Quincey Wydell and a large posse of state troopers issue a search and destroy mission on the Firefly family, who are responsible for over 75 homicides and disappearances over the past several years. The family arm themselves and fire on the officers. Rufus is killed, and Mother Firefly is taken into custody while Otis and Baby escape. They steal a car, kill the driver, and go to Kahiki Palms, a run-down motel.

At the motel, Otis and Baby take a musical group called Banjo and Sullivan hostage in their room, and Otis shoots the roadie when he returns. Meanwhile, Baby's father, Captain Spaulding, decides to rendezvous with Baby and Otis. His truck runs out of gas on the way, and he frightens a boy and assaults the boy's mother before stealing her car. Back at the motel, Otis rapes Roy Sullivan's wife, Gloria, and demands Adam Banjo and Roy come with him on an errand. Otis drives his two prisoners to a place where he buried weapons. While walking to the location, the two prisoners attack Otis, but Otis bludgeons Roy and cuts off Adam's face.

At the motel, Adam's wife, Wendy, tries to escape through the bathroom window. When Gloria attempts to rebel, Baby kills her. Wendy runs out of the motel but is caught by Captain Spaulding, who knocks her unconscious. Otis returns, and all three leave the motel together in the band's van. The motel maid comes to clean the room and discovers the murder scene. The maid enters the bathroom, where she sees "The Devil's Rejects" written on the wall in blood; she is startled by Wendy, who is accidentally killed when she runs out to the highway to seek help while she is in shock.

Wydell calls a pair of amoral bounty hunters—the "Unholy Two"—Rondo and Billy Ray, to help him find the Fireflys. While investigating, they discover an associate of Spaulding's named Charlie Altamont. Wydell begins to lose his sanity when Mother Firefly reveals that she murdered his brother. After having a dream in which his brother commands him to avenge his death, Wydell stabs Mother Firefly to death. The surviving Fireflys gather at a brothel owned by Charlie, where he offers them shelter from the police.

After he leaves the brothel, Wydell threatens Charlie to give up the Fireflys. With the help of the "Unholy Two", the sheriff takes the family back to the Firefly house, where Wydell tortures them, using similar methods they used on their victims. He nails Otis' hands to his chair and staples crime-scene photographs to Otis's and Baby's stomachs, then he beats and shocks Captain Spaulding and Otis with a cattle prod and taunts Baby about the death of her mother.

Wydell sets the house on fire and leaves Otis and Spaulding to burn, but he lets Baby loose outside so he can hunt her for sport. Charlie returns to save the Firefly family, but Wydell kills him. Baby gets shot in the calf of her left leg, brutally horse-whipped, and then strangled by Wydell. Tiny suddenly arrives and intervenes, breaking Wydell's neck and saving the Firefly family. Otis, Baby, and Spaulding escape in Charlie's 1972 Cadillac Eldorado and leave behind Tiny, who walks back into the burning house. The trio drives, badly injured. As Otis drives down the road with Baby and Spaulding asleep in the back seat, he notices a police barricade ahead of them. Realizing that they will not make it out alive, he wakes Baby and Spaulding and hands them each a gun. They speed toward the barricade, guns blazing as the police return fire, fading to black as the three are shot several times.

== Cast ==
- Sid Haig as Captain Spaulding / "Cutter"
- Bill Moseley as Otis Driftwood
- Sheri Moon Zombie as Vera-Ellen "Baby" Firefly
- William Forsythe as Sheriff John Quincey Wydell
- Ken Foree as Charlie Altamont
- Matthew McGrory as Tiny Firefly
- Leslie Easterbrook as Mother Firefly
- Dave Sheridan as Officer Ray Dobson
- E. G. Daily as Candy
- Geoffrey Lewis as Roy Sullivan
- Priscilla Barnes as Gloria Sullivan
- Kate Norby as Wendy Banjo
- Lew Temple as Adam Banjo
- Danny Trejo as Rondo
- Diamond Dallas Page as Billy Ray Snapper
- Brian Posehn as Jimmy Cracker
- Ginger Lynn Allen as Fanny
- Tom Towles as George Wydell
- Michael Berryman as Clevon
- P. J. Soles as Susan
- Deborah Van Valkenburgh as Casey
- Jossara Jinaro as Maria
- Chris Ellis as Coggs
- Mary Woronov as Abbie
- Daniel Roebuck as Morris Green
- Duane Whitaker as Dr. Bankhead
- Tyler Mane as Rufus "R.J." Firefly Jr.
- Jordan Orr as Jamie
- Robert Trebor as Marty Walker
- Kane Hodder as gas mask officer
- Rosario Dawson as nurse (deleted scene)

== Production ==
Unused poster featuring Bill Moseley, Sheri Moon Zombie and Sid Haig

When Rob Zombie wrote House of 1000 Corpses (2003), he had a "vague idea for a story" about the brother of the sheriff that the Firefly clan killed coming back for revenge. After Lions Gate Entertainment made back all of their money on the first day of Corpses' theatrical release, they wanted Zombie to make another film and he started to seriously think about a new story. With Rejects, Zombie has said that he wanted to make it "more horrific" and the characters less cartoonish than in Corpses, and that he wanted "to make something that was almost like a violent western. Sort of like a road movie." He has also cited films like Bonnie and Clyde (1967), The Wild Bunch (1969), Badlands (1973) and The Texas Chain Saw Massacre (1974) as influences on Rejects. When he approached William Forsythe about doing the film, he told the actor that the inspiration for how to portray his character came from actors like Lee Marvin and Robert Shaw. Sheri Moon Zombie does not see the film as a sequel: "It's more like some of the characters from House of 1000 Corpses came on over, and now they're the Devil's Rejects."

Zombie hired Phil Parmet, who had shot the documentary Harlan County, USA (1976), because he wanted to adopt a hand-held camera/documentary look. Principal photography was emotionally draining for some of the actors. Moon Zombie remembers a scene she had to do with Forsythe that required her to cry. The scene took two to three hours to film and affected her so much that she did not come into work for two days afterward.

The film went through the MPAA eight times earning an NC-17 rating every time until the last one. According to Zombie, the censors had a problem with the overall tone of the film. Specifically, censors did not like the motel scene between Bill Moseley and Priscilla Barnes, forcing Zombie to cut two minutes of it for the theatrical release. However, this footage was restored in the unrated DVD release.

== Soundtrack ==
Zombie, who is also a musician, decided to go with more southern rock to create the mood of the film. The film's soundtrack itself was notable as being one of the first to be released on DualDisc, with the DVD side featuring a making-of featurette for the film and a photo gallery. In 2019, Zombie announced that Waxwork Records would release the soundtrack on vinyl along with the two other Zombie films in the trilogy, House of 1,000 Corpses and 3 from Hell (2019). The record included an essay written by director Rob Zombie and a 12x12" booklet that contained behind the scenes photographs.

== Reception ==
=== Box office ===
The Devil's Rejects was released by Lions Gate Films on July 22, 2005, in 1,757 theaters and grossed US$7.1 million on its opening weekend, recouping its roughly US$7 million budget. It grossed US$17 million in North America and US$2.3 million internationally for a total of US$19.4 million.

=== Critical response ===
The film received mixed reviews from critics. On Rotten Tomatoes, the film has an approval rating of 54% rating based on 135 reviews, with an average rating of 5.8/10. The site's consensus reads: "Zombie has improved as a filmmaker since House of 1000 Corpses and will please fans of the genre, but beware—the horror is nasty, relentless and sadistic." On Metacritic, the film has a weighted average score of 53 out of 100 based on reviews from 32 critics, indicating "mixed or average reviews". Audiences polled by CinemaScore gave the film an average grade of "B−" on an A+ to F scale.

Critic Roger Ebert enjoyed the film and gave it three out of four stars. He wrote, "There is actually some good writing and acting going on here, if you can step back from the [violent] material enough to see it." Later, in his 2006 review for the horror film The Hills Have Eyes, Ebert referenced The Devil's Rejects, writing, "I received some appalled feedback when I praised Rob Zombie's The Devil's Rejects, but I admired two things about it [that were absent from The Hills Have Eyes]: (1) It desired to entertain and not merely to sicken, and (2) its depraved killers were individuals with personalities, histories and motives." In his review for Rolling Stone, Peter Travers gave The Devil's Rejects three out of four stars and wrote, "Let's hear it for the Southern-fried soundtrack, from Buck Owens' 'Satan's Got to Get Along Without Me' to Lynyrd Skynyrd's 'Free Bird', playing over the blood-soaked finale, which manages to wed The Wild Bunch to Thelma & Louise." Richard Roeper gave the film "thumbs up" for being successful at its goal to be the "sickest, the most twisted, the most deranged movie" at that point of the year (2005).

In her review for The New York Times, Dana Stevens wrote that the film "is a trompe-l'œil experiment in deliberately retro film-making. It looks sensational, but there is a curious emptiness at its core." Entertainment Weekly gave the film a "C+" rating and wrote, "Zombie's characters are, to put it mildly, undeveloped." Robert K. Elder, of the Chicago Tribune, disliked the film, writing "[D]espite decades of soaking in bloody classics such as the original Texas Chainsaw Massacre and I Spit on Your Grave, Zombie didn't absorb any of the underlying social tension or heart in those films. He's no collage artist of influences, like Quentin Tarantino, crafting his movie from childhood influences. Rejects plays more like a junkyard of homages, strewn together and lost among inept cops, gaping plot holes and buzzard-ready dialog."

Horror author Stephen King rated The Devil's Rejects the 9th best film of 2005 and wrote, "No redeeming social merit, perfect '70s C-grade picture cheesy glow; this must be what Quentin Tarantino meant when he did those silly Kill Bill pictures."

James Berardinelli was very negative giving The Devil's Rejects half a star (out of a possible four stars) and called it a "vile, reprehensible movie", saying the action was "more formula than plot". He described the dialogue as "a pastiche (at least I think that's the intention) of the kind of bloodthirsty, overripe lines found" in a genre of films from the 1970s about "outcasts who defy society by destroying it". He was extremely critical of the acting, directing, and the production values, with an ending that was "a cataclysmic misfire", and overall was not "engaging cinema".

In 2015, Taste of Cinema ranked the film 23rd among the "30 Great Psychopath Movies That Are Worth Your Time". In 2025, Quentin Tarantino selected The Devil's Rejects for his list of the "Top 20 Best Films of the 21st Century".

=== Awards ===
Award	Category	Nominee	Result
Fangoria Chainsaw Awards	Best Wide-Release Film		Won
Fangoria Chainsaw Awards	Killer Movie (Scariest Film)	Rob Zombie	Won
Fangoria Chainsaw Awards	Best Screenplay	Rob Zombie	Won
Fangoria Chainsaw Awards	Best Actor	Sid Haig	Won
Fangoria Chainsaw Awards	Best Supporting Actor	William Forsythe	Won
Fangoria Chainsaw Awards	Best Supporting Actress	Leslie Easterbrook	Won
Fangoria Chainsaw Awards	Best Score	Tyler Bates	Won
Fangoria Chainsaw Awards	Best Villain	Sid Haig	Nominated
Fangoria Chainsaw Awards	Relationship from Hell	Bill Moseley and Sheri Moon Zombie	Won
Fangoria Chainsaw Awards	Line That Killed (Best One-Liner)	Bill Moseley	Nominated
Satellite Awards	Outstanding Classic DVD	Unrated Widescreen Edition	Nominated
Scream Awards	The Ultimate Scream		Nominated
Scream Awards	Best Horror Movie		Won
Scream Awards	Most Vile Villain	Leslie Easterbrook, Sid Haig, Bill Moseley and Sheri Moon Zombie as the Firefly family	Won
Rondo Hatton Classic Horror Awards	Best Film	Rob Zombie	Nominated
Golden Schmoes Awards	Best Horror Movie of the Year	Rob Zombie	Nominated

== Sequel ==
In January 2018, it was rumored that a sequel, 3 from Hell, was in production. Rob Zombie confirmed this via Instagram in March 2018, sharing a photo from the director's seat. A teaser trailer for 3 from Hell was released in June 2019, and the film opened on September 16, 2019.
