= Waxwork Records =

Independent record label

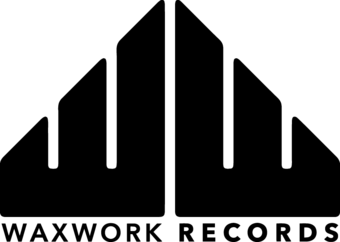
- Genre: Soundtracks; Film scores
- Founded: 2013; 13 years ago
- Founders: Kevin Bergeron; Sue Ellen Soto
- Headquarters: New Orleans, Louisiana, United States
- Website: waxworkrecords.com

Waxwork Records is an American independent record label. It has released film scores and movie soundtracks on vinyl as well as comics.

== History ==
Waxwork Records was founded in 2013 by Kevin Bergeron and Sue Ellen Soto. By 2015, it had re-released vinyl scores for horror films such as Day of the Dead, Creepshow, and Chopping Mall. It also released a blood-filled vinyl collection for Harry Manfredini's Friday the 13th soundtrack. In 2016, it released House of Waxwork, the first comic book from its Waxwork Comics line.
