= Christopher Stone (actor) =

American actor (1940–1995)

- Stone in 1977
- Born: Thomas Edward Bourassa; October 4, 1940; Manchester, New Hampshire, U.S.
- Died: October 20, 1995 (aged 55); Los Angeles, California, U.S.
- Occupation: Actor
- Years active: 1968–1994
- Height: 6 ft 0 in (1.83 m)
- Spouse: Dee Wallace (m. 1980)
- Children: Gabrielle Stone

Christopher Stone (born Thomas Edward Bourassa; October 4, 1940 – October 20, 1995) was an American actor.

== Early life ==
Stone was born Thomas Edward Bourassa in Manchester, New Hampshire.

== Career ==
He appeared in films and on television from the early 1970s until his death in 1995. Stone and his wife, Dee Wallace, appeared together in a number of films including the classic horror films The Howling (1981) and Cujo (1983). They shared top billing in the family series The New Lassie (1989), in which he sometimes served as director.

Stone guest-starred in the Galactica 1980 episode "Galactica Discovers Earth", and in the Buck Rogers in the 25th Century episode "Space Vampire". He played Col. Marty Vidor, alias "Bo-Dai Thung", in the 1984 Airwolf episode "And They Are Us". In 1983, he guest-starred in The Dukes Of Hazzard sixth-season episode "Brotherly Love" as crooked gambler Tex Tompkins.

Other TV credits include guest roles in series such as Fantasy Island, Riptide (second-season episode "Catch of the Day" (1984), and The A-Team (third-season episode "Incident at Crystal Lake" (1985). He also was a guest star on The Bionic Woman in a first-season episode "Fly Jaime"; and then became Jaime Sommers' love interest in four episodes: "The Pyramid", "The Antidote", "Sanctuary Earth" and "On the Run"; in the third season.

Stone and his wife Dee Wallace also appeared together in Cujo (1983), Legend of the White Horse (1987), and Runaway Daughters (1994), a made-for-TV loose remake of the 1956 film.

== Personal life ==
Stone dated actress Susan Tolsky for five years after meeting in the late 1960s. Stone's first two wives were: Grethe Jepsen (September 11, 1965 - January 1968--divorced); Carole Stone (December 19, 1975--divorced on an unknown date). He and Carole appeared on five episodes of Tattletales in June, 1976. Stone married actress Dee Wallace in 1980; they worked on several projects together before their daughter Gabrielle Stone was born in 1988.

== Death ==
Stone died of a heart attack on October 20, 1995.

== Filmography ==
=== Film ===
Year	Title	Role	Notes
1970	The Grasshopper	Jay Rigney	
1973	Love Me Deadly	Wade Farrow	
1977	Warhead	Ben-David	
1981	The Howling	R. William "Bill" Neill	
1982	The Junkman	Michael Fox	
1983	Cujo	Steve Kemp	
1984	The Shepherd	Major Lyle Martin	
1985	The Annihilators	Bill	
1987	Legend of the White Horse	'Doc' Westmore	
1988	Blue Movies	Brad	
1993	Alone in the Dark	Mr. Wahl	Short
1994	Huck and the King of Hearts	Russ	
1996	Invisible Mom	Col. Jerry Cutter	Final film role

=== Television ===
Year	Title	Role	Notes
1968	The Outcasts	Tom Jeremy	Episode: "Three Ways to Die"
1968–1969	Here Come the Brides	Hart / Dutch / Corky	3 episodes
1968–1972	The F.B.I.	Alex Van Heusen / Dave Palmer	2 episodes
1969	Mod Squad	Holly Anders	Episode: "A Place to Run, a Heart to Hide In"
1969	Medical Center	Dr. Steve Seagren	Episode: "The Adversaries"
1970–1971	The Interns	Dr. Pooch Hardin	24 episodes
1971	This Is the Life	Randy Wilson	Episode: "The Football Player"
1971	Mission: Impossible	Mike Saunders	Episode: "Shape-Up"
1971	Love, American Style	Jerry	Episode: "Love and the Bashful Groom"
1971	Marcus Welby, M.D.		Episode: "A Yellow Bird"
1978–1982	Fantasy Island	Andre / Tom Dearborne	2 episodes
1972	Cade's County	Jess Pritchard	Episode: "The Brothers"
1972	Wheeler and Murdoch	Terry Murdoch	Television film
1972–1976	The Streets of San Francisco	Officer Todd Harris / Jim Danielson / Josh Evans	3 episodes
1973	The Magician	Gary Allmont	Episode: "Nightmare in Steel"
1973–1978	Barnaby Jones	Jack / Father Sean Williams / Don Brody	4 episodes
1974	Cannon	Rick Adante	Episode: "Where's Jennifer?"
1974	Chopper One	Larry	Episode: "The Copperhead"
1974	Nakia	Otis	Episode: "Pilot"
1974	The Manhunter	Rick Collins	Episode: "Jackknife"
1975	Ladies of the Corridor	Harry	Television film
1975	Three for the Road	Frank	Episode: "Fear"
1975	Police Woman	Marty Bowen	Episode: "The Score"
1975	Medical Story	Mickey Barnes	Episode: "The Moonlight Heater"
1975–1976	Police Story	Arley Gentry / Sgt. Bob Hyland	2 episodes
1976	Spencer's Pilots	Cass Garrett	11 episodes
1976–1978	The Bionic Woman	Chris Williams / Marlow	5 episodes
1977	Hunter	Condon	Episode: "The Lysenko Syndrome"
1977	Kingston: Confidential	Chris	Episode: "Golden Girl"
1977	Logan's Run	David Pera	Episode: "Crypt"
1977	Mulligan's Stew	Brian	Episode: "Winning the Big Ones"
1978	Wonder Woman	Ryan	Episode: "Light-fingered Lady"
1978	Black Beauty	Peter Blantyre	Miniseries
1978	The American Girls		Episode: "Firefly"
1978	The Eddie Capra Mysteries	Troy Nichols	Episode: "How Do I Kill Thee?"
1978	David Cassidy: Man Undercover	Sgt. Ostrow	Episode: "Flashpoint"
1979	Having Babies	Jim	Episode: "Sisters"
1979	CHiPs	Dennis	Episode: "Death Watch"
1979	Vega$	Brad Sumner	Episode: "The Day the Gambling Stopped"
1979	Eischied	Ted Lujack	Episode: "Friday's Child"
1980	Buck Rogers in the 25th Century	Space Station Commander Royko	Episode: "Space Vampire"
1980	Galactica 1980	Major Stockwell	2 episodes
1980	The Misadventures of Sheriff Lobo	Jack	Episode: "Perkins Bombs Out"
1981	Secrets of Midland Heights	Mike Grey	Episode: "The Race"
1981–1984	Dallas	Dave Stratton	9 episodes
1982	Strike Force		Episode: "Deadly Chemicals"
1982	Harper Valley PTA	Tom Meecham	Episode: "Harper Valley Sentinel"
1982	The Fall Guy	Abel Allen	Episode: "Scavenger Hunt"
1982	Father Murphy	Samuel Clemens	Episode: "Stopover in a One-Horse Town"
1982	The Blue and the Gray	Major Fairburn	Miniseries, 3 episodes
1983	The Dukes of Hazzard	Tex Tompkins	Episode: "Brotherly Love"
1983	Manimal	Ross	Episode: "Illusion"
1983	Whiz Kids	Mark Travers	Episode: "Red Star Rising"
1984	Matt Houston	Carl	Episode: "The Secret Admirer"
1984	Airwolf	Colonel Martin James Vidor	Episode: "And They Are Us"
1984	Riptide	Captain Chuck Reavis	Episode: "Catch of the Day"
1984	Cover Up		Episode: "A Subtle Seduction"
1984–1985	Simon & Simon	Arthur Kayden / Randy Dever - Club Owner	2 episodes
1984–1987	Remington Steele	Nine O'Clock / Cowboy	2 episodes
1985	The A-Team	Gavin	Episode: "Incident at Crystal Lake"
1985	T. J. Hooker	Det. Max Brodsky	Episode: "Death is a Four Letter Word"
1985–1989	Murder, She Wrote	Adam Frobisher	2 episodes
1986	The New Mike Hammer	Lloyd Carmody	Episode: "Dead Pigeon"
1986	MacGyver	Curry	Episode: "Eagles"
1986	Shattered If Your Kid's on Drugs		Television film
1987	Newhart	Mel Donner	Episode: "Much to Do Without Muffin"
1987–1988, 1994	Days of Our Lives	Bill Horton #3	75 episodes
1989	Hunter	Alan Sharr	Episode: "The Pit"
1989–1992	The New Lassie	Chris McCullough	36 episodes
1993	Dying to Remember	Dan Corso	Television film
1994	Rebel Highway	Mr. Gordon	Episode: "Runaway Daughters"
1994	Sweet Justice	Coach Townsend	Episode: "Fourth Quarter"
