= See No Evil =

See No Evil is part of the adage "see no evil, hear no evil, speak no evil."

See No Evil may also refer to:

== Books ==
- See No Evil (Baer book), a 2003 book by former CIA case officer Robert Baer
- See No Evil (The Hardy Boys), a 1987 Hardy Boys Casefiles novel
- See No Evil - The Backstage Battle Over Sex and Violence on Television, by Geoffrey Cowan, 1979
- See No Evil: The Existence of Sin in an Age of Relativism, by Harry Lee Poe, 2004

== Film ==
- See No Evil (1971 film), a 1971 movie
- See No Evil (2006 film), a 2006 movie starring Glen "Kane" Jacobs
  - See No Evil 2, its 2014 sequel

== Television ==
- See No Evil: The Moors Murders, a 2006 British drama serial about Myra Hindley and Ian Brady, the Moors Murderers
- "See No Evil" (Homicide: Life on the Street), a 1994 second season episode of Homicide: Life on the Street
- "See No Evil" (Batman: The Animated Series), an episode from the first season of Batman: The Animated Series
- "See No Evil", an episode of My Life as a Teenage Robot
- "See No Evil" (NCIS), the second season premiere of NCIS
- "See No Evil" (Haven), the fifth season premiere of Haven
- See No Evil, a 2014 series on the Investigation Discovery Network

== Other uses ==
- See No Evil (artwork), a 2011 collection of works of public art in Bristol, UK
- "See No Evil", a track from the 1977 album Marquee Moon by Television
- See No Evil, a six song EP from rock band Grasshopper Takeover

== See also ==
- Speak No Evil (disambiguation)
- Hear No Evil (disambiguation)
- 3 Monkeys (disambiguation), associated with the adage
