= Don't Speak (disambiguation) =

"Don't Speak" is a 1996 song by the American band No Doubt.

Don't Speak may also refer to:

- Don't Speak, English translation of the Chinese pen name of the Chinese writer Mo Yan
- "Don't Speak", a song by Everglow on their 2021 EP Return of The Girl
- "Don't Speak", a song by the Jonas Brothers, on their 2009 album Lines, Vines and Trying Times
- "Don't Speak", a song by Meshuggah, on their 2001 album Rare Trax
- "Don't Speak (I Came to Make a BANG!)", a song by Eagles of Death Metal, on their 2006 album Death by Sexy
- "Don't Speak", a song by Wet Leg, on their 2025 album Moisturizer
- Don't Speak, a 2020 horror film directed by Scott Jeffrey

== See also ==
- Speak No Evil
