= Zombie Killers: Elephant's Graveyard =

- Film poster
- Directed by: B. Harrison Smith
- Written by: B. Harrison Smith and David Agnew Penn
- Produced by: B. Harrison Smith
- Starring: Billy Zane; Dee Wallace; Mischa Barton; Felissa Rose; Gabrielle Stone
- Production company: Class of 85
- Release date: 3 February 2015
- Running time: 104 minutes
- Country: United States
- Language: English

Zombie Killers: Elephant's Graveyard is a 2015 zombie horror film directed by B. Harrison Smith and starring Billy Zane, Dee Wallace, Mischa Barton, Felissa Rose, and Gabrielle Stone. It was released on video by Anchor Bay Entertainment on February 3, 2015.

== Plot ==
There are only a few of the living left in the zombie infested planet. In the town of Elwood, young people are trained by an ex-soldier to fight zombies with paintballs. When Elwood is running out of provisions, they must battle through the zombies to get more food and paintballs.

== Production ==
The film went into post-production in 2013. Its special effects were created by Toby Sells, who has also done work for the television series The Walking Dead. The writer and director B. Harrison Smith said of the production, "The goal was to integrate the paintball aspect organically, so that it made sense".

== Release ==
It was released unrated and direct to video on Blu-ray and DVD. The video release includes three special features—a video from the YouTube channel Bloodbath & Beyond with the users on the site of the film, a look at the film's productions, and a behind the scenes look. None of the special features are in high definition. It has a 1080p HD transfer that has a 2.35:1 aspect ratio and a Dolby TrueHD 5.1 audio mix. The subtitles are in English and Spanish.

The film had a showing at the USC School of Cinematic Arts.

== Reception ==
Staci Layne Wilson, writing for Dread Central, praised the acting and the effects, but said that "the lackluster plot and shaky-cam cinematography are bound to have more viewers diving for the fast-forward button early on, skipping to the end and not missing a thing in-between".

Martin Liebman, of Blu-ray.com, wrote, "Zombie Killers: Elephant's Graveyard is a film that tries too hard and ends up lacking the tighter cohesion necessary to tell a better, richer story". High-Def Digest's Bryan Kluger wrote, "Zombie Killers: Elephant's Graveyard lacks any real sense of direction, horror, and gore. It also tries too hard to be something more than it actually is".
