= Speak No Evil =

Speak No Evil is a phrase from the "see no evil, hear no evil, speak no evil" adage. It may refer to:

== Film ==
- Speak No Evil (2013 film), an American horror film
- Speak No Evil (2022 film), a Danish-Dutch psychological thriller film
- Speak No Evil (2024 film), a remake of the 2022 film

== Radio and television ==
=== Episodes ===
- "Speak No Evil", Anacostia season 5, episode 6 (2017)
- "Speak No Evil", Angela Anaconda season 3, episode 13b (2001)
- "Speak No Evil", Batman Beyond, season 3, episode 4 (2000)
- "Speak No Evil", Billy the Cat season 2, episode 26 (2001)
- "Speak No Evil", Bonanza season 10, episode 28 (1969)
- "Speak No Evil", Diff'rent Strokes season 8, episode 9 (1985)
- "Speak No Evil", Haven season 5, episode 2 (2014)
- "Speak No Evil", Ironside (1967) season 8, episode 12 (1974)
- "Speak No Evil", My Life as a Teenage Robot season 1, episode 5b (2003)
- "Speak No Evil", Shazam! season 2, episode 6 (1975)
- "Speak No Evil", Sky King season 1, episode 2 (1952)
- "Speak No Evil", Thunder Alley season 2, episode 2 (1994)
- "Speak No Evil", The Young Riders season 1, episode 4 (1989)

=== Shows ===
- Speak No Evil (play), a 1980 radio play by Juliet Ace
- Speak No Evil, a 2005 BBC television documentary discussing the 1988–1994 British broadcasting voice restrictions

== Literature ==
- Speak No Evil (Eberhart novel), a 1941 mystery by Mignon G. Eberhart
- Speak Not Evil, a 1958 novel by Edwin Lanham
- Speak No Evil, a 1988 novel by Graham Farrow
- Speak No Evil, a 1990 novel by Jahnna N. Malcolm; the third installment in the Hart & Soul series
- Speak No Evil, a 1993 novel by Philip Caveney
- Speak No Evil, a 1996 novel by Rochelle Krich
- Speak No Evil, a 2007 novel by Allison Brennan; the first installment in the No Evil trilogy
- Speak No Evil, a 2010 novel by Marilyn Kaye; the sixth installment in the Gifted series
- Speak No Evil, a 2013 novel by Tanya Anne Crosby
- Speak No Evil (Iweala novel), a 2018 novel by Uzodinma Iweala

== Music ==
- Speak No Evil (Wayne Shorter album), 1966, or the title track
- Speak No Evil (Buddy Rich album), 1976
- Speak No Evil (Flora Purim album), 2003
- Speak No Evil (Tinsley Ellis album), 2009
- Speak No Evil, an album by Pinmonkey, 2002
- "Speak No Evil" (song), by Dragon, 1985

== See also ==
- Three wise monkeys
- See No Evil (disambiguation)
- Hear No Evil (disambiguation)
- 3 Monkeys (disambiguation), associated with the adage
