= Legend of the White Horse =

1987 film

- Directed by: Jerzy Domaradzki; Janusz Morgenstern
- Screenplay by: Robert C. Fleet
- Edited by: Krzysztof Osiecki
- Release date: 1987
- Countries: Poland; United States

Legend of the White Horse (original title: Biały smok, lit. White Dragon) is a 1987 Polish-American adventure children's film directed by Jerzy Domaradzki and Janusz Morgenstern, based on the magic realism novel White Horse, Dark Dragon by Robert C. Fleet, who also wrote the screenplay. It was produced by Alina Szpak for CBS Theatrical Films, Legend Productions & Film Polski. The film is also a political satire. It was released on July 13, 1987. It was re-released in 2017 by Legend 44 Productions as White Horse, Dark Dragon; Legend 44 Productions is the successor to Legend Productions, the American co-producer and copyright holder of the feature.

== Plot ==
The action takes place in a fictional Central European country, Karistan, where the beautiful Alta lives with her young blind daughter Jewel. Jewel has a friend in the form of an enigmatic white horse. Soon they meet an American visitor named Jim Martin, who has been sent to Karistan to prove that a new investment is not going to harm the environment in Karistan.

== Cast ==
- Christopher Lloyd ... Jim Martin
- Stephan Szpak-Fleet (as aka Stephan aka Stephan Fleet) ... Steve Martin
- Dee Wallace ... Alta
- Allison Balson ... Jewel
- Soon-Tek Oh ... Tai Ching
- Kazimierz Kaczor ... The Superintendent
- Christopher Stone ... Doc
- Archie Lee Simpson ... Silver
- Luke Askew ... Frank Brown
- Zbigniew Lesien ... Peter
- Stanislaw Wolski ... Johann
- Zdzislaw Sosnierz ... Georgi
- Andrzej Blumenfeld ... Bartan
- Ryszard Radwanski
- Andrzej Szopa
- Agata Piszczorowicz
- Ann Carol Vanex
- Robert C. Fleet
- Andrzej Krakowski
- Janina Januszkiewicz ... Stewardess

== Background ==
The novel White Horse, Dark Dragon is described by The Science Fiction Chronicle as "an interesting juxtaposition of fantasy and modern politics", and has become something of a cult due to its dry political humor satirizing late-era communism and U.S. corporate boardrooms - mixed with action, historical romance and nuanced characters. The movie takes a simpler tack, perhaps reflective of Hollywood mind-think: good guys vs. bad guys. It was a decision that makes for an uneasy blend of target marketing vs. reality, since the result was a movie that at least one reviewer, Michael Medved, thought was "too intense for children."

As Biały smok (White Dragon), it was the second highest grossing theatrical feature in Poland when it was released in 1987. It was renamed "Legend of the white horse" by CBS in the U.S., but the CBS Theatrical Films division was closed down in late 1986 and the feature languished in tax write-off obscurity until it was released to video by CBS/Fox Video a few years later.

The book was held up for publication for contractual reasons, but finally published by Putnam/Berkley/Ace in 1993. It was re-released in digital and print versions in 2012 by Red Frog Publishing.

== History of the production ==
Polish-born U.S. producer Alina Szpak, using her recently completed family feature, Brothers of the Wilderness, as an entrée to return to Poland, and with the aim of helping to ease the thaw of Cold War relations as the country was just coming out of martial law, in 1984 she and her husband/partner Robert Fleet approached the country's official film agency, Film Polski and, in co-operation with Film Unit Perspektywa (Zespoł Perspectywa) developed the first U.S.-Poland feature film co-production (not services-for-hire), producing White Dragon (aka Biały Smok aka Legend of the White Horse aka White Horse, Dark Dragon) for her own company, Legend Productions under the aegis White Dragon Productions, Inc. The fantasy-adventure feature, valued at a 1985 budget of US$11 million and starring American and Polish actors (Christopher Lloyd, Dee Wallace, Soon-Tek Oh, Kazimierz Kaczor), was purchased in pre-production by CBS Theatrical Productions. Released in 1987 in Poland, it was the #2 grossing theatrical film of the year, after E.T. In the U.S., although White Dragon had already been pre-sold to 100 international markets during production in 1985-86, a corporate takeover of CBS by Laurence Tisch resulted in the entire feature film division being closed; the feature was subsequently renamed Legend of the White Horse and sold via Fox Video; due to a settlement with CBS, it is currently under digital distribution by Legend 44 as White Horse, Dark Dragon.

== Reception ==
In Poland Dorota Malinowska reviewed it for Fantastyka (10/87, s. 64).
