= 3 Monkeys =

3 Monkeys or Three Monkeys may refer to:

- Three wise monkeys, pictorial maxim, embodying "see no evil, hear no evil, speak no evil", also associated with Mahatma Gandhi
- Three Monkeys (film), a 2008 Turkish film
- 3 Monkeys (2020 film), a 2020 Indian Telugu-language comedy drama film
- 3 Monkeys (2026 film), a 2026 Indian Hindi-language heist thriller film

== See also ==
- See No Evil (disambiguation)
- Speak No Evil (disambiguation)
- Hear No Evil (disambiguation)
