= Gabrielle Stone =

American actress, author, director (b. 1988)

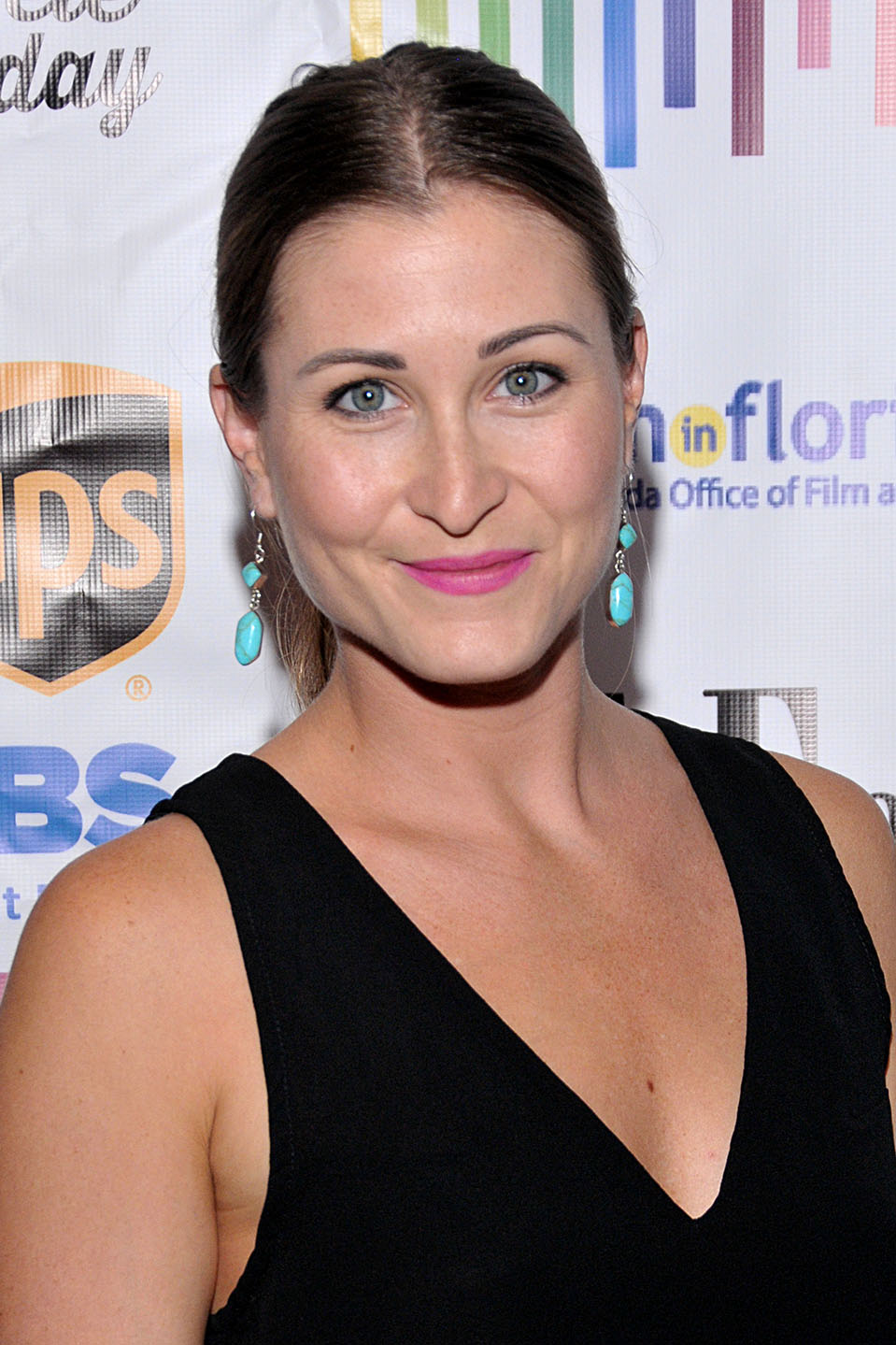
- Stone at the LA Femme Film Festival in 2015
- Occupations: Actress; author; dancer
- Years active: 2006–present
- Children: 1

Gabrielle Stone is an American author, actress, dancer and director known for movies and television series such as Speak No Evil and Cut. She has worked with actors Billy Zane, Mischa Barton, and her mother Dee Wallace in Zombie Killers: Elephant's Graveyard.

== Biography ==
While growing up in Los Angeles, California, Gabrielle Stone studied dance. Stone studied at the Ciara Dance studio in Woodland Hills, California where she is an alumna with more than 18 years of experience.

== Filmography ==
=== Film ===
| Year | Title | Role | Notes |
|---|---|---|---|
| 2006 | Henry John and the Little Bug | Florence Tildon | |
| 2010/I | The Guardian | Nurse | |
| 2011 | Sugartown | Sara Tilps | |
| 2011 | 869 | Desiree | |
| 2012 | The Lighthouse | Carrie | |
| 2012 | Fuzz Track City | Waitress | |
| 2012/I | Beyond | Jane | |
| 2012 | An Old Man's Gold | Charlene Sullivan | |
| 2013 | Speak No Evil | Anna | |
| 2013 | Cut! | Gabby | |
| 2014 | The Jazz Funeral | Jennifer | |
| 2014 | Once, When I Was Dead | Amelia | |
| 2014 | Zombie Killers: Elephant's Graveyard | Nikki Slater | |
| 2014/I | Grief | Sarah | |
| 2014 | Flytrap | Ginger | |
| 2015/I | Stray | Jennifer Davis | |
| 2015/II | Dead Quiet | Marie | |
| 2014 | A Place Called Hollywood | Annie Clarke | |
| 2015 | Flowers in December | Holly | |
| 2015 | The Legacy of Avril Kyte | Avril | |
| 2015 | The French American | Maloul | |
| 2016 | Ava's Impossible Things | Depression | |
| 2016 | $elfie Shootout | FBI Clerk | |
| 2017 | Death House | Linz Haddon | |
| 2017 | Rock Paper Dead | Barbara | |
| 2018 | The Competition | Ashley | |
| 2019 | Swell | Vera | |

=== Television ===
| Year | Title | Role | Notes |
|---|---|---|---|
| 2006 | Wooden Steel Comedy | Various | |
| 2010 | MKP Celebrity Talk | Guest | |
| 2011 | The Quarter Lifers | Lani | |
| 2012 | Proper Manors | Holly Olden | |
