= Guy Nardulli =

American actor (born 1974)

Gaetano Marco "Guy" Nardulli (born May 31, 1974) is an American actor.

== Early life ==
Nardulli was born in Norridge, Illinois. He went to Ridgewood H.S, then was a collegiate football player for Elmhurst College and a two-time All-American for the Bluejay football team. He traveled to Italy and played football professionally in the Italian Football League with the Bolzano Giants during the 1996/97 seasons. He returned to the States and played on the Regional Football League with the Ohio Cannons and then the Quad City Steamwheelers during the 1998 season and returned to his hometown to play with Chicago Thunder Football League. He later joined the Chippendales dance troupe and then made his way into the acting industry, auditioning for roles in television and film.

== Career ==
Nardulli is well known for his "strong-arm" portrayals as detective and law enforcement characters, military, mobster and criminal roles in movies and television. He is most associated with his character role as Johnny the Zip on Sylvester Stallone's show Tulsa King (2023–2024), where he appears as a series regular in season 2. The Horror Vault Vol.1 (2008), which was released as a compilation of nine horror short stories, contains the 2005 movie short thriller Alone, in which Nardulli plays Detective Wiley. He also appeared in The Last Ship in two episodes, "Long Day's Journey" and "Alone and Unafraid". Nardulli also appears in a recurring role on Criminal Minds as Detective Walker. He was nominated for Best Supporting Actor for the 2013 Utah Film Awards for his role as Antonio Sorrento for Proper Manors. He also received a second nomination as part of the Best Ensemble Nomination, also for Proper Manors.

== Filmography ==
=== Film ===
Year	Title	Role	Notes
2005	The Road to Canyon Lake	Dino	
2005	Alone	Detective Wiley	Short
2006	And Then It Breaks	Guy	
2007	United 300	Spartan	Short
2007	Jekyll	Policeman	
2008	Made of Honour	Basketball Player	
2008	The Horror Vault	Detective Wiley	Short
2009	Caught in the Game	Mr Goldstein	
2010	The Power of Liquor	Dustin	Short
2013	No Intent	Det. Testa	Short
2013	The Devil's in the Details	Bryan	
2013	The Big Lug	Hardknocks Hype Man	Short
2014	32 Seconds	Jerry	Short
2014	I'll Never Hurt You	Jerry	Short
2014	Lost in Reality	Mark	Short
2014	Chasing Denzel	Gavin (voice)	Short
2015	Any Day	Wayne	
2016	Teenage Cocktail	Officer Holland	
2016	Central Intelligence	Larry (voice)	
2016	Six Gun Savior	Dillion's Henchmen #1	
2017	Call Me King	Italian Killer Leader	
2017	Perception	Dean Harris	
2017	House by the Lake	Detective Galuzzo	
2017	The Intruders	Trendo Fox in Store	
2017	The Summoning	Detective Jonathan Silva	
2017	The Ghost and The Whale	Poe	
2018	The Choir Director	Andrew Gotti	
2018	Under the Silver Lake	Door Guard	
2019	City with Two Faces	Batman	
2020	The Nowhere Inn	Security Guard	
2020	Unbelievable!!!!!	Apollo	
2020	The Last First Date	Tony	Short
2021	The Red Dress	Mark	Short
2021	Red Notice	Museum Reporter	
2021	Deadly Ride	Neighborhood Watch	
2022	Holy Death	Stan	
2022	Hollywood Laundromat	Heck	
2023	The Gods 2: The Dark Side	Vinnie	
2023	All of It Happened on a Thursday	Tony	
2024	Those Who Inherit the Earth	Adams	

=== Television ===
Year	Title	Role	Notes
2004	The Young and the Restless	Thug #1	Episode: "Episode #1.7901-#1.7903"
2004-06	Passions	Giancarlo	Regular Cast
2004-16	General Hospital	Various Roles	Regular Cast
2006	House M.D.	Coughing Cop	Episode: "Euphoria: Part 1"
2008	Without a Trace	Local Cop	Episode: "A Bend in the Road"
2008	Monk	Officer Spumante	Episode: "Mr. Monk Falls in Love"
2008	Criminal Minds	Undercover Cop	Episode: "The Crossing"
2008	CSI: NY	Vincent	Episode: "The Box"
2010	Undercovers	Tony	Episode: "Xerxes"
2012	How I Met Your Mother	Vinny	Episode: "The Drunk Train"
2012-13	The Mamaluke	Eddie	Recurring Cast
2012-16	Proper Manors	Antonio Sorrento	Recurring Cast: Season 1, Guest: Season 2-3
2013	Vegas	Paul Zummo	Episode: "From This Day Forward"
2013	Justified	Gun Thug	Episode: "Ghosts"
2013	Revenge	Security Guard #2	Episode: "Truth: Part 1"
2014	Criminal Minds	Detective Walker	Episode: "The Edge of Winter"
2014	Castle	Bodyguard	Episode: "That '70s Show"
2015	The Last Ship	Giovanni	Recurring Cast: Season 2
2015	Where the Bears Are	Jimmy Delvecchio	Recurring Cast: Season 4
2015	Confessions of a Bartender	Customer	Episode: "Drunk People"
2015	Real Rob	Guy	Episode: "Gaying in Shape"
2016	Rush Hour	King	Episode: "O Hostage! My Hostage!"
2017	Days of Our Lives	Gio	Episode: "Episode #1.13016"
2018	S.W.A.T.	Uni Officer #2	Episode: "Armory"
2018	Proper Manors: The Series	Antonio Sorrento	Recurring Cast
2018	Millennial Mafia	Second Attacker	Episode: "Pilot"
2018	Dirt	Jason	Recurring Cast
2019	The Bold and the Beautiful	Vincent	Regular Cast
2020	Starwood University	Coach Rex	Episode: "The Will"
2020	The Madam$	Brandt Russo	Episode: "Ghetto Pap Smear"
2021	Why Women Kill	Sid Hemple	Episode: "Scene of the Crime"
2021	All American	Referee	Guest Cast: Season 3-4
2023	Erin & Aaron	Donnie	Episode: "Somebody's Watching Me"
2023-24	Tulsa King	Johnny The Zip	Guest: Season 1, Recurring Cast: Season 2

=== Video games ===
Year	Title	Role
2011	L.A. Noire	Edward Hemmings (voice)
2020	Mafia: Definitive Edition	Joey Cracker (voice)
