= White Horse, Dark Dragon =

1993 novel by Robert C. Fleet

White Horse, Dark Dragon is a novel written in the style of magical realism by Robert C. Fleet, a political satire-adventure. Although the book was held up for publication for contractual reasons, it was finally published by Putnam/Berkley/Ace in 1993.

== Plot summary ==
The action takes place in a fictional Central European country, Karistan, where the beautiful Alta lives with her young blind daughter Jewel. Jewel has a friend in the form of an enigmatic white horse. Soon they meet an American visitor named Jim Martin, who has been sent to Karistan to prove that a new investment is not going to harm the environment in Karistan.

== Background ==
The book is described by The Science Fiction Chronicle as "an interesting juxtaposition of fantasy and modern politics," and has become something of a cult novel due to its dry political humor satirizing late-era Communism and U.S. corporate boardrooms - mixed with action, historical romance and nuanced characters.

== Film adaptation ==
Legend of the White Horse (also known as Biały smok) is a 1987 Polish-American adventure movie for kids that is based on the novel, but altered significantly to tone down the satire elements.
