= Speak No Evil (2013 film) =

2013 American independent horror film

Speak No Evil is a 2013 American independent horror film written and directed by Roze and produced by Gas Mask Films and financed by MINDPLATE.tv. It stars Gabrielle Stone, Carl Jensen, Mario Guzman, Olivia Cavender, Annalise Cavender, Elisabeth Cavender, and Sean Wesley. The film was scored by Jason Camiolo.

== Plot ==
Speak No Evil is the story of Anna (Gabrielle Stone), a young single mother and her daughter who are trying to survive after the rest of the town's children have been possessed by demons. The movie begins with the disappearance of Joey Girl (Olivia Cavender) from a small desert town. Her mother, Anna, calls the police, but isn't taken seriously until all of the children in the town disappear overnight. When the children, including Joey Girl, return, they appear changed; parents in the town turn against their children. Anna strives to save her daughter while helping the other youngsters.

== Cast ==
- Gabrielle Stone as Anna
- Olivia Cavender as Joey Girl
- Carl Jensen as Craighton
- Mario Guzma as Dale
- Greg Bronson as Noel
- Annalise Cavender as Becca
- Elisabeth Cavender as Jessabelle
- Sylvie Cohen as Miss Crowley
- Sean Wesley as Adramelech

== Production ==
Gas Mask Films, a Tempe-based production company owned by Roze and his wife, Candace Rose, began production on Speak No Evil in October 2012. Production lasted sixteen days and was completed on October 29, 2012,.

=== Script and Development ===
Speak No Evil was written by Roze and Candace Rose as an art-house horror film about the sun god Adramelech.

=== Casting ===
Speak No Evil was produced in Arizona and has a cast largely made up of Arizona talent, including the Cavender sisters. Gabrielle Stone, an up-and-coming actress and daughter of noted actress Dee Wallace is one exception.

=== Filming ===
Speak No Evil was shot on the Red Epic camera in 16 days in Apache Junction in Arizona. It was largely crewed by students and alumni of the Film School at Scottsdale Community College.

== Release ==
Speak No Evil began its limited theatrical release when it premiered at the Tempe Valley Art, which is part of the Harkins Theatre chain in Tempe, Arizona on May 24, 2013.

== Awards ==
Speak No Evil won Best Horror Feature at the Jerome Film Festival in Jerome, Arizona.

== Reception ==
The filmed garnered mixed reviews from a number of film review websites.
