= Dying to Remember =

- Genre: Drama / Thriller
- Written by: George Schenck; Frank Cardea; Brian L. Ross
- Directed by: Arthur Allan Seidelman
- Starring: Melissa Gilbert; Ted Shackelford
- Music by: Jay Gruska
- Country of origin: United States
- Original language: English language

Production
- Executive producers: Frank Cardea; George Schenck
- Producer: Tom Rowe
- Production locations: Vancouver; San Francisco
- Cinematography: Glen MacPherson
- Editor: Bert Glatstein
- Running time: 87 minutes
- Production company: Wilshire Court Productions

Original release
- Network: USA Network
- Release: December 2, 1993

Dying to Remember is a 1993 American made-for-television thriller drama film directed by Arthur Allan Seidelman and starring Melissa Gilbert and Ted Shackelford.

== Plot ==
Lynn Matthews (Melissa Gilbert) is a Manhattan-based successful clothing designer who has recurring nightmares of a woman (Kat Green) falling down an elevator shaft. She decides to visit Dr. James Portman (Jay Robinson) and undergoes hypnotherapy, during which she learns that the woman falling is Lynn herself in her previous life, pushed down the shaft by a man in San Francisco in 1963. The nightmares cause her to start slacking at work, and her boss Denise (Babz Chula) forces her to take a six-week vacation to recover. She decides to take the time off to travel to San Francisco and find out who the lady in her dreams is. She locates the building quickly and the same night learns in her dream that the woman is named Mary Ann.

The next day, Lynn visits the archives and finds out that there was one woman named Mary Ann who died in 1963. The lady in question was 20 years old at the time, single, and committed suicide. Lynn is confused about her marital status and cause of death, because in her dreams she vividly remembers the girl wearing a wedding ring and being pushed by a man. She decides to visit the police, where Inspector Jeff Alberts (Scott Plank) insists on taking her case. He pulls up old files and notices that the case was handled by his colleague Daniel Corso (Christopher Stone). They decide to speak with him about the case, but Corso believes there is no reason to re-open it. Lynn then locates Mary Ann's marriage records, which show that she was married to Mark Gage (Ted Shackelford), a prominent real estate developer. She quickly informs Alberts about her discovery, but he grows suspicious of her insistence on finding out the truth, considering that she told them that she was merely doing research for her mother's homecoming class reunion. Corso alerts Gage on Lynn's snooping, and he is clearly concerned.

By accident, Lynn bumps into Gage and realizes that she met him days earlier in New York, when her cab accidentally ran into him. He follows her and retrieves her files that she signed at his office, and then compares her handwriting to a letter written to him by Mary Ann. Struck by her similar looks to Mary Ann, he invites her over for dinner, then catches her going through his stuff in his house. He asks her about her true motives for contacting him, but Lynn quickly leaves.

Throughout the process of gathering evidence, Lynn is repeatedly harassed by an unknown person. When someone slashes her tires, she thinks Gage is behind it and tells Alberts about her suspicions. He digs up further information about the case and discovers that Mary Ann was pregnant at the time of her death. When confronting Corso with their gathered information, he admits having withhold information because it would have crushed her religious parents, then allows them to re-open the case. Afterwards, he immediately contacts Gage, telling him they have to kill Lynn like they killed Mary Ann. Corso leads Lynn to the same elevator shaft he pushed Mary Ann into, and is about to lead her to the same fate when suddenly Gage appears and threatens to kill him. Gage reveals that he indeed was married to Mary Ann, which caused a scandal with his wealthy family. His family then hired Corso to pay Mary Ann enough money to leave Gage, but she refused and threatened to go to the police, at which point he killed her. Gage then kept quiet in order to protect his father. A shootout ensues, during which Gage is shot. Lynn fights Corso off and he eventually falls to his death in the elevator shaft.

== Cast ==
- Melissa Gilbert as Lynn Matthews
- Ted Shackelford as Mark Gage
- Scott Plank as Inspector Jeff Alberts
- Christopher Stone as Daniel 'Dan' Corso
- Jay Robinson as Dr. James Portman
- Kat Green as Mary Ann Emerson
- Wade Anderson as Young Mark Gage
- Sandra Nelson as Kelsey Daniels
- Babz Chula as Denise Ralston
- James Kidnie as Desk Sergeant
- Peter Williams as New York cabbie
- Alvin Sanders as San Francisco cabbie
- Brian Knox McGugan as Young Dan Corso

== Reception ==
Reviewer of Variety wrote: "You would think that past-life regression would open up fresh angles for a murder mystery, but routine execution undermines Dying to Remember, a wooden movie with a smart title."

In her memoir, Gilbert called the film "a stinker".
