= Apparitional (film) =

2013 American horror film

- Promotional release poster
- Directed by: Andrew P. Jones
- Written by: Andrew P. Jones
- Produced by: Andrew P. Jones; Linara Washington; Andy W. Meyer; Barney Burman
- Starring: Jeffrey Johnson; Linara Washington; Charley Koontz; John Zderko; Bill Lithgow; Dee Wallace; Peter Mayer
- Cinematography: Warren Yeager
- Edited by: Andrew P. Jones
- Music by: Andrew P. Jones
- Release date: 20 July 2013 (Jefferson City)
- Running time: 84 minutes
- Country: United States
- Language: English

Apparitional, also known as Haunting of Cellblock 11, is a 2013 American horror film about a reality TV ghost hunting crew that investigates an abandoned prison. It was directed and written by Andrew P. Jones. The film premiered on July 20, 2013 at the Goodrich Capital 8 Theaters in Jefferson City, Missouri where most of the movie was filmed.

== Plot ==
A ghost hunting crew from Los Angeles, California is told by their boss, Ms. Simon, that if they are not able to better their ratings, their show, Ghost Sightings will be cancelled.

The crew is visited by a man named Mr. Gaffney, who tells the leader of the crew, Joel, that he knows of property back home where he fears evil spirits haunt the halls and attack humans. Mr. Gaffney asks them to get rid of the ghosts, though Joel tries to explain to him that they only investigate them and getting rid of ghosts is much more difficult.

The crew travels to the area and they stop at a restaurant before heading to the haunted location, which is revealed to be an abandoned prison.

Once at the prison, they are given a tour by Clive, a former worker. He also warns the crew to leave and not to proceed with their investigation. Clive tells them the story of a prisoner escaping from his cell and murdering another inmate by snapping his neck before biting off flesh.

Clive then takes the crew down to the infirmary where he tells the story of a doctor who paralyzed his inmate patients and then performed illegal experiments on them in hopes to fix their psyche. He explains that the legend says the doctor was eventually sent to prison himself and was killed by the inmates.

The crew then begins their overnight investigation of the prison. When investigating the cell block, Roger is attacked by the ghost of a former prisoner. The ghost possesses Roger's body and creates large gashes and bruises on the side of his head. Berger and Joel rush Roger back to the video control room with Kate and decide to leave the prison, but discover that they are chain-locked in. They bandage up Roger, but realize that they don't have enough medical supplies, so they decide to go to the infirmary, where Berger is also attacked by ghosts and taken away.

Joel goes back to Kate and they decide it's best to go look for Berger, then come back for Roger. Kate is attacked by ghosts while searching for Berger in the cell block, but escapes by using a new device Roger purchased that disrupts ghost energy. The ghost possesses Roger's body, cornering Kate and Joel on the third floor of the prison. The ghosts want the crew to bring them the doctor who tortured them. Joel and Kate try to tell the ghost that the doctor had been killed, but the ghost ignores them. Roger fights internally with the ghost and is able to speak with Joel and Kate, telling them that he can't have them hurt on his watch and ultimately hangs himself.

After mourning the loss of Roger, Joel and Kate begin their search for Berger again, finding him near the entryway. He tells Joel and Kate that he may have found a second way out. They follow Berger to an area of the grounds outside the prison, though still fenced in. Kate is able to find a signal on her cell phone out there and calls the police.

The next morning, the crew is let out of the prison and confronts Clive for locking them inside, but he insists it was not him. After the paramedics and police leave the area, the crew calls in Mr. Gaffney and asks him to come inside the prison to see if he notices any difference in the energy. He walks inside and explains that it felt different from the time he worked there.

It is revealed that Mr. Gaffney was in the fact the doctor who tortured and sexually molested the inmates. He then begins to get angry at Joel and Kate when they explain that they did not get rid of the ghosts. After the confrontation, Joel and Kate trick Mr. Gaffney, locking him inside the prison, where the ghosts are seen dragging him away from the doors. Joel, Kate, and Berger drive back to Los Angeles and vow to end the Ghost Sightings series.

== Cast ==
- Jeffrey Johnson as Joel
- Linara Washington as Kate
- Charley Koontz as Berger
- John Zderko as Roger/Entity
- Bill Lithgow as Mr. Gaffney
- Dee Wallace as Ms. Simon
- Peter Mayer as Clive
- Andy Gates as Prison Guard
- Amanda Chism as Story Producer
- Jay Shipman as Intern #1
- Sloan Hoffmann as Intern Amy

== Release ==
The film was first shown at 9:30 am at the Goodrich Capital 8 Theaters in Jefferson City, Missouri and again at midnight on July 20, 2013. The film was shot at the local Missouri State Penitentiary, which is an abandoned prison in Jefferson City that was closed in 2004 and now runs tours, including a ghost tour where the prison is believed to be haunted to former inmates, much like in the film.

In a press release held at the prison that same day, director Andrew P. Jones explained that it is very difficult to get films in theaters, so Apparitional will not be getting a theatrical release, exclaiming that the cast and crew loved Jefferson City so much that they all agreed to give the locals a date to go out and view the film in theaters before it was released to DVD. He then went on to say that the film would likely see a DVD release around July 2014.
