= Hear No Evil =

Hear No Evil may refer to:

- Part of the adage See no evil, hear no evil, speak no evil
- Hear No Evil (1982 film), a 1982 made-for-TV film
- Hear No Evil (1993 film), a 1993 film starring Marlee Matlin and Martin Sheen
- Hear No Evil (2014 film), a 2014 film starring Richard T. Jones, Jill Marie Jones, and Jahnee Wallace
- Hear No Evil (album), a 1988 album by composer Bill Laswell
- Hear No Evil (Lord EP), a 2008 EP by Australian heavy metal band Lord
- "Hear No Evil" (The Flash), an episode of The Flash
- Hear No Evil (Young Thug EP), a 2018 EP by American rapper Young Thug
- "Operation Hear No Evil", a 2016 episode of Regular Show

== See also ==
- Speak No Evil (disambiguation)
- See No Evil (disambiguation)
- 3 Monkeys (disambiguation), associated with the adage
