= Art Metrano =

American actor (1936–2021)

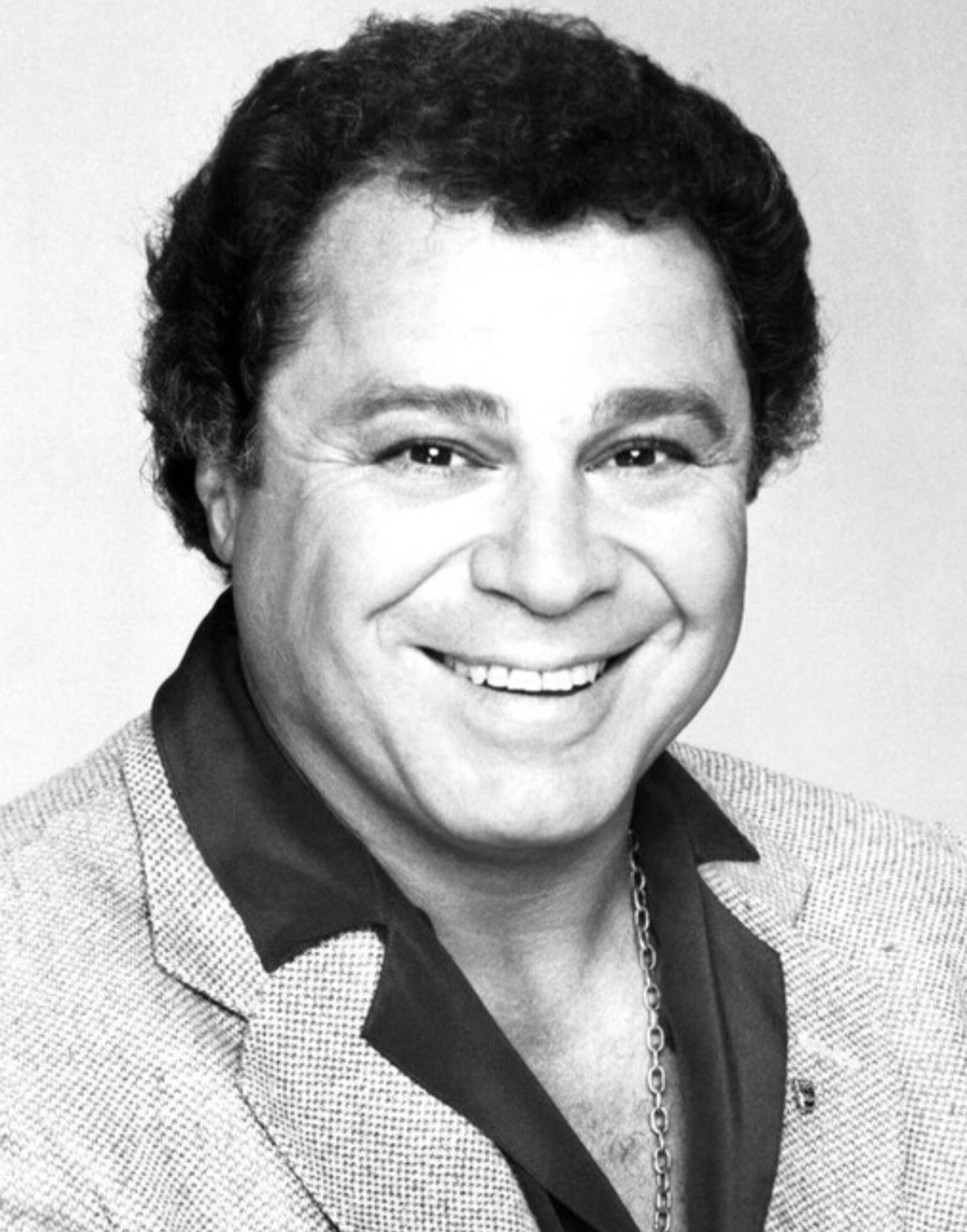
- Metrano in Joanie Loves Chachi, 1982
- Born: Arthur Metrano; September 22, 1936; New York City, U.S.
- Died: September 8, 2021 (aged 84); Aventura, Florida, U.S.
- Occupations: Actor; comedian
- Years active: 1961–2008
- Spouses: Rebecca Chute; Jamie Golder
- Children: 4

Arthur Metrano (September 22, 1936 – September 8, 2021) was an American actor. He was noted for his role as Ernie Mauser in Police Academy 2: Their First Assignment and Police Academy 3: Back in Training.

== Career ==
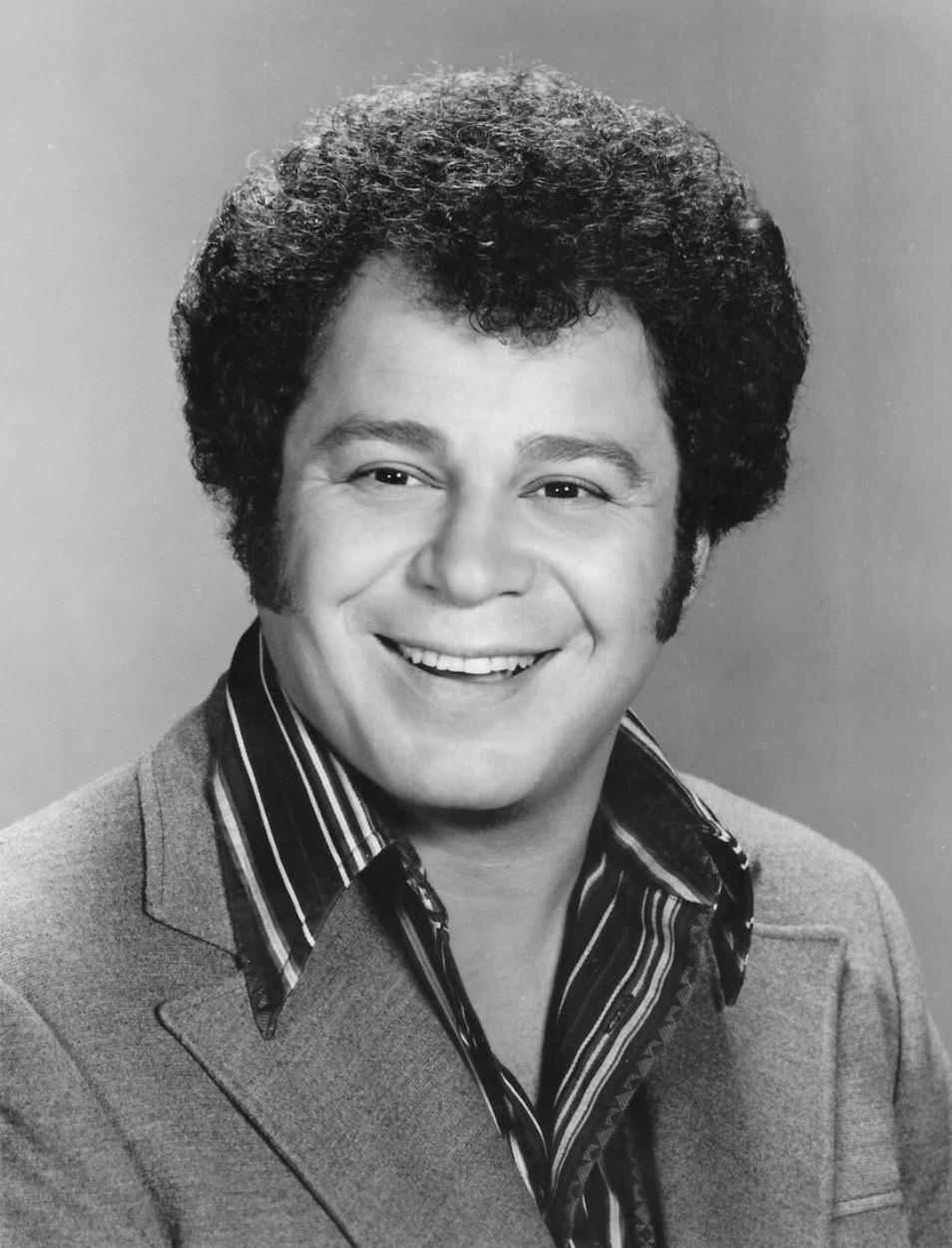
Metrano in 1971

Metrano's film debut was as a truck driver in the 1961 Cold War thriller Rocket Attack U.S.A.. Among Metrano's TV appearances were a 1968 episode of Ironside, a 1970 episode of Bewitched, a 1976 episode of The Practice, and The Streets of San Francisco. In 1977, he was a regular in the cast of the short-lived CBS situation comedy Loves Me, Loves Me Not.

He also frequently appeared on talk and variety shows in the early 1970s, especially The Tonight Show, as The Great Metrano, a "magician" who performed absurd tricks, such as making his fingers "jump" from one hand to another, while constantly humming an inane theme song – "Fine and Dandy", an early 1930s composition by Kay Swift.

His best-known role came in 1985 as Ernie Mauser in Police Academy 2. He reprised the role in its sequel Police Academy 3 a year later.

After injuring his spine in 1989, Metrano's on-screen appearances became limited during his rehabilitation. He did, however, return to television a year later and continued making guest appearances and small roles until retiring from acting in 2001. Between 1993 and 2001, Metrano infrequently toured a one-man show titled "Jews Don't Belong on Ladders...An Accidental Comedy", which has raised more than $75,000 for Project Support for Spinal Cord Injury, to help buy crutches, wheelchairs, and supplies for disabled people. After a final limited set of shows in 2008, Metrano retired.

In December 2007, Metrano sued Seth MacFarlane, the producers and studio behind the television show Family Guy, asserting copyright infringement, and asking for damages of over two million dollars. The suit pertained to a "cutaway" segment from the 2005 episode Stewie Griffin: The Untold Story, where Stewie alludes to the miracles of Jesus Christ being "exaggerated a bit." The cutaway shows Jesus performing to a group of awed onlookers while doing Metrano's act: making his fingers jump between hands while humming "Fine and Dandy". The case was settled out of court in 2010 with undisclosed terms.

== Personal life ==
Originally from Brooklyn, New York City, Metrano lived in Aventura, Florida, with his second wife Jamie Golder. He had four children. He was born to a Turkish Jewish father and a Greek Jewish mother. Following his retirement from acting, Metrano owned a yogurt shop.

On September 17, 1989, Metrano broke his neck and seriously injured his spinal cord after falling off a ladder while working on his house. Initially a quadriplegic, he later regained the use of his arms and legs, and was able to walk short distances with the help of crutches, although he regularly used a motorized wheelchair.

== Death ==
Metrano died of natural causes on September 8, 2021, at his home in Aventura, Florida at the age of 84.

== Filmography ==
- Rocket Attack U.S.A. (1961) — Truck Driver
- They Shoot Horses, Don't They? (1969) — Max
- Adam-12 (1969, TV Series) - Will Davis
- Norma (1970) — Delivery Man
- Bonanza (1970) — Leroy Gaskell
- They Only Kill Their Masters (1972) — Malcolm
- The Heartbreak Kid (1972) — Entertainer
- Slaughter's Big Rip-Off (1973) — Mario Burtoli
- The All-American Boy (1973) — Jay David Swooze
- The Treasure of Jamaica Reef (1974) — Waiter
- Dirty O'Neil (1974) — Lassiter
- The Strongest Man in the World (1975) — TV Color Man
- Linda Lovelace for President (1975) — The Sheik
- Kolchak: The Night Stalker (1975) — Henry "Studs" Spake
- Brinks: The Great Robbery (1976) — Julius Mareno
- Starsky & Hutch (1976, TV Series) — Amboy
- Warhead (1977) — Mario
- All in the Family (1978) — Jack
- Matilda (1978) — Gordon Baum
- Wonder Woman (1978) — Friedman
- The Incredible Hulk (1978) — Charlie
- Seven (1979) — Kinsella
- Fred and Barney Meet the Thing (1979) – Spike Hanrahan (voice)
- Benson (1979) — Captain Bates
- Benson (1980) — Captain Bates
- How to Beat the High Cost of Living (1980) — Gas Station Attendant
- Cheaper to Keep Her (1981) — Tony Turino
- Going Ape! (1981) — Joey
- History of the World, Part I (1981) — Leonardo da Vinci (The Roman Empire)
- Fantasy Island (1982) - Eddie Kimball
- Breathless (1983) — Birnbaum
- Joanie Loves Chachi (1982–1983) — Rico Mastorelli
- Fantasy Island (1983) - Conway Ferguson
- Teachers (1984) — Troy
- Tiger: Springtime in Vienna (1984) — Tiger
- The A-Team (1985) — Nick Gretsch
- Malibu Express (1985) — Matthew
- Police Academy 2: Their First Assignment (1985) — Lieutenant Mauser
- Police Academy 3: Back in Training (1986) — Captain Mauser
- The Last Precinct (1986) — Mumbo Bob Volcanus
- Beverly Hills Bodysnatchers (1989) — Vic
- Real Men Don't Eat Gummy Bears (1989) — Agent 712
- Hunter (1991) — Bert Nadell
- Strawberry Road (1991) – Jill's father
- Toys (1992) — Guard at Desk
- Murder in Mind (1997) — Judge
- How Stella Got Her Groove Back (1998) — Dr. Steinberg
- Good Advice (2001) — Homeless Man (final film role)
