= Soon-tek Oh =

Korean–American actor (1932–2018)

Soon-tek Oh 오순택
- Soon-tek Oh as Sensei in Beverly Hills Ninja
- Born: June 29, 1932; Mokpobu, Korea (now Mokpo, South Korea)
- Died: April 4, 2018 (aged 85); Los Angeles, California, U.S.
- Other name: Soon-taek Oh
- Occupation: Actor
- Years active: 1965–2006

- Soon-tek Oh
- Hangul: 오순택
- RR: O Suntaek
- MR: O Sunt'aek

Soon-tek Oh (Korean: 오순택, O Sun-taek – also spelled as Soon-taek Oh or Soon-taik Oh or Soon-teck Oh; June 29, 1932 – April 4, 2018) was a Korean–American actor. He was the voice of Fa Zhou in Disney's Mulan and the direct-to-video sequel Mulan II and the sadistic Colonel Yin in Missing in Action 2: The Beginning. He has starred in many films, and also acted in television series, including Stargate SG-1; MacGyver; M*A*S*H; Charlie's Angels; Airwolf, Magnum, P.I.; Hawaii Five-O; Kung-Fu; Zorro; The Man with the Golden Gun; The Final Countdown: Baa Baa Black Sheep; Highlander: The Series and Touched by an Angel.

== Early life ==
Oh was born on June 29, 1932, in Mokpo during the period when Korea was under Japanese rule. He attended high school at Gwangju, South Korea, and attended Yonsei University in Seoul.

After the end of Japanese rule in August 1945 and before the outbreak of the Korean War in June 1950, Oh and his family emigrated to the United States where he attended the University of Southern California. He later earned an MFA from UCLA.

== Acting career ==
On Broadway, Oh appeared in the original cast of the Stephen Sondheim musical Pacific Overtures. He was an early member of East West Players, an Asian American theatre group founded in 1965.

In 1995, Oh founded the Korean American theatre group, Society of Heritage Performers, which later evolved into the present Lodestone Theatre Ensemble. From 2005, he was a professor at Seoul Institute of the Arts.

== Death ==
Oh died in Los Angeles on April 4, 2018, at age 85 after a lengthy battle with Alzheimer's disease, according to actor Chil Kong.

== Partial filmography ==
=== Films ===
- 1966 Murderers' Row as Tempura, Japanese Secret Agent (uncredited)
- 1967 Yongary, Monster From The Deep as Chinese Agent (uncredited)
- 1971 Earth II as Chinese Diplomat (uncredited)
- 1971 One More Train to Rob as Yung
- 1974 The Man with the Golden Gun as Lieutenant Hip (as Soon-taik Oh)
- 1978 Good Guys Wear Black as Major Mhin Van Thieu, The Black Tigers
- 1980 The Final Countdown as Simura, Imperial Japanese Navy Air Service Pilot
- 1982 The Letter as Ong
- 1985 Bialy smok as Tai Ching
- 1985 Missing in Action 2 as Colonel Yin
- 1985 Yuki Shimoda as Himself (interviewed)
- 1987 Steele Justice as General Bon-soong Kwan
- 1987 Biały smok as Tai-ching
- 1987 Death Wish 4: The Crackdown as Detective Phil Nozaki
- 1989 Soursweet as "Red" Cudgel
- 1989 Collision Course as Chief Inspector Kitao
- 1993 A Home of Our Own as Mr. Munimura
- 1994 Red Sun Rising as Yamata
- 1994 S.F.W. as Milt Morris
- 1996 Street Corner Justice as Kwong-chuck Lee
- 1997 Beverly Hills Ninja as Sensei
- 1998 Yellow as Woon Lee
- 1998 Mulan as Fa Zhou (voice)
- 2000 The President's Man as General Vinh Tran
- 2001 Roads and Bridges as Father (voice)
- 2001 Forgotten Valor as Colonel
- 2001 True Blue as "Tiger"
- 2002 The Visit as Sujong's Father
- 2002 SWAT as Sayonara
- 2004 Mulan II as Fa Zhou (voice)
- 2005 Last Mountain as Karus
- 2006 Gang-jeok as Jong-chae (final film role)

=== Television (partial list) ===
- 1967 The Invaders as Houseboy
- 1968–1979 Hawaii Five-O (8 episodes) as Robert Kwon / David Chung / Chaing / Tom Wong / Vic Tanaka / Lao / Lewis Shen / Wo Fat's Lab Technician
- 1970 Death Valley Days , episode "The Dragon of Gold Hill" as Matsunosuke (Maso) Sakurai
- 1974 Kung Fu as Chen Yi
- 1975–1982 M*A*S*H (5 episodes) as Joon – Sung / Ralph / Dr. Syn Paik / Korean Soldier / Mr. Kwang
- 1977 Logan's Run as Dexter Kim
- 1977 Baa Baa Black Sheep as Lieutenant Miragochi / Colonel Tokura
- 1979 How the West Was Won as Kee
- 1980 Diff'rent Strokes as Mr. Kim
- 1981–1986 Magnum, P.I. (4 episodes) as General Nguyen Hue / Sato / Dr. Bill Su & Dr. Ling
- 1981 East of Eden as Lee
- 1982 Quincy, M.E. as Captain Bob Nishimura
- 1983 Hart to Hart as Lang Chen-cheng
- 1983 Girls of the White Orchid as Hatanaka
- 1983 Marco Polo as Wang Zhu
- 1984 The Master as Lika
- 1984–1987 Airwolf (3 episodes) as Minh / Tommy Liu / Hiyashi
- 1985–1986 T.J. Hooker (2 episodes) as Ginsu Nabutsu / Nguyen Chi
- 1987 Sky Commanders as Kodiak (voice)
- 1988 MacGyver as Raymond Ling
- 1989 Hunter (1 episode) as Nyuen Tran
- 1992 Highlander: The Series as Kiem Sun
- 1993 The Legend of Prince Valiant as Sing Lu (voice)
- 1994 Babylon 5 as The Muta-Do
- 1994–1995 Kung Fu: The Legend Continues (3 episodes) as Bon-bon Hai
- 1996 The Real Adventures of Jonny Quest as General Yala (voice)
- 1997 Life with Louie as Buddhist Monk (voice)
- 1997 Stargate SG-1 as Moughal
- 2000 King of the Hill as Monk (voice)

== Accolades ==
In 2008, Soon-tek Oh was awarded the Lifetime Achievement Award by the San Diego Asian Film Festival.
