= The New Lassie =

- Genre: Family; Drama
- Starring: Will Nipper; Christopher Stone; Dee Wallace-Stone; Wendy Cox
- Country of origin: United States
- Original language: English
- No. of seasons: 2
- No. of episodes: 48

Production
- Executive producer: Al Burton
- Producer: John Ward
- Camera setup: Single-camera
- Running time: 25 mins.
- Production companies: Al Burton Productions; Palladium Entertainment; MCA TV

Original release
- Network: Syndication
- Release: September 8, 1989 – February 15, 1992

Related
- Lassie; Lassie

The New Lassie is an American family drama series which aired in first-run syndication from September 8, 1989 to February 15, 1992. The series stars Will Estes (then using his real name of Will Nipper) as Will McCullough, Lassie's new master. Real life husband and wife Christopher and Dee Wallace-Stone co-starred as Will's parents.

The New Lassie is essentially a sequel to the 1954 series, and was the latest in the line of works featuring the Lassie character, which debuted in the 1943 film Lassie Come Home, followed by several more movies and the aforementioned television series, which ran from 1954 to 1973.

== Synopsis ==
The series centers on the McCulloughs, a middle-class family living in fictional suburban Glen Ridge, California. The McCulloughs are the owners of the then-present-day descendant of Lassie. Real life spouses Christopher and Dee Wallace-Stone played Chris and Dee McCullough, with Will Estes (credited by his given name of Will Nipper) and Wendy Cox appearing as their young son Will and teenage daughter Megan respectively.

co-star Will McCullough (Will Nipper / a.k.a. Estes) with collie Lassie during the 1989–1992 syndication run of The New Lassie series

Jon Provost (born 1950), who starred in the original Lassie series, portrayed Chris' brother Steve McCullough who was revealed in a later episode to be the now adult Timmy Martin in an episode guest-starring June Lockhart (born 1925), in a reprisal of her original role as Timmy's foster mother Ruth Martin (1958–1964). In the episode titled "Roots", Timmy reveals that he was never officially adopted by the Martins and thus couldn't go with them to Australia when they moved there (at the beginning of season 11 of the second version of the original Lassie series, 1958–1964). Subsequently, he was later adopted by the McCullough family and began going by his middle name of Steven (Steve).

== Cast ==
- Will Nipper as Will McCullough
- Christopher Stone as Chris McCullough
- Dee Wallace-Stone as Dee McCullough
- Wendy Cox as Megan McCullough
- Jon Provost as Timmy Martin/Steve McCullough

=== Guest stars ===
Guest stars with a Lassie past included Roddy McDowall, who had starred in the first movie Lassie Come Home (1943) and Tommy Rettig, who had played Jeff Miller in the early years of the original television series (later syndicated as Jeff's Collie). Other guest stars included Leonardo DiCaprio and Todd Bridges.

== Episodes ==
=== Season 1 (1989–90) ===
No. overall	No. in season	Title	Directed by	Written by	Original release date
1	1	"Occurrence at Glen Ridge"	Sigmund Neufeld Jr.	Steve Feld	September 9, 1989
2	2	"City Lights"	Sigmund Neufeld Jr.	Mark Burley	September 16, 1989
3	3	"Bingo Was Her Name-O"	Sigmund Neufeld Jr.	Alan Moskowitz	September 23, 1989
4	4	"Heatwave"	Bruce Green	Paul Hunter	September 30, 1989
5	5	"Lassie at Last"	Dennis Donnelly	Joel Rogosin	October 7, 1989
6	6	"Halloween"	Scott Baio	Michael Thomas Mann & Bruce Rush	October 14, 1989
7	7	"Roots"	Alan Cooke	Bud Wiser	October 21, 1989
8	8	"Tinker"	Sigmund Neufeld Jr.	Joel Rogosin	October 28, 1989
9	9	"A Dog and His Boy"	Sigmund Neufeld Jr.	Bud Wiser	November 4, 1989
10	10	"New Generation"	Robert Caramico	Bud Wiser	November 11, 1989
11	11	"Once Upon a Time"	Tony Dow	Christopher Stone & Bruce Cameron	November 18, 1989
12	12	"Quality Time"	Larry Stewart	Mark Burley	November 25, 1989
13	13	"Guess Who's Coming to Breakfast, Lunch and Dinner?"	Christopher Stone	Joel Rogosin	September 8, 1990
14	14	"Still Life"	Alexander Singer	Christopher Stone & Bruce Cameron	February 17, 1990
15	15	"Trapped"	Scott Baio	Bob Hamner	February 24, 1990
16	16	"Just Another Saturday"	Sigmund Neufeld Jr.	Susan Goldberg	September 29, 1990
17	17	"He's Back"	Dennis Donnelly	Christopher Stone & Bruce Cameron	October 6, 1990
18	18	"Wild West"	Alan Cooke	Story by : Mitchell Cohen & Bruce Cook; Teleplay by : Bud Wiser	October 13, 1990
19	19	"Pot Hunters"	Sigmund Neufeld Jr.	Cathryn Michon & Eric Vennerbeck	October 20, 1990
20	20	"Watch Your Step"	Dennis Donnelly	Alan Moskowitz	October 27, 1990
21	21	"Burglary"	Dennis Donnelly	Michael Thomas Mann & Bruce Rush	November 3, 1990
22	22	"Snake Pit"	Renny Temple	Story by : Bud Wiser; Teleplay by : Mitchell Cohen & Bruce Cook	November 10, 1990
23	23	"Livewire"	Tony Dow	Jack Kaufman	November 17, 1990
24	24	"Kindness is Contagious"	Christopher Stone	David H. Vowell	November 24, 1990
25	25	"Witness"	Bruce Green	Jack Kaufman	December 1, 1990

=== Season 2 (1991–92) ===
No. overall	No. in season	Title	Directed by	Written by	Original release date
26	1	"The Diary of Sandy Frank"	Sigmund Neufeld Jr.	Bruce Rush	September 7, 1991
27	2	"Best of Show"	Sigmund Neufeld Jr.	Bud Wiser	September 14, 1991
28	3	"On the Beach"	Christopher Stone	Bud Wiser	September 17, 1991
29	4	"Leeds, the Judge"	Christopher Stone	Christopher Stone & Bruce Cameron	September 21, 1991
30	5	"The Gathering of the Clans"	Corey Allen	Christopher Stone & Bruce Cameron	September 28, 1991
31	6	"The Stranger"	Sigmund Neufeld Jr.	Ken Peragine & Howard Friedlander	October 5, 1991
32	7	"The Kitty Saver"	Robert Caramico	Robert Weatherwax & Arthur Anderson	October 12, 1991
33	8	"Slumber Party"	Mary Kay Place	Bud Wiser	October 17, 1991
34	9	"The Amazing Lassie"	Larry Stewart	Bud Wiser	October 25, 1991
35	10	"The Cave"	Christopher Stone	Mark Burley	November 2, 1991
36	11	"Lassie P.I."	Larry Stewart	Bud Wiser	November 9, 1991
37	12	"Hit and Run"	Sigmund Neufeld Jr.	Jack Kaufman	November 23, 1991
38	13	"Nikki's Family"	Christopher Stone	Bud Wiser	December 7, 1991
39	14	"Dog Day Afternoon"	Arthur Anderson	Christopher Stone & Bruce Cameron	December 14, 1991
40	15	"The Represa"	John H. Ward	Steve Stark & Michael Hitchcock	December 21, 1991
41	16	"The Commercial"	Robert Caramico	Christopher Stone & Bruce Cameron	January 4, 1992
42	17	"Fallen Idol"	Scott Baio	Mark Burley	January 11, 1992
43	18	"Punch Drunk"	Sigmund Neufeld Jr.	Jennifer Burton & David Lang	January 18, 1992
44	19	"A Rabbit's Tale"	Robert Weatherwax	Story by : Jon Provost; Teleplay by : Bud Wiser & Steve Stark	February 1, 1992
45	20	"A Will and a Way"	Christopher Stone	Christopher Stone & Bruce Cameron	February 15, 1992
46	21	"Hostage: A Dog's Life"	Sigmund Neufeld Jr.	Jack Kaufman	February 22, 1992
47	22	"Twin Pekes"	Sigmund Neufeld Jr.	Steve Feld	February 29, 1992
48	23	"The Computer Study"	Sigmund Neufeld Jr.	Tom Rettig & Joe Perret	March 7, 1992

== Production notes ==
The collie featured in The New Lassie was a fifth generation of Lassie. The dog was trained by Robert Weatherwax, the son of Rudd Weatherwax who trained the original Lassie. Robert was assisted by his only son Robert Jr.

== Syndication ==
Reruns of The New Lassie aired on TV Land Canada in 2007.
