= Death House =

- Theatrical release poster
- Directed by: Harrison Smith
- Written by: Gunnar Hansen; Harrison Smith
- Produced by: Rick Finkelstein; Steven Chase; Thomas Vanover
- Starring: Cody Longo; Cortney Palm; Adrienne Barbeau; Michael Berryman; Barbara Crampton; Sid Haig; Lindsay Hartley; Kane Hodder; Lloyd Kaufman; Camille Keaton; Bill Moseley; Felissa Rose; Tony Todd; Dee Wallace; Vernon Wells; Vincent Ward; Stelio Savante; Tony Moran
- Cinematography: Matt Klammer
- Edited by: Colin Smith
- Music by: John Avarese
- Production company: Entertainment Factory
- Distributed by: Hannover House
- Release dates: September 2, 2017 (Central Florida Film Festival); February 23, 2018 (United States)
- Running time: 95 minutes
- Country: United States
- Language: English
- Box office: $23,833

Death House is a 2017 American horror film written by Gunnar Hansen, who has a cameo in the film, and directed by Harrison Smith. The film features an ensemble cast of horror icons including Kane Hodder, Barbara Crampton, Bill Moseley, Dee Wallace, Tony Todd and Camille Keaton. Originally written by Hansen, the film started as a concept intended to bring as many well known horror actors together as possible. This is Hansen's final film performance, as it was released two years after his death. The film is also the final film performance of Cody Longo before his death in 2023.

== Plot ==
FBI agent Toria Boon arrives at Death House, a federal prison and research center where prisoners are confined to virtual environments whose crime simulations allow their behavior to be studied. Upon arrival, Boon is taunted by neo-Nazi criminal Alois Sieg, who she went undercover to capture, but killed a mother and her son to keep her cover. Captain Victor Galan greets Boon before introducing her to Dr. Eileen Fletcher and fellow agent Jae Novak. Galan escorts Boon to a holographic cell where she confronts and executes the serial killer who murdered her mother, after watching a live re-enactment of her mother's death.

Fletcher introduces Novak and Boon to her colleague, Dr. Karen Redmane, who explains that Death House uses drugs, machines, and simulations to keep inmates such as "Leatherlace" and "the Icicle Killer" docile. Boon and Novak then take a virtual tour of Death House, where they learn that the facility consists of nine levels. The lowest level houses the facility's most dangerous prisoners, the Five Evils, who are supposedly immortal. While showering together, Boon and Novak realize they don't remember details of their lives outside of their work. They later learn that homeless people are used as sacrifices in Death House's murder studies.

Outside, a mysterious boy attacks a perimeter guard and plants an electronic device inside the dying guard's stomach. A doctor discovers the electronic device while performing surgery on the injured guard. Removing the device triggers a power failure throughout the facility, trapping Boon and Novak in an elevator with Dr. Fletcher.

Sieg and other Death House inmates break loose and begin slaughtering guards. Despite being shot and gutted, Sieg survives and rallies the inmates together to go down to the ninth level and gain freedom through the Five Evils; the inmates kill Dr. Redmane on their way. Boon, Novak, and Dr. Fletcher escape the elevator and fight their way through rioting prisoners, hiding from Sieg by clinging to bodies hanging in a staging room of homeless victims, but Fletcher loses her grip and falls to her death.

Reasoning that the Five Evils offer the best chance of escape, Boon and Novak descend down an elevator shaft to the facility's lowest level. When confronted, prisoner Hirace Giger explains that there are multiple Death Houses being used to breed a new race that is neither good nor evil with technology as their new god. Boon and Novak realize that their memories are false, and they were former prisoners and subjects of Death House's experiments. Giger tells the agents that the Evils need to be released so the agents can pursue them in order to maintain the balance of good and evil in the world. Sieg interrupts their meeting and reveals that he has followed the Five Evils to become immortal like them, but Giger replies that Sieg is only a pawn in the Five Evils' escape plan.

Gas releases throughout Death House, causing inmates to collapse and Sieg to disintegrate. Boon and Novak escape as the facility comes back online. Outside, the two decide to go find out their true identities.

== Cast ==
- Kane Hodder as Sieg
- Barbara Crampton as Dr. Karen Redmane
- Bill Moseley as Giger
- Dee Wallace as Dr. Eileen Fletcher
- Camille Keaton as Kristi Boon
- Michael Berryman as Crau
- Tony Todd as Asa, The Farmer
- Sid Haig as The Icicle Killer
- Adrienne Barbeau as The Narrator
- Felissa Rose as Dr. Angela Freeman
- Cody Longo as Agent Jae Novak
- Lindsay Hartley as Balthoria
- Richard Speight Jr. as Bennett
- Cortney Palm as Agent Toria Boon
- Yan Birch as Staff Worker
- Gabrielle Stone as Linz Haddon
- Stelio Savante as Dr. Roos
- Erik Audé as Randy, The Rapist
- Sean Whalen as Satan
- Vernon Wells as Nela
- R. A. Mihailoff as Prison Leader
- Joseph Ferrante as Officer Dante
- Beverly Randolph as Staff Worker
- Gregory Blair as Bennett's Cast
- Lauren Compton as Dr. Logan Harrison
- Brinke Stevens as Head Staffer
- Vincent Ward as Thile
- Debbie Rochon as "Leatherlace"
- Tony Moran as Miguel
- Gunnar Hansen as Albert Kenny

== Production ==
The film was originally written by Gunnar Hansen and he intended for it to feature as many horror legends as possible. The most notable horror icons confirmed include Kane Hodder, Barbara Crampton, Bill Moseley, Dee Wallace, Camille Keaton, Sid Haig, Felissa Rose, Tony Todd, Adrienne Barbeau, and Michael Berryman.

It was originally speculated that Robert Englund would have a role but he said he was never given the script: "I’ve heard about the project but I’ve never been given a script. I don’t know other than Kane Hodder and Tony Todd from Candyman that’s involved. Obviously without Gunnar, I’m not so sure what’s going to happen with it".

== Release ==
The trailer premiered on September 3, 2016, at the Days of the Dead Convention. Shortly after the premier, horror website Bloody Disgusting hosted the trailer.

The film was released on video on demand on November 6, 2018 with a release on disc following on December 11, 2018.

== Soundtrack ==
On January 31, 2017, it was announced that the soundtrack for the film will feature songs from Deron Miller, Hatebreed and rap group Twiztid.

== Reception ==
Death House received primarily negative reviews, currently holding a 40% on Rotten Tomatoes. Michael Gingold of Rue Morgue Digital criticized the film's look and story, saying that "the horror content consists largely of poorly shot action that is sometimes so underlit that you can’t tell what’s going on" and "Death House’s only value is as a game of Spot-the-Celebrity - which at least provides a distraction from the tackiness of the plotting and filmmaking." In contrast, Michelle Swope of Dread Central rated the film 4.5 out of 5 stars, admitting "Not all of the performances are standout, but the bloody pandemonium and creative writing make this a damn good movie worthy of becoming a cult favorite."
