= Proper Manors =

- Genre: Soap opera
- Created by: Pietro D'Alessio
- Written by: Brandyn Cross
- Starring: Anne Sward; Hunter Gomez; Mia Tate; Walter Platz; Orion Hansen
- Theme music composer: Bill Davidson of B.A.D Music Productions
- Opening theme: Bill Davidson of B.A.D Music Productions
- Original language: English
- No. of seasons: 3
- No. of episodes: 85

Production
- Producers: Jessica Diekmann; Teresa Gordon; Kim McDonald; Jef Phillips
- Production location: Ogden, Utah
- Editors: Tina Dawn Rayley; Camilla Whitney; Robin Westover
- Running time: 22 Minutes
- Production companies: Ten Spoke Productions, BTS Photography, New Ogden Cinema, Surgical Dalliance Films, Proper Manors

Original release
- Network: Proper Manors TV
- Release: May 31, 2012 – September 23, 2016

Proper Manors is a dramatic soap opera about the small, fictional town of Proper, USA and its inhabitants. The web-based TV series is filmed and produced primarily in Salt Lake City and Ogden, Utah, where most of the cast and crew are from. The show was created by Pietro D'Alessio and is based loosely on his experiences growing up in various locations across the country.

== Overview ==
The show is about the town of Proper, USA, and specifically focuses on the trials and tribulations faced by the adults and teenagers in the community. In season 1 of the show, one of Proper's teens, Joey Sorrento, and his peers begin to discover shortly after graduation that they are merely pawns in the games that the adults of Proper play. In season 2, with the introduction of new characters, scandals continue to unfold and the town is confronted with the mysterious murders of several of its teens. Season 3, currently in production, brings a whole new level of drama as the audience gets to know the residents of Proper on a much more intimate level.

== Development ==
Creator Pietro D'Alessio was a fan of soap operas growing up and came up with the initial idea for Proper Manors when he was in 7th grade. The main character, Joey, and the challenges he faces in the show are loosely based on D'Alessio and experiences from his own youth. Originally slated to be produced in New Hampshire, Proper Manors began production in Ogden, Utah on March 17, 2012 and remains in production today.

== Cast ==
Main Cast
Character	Actor
Blanche Crawford Sorrento	Anne Sward
Alessandro Sorrento	Walter Platz
Joey Sorrento	Hunter Gomez (Season 1 & 2)
Jef Knights	Beau Stine (Season 1) Nathan Day (Season 2)
Fancy Hicks	Mia Tate
Crazy Jane	Melinda Chilton
Antonio Sorrento	Guy Nardulli
Medio Sorrento	Josh Rowe
Holly Olden	Ali Webb
Claire Walden	Amy Lia
Trina Trapnell	Emily Arnold
Michelle Summerfield	Toi'ya Leatherwood
Shila Hicks	Amy Savannah
Miles Barnes	Brandyn Cross
Victoria Rose	MaryAlice Nelson

== Episodes ==
As of September 17, 2015, the show has aired 85 episodes over 3 seasons.

=== Season 1 (2012-2013) ===
No. in season	Title	Plot Summary	Original air date
1	Welcome to Proper		May 31, 2012
2	You've Been Warned		June 7, 2012
3	Fancy Meeting You Here		June 14, 2012
4	Mommie Dearest, Part 1	Blanche shares the news that her mother has died and the battle for Mildred's money begins as she tries to keep it from Joey.	July 19, 2013
5	Mommie Dearest, Part 2		August 1, 2013
6	Meet Magnolia	Magnolia expresses concern about her grandchildren: the intelligence of her son, Jimmy Ray, and the past and future intentions of her daughter-in-law, Fancy Hicks.	January 24, 2014
7	Caught on Camera: Detective Sanford	Detective Grady Sanford grieves the loss of his partner.	January 27, 2014
8	Meet Sandra Sylvan	Good girl Sandra Sylvan heard about the big party Joey Sorrento is throwing at Soul & Bones and intends to be there to find a new man to add some excitement to her dull life. Her strict parents would never approve but, in this town, what the parents don't know seems to be pretty common.	January 28, 2014
9	Caught on Camera: Morris Finkleman	Morris Finkleman is one of Proper's few attorneys and, as a result, often ends up working on projects for both Blanche and Alessandro Sorrento. He was caught on camera in his therapy session discussing his concerns with therapist Susan Black.	January 29, 2014
10	Caught on Camera: Susan Black	Therapist Susan Black takes a moment to reflect on Mildred's funeral and Blanche's state of mind due to the stress. She thinks she may have seen someone from Blanche's past at the church.	January 30, 2014
11	Meet Hope Rogers	Hope Rogers, Joey's 6th grade girlfriend and loyal protector of everything he does, is preparing for tonight's party at Soul & Bones, but first she has some thoughts she wants to share about Mildred's funeral, Claire Walden, and Trina Trapnell.	January 30, 2014
12	Mommie Dearest, Part 3	As Proper grieves the loss of town matriarch Mildred Dean Crawford, Joey and his friends have a "get rich" party at Soul & Bones, Medio's drug debts finally become due, and lovers and friends are mysteriously unavailable in this nail-biting season finale that will change everything for the Sorrento's and the town of Proper forever.	January 30, 2014

=== Season 2 (2013-2014) ===
No. in season	Title	Plot Summary	Original air date
1	Meet Sheldon & Shelly	Brother and sister Sheldon and Shelly Balducci are as opposite as you can imagine. Shelly, a well-behaved bad girl always on the prowl for her one true love, is full of surprises. Sheldon, still a student at Proper Middle & High School, has bigger plans for his life. Shelly was hoping to make the party at Soul & Bones. Is it possible she hasn't heard about the new developments in downtown Proper?	January 31, 2014
2	Frank's True Colors	Reverend Frank Holder intends to keep Proper free of sinners and evil-doers. One family seems to be the core of his battle against all that is wrong Proper and he wants to ensure they answer to a Higher Being. How many members of his congregation truly embrace his ideology?	February 1, 2014
3	Meet Miles Barnes	Miles Barnes just watched the pregame and the Super Bowl. He happened to see the Exclusive Interview with Obama during the pregame and decides to post his opinion about the Affordable Care Act, aka Obamacare.	February 2, 2014
4	Caught on Camera: Alessandro Sorrento	Alessandro Sorrento, as the patriarch of the Sorrento family, seems to be getting hit from many directions and someone may or may not be sabotaging his success. With the new developments at Soul & Bones, missing money, and a family causing drama all over town, he isn't sure what he needs to be doing differently, but he has to figure it out...and soon. After all, is crossing the Sorrento's ever really a good idea?	February 7, 2014
5	Meet Michelina	Michelina Sorrento hasn't spent as much time in Proper as the rest of her family. Being the daughter of Medio Sorrento, her mom thought it was best they live elsewhere since the Sorrento family is filled with so much drama. Lina, as everyone calls her, is missing her cousins and grandparents and is thinking that maybe Proper isn't so bad. She has her sights on becoming a successful actress one day, but will her family support her dreams or kill her ambition?	February 22, 2014
6	The Mayor		March 14, 2014
7	Meet Olive Tever	City Manager Olive Tever frantically tries to reach her sons after the explosion at Soul & Bones Restaurant.	April 23, 2014
8	Inferno: Part 1	In the aftermath of the explosion and fire at the Sorrento's restaurant Soul & Bones, emergency crew and Proper, USA city officials arrive on scene for a rescue and recovery mission of the youth of Proper.	April 24, 2014
9	Meet Sherrie Simmons	Sherrie Simmons is one of Proper's better-behaved girls. She is safe, but may not react well once she hears what happened to Joey, especially considering her older brother, Jack, is one of Joey's oldest friends.	April 29, 2014
10	Magnolia Hears an Explosion	Magnolia heard an explosion in downtown Proper that has really spooked her and she isn't sure what is happening.	April 30, 2014
11	Meet Reba Collier	Reba, part of the prominent and connected Collier family, has grown up in the historic part of Proper her entire life.	May 3, 2014
12	Meet Michael Knights	Michael Knights, younger brother of Joey Sorrento's best friend Jeff, really admires his older brother but wishes he'd spend more time with him instead of Joey.	May 5, 2014
13	Clancey and Alvin	Mayor Clancey Mahue and Dr. Alvin Cameron, the medical examiner in Proper, have been friends their entire lives. Tonight they have received a call that will change Proper forever.	May 8, 2014
14	Hope and Erin	Hope Rogers and Erin Bodell have been friends through most of their teenage years in Proper. They both survived the Soul & Bones explosion, but the question is, what kind of traumatic effects will the event have on them over the long run?	May 8, 2014
15	Meet Lizzy Hinsdale	Lizzy Hinsdale's world revolves around, well, herself. It appears she survived the Soul & Bones explosion, but with most of her "friends" involved in the tragedy, she'll do her best to make it "All About Lizzy."	May 8, 2014
16	Inferno: Part 2	The families and the community of Proper wait to hear news of who has died and who has survived the explosion at the Sorrento's restaurant Soul & Bones.	May 8, 2014
17	News Report #1 with Gayle Hite	Gayle Hite just received word about the explosion and fire in downtown Proper at Soul & Bones.	May 8, 2014
18	Is My Dad Okay?	Victor Moreno, one of the firefighters who responded to the Soul & Bones explosion, had to leave quickly and left his daughter Aria and niece Sarah Campbell alone.	May 14, 2014
19	Frank Holder's Surprise	Frank Holder, Proper's virulent minister, is prepping with youth minister Tim Hill for the coming week's lesson when he receives a call from Guy Walden regarding the explosion at Soul & Bones.	May 16, 2014
20	Brothers & Sisters	As news spreads throughout Proper about the Soul & Bones explosion, Michael Knight, younger brother of Jeff Knight, receives a phone call from his cousin Police Chief Terence Dalton, about the development.	May 21, 2014
21	Meet Samantha Brightman	Samantha Brightman is truly concerned about the welfare of her childhood friend Joey and the fact that he is missing.	May 21, 2014
22	News Report #2 with Gayle Hite	Gayle Hite reports live from Proper General Hospital with updates about the Soul & Bones tragedy as families await news in nearby waiting rooms.	May 22, 2014
23	Margot's Worst Nightmare	Margot has heard news about the Soul & Bones explosion and has been worried about her nephews.	May 22, 2014
24	Nigel and Jedidiah Celebrate	Nigel Holmes and Jedidiah Hall are kicking back at Proper's Hole in the Wall Bar celebrating that they successfully beat Medio Sorrento and left him for dead.	May 22, 2014
25	A Mother's Love	Leona Hall, mother of Torrey and Tommy Hall, has been stoic all night about the developments in Proper surrounding the Soul & Bones explosion.	May 22, 2014

=== Season 3 (2015-2016) ===
No. in season	Title	Plot Summary	Original air date
1	Re-build This City: Part 1	The season 3 premier of Proper Manors picks up with the residents in a special installment of a 5-part episode set 6 months after season 2.	July 24, 2015
2	Re-build This City: Part 2	As the Sorrento's continue with the grand opening of Big Z, the community undergoes some new developments.	August 1, 2015
3	Re-build This City: Part 3	As the grand opening of Big Z continues, Joey's childhood best friend, Rock Marshall, resurfaces, and connects on a deeper level with the Sorrento's. Vedetta and Maria #2 prepare to face off.	September 7, 2015
4	Rebuilt This City: Part 4		January 2, 2016
5	Re-Built This City: Part 5		April 2, 2016
6	A Time For Answers		April 24, 2016
7	A Little Introspection		May 14, 2016
8	Modern Problems		June 8, 2016
9	Reaching Out		June 22, 2016
10	Rumors & Social Clubs		July 15, 2016
11	Sisters Of The Moon		August 15, 2016
12	So Far Away		August 31, 2016
13	Come Away With Me		September 23, 2016
