= Dee Wallace =

American actress (born 1948)

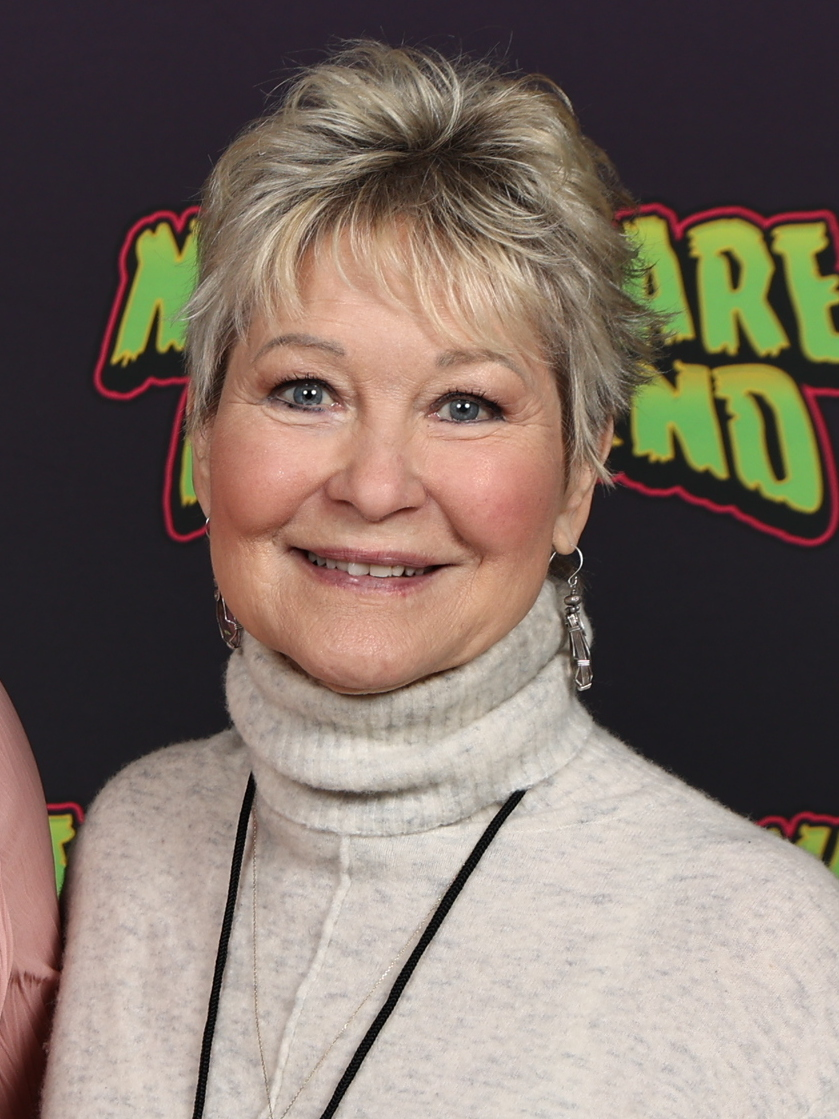
- Wallace at Nightmare Weekend Richmond in 2023
- Born: December 14, 1948 (age 77); Kansas City, Kansas, U.S.
- Other name: Dee Wallace-Stone
- Occupation: Actress
- Years active: 1974–present
- Spouses: Barry Wallace (divorced); Christopher Stone (m. 1980; died 1995)
- Children: Gabrielle Stone
- Website: www.deewallacestone.com

Dee Wallace (née Deanna Lee Bowers; born December 14, 1948), also known as Dee Wallace Stone, is an American actress. She is best known for her role as Mary Taylor in the 1982 blockbuster science-fiction film E.T. the Extra-Terrestrial.

Wallace earned further recognition as a scream queen for starring in several horror films, including The Stepford Wives (1975), The Hills Have Eyes (1977), The Howling (1981), Cujo (1983), Critters (1986), Popcorn (1991), The Frighteners (1996), Halloween (2007), The House of the Devil (2009), and The Lords of Salem (2012).

== Early life ==
Wallace was born in Kansas City, Kansas. Wallace's father developed severe alcoholism before dying by suicide when Wallace was in high school. Her mother was a stage actress and producer who appeared in community-theater productions in Kansas City, which inspired Wallace's interest in acting. She is of German and Irish ancestry.

Wallace graduated from Wyandotte High School.

== Career ==
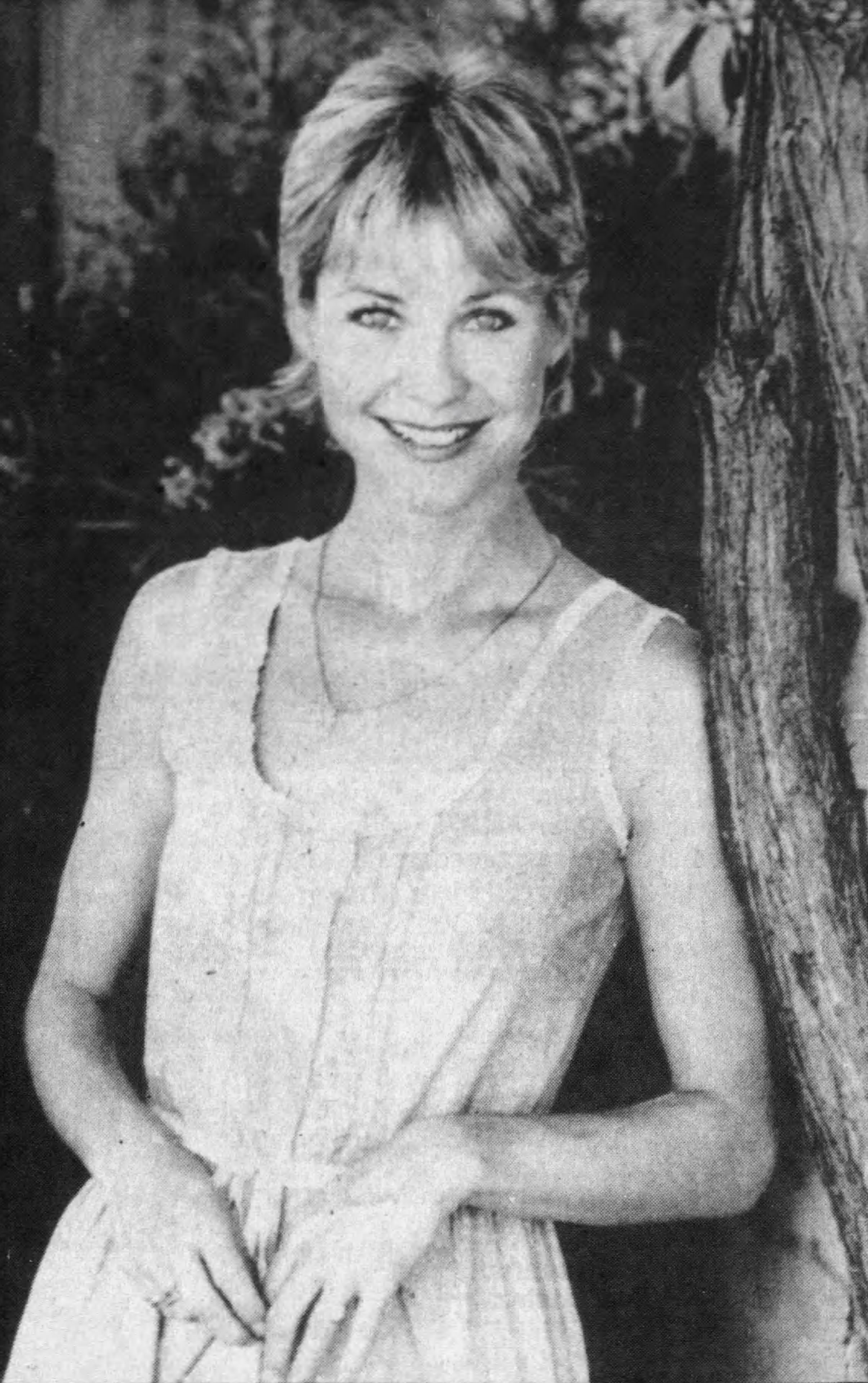
Wallace in 1982

Wallace began her career on television appearing in episodes of The Streets of San Francisco, Starsky & Hutch, and Police Woman, before appearing in the box-office horror hit films The Stepford Wives (1975) and The Hills Have Eyes (1977). In 1981, she played a leading role in the horror film The Howling opposite her husband Christopher Stone. They later starred together in Cujo (1983) based on Stephen King's 1981 novel of the same name.

In 1982, Wallace went on to star in Steven Spielberg's science-fiction film E.T. the Extra-Terrestrial (1982). The film became the highest-grossing film of all time—a record held for 11 years until Jurassic Park, another Spielberg-directed film, surpassed it in 1993. Wallace received a Saturn Award nomination for Best Supporting Actress for her performance at the 10th Saturn Awards. Wallace also starred in a number of comedy films, including 10 (1979), Jimmy the Kid (1982), and Secret Admirer (1985). In 1986, she starred in the horror comedy film Critters (a role she later reprised in a sequel, Critters Attack!, in 2019). She has also appeared in many other horror films, most notably Peter Jackson's The Frighteners (1996), Rob Zombie's remake of Halloween (2007), The House of the Devil (2009), and The Lords of Salem (2012).

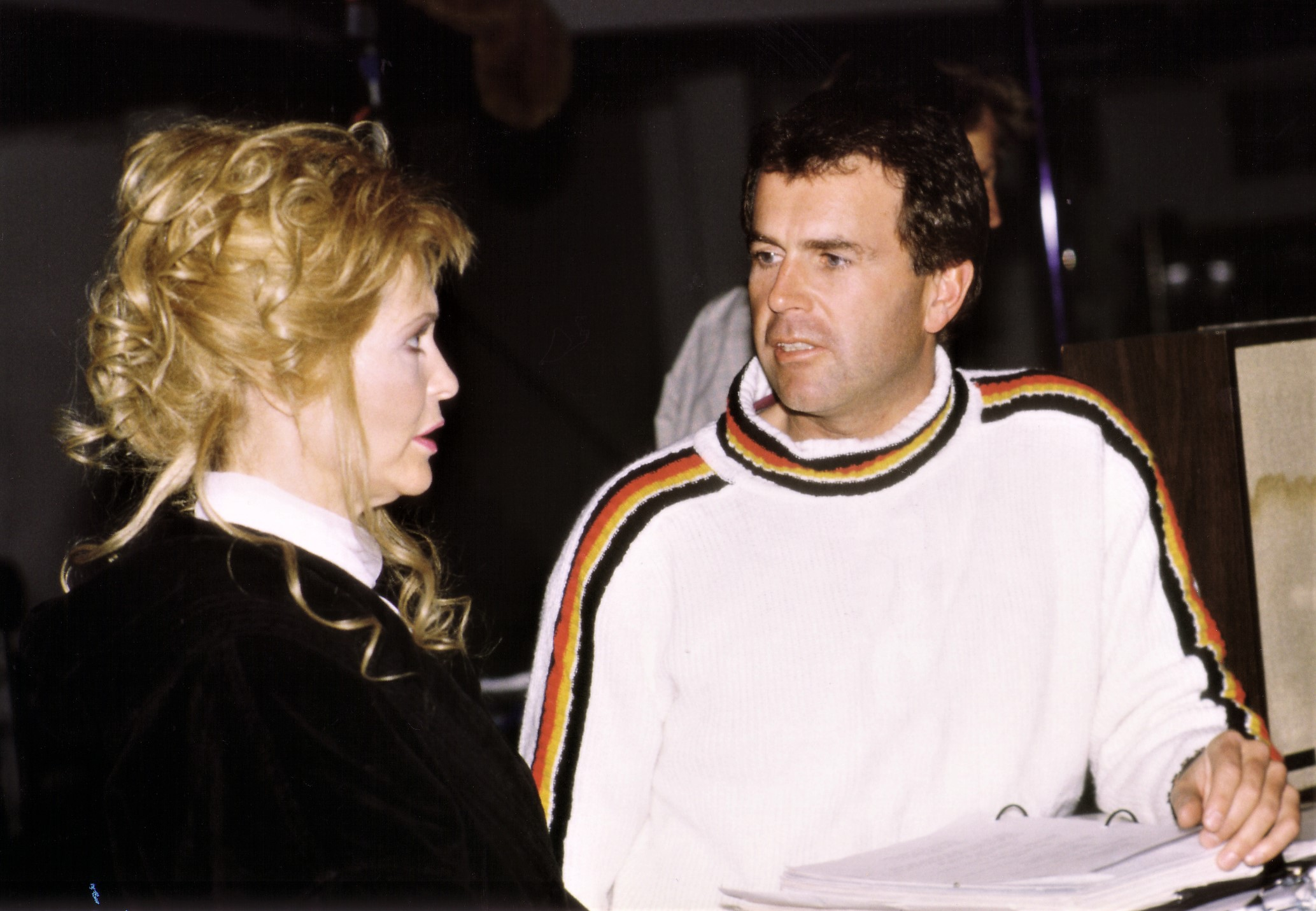
Wallace on the set of Illusion Infinity, with its filmmaker Roger Steinmann

On television, Wallace played a leading role in the CBS sitcom Together We Stand (1986–1987) and the family drama The New Lassie (1989–1992). She guest-starred in episodes of a number of shows, including The Twilight Zone, Hotel, Murder, She Wrote, Touched by an Angel, Bones, Grey's Anatomy, My Name Is Earl, Criminal Minds, and The Office. In 2015, Wallace was cast on the ABC soap opera series General Hospital, as Patricia Spencer, the unseen, long-lost older sister of Luke and Bobbie Spencer; Wallace appeared in the show Supernatural, in the episode titled "Into the Mystic", which aired on January 27, 2016. In 2016, she was nominated for the Daytime Emmy Award for Outstanding Special Guest Performer in a Drama Series at the 43rd Daytime Emmy Awards for her performance in General Hospital.

== Personal life ==
She was briefly married first to Barry Wallace and still uses his surname in her career. Their marriage ended in divorce. She married Christopher Stone in 1980, who died suddenly in 1995. They have one daughter, Gabrielle Stone.

Wallace is a public speaker and self-help author, having written three books, and has her own call-in radio show, in which she talks exclusively about the creation of "self". She often speaks about how one can get through tough times with determination and love. She has also written a book called Bright Light about her life lessons from an acting career. In 2018, she gave her first TED talk at TEDx Cape May, entitled "The Common Ground of Self".

== Selected filmography ==
=== Film ===
Year	Title	Role	Notes
1975	The Stepford Wives	Nettie	
1977	The Hills Have Eyes	Lynne Wood	
1977	All the King's Horses	Sandy Benson	
1979	10	Mary Lewis	
1981	The Howling	Karen White	
1982	E.T. the Extra-Terrestrial	Mary Taylor	
1982	Jimmy the Kid	May Dortmunder	
1983	Cujo	Donna Trenton	
1984	The Shepherd	Anne Blaine	
1985	Secret Admirer	Connie Ryan	
1986	Club Life	Tilly Francesca	
1986	Critters	Helen Brown	
1986	Shadow Play	Morgan Hanna	
1987	Legend of the White Horse	Alta	
1987	Bushfire Moon	Elizabeth O'Day	
1991	Popcorn	Suzanne Butler	
1991	Alligator II: The Mutation	Christine Hodges	
1991	Rock-A-Doodle	Dory	Voice role
1992	Rescue Me	Sarah Sweeney	
1993	Lightning in a Bottle	Jean Markley	
1993	My Family Treasure	Alex Danieloff	
1993	Alone in the Dark	Linda Grant	Short film
1994	Huck and the King of Hearts	Darlene	
1994	The Skateboard Kid 2	Lois Curtis	
1994	Discretion Assured	Kitten	
1995	Best of the Best 3: No Turning Back	Georgia Tucker	
1995	Temptress	Allison Mackie	
1995	The Phoenix and the Carpet	Mother	
1996	Invisible Mom	Laura Griffin	
1996	The Frighteners	Patricia Ann Bradley	
1997	Black Circle Boys	Barbara Sullivan	
1997	Nevada	Ruby	
1997	Mutual Needs	Patricia	
1998	The Christmas Path	Jenny	
1999	Invisible Mom II	Laura Griffin	
1999	Illusion Infinity	Patricia Paradise	
1999	Pirates of the Plain	Glenna	
1999	Deadly Delusions	Susan Randkin	
2000	Big Wind on Campus	Sara	
2000	Flamingo Dreams	Ariel	
2001	Out of the Black	Penny Hart	
2001	Killer Instinct	Sarah Fairchild	
2001	A Month of Sundays	Sarah McCabe	
2001	Adjustments	Jill	Short film
2002	Fish Don't Blink	Dr. Roswell	
2002	Sex and the Teenage Mind	Francine	
2003	Dead Canaries	Sharon Scaldaferi	
2004	Dead End Road	Mrs. Makepiece	
2005	The Loch Ness Monster	Elizabeth Horner	Short film
2005	Scar	Isabella	
2005	Boo	Nurse Russell	
2005	Headspace	Dr. Denise Bell	
2005	Yesterday's Dreams	Rita	
2006	The Lost	Barbara Hanlon	
2006	American Blend	Jayme	
2006	Kalamazoo?	Susan	
2006	Abominable	Ethel Hoss	
2006	Expiration Date	Lucille	
2006	The Plague	Nora	
2007	J-ok'el	Helen Moret	
2007	Bone Dry	Joanne	
2007	Halloween	Cynthia Strode	
2007	The Blue Rose	Mrs. Garrison	
2008	Matchmaker Mary	Aunt Karen	
2008	Little Red Devil	Mother	
2009	Stem Cell	Healer	
2009	Stay Cool	Mrs. McCarthy	
2009	The House of the Devil	Landlady	
2009	The Mother of Invention	Nancy Dooly	
2009	The Haunted World of El Superbeasto	Trixie	Voice role
2009	Dark Fields	Jean Applebe	
2009	Babysitters Beware	Ms. Greene	
2009	The Stalker Within	Barbara	
2009	Happy in the Valley	Gloria	
2010	The Guardian	Mom	Short film
2010	Extraordinary Measures	Sal	
2010	Cage Free	Mrs. Maclean	
2010	Raven	LuAnne	
2010	Bedrooms	Marnie	
2010	Pound of Flesh	Dean Jean Clark	
2010	Between Heaven and Hell	Dr. Isabel Greenlee	Short film
2010	Soupernatural	Mrs. Conners	
2010	Beautysleep Symphony	Spitfire	
2011	Bad Actress	Herself	
2011	Killing Ruth: The Snuff Dialogues	Mrs. Connors	
2011	Exodus Fall	Shirley Minor	
2011	Walk a Mile in My Pradas	Mary	
2011	Exit Humanity	Eve	
2011	Sam Steele and the Crystal Chalice	Ms. Jenkins	
2011	Sebastian	Barbara Sample	
2012	Collision Course	Polly	
2012	Margarine Wars	Dawn Lockwood	
2012	Troubled Child	Elizabeth Logan	
2012	The Lords of Salem	Sonny	
2012	As High as the Sky	Aunt Deborah	Voice role
2012	Aliens from Uranus	Olga	
2013	Hansel & Gretel	Lilith	
2013	Grand Piano	Interviewer	
2013	My Stepbrother is a Vampire!?!	Tabitha	Voice role
2013	Bonnie & Clyde: Justified	Emma	
2013	Lucky Charm	Ellie	Short film
2014	The Jazz Funeral	Maggie	
2014	Haunting of Cellblock 11	Ms. Simon	
2014	Cry of the Butterfly	Rebecca	
2014	Ejecta	Ashley Winnington-Ball	
2014	Peter's Ashes	Georgia	Short film
2014	2 Bedroom 1 Bath	Rose	
2014	Love & Mercy	Rosemary	
2014	Between the Sand and the Sky	Sylvia	
2015	ZK: Elephant's Graveyard	Sharon Sommers	
2015	Flowers in December	Hannah	Short film
2015	Polaroid	Ellie	Short film
2016	Red Christmas	Diane	
2016	This Moment	Charlotte	Short film
2016	All Hallows' Eve	Haidy Hallow	
2016	Charlie's Gift	Evelyn	Short film
2017	The Fuzz	Dawn Lockwood	
2017	Death House	Dr. Eileen Fletcher	
2017	Country Road 12	Neighbor	Short film
2017	Ayla	Susan	
2017	This Old Machine	Irene	
2017	Unearthed & Untold: The Path to Pet Sematary	Herself	Documentary film
2018	Closure	The Superior	
2018	Ouija House	Katherine	
2018	Beyond the Sky	Lucille	
2019	Elixir	Teacher	Short film
2019	Dolls	Margaret	
2019	Critters Attack!	Aunt Dee	
2019	After Emma	The Prosecutor	Short film
2019	Renovation of the Heart	Diane Dover	
2019	3 from Hell	Greta	
2019	In Search of Darkness	Herself	Documentary film
2020	Sunrise in Heaven	Marion	
2020	Await the Dawn	Annie	
2020	Stay Home	Dee	Short film
2021	The More We Get Together	Gracie	Voice role; short film
2021	The Nest	Marissa	
2021	13 Fanboy	Herself	
2022	Time Pirates	The Crone	
2022	In Search of Tomorrow	Herself	Documentary film
2022	Jeepers Creepers: Reborn	Marie	
2022	Nix	Donna Coyle	
2022	The Munsters	Good Morning Transylvania Announcer	Voice role
2023	Lena's Dance	Lena Swain	Short film
2023	The Forest Hills	Angela	
2023	Butch Cassidy and the Wild Bunch	Alice Cassidy	
2023	The Little Mermaid	Revina	Voice role
2023	Love by Design	Diane Yeardley	
2023	House of Dolls	Celine Charles	
2023	Roswell Delirium	Betty	
2024	The Legend of Catclaws Mountain	Maggie Porter	
2024	Stream	Linda Spring	
2026	The Licked Hand	Eleanor	
2026	The Boy From Below	Sybil	

=== Television ===
Key
†	Denotes television productions that have not yet been released

Year	Title	Role	Notes
1974	Lucas Tanner	Waitress	Episode: "Merry Gentlemen"
1975	The Streets of San Francisco	Joan Warren	Episode: "The Programming of Charlie Blake"
1975	Ellery Queen	Mamie	Episode: "The Adventure of the Chinese Dog"
1977	Man from Atlantis	Hot Dog Stand Owner	Episode: "Melt Down"
1977	The San Pedro Beach Bums	Lisa	Episode: "Godfather's Five"
1977	Bigfoot and Wildboy	Deeda	Episode: "Amazon Contest"
1977	Starsky & Hutch	Carol Wade	Episode: "The Crying Child"
1977	Police Woman	Shana Fayette	Episode: "Did You Still Beat My Wife"
1977	The Krofft Supershow	Greeda	2 episodes
1978	Barnaby Jones	Amy Vickers	Episode: "Terror on a Quite Afternoon"
1978	Police Story	Sharon Shay	Episode: "A Chance to Live"
1978	Lou Grant	Patti	Episode: "Hooker"
1978–1979	CHiPs	Angy/Sheila	2 episodes
1979	Hart to Hart	Connie	Episode: "Jonathan Hart Jr."
1979	Trapper John, M.D.	Dr. Valerie Tatum	Episode: "The Adventures of the Chinese Dog"
1979	Mrs. Columbo	Janet Rutledge	Episode: "Ladies of the Afternoon"
1979	Young Love, First Love	Leslie	TV movie
1979	Taxi	Joyce	Episode: "Alex Romance"
1980	Skag	Nora	2 episodes
1980	Here's Boomer	Alice	Episode: "Molly"
1980	The Secret War of Jackie's Girls	Maxine	TV movie
1981	A Whale for the Killing	Janet Landon	TV movie
1981	ABC Afterschool Special	Sue Jinkins	Episode: "Run, Don't Walk"
1981	The Five of Me	Ann	TV movie
1981	Child Bride of Short Creek	Mary Jacobs	TV movie
1982	Skeezer	Lucille	TV movie
1982, 1987	CBS Schoolbreak Special	Jan Fischer/Fran Welsh	2 episodes
1983	I Take These Men	Elaine Zakarian	TV movie
1983	Wait till Your Mother Gets Home!	Pat Peters	TV movie
1983	Happy	Marilyn	TV movie
1984	The Sky's No Limit	Dr. Maureen Harris	TV movie
1984	100 Centre Street	Judge Nell Hartigan	TV movie
1984–1987	Hotel	Pamela/Lisa Mason/Helen Johnson	3 episodes
1985	Finder of Lost Loves	Gail Aames	Episode: "Mister Wonderful"
1985	Suburban Beat	Joanna Morgan	TV movie
1985	Simon & Simon	Carol Brooks	Episode: "Love and/or Marriage"
1985	The Twilight Zone	Janice Hammond	Episode: "Wish Bank"
1985	Hostage Flight	Laura Kendrick	TV movie
1986	Sin of Innocence	Vicki McGary	TV movie
1986–1987	Together We Stand	Lori Randall	Main cast
1988	Stranger on My Land	Annie Winters	TV movie
1988	Addicted to His Love	Betty Ann Brennan	TV movie
1989, 1991	Murder, She Wrote	Mildred Terhune/Ellen Wicker	2 episodes
1989–1992	The New Lassie	Dee McCullough	Main cast
1990	I'm Dangerous Tonight	Wanda Thatcher	TV movie
1991	P.S. I Luv U	Mitzi Packer	Episode: "Pilot"
1992	L.A. Law	Eliane Weston	Episode: "Wine Knot"
1992	FBI: The Untold Stories	Darlene	Episode: "Mommie Dearest"
1993	Prophet of Evil: The Ervil LaBaron Story	Jackie Fields	TV movie
1994	Witness to the Execution	Emily Dawson	TV movie
1994	Search and Rescue	Morgan	TV movie
1994	Moment of Truth: Cradle of Conspiracy	Suzanne Guthrie	TV movie
1994	Rebel Highway	Mrs. Gordon	Episode: "Runaway Daughters"
1994	Vanishing Son IV	Megan	TV movie
1995	High Sierra Search and Rescue	Morgan Duffy	Main cast
1995	Here Come the Munsters	Mrs. Walker	TV movie
1995	Brother's Destiny	Mrs. Bastian	TV movie
1996	Subliminal Seduction	Sissy Bonner	TV movie
1997	JAG	Congresswoman Adele DeLong	Episode: "Crossing the Line"
1997	Love's Deadly Triangle: The Texas Cadet Murder	Linda Jones	TV movie
1997	The Perfect Mother	Gina Mitrou	TV movie
1997	Skeletons	Heather Crane	TV movie
1997	Touched by an Angel	Sandra Browner	Episode: "A Delicate Balance"
1998	Bad As I Wanna Be: The Dennis Rodman Story	Pat Rich	TV movie
1999	Nash Bridges	Susan Martin	Episode: "Resurrection"
1999	Ally McBeal	Gail Clarkson	Episode: "Buried Pleasures"
1999	To Love, Honor & Betray	Julia Brennan	TV movie (credited as Dee Wallace Stone)
2001	She's No Angel	Shawnessy	TV movie
2001	Felicity	Allison Covington	2 episodes
2002	The Division	Paula Meeks	Episode: "Beyond the Grave"
2002	She Spies	Daphne	Episode: "First Episode"
2003	The Agency	Doris, Quinn's Sister	Episode: "Our Man in Korea"
2004	The Perfect Husband: The Laci Peterson Story	Sharon Rocha	TV movie
2005	Cold Case	Charlotte Jones	Episode: "Strange Fruit"
2005	Crossing Jordan	Lorraine Heeley	Episode: "Total Recall"
2006	Bones	Special Agent Callie Warner	Episode: "The Woman in Limbo"
2006	Voodoo Moon	Mary-Ann	TV movie
2006	The Eden Formula	Rhonda Sharpton	TV movie
2006	Without a Trace	Lara Duncan	Episode: "All the Sinners, Saints"
2006	Close to Home	Joan Monroe	Episode: "There's Something About Martha"
2006–2007	Sons & Daughters	Colleen Halbert	Main cast
2007	Grey's Anatomy	Joan Waring	Episode: "Time After Time"
2007	My Name Is Earl	The Governor / The Warden's Wife / Katherine Hazelwood	3 episodes
2007	Ghost Whisperer	Claire Taylor	Episode: "Holiday Spirit"
2008	Saving Grace	Janice Shapiro	Episode: "A Survivor Lives Here"
2008	Criminal Minds	Dr. Jan Mohikian	Episode: "Memoriam"
2009	The Magic 7	Sean's Mom (voice)	TV movie
2010	Happy Town	Alice Conroy	Episode: "Blame It on Rio Bravo"
2010	Law & Order: LA	Ellen Powell	Episode: "Sylmar"
2010	Detroit 1-8-7	Marni Eckhart	Episode: "Home Invasion/Drive-By"
2011	The Office	Ellen Bernard	Episode: "Garden Party"
2012	Switched at Birth	Lorena McGowen	2 episodes
2012	Warehouse 13	Ellen Powell	Episode: "Personal Effects"
2014	Grimm	Alice	3 episodes
2015	General Hospital	Patricia Spencer	3 episodes
2015	The Whispers	Willie Starling	Recurring role
2015–2019	Just Add Magic	Grandma Becky Quinn	Main cast
2016	Supernatural	Mildred Baker	Episode: "Into the Mystic"
2017	You're the Worst	Gail	Episode: "It's Been"
2018	Shooter	Katherine Mayfield	Episode: "Swing Vote"
2018	NCIS	Claire Hall	Episode: "Fragments"
2018	Jingle Belle	Shelby	TV movie
2018	Every Other Holiday	Mimi	TV movie
2018	The Wrong Teacher	Dr. Smith	TV movie
2019	The Wrong Mommy	Carol Graham	TV movie
2019	Christmas in Louisiana	Dorothy Winter	TV movie
2020	World's Funniest Animals	Guest	Episode: "102"
2021–2024	9-1-1	Margaret Buckley	6 episodes
2021	ME	Rhonda Karlsson	3 episodes
2023	Paul T. Goldman	Terri Jay	Episode: "Royce"
2023	Fatal Attraction	Emma Rauch	3 episodes
2026	The Boroughs	Grace	Episode: "Welcome to the Boroughs"
