= Haven season 5 =

Haven
- Season 5
- Region 1 DVD cover for both parts
- Starring: Emily Rose; Lucas Bryant; Eric Balfour
- No. of episodes: 26

Release
- Original network: Syfy
- Original release: Part 1: September 11 – December 5, 2014; Part 2: October 8, 2015 – December 17, 2015

Season chronology
- ← Previous; Season 4

The fifth and final season of the American television series Haven premiered on September 11, 2014, on Syfy, and concluded on December 17, 2015. The 26-episode season was split into two parts, containing a total of thirteen episodes each. The first part began its broadcast on September 11, 2014, in its new date and time slot on Thursday at 8:00 pm (ET) for the first four episodes, before returning to its previous time slot of Friday at 7:00 pm (ET). The second part began broadcasting with the first two episodes on October 8, 2015, at 10:00 pm (ET). The show stars Emily Rose, Lucas Bryant and Eric Balfour.

== Cast ==
=== Main ===
- Emily Rose as Audrey Parker / Mara / Lucy Ripley / Paige
- Lucas Bryant as Nathan Wuornos
- Eric Balfour as Duke Crocker

=== Recurring ===
- Richard Donat as Vince Teagues
- John Dunsworth as Dave Teagues
- Adam "Edge" Copeland (credited as both Adam Copeland and WWE Superstar Edge) as Dwight Hendrickson
- Colin Ferguson as William^{a}
- Jayne Eastwood as Gloria Verrano
- Robert Norman Maillet as Heavy
- Laura Mennell as Charlotte Cross
- Paul Braunstein as Mitchell
- Christian (credited as WWE Superstar Christian) as McHugh
- William Shatner as Croatoan^{a}
- Kris Lemche as Seth Byrne
- Rossif Sutherland as Henry / The Sandman
- Tamara Duarte as Hailie Colton
- Gabrielle Trudel as Lizzie Hendrickson

=== Guest ===
- Steve Lund as James Cogan
- Lara Jean Chorostecki as Amy Potter
- Chris Masterson as Morgan Gardener
- Jason Priestley as Chris Brody^{b}
- Maurice Dean Wint as Agent Byron Howard
- Nicole de Boer as Marion Caldwell

a Credited as a special guest star.
b Also credited as a special guest star in "Morbidity".

== Episodes ==
No. overall	No. in season	Title	Directed by	Written by	Original release date	US viewers (millions)
Part 1
53	1	"See No Evil"	Shawn Piller	Matt McGuinness & Gabrielle Stanton	September 11, 2014	1.04
Nathan and Duke learn to cope with the loss of Audrey, who seems to be gone for good after she was hijacked by the evil Mara.
54	2	"Speak No Evil"	Shawn Piller	Matt McGuinness & Gabrielle Stanton	September 18, 2014	1.02
Jennifer's death hits Duke hard. Nathan continues to refuse to believe Mara has defeated Audrey. Dwight is left keeping Haven together.
55	3	"Spotlight"	T. W. Peacocke	Speed Weed & Shernold Edwards	September 25, 2014	0.85
Realizing that Audrey is still alive, Nathan hides Mara from the Guard while Duke and Dwight are left to deal with a trouble that threatens to burn the town to the ground.
56	4	"Much Ado About Mara"	T. W. Peacocke	Speed Weed & Shernold Edwards	October 2, 2014	0.72
Things come to a head between Nathan and Dwight, who is now leading the Guard, as they clash over what to do with Mara. Dwight demands that she end the troubles but Nathan warns him that Audrey's still in there.
57	5	"The Old Switcheroo (Part 1)"	Jeff Ronfroe	Cindy McCreery & Scott Shepherd	October 10, 2014	0.82
Vince and Dave discover a body swapping trouble while in North Carolina to investigate more on Dave's past and the void. The trouble has also affected the people back in Haven.
58	6	"The Old Switcheroo (Part 2)"	Jeff Ronfroe	Cindy McCreery & Scott Shepherd	October 17, 2014	0.95
As Mara capitalizes on the fallout from the latest trouble to strike Haven, Nathan and Duke are forced to take a desperate and dangerous gamble to get Audrey back before she's lost forever.
59	7	"Nowhere Man"	Rob Lieberman	Brian Millikin	October 24, 2014	0.76
While Audrey reconnects with the world that she's now a part of once more, Nathan gets caught in a trouble that causes him to become like a ghost, unable to communicate with anyone except those affected by the same trouble.
60	8	"Exposure"	Rob Lieberman	Nick Parker	October 31, 2014	0.85
Audrey and Duke call upon the help of Seth Byrne to help with the ghost trouble. Meanwhile, Dave and Vince attempt to keep the doctors away from Dave's infected leg, and Duke opens up to Mara about his mother.
61	9	"Morbidity"	Rick Bota	Speed Weed	November 7, 2014	0.79
CDC doctor Charlotte Cross arrives in Haven to investigate the infection on Dave's leg, but ends up getting caught up with events in the town as troubled people in Haven fall sick, causing their troubles to activate.
62	10	"Mortality"	Rick Bota	Adam Higgs	November 14, 2014	0.86
Dwight reveals the secret of the Troubles to Charlotte, and Audrey and Nathan desperately attempt to find a cure for the illness that the Troubled are catching. Meanwhile, Duke frees Mara for his own purposes
63	11	"Reflections"	Grant Harvey	Shernold Edwards	November 21, 2014	0.77
The condition Duke has with the Troubles within him threatens to escalate, so he turns to Mara for help, the only person who can save him. Meanwhile, Audrey's illness grows stronger while she attempts to deal with a new Trouble.
64	12	"Chemistry"	Grant Harvey	Y. Shireen Razack	November 28, 2014	0.87
When Mara is abducted, Duke searches for her, which causes him to meet up by chance with Nathan. Vince and Audrey continue to try to dig into Charlotte's life to obtain the proof that she is not who she claims to be.
65	13	"Chosen"	Shawn Piller	Matt McGuiness	December 5, 2014	0.91
As Audrey begins to learn the truth about the origins of her and Mara, she leads a manhunt to track down Mara before hundreds of new troubles are unleashed upon the town due to Duke's curse. Charlotte, wrongly believing that Mara has turned off Duke's curse, combines Mara and Audrey into one body, eliminating Mara. Duke's trouble is released.
Part 2
66	14	"New World Order"	Shawn Piller	Brian Millikin & Nick Parker	October 8, 2015	0.75
Now with Mara gone, Duke's troubles escalate and erupt, affecting all of Haven and with a shroud around the town, outsiders don't have a clue about Haven.
67	15	"Power"	Rick Bota	Adam Higgs	October 8, 2015	0.55
Two weeks since the new troubles have begun, the Haven citizens seek shelter at a school from a killer who murders in the dark. Nathan, Charlotte, Dave and Kira travel to the power plant in hopes of getting the generators started. Using the Rougarou device, Nathan finds a cavern full of Aether. Once they return from the plant, Kira is presumed to be dead and Nathan is found responsible for her death. Duke bumps into an old friend, Hailie, who does not remember Haven. Hailie confides in him she has financial problems, and begs him to activate her walking through walls trouble. Duke reluctantly complies.
68	16	"The Trial of Nathan Wuornos"	Rick Bota	Speed Weed	October 15, 2015	0.70
Nathan is on trial for Kira's death. Her fiancé Tony, seeks justice, using personal info against Nathan, which Tony had mysteriously found. It is revealed Kira is alive but trapped at the Aether cavern. Nathan sends Charlotte and Dwight to rescue Kira. A new trouble sends Havenites to sleep. Duke and Hailie set out to rob a bank, despite Duke's worries regarding Hailie and her newfound trouble. After being caught, Duke is splashed with her blood, and she must escape from his madness.
69	17	"Enter Sandman"	Lucas Bryant	Shernold Edwards	October 22, 2015	0.59
Audrey, Charlotte and Grayson (among other people) are trapped inside The Sandman's world and must find a way out. The Sandman is obsessed with Audrey and wants to make her his wife. After his last trouble stint, Duke is found locked in a shipping container and is rescued by his old friend Seth, who does not remember him or Haven. Duke eventually jogs Seth memory and they set out for an adventure to North Carolina to find help and answers.
70	18	"Wild Card"	Lee Rose	Brian Millikin & Nick Parker	October 29, 2015	0.65
Dave's vision of Croatoan sends him out with Vince to see if the lady in his vision is still alive. Audrey, Nathan, Dwight and Charlotte almost meet their demise when a new Tarot card trouble hits Haven. Nathan finds the fortune teller, Lainey, only to realize she didn't draw the cards for them, but Croatoan did. Duke meets a stranger in North Carolina, who tells him his family bloodline was collecting troubles for the Croatoan. Audrey and Charlotte eventually get the first piece needed to build the barn but Charlotte is found dead after Croatoan, her husband, attacks her.
71	19	"Perditus"	Lee Rose	Gabrielle Stanton & Adam Higgs	November 5, 2015	0.80
After Charlotte's death, Audrey, Nathan and Dwight are desperate for answers. Nathan heads out for a seance with Lainey's sister, Ona, in hopes of speaking with Charlotte's spirit. With no luck, he sets out to leave, only to bump into Lainey's deceased husband, Herbert. Ona admits her trouble isn't communicating with the dead but rather resurrecting them. Nathan and Dwight agree to bring Charlotte back from the dead, only later to realize the serious repercussions of the troubles; the newly resurrected are turning into the undead. Charlotte must sacrifice herself again in order to not turn into a zombie. Before she dies, she instructs Audrey, Nathan and Dwight on how to build a new barn and who Croatoan really is. Duke has a vision of post-apocalyptic Haven, where almost everyone is dead. To prevent his vision from becoming reality, Duke leaves Seth behind and heads back on the road to Haven. The Teagues discover Charlotte's CDC bag. However, Audrey, Nathan and Dwight overhear this and reveal that it was Dave who took the bag and murdered Charlotte.
72	20	"Just Passing Through"	Colin Ferguson	Sam Ernst & Jim Dunn	November 12, 2015	0.72
Nathan questions Dave over the murder of Charlotte, whom he believes is responsible, only to discover vital information from him including that Dave is possessed by Croatoan. Dave talks about a woman who was present during the demise of the Colorado Kid, whom no one can identify. Nathan and Vince travel back in time to 1983, using Stuart Mosley's trouble to find the mystery woman. It is revealed that the woman is Hailie's mother, Barbara Colton, a petty criminal who had stolen Lucy's ring and can now create thinnies with her phasing trouble. Before they can reach Barbara, Dave, possessed by the Croatoan, murders James. On his way back to Haven, Duke is attacked by men dressed in black and receives a letter from 1983, which Nathan had sent to him, asking a favor.
73	21	"Close to Home"	Sudz Sutherland	Joshua Brandon	November 19, 2015	0.66
Duke and Hailie return to Haven in hopes of Hailie opening a thinny so Nathan can travel to the void and get the controller, the last piece needed for the new barn. Duke encounters Lisa, a woman who wants revenge, so he and Audrey must calm her before she destroys anything else. While in the void, Nathan has an unpleasant reunion with William who has been stuck in the Void since Audrey banished him. He leads Nathan to the old wreck that was once the barn, so Nathan can get the controller and so William can reunite with Mara on the other side, unbeknownst to him that she is gone. Vince, Dave and Dwight eventually come across Boyd, a man with an exorcism trouble, hoping it will release Croatoan out of Dave. Audrey and Duke talk through to Lisa by explaining the troubles will end soon. However, Hailie does not want them to end since her newfound "power" can rake in money. William realizes Nathan lied about Mara still reigning over Haven and attempts to kill him. Just before Nathan can escape the void, Hailie closes the thinny, leaving him trapped with William.
74	22	"A Matter of Time"	Sudz Sutherland	Brian Millikin	November 26, 2015	0.53
Nathan and William are stuck in the cave after a cave in. A boulder is blocking the way to the thinny, that is now closed up. William himself is stuck under a boulder. They see aether seeping in from a crack and William convinces Nathan to get him some. Meanwhile Hailie gets stuck in an iron gate, mortally wounded. Duke and Audrey are not able to convince her to open the thinny. Duke ends up releasing her from her suffering and using his trouble to absorb Hailie's trouble and open the thinny. William uses the aether to conjure up a familiar minion to remove the boulder and when the thinny opens up he decides to let Nathan go. Nathan is safe and leaves William a parting gift, so he can return to his realm. Meanwhile, Vince, Dave and Dwight are trying hypnosis to let Dave fight Croatoan in his own mind. However, Maddie ends up dead and they learn Croatoan has been collecting the aether so he can emerge from Dave on his own. That time is coming very near. Dave realizes his weakness and takes away his mind-wiping ability, but is killed by Croatoan in the process. Then Croatoan escapes his mouth as a greenish cloud. Vince and Dwight find a message on Dave's arm he wrote on the notepad while fighting Croatoan which reads, "He's coming for Audrey".
75	23	"Blind Spot"	T.W. Peacocke	Y. Shireen Razack	December 3, 2015	0.62
Whilst trying to regain control of the Haven Police Station, in order to set up for a base of operations, Audrey and Nathan investigate a mysterious killer, who is leaving a wake of bodies around town. Hoping that the worst of the troubles are over, the people of Haven start to leave their houses.
76	24	"The Widening Gyre"	T.W. Peacocke	Nick Parker	December 10, 2015	0.74
Nathan and Dwight race against time to rescue Audrey from Croatoan. However the consequences of Duke's dark destiny wreak havoc on their plans. To save Haven, Vince contemplates an unusual sacrifice. Realizing that everyone must deal with Duke's dark destiny, means that they must contemplate doing the only thing they don't want to do.
77	25	"Now"	Shawn Piller	Gabrielle Stanton	December 17, 2015	0.68
In the face of mounting obstacles, Haven's heroes struggle to rebuild the barn. The arrival of Mara's father, Croatoan, to Haven has everyone asking questions about his real intentions. Audrey attempts to save Duke while Duke is forced to give in to his worst fear. Dwight is tempted by a surprise gift, whilst Nathan must consider a devastating sacrifice. It will be a sacrifice that will save Haven but destroy the woman he loves, once and for all. Croatoan continues to try and reason with the group, wanting them to rebuild the barn, but he has ulterior motives.
78	26	"Forever"	Shawn Piller	Matt McGuiness	December 17, 2015	0.53
Whilst Nathan struggles to return home to Haven, from the netherworld he's been pushed into, Dwight reconsiders his future, as his past and present seem to collide all at the same point. Realizing that she can save the town from Croatoan, Audrey must work closely with him to make a great sacrifice. Nathan makes it back to Haven with the help of Dwight, who was led to him by a ghostly Duke. Audrey and Nathan's reunion is cut short when Croatoan accidentally knocks Nathan with an aether spear. Audrey lashes out at him and asks if he would ever make the same sacrifice Nathan just did. Realizing how far he's fallen, Croatoan revives Nathan and consents to go into the Barn and end the Troubles. Vince reveals that the Aether in Croatoan isn't enough and that a catalyst is needed to charge the new barn with love. Audrey agrees to go back into the Barn with them, saying goodbye to Nathan forever and extracting the Troubles from everyone around the world. A month later, Gloria tells Nathan the genetic markers Charlotte discovered are gone from everyone she's tested: the Troubles are finally gone for good. As Nathan heads out for a day off, he is stunned to meet "Paige" and her son James broken down by the side of the road, Audrey and the Colorado Kid apparently returned to him. In the Barn, Vince explains to Croatoan that while it was impossible to let her out as Audrey, it was a simple matter for her to come back as someone else, knowing that no matter who she is, she and Nathan would fall in love again. However, this time around both will be able to have the life they hoped to have, with them being able to raise their son themselves.

== Production ==
On January 28, 2014, Syfy ordered a 26-episode fifth season. This season was split up into two half-seasons due to an increase in the Canadian budget that brought to a total of $28 million instead of the usual $14 million for a single season. The first 13 episodes aired in late 2014 while the remaining 13 aired in late 2015. Production for both parts lasted from April 22, 2014, to December 2014.

Originally set to join lead-in WWE Smackdown on Thursdays after both shows were moved from Friday nights, the first half of season 5 was moved to 8/7c at the last minute due to the delay of Smackdown before returning to Fridays at 7/6c before Smackdown and Z Nation. Unlike the first half, the second half returned to its 10/9c slot where it once again aired after Smackdown on Thursdays.

Laura Mennell was cast as worldly scientist Charlotte Cross (formerly Erin Reid) who uncovers a possible cure to the Troubles. Eric Balfour confirmed Emma Lahana's departure due to family emergency, leading to her character being written off, a fate that was revealed in "Speak No Evil" even though she was originally not going to be killed. Kris Lemche and Jason Priestley returned to guest star. In addition, Adam "Edge" Copeland's real-life best friend (and former WWE tag team partner) Jay "Christian" Reso guest starred for one episode and is slated to appear in a couple more in the second half. William Shatner appeared in the second half of season 5 in a pivotal role that has the potential to forever impact the fate of the town of Haven and its troubled residents.

It was announced that Lucas Bryant would make his directorial debut in the seventeenth episode of the season, originally titled "Look" before it was changed to "Enter Sandman".

Showrunner and executive producer Gabrielle Stanton explained that the team was already prepared for the end after they filmed both parts of the fifth season in 2014 when Haven's cancellation was announced in August 2015, but promised that the final episode would satisfy fans. She also said that they looked at the remaining thirteen episodes as if it is indeed the last because they didn't want to leave it on a giant cliffhanger just in case Haven isn't coming back. However, a year prior to the cancellation, season five being the show's last was first hinted by Eric Balfour when he told TVLine that one of the producers was considering about shooting two different endings at the time production was still filming.

The show's Canadian channel Showcase premiered the mid-season premiere episode "New World Order" at the 2015 Fan Expo Canada on September 7, 2015, a month prior to its public premiere.

== Home media release ==
Season 5, Vol. 1
Set details	Special features	
13 episodes; 4-disc set; 1.78:1 aspect ratio; Subtitles: English; English (Dolby Digital 5.1 Surround); English (Master Audio 5.1 Surround) – Blu-ray	Thirteen "Inside Haven" Featurettes; Haven Origins: Witches Are Born; Haven Origins: Native Breaks Free; Audio Commentaries	
DVD release dates
Region 1	Region 2	Region 4
September 8, 2015	TBA	TBA
The Final Season
Set details	Special features	
13 episodes; 4-disc set; 1.78:1 aspect ratio; Subtitles: English; English (Dolby Digital 5.1 Surround); English (Master Audio 5.1 Surround) – Blu-ray	Thirteen "Inside Haven" Featurettes; Thirteen Audio Commentary Tracks; Interviews with Eric Balfour, Lucas Bryant, William Shatner, Adam Copeland & Producer Shawn Piller; Mythology Refresher; Haven Revisited: Livestream Segments with the Cast & Crew; Haven Archives: Entries from the Crocker Diaries; Haven Origins: Lovers Conquered All; Haven Origins: Trust Kills Fear	
DVD release dates
Region 1	Region 2	Region 4
April 19, 2016	TBA	TBA
