= Love, Danielle =

- Directed by: Marianna Palka
- Written by: Steve Sears; Devin Sidell
- Produced by: Joanna Kerns; Steve Morris; Amy Byer Shainman; Robin Conly; Steve Sears; Devin Sidell
- Starring: Devin Sidell; Jaime King; Lesley Ann Warren; Michael Roark; Barry Bostwick; Ian Owens; Marianna Palka; Larry Clarke; Raymond Cruz; Kim Coles; Kelly Jenrette
- Cinematography: Hana Kitasei
- Edited by: Alexandra Scratch
- Music by: Michael Teoli
- Production companies: Freestyle Digital Releasing; Lady Parts Productions; BRCA Responder
- Release dates: October 2024 (Heartland Film Festival); October 3, 2025 (digital)
- Running time: 78 minutes
- Country: United States
- Language: English

Love, Danielle is an American dramedy film co-written by Devin Sidell and produced by Amy Byer Shainman. The film centers on a woman who carries a BRCA gene mutation and must decide whether to undergo preventive surgeries—such as a mastectomy and oophorectomy—to reduce her risk of developing cancer. The cast includes Devin Sidell, Jaime King, Lesley Ann Warren, Michael Roark, Barry Bostwick, Ian Owens, Marianna Palka, Larry Clarke, Raymond Cruz, Kim Coles, and Kelly Jenrette.

The film draws on Sidell’s personal experiences with the BRCA-1 gene mutation. In 2016, she underwent a preventive oophorectomy and hysterectomy while her sister was receiving treatment for breast cancer. Her family has a notable history of cancer, with her mother surviving both ovarian and breast cancer, and her aunt dying from ovarian cancer. In 2017, Sidell chose to have a preventive double mastectomy. Footage of her post-surgical scars and tissue expanders—filmed prior to her reconstructive surgery—was incorporated into Love, Danielle, offering a visual representation of the physical and emotional realities associated with BRCA-related decisions.

== Plot ==
When Danielle tests positive for a BRCA-1 gene mutation, she learns that this puts her at a very high risk of developing breast and ovarian cancer. Her older sister, Amy, is already undergoing chemotherapy for breast cancer. Danielle now contemplates preemptively removing her "ticking time bomb" breasts and reproductive organs before cancer gets her, too. Her decision-making process involves flashbacks of her childhood with absent parents, bizarre anesthesia-induced dreams, and toxic confrontations with her recovering alcoholic mother and self-absorbed 70's TV Western star father. Ultimately, Danielle must figure out how to prioritize her health and well-being by putting herself first.

== Cast ==
- Devin Sidell as Danielle
  - Elizabeth Last as Young Danielle
- Jaime King as Amy
  - Mallory Maurer as Young Amy
- Lesley Ann Warren as Candie
- Michael Roark as Pat
- Barry Bostwick as Bryce
- Ian Owens as Rob
- Marianna Palka as Misty
- Larry Clarke as Dr. Morgan
- Raymond Cruz as Stan DeManuel
- Kim Coles as Ellen
- Kelly Jenrette as Char
- Malina Galabova as Counseling Nurse
- Kayla Topp as Mammography Nurse
- Patrick Day as Dr. Davies
- Andrew Perez as Pirate
- Tim Lounibos as Todd
- Andres Paul Ramacho as CNA Edwards
- Anthony Sorrells as CNA Finn

== Production ==
Love, Danielle was directed by Marianna Palka and written by Steve Sears and Devin Sidell. Producers include Joanna Kerns, Steve Morris, Amy Byer Shainman, Robin Conly, Steve Sears, and Devin Sidell. Cinematography was by Hana Kitasei, editing by Alexandra Scratch, and music by Michael Teoli. Lady Parts Productions and BRCA Responder produced the film.

== Accolades ==
Award	Year	Category	Recipient(s)	Result
Garden State Film Festival	2025	Best Actress in a Feature	Devin Sidell	Nominated
Garden State Film Festival	2025	Best Supporting Actress in a Feature	Jaime King	Nominated
Garden State Film Festival	2025	Best Supporting Actor in a Feature	Barry Bostwick	Nominated
Garden State Film Festival	2025	Best Ensemble in a Feature	Love, Danielle	Nominated
Toronto International Women’s Film Festival	2025	Best Narrative Feature	Love, Danielle	Won
Phoenix Film Festival	2025	Best Screenplay	Love, Danielle	Won
WorldFest Houston	2025	Best Actress	Devin Sidell	Nominated
WorldFest Houston	2025	Best Supporting Actress	Lesley Ann Warren	Won
WorldFest Houston	2025	Best Supporting Actor	Barry Bostwick	Nominated
WorldFest Houston	2025	Gold Comedy Feature	Love, Danielle	Won
Nevada Women’s Film Festival	2025	Best Feature Film	Love, Danielle	Won
Woods Hole Film Festival	2025	Best Feature Film	Love, Danielle	Nominated
Mystic Film Festival	2025	Best Narrative Feature	Love, Danielle	Won
Awareness Film Festival	2025	Grand Jury Award for Narrative Feature	Love, Danielle	Won
