= Larry Clark (disambiguation) =

Larry Clark is an American film director.

Larry Clark may also refer to:

- Larry Clark (filmmaker, born 1948)
- Larry Clark (Kentucky politician) (born 1945)
- Larry Clark (musician), founding member of the rock band The Monks

== See also ==
- Laurence Clark (disambiguation)
- Larry Clarke (1925–2015), Canadian businessman
