= List of The Mindy Project episodes =

The Mindy Project is an American romantic comedy television series created by Mindy Kaling that aired on Fox for three seasons from September 25, 2012, to March 24, 2015. The fourth season began on September 15, 2015, on Hulu. The series stars Kaling as Mindy Lahiri, a young OB/GYN, as she navigates through her professional life and romantic relationships.

On May 6, 2015, the series was canceled on Fox. On May 15, 2015, Hulu announced it had picked up the series for a 26-episode season 4, with the option of future seasons. On May 4, 2016, Hulu announced it had picked up the series for a 16-episode season 5, which was later reduced to 14. On March 29, 2017, The Mindy Project was renewed for a sixth and final season, which premiered on September 12, 2017. During the course of the series, 117 episodes of The Mindy Project were released over six seasons, between September 25, 2012, and November 14, 2017.

== Series overview ==
Season	Episodes	Originally released		
Season	Episodes	First released	Last released	Network
1	24	September 25, 2012	May 14, 2013	Fox
2	22	September 17, 2013	May 6, 2014	Fox
3	21	September 16, 2014	March 24, 2015	Fox
4	26	September 15, 2015	July 5, 2016	Hulu
5	14	October 4, 2016	March 28, 2017	Hulu
6	10	September 12, 2017	November 14, 2017	Hulu

== Episodes ==
=== Season 1 (2012–13) ===
No. overall	No. in season	Title	Directed by	Written by	Original release date	U.S. viewers (millions)
1	1	"Pilot"	Charles McDougall	Mindy Kaling	August 27, 2012 (online); September 25, 2012 (Fox)	4.67
Mindy Lahiri is introduced as an OB/GYN trying to find love in New York City with the help of her eccentric friends and co-workers.
2	2	"Hiring and Firing"	Michael Spiller	Mindy Kaling	October 2, 2012	3.68
When Dr. Schulman realizes Beverly is a terrible nurse, he assigns Mindy and Danny to hire a new nurse, and they cannot agree on whom to hire. Jeremy on the other hand is assigned to fire Beverly and simply cannot bring himself to do it.
3	3	"In the Club"	Michael Spiller	Matt Warburton	October 9, 2012	3.55
Mindy and the others go clubbing for a night and learn that cold Dr. Castellano is actually a stellar dancer and ladies' man. Mindy also discovers that Shauna is harboring some hidden feelings for Danny.
4	4	"Halloween"	Jesse Peretz	Chris McKenna	October 30, 2012	3.12
Mindy wrestles with whether or not she should take things one step further with her new beau Josh. Danny and Jeremy visit the DMV to take the driver's test, a task Danny has failed countless times in the past.
5	5	"Danny Castellano Is My Gynecologist"	Peter Lauer	Mindy Kaling	November 13, 2012	3.17
When Mindy's gynecologist retires, she and Danny bet on who will back out first if Danny were to be her new gynecologist.
6	6	"Thanksgiving"	Michael Spiller	Adam Countee	November 20, 2012	2.64
Mindy is shocked to learn that Josh may not want to be exclusive with her. Things go even more awry when Mindy runs into an ex and his "new Indian girlfriend" at Gwen's Thanksgiving party.
7	7	"Teen Patient"	Rob Schrab	Ike Barinholtz & David Stassen	November 27, 2012	2.76
When Mindy encourages a teenager in her building to take things slowly in the romance department, she is forced to reflect on her own relationship with Josh. Danny is concerned about an anonymous complaint he receives at the office.
8	8	"Two to One"	Peter Lauer	Mindy Kaling	December 4, 2012	2.68
The practice is being threatened by a midwives center in the same building, so Mindy sets out to win her old patients back and gain more respect from Danny and Jeremy.
9	9	"Josh and Mindy's Christmas Party"	Charles McDougall	Jeremy Bronson	December 11, 2012	3.07
Mindy comes to a shocking realization about her seemingly perfect relationship with Josh at her annual Christmas party.
10	10	"Mindy's Brother"	Michael Spiller	Chris McKenna	January 8, 2013	2.85
Mindy's brother comes to NYC to visit his older sister and all is well until he informs her that he will be dropping out of Stanford to pursue a rap career. Danny and Jeremy are at odds with their landlord's successor, his spoiled son.
11	11	"Bunk Bed"	Don Scardino	Jeremy Bronson	January 15, 2013	2.76
When Gwen breaks her arm and has to go to the emergency room, Mindy helps out by watching Gwen's daughter Riley for the day. Meanwhile, Danny has an interesting experience with another patient in the emergency room lobby and Shauna, Morgan, and Betsy discover the reason Danny and his wife divorced.
12	12	"Hooking Up Is Hard"	Paul Lieberstein	Mindy Kaling	January 22, 2013	3.05
Mindy starts an interesting, secret relationship with Brendan Deslaurier (Mark Duplass), one of the midwives. Danny and Eye Patch go out on a date.
13	13	"Harry & Sally"	Michael Spiller	Mindy Kaling & B. J. Novak	January 29, 2013	3.20
Mindy meets a great guy at a party but has suspicions about his extremely close relationship with his girl best friend. Danny tries to win back Eye Patch after she dumps him for being too self-absorbed.
14	14	"Harry & Mindy"	Michael Weaver	Harper Dill	February 5, 2013	3.60
It's Valentine's Day and Mindy and Danny find themselves in a love triangle. Morgan turns to Jeremy for help picking up a girl he likes.
15	15	"Mindy's Minute"	B. J. Novak	Ike Barinholtz & David Stassen	February 19, 2013	3.05
Mindy starts doing a new educational segment for taxi cab TV and turns to Danny for on-screen coaching. Beverly returns to the office as a secretary.
16	16	"The One That Got Away"	Michael Spiller	Mindy Kaling & Jeremy Bronson	February 26, 2013	3.26
Mindy is thrilled when her fling from a Jewish summer camp she attended as a kid returns to NYC. However, she soon learns that she only has a day to spend with him before he must leave on a U.S. Army deployment to Afghanistan again.
17	17	"Mindy's Birthday"	Claire Scanlon	Adam Countee	March 19, 2013	3.07
Mindy did not want a birthday party, and after her friends throw her an annoying dinner party with insulting gifts, she storms out and ends up on an odyssey involving a table of mean girls and the surprising return of ex-nurse Beverly. Danny and Jeremy both like Mindy's friend and Danny decides he is not going to step aside and let his handsome colleague simply win the girl.
18	18	"Danny's Friend"	Beth McCarthy-Miller	Matt Warburton	March 26, 2013	2.62
Mindy unknowingly starts seeing Danny's friend from Staten Island and Danny tries everything he can to stop it when he finds out.
19	19	"My Cool Christian Boyfriend"	Michael Spiller	Jack Burditt	April 2, 2013	2.47
A young Christian minister takes an interest in Mindy until he realizes they value different things in life.
20	20	"Pretty Man"	Rob Schrab	Tucker Cawley	April 4, 2013	3.24
Mindy has an interesting night with a man she meets at a bar, until she realizes he is a male prostitute. Things go awry at Danny's party as a result.
21	21	"Santa Fe"	B. J. Novak	Tracey Wigfield	April 9, 2013	2.66
The associates go to Santa Fe for a medical conference and Mindy gets a chance to find closure with Josh. Things do not go as planned for Jeremy and Morgan's presentation.
22	22	"Triathlon"	Wendey Stanzler	Jack Burditt	April 30, 2013	2.56
Danny fires Morgan from the practice, and consequently loses a member of the team for the triathlon. Mindy volunteers to replace him, and quickly regrets her actions. Meanwhile, Morgan begins working for the Deslaurier Brothers, which further increases the rivalry between the two practices.
23	23	"Frat Party"	Michael Weaver	Tracey Wigfield	May 7, 2013	2.61
Mindy takes on a young medical student to pass on her wisdom to, and soon finds herself at a college frat party, where an encounter with a former flame has disastrous consequences. Meanwhile, Danny and Jeremy go to great lengths to try to get Morgan to return to Shulman & Associates.
24	24	"Take Me with You"	Michael Spiller	Mindy Kaling & Jeremy Bronson	May 14, 2013	2.57
Mindy makes the bold decision to move to Haiti with Casey for a year, much to the amusement of her co-workers. In order to prove that she can survive in rough conditions, Mindy invites herself and Casey on a camping trip with Danny and his ex-wife, Christina, with whom he has recently reconciled.

=== Season 2 (2013–14) ===
No. overall	No. in season	Title	Directed by	Written by	Original release date	U.S. viewers (millions)
25	1	"All My Problems Solved Forever..."	Michael Spiller	Mindy Kaling	September 17, 2013	3.83
Mindy returns from Haiti for an emergency surgery. She meets Dr. Paul Leotard (James Franco) and must decide what she wants to do: stay in New York or go back to Haiti.
26	2	"The Other Dr. L"	Michael Spiller	Jack Burditt	September 24, 2013	2.94
Mindy challenges Paul for a chance to win back her old office. Danny joins a support group to help him get over his breakup with Christina.
27	3	"Music Festival"	Michael Weaver	Matt Warburton	October 1, 2013	2.86
Casey has an identity crisis after returning from Haiti and decides to become a DJ. When Mindy and her colleagues attend a music festival where he is performing, the freewheeling atmosphere leads to one mishap after another. Meanwhile, a new doctor (Adam Pally) wants to join the practice.
28	4	"Magic Morgan"	Neal Brennan	Tracey Wigfield	October 8, 2013	2.89
Morgan says that anyone who sleeps with him will find the love of their life immediately afterward. Mindy offers to test Morgan's theory but backs out at the last minute, much to Morgan's embarrassment. This causes him to hire lawyer, Cliff Gilbert (Glenn Howerton), who files a $200,000 lawsuit against Mindy for sexual harassment. Mindy is reluctantly persuaded by co-workers into having one date with Morgan to end the lawsuit.
29	5	"Wiener Night"	Michael Weaver	Jack Burditt	October 15, 2013	2.73
Mindy meets and begins dating an Arts and Culture writer named Jason (Ben Feldman). After Jason discerns that Mindy may not be cultured enough for him, she decides to invite him to Christina's art show, which features nude photos of Danny. Danny does not want anyone to see these photos, and asks Cliff to figure out a way to shut down the exhibit.
30	6	"Bro Club for Dudes"	David Rogers	Jeremy Bronson	October 22, 2013	2.69
After several failed attempts at bonding with Peter, Mindy joins the other doctors in attending his debut MMA match to show her support. Morgan tries to ask Tamra out on the day of her anniversary with Ray Ron (Josh Peck) but is disappointed.
31	7	"Sk8er Man"	Beth McCarthy-Miller	Charlie Grandy	November 5, 2013	2.88
When Danny tells Mindy she is too picky and judgmental of other people, she tries to prove him wrong by going on a date with her complete opposite: wild and crazy skateboarder Graham (Timothy Olyphant). Jeremy is distressed when his dad (Alan Dale) visits the practice and prefers Peter over Jeremy.
32	8	"You've Got Sext"	Alex Hardcastle	Mindy Kaling	November 12, 2013	2.66
Mindy loses her purse at the clinic, and decides to spend the night at Danny's apartment. She confesses that she is interested in somebody who works on their floor (Cliff), and Danny suspects that she is talking about him. Meanwhile, Morgan and Peter find Mindy's missing purse and engage in a raunchy text conversation with Cliff using her phone.
33	9	"Mindy Lahiri Is a Racist"	Greg Daniels	Ike Barinholtz & David Stassen	November 19, 2013	2.40
Danny learns that one of his patients is a mommy blogger and allows for her to write a review of Shulman & Associates on her website, but the practice is quickly cast in a racist light after they discover that the review had been posted to a white supremacy blog. Jeremy hires a PR specialist (Jenna Elfman) in order to neutralize their image but things get worse. Meanwhile, Morgan seeks Cliff's forgiveness for not deleting the raunchy texts Cliff sent to Mindy.
34	10	"Wedding Crushers"	Charles McDougall	Lang Fisher	November 26, 2013	2.66
Mindy's philandering ex-boyfriend Josh invites her to his wedding, and in her haste to find a date settles on Peter, who turns out to be an ideal companion—until he makes one huge blunder which puts Mindy on a tightrope. Meanwhile, Danny's younger brother pays a visit and a has a big announcement to make.
35	11	"Christmas Party Sex Trap"	Michael Spiller	Tracey Wigfield	December 3, 2013	2.34
Mindy throws a Christmas bash for all of the building's businesses so she can spend more time with Cliff, but Brendan's date zaps Mindy's holiday spirit with a seductive rendition of "Santa Baby" for the guests.
36	12	"Danny Castellano Is My Personal Trainer"	Rob Schrab	Charlie Grandy	January 7, 2014	2.62
With Danny as her fitness coach, Mindy is determined to get in shape for her winter getaway. Jeremy begins using some of his leftover sick days and places Peter in charge as managing partner in his absence.
37	13	"L.A."	Michael Spiller	Mindy Kaling & Tracey Wigfield	January 14, 2014	2.47
Jeremy sends the rest of the team to an L.A. seminar to get certified for treating a wider, more vain audience. While Danny is concerned about running into his dad during the trip, Mindy bumps into her ex-fiancé, Casey.
38	14	"The Desert"	Marco Fargnoli	Tracey Wigfield & Mindy Kaling	January 21, 2014	3.02
Mindy is determined to fly back to New York immediately to win Cliff back, but is dragged along by a persistent Danny to visit his distant father. Having returned to the office early, Peter and Morgan come across Cliff, who appears to be equally heartbroken.
39	15	"French Me, You Idiot"	Paul Lieberstein	Jack Burditt	April 1, 2014	1.88
Now that she has chosen to pursue her feelings with Danny, Mindy must figure out how to gently end her recently rekindled relationship with Cliff. Peter steps up as a representative for Shulman & Associates in an attempt to take in Lincoln Center dancers as new patients.
40	16	"Indian BBW"	Michael Spiller	Jeremy Bronson	April 1, 2014	1.87
Just as Mindy begins to settle into her relationship with Danny, an old sex tape between her and Tom surfaces online. Danny becomes ill with meningitis.
41	17	"Be Cool"	Rob Schrab	Ike Barinholtz & David Stassen	April 8, 2014	2.26
Danny urges Mindy to keep their romance a secret, which makes her begin to question his intentions. Morgan temporarily moves in with Mindy after learning that her apartment was robbed.
42	18	"Girl Crush"	David Rogers	Chris Schleicher	April 8, 2014	2.33
Mindy deals with her break-up with Danny. Feeling undervalued at Shulman & Associates, Mindy meets famous OB/GYN Sheila Hamilton (Anna Gunn) and flirts with the idea of working at her fancy practice, which caters to rich celebrities and upper class women. Jeremy rents out a medical bus to perform free breast exams for women on the streets of East Harlem.
43	19	"Think Like a Peter"	Ken Whittingham	Charlie Grandy	April 15, 2014	1.95
Peter convinces Mindy to tag along with him to a bar to help her overcome her recent heartbreak. Feeling shunned by Mindy, Danny seeks someone new to talk to at work and turns to Morgan and Tamra after finding out about their scandalous secret.
44	20	"An Officer and a Gynecologist"	David Rogers	Jack Burditt & Lang Fisher	April 22, 2014	2.14
Mindy clashes with a police officer when she gives his daughter birth-control pills. Meanwhile, a rabbi thinks Danny is Jewish when he refers his congregation to the practice.
45	21	"Girl Next Door"	Michael Weaver	Tracey Wigfield & Alina Mankin	April 29, 2014	2.20
Mindy is on the hunt to buy her own apartment space so that she can be completely self-reliant. She agrees to try out Danny's second place, which is right next door to him, but their friendship is put to the test when Mindy decides to have Charlie (Tim Daly) visit. Tired of dating mundane and uncultured women, Peter agrees to stop by Jeremy's place to meet and mingle with his friends.
46	22	"Danny and Mindy"	Michael Spiller	Mindy Kaling	May 6, 2014	2.48
Mindy thinks she has met the man of her dreams after he writes a description of their encounter in a New York newspaper. After a failed attempt at meeting each other, Mindy once again spots whom she believes to be her mystery man but is left with an even bigger reveal.

=== Season 3 (2014–15) ===
No. overall	No. in season	Title	Directed by	Written by	Original release date	U.S. viewers (millions)
47	1	"We're a Couple Now, Haters!"	Michael Spiller	Mindy Kaling	September 16, 2014	2.68
Mindy finds it difficult to keep the details of her and Danny's relationship private from the office, especially after she discovers a surprising secret from Danny's past. Peter grows suspicious of his girlfriend Lauren's (Tracey Wigfield) behavior when she begins organizing a charity event with Jeremy. Morgan's cousin, Lou Tookers (Rob McElhenney), stops by the practice.
48	2	"Annette Castellano Is My Nemesis"	Marco Fargnoli	Tracey Wigfield	September 23, 2014	2.10
Danny's mother, Annette (Rhea Perlman), is in town, and Mindy is determined to win her approval. Meanwhile, Peter convinces Morgan to be more assertive in his relationship with Tamra.
49	3	"Crimes & Misdemeanors & Ex-BFs"	Michael Weaver	Matt Warburton	September 30, 2014	2.35
After it is revealed that Mindy has been committing tax fraud for years, she seeks Cliff's help to clear her name and save the practice. Peter faces off against Jeremy to win back Lauren's affection.
50	4	"I Slipped"	Lynn Shelton	Charlie Grandy	October 7, 2014	2.19
Danny tries something new in bed that horrifies Mindy, and she begins to worry she is not exciting enough sexually. Morgan is disappointed when none of his coworkers show up to celebrate his graduation from the nurse practitioner's program. Jeremy finds out everyone in the office is "Team Peter" with regards to their falling out over Lauren.
51	5	"The Devil Wears Lands' End"	Michael Spiller	Jeremy Bronson	October 14, 2014	2.21
After first getting the practice into big trouble with Dr. Jean Fishman (Niecy Nash), the new head of obstetrics, Mindy makes matters even worse when the two spend time alone together. Despite their ongoing feud, Peter must learn to work with Jeremy when he realizes his beer pong skills will be a necessity for an upcoming Dartmouth Alumni matchup against Shonda Rhimes.
52	6	"Caramel Princess Time"	Beth McCarthy-Miller	Charlie Grandy & Mindy Kaling	November 4, 2014	2.84
Danny's plan to teach Mindy the importance of being on time backfires when Dr. Fishman steps in. Tamra and Morgan set Peter up on a blind date with Tamra's "twin," Abby (Allison Tolman).
53	7	"We Need to Talk About Annette"	Michael Weaver	Alina Mankin	November 11, 2014	2.47
Mindy catches Danny's mom shoplifting and must figure out how to bring this to his attention. Mindy accidentally accusing Annette about stealing the jacket to gives to Danny. Peter struggles to find balance between his adult life and his new laid back friend, Abby.
54	8	"Diary of a Mad Indian Woman"	Alex Hardcastle	Lang Fisher	November 18, 2014	2.37
Mindy's plan to have Danny stay at her place are interrupted when Dr. Fishman asserts that she must begin mentoring the residents at the hospital. Left to his own devices, Danny stumbles upon Mindy's diary and gets himself into a tough situation.
55	9	"How to Lose a Mom in Ten Days"	David Rogers	Tracey Wigfield	November 25, 2014	2.33
Mindy is tired of Annette hovering around her relationship with Danny and decides to set her up on a date with Dr. Ledreau, an older practitioner from their building. Jeremy also has his eyes on this soon-to-be-retired doctor, as he is hoping for the practice to receive his patient list. Saddened by his breakup with Tamra, Morgan is convinced by Peter to set up an online dating profile.
56	10	"What About Peter?"	David Stassen	Ike Barinholtz & David Stassen	December 2, 2014	2.45
Appalled by Peter's living situation, Mindy convinces him to move next door to Danny's second apartment space. Danny, however, has other plans with the room. Jeremy's parenting skills are put to the test when he and Morgan are responsible for looking after Lauren's baby boy.
57	11	"Christmas"	Paul Lieberstein	Charlie Grandy	December 9, 2014	2.55
Mindy questions whether or not Danny will propose to her by Christmas time and is presented with the opportunity to apply to a medical fellowship at Stanford. Meanwhile, Danny's plan to set Peter up on a date with Dr. Jessica Lieberstein (Julia Stiles) go astray when she mistakenly takes Morgan out instead.
58	12	"Stanford"	Michael Spiller	Tracey Wigfield	January 6, 2015	2.24
Mindy has to overcome multiple bad impressions and a lack of confidence when she arrives at Stanford to start her fellowship, but things get crazy when Danny offers to help with a hostile doctor who was a friend of his in med school. Back in New York, a basketball game becomes a battleground between exes Tamra and Morgan.
59	13	"San Francisco Bae"	Michael Spiller	Chris Schleicher	January 13, 2015	2.42
On a night out in San Francisco, Mindy runs into the man whose virginity she took, Alex (Lee Pace). He is now very successful and she contemplates how things who have been if she were with him and not Danny. Back in New York, Morgan and Danny try to spy on Peter next door as they suspect Lauren cheating on Jeremy with Peter.
60	14	"No More Mr. Noishe Guy"	Michael Weaver	Jeremy Bronson	February 3, 2015	2.22
Mindy contemplates starting a fertility clinic in San Francisco with Rob, but talking to Danny becomes a problem especially when he buys a brownstone for the two of them in New York. Meanwhile Lauren's move to Texas encourages Peter to follow her, but it would mean him having to leave the practice.
61	15	"Dinner at the Castellanos"	David Rogers	Charlie Grandy	February 10, 2015	2.33
Mindy has big news to tell Danny, however this is delayed due to the arrival of Danny's father and half-sister, leading to an awkward dinner.
62	16	"Lahiri Family Values"	Marco Fargnoli	Tracey Wigfield	February 17, 2015	2.47
Danny promises to move to San Francisco with Mindy and tries to tell the practice, but they are confused and concerned about his motives. In California, Mindy reconnects with her little brother when she discovers he has damaged her credit, leaving her unable to get a business loan.
63	17	"Danny Castellano Is My Nutritionist"	Lynn Shelton	Mindy Kaling & Matt Warburton	February 24, 2015	2.28
Mindy and Danny pressure each other to be healthier in preparation for parenthood, the goal being for Mindy to eat less junk food and for Danny to quit smoking. The practice is busy and needs to hire an additional doctor, so they focus on impressing Dr. Phillips (Vanessa L. Williams), a glamorous former professor of Mindy's who is bored with retirement.
64	18	"Fertility Bites"	Nisha Ganatra	Jeremy Bronson & Chris Schleicher	March 3, 2015	2.13
Mindy's fertility clinic finally opens, but she struggles to attract patients due to her lack of experience in helping women conceive. Morgan, Tamra, and Beverly butt heads with Dr. Bergdahl (Dan Bakkedahl), leaving Jeremy caught in the middle of the feud.
65	19	"Confessions of a Catho-holic"	Ike Barinholtz	Jack Burditt	March 10, 2015	1.76
Mindy pretends to be Catholic in order to win the approval of the strict new priest at Danny's church (Stephen Colbert), who is also a reformed bad boy from Danny's old neighborhood. Morgan helps Jeremy prepare for his one-man show about his early life and emigration from England to America.
66	20	"What to Expect When You're Expanding"	Michael Weaver	Tracey Wigfield & Lang Fisher	March 17, 2015	2.00
Tamra's cousin Sheena (Laverne Cox), a stylist, tries to help Mindy regain her lost self-confidence as she gains pregnancy weight. Jeremy gets back into the dating game when he meets Whitney (Cristin Milioti) who shuts down a loud singles party.
67	21	"Best Man"	Michael Spiller	Mindy Kaling	March 24, 2015	2.05
Mindy questions Danny's commitment when he fails to meet her parents, who are about to move back to India for a year. Everyone prepares to attend Peter's wedding in Texas. Meanwhile, Morgan believes he has overheard shocking information about the paternity of Mindy's baby.

=== Season 4 (2015–16) ===
No. overall	No. in season	Title	Directed by	Written by	Original release date
68	1	"While I Was Sleeping"	Michael Spiller	Mindy Kaling	September 15, 2015
Mindy dreams of how her life would have been different had she not fallen in love with Danny. Meanwhile, Danny meets Mindy's parents in India.
69	2	"C Is for Coward"	Alex Hardcastle	Matt Warburton	September 22, 2015
Mindy wants a scheduled C-section, but Danny is in favor of a natural birth. However, when Mindy's water breaks on the way to an expo, Danny races to be there in time for their son's birth.
70	3	"Leo Castellano Is My Son"	Alex Reid	Charlie Grandy	September 29, 2015
As Danny heads back to work after the birth of their son, Mindy finds herself a bit stir crazy. Morgan finds romance with Mindy and Danny's neighbour, Chelsea. Tamra convinces Jeremy that his new girlfriend, Whitney, is cheating on him.
71	4	"The Bitch Is Back"	Michael Weaver	Tracey Wigfield	October 6, 2015
As Mindy prepares to go back to work after her maternity leave, she visits the office with Leo and meets her new coworkers. Mindy's instant dislike for the new doctor in the office makes her debate returning to work at all.
72	5	"Stay at Home MILF"	Rachel Goldenberg	Chris Schleicher	October 13, 2015
Mindy realizes being a stay-at-home mom is harder than she anticipated. After Danny patronizes her efforts, Mindy challenges Danny to be a stay-at-home dad. At the office, Morgan pretends to be Colette's boyfriend so her brother, Jody, does not find out that she is gay.
73	6	"Road Trip"	David Stassen	David Stassen	October 20, 2015
After his dad has a heart attack, Danny heads to California with Morgan in tow on a cross-country road trip. They make a pit stop in Oklahoma, where Danny is hiding a dark secret.
74	7	"Mindy and Nanny"	Roger Kumble	Lang Fisher	October 27, 2015
Mindy must fire Annette and hire a new nanny while Danny is away. Meanwhile, Jody helps Jeremy see Whitney is not all she seems.
75	8	"Later, Baby"	Ryan Case	Tracey Wigfield	November 3, 2015
When Mindy learns her fertility practice is struggling financially, Jody offers to help. Meanwhile, Peter's unexpected visit to NYC forces him to hash out his friendship issues with Jeremy.
76	9	"Jody Kimball-Kinney Is My Husband"	Marco Fargnoli	Chris Schleicher	November 10, 2015
While Danny is away, Mindy pretends Jody is her husband in order to get Leo into an elite preschool. In return, Mindy pretends to be Jody's girlfriend for a dinner with Jody's sister-in-law.
77	10	"The Departed"	Claire Scanlon	Lang Fisher	November 17, 2015
With Danny still away, Mindy accidentally joins a bereavement group while trying to sell her apartment. Elsewhere, Morgan and Colette attend Tamra's open mic performance against her will.
78	11	"The Lahiris and the Castellanos"	Kate Dennis	Charlie Grandy	November 24, 2015
Finally back from California, Danny and Mindy begin to plan their wedding. The Lahiri and Castellano families meet at their engagement party and cause drama. During the party Mindy tells an unhappy Danny about her new business venture.
79	12	"The Parent Trap"	David Rogers	Matt Warburton	December 1, 2015
Business is going well at The Lahiri Fertility Clinic with Mindy's first patient about to give birth. However, Mindy's relationship with Danny is strained when she finds out he is trying to intentionally impregnate her without her knowledge.
80	13	"When Mindy Met Danny"	Michael Spiller	Mindy Kaling & Matt Warburton	December 8, 2015
Mindy and Danny continue to argue with Christmas approaching, so Mindy reflects on meeting Danny on her first day of work at Shulman & Associates.
81	14	"Will They or Won't They"	Michael Spiller	Mindy Kaling & Matt Warburton	April 12, 2016
Mindy deals with the fallout after her breakup with Danny while trying to deal with her spring break Later, Baby clients.
82	15	"So You Think You Can Finance"	Ryan Case	Landon Young	April 19, 2016 (AU); April 26, 2016 (US)
Mindy realizes she needs help to get her finances in order so she enlists the help of Whitney, Jeremy's ex-girlfriend. Meanwhile, Jeremy begins dating a much older woman.
83	16	"Mindy Lahiri is DTF"	Alex Reid	Charlie Grandy	May 3, 2016
In search of a no-strings-attached hookup, Mindy dabbles with online dating. After a few embarrassing encounters, she steps up and asks for what she wants. Jody accidentally invites everyone over for a viewing party of the office's favorite TV show.
84	17	"2 Fast 2 Serious"	Ike Barinholtz	Ike Barinholtz & David Stassen	April 19, 2016
After her breakup with Danny, Mindy begins to date again but finds herself dating a man who gets serious too fast. Meanwhile, Colette finds it difficult to tell Jody that she is moving in with Morgan.
85	18	"Bernardo & Anita"	David Rogers	Mindy Kaling & Matt Warburton	May 10, 2016
Mindy tries to get in touch with her heritage when a date implies she is more white than Indian. Morgan and Jody vie for the attention of the same girl, a virgin, but realize they are not capable of being abstinent for her.
86	19	"Baby Got Backslide"	Geeta V. Patel	Chris Schleicher	May 17, 2016
Casey returns to New York and Mindy must fight the temptation to reignite a relationship with her former flame.
87	20	"The Greatest Date in the World"	Michael Weaver	Tracey Wigfield	May 24, 2016
Mindy starts dating Casey's friend Marcus (Ne-Yo), whose trendy hipsterism clashes with Mindy's love of the familiar.
88	21	"Under the Texan Sun"	David Stassen	Lang Fisher	May 31, 2016
Mindy visits Peter and his wife, Lauren, in Texas and ends up in the middle of their problems.
89	22	"Princeton Charming"	David Rogers	Guy Branum	June 7, 2016
Mindy, Morgan, and Jody head to Mindy's alma mater, Princeton University, for a presentation, but things get complicated when Jody's new girlfriend decides to come along.
90	23	"There's No Crying in Softball"	Michael Weaver	Jonathan Green & Gabe Miller	June 14, 2016
Mindy is roped into playing in a softball tournament with her coworkers while her new boyfriend visits for the weekend.
91	24	"My Kid Stays in the Picture"	Marco Fargnoli	Guy Branum	June 21, 2016
Mindy auditions Leo for a role on a soap opera. The nurses try to switch the doctors they work for at the practice. Jody's brother Forbes comes by.
92	25	"Freedom Tower Women's Health"	Linda Mendoza	Jonathan Green & Gabe Miller	June 28, 2016
Morgan and Jeremy visit Danny at his new office, and Mindy ends up getting a mysterious new patient. Meanwhile, a dirty secret threatens to derail her budding romance.
93	26	"Homewrecker"	Michael Spiller	Lang Fisher & Chris Schleicher	July 5, 2016
Mindy and Danny reconnect while trapped on an elevator at Leo's school. Meanwhile, Jody breaks into Mindy's apartment to apologize through a grand gesture.

=== Season 5 (2016–17) ===
No. overall	No. in season	Title	Directed by	Written by	Original release date
94	1	"Decision 2016"	Michael Spiller	Mindy Kaling	October 4, 2016
After Jody tries to win Mindy's heart by buying her an apartment, Mindy is torn between her old love, Danny, and a relationship with Jody. Tamra is suspicious about Mindy's trip to Miami so she and Colette go undercover to figure out what really happened.
95	2	"Nurses' Strike"	David Rogers	Matt Warburton	October 11, 2016
While Mindy struggles to take care of a sick Leo, Shulman and Associates is rocked by a nurses' strike led by Ben, a handsome male nurse. Meanwhile, Jody tries to sell the upstairs apartment and Brendan comes to Mindy seeking help.
96	3	"Margaret Thatcher"	Alex Reid	Charlie Grandy	October 18, 2016
The nurses' strike continues, while Mindy finds herself having romantic feelings for the enemy – Ben, the leader of the nurses. As the doctors and nurses try to stay strong, Jeremy finds that the stress is taking a serious toll on his health.
97	4	"Mindy Lahiri Is a Misogynist"	Ike Barinholtz	Lang Fisher	October 25, 2016
As Jeremy recovers from his heart attack, the practice needs another doctor. Jeremy and Jody want to hire a woman, but Mindy is not sure about sharing the spotlight. Meanwhile, she and Ben are getting serious.
98	5	"Leland Breakfast Is the Miracle Worker"	David Stassen	Chris Schleicher	November 1, 2016
When Mindy discovers that her new boyfriend is not being exclusive, she goes on a date with a famous actor aka "the bad boy of London theater." The nurses try to cheer up Jody, who's lost his mojo, and discover he might be planning something drastic.
99	6	"Concord"	Michael Spiller	Guy Branum	November 8, 2016
Mindy escapes to her childhood home in Massachusetts and discovers that her mom is using dubious methods to further her acting career in local theater. As Mindy and Rishi try to intervene, she learns that Danny is having doubts about marrying Sarah.
100	7	"Revenge of the Nurse"	Michael Spiller	Josh Bycel & Jonathan Fener	November 15, 2016
Mindy is afraid that she and Ben do not have similar desires for their futures; a former fling of Mindy's returns with an interesting new job.
101	8	"Hot Mess Time Machine"	David Rogers	Matt Warburton	February 14, 2017
Still reeling from her breakup with Ben, Mindy finds herself living the same day over and over again, and realizes that the only way to break the spell is to make things right with Ben.
102	9	"Bat Mitzvah"	Kate Dennis	Josh Bycel & Jonathan Fener	February 21, 2017
Mindy panics when her new boyfriend Ben does not invite her to his daughter's bat-mitzvah. Meanwhile, Jody, claiming he is over his heartache, dates Mindy's doppelgänger.
103	10	"Take My Ex-Wife, Please"	Daniella Eisman	Chris Schleicher	February 28, 2017
Mindy acts out after learning that Ben's attractive ex-wife is in town visiting him. Anna, having trouble at home, begrudgingly asks her coworkers for help.
104	11	"Dibs"	Michael Spiller	Lang Fisher	March 7, 2017
A heartbroken Anna grieves her breakup at Mindy's place, while Jody and Jeremy compete for her affection. Morgan, trying to jump-start his dating life, blows up at Colette's new girlfriend, Karen, when she accidentally interrupts his make out session.
105	12	"Mindy Lahiri Is a White Man"	Marco Fargnoli	Lang Fisher	March 14, 2017
Mindy is unfairly passed over for a promotion and goes to bed wishing things were different. She wakes up in the body of a handsome white man and quickly discovers the perks that supposedly come with white male privilege.
106	13	"Mindy's Best Friend"	Geeta V. Patel	Guy Branum	March 21, 2017
Mindy's world is turned upside down when her cool friend from childhood moves to New York and starts dating Morgan. Meanwhile, Ben has to cover his tracks after the nurses spot him in a provocative situation.
107	14	"A Decent Proposal"	Michael Spiller	Charlie Grandy	March 28, 2017
Mindy hears that Ben might be planning to propose, just as she decides she never wants to get married. Colette and Karen get engaged, but Colette immediately gets cold feet. Jeremy and Anna's friendship is tested when Anna's ex-husband comes back.

=== Season 6 (2017) ===
No. overall	No. in season	Title	Directed by	Written by	Original release date
108	1	"Is That All There Is?"	David Stassen	Mindy Kaling & Sonia Kharkar	September 12, 2017
As Mindy adjusts to married life with Ben, Jeremy tries to take things to the next level with Anna, while Tamra makes a life-changing decision.
109	2	"A Romantical Decouplement"	Lang Fisher	Lang Fisher	September 19, 2017
Anna and Jeremy break up, despite still having feelings for one another. Mindy and Ben decide to get divorced.
110	3	"May Divorce Be With You"	Linda Mendoza	Matt Warburton & Jennifer Vierck	September 26, 2017
Mindy turns to her ex Cliff (Glenn Howerton) for help navigating her messy divorce. But Peter (Adam Pally) is back in town to help pull Mindy out of her slump with an epic office karaoke party!
111	4	"Leo's Girlfriend"	Ike Barinholtz	Charlie Grandy & Meredith Dawson	October 3, 2017
Mindy goes toe to toe with a cliquey mom (Julie Bowen) at Leo's school. Meanwhile, Tamra fends off the advances of an ex she never thought she would backslide with.
112	5	"Jeremy & Anna's Meryl Streep Costume Party"	Geeta V. Patel	Mackenzie Dohr	October 10, 2017
Jeremy's hosting a party the office is actually excited for! Adding to the intrigue, Mindy invites a handsome stranger (Yassir Lester) who has an unexpected interest in Shulman and Associates. Jody competes with a beautiful doctor (Ana Ortiz) after she steals one of his patients.
113	6	"The Midwife's Tale"	Daniela Eisman	Chris Schleicher	October 17, 2017
Shulman and Associates is turned upside down when Mindy hires Brendan after he considered suicide. Meanwhile, rumors fly about who is the father of Tamra's baby.
114	7	"Girl Gone Wild"	David Rogers	Miranda Berman	October 24, 2017
Mindy reluctantly goes on the honeymoon she never went on by herself. During a hike, she gets trapped 127 Hours-style and gets visited by a hallucination of Reese Witherspoon (playing herself).
115	8	"Doctors Without Boundaries"	Marco Fargnoli	Guy Branum	October 31, 2017
Annette (Rhea Perlman) is furious when Mindy uncovers a secret about her and decides to get involved. Jody attempts to keep his new girlfriend (Ana Ortiz) from taking a job overseas, while Tamra dives headfirst into Morgan's religion.
116	9	"Danny in Real Life"	Michael Spiller	Matt Warburton & Mindy Kaling	November 7, 2017
Mindy and Danny can't agree on the best way to care for an ailing Annette. Meanwhile, Anna throws a disastrous bridal/baby shower for Tamra, where Colette has a heated confrontation with her brother, Jody. This is the last episode for Garret Dillahunt.
117	10	"It Had to Be You"	Michael Spiller	Matt Warburton & Mindy Kaling	November 14, 2017
In the series finale, Mindy's fertility practice is in danger and Annette's upcoming surgery looms. While Mindy and Danny wait, Mindy attends Morgan and Tamra's wedding, where she and the rest of the Shulman gang try to find their own happy endings.
