= Devin Sidell =

American actress, singer, writer, and producer

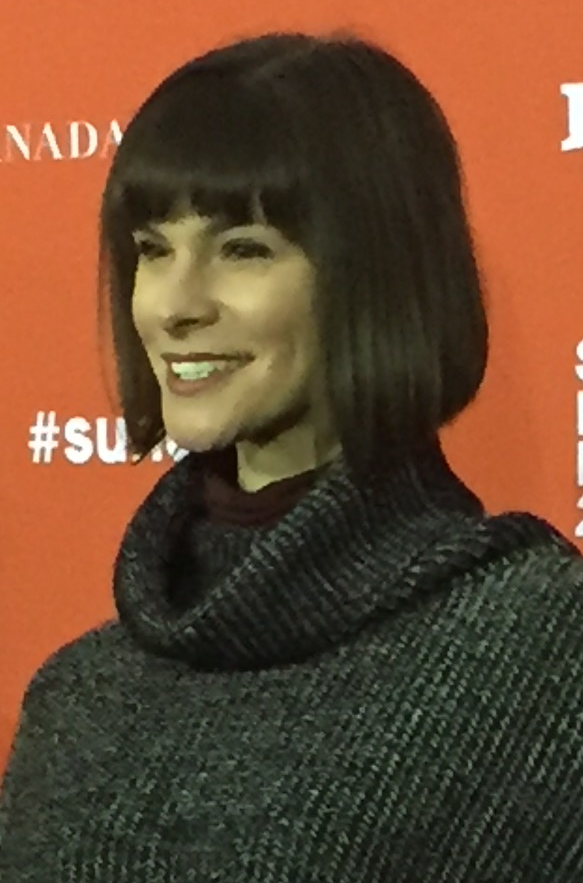
- Sidell in 2016
- Born: Los Angeles, California
- Education: Princeton University (BA)
- Occupations: Actress, writer, producer, singer
- Years active: 1987–present
- Notable work: Love, Danielle, Brooklyn Nine-Nine
- Website: www.devinsidell.com

Devin Sidell (born January 30) is an American actress, singer, writer, and producer.

== Career ==
Sidell appeared as Teen Lois on Malcolm in the Middle in 2003. She has guest starring roles on The O.C., Ray Donovan, NCIS, Lena Waithe's Twenties, and B.J. Novak's The Premise. She appeared in Rob Zombie's horror film 31 (Sundance Film Festival) and recurs as a sketch performer on Jimmy Kimmel Live!. Sidell has performed at the Kirk Douglas Theatre and The Broad Stage opposite Josh Gad and Bryce Dallas Howard.

Sidell is best known for her role in the episode "DFW" of Brooklyn Nine-Nine, where in the cold open, Jake helps a sister (Sidell) of a murder victim determine who killed her brother by having the police lineup sing "I Want It That Way" by the Backstreet Boys.

She co-wrote and starred in the feature film Love, Danielle, which centers on a woman who carries a BRCA gene mutation and must decide whether to undergo preventive surgeries to reduce her risk of developing cancer. The film draws on Sidell's personal experiences with the BRCA-1 gene mutation.

== Personal life ==
A Los Angeles native, Sidell graduated cum laude from Princeton University in 2002. She moved back to L.A. to pursue a career in film and television.

In 2016, Sidell underwent a preventive oophorectomy and hysterectomy while her sister was receiving treatment for breast cancer, Her family has a history of cancer, with her mother surviving both ovarian and breast cancer, and her aunt dying from ovarian cancer. In 2017, Sidell chose to have a preventive double mastectomy.

== Filmography ==
=== Television ===
Year	Title	Role	Notes
1987	Great Performances	Jean Graham	
1989	Thirtysomething	Young Rose	
1990	Family of Spies	Laura No. 2	
2003	Malcolm in the Middle	Teenage Lois	
2005	The O.C.	Abigail Stevens	
2005	Numb3rs	Student No. 1	
2011	Happy Endings	Ione	
2012	OK, Good	Coffee Shop Employee	
2012	Go On	Woman in Blue	
2014	Parks and Recreation	Brenda	
2014	About a Boy	Linda	
2014	Anger Management	Wife	
2014	The Funtastix	Eileen	
2015	The Middle	Waitress	
2015	Ray Donovan	Mandy	
2016	Grandfathered	Girl	
2016	Jane the Virgin	Charlie's Mom	
2016	L.A Picker	Sally Sandberg	
2016	NCIS	Angela Russell	
2016	Pitch	Darcie	
2016	Pure Genius	Veronique	
2018	Henry Danger	Megan	
2018	Brooklyn Nine-Nine	Gwen	
2018	Crazy Ex-Girlfriend	Tara	
2019	The Young and the Restless	Beth	
2019	20 Seconds to Live	–	
2020	Twenties	Tour Guide Tiffany	
2021	The Premise	Assistant Principal	
2021	Truth Be Told	Micah Devotee	
2023	Mayans M.C.	Claudia Jimenez	
2016–2024	Jimmy Kimmel Live!	Various	

=== Film ===
Year	Title	Role	Notes
2013	Call Me Crazy: A Five Film	Ivy	
2016	31	Georgina Victor	
2016	Hypothermia	Mary	Short
2016	Satellite of Love	Bonnie	
2020	Deadly Daughter Switch	Dr. Joyce	
2022	Low Life	Terry	
2024	Sensitive Men	Leafy Sea Dragon	Short
2025	Love, Danielle	Danielle Bledsoe	

=== Theatre ===
Year	Production	Role	Company / Venue	Notes
2023	The Thanksgiving Play	Logan	Ensemble Theatre Company	Directed by Brian McDonald
2018	The Value of Moscow	Emily	Sacred Fools Theater	Directed by Carrie Keranen
2015	The Behavior of Broadus	Rosalie Rayner	Center Theatre Group / Sacred Fools	Ovation & LADCC nominee
2014	The John B. Watson Project	Lead	Kirk Douglas Theatre / Center Theatre Group	World premiere
2009	Land of the Tigers	Sheba	Sacred Fools / Burglars of Hamm	L.A. Weekly Award winner
2008	Bermuda!	Grenadine	The Broad Stage	Opposite Josh Gad and Bryce Dallas Howard
2008	Love's Old Sweet Song	Velma Yearling	Syzygy Theatre Group	Directed by Martin Bedoian
2007	UG: The Caveman Musical	Tatata	Attic Theatre	Directed by Jerry Kernion
2005	Von Lutz	Anelle von Lutz	Lillian Theatre	Directed by Jon Lawrence Rivera
2003	Far Away	Prisoner	Odyssey Theatre	Directed by Ron Sossi

=== Other ===
Other
Year	Title	Role	Notes
2018	Video Palace	Tamra	Podcast Series
2020	The Last of Us Part II	Additional Voices	Video Game

== Awards ==
Sidell won an LA Weekly Award for her performance in Land of the Tigers at Sacred Fools Theatre and was nominated for both the Los Angeles Drama Critics Circle Award and Ovation Award for the musical The Behavior of Broadus, co-produced by Center Theatre Group.

Awards and nominations
Award	Year	Category	Work	Result
L.A. Weekly Award	2009	Female Comedy Performance	Land of the Tigers	Won
Ovation Award	2015	–	The Behavior of Broadus	Nominated
Los Angeles Drama Critics Circle Award	2015	–	The Behavior of Broadus	Nominated
Stage Raw Award	2015	–	The Behavior of Broadus	Nominated
WorldFest Houston International Film Festival	2025	Special Jury Prize, Best Actress	Love, Danielle	Nominated
Garden State Film Festival	2025	Best Actress in a Feature	Love, Danielle	Nominated
Phoenix Film Festival	2025	Best Screenplay	Love, Danielle	Won
