= Lawrence Clarke =

Lawrence Clarke may refer to:

- Lawrence Clarke (politician) (1832–1890), Chief Factor of the District of Saskatchewan for the Hudson's Bay Company
- Lawrence Clarke (hurdler) (born 1990), sprint hurdler

== See also ==
- Lawrence Gordon Clark, English television director and producer
- Laurence Clark (disambiguation)
- Larry Clarke (1925–2015), Canadian businessman
