= Fat Randy =

Fat Randy may refer to:

- Randy Bullock (born 1989), American football placekicker
- Randy Bumpagussy, a character in 31
- Fat Randy, a song by Voodoo Glow Skulls in the album Firme
