= Raymond Cruz =

American actor (born 1964)

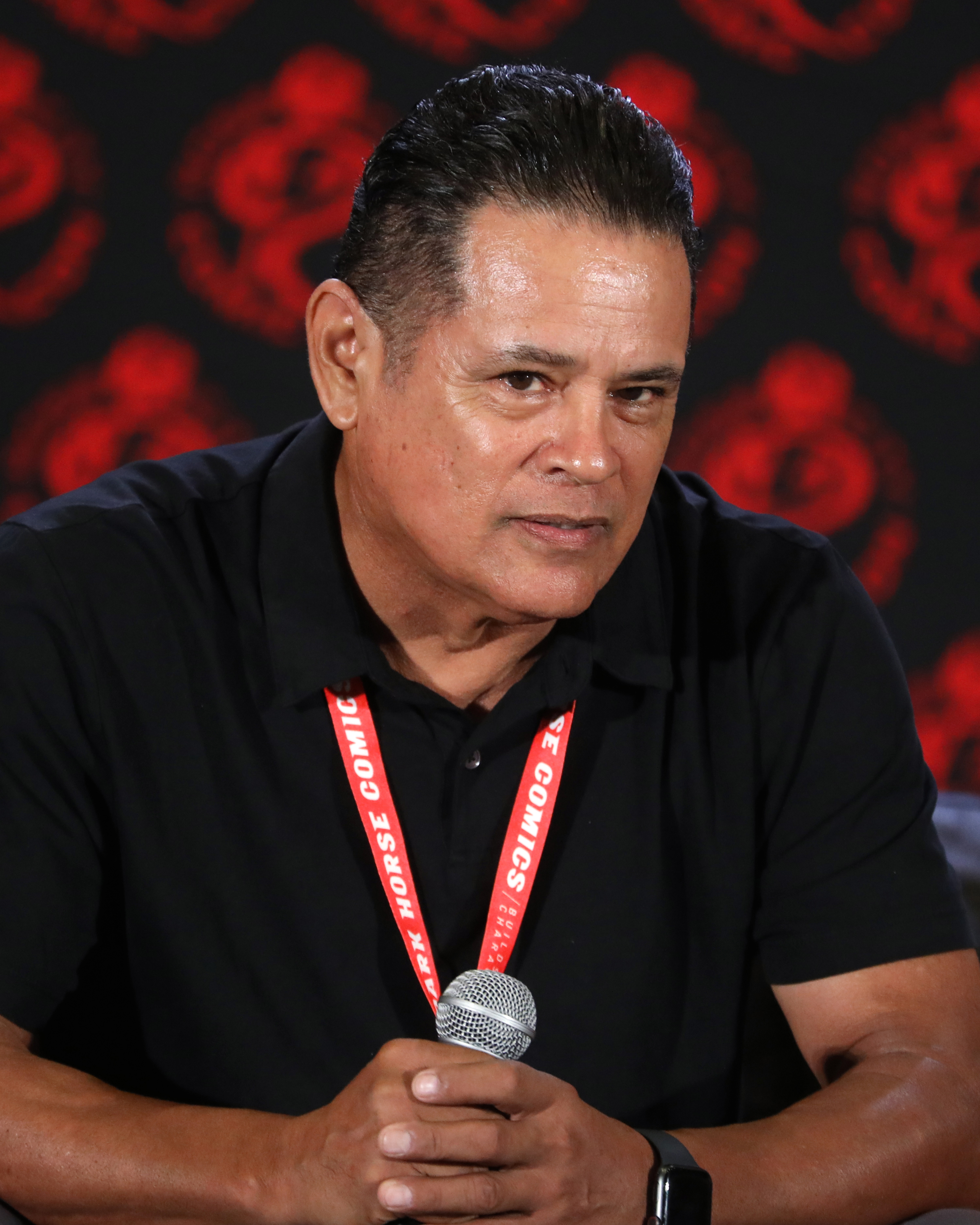
- Cruz in 2024
- Born: September 10, 1964 (age 62); East Los Angeles, California, U.S.
- Occupation: Actor
- Years active: 1987–present
- Spouse: Simi Mehta

Raymond Cruz (born September 10, 1964) is an American actor, best known for his starring role as Detective Julio Sanchez in the series The Closer and its spin-off Major Crimes, his recurring role as drug lord Tuco Salamanca in the crime drama Breaking Bad and its prequel series Better Call Saul, and his role as exorcist Rafael Olvera in The Curse of La Llorona and The Revenge of La Llorona.

== Early life ==
Cruz was born and raised in East Los Angeles, California, and is of Mexican descent. He grew up in a neighborhood that regularly saw gang activity, and had relatives in such gangs as Maravilla and Barrio South Gate. He witnessed a shooting at age 12, noting the victim's "brains came out the back of his head". For his portrayal of Tuco Salamanca, he was able to relate to his experiences witnessing people who were high on methamphetamine.

Cruz has said that becoming interested in American literature early in life helped him avoid joining such gangs himself. His favorite novel is Harper Lee's To Kill a Mockingbird. Cruz attended three high schools after being expelled for writing editorials that satirized and questioned school policies. He attended East Los Angeles College, where he got "sidetracked" into theater.

== Career ==
Cruz's film roles include sniper Ding Chavez in Clear and Present Danger, Hector in Out for Justice, Tom Berenger's second-in-command Joey Six in The Substitute, U.S. Marine Sergeant Rojas in The Rock, as Jesus in From Dusk Till Dawn 2: Texas Blood Money, USMC Private Vincent DiStephano in Alien Resurrection, and Ramirez in Under Siege. He appeared as Chuey, a gang member from the Vatos Locos, in the gang film Blood In Blood Out.

In 2005, he played Chino in Havoc. He appeared in Gremlins 2: The New Batch, credited as "The Messenger," and in Training Day as a gang member named Sniper. He played a Los Angeles firefighter in Collateral Damage. He had guest roles in the Star Trek: Deep Space Nine episode "The Siege of AR-558", The X-Files episode "El Mundo Gira", and the second season of 24. He also made an appearance as the father of a murdered girl in CSI. He played Det. Julio Sanchez for the entire seven season run of The Closer and continued in that role for all six seasons of the spin-off Major Crimes.

Cruz performed the well-known role of Tuco Salamanca, a sadistic and maniacal meth dealer in Breaking Bad in 2008 and 2009, a role he reprised in 2015 and 2016 during the first two seasons of the Breaking Bad prequel spin-off, Better Call Saul. He had a recurring role as Paco on My Name Is Earl, and as Alejandro Perez on Nip/Tuck.

== Personal life ==
Cruz is married to fellow actress Simi Mehta with whom he co-starred on The X-Files in the episode "El Mundo Gira".

On September 8, 2025, Cruz was arrested after allegedly spraying a woman with his water hose outside his house. He was released on his own recognizance and had a court date scheduled for October 1, but the charges were dropped.

== Filmography ==
=== Film ===
Year	Title	Role	Notes
1987	Maid to Order	Sam	
1988	Twice Dead	Gang Member	
1989	I Know My First Name Is Steven	Punk	
1990	Gremlins 2: The New Batch	The Messenger	
1990	Cold Dog Soup	Gang Member	
1991	Prison Stories: Women on the Inside	Montoya	Television film
1991	Dead Again	Store Clerk	
1991	Out for Justice	Hector	
1991	Fallen Angels	Diego	Television film
1992	Man Trouble	Balco	
1992	Nails	Paco Sanchez	Television film
1992	Judgement	Cyclone	
1992	Under Siege	Ramirez	
1993	Blood In Blood Out	Chuey	
1993	When the Party's Over	Mario	
1994	Dead Badge	Tomas Gomez	
1994	Clear and Present Danger	Ding Chavez	
1994	Dragstrip Girl	Doogie	Television film
1995	Operation Dumbo Drop	Staff Sergeant Adams	Uncredited
1996	The Substitute	Joey "Six"	
1996	The Rock	Sergeant Rojas	Uncredited
1996	Up Close & Personal	Fernando Buttanda	
1996	Broken Arrow	USAF Lieutenant Colonel	Uncredited
1997	Last Stand at Saber River	Manuel	Television film
1997	Alien Resurrection	Private Vincent DiStephano	
1998	Playing Patti		
1999	From Dusk Till Dawn 2: Texas Blood Money	Jesus	
1999	The Last Marshal	T-Boy	
2000	Blood Money	Gutierrez	Television film
2001	Training Day	Sniper	
2002	Collateral Damage	Junior	
2004	Just Hustle	Spanish Professor	
2004	My Name Is Modesty	Raphael Garcia	
2005	Havoc	Chino	
2005	Brothers in Arms	Reverend	
2006	10 Tricks	Sal	
2015	Cleveland Abduction	Ariel Castro	Television film
2019	The Curse of La Llorona	Rafael Olvera	
2020	Wander	Luis Santiago	
2021	Blue Miracle	Hector	
2022	Six Feet	Gus	
2023	Medellin	El Diablo	
2025	Love, Danielle	Stan DeManuel	
2025	Aztec Batman: Clash of Empires	Yoka / Joker (voice)	Direct-to-Video
2027	The Revenge of La Llorona †	Rafael Olvera	Post-production

=== Television ===
Year	Title	Role	Notes
1988	Beauty and the Beast	Hal	Episode: "Down to a Sunless Sea"
1988	Cagney & Lacey	Alonzo	Episode: "Land of the Free"
1988	CBS Schoolbreak Special	Angel Perez	Episode: "Gangs"
1988	Vietnam War Story	Diaz	Episode: "Separated"
1988	Knots Landing	Van Driver, Young Man	2 episodes
1989	A Nightmare on Drug Street	Felipe	Short Film
1990	Hunter	Tomas Delgado	Episode: "La Familia"
1990	Freddy's Nightmares	Johnny "Mac" McFarland	Episode: "Life Sentence"
1990	Matlock	Alien Worker	Episode: "The Cookie Monster"
1990	Lifestories		Episode: "Frank Brody"
1990	China Beach	Lopez	Episode: "One Small Step"
1993	Murder, She Wrote	José "Joseph" Galvan	Episode: "Double Jeopardy"
1995	The Marshal	Rossiter	Episode: "The Ballad of Lucas Burke"
1995	Walker, Texas Ranger	Sergeant Perez	Episode: "Case Closed"
1995–2000	NYPD Blue	Raoul / Rico	2 episodes
1995–2000	The Eddie Files	Johnny	16 episodes
1997	The X-Files	Eladio Buente	Episode: "El Mundo Gira"
1997	Cracker	MacCormick	Episode: "'Tis Pity She's a Whore"
1997	413 Hope St.	Rico	Episode: "Lost Boys and Gothic Girls"
1998	Star Trek: Deep Space Nine	Vargas	Episode: "The Siege of AR-558"
1998	The Practice	Miguel Moreno	Episode: "Truth and Consequences"
1999	Seven Days	Rodriguez	Episode: "Daddy's Girl"
2000	Strange World	Rinaldo Molina	Episode: "Man Plus"
2000	Seven Days	Teo Millar	Episode: "The Cuban Missile"
2000	Harsh Realm	Sergeant Escalante	2 episodes
2002	Robbery Homicide Division	Jesus "Termite" Rosales	Episode: "City of Strivers"
2002	Boomtown	Ruben	Episode: "Crash"
2002–2003	The Division	Roland / Ray Sanchez	3 episodes
2003–2011	CSI: Miami	Martin Medesto / Marcos Trejo	2 episodes
2003	24	Rouse	2 episodes
2003–2008	CSI: Crime Scene Investigation	Miguel Durado / Donald Balboa	2 episodes
2003–2006	Nip/Tuck	Alejandro Perez	2 episodes
2005–2012	The Closer	Detective Julio Sanchez	105 episodes
2007–2008	My Name Is Earl	Paco	5 episodes
2007	Day Break	Luis Torres	2 episodes
2008	Ylse	Jesse	
2008–2009	Breaking Bad	Tuco Salamanca	4 episodes
2011	Los Americans	Memo	7 episodes
2012	White Collar	Enrico Morales	Episode: "Most Wanted"
2012–2018	Major Crimes	Julio Sanchez	105 episodes
2013	Lauren	Martinez	3 episodes; Web series
2015–2016	Better Call Saul	Tuco Salamanca	3 episodes
2016	The Eric Andre Show	Himself	Episode: "Raymond Cruz; Amber Rose"
2018	Get Shorty	Swayze	2 episodes
2019	Madam Secretary	President Mateo Sandino Sr.	Episode: "Something Better"
2023	Mayans M.C.	Smokey	
2024	Grey's Anatomy	Daniel Jiménez (inmate)	Episode: "The Marathon Continues"
