= Kelly Jenrette =

American actress

- Occupation: Actress
- Years active: 2006–present

Kelly Jenrette is an American actress. She is known for her roles on Grandfathered and Manhunt: Deadly Games. She received a nomination for a Primetime Emmy Award for Outstanding Guest Actress in a Drama Series for her guest appearance on The Handmaid's Tale.

She was also set to act as Sarah Jakes Roberts in a Kerry Washington show that was ultimately not greenlit.

== Filmography ==
=== Film ===
Year	Title	Role	Notes
2014	Audrey	Lucy	
2018	Jinn	Rasheedah	
2020	Uncorked	Brenda	
2020	All Day and a Night	Delanda	
2025	Love, Danielle	Char	

=== Television ===
Year	Title	Role	Notes
2006–07	Frisky Dingo	Sinn / Hooper (voice)	14 episodes
2013	Happy Endings	Shop Lady	Episode: "Bros Before Bros"
2013	The Haunted Hathaways	Reporter	2 episodes
2015	Weird Loners	Becky	Episode: "We're Here. We're Weird. Get Used to Us."
2015–16	Grandfathered	Annelise Wilkinson	22 episodes
2016	Pitch	Rhonda	3 episodes
2016	Fuller House	Mrs. Banks	Episode: "A Tangled Web"
2017	Graves	Jo Crawford	2 episodes
2018	Here and Now	Jamila Williams	2 episodes
2018	The Handmaid's Tale	Annie	Episode: "Other Women"
2019	Limetown	Winona	4 episodes
2020	Manhunt: Deadly Games	Stacy Knox	10 episodes
2020–21	Mixed-ish	Vivica	2 episodes
2021	All American	Amara Patterson	Episode: "All American: Homecoming"
2022–24	All American: Homecoming	Amara Patterson	Main role
2024	Found	Viola Lashay	Episode: "Missing While Difficult"
