= Edward Denman Clarke =

- Born: 21 May 1898; Grand Duchy of Finland
- Died: 5 September 1966 (aged 68); Isle of Wight
- Military career
- Allegiance: United Kingdom
- Branch: British Army; Royal Air Force
- Service years: 1916–1919
- Rank: Captain
- Unit: No. 45 Squadron RAF
- Awards: Commander of the Order of the British Empire; Military Cross
- Other work: Managing Director of Saunders-Roe Ltd.

Captain Edward Denman Clarke CBE, MC (21 May 1898 – 5 September 1966) was a World War I flying ace. Although he was credited with six aerial victories, he was granted a Military Cross for his valour in a ground attack mission.

In later life, Clarke was made a Commander of the Order of the British Empire as the managing director of the aviation and shipping corporation Saunders-Roe.

== Early life ==
Edward Denman Clarke was born on 21 May 1898 in the Grand Duchy of Finland, where his St Petersburg-based family had a hunting lodge. He was educated at Eton College.

== World War I ==
Clarke joined the Royal Flying Corps in early 1916, being confirmed in the rank of second lieutenant on 19 May. On 21 August, he was appointed a flying officer and was posted to No. 45 Squadron RFC.

He was promoted to lieutenant on 1 August 1917, and scored six aerial victories between 23 August and 20 October.

He was shot down by ground fire on 26 October 1917, as he strafed enemy positions from his Sopwith Camel during the Battle of Passchendaele. His courage on that occasion earned him a Military Cross. The accompanying award citation, gazetted 23 April 1918, told the tale:

"For conspicuous gallantry and devotion to duty. He has shot down five enemy machines. In an attack he repeatedly dived to within fifty feet of the enemy infantry, firing between 500 and 600 rounds. Though struck by a piece of shell, which wounded him in both arms and shattered both petrol tanks, he succeeded in gliding back behind our lines."

On 1 August 1918 he was appointed temporary captain. On 31 January 1919, Clarke relinquished his commission in the Royal Air Force.

== Aerial victories ==
List of aerial victories
No.	Date/time	Aircraft	Foe	Result	Location	Notes
1	23 August 1917 @ 0915 hours	Sopwith 1 1/2 Strutter serial number A1048	Albatros D.V	Driven down out of control	Bellewarde Lake	Observer/gunner: G. A. Brooke
2	3 September 1917 @ 1310 hours	Sopwith Camel s/n B2327	Albatros D.III	Set afire in midair; destroyed	Zandvoorde, Belgium	
3	14 September 1917 @ 1424 hours	Sopwith Camel s/n B2327	Albatros D.V	Driven down out of control	East of Merckem	
4	20 September 1917 @ 1120 hours	Sopwith Camel s/n B2327	Albatros D.V	Destroyed	Passchendaele, Belgium	
5	26 September 1917 @ 1650 hours	Sopwith Camel s/n B2327	German two-seater	Destroyed	East of Zillebeke, Belgium	
6	20 October 1917 @ 1240 hours	Sopwith Camel	Albatros D.V	Driven down out of control	Kastelhoek	

== Post war ==
He married first Audrey Rant with whom he had two sons, Larry and Peter, and a daughter Valerie . He later married Maureen Cowie Leitch.

On 31 May 1956, Clarke was honoured with the award of Commander of the Order of the British Empire; at the time, he was the managing director of Saunders-Roe Ltd., Cowes, Isle of Wight.

Clarke died on 5 September 1966.
