= El Mundo Gira =

- The X-Files episode
- Episode no.: Season 4 Episode 11
- Directed by: Tucker Gates
- Written by: John Shiban
- Production code: 4X11
- Original air date: January 12, 1997
- Running time: 44 minutes

Guest appearances
- Mitch Pileggi as Assistant Director Walter Skinner; Rubén Blades as Conrad Lozano; Raymond Cruz as Eladio Buente; Jose Yenque as Soledad Buente; Simi Mehta as Gabrielle Buente; Lillian Hurst as Flakita; Susan Bain as County Coroner; Robert Thurston as Dr. Larry Steen; Michael Kopsa as Rick Culver; Markus Hondro as The Barber; Janeth Munoz as Village Woman; Pamela Díaz as Maria Dorantes; Fabricio Santin as Migrant Worker; Jose Vargas as INS Worker; Tito Mata as INS Guard; Tony Dean Smith as Store Clerk

Episode chronology
← Previous "Paper Hearts"	Next → "Leonard Betts"
- The X-Files season 4

"El Mundo Gira" is the eleventh episode of the fourth season of the American science fiction television series The X-Files. It premiered on the Fox network in the United States on January 12, 1997. It was written by John Shiban and directed by Tucker Gates. The episode is a "Monster-of-the-Week" story, unconnected to the series' wider mythology. "El Mundo Gira" received a Nielsen rating of 13.3 and was viewed by 22.37 million people in its initial broadcast, and received mixed to negative reviews from television critics.

The show centers on FBI special agents Fox Mulder (David Duchovny) and Dana Scully (Gillian Anderson), who work on cases linked to the paranormal, called X-Files. Mulder is a believer in the paranormal, and the skeptical Scully has been assigned to debunk his work. In this episode, strange and deadly rain in a migrant workers camp sends Mulder and Scully on the trail of a mythical beast—El Chupacabra. What they discover is a bizarre fungal growth affecting undocumented immigrants.

Shiban was inspired to write "El Mundo Gira" after noticing the long lines of migrant workers he would often see at his job when working as a computer programmer in the Los Angeles area. He combined it with an idea he had about a contagious fungus. Series creator Chris Carter was attracted to the soap opera-like aspects of the episode, and the title of the episode means "The World Turns" in Spanish. The migrant camp used in the episode was built from scratch in a waste ground near Boundary Bay Airport in Vancouver. This site was later used again in the episode "Tempus Fugit".

== Plot ==
Agents Fox Mulder (David Duchovny) and Dana Scully (Gillian Anderson) investigate the death of Maria Dorantes, an undocumented immigrant from Mexico living in the San Joaquin Valley near Fresno, California who was found dead, with her face partially eaten away, after yellow rain fell from the sky. Maria was the object of the love of two brothers, Eladio (Raymond Cruz) and Soledad Buente; Soledad blames his brother for her death. The migrants believe that the so-called "Chupacabra" was responsible for her death, despite the fact that none of the circumstances of the death resemble anything close to reports of the Chupacabra. Mulder, assisted on the case by Mexican-American INS agent Conrad Lozano, is able to track down and interrogate Eladio, who frightens the other migrants. Meanwhile, Scully discovers that Maria was killed by a fungal growth known as Aspergillus.

Eladio escapes as he is being deported, killing a truck driver in the process. A clinical exam on the driver shows his death was caused by a rapid growth of Trichophyton — the athlete's foot fungus. Scully brings samples of the fatal fungi to a mycologist who discovers that their abnormally rapid growth was caused by an unidentifiable enzyme. This revelation leads Scully to suspect Eladio of being an unwitting carrier of the enzyme, necessitating his immediate capture. Eladio, seeking to return to Mexico, meets with his cousin Gabrielle to ask for money. He works with a construction foreman for the day to make the money. Soledad comes after him, seeking to kill him, but finds the foreman dead. Eladio escapes in the foreman's truck and heads to the grocery store where Gabrielle works, spreading the fungal growth. The agents later confront Soledad at the supermarket, discovering another dead victim of the fungus.

Eladio returns to see Gabrielle, but by now has grown deformed from the fungus. Gabrielle, afraid of him, gives him her money and lies to the agents about his location when they come to see her. In actuality, Eladio has returned to the camp where Maria died, where Lozano tries to spur Soledad on in killing his brother. Soledad finds he can't do it, and Lozano struggles with him, being accidentally killed when the gun goes off. Soledad becomes a carrier of the fungal growth himself and flees with Eladio towards Mexico.

== Production ==
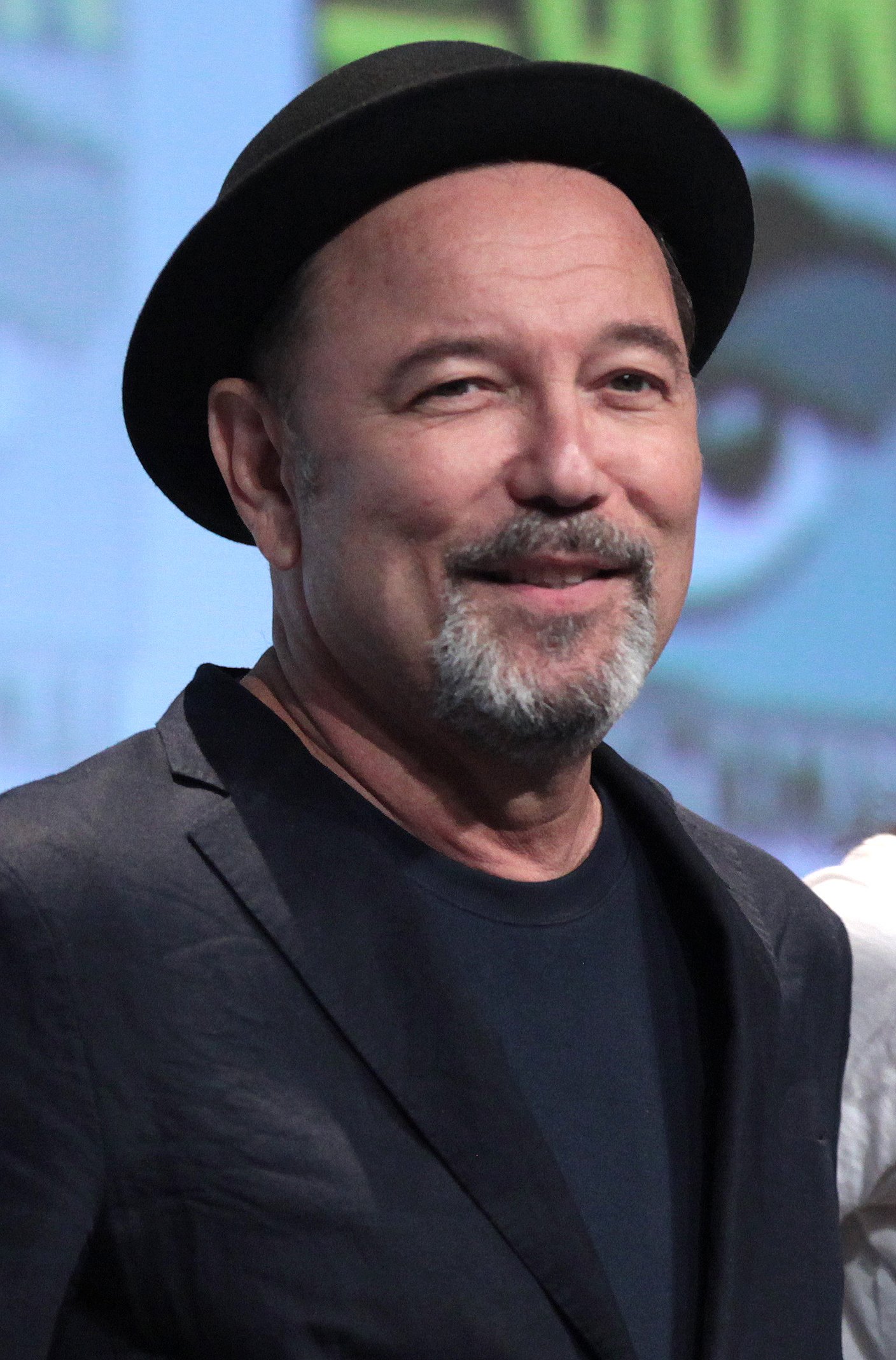
"El Mundo Gira" guest stars Rubén Blades, whom Chris Carter had long been wanting to feature in an episode.

"El Mundo Gira" was inspired by writer John Shiban's memory of the "long lines of migrant workers in the strawberry fields alongside the freeway" in Greater Los Angeles area. When Shiban started to work on his script, he combined these memories with an idea about a highly dangerous fungal infection, along with elements of the "Chupacabra" Latin American folk myth (which he had originally heard about in an article in the Los Angeles Times sometime prior). Initial versions of the story featured a child and later a truck driver as the carriers of the contagion before Shiban settled on the character of Eladio. As Shiban's story was coming together, series creator Chris Carter noted its telenovela/soap opera-like nature, and so it was decided to title the episode "El Mundo Gira", which means "The World Turns" in Spanish and is a direct reference to the popular American television soap opera As the World Turns. Lozano was portrayed by Panamanian singer, actor, and ad hoc politician Rubén Blades, whom Chris Carter had long been wanting to feature in an episode. Coincidentally, Raymond Cruz and Simi Mehta—the actors who portrayed Eladio and Gabrielle—were in a romantic relationship at the time of filming and later were married.

When developing the script for "El Mundo Gira", Shiban spent "several days" at an Immigration and Naturalization Service (INS) immigration processing center in San Pedro, California, where he observed how the immigrants acted and were treated. Shiban noticed that many of the immigrants refused to give the INS agents their real names, which was reflected in the eventual episode. The show's set designers scouted out a barren stretch of land near Boundary Bay Airport, Vancouver and erected a faux-migrant camp for use in the episode. (After the set was torn down, the area was later used during the filming of the episode "Tempus Fugit".) Filming was temporarily set back when it snowed at the camp site the day before production was set to commence, requiring the show's crew to use, among other things, hot water and hair dryers to clear the area.

== Reception ==
"El Mundo Gira" was originally broadcast in the United States on the Fox network on January 12, 1997. This episode earned a Nielsen rating of 13.3, with a 19 share, meaning that roughly 13.3 percent of all television-equipped households, and 19 percent of households watching television, were tuned in to the episode. It was viewed by 22.37 million viewers.

Zack Handlen of The A.V. Club reviewed the episode positively, rating it a B. He considered the episode "entertaining to watch" with "nifty direction from Tucker Gates", despite being formulaic and with the same problems he found in the previous episode penned by John Shiban, season three's "Teso Dos Bichos". Handlen had much praise for the second half, which he noted was filled with dark humor, and featured a "bizarre ending". Author Keith Topping criticized the episode in his book X-Treme Possibilities, calling it an "awful episode with a heavy-handed, clod-hopping attempt at social comment that hardly sits well with the themes on display in the rest of the episode." He called it the worst episode of the fourth season. Robert Shearman, in his book Wanting to Believe: A Critical Guide to The X-Files, Millennium & The Lone Gunmen, rated the episode one star out of five and wrote that it was "trying very hard to be clever", but "if cleverness were only about intent, then we could all be geniuses". Shearman derided the episode's use of social criticism, referring to it as "rubbish [because it] only works if it isn't underlined each time it's made." Furthermore, the author criticized the story's "Mexican soap opera" style, noting that it drowned out the themes in "unengaging melodrama". Paula Vitaris from Cinefantastique gave the episode a largely negative review and awarded it one star out of four. She wrote that "'El Mundo Gira' is so overloaded with ideas that it falls over and can't get up".

== Bibliography ==
- Cornell, Paul; Day, Martin; Topping, Keith (1998). X-Treme Possibilities. Virgin Publications, Ltd. ISBN 0-7535-0228-3.
- Meisler, Andy (1998). I Want to Believe: The Official Guide to the X-Files Volume 3. Harper Prism. ISBN 0061053864.
- Shearman, Robert (2009). Wanting to Believe: A Critical Guide to The X-Files, Millennium & The Lone Gunmen. Mad Norwegian Press. ISBN 978-0975944691.
