= Grandfathered (TV series) =

American comedy television series

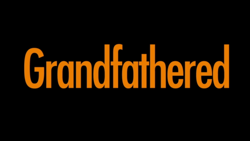
- Genre: Sitcom
- Created by: Daniel Chun
- Starring: John Stamos; Paget Brewster; Josh Peck; Christina Milian; Ravi Patel; Kelly Jenrette
- Composer: Siddhartha Khosla
- Country of origin: United States
- Original language: English
- No. of seasons: 1
- No. of episodes: 22

Production
- Executive producers: Chris Koch; John Stamos; Dan Fogelman; Daniel Chun
- Cinematography: Chris Seager
- Camera setup: Single-camera
- Running time: 20–22 minutes
- Production companies: Rhode Island Ave. Productions; Consolidated Chunworks; 20th Century Fox Television; ABC Studios

Original release
- Network: Fox
- Release: September 29, 2015 – May 10, 2016

Grandfathered is an American sitcom created by Daniel Chun for Fox. Originally titled Grandpa, the show was picked up to series on May 8, 2015, and premiered on September 29, 2015. On October 15, 2015, Fox ordered an additional six scripts for the first season. On October 28, 2015, Fox ordered a full season of 22 episodes for the first season.

On May 12, 2016, Fox canceled the series after one season.

== Synopsis ==
Grandfathered details the life of a bachelor and restaurant owner who discovers that he has a son as well as a granddaughter from a relationship that occurred over 25 years prior to the events of the series.

== Cast ==
=== Main ===
- John Stamos as James "Jimmy" Martino, a 50-year-old, lifelong bachelor and successful restaurant owner who discovers that he has both a son and a granddaughter. He's considered to be self-absorbed, career-obsessed, and inexperienced at parenthood. As the series progresses, his egotistical personality slowly begins to fade away, as he realizes that the son he never knew had needed a father, and Jimmy now wants to make it up to him.
- Paget Brewster as Sara Kingsley, Gerald's mother, Edie's grandmother, and Jimmy's ex-girlfriend. She broke up with Jimmy due to his self-absorbed and career-obsessed personality. After their breakup, she found out that she was pregnant with Gerald and kept it hidden from Jimmy for over 25 years.
- Josh Peck as Gerald E. Kingsley, Jimmy and Sara's 25-year-old son who also has a baby daughter
- Christina Milian as Vanessa, Gerald's best friend and his child's mother with whom he is in love. She is usually unaware of Gerald's attempts to woo her.
- Ravi Patel as Ravi Gupta, the head chef at Jimmy's restaurant
- Kelly Jenrette as Annelise Wilkinson, Jimmy's assistant and right-hand woman who is openly a lesbian

=== Recurring ===
- Layla and Emelia Golfieri as Edie, Gerald and Vanessa's baby daughter and Jimmy and Sara's granddaughter
- Abby Walker as Cindy, a ditzy and openly bisexual server working at Jimmy's restaurant
- A.J. Rivera as Victor, a chef working beneath Ravi at Jimmy's restaurant
- Andy Daly as Bruce, Sara's on-and-off boyfriend. He was the only father figure Gerald had growing up.
- Regina Hall as Catherine Sanders, a CEO whom Jimmy dates and with whom he has a rare "adult" relationship
- Michael Trucco as Craig, an old flame of Sara's whom she attempts to reconnect with after Bruce leaves for China

== Reception ==
Grandfathered has received generally positive reviews from critics. On Rotten Tomatoes the series has a rating of 68%, based on 44 reviews, with an average rating of 6/10. The site's critical consensus reads, "John Stamos is as handsome and charming as ever, but Grandfathered's jokes are tired and schmaltzy." On Metacritic, the series has a score of 62 out of 100, based on 22 critics, indicating "generally favorable reviews".

== Episodes ==
No.	Title	Directed by	Written by	Original release date	Prod. code	US viewers (millions)
1	"Pilot"	Chris Koch	Daniel Chun	September 29, 2015	1AYY01	5.34
Jimmy Martino, a 50-year-old single restaurant owner, learns he has both a son, Gerald, and a granddaughter, Edie, due to a fling he had over 25 years ago with a woman named Sara. Jimmy tries to help Gerald romance baby-mom Vanessa, who still treats him as a friend. Conflict ensues when celebrities arrive at the restaurant on the same night Jimmy is babysitting Edie.
2	"Dad Face"	Chris Koch	Danny Chun	October 6, 2015	1AYY02	3.87
Jimmy is forced to miss the party of the year to take part in Gerald's "family fun day" at the beach. Sara learns something new about Vanessa.
3	"Guys' Night"	Chris Koch	Isaac Aptaker & Elizabeth Berger	October 13, 2015	1AYY04	3.17
Jimmy takes Gerald for a night out in order to bond with him, which goes awry when Gerald gets drunk and is anxious to profess his love for Vanessa. Meanwhile, Annelise makes plans to hire a new mixologist to work with the restaurant's longtime bartender Willie (Jack McGee), who is not thrilled about the idea.
4	"Deadbeat"	Christine Gernon	Jeremy Bronson	October 20, 2015	1AYY03	3.33
Jimmy hosts a belated second birthday party for Edie at his restaurant, inviting the family. Sara's brother Fredrick (Patrick Fischler) arrives to confront Jimmy about leaving Sara to raise Gerald by herself, openly calling him a deadbeat. Jimmy then learns that Sara lied to her family years ago, saying Jimmy knew about the pregnancy and ran off.
5	"Edie's Two Dads"	Rebecca Asher	Dave Jeser & Matt Silverstein	November 3, 2015	1AYY05	3.18
A traffic incident prevents Gerald and Vanessa from taking Edie to an interview at an exclusive preschool, so Jimmy has to go instead. Jimmy meets Sloan (JoAnna Garcia Swisher), the preschool administrator, and vainly tells her that he is Edie's father. When Gerald shows up later, also telling Sloan that he is Edie's father, the two pretend to be a gay couple who adopted Edie, thinking it might give her a leg up in gaining admission.
6	"My Amal"	Chris Koch	Laura Krafft	November 10, 2015	1AYY06	3.05
Jimmy dates one of Sara's coworkers who is closer to Gerald's age. Jimmy thinks the date goes well but he gets the brush-off when he asks the woman about a second date, so he consults Sara for advice. Meanwhile, Gerald and Vanessa explore being "friends with benefits" before both giving up on it for different reasons.
7	"Sexy Guardian Angel"	Chris Koch	Greg Lisbe & Jared Miller	November 17, 2015	1AYY09	2.98
With Gerald trying to move on from Vanessa, Jimmy takes him to a bar to hook up with someone. Gerald meets Frankie (Lyndsy Fonseca) and takes her home. The next day, Gerald is already treating Frankie like a girlfriend, which concerns Jimmy, especially after Frankie's co-worker Priya (Noureen DeWulf) confides to Jimmy that Frankie is also sleeping with her boss. Meanwhile, Vanessa pitches some products to the restaurant that Jimmy hates. But he likes Vanessa's drive so he has Annelise mentor her, which leads to the two women fighting.
8	"Gerald's Two Dads"	Christine Gernon	Sam Laybourne	November 24, 2015	1AYY07	2.72
Jimmy plans a quick "stop and run" at Sara's and Gerald's Thanksgiving get-together, before heading to Malibu for a long weekend with hot model Kaylee (Andrea Hunt). But his plans quickly change when he meets Bruce (Andrew Daly), Sara's former on/off boyfriend whom Gerald says was his only father figure growing up.
9	"Jimmy & Son"	Trent O'Donnell	Laura Chinn	December 1, 2015	1AYY08	3.11
Jimmy gives Gerald the job as the greeter at his restaurant, but as Gerald becomes more comfortable doing the job, he begins to lose himself. Vanessa helps Sara text a sexy picture to Bruce, which leads to embarrassing results. After getting advice from Annelise, Ravi becomes more serious about his job as the head chef of the kitchen.
10	"Perfect Physical Specimen"	Tristram Shapeero	Isaac Aptaker & Elizabeth Berger	January 5, 2016	1AYY11	3.02
As Gerald and Vanessa worry over Edie's upcoming ear tube surgery, Jimmy reveals he hasn't seen a medical doctor in 20 years. Jimmy then worries about a suspicious mole found during his checkup, which Sara tricked him into having, despite the doctor (Dr. Phil McGraw) telling him there is only a two percent chance of the mole being cancerous. Meanwhile, Annelise and Ravi discover a safe Jimmy has hidden behind a wall hanging, and ponder what its contents might be.
11	"The Sat Pack"	Alex Reid	Dan Klein	January 12, 2016	1AYY10	2.65
Jimmy is reunited with his old Saturday party crew, self-named "The Sat Pack", including his best friend Ronnie (Bob Saget). The crew's plans for a night of carousing are brought down by Gerald, who arrives just after Frankie has dumped him. Later, Sara texts Jimmy that she has just broken up with Bruce, who is taking a job in China, so Jimmy makes a stop to comfort her. Though the Sat Pack is disappointed about the interruptions, Ronnie finds himself envious of Jimmy's family ties.
12	"Baby Model"	Alex Reid	Story by : Jhoni Marchinko; Teleplay by : Isaac Aptaker & Elizabeth Berger	January 19, 2016	1AYY13	2.50
While playing with Edie in a park, Jimmy is approached by Leslie (Leslie Grossman), a talent scout who encourages him to have Edie try out for a Fuzzy Fruit advertising campaign the next day. Gerald isn't thrilled about Edie doing modeling, but Vanessa is, so she and Jimmy secretly sneak Edie to the audition. At the restaurant, Annelise learns that the new prep cook is interested in her, and that Ravi is trying to set up the two.
13	"Tableside Guacamole"	Jim Hensz	Greg Lisbe & Jared Miller	January 26, 2016	1AYY12	2.52
Annelise says restaurant patrons are down 15 percent since Jimmy became "distracted" with his new family obligations, so they resolve to bring in a big star to reboot Jimmy's. The two convince hot pop singer Chason Fernwick (Ryan Hansen) to bring his entourage there in hopes that some will post about the restaurant on social media. They even indulge Chason's demands, such as a 1980s theme and having Ravi make tableside guacamole. Sara is thrilled to tag along, calling the 80s "my decade", but she begins to feel old and out of place when she mingles with the much younger guests.
14	"Budget Spa"	Chris Koch	Laura Chinn	February 2, 2016	1AYY14	2.53
After Sara suggests that Jimmy's addiction to "female validation" affects his lack of commitment, he tries to prove her wrong by shunning a date and going with the guys to an all-male Korean spa. But it isn't long before Jimmy falls back into his old habits, and starts to realize that Sara may be right. Meanwhile, Sara, Vanessa and Annelise go out to a hip, upscale bar and soon decide it's not their kind of place.
15	"The Biter"	Stuart McDonald	Sam Laybourne	February 9, 2016	1AYY15	2.42
Sara and Jimmy are called to Edie's preschool when the teacher can't get a hold of Gerald or Vanessa, and they learn that another child bit Edie. After being told school policy prohibits them from learning the name of the biter, Sara and Jimmy play detective to try and crack the case on their own. Elsewhere, Ravi helps Gerald and Vanessa pitch one of Gerald's apps to an investor named Kirk Kelly (Drake Bell).
16	"Gerald Fierce"	Chris Koch	Dan Klein	February 16, 2016	1AYY16	2.23
Having sold his first app, Gerald has a new confidence and takes advantage of his status as a "tech mogul" by approaching a girl at the restaurant. Proud papa Jimmy takes a picture of Gerald kissing the girl and posts it on social media, only to see the girl's ex-boyfriend reply with threats of great bodily harm. Jimmy later has to decide between prepping for his cover shoot for SoCal Cuisine magazine or defending his son. Meanwhile, Sara thinks Vanessa is taking advantage of her when she is roped into painting Edie's bedroom, but she later sees how much Vanessa really has going on in her life.
17	"The Boyfriend Experience"	Rebecca Asher	Greg Lisbe & Jared Miller	February 23, 2016	1AYY17	2.17
Sara is invited to an engagement party for an old friend and doesn't want to show up dateless, so she reluctantly agrees to let Jimmy take her. Jimmy lies to some guests that he and Sara have been dating for two years, which causes problems when Sara runs into Craig (Michael Trucco), a guy with whom she once had a brief fling, and Craig's date Juliet (Brooke Lyons) whispers that Jimmy slept with her less than a year ago. Meanwhile, Gerald and Vanessa ponder what to do about Edie, who is going through a phase where she wants to flush everything down the toilet.
18	"Catherine Sanders"	John Fortenberry	Jeremy Hall	March 1, 2016	1AYY18	2.03
Jimmy meets the beautiful, glass-ceiling-breaking CEO Catherine Sanders (Regina Hall) at a book signing and the two start dating, but Jimmy soon realizes he is the less dominant half of the relationship and doesn't know how to handle it. At the same time, Sara has started seeing Craig regularly, but soon finds Craig may want more from the relationship than she does. Elsewhere, Gerald and Vanessa search for office space, which brings them closer together.
19	"Some Guy I'm Seeing"	Michael McDonald	Jeremy Bronson & Laura Krafft	March 8, 2016	1AYY19	1.94
Jimmy and Catherine are getting along so well that Jimmy actually wants be exclusive with her and begins calling her his girlfriend. He gets upset, however, when he overhears Catherine's end of a phone conversation in which she refers to him as "some guy I'm seeing." Meanwhile, Gerald and Vanessa try to begin life as a couple, but then have a bad experience when Gerald invites Vanessa to the traditional Friday Movie Night he has with Sara, making him think they have no common interests.
20	"Jimmy's 50th, Again"	Ken Whittingham	Story by : Dan Fogelman; Teleplay by : Isaac Aptaker & Elizabeth Berger	April 26, 2016	1AYY20	1.78
It's Jimmy's 51st birthday, but he tells Catherine it's his 50th. In a series of flashbacks, Jimmy recalls his estranged father Jack (Paul Sorvino) attending last year's 50th party and criticizing his lifestyle, while Gerald recalls struggling to connect with Vanessa, losing his job, and telling Sara that he wants to meet his father. Catherine confides in Annelise that she plans to tell Jimmy she loves him, but she later sees Jimmy and Sara share a moment and changes her mind. Jimmy receives a phone call and learns that his father has died.
21	"The Memorial"	Rebecca Asher	Story by : Isaac Aptaker & Elizabeth Berger; Teleplay by : Dan Fogelman	May 3, 2016	1AYY21	1.84
Jimmy starts throwing himself into work, rather than dealing with the grief of losing his father. His family and friends see this, and convince him to hold a memorial to get closure. Ravi discovers a ring Gerald is hiding, and Gerald confesses that he plans to propose to Vanessa. Meanwhile, Sara is taking a long time to accept or reject Craig's offer to move in together. Shortly after she accepts, she sees Jimmy in a vulnerable moment, and gives him a long kiss.
22	"The Cure"	Chris Koch	Jeremy Bronson & Danny Chun	May 10, 2016	1AYY22	1.64
Gerald's attempt at planning the perfect marriage proposal for Vanessa has a number of stumbles along the way, but Vanessa eventually does accept. Meanwhile, Jimmy and Sara decide they are right for each other and mutually agree to break up with their current partners. When Jimmy goes to break up with Catherine, however, he learns she is heading out of town on a business trip and he doesn't think the timing is good. He later runs to the airport to take care of the breakup, but by then, Sara has found out that he lied, causing her to question if he's really changed.

== Home media ==
Name	Region 1	Region 2	Region 4	Discs
Grandfathered: The Complete Series	November 24, 2017	—N/a	—N/a	2
