= The Mindy Project =

2012 American romantic comedy TV series

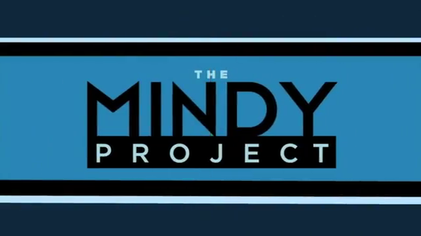
- Genre: Romantic comedy; Cringe comedy; Sitcom
- Created by: Mindy Kaling
- Showrunner: Mindy Kaling
- Starring: Mindy Kaling; Chris Messina; Ed Weeks; Anna Camp; Zoe Jarman; Amanda Setton; Stephen Tobolowsky; Ike Barinholtz; Beth Grant; Xosha Roquemore; Adam Pally; Garret Dillahunt; Fortune Feimster; Rebecca Rittenhouse
- Music by: Jesse Novak
- Country of origin: United States
- Original language: English
- No. of seasons: 6
- No. of episodes: 117 (list of episodes)

Production
- Executive producers: Mindy Kaling; Howard Klein; Jack Burditt; Matt Warburton; Charlie Grandy; Michael Spiller; Tracey Wigfield; Tucker Cawley; B. J. Novak (pilot); Charles McDougall (pilot)
- Producers: Mychelle Deschamps; Jeremy Bronson; Ike Barinholtz; David Stassen; Lorie Zerweck; Dan Kaplow (pilot)
- Editors: David Rogers; Rob Burnett; Mat Greenleaf
- Camera setup: Single-camera
- Running time: 22–31 minutes
- Production companies: 3 Arts Entertainment; Kaling International; Universal Television (Note: Credited as Open 4 Business Productions in copyright.)

Original release
- Network: Fox
- Release: September 25, 2012 – March 24, 2015
- Network: Hulu
- Release: September 15, 2015 – November 14, 2017

The Mindy Project is an American romantic comedy television series created by and starring Mindy Kaling that began airing on Fox in September 2012 and finished its six-season run on Hulu in November 2017. The series was co-produced by Universal Television and 3 Arts Entertainment.

== Plot ==
The series follows obstetrician/gynecologist Mindy Lahiri as she tries to balance her personal and professional life, surrounded by quirky co-workers in a small medical practice in New York City. The character was inspired by Kaling's own mother, an OB/GYN. Mindy explores life with the help of her co-workers: Danny Castellano, her best friend and love interest, whose religious sensibilities occasionally cause some tension; Jeremy Reed, an English physician who manages the practice; Peter Prentice, another physician who was a fraternity jock while attending Dartmouth; Morgan Tookers, a wacky, yet lovable registered nurse and an ex-con; Tamra Webb, a blunt nurse; and Beverley Janoszewski, the libidinous older office receptionist.

== Cast and characters ==
Actor	Character	Seasons					
Actor	Character	1	2	3	4	5	6
Mindy Kaling	Dr. Mindy Kuhel Lahiri	Main	Main	Main	Main	Main	Main
Chris Messina	Dr. Daniel Alan "Danny" Castellano	Main	Main	Main	Main	Guest	Recurring
Ed Weeks	Dr. Jeremiah "Jeremy" Reed	Main	Main	Main	Main	Main	Main
Anna Camp	Gwendolyn "Gwen" Grandy	Main					
Zoe Jarman	Betsy Putch	Main	Main				
Amanda Setton	Shauna Dicanio	Main					
Stephen Tobolowsky	Dr. Marc Shulman	Main			Guest		
Ike Barinholtz	Nurse Morgan Tookers	Main	Main	Main	Main	Main	Main
Beth Grant	Beverly Janiszewski	Main	Main	Main	Main	Main	Main
Xosha Roquemore	Nurse Tamra Webb	Recurring	Main	Main	Main	Main	Main
Adam Pally	Dr. Peter Prentice		Main	Main	Recurring	Guest	Guest
Fortune Feimster	Nurse Colette Kimball-Kinney				Main	Main	Main

=== Main ===
- Mindy Kaling as Dr. Mindy Kuhel Lahiri, a romantically frustrated OB/GYN at Shulman & Associates.
- Chris Messina as Dr. Daniel Alan "Danny" Castellano (seasons 1–4; guest season 5; recurring season 6), another OB/GYN (formerly at Shulman & Associates, now at Freedom Tower Women's Health), Mindy's main frenemy and love interest.
- Ed Weeks as Dr. Jeremiah "Jeremy" Reed, OB/GYN, Mindy and Danny's somewhat hapless co-partner at the office.
- Anna Camp as Gwendolyn "Gwen" Grandy (season 1), Mindy's best friend who has settled down with a family.
- Zoe Jarman as Betsy Putch (seasons 1–2), a former receptionist at the office.
- Amanda Setton as Shauna Dicanio (season 1), a former receptionist at the office.
- Stephen Tobolowsky as Dr. Marc Shulman (season 1; guest season 4), a former senior partner of the practice.
- Ike Barinholtz as Morgan Fairchild Ransom Tookers, a registered nurse and ex-con at the office.
- Beth Grant as Beverly Janoszewski, a former nurse turned receptionist at the office.
- Xosha Roquemore as Tamra Webb (seasons 2–6; recurring season 1), a nurse at the office. She has a long-term boyfriend, Ray Ron, for 20 years but breaks up with him to date Morgan. She name drops famous men she has dated.
- Adam Pally as Dr. Peter Prentice (seasons 2–3; guest season 4; recurring seasons 5–6), Mindy's best friend and an OB/GYN at the office.
- Fortune Feimster as Colette Kimball-Kinney (seasons 4–6), a nurse at the office and sister of Jody. She and Morgan eventually move in together.

=== Recurring ===
- Garret Dillahunt as Dr. Jody Kimball-Kinney (seasons 4–6), an OB/GYN who joins Shulman & Associates during Mindy's maternity leave.
- Rebecca Rittenhouse as Dr. Anna Ziev (seasons 5–6), a young, put-together uptight doctor in the office who becomes a new foil for Mindy.
- Mark Duplass as Brendan Deslaurier, a midwife.
- Rhea Perlman as Annette Castellano, Danny's mother.
- Anders Holm as Casey Peerson, a Christian minister and Mindy's ex-fiancé.
- Glenn Howerton as Heathcliff "Cliff" Gilbert, a lawyer in the same building as Shulman & Associates and Mindy's ex-boyfriend.
- Jenny O'Hara as Dot, Annette's best friend.
- Tommy Dewey as Josh Daniels, a lawyer and Mindy's ex-boyfriend.
- Jay Duplass as Duncan Deslaurier, a midwife.
- Tracey Wigfield as Dr. Lauren Neustadter (originally Dr. Lauren Barinholtz), Jeremy's ex-girlfriend who later marries Peter.
- Dan Bakkedahl as Dr. Adrian Bergdahl, an OB/GYN who joins Shulman & Associates after Peter's departure.
- Mort Burke as Parker, an intern at the office.
- Utkarsh Ambudkar as Rishi Lahiri, an aspiring rapper and Mindy's younger brother.
- Mary Grill as Maggie, Mindy's teacher friend.
- Max Minghella as Richie Castellano, Danny's younger brother.
- Chloë Sevigny as Christina Porter, Danny's ex-wife.
- Andrew Bachelor as Dr. T.J. Gigak, Mindy's intern at the hospital.
- Kelen Coleman as Alex, Mindy's friend.
- Bill Hader as Dr. Tom McDougall, a dentist and Mindy's ex-boyfriend.
- Tate Ellington as Dr. Rob Gurgler, Mindy's fellowship advisor in San Francisco and old friend of Danny's.
- Jack Davenport as Leland Breakfast, an old school chum of Jeremy's and he is a serious theatre actor.
- Richard Gant as Melville Fuller, Mindy's accountant.
- Niecy Nash as Dr. Jean Fishman, the chief of OB/GYN at the hospital where Mindy works.
- Gita Reddy as Neepa, a member of the fellowship Mindy's participating in.
- Chinedu Unaka as MLK, the fraternity brother of Peter and Jeremy. They reunite at a Dartmouth alumni ceremony.
- B. J. Novak as Jamie, Mindy's ex-boyfriend.
- Tim Daly as Charlie Lang, a police officer and Mindy's ex-boyfriend.
- Joanna Garcia Swisher as Sally Prentice, Peter's sister. She dates Danny.
- Ellie Kemper as Heather, Josh's ex-girlfriend and Mindy's neighbour. She dates Cliff and then he breaks up with her to date Mindy.
- Rob McElhenney as Lou Tookers, Morgan's cousin.
- Cristin Milioti as Whitney, a Wall Street coke head stockbroker who dated Jeremy.
- Eliza Coupe as Chelsea, Mindy and Danny's neighbour and love interest for Morgan. Mindy and she become close friends and confidants.
- Jay R. Ferguson as Drew Schakowsky, head football coach at Princeton. Drew and Mindy date until he doesn't show interest in Leo.
- Sakina Jaffrey as Sonu Lahiri, Mindy's mother.
- Ajay Mehta as Tarun Lahiri, Mindy's father.
- Randall Park as Dr. Colin Lee, an ophthalmologist and Mindy's friend.
- Josh Peck as Ray Ron, Tamra's ex-boyfriend. They dated for 20 years and broke up when Tamra started dating Morgan.
- Kevin Smith as himself.
- Julia Stiles as Dr. Jessica Lieberstein, a hoarder colleague of Danny and Mindy's who ends up dating Morgan. Danny wanted to set her up with Peter but she was interested in Morgan. She breaks up with Morgan because he lets himself go and gains weight.
- Allison Williams as Jillian or "Eyepatch", Danny's ex-girlfriend. They break up because Danny doesn't take interest in her life and because of their large age gap.
- Bryan Greenberg as Ben, a pediatric nurse forced to deal with Mindy and her child's ever-changing illnesses. Ben and Mindy start dating and eventually get married and then divorced.
- Julie Bowen as Daisy, an overbearing mother at Leo's school.
- Ana Ortiz as Dr. Mary Hernandez, a doctor at a rival women's clinic.
- Tipper Newton as Karen, Colette's girlfriend.

== Episodes ==
Season	Episodes	Originally released		
Season	Episodes	First released	Last released	Network
1	24	September 25, 2012	May 14, 2013	Fox
2	22	September 17, 2013	May 6, 2014	Fox
3	21	September 16, 2014	March 24, 2015	Fox
4	26	September 15, 2015	July 5, 2016	Hulu
5	14	October 4, 2016	March 28, 2017	Hulu
6	10	September 12, 2017	November 14, 2017	Hulu

== Production and development ==
The series was initially commissioned by NBC, but the pilot with the working title It's Messy was released from NBC's projects on January 27, 2012. NBC then sent the script to Fox executives who read it over that following weekend. On January 30, 2012, Fox green-lit the pilot, with Mindy Kaling attached to star.

On May 9, 2012, Fox placed a series order for the comedy. Two days later, the title was changed from It's Messy to The Mindy Project. On August 27, 2012, the pilot episode was made available to view online on various sites including Fox, in an attempt to garner interest in the series. On October 8, 2012, Fox ordered a full season of The Mindy Project. On March 4, 2013, the series was renewed for a second season, which began on September 17, 2013. On November 21, 2013, Fox announced that The Mindy Project would take a mid-season hiatus, before returning on April 1, 2014. Fox announced the third season renewal of The Mindy Project on March 7, 2014.

On May 6, 2015, Fox cancelled the series after three seasons. On May 15, 2015, Hulu picked up the show, commissioning a 26 episode fourth season. On May 4, 2016, Hulu announced it had picked up the series for a 16-episode season 5, which was later reduced to 14. On March 29, 2017, Kaling announced the series would return for a sixth and final season; the final episode of the series aired on November 14, 2017.

Casting announcements for the remaining series regular roles began in February 2012, with Ed Weeks cast in the role of Dr. Jeremy Reed, a sexy, British doctor in the practice. Zoe Jarman and Dana DeLorenzo then joined in series regular roles. Jarman signed on to play Betsy Putch, an upbeat receptionist at the practice; whilst Delorenzo joined as Shauna Dicanio, a young, party loving receptionist in the practice. In mid-March, Chris Messina joined the cast as Dr. Danny Castellano, an arrogant doctor who works at the practice. Shortly after, Anna Camp boarded the series as Gwen Grandy, a stay-at-home mom and Mindy's best friend.

A few months later, Amanda Setton, Stephen Tobolowsky and Ike Barinholtz joined the series. Setton replaced Dana DeLorenzo in the role of Shauna; Tobolowsky joined in the series regular role of Dr. Marc Shulman, the senior partner of the practice; and Barinholtz signed onto the recurring role of Morgan Tookers, a quirky rehabilitated ex-con who joins the practice as a nurse.

=== Cast changes ===
The first change occurred when Stephen Tobolowsky's role was eliminated after the second episode – following re-shoots that saw his character be re-written into a mere authoritarian figure in the office – when it was decided that "they didn't really want Mindy to have a boss in the office". Tobolowsky returned, albeit in a voice-over only role, in the eighth episode to explain that his character had retired. The second change of the season, which was first reported on November 20, 2012, saw Amanda Setton's role also eliminated and Anna Camp downgraded to a recurring cast member. They both departed after the twelfth episode. Despite becoming a recurring cast member, Camp only made a single appearance in the seventeenth episode. Neither Setton or Camp's characters had their absence referenced, nor were they mentioned again.

The first change for the second season, which occurred before production of the season began, saw Xosha Roquemore upgraded to a series regular role after recurring in the final three episodes of the previous season. The second change, which occurred just prior to the production of the season's fifth episode, resulted in Adam Pally also being upgraded to a series regular role. He had previously signed onto the series in a recurring role but had filmed only two episodes prior to being promoted.

The first change of the third season occurred prior to the start of production and saw Zoe Jarman's role eliminated from the show. Like Setton and Camp's departures in the first season, the absence of her character was never addressed. The second cast change of the season was announced on November 21, 2014, and saw Adam Pally leave the series after the season's thirteenth episode. His departure after the thirteenth episode of the season was a condition of his upgrade to a series regular that had occurred the previous year. It was reported that Pally is "expected to make occasional guest appearances". Pally made multiple guest appearances after his departure, where he was still credited amongst the regular cast in episodes he appeared, making his final appearance as a part of the main cast in the third-season finale.

In December 2015 it was reported that Fortune Feimster had been upgraded to a series regular role beginning with the fourteenth episode of the fourth season, after appearing in seven of the first thirteen episodes. Garret Dillahunt joined the show in a major recurring role as Dr. Jody Kimball-Kinney.

In June 2016, it was announced that Chris Messina would not be returning as a series regular for season five, but would instead appear as a guest star.

== Reception ==
=== Critical reception ===
The Mindy Project received positive reviews from critics, with many highlighting Kaling's performance and her unique character, as well as the writing and directing. On Rotten Tomatoes, the first season holds an approval rating of 81% based on 48 reviews, with an average rating of 7/10. The site's critical consensus reads, "The Mindy Project is such a charming comedy, led by Mindy Kaling's impressive talent, that its faults are easy to forgive." Review aggregation website Metacritic, which assigns a weighted mean based on reviews from mainstream critics, the season received a score of 69 out of 100 based on 32 critics, indicating "generally favorable reviews". It was the number-six best-reviewed show according to the site's fall 2012 season.

On Rotten Tomatoes, the second season has an approval rating of 89% based on 18 reviews, with an average rating of 6.8/10. The site's critical consensus reads, "Mindy Kaling earns consistent laughs with wit, charm and physical comedy, as she and her cast grow into well-rounded and familiar, albeit peculiar, characters." On Metacritic, the second season has a score of 55 out of 100, based on four critics, indicating "mixed or average reviews". Season 3 of the show holds an approval rating of 82% on Rotten Tomatoes with the critical consensus reading, "The Mindy Project, while still wildly funny, travels further into rom-com country this season."

Season 4 of the show holds an approval rating of 93% on Rotten Tomatoes with the critical consensus reading, "The Mindy Project begins its online migration with some of the show's best-ever episodes, further refining the balance between heart and humor struck during the first three seasons." On Metacritic the season has a score of 81 out of 100, based on 5 critics, indicating "universal acclaim".

==== Criticism ====
The Mindy Project has been the object of scrutiny not only from traditional media forms but also from feminists and people of color, who often weigh in on the show's decisions in casting and writing. At the end of the first season, Jezebel posted an article called "Mindy Kaling Only Makes Out with White Guys", a critique of the casting of romantic leads on the show. The same article contains a response from Nisha Chittal, who has defended Kaling's success in the past, who applauded the show for not making Kaling's race central to her character, and for showing that an Indian woman could date non-Indian men.

During the second season, the episode "Mindy Lahiri Is a Racist," which addresses white supremacy, provoked discussion as to whether or not Kaling had made "reparations" for showing a predominantly white cast.

Before the third season began airing, Kaling received criticism for a comment in a Flare article entitled "She's the Boss", in which she stated that the show would not address abortion, as "it would be demeaning to the topic to talk about it in a half-hour sitcom." In an appearance on The Colbert Report two weeks later, she clarified:

A lot of women look to me and look to the show, and they want me to be a spokesperson for a lot of issues, and I actually think that's a responsibility that's cool, I want to live up to that ... I want to be able to talk plainly on things but I also want to create an entertaining show. We haven't found a hilarious take on abortion that has not been done yet—but we might. I have faith in us.

Contrasting with the above criticism, a 2021 Feminist Media Studies article titled "Un/accented: the politics of difference in US popular culture" argues that some of the criticism that The Mindy Project received, regarding the predominately white love interests or absence of Indian cultural reference, is not necessarily an issue for Kaling to address but rather indicative of how critics and journalists only see Kaling's work through surface level analysis and how many non-white bodies are present instead of what the work is actually critiquing through dialogue or plot.

=== Ratings ===
Viewership and ratings per season of The Mindy Project
Season	Timeslot (ET)	Episodes	First aired		Last aired		TV season	Viewership rank	Avg. viewers (millions)
Season	Timeslot (ET)	Episodes	Date	Viewers (millions)	Date	Viewers (millions)	TV season	Viewership rank	Avg. viewers (millions)
1	Tuesday 9:30 pm (1–19, 21–24); Thursday 9:30 pm (20)	24	September 25, 2012	4.67	May 14, 2013	2.57	2012–13	118	3.71
2	Tuesday 9:30 pm (1–14, 16, 18–22); Thursday 9:30 pm (15, 17)	22	September 17, 2013	3.83	May 6, 2014	2.48	2013–14	125	3.40
3	Tuesday 9:30 pm	21	September 16, 2014	2.68	March 24, 2015	2.05	2014–15	151	2.95

=== Awards and nominations ===
Year	Award	Category	Nominee	Result	Ref
2012	Critics' Choice Television Award	Most Exciting New Series		Won	
2012	Writers Guild of America Award	Television: Best Written New Series		Nominated	
2013	People's Choice Awards	Favorite New TV Comedy		Nominated	
2013	Gracie Awards	Outstanding Producer – Entertainment	Mindy Kaling	Won	
2013	NAACP Image Award	Outstanding Comedy Series		Nominated	
2013	TCA Awards	Outstanding New Program		Nominated	
2013	Teen Choice Awards	Choice TV: Breakout Show		Nominated	
2013	Teen Choice Awards	Choice TV Actress: Comedy	Mindy Kaling	Nominated	
2013	TV Guide Awards	Favorite New Series		Nominated	
2013	Casting Society of America	Outstanding Achievement in Casting – Television Pilot Comedy	Felicia Fasano	Won	
2014	Critics' Choice Television Award	Best Actor in a Comedy Series	Chris Messina	Nominated	
2014	Gracie Awards	Outstanding Female Actor in a Leading Role in a Comedy Series	Mindy Kaling	Won	
2014	NAACP Image Award	Outstanding Actress in a Comedy Series	Mindy Kaling	Nominated	
2014	People Magazine Awards	TV Couple of the Year	Mindy Kaling and Chris Messina	Won	
2014	TCA Awards	Outstanding Achievement in Comedy		Nominated	
2014	TCA Awards	Individual Achievement in Comedy	Mindy Kaling	Nominated	
2014	Teen Choice Awards	Choice TV Actress: Comedy	Mindy Kaling	Nominated	
2014	Teen Choice Awards	Choice Comedian	Mindy Kaling	Nominated	
2015	Satellite Award	Best Actress – Television Series Musical or Comedy	Mindy Kaling	Won	
2015	Critics' Choice Television Award	Best Actor in a Comedy Series	Chris Messina	Nominated	
2015	NAACP Image Award	Outstanding Actress in a Comedy Series	Mindy Kaling	Nominated	
2015	NAACP Image Award	Outstanding Writer in a Comedy Series	Mindy Kaling	Nominated	
2015	NAACP Image Award	Outstanding Director in a Comedy Series	Ken Whittingham	Nominated	
2015	Primetime Emmy Award	Outstanding Costumes for a Contemporary Series, Limited Series, or Movie	Salvador Pérez Jr.	Nominated	
2016	Satellite Award	Best Actor – Television Series Musical or Comedy	Chris Messina	Nominated	
2016	Gracie Awards	Outstanding Ensemble Cast – Comedy		Won	
2017	People's Choice Awards	Favorite Premium Comedy Series		Nominated	

== International broadcast ==
- In the United Kingdom, the show airs on Sky Comedy. It used to air on E4 until 2015
- In Canada the show was aired by City. A network spokesperson confirmed that The Mindy Project would continue to air new episodes on City City didn't air Season 6 until January 2018. (Hulu is not accessible in Canada.)
- In Oceania the show airs for Australia on the Seven Network from January 28, 2013, at 10PM Mondays and for New Zealand on FOUR from March 11, 2013, at 9:30PM Mondays.
- In Europe the show aired from March 26, 2013, at 9:30PM Tuesdays, for the Netherlands on Foxlife from January 20, 2014, at 8:30PM Mondays and for Spain on Cosmopolitan TV from January 23, 2014, at 9:30PM Thursdays. In Germany the show airs on Comedy Central Germany since 2013.
