= Laurence Clark =

Laurence or Lawrence Clark may refer to:

- Laurence Clark (cartoonist) (born 1949), New Zealand cartoonist and illustrator
- Laurence Clark (comedian), British stand-up comedian, presenter and disability rights campaigner
- Lawrence Gordon Clark, English television director and producer

== See also ==
- Larry Clark (disambiguation)
- Lawrence Clarke (disambiguation)
