= 31 (film) =

- Theatrical release poster
- Directed by: Rob Zombie
- Written by: Rob Zombie
- Produced by: Rob Zombie; Mike Elliott; Andy Gould; Michael Sherman; Matthew Perniciaro; Eddie Vaisman
- Starring: Sheri Moon Zombie; Jeff Daniel Phillips; Lawrence Hilton-Jacobs; Meg Foster; Kevin Jackson; Richard Brake; Jane Carr; Judy Geeson; Malcolm McDowell
- Cinematography: David Daniel
- Edited by: Glenn Garland
- Music by: Rob Zombie; John 5; Zeuss; Bob Marlette
- Production companies: Bow + Arrow Entertainment; Spookshow International Films; Protagonist Pictures; Windy Hill Pictures; PalmStar Entertainment; Spectacle Entertainment Group
- Distributed by: Saban Films
- Release dates: January 23, 2016 (Sundance); September 16, 2016 (United States)
- Running time: 102 minutes
- Country: United States
- Budget: $1.5 million
- Box office: $922,727

31 is a 2016 American action horror film written, directed, and produced by Rob Zombie, and starring an ensemble cast featuring Sheri Moon Zombie, Jeff Daniel Phillips, Lawrence Hilton-Jacobs, Meg Foster, Richard Brake, Jane Carr, Judy Geeson, E.G. Daily, and Malcolm McDowell.

A period piece set in 1976, the film is about five carnies, who are kidnapped by a gang of homicidal clowns called "The Heads". The carnies are forced to play a survival game called "31", where they are chased by the clowns through a maze of rooms for over 12 hours. The penalty for capture is torture and murder, while bets are placed on the carnies' progress.

The film was crowdfunded online twice at fanbacked.com. At a test screening, Zombie compared 31 to his 2005 film The Devil's Rejects. It received mixed reviews, with multiple critics deeming it unoriginal.

== Plot ==
During Halloween 1976, a group of carnival workers, Charly, Venus, Panda, Levon and Roscoe, gleefully travel through the countryside. Later that night, the group is attacked by people disguised as scarecrows and taken to a strange, large building where three elderly people wearing aristocratic clothes, powdered wigs and make-up – known as Sister Dragon, Sister Serpent and (their leader) Father Napoleon-Horatio-Silas Murder – tell them that they are going to play the game "31" and that it will last for the next 12 hours. The group is placed in a maze-like set of rooms, where they must defend themselves against the "Heads", several murderous clowns who intend to torture and murder them; meanwhile the group are given odds for their survival and bets are placed on them.

The protagonists come across five "Heads": neo-Nazi Sick-Head, Psycho-Head, Schizo-Head, cross-dressing Death-Head, and Sex-Head. The carnies eventually manage to kill all of the assailants, but not without sustaining their own casualties, with only Charly, Venus and Roscoe left alive. The remaining three try to find a way out, but only manage to get one of their number – Venus – trapped inside a boiler room, where she is brutally murdered by the final Head, Doom-Head, who was brought in by the aristocrats to join the game. Doom-Head taunts Charly and Roscoe, telling them that the doors have been opened to the outside world.

The two manage to make it to one of the exits. However, Roscoe urges Charly to go on without him, as the night's event has left him too severely wounded to progress. Roscoe is then stabbed to death by Doom-Head. Charly, who made it outside but found herself in the middle of nowhere, makes her way into an abandoned house where she is ambushed by Doom-Head. He almost defeats her, but Doom-Head is stopped by the aristocrats, who tell him that time has run out and Charly must go free. The aristocrats are concerned that Charly is the first person to win "31". This doesn't satisfy Doom-Head; later he catches up with Charly, who is covered in blood and headed down an isolated road. He alights from a van and takes out his daggers as he and Charly prepare for one last confrontation as the film ends, leaving their fates unknown.

== Cast ==
- Sheri Moon Zombie as Charly / #5
- Jeff Daniel Phillips as Roscoe Pepper / #3
- Lawrence Hilton-Jacobs as Panda Thomas / #1
- Meg Foster as Venus Virgo / #2
- Richard Brake as "Doom-Head"
- Malcolm McDowell as "Father Napoleon-Horatio-Silas Murder"
- Judy Geeson as "Sister Dragon"
- Jane Carr as "Sister Serpent"
- Pancho Moler as "Sick-Head"
- Lew Temple as "Psycho-Head"
- David Ury as "Schizo-Head"
- E. G. Daily as "Sex-Head"
- Torsten Voges as "Death-Head"
- Ginger Lynn as "Cherry Bomb"
- Tracey Walter as Leo "Lucky Leo"
- Daniel Roebuck as Pastor Victor
- Devin Sidell as Georgina Victor
- Kevin Jackson as Levon Wally / #4
- Michael "Red Bone" Alcott as Randy "Fat Randy" Bumpagussy
- Esperanza Ibarra as "Snoopy"
- Andrea Dora as Trixie
- Gabriel Pimentel as Brumaire
- Jermain Hollman as Goon

== Production ==
Plans to create 31 were first announced in May 2014 via a teaser poster that showed the words "a Rob Zombie film", a bloody clown face, and the number "31". Fans and media outlets speculated that the film would be a third film in the House of 1000 Corpses and The Devil's Rejects universe and would follow Sid Haig's character Captain Spaulding, that it could be a film centering upon serial killer John Wayne Gacy, or that it would be a third film in Zombie's rebooted Halloween film series.

Zombie commented on the speculation, stating that it would not follow Captain Spaulding and would be an original story and was not based on any previous work. He also noted that 31 referred to October 31, Halloween. In July, Zombie announced the plot of 31, which follows a group of five people that are forced to participate in a gruesome game called "31".

Zombie also stated that he would use crowdfunding to cover part of the movie's costs, because "as the years go on, the game changes all the time, and a movie that you could get made years ago, you cannot get made anymore, because the business changes, things change." He added that crowdfunding would allow him to make a movie that might not have been otherwise funded traditionally and that "if you wanna do stuff outside the system, you've gotta function outside the system". Zombie later held a second Fanbacked.com campaign in February 2015 to raise additional funds for the film, stating that it was due to multiple requests from fans that wanted to contribute funding.

Zombie came up with the idea for 31 after reading a statistic that stated that Halloween is the "Number One day of the year when people go missing for some reason" and thought that it would make a good premise for a film. He also received inspiration for the film as he was walking around his frightfest Great American Nightmare and watched the employees work while dressed like chainsaw-carrying clowns. Zombie has stated that he wanted to have a "very nasty, gritty, guerilla-style approach to the filmmaking" for 31, as it "fits the story and the vibe of the movie". Zombie began scouting locations in the summer of 2014 and initial filming was slated to begin in February 2015, but did not commence until that March. Filming for 31 wrapped in April 2015.

== Release ==
31 premiered at the 2016 Sundance Film Festival on January 23. On March 23 that same year, Saban Capital Group announced its theatrical distribution rights acquisition from Alchemy, who was dealing with its financial woes and was in the process of selling off its previous acquisitions, for a limited release via its dedicated division, Saban Films, on September 16.

On September 1, Fathom Events hosted a special premiere of 31 in cinemas across the United States. The event included a world premier of the "Gore Whore" music video, and other activities.

=== Rating ===
31 was submitted to the Motion Picture Association of America twice and both times received an NC-17 rating. The description as given by the MPAA notes "sadistic graphic violence, bizarre sexuality/nudity, pervasive disturbing images and some strong language." On January 5, 2016, the film was finally granted an "R" rating for "strong bloody horror violence, pervasive language, sexual content and drug use". Zombie later told a fan on Facebook that the "Zombie Cut" would eventually be released on DVD and would include the uncut version.

=== Critical reception ===
The film holds an approval rating of 47% on Rotten Tomatoes based on 47 reviews and has an average rating of 5.43/10. The site's consensus reads, "31 delivers all the high-energy gore Rob Zombie fans have come to expect, but a lack of fresh ideas and likable characters mean only the already converted need apply". On Metacritic, which assigns a normalized rating, the film has a score of 35 out of 100 based on 13 reviews, indicating "generally unfavorable" reviews.

Much of the negative reaction to the film centered around claims that the film was forced and unoriginal, with Variety writing that the "energetic exercise in forced badassery will be too silly and self-conscious to feel genuinely edgy, despite all the blood spilt and familiar taboos violated."

The film received praise from Bloody Disgusting, which claimed "31 is Rob Zombie's The Running Man and it works". Trent Wilkie of Fangoria gave the film a mixed review saying "It is violent and campy, with the requisite sex, blood, profanity and gore. But ultimately, it feels rushed and leaves one with the sense of an unfinished idea." However, Jerry Smith, also writing for Fangoria, put it on his year's "Top Ten" list saying, "31 is a mean-as-hell, take-no-prisoners exploitation film filled to the absolute brim with mean-as-all-hell clowns, carnies and, by far, one of the best horror performances of the year."

Shock Till You Drop gave the film approval with a caveat saying "Rob Zombie's 31 succeeds as a throwback to the days of quickie exploitation movies. That's exactly what it is trying to be, and, what it is. So, if you want caviar, keep looking. But if you are in the mood for a candy-colored bacon cheeseburger of a flick with extra grease and BBQ sauce, 31 is for you". In a similar vein, Film School Rejects commented that "31 is Zombie's mildly entertaining take on a stale and simple setup. You already know if it's for you".

== Awards and nominations ==
Award	Category	Recipient(s)	Result
BloodGuts UK Horror Awards	Best Actor	Richard Brake	Nominated
BloodGuts UK Horror Awards	Best Supporting Actor	Malcolm McDowell	Nominated
BloodGuts UK Horror Awards	Best Supporting Actress	Meg Foster	Nominated
BloodGuts UK Horror Awards	Best Soundtrack/Score	John 5	Nominated
Fangoria Chainsaw Awards	Best Supporting Actor	Richard Brake	Nominated
Fright Meter Awards	Best Supporting Actor	Richard Brake	Won
Fright Meter Awards	Best Score	John 5, Rob Zombie	Nominated
Fright Meter Awards	Best Makeup	Wayne Toth	Nominated

== Home media ==
31 was exclusively released on Shudder two weeks before being released on DVD. The film was released on DVD and Blu-ray on December 20, 2016. The home release contained a behind-the-scenes documentary (a two-hour version on DVD/Blu-ray, four-hour version on VOD) directed by Josh Hasty.

== See also ==
- List of films set around Halloween
