= Jeremy Bronson =

American television producer and writer

- Born: New York City, United States
- Education: Harvard University
- Occupations: Writer, producer, comedian, actor

Jeremy Bronson (born June 18) is an American television producer and writer, best known for his work on The Mindy Project, Speechless, and Late Night with Jimmy Fallon. He is currently under an overall deal with ABC Studios.

== Early life ==
Bronson was born in New York City to Liliane (née Neubauer) and Dr. Michael Bronson, Chairman of the Department of Orthopedic Surgery, Mount Sinai West and Mount Sinai Morningside, and Chief of Joint Replacement Surgery at the Icahn School of Medicine at Mount Sinai in New York, and the author of extensive advances in the development of minimally invasive surgical instruments to advance unicondylar partial knee replacement.

He attended Scarsdale High School and graduated from Harvard University, where he wrote for the Harvard Lampoon.

== Career ==
Following graduation, Bronson worked as a political producer for MSNBC's Hardball with Chris Matthews. He went on to become the head monologue writer for Late Night with Jimmy Fallon, where he created the show's signature "Thank You Notes" segment. After Fallon, Bronson worked as a writer/producer for FOX's The Mindy Project and FOX's Grandfathered. He is a co-executive producer on ABC's Speechless as part of his overall deal with ABC Studios. In 2011, he was nominated for a Primetime Emmy Award.
