= Preventive mastectomy =

Surgical removal of the breasts to reduce breast cancer risk

- Specialty: General surgeon/plastic surgeon

A preventive mastectomy or prophylactic mastectomy or risk-reducing mastectomy (RRM) is an elective operation to remove the breasts so that the risk of breast cancer is reduced.

== Indications ==
The procedure is a surgical option for individuals who are at high risk for the development of breast cancer. High risk women without a prior history of personal breast cancer might consider bilateral risk-reducing mastectomy (BRRM) as an option for minimising the risk of primary breast carcinoma development. The procedure includes the surgical removal of both breasts before any pathologic diagnosis has been made. Women that were previously diagnosed with a breast cancer in one breast (ipsilateral breast cancer) might elect to undergo risk-reducing mastectomy of the other unaffected (contralateral) breast, that is to say contralateral risk-reducing mastectomy (CRRM), to minimize the risk of a second breast cancer development. CRRM has been shown to reduce the incidence of contralateral breast cancer, but there is not sufficient evidence that it improves survival. Women who had a bilateral mastectomy in 2013 were about 10 years younger than those who had a unilateral mastectomy.

This preventive operation pertains to women with these characteristics:

- BRCA1 or BRCA2 mutation carriers; this is the main indication for bilateral prophylactic mastectomy.
- Cancer in one breast and a family history of breast cancer.
- Family history of breast cancer. The genetic risk can be passed down through the mother's or father's side.
- Radiation therapy to the chest before the age of 30.
- Presence of high-risk breast lesions like lobular carcinoma in situ (LCIS), atypical ductal hyperplasia (ADH) and atypical lobular hyperplasia (ALH).
- Having dense breasts or breasts with diffuse microcalcification, as the screening for breast cancer is made difficult.

Discussions and decision should be made with the help of specialists who can use relevant information and statistical models to predict the individual lifetime risk of development of breast cancer.

Undergoing a preventive mastectomy does not guarantee that breast cancer will not develop later, however, it reduces the risk by 90% in high risk women. Also, a preventive mastectomy may not be able to remove all breast tissue as some of it may be in the arm pit, near the collar bone, or in the abdominal wall.

Male carriers of BRCA1 and BRCA2 mutations have a higher risk of breast cancer than other males, approximately 1.2% and 6.8%, but their risk is much lower than in female mutation carriers (about 60%) and lower than in the general female population (12%). Thus, preventive mastectomy has not been advocated for affected men.

== Procedure ==
In most situations the operation involves both breasts and thus represents a bilateral procedure. When cancer has affected already one breast, the other breast, still healthy, may be removed in a unilateral preventive mastectomy. Typically either a simple, a subcutaneous or a nipple-sparing mastectomy is performed. With the former the areola and nipple are removed, while the other two approaches preserve the nipple area for cosmetic reasons. To increase the viability of the nipple area for preservation during mastectomy, a so-called "nipple delay" procedure can be done several weeks before the mastectomy. Reconstructive breast surgery can be performed in the same surgical setting, added after the mastectomy. Saline or silicone implants may be used in the reshaping process and may be placed in a later setting.

A preventive mastectomy carries certain risks including those of anesthesia, bleeding, infection, pain, disfiguration, anxiety and disappointment.

After surgery, routine screening for breast cancer is recommended.

== Alternatives ==
There are other options to reduce the risk of future breast cancer. Intensified breast cancer screening for high risk women may detect cancer at an early, treatable stage. Certain medications that block the effect of estrogen (i.e. tamoxifen, raloxifen, exemestane) can reduce the risk by about 50% but also have side effects. Prophylactic salpingo-oophorectomy reduces estrogen levels and the risk of both ovarian and breast cancer, however, the reduction in breast cancer risk is about 50% in high risk women as compared to 90% when preventive mastectomy is done. Lifestyle changes (in weight, diet, exercise, avoidance of smoking, limiting alcohol) may reduce the risk to some degree.

== Acceptance ==
A factor that facilitates the decision to undergo a preventive mastectomy is that results of breast reconstructive surgery have improved. A 2004 Canadian study found that 70% of women were satisfied or extremely satisfied with the reconstruction after bilateral prophylactic mastectomy. In the United States preventive mastectomy is gaining increased acceptance. The decision of famous actresses such as Christina Applegate and Angelina Jolie to undergo preventive mastectomy has given the procedure wider media attention. The trend towards prophylactic mastectomy appears to be less pronounced in Europe and India.
