= Larry Clarke =

Canadian businessman (1925-2015)

- Born: June 12, 1925; London
- Died: October 22, 2015 (aged 90)
- Education: Osgoode Hall Law School; Eton College

Larry Denman Clarke (June 12, 1925 – October 22, 2015) was a Canadian businessman and the founder, president, chief executive officer, and chairman of SPAR Aerospace Limited, the designer of the Canadarm. He is a founding director of the Canadian Institute for Advanced Research, and from 1987 to 1991, was the chancellor of York University.

== Biography ==
Clarke was born in London to Edward Denman Clarke and Audrey Rant in 1925 and moved to Canada in 1939 after attending Eton College. After graduating from Trinity College School and serving as a technician in the Royal Canadian Navy during the second world war, he earned a law degree from Osgoode Hall Law School in 1949. He later worked in the Canadian Department of Defense and at de Havilland Aircraft before founding SPAR Aerospace and leading its acquisition from de Havilland in 1967.

In 1988, Clarke was made an Officer of the Order of Canada, and in 2004 he was awarded the Canadian Space Agency's Chapman Award for 2004 for "his remarkable contribution to the advancement of the Canadian Space Program".

Clarke died on October 22, 2015, in West Vancouver.

Academic offices
Preceded by John Tuzo Wilson	Chancellor of York University; 1986–1991	Succeeded by Oscar Peterson
