= Bill Moseley =

American actor (born 1951)

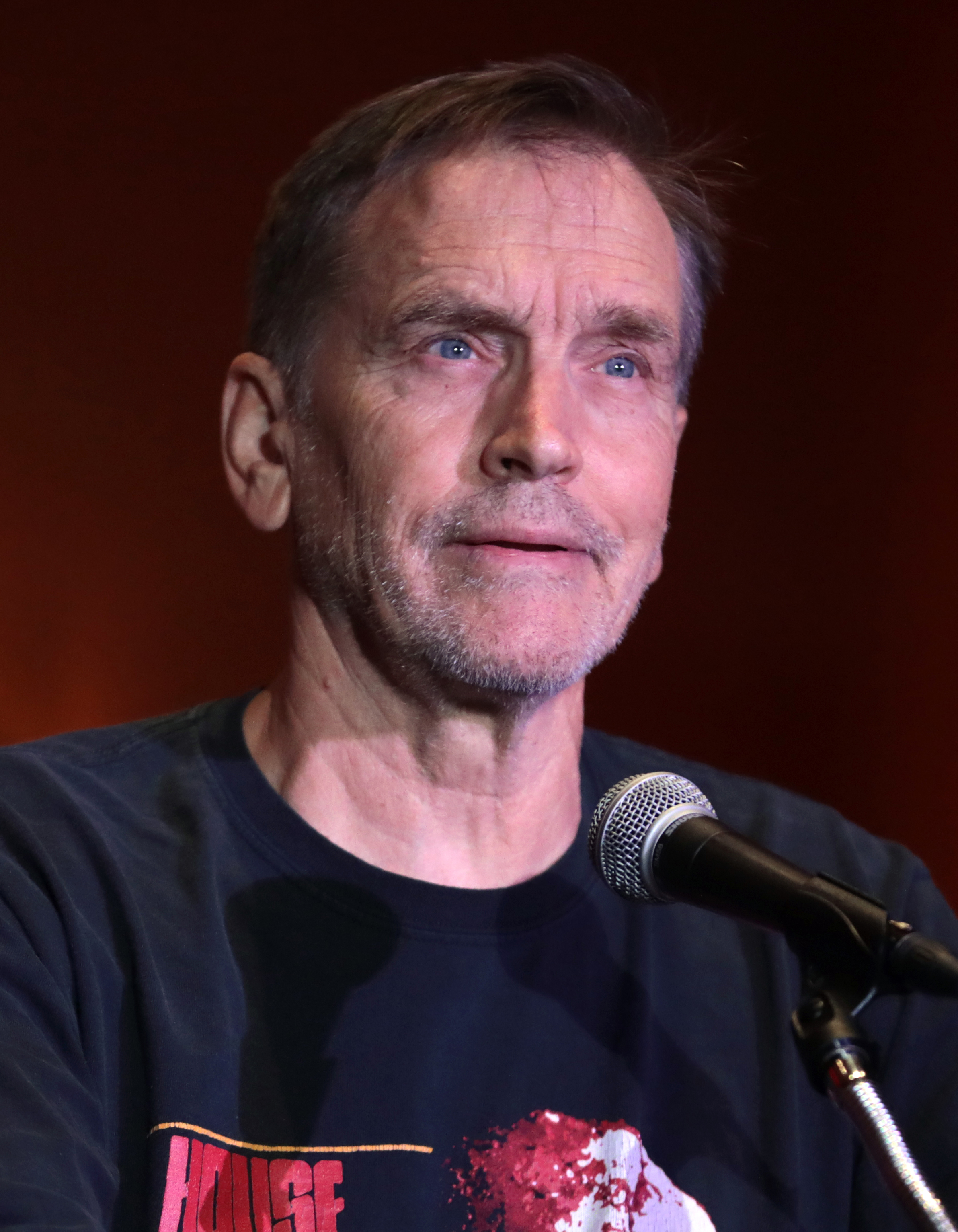
- Moseley in 2023
- Born: William Lambert Moseley; November 11, 1951 (age 74); Stamford, Connecticut, U.S.
- Education: Yale University
- Occupations: Actor; musician
- Years active: 1980–present
- Spouse: Lucinda Jenney (m. 2017)
- Children: 2

William Lambert Moseley (born November 11, 1951) is an American actor, primarily known for his performances in horror films. His best-known roles include Chop Top in The Texas Chainsaw Massacre 2 (1986), Otis B. Driftwood in Rob Zombie's Firefly trilogy, Luigi Largo in Repo! The Genetic Opera (2008), and The Magician in Alleluia! The Devil's Carnival (2015). He had a recurring role as camp cook Possum on the HBO TV series Carnivàle (2003–05). He has also released records with guitarist Buckethead in the band Cornbugs, as well as featuring on the guitarist's solo work.

== Early life ==
Moseley was born in Stamford, Connecticut, and grew up in Barrington Hills, Illinois. He is the son of Virginia Gillette (Kleitz), a journalist, and S. D. Moseley (Spencer Dumaresq Moseley), who was a member of the Yale Corporation, All-American captain and center of the 1942 Yale football team, and chairman and chief executive of the Railway Express Agency. His grandfather, George Moseley, also played football at Yale and was an All-American. He is a graduate of Yale University.

For a period of time, Moseley was a journalist, writing for such magazines as Omni, National Lampoon and Psychology Today.

== Acting career ==
At the age of 29, Moseley got his first film role in Alan Rudolph's Endangered Species as a cab driver. In 1985's Osa he played a character named "Quilt Face." His third role has become one of his most well known; he appeared as Chop Top in Tobe Hooper's The Texas Chainsaw Massacre 2, after Tobe Hooper saw him in the independent short, The Texas Chainsaw Manicure. In 2000 he reprised his role as Chop Top in All American Massacre, which was directed by Tobe Hooper's son William, but the film was never released to the public.

Two years after TCM 2, he played Frank in 1988's Mamba. Also in 1988 appeared as a soldier in the remake of the Steve McQueen film The Blob. He next played Darrell in the film Pink Cadillac starring Clint Eastwood. He then played the lead role of Ricky Caldwell in Silent Night, Deadly Night 3: Better Watch Out!.

In 1990, Moseley appeared in four films: Crash and Burn, The First Power, The End of Innocence, and, playing Johnny, in Tom Savini's remake of George A. Romero's 1968 zombie film, Night of the Living Dead. In 1993, he had a small role in the cult hit Army of Darkness as the Deadite Captain. A year later, he was featured in the video game Corpse Killer. In 1995, he did voiceover work for Anders Jacobsson's horror comedy film Evil Ed.

He would not, however, have another role as popular as Chop Top until 2003, when he starred as the maniacal serial killer Otis B. Driftwood (named after Groucho Marx's character from A Night at the Opera) in Rob Zombie's directorial debut House of 1000 Corpses. As Otis, he again became an icon in the horror community. In 2005, he reprised the role of Otis in the sequel The Devil's Rejects and in 2009 he played Otis in a voice cameo in Rob Zombie's animated film The Haunted World of El Superbeasto. Moseley's performance in Rejects inspired an independent campaign for a Best Supporting Actor Oscar nomination, which failed. He played in other Rob Zombie films such as Halloween and the Grindhouse fake trailer segment Werewolf Women of the SS.

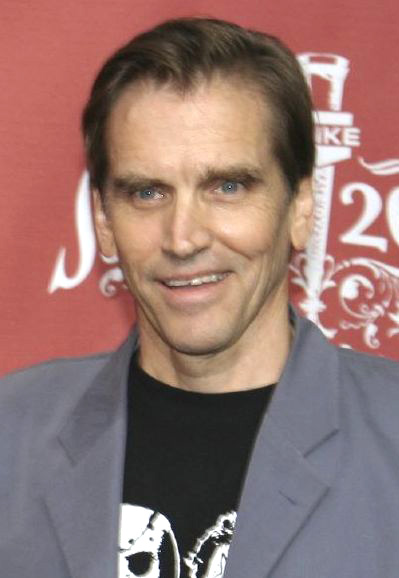
Moseley at the 2007 Scream Awards for his work on Repo! The Genetic Opera

In 2008, Moseley played the role of Luigi Largo in Repo! The Genetic Opera. In this futuristic, genetic opera, he was able to network with Nivek Ogre of Skinny Puppy and ohGr, subsequently appearing on ohGr's new album Devils in my Details. He mainly speaks at the beginning or ending of the songs in vivid, poetic rants. He appears on Eyecandy, Feelin' Chicken, Psychoreal, Timebomb, Smogharp, and Witness. Additionally, in 2008, Moseley appeared as a telemarketer in the music video for Combichrist's Sent to Destroy".

Moseley contributed songs to the 2008 soundtrack of Vampira: The Movie, a documentary by Kevin Sean Michaels on Maila Nurmi, in which he also stars. It was released on Collectables Records, a division of Alpha Video.

He appears as Kozlowski in Robert Lieberman's 2009 thriller film The Tortured, and in 2012 played as The Magician in The Devil's Carnival.

Moseley has also provided voice-over recordings for the Florida-based heavy metal band – Generichrist and also British goth-metal band Sinnergod on the track "Overture" which features on their 2013 debut album Seven Deadly Sinphonies.

He later made appearances in Texas Chainsaw 3D and American Exorcist.

In 2019, Moseley appeared in Gothic Harvest with Lin Shaye and Sofia Mattsson, directed by Ashley Hamilton. He also reprised his role as Otis B. Driftwood in 3 from Hell. Horror Fuel magazine reports that Moseley will star in the horror film Jasper alongside Michael Berryman, Kane Hodder and Bill Oberst in 2022.

He starred as, Captain Harris, in all 5 Ice Nine Kills music videos for their 2021 horror film-themed album The Silver Scream 2: Welcome to Horrorwood.

== Music career ==
Moseley (as Chop Top) was the lead singer of Cornbugs, a three-man band he had between 1999 and 2007 with avant-garde rock/metal guitarist Buckethead and Deli Creeps' drummer, Pinchface. He also contributed vocal parts to the songs I Come in Peace (as a news reporter) and Onions Unleashed (as Onions) from Buckethead's album Giant Robot (1994) and Jowls from Buckethead's album Monsters and Robots (1999), also as Chop Top.

Moseley, along with Rani Sharone, released albums No Way Down and The Devil Rides West, calling themselves Spider Mountain.

In 2017, Moseley released the album Bill & Phil: Songs of Darkness and Despair with Pantera frontman Philip Anselmo.

In 2021, Moseley collaborated with metal bands Black Tusk and Child Bite on a cover version of the Butthole Surfers song "Who Was in My Room Last Night?" He contributed vocals and appears in the music video.

== Personal life ==
Moseley is married to actress Lucinda Jenney, with whom he has a daughter. He previously dated model Lisa Lindsay-Hogg. Moseley and Lindsay-Hogg's daughter, Jane Moseley, is a model, painter and sculptor based in Los Angeles.

== In popular culture ==
A sample of Moseley shouting "dog will hunt!" in The Texas Chainsaw Massacre 2 is used in the hit Primus song "Jerry Was a Race Car Driver".

Moseley performed the spoken word intro in the song “Rave” by Pen Name.

== Filmography ==
=== Film ===
Year	Title	Role	Notes
1982	Endangered Species	Cab Driver	
1986	The Texas Chainsaw Massacre 2	Chop Top	
1986	Osa	Quilt Face	
1987	Nightmare Angel	Dr. William de Freis	Short Film
1988	The Blob	Soldier in Sewer	
1988	Fair Game	Frank	
1989	Pink Cadillac	Darrell	
1989	Silent Night, Deadly Night 3: Better Watch Out!	Ricky	Direct-to-video
1990	The First Power	Bartender	
1990	Crash and Burn	Quinn	Direct-to-video
1990	The End of Innocence	Man on the Hill	
1990	Night of the Living Dead	Johnny	
1991	White Fang	Luke	
1992	Inside Out 2	Dave	Segment: "I've Got a Crush on You"
1992	Honey, I Blew Up the Kid	Federal Marshal	
1992	Army of Darkness	Deadite Captain	
1993	Mr. Jones	Worker	
1995	Prehysteria 3!	Director	Direct-to-video
1995	Evil Ed	"Loose Limbs" Killer	Voice
2000	The Convent	Officer Ray	
2000	All American Massacre	Bloody Bobby	Unreleased
2002	Essence of Echoes	Dr. Hilcott	
2003	House of 1000 Corpses	Otis B. Driftwood	
2003	Vicious	Walace	Direct-to-video
2005	The Devil's Rejects	Otis B. Driftwood	
2006	Evil Bong	Bong World Patron	
2006	Fallen Angels	Westin	
2006	Thr3e	Slater	
2006	A Dead Calling	Chief Murken	Direct-to-video
2007	Grindhouse	Dr. Heinrich Von Strasser	Segment: "Werewolf Women of the SS"
2007	Home Sick	Mr. Suitcase	
2007	Halloween	Zach 'Z-Man' Garrett	
2008	A Perfect Place	Eddie	Short film
2008	Babysitter Wanted	Chief Dinneli	
2008	Repo! The Genetic Opera	Luigi Largo	
2008	Alone in the Dark II	Dexter	Direct-to-video
2008	The Alphabet Killer	Carl Tanner	
2008	House	Stewart	
2009	The Devil's Tomb	Professor Duncan	Direct-to-Video
2009	The Haunted World of El Superbeasto	Otis Driftwood	Voice
2009	Blood Night: The Legend of Mary Hatchet	Graveyard Gus	
2009	Dead Air	Logan	
2009	The Graves	Caleb 'Cookie' Atwood	
2010	2001 Maniacs: Field of Screams	Mayor George W. Buckman	
2010	Anderson's Cross	Mr. Daniels	
2010	Godkiller: Walk Among Us	Dr. West	Voice
2010	The Tortured	John Kozlowski	
2011	Spider Mountain: No Way Down	Ranger Bill	Short, direct-to-video
2011	Exit Humanity	General Williams	
2011	Night of the Little Dead	Kickstand	Short film
2012	Rogue River	Jon	
2012	Highway to Hell	Lemmas	Direct-to-video
2012	The Devil's Carnival	The Magician	
2012	The Inflicted	Mr. O'Hara	
2012	Dead Souls	Sheriff Depford	
2013	House of the Witchdoctor	Peter Van Hooten	
2013	Texas Chainsaw 3D	Drayton Sawyer	
2014	Disciples	Dread	
2014	Charlie's Farm	John Wilson	
2015	Almost Mercy	Pastor Johnson	
2015	Old 37	Darryl	
2015	The Art of Villainy	M?ster Nobody	Short film
2015	Night of the Living Dead: Origins 3D	Johnny	Voice
2016	Smothered	Soggy Christian	
2016	The Devil's Carnival: Alleluia!	The Magician	
2016	Alcoholist	Grey Speckled Man	
2016	The Horde	Jacob Sutter	Direct-to-video
2016	The Possession Experiment	Father Mark Campbell	
2016	Slayer: Pride in Prejudice	Nazi Father	Short, direct-to-video
2017	Death House	Giger	
2017	Boar	Bruce	
2018	Minutes to Midnight	Gimple	
2018	Cynthia	Buttercup	
2018	The Church	Pastor James	
2018	Crepitus	Crepitus	
2018	American Exorcist	Mr. Snowfeather	
2019	Shed of the Dead	Doc	
2019	Exorcism at 60,000 Feet	Garvan	
2019	To Your Last Death	Pavel	
2019	3 from Hell	Otis B. Driftwood	
2019	In Search of Darkness	Himself	Documentary
2019	Gothic Harvest	Detective Hollis	
2019	Big Top Evil	Mr. Kharver	
2019	Slayer: The Repentless Killogy	Nazi Dad	
2020	I Am Fear	Steve Mcreedy	
2020	In Search of Darkness: Part II	Himself	Documentary
2021	Prisoners of the Ghostland	The Governor	
2022	Sin Eater	Father Dunn	
2022	Dead by Midnight (Y2Kill)	Jasper	
2022	Nite Flirt	The Caller	Short Film
2023	Hayride to Hell	Farmer Sam	
2023	The Fetus	Maddox/Father of Alessa	
2023	Natty Knocks	Abner Honeywell	
2024	They Turned Us Into Killers	TBA	
2024	Stream	Jimmy	
TBA	Cotton Eye Joe †		

rowspan="1" |2026 | Blades in the Darkness II | Victor

=== Television ===
Year	Title	Role	Notes
1989	Freddy's Nightmares	Buzz	Episode: "Black Tickets"
1989	Tour of Duty	Sgt. Jones	Episode: "Terms of Enlistment"
1991	Father Dowling Mysteries	Kane / Larry Webster	Episode: "The Priest Killer Mystery"
1993	Up All Night	Himself	Episode: "Vice Academy"; uncredited
1994	Blood Run	Hank	Television film
1995	Fallen Angels	Customer #1	Episode: "A Dime a Dance"
1996	Unsolved Mysteries	David Young	Episode: #9.9
2002	Point of Origin	Task Force Officer	Television film
2002	Live from Baghdad	Rex	Television film
2003	The Practice	Jake Spooner	Episode: "Victims' Rights"
2004	ER	Charlie	Episode: "Forgive and Forget"
2003–2005	Carnivàle	Possum	8 episodes
2007	Days of Our Lives	Joel	3 episodes
2010–2019	Without Your Head	Himself	4 episodes
2012–2013	Holliston	Crazy Max	5 episodes
2014	Z Nation	General McCandles	Episode: "Full Metal Zombie"
2014	Teenage Mutant Ninja Turtles	Bernie	Episode: "In Dreams"
2015–2017	Adam Green's Scary Sleepover	Himself	3 episodes
2017	Uncle Grandpa	Additional Voices	Episode: "Uncle Grandpa's Odd-yssey"
2019	Slasher	Homeless Guy	2 episodes

=== Music videos ===
Year	Title	Role	Artist(s)
2021	"Who Was in My Room Last Night?"	Himself	Black Tusk; Child Bite
2021	"Hip to Be Scared"	Captain Harris	Ice Nine Kills
2021	"Assault & Batteries"	Captain Harris	Ice Nine Kills
2021	"Rainy Day"	Captain Harris	Ice Nine Kills
2021	"Funeral Derangements"	Captain Harris	Ice Nine Kills
2022	"The Shower Scene"	Captain Harris	Ice Nine Kills
2023	"Welcome to Horrorwood"	Captain Harris	Ice Nine Kills
2023	"Meat & Greet"	Captain Harris	Ice Nine Kills
2025	"The Great Unknown"	Ludwig von Leberkäse	Ice Nine Kills

=== Video games ===
Year	Title	Role	Notes
2024	The Texas Chain Saw Massacre	Bones	Voice
