= Stationary Odyssey =

- Origin: Evansville, Indiana, United States
- Genres: Art rock, post-rock
- Years active: 2002–2012
- Labels: Joyful Noise Recordings, Rebore Records, Dyspepsidisc, The Great Vitamin Mystery, Duotone Records, Boyarm
- Members: Brett Siler; Aaron Tanner
- Website: Official website

Stationary Odyssey was an American alternative rock band from Evansville, Indiana, United States, composed of Aaron Tanner and Brett Siler. Their debut EP, Komondor, was named one of the top 15 Most Important Releases of 2004 in Japan (Duotone Records).

In December 2006, Stationary Odyssey released a free, downloadable EP that contained a remix by Kramer (Ween, Butthole Surfers).

After touring with Frank Black in early 2007, Mike Farmer (a.k.a. Kentucky Prophet) supplied vocals on two Stationary Odyssey songs for a split EP with Child Bite (Suburban Sprawl Music).

In early 2007, the band had features in both Verbicide magazine and Modern Fix.

Tanner produced a Sonic Youth tribute album, Confuse Yr Idols (Narnack Records). The tribute debuted at No. 44 on the Canadian college charts (Chartattack) and No. 109 on the US college charts (CMJ). It featured a track from Stationary Odyssey as well as Elf Power, Yoshimi P-we of The Boredoms (Saicobab), and Steel Pole Bath Tub.

== Members ==
- Brett Siler - guitar, additional instrumentation
- Aaron Tanner - bass, additional instrumentation

=== Additional contributors ===
- Jeff Acker
- Luke Bickers
- Nathan Brown
- Damon Dawson
- Aaron Distler
- Mike Farmer
- Jesse Gallamore
- Josh Hood
- Shawn Knight
- Mike Langlie
- Dave Melkonian
- Casey Paquet
- Brint Powell
- Kraig Sagan
- Chris Schlarb
- Scott Siler
- Jesse Southerland
- Jackson Tanner
- Aaron Vukovich

== Discography ==
=== LPs ===
- More or Less Is More (2005)
- Komondor LP (2006)
- Head! Foot! And The Pink Axe (2006)
- Sons of Boy (2009)
- Live Voodoo Hex (2010)

=== EPs ===
- Komondor (EP) (2003)
- Perpetual of The Retired Evermore (2004)
- This Is As Good As It Gets (2005)
- Terror On The Hell Loop (2006)
- Physical Education Split EP with Child Bite (2007)
- Johnfriend (2009)

=== Singles ===
- "Demon Oar" b/w "The Everybody" (2012)
- "Spongelike Wonderland" b/w "El Boxeo" (2004)

=== Imports ===
- Perpetual of The Retired Evermore (Japan) (2004)
