= Michael Berryman =

American actor

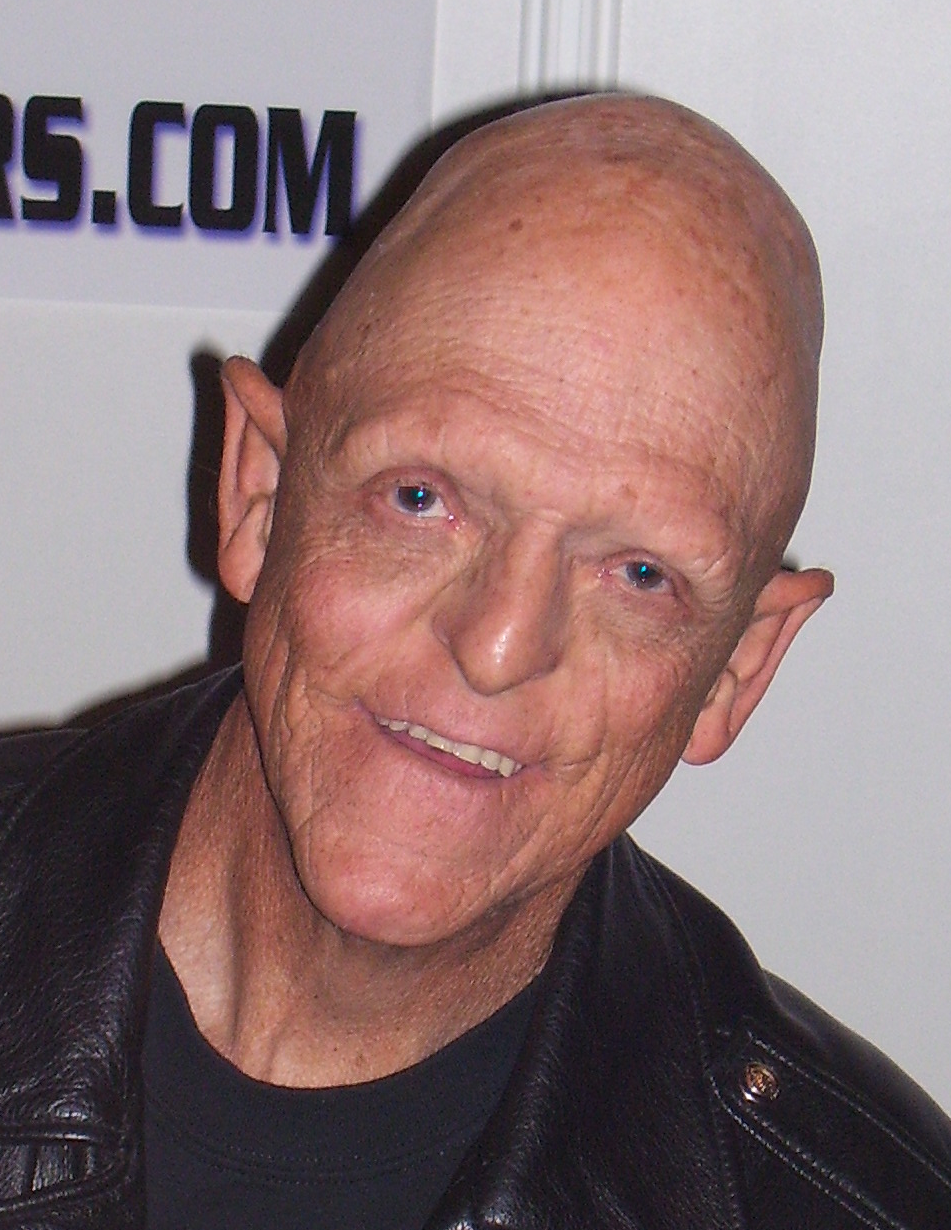
- Berryman in 2007
- Born: Michael John Berryman; September 4, 1948 (age 78); Los Angeles, California, U.S.
- Occupation: Actor
- Years active: 1975–present

Michael John Berryman (born September 4, 1948) is an American character actor. Berryman was born with hypohidrotic ectodermal dysplasia, a rare condition characterized by the absence of sweat glands, hair, and fingernails; his unusual physical appearance has allowed Berryman to make a career out of portraying characters in a number of cult films, horror films and B movies. He first came to prominence for his roles in Miloš Forman's One Flew Over the Cuckoo's Nest (1975) and Wes Craven's The Hills Have Eyes (1977). He has appeared in a wide range of feature films and television series, including Star Trek, The X-Files, and Highway to Heaven, in which he portrayed Satan.

== Early life ==
Michael John Berryman was born September 4, 1948, in Los Angeles, California, the second of two children of Sloan and Barbara Berryman. He has one elder sister, Virginia. Berryman is of partial German descent; his German great-grandfather was a doctor who worked in Vienna. Berryman's mother was a nurse, and his father was a U.S. Navy neurosurgeon who was deployed to the Hiroshima fallout zone in the wake of the atomic bombing.

Berryman was born with hypohidrotic ectodermal dysplasia, a rare genetic condition that affects the development of sweat glands, skin, hair, and fingernails. The condition also led Berryman to develop craniosynostosis, requiring him to undergo cranial reconstructive surgery as a child.

He was raised Roman Catholic and attended Saint Monica Preparatory in Santa Monica. Berryman became an avid surfer from a young age. After completing high school, Berryman attended California Polytechnic State University, San Luis Obispo, where he studied botany and zoology. Prior to becoming an actor, he worked as a florist.

== Career ==
Berryman played Pluto in Wes Craven's 1977 horror film The Hills Have Eyes and the 1985 sequel The Hills Have Eyes Part II. He has also made appearances in the science fiction and fantasy movies My Science Project (1985), Weird Science (1985), Armed Response (1986), Evil Spirits (1990), The Guyver (1991), and Brutal (2007). He appeared in the 1975 Academy Award-winning drama One Flew Over the Cuckoo's Nest. His time on set for The Hills Have Eyes proved difficult for him, since, during the 4-month shoot, temperatures in the desert routinely surpassed 100 degrees Fahrenheit and, without sweat glands, he had to take special precautions to avoid suffering heatstroke.

He had a role in The Crow (1994) as "The Skull Cowboy", Eric Draven's guide to the land of the living. Berryman's scenes were cut from the original theatrical release, but can be found on some DVD releases under "Deleted Scenes".

He has appeared in Star Trek and some episodes of The X-Files. He appeared in the 1985 Mötley Crüe video for "Smokin' In the Boys Room", as well as the introduction to the band's song "Home Sweet Home". He also portrayed the devil in two episodes of Highway to Heaven: "The Devil and Jonathan Smith" (1985) and "I Was a Middle-Aged Werewolf" (1987).

Berryman is a popular draw at genre conventions, such as the 2002 Horrorfind convention in Baltimore, Maryland, and the 2007 Eerie Horror Film Festival in Erie, Pennsylvania. He also appeared in 2001 and 2002 at the Horrorfind convention in Baltimore, Maryland, and in Milwaukee, Wisconsin, on June 7 and 8 attending as a guest of "The Milwaukee County Massacre", a horror film convention and music festival. Berryman appeared at the "Scarefest" convention in Lexington, Kentucky, and at the Spooky Empire convention in Orlando, Florida, on October 17–19, 2008. He appeared in Roseville, Minnesota, at Crypticon 2008 for "A November to Dismember" on November 14–16, 2008 for the show's third year.

Berryman starred in the British-Canadian horror film Below Zero (2012), directed by Justin Thomas Orstensen. He was also a special guest at the third annual San Antonio Horrific Film Fest in August 2010, the Cinema Wasteland convention in April 2011 and the Contamination Convention in Missouri in June 2012. From 2014 to 2018 he played the founder of Zona in Z Nation. In 2024, he starred in a horror film, They Turned Us Into Killers with Taryn Manning, Scout Taylor-Compton and Kane Hodder.

== Personal life ==
Berryman is a strong advocate for environmental protection and lived on a wolf sanctuary for ten years.

== Awards ==
Year	Result	Award	Category/Recipient(s)
1978	Nominated	Saturn Award	Best Actor – Horror for The Hills Filmography
2007	Won	EyeGore Award	Career Contribution in Horror Genre

Year	Title	Role	Notes	Ref.
1975	Doc Savage: The Man of Bronze	Coroner		
1975	One Flew over the Cuckoo's Nest	Ellis		
1977	The Hills Have Eyes	Pluto		
1977	Another Man, Another Chance	First Bandit		
1978	The Fifth Floor	Mental Patient		
1980	Co-Ed			
1981	Deadly Blessing	William Gluntz		
1983	Likely Stories, Vol. 3	Man on television commercial		
1984	Voyage of the Rock Aliens	Chainsaw		
1984	Invitation to Hell	Valet		
1984	The Hills Have Eyes Part II	Pluto		
1985	Weird Science	Mutant Biker		
1985	Cut and Run	Quecho		
1985	My Science Project	Mutant #1		
1986	Armed Response	F.C.		
1986	Star Trek IV: The Voyage Home	Starfleet display officer		
1987	The Barbarians	Dirtmaster		
1987	Off the Mark	Acme Labs Man		
1987	Kenny Rogers as The Gambler, Part III	Cpl. Catlett		
1988	Saturday the 14th Strikes Back	The Mummy		
1989	Star Trek V: The Final Frontier	Sybok Warrior	Uncredited	
1990	Aftershock	Queen		
1990	Solar Crisis	Matthew		
1990	Evil Spirits	Mr. Balzac		
1990	Far Out Man	Angry Biker		
1991	The Guyver	Lisker		
1991	Wizards of the Demon Sword	Highway Man #1		
1991	Beastmaster 2: Through the Portal of Time	Pilgrim #1		
1991	Teenage Exorcist	Herman		
1991	The Secret of the Golden Eagle			
1992	Little Sister	Teacher		
1992	Auntie Lee's Meat Pies	Larry		
1994	The Crow	The Skull Cowboy	Scenes Deleted	
1994	Double Dragon	Maniac Leader		
1996	Spy Hard	Bus Patron with Oxygen Mask		
1996	Mojave Moon	Angel		
1997	Gator King	The Tech		
2000	The Independent	Himself		
2000	Rebel Yell	Bouncer	Uncredited	
2000	Two Heads are Better than None	Chives, the butler		
2005	The Devil's Rejects	Clevon		
2006	The Absence of Light	The Seer		
2006	Penny Dreadful	Gas Station Attendant		
2006	Fallen Angels	Mort		
2007	Ed Gein: The Butcher of Plainfield	Jack		
2007	Dead Man's Hand	Gil Wachetta		
2007	Brutal	Leroy Calhoun		
2009	Brother's War	Col. Petrov		
2009	Smash Cut	Philip Farmsworth Jr.		
2009	Outrage: Born in Terror	Obeah		
2009	Necrosis	Seymour		
2010	The Tenant	Arthur Delman		
2010	Satan Hates You	Mr. Harker		
2010	Scooby-Doo! Curse of the Lake Monster	Zombie Head		
2011	Mask Maker	Fred		
2011	Below Zero	Gunnar		
2011	Beg	Clayton Starks		
2011	The Family	William		
2012	The Lords of Salem	Virgil Magnus		
2012	Watch What You Ask For	The Devil		
2013	Self Storage	Trevor		
2013	Army of the Damned	Crazy Earl		
2013	SuperZero	Raleigh	Short film	
2014	One Please	The Ice Cream Man	Short film	
2014	Apocalypse Kiss	David Horn		
2014	Erebus	Jonah Crane		
2015	Kill or Be Killed	Dr. Pepperdine		
2016	Smothered	Himself		
2016	Potent Media's Sugar Skull Girls	Hobbs		
2016	Cured	The Surgeon	Short film	
2017	The Evil Within	Cadaver		
2017	Death House	Crau		
2018	Hell's Kitty	Detective Pluto		
2018	Impact Event	Raymond		
2018	Violent Starr	The Godmichael		
2019	Shed of the Dead	Derek		
2019	Midnight Devils	Grandpa Forney	Film A.K.A. Midnight Devils	
2019	Cool as Hell 2	The Devil		
2020	The Mad Hatter	Caretaker Robert Lockwood		
2020	It Came Upon a Midnight Clear	Principal Lucas		
2021	Room 9	Jed Bedford		
2021	New York Ninja	Plutonium Killer (voice)	Filmed in 1984, not released until 2021 with dubbed audio	
2024	They Turned Us Into Killers	Jed		
2024	The Family Business	William		
2025	Water Rites	Captain		
2025	Ever After	The Huntsman		

== Television ==
Year	Title	Role	Notes
1985	1st & Ten	Referee	Episode: "Uneasy Lies the Head"
1985-1987	Highway to Heaven	The Devil	2 episodes
1986	The Fall Guy	Biker	Episode: "War on Wheels"
1987	The Highwayman	Chromedrome	Episode: "The Highwayman"
1988	ALF	Lab Man	Episode: "We Are Family"
1988	Star Trek: The Next Generation	Captain Rixx	Episode: "Conspiracy"
1989	Ocean	Apartment Manager	Miniseries
1991	She-Wolf of London	The Creature	Episode: "Bride of the Wolfman"
1991	Tales from the Crypt	Rupert Van Helsing	Episode: "The Reluctant Vampire"
1995	The X-Files	Owen Jarvis	Episode: "Revelations"
1998	Conan the Adventurer	King Penor II	Episode: "Lethal Wizards"
1998	Honey, I Shrunk the Kids: The TV Show	Hook Hand Man	Episode: "Honey, Let's Trick-or-Treat"
2017	Z Nation	The Founder	3 episodes

=== Audio ===
Year	Title	Role	Notes
2025	The Temple of the Killer Tiger Monkeys	Chief Exec	Podcast series

== Bibliography ==
- Berryman, Michael (2023). It's All Good!. Michel Berryman. OCLC 1374627677 – via Amazon Books.
