= Evil Spirits (film) =

- VHS cover
- Directed by: Gary Graver
- Written by: Mikel Angel
- Produced by: Bianca Manzo, Sam Norvell
- Starring: Karen Black; Arte Johnson; Virginia Mayo; Michael Berryman
- Cinematography: Gary Graver
- Edited by: Terry J. Chiappe
- Music by: Duane Sciacqua
- Production company: Grand Am
- Distributed by: Grand Am, Prism Entertainment
- Release date: 1990
- Running time: 95 min
- Country: United States
- Language: English

Evil Spirits is a 1990 American horror film directed by and starring Karen Black, Arte Johnson, Virginia Mayo, and Michael Berryman.

== Plot ==
Domineering and mysterious Ella (Karen Black) keeps a shelter for the homeless, but one day the inhabitants begin to mysteriously disappear. It soon turns out that the loss of people is not the only strange thing happening within the walls of the shelter.

== Cast ==
- Karen Black as Ella Purdy
- Arte Johnson as Lester Potts
- Virginia Mayo as Janet Wilson
- Michael Berryman as Mr. Balzac
- Martine Beswick as Vanya
- Bert Remsen as John Wilson
- Yvette Vickers as Neighbor
- Robert Quarry as Doctor
- Anthony Eisley as Detective
