= Kill Her Goats =

American slasher film

- Promotional release poster
- Directed by: Steve Wolsh
- Written by: Steve Wolsh
- Produced by: Steve Wolsh
- Starring: Arielle Raycene; Ellie Gonsalves; Monica Sims; Dani Mathers; Kane Hodder
- Production company: WithAnO Productions
- Distributed by: Living Dead Media
- Release date: March 2023
- Country: United States
- Language: English

Kill Her Goats is a 2023 American slasher film written, produced and directed by Steve Wolsh. It stars Arielle Raycene, Ellie Gonsalves, Monica Sims, and Dani Mathers, with Kane Hodder as a killer "Goatface".

Kill Her Goats was released on 4K UHD, Blu-ray, and video-on-demand (VOD) in March 2023.

== Cast ==
- Kane Hodder as Goatface
- Arielle Raycene as Audra Bucklebee
- Ellie Gonsalves as Missy Becks
- Dani Mathers as Haley Bucklebee—Saint
- Monica Sims as Reese Knox
- Amberleigh West as Autumn Applebaum

== Production ==
Kill Her Goats was shot on location on Cape Cod in Massachusetts. Filming took place in October 2015. Ben Bornstein provided practical creature and gore effects for the film.

== Release ==
Kill Her Goats was released on 4K UHD and Blu-ray as a "limited edition" SteelBook set, which was estimated to ship on March 1, 2023. Additional merchandise, including a soundtrack album and a Christmas ornament, were released.
