= Shed of the Dead =

- Theatrical release poster
- Directed by: Drew Cullingham
- Written by: Drew Cullingham
- Produced by: Nicholas David Lean; James Fisher
- Starring: Kane Hodder; Michael Berryman; Bill Moseley
- Narrated by: Brian Blessed
- Cinematography: Stephen Murphy
- Edited by: Stephen Hedley
- Music by: Reinhard Besser
- Distributed by: Smart Dog Productions; Indican Pictures
- Release date: 17 May 2019
- Country: United Kingdom
- Language: English

Shed of the Dead is a 2019 British comedy horror film directed by Drew Cullingham and produced by Nicholas David Lean & James Fisher. The movie has been described as "Shaun of the Dead for the post-Walking Dead generation".

== Plot ==
Trevor is between jobs, and spends his days in the company of equally unemployable friend Graham painting figurines and war gaming fantasy worlds in his allotment shed. After he accidentally kills one of his neighbours, when they try to have him evicted from his plot, the dead begin to rise forcing Trevor to make a life changing decision. Whether to rescue his wife, as the adopted alter ego of his fantasies, Casimir, or leave her to an uncertain fate.

== Cast ==
- Spencer Brown as Trevor
- Kane Hodder as Mr Parsons
- Michael Berryman as Derek
- Bill Moseley as Doc
- Brian Blessed as Narrator
- Ewen MacIntosh as Graham
- Lauren Socha as Bobbi
- Emily Booth as Harriet

== Production ==
Director Drew Cullingham first discussed ideas for the film during a visit to a pub with Nick Lean and producing partner James Fisher.

The film was first announced in March 2015, with the director and cast being announced and the first poster being released.

Filming began in October 2015 in the UK. Filming occurred in Bexleyheath & Sidcup and Leytonstone.

== Release ==
Shed Of The Dead had a limited theatrical release following its premiere at Laemmie Theatre in North Hollywood on May 17th, 2019. It screened at the Sci-Fi London Film Festival on May 18th, 2019 and released digitally on May 20th, 2019.

== Reception ==
=== Critical Response ===
Shed of the Dead received generally mixed reviews. One reviewer wrote "it's clear that this isn't exactly a movie that thrives on originality. It is, however, a charming exercise in shlock and silliness, even if it’s not the most memorable horror outing ever", while another said "There are little hints of a better film here trying to get out but too many scenes start promisingly only to end up contributing nothing to the overall work".

Writing for the Los Angeles Times, Noel Murray critiqued the film for its portrayal of women, noting "[Shed of the Dead] suffers from some ugly misogyny, with nearly every woman in the picture framed as a sex object or shrew. The openhearted humanism of Edgar Wright and Simon Pegg is much missed".

== See also ==
- Shaun of the Dead
- Three Flavours Cornetto
