= To Your Last Death =

- Directed by: Jason Axinn
- Written by: Jim Cirile; Tanya C. Klein
- Produced by: Jim Cirile; Tanya C. Klein; Cindi Rice; Jason Axinn; Paige Barnett; Lawrence Lee Wallace; Brian Confer; Nick Ford; Bill Gammon; Philip Landa; Ed Murphy; Nefertiti Thomas
- Starring: Morena Baccarin; Ray Wise; Bill Moseley; William Shatner
- Edited by: Jason Axinn
- Music by: René G. Boscio
- Production company: Quirk Pictures
- Distributed by: Coverage, Ink Films
- Release dates: August 23, 2019 (FrightFest); March 17, 2020
- Running time: 91 minutes
- Country: United States
- Language: English

To Your Last Death is a 2019 American 2D adult animated action horror film produced and directed by Jason Axinn, and written by Jim Cirile and Tanya C. Klein. It stars the voices of Morena Baccarin, Ray Wise, Bill Moseley and William Shatner.

== Plot ==
Sole survivor of a brutal attack that destroyed her brothers and sister, Miriam Dekalb is given a chance to re-live that night from the beginning, armed with foreknowledge of the events. Of course, there's always the chance that Miriam is insane and murdered everyone herself.

== Cast ==
- William Shatner as The Overseer
- Morena Baccarin as Gamemaster
- Ray Wise as Cyrus DeKalb
- Bill Moseley as Pavel
- Dani Lennon as Miriam DeKalb
- Florence Hartigan as Kelsy DeKalb
- Damien Haas as Ethan DeKalb
- Ben Siemon as Colin DeKalb
- Mark Whitten as Walt, Razor Sharp

== Production ==
=== Development ===
Under its working title, Malevolent, the film was 114% funded on Indiegogo on March 18, 2016, with the total amount raised being $52,713. The film then entered production.

=== Process ===
The film took five years to complete, and finished in late 2017. Post-production was completed in late 2018.

William Shatner was confirmed to have joined the cast on October 14, 2015.

== Release ==
To Your Last Death premiered on August 23, 2019 at the London FrightFest Film Festival, and was released online via Amazon Prime Video, iTunes and VUDU in the United States on March 17, 2020. The film received a Blu-ray release on October 6, 2020.

It was screened online in the United Kingdom on May 29, 2021, as part of Grimmfest's May Madness Event.

== Reception ==
=== Accolades ===
Ceremony	Year	Category	Nominee	Result	Ref.
Crimson Screen Horror Film Fest	2020	Jury Award	To Your Last Death	Won	
Pasadena International Film Festival	2020	Best Feature Film	To Your Last Death	Won	
Film Threat / Award This!	2021	Best WTF? Movie	To Your Last Death	Won	

== Future ==
A sequel is in development, set in the same universe. It may be animated or live-action.
