= Exit 33 =

- DVD released by Vicious Circle Films
- Directed by: Tommy Brunswick
- Written by: Mark Myers; Norman Koza
- Screenplay by: Mark Myers; Norman Koza
- Story by: Norman Koza
- Produced by: Raymond Koza; Todd Brunswick; Tommy Brunswick
- Starring: Tim Cole; Paul Elia; Jerry Reid; John Anton; Lon Tedder; Kane Hodder; April Canning; Maria Hildreth; Christian Koza; Antoinette Kalaj
- Cinematography: Michael Kudreiko
- Edited by: Chris Rosik; Doug Kolbicz; Todd Brunswick
- Music by: Bill Alton; Daniel D. Smith
- Production companies: Norman Koza Productions; Atomic Devil Entertainment
- Distributed by: Vicious Circle Films
- Release date: August 2, 2011 (United States)
- Running time: 89 minutes
- Country: United States
- Language: English
- Budget: $1,000,000

Exit 33 is a 2011 horror film directed by Tommy Brunswick, and written by Mark Myers and Norman Koza.

== Plot ==
While drunk and out hunting one day, Ike accidentally shot his pregnant wife in the eye, and since then he has been coerced by hallucinations or ghosts of his wife and unborn son into atoning for the act by acquiring replacement eyes. Whenever a woman he finds suitable stops at his gas station on Exit 33, Ike has them use a sabotaged pump that causes their vehicle to break down a short distance away. Ike then drives up, kills anyone with the woman, knocks her out and takes her back to the gas station, where he gouges out their eyes, and makes jerky out of their body. Ike preserves the eyes, and places them in one of the mounted hunting trophies in his den.

While on their way to their fifth high school reunion, Angie and Eve (whose boyfriend is beheaded with a hacksaw) are captured by Ike, who removes both of Eve's eyes and lets her exsanguinate. Every time a possible savior (such as Angie's boyfriend Matt, a pair of hunters, and an off-duty police officer) stops by, they are killed by Ike, who loses an eye himself during a fight with Matt. Angie's eyes are inevitably removed, and Ike places them in one of his hunting trophies. While relaxing in his den, Ike tells his imaginary son that he hopes next hunting season will be just as fruitful as this one.

== Cast ==
- Sonya Warrick as Girl
- Kane Hodder as Ike
- Antoinette Kalaj as Angie
- Jerry Reid as Matt
- Maria Hildreth as Eva
- Kostadin Mihajlovski as Manager
- Paul Elia as Dax
- April Canning as Marla
- Virginia Bryant as Ike's Wife
- Eddie Koza as Customer #1
- Julian Jeberaeel as Customer #2
- Christian Koza as Ike's Son
- Tim Cole as Law Man
- Josh Tobias as Bus Driver
- John Anton as Joe
- Lon Tedder as Randy

== Reception ==
About.com gave Exit 33 a one out of five, calling it "cliché-ridden torture porn drivel" that suffered from repetitiveness, poor acting and flat characters. Mark L. Miller writing for Aint It Cool News said of the film "The acting is pretty amateur. The budget is low. The production is too." but ultimately recommended checking it out simply for Kane Hodder. JoBlo.com panned the film saying "The only thing this flick has going for it is that it stars Kane Hodder--and the guy really can't act. EXIT 33 feels like a student film with low-rate acting, cinematography, and special effects."
