= Who Was in My Room Last Night? =

Single by Butthole Surfers

from the album Independent Worm Saloon
- Released: 1993
- Genre: Hard rock; grunge
- Length: 4:09
- Label: Capitol
- Songwriters: Gibby Haynes, Paul Leary, King Coffey, Jeff Pinkus
- Producers: John Paul Jones, Butthole Surfers

"Who Was in My Room Last Night?" is the opening track from American rock band Butthole Surfers' sixth album, Independent Worm Saloon. A remixed version, known as the "Tate or Tot Mix", was released on the CD magazine Volume Eight.

== Music video ==
The music video was directed by William Stobaugh, and animated by Tom Holleran and Wesley Meyer Archer. The video depicts a man with a large black pompadour (each played by a member of Butthole Surfers) who drives to a bar where the band are performing the song. He orders a drink from the bartender (played by Flea of the Red Hot Chili Peppers) and, upon consuming it, experiences some bizarre hallucinations, mostly involving the bar's waitress (played by Therese Kablan), who is depicted as the man's girlfriend, a nurse, and a series of creatures, before he apparently gets into a car crash and is last seen falling down a void of cartoon skulls.

Many of the hallucinatory images are taken from the works of artist Robert Williams.

The video was shown in the Beavis and Butt-head episode "No Laughing", and was received very enthusiastically by the duo.

== In other media ==
A censored version of the song was used in a commercial for Nintendo's Play It Loud! campaign.

A cover version of this song was featured in the 2006 video game Guitar Hero II.

Black Tusk, Child Bite, and actor Bill Moseley collaborated on a cover version of the song. It was released as a music video in 2021.
