= Ed Gein: The Butcher of Plainfield =

- DVD released by Barnholtz Entertainment and Lions Gate Films Home Entertainment
- Directed by: Michael Feifer
- Written by: Michael Feifer
- Produced by: Michael Feifer
- Starring: Kane Hodder; Adrienne Frantz; Priscilla Barnes; Michael Berryman
- Cinematography: Roberto Schein
- Edited by: Bryan Roberts
- Music by: Glenn Morrissette
- Production companies: Feifer Worldwide; North American Entertainment
- Distributed by: Barnholtz Entertainment; Lions Gate Films Home Entertainment
- Release date: March 6, 2007 (United States)
- Running time: 90 minutes
- Country: United States
- Language: English

Ed Gein: The Butcher of Plainfield is a 2007 American crime horror film written and directed by Michael Feifer. A direct-to-video release, it is based on the crimes of Ed Gein, an American murderer who killed at least two women in Plainfield, Wisconsin, during the 1950s. It stars Kane Hodder as Gein, and co-stars Adrienne Frantz, Priscilla Barnes, and Michael Berryman.

== Plot ==
Ed Gein is a socially awkward farmer who lives alone on the outskirts of Plainfield, Wisconsin. Ed, despondent over the recent death of his overbearing mother, has begun digging up and "borrowing" the bodies of women who remind him of her with the reluctant help of his only friend, Jack. In 1957, Ed suffers a psychotic break and becomes a spree killer, murdering a stranded motorist named Becky, Jack, and a graveyard security guard before abducting a bartender named Sue Layton. Ed butchers Sue in his barn and uses her flesh to construct a "woman suit" before kidnapping another woman, a hardware store owner named Vera Mason.

Vera's son, Deputy Bobby Mason, is away in another county with his girlfriend, Erica, when he receives word of Vera's disappearance. While rushing back to Plainfield, Bobby crashes his car, and when he goes off in search of aid, the wounded Erica is taken by Ed. Bobby regroups with the rest of the Plainfield police force shortly after a witness comes forward to report seeing what looked like a woman's feet dangling from the back of Ed's truck. The police search Ed's home, and find what is left of Sue and Vera. Bobby vows to kill Ed, who has run off with Erica.

In the woods, Erica tries to appeal to Ed's humanity, asking if he has any compassion, with Ed dourly answering that his compassion died with his parents and brother before expressing the nihilistic beliefs that life is worthless because it inevitably ends and that "we're all just flesh." Bobby saves Erica from Ed, who he contemplates killing, only to be talked out of it by the sheriff and Erica. An intertitle then states that Ed was charged with two of the ten murders that he was accused of, but was found unfit to stand trial and spent the rest of his life in a mental institution, where he died of cancer in 1984.

== Cast ==
- Kane Hodder as Ed Gein
- Adrienne Frantz as Erica
- Michael Berryman as Jack
- Priscilla Barnes as Vera Mason
- Shawn Hoffman as Deputy Bobby Mason
- Timothy Oman as Sheriff
- Caia Coley as Sue Layton
- John Burke as Rick Layton
- Matteo Indelicato as Deputy Coley
- Stan Bly as Deputy Lyle
- Deborah Flora as Sylvia Anguerson
- Kendal Sheppard as Becky
- Mike Korich as Avary
- Jay Wilkins as Graveyard Security Guard
- Sean Stanek as Federal Employee
- Samm Enman as Woman in Road
- Kevin Linell as Man in Road
- Torre Valencia as Girl in Store
- Glenn Valencia as Father in Store
- Amy Lyndon as Mrs. Gein
- Paige Rowland as Lee Ann
- Corbin Timbrook as Billy Joe
- Coley Feifer as Little Ed Gein
- Reed Hodder as Reid
- Mark R. Brown as Mr. Divecchio

== Production ==
Michael Feifer wrote the film's script in three days and shot the film in ten days on sets that were previously used in the 2005 Rob Zombie film The Devil's Rejects. When it came to casting Kane Hodder as Ed Gein, Feifer reportedly stated, "Kane was really excited about the part, because it's the first time he's had the opportunity to really show what he can do without the [Jason] mask." The film's special effects, such as the dummy that was used for Michael Berryman's character's death scene, were provided by Tom Devlin of 1313FX.

== Release ==
Ed Gein: The Butcher of Plainfield was announced for release on March 6, 2007. Clips of it appeared online, on editor Bryan Roberts's official website, on November 25, 2006. The film's first official stills were released on December 29, 2006. The film's final box art, special features, and technical specs were unveiled on January 31, 2007. It was released direct-to-video in the United States on March 6, 2006 by Lionsgate. The international release rights were secured by American Cinema International, which shopped the picture around the 2007 Cannes Film Festival.

The film was made available on the streaming service Tubi in March 2017.

== Reception ==
Ryan Doom of Arrow in the Head gave the film a score of 2/4 and wrote, "Ed Gein: The Butcher of Plainfield is one of those films that a viewer can take two ways. Implausibly bad. Or fantastically bad. It all depends on perspective. With routinely mediocre acting, painful dialogue, and uninteresting, sometimes forced characters, the film possesses so many clichés that things get downright laughable. It's just a matter of taste."

While critical of how little Kane Hodder resembled the real-life Ed Gein and how fast and loose the film was with the facts of the Gein case, Steve Barton of Dread Central still praised Hodder's performance, gave the film a score of 2½ out of 5, and wrote, "If you're a Hodder fan, you really should check this out. Sadly, this flick works much better as a fictional horror film than an actual account. I almost wish it were called something else entirely." Michael Gingold of Fangoria found the casting of Hodder as Gein awkward, and felt that the film did little to differentiate itself from previous works about or inspired by Gein, such as Deranged and In the Light of the Moon.

In a review written for MovieWeb, Evan Jacobs offered mild praise to Hodder's acting and the film's black comedy, but further opined that it failed to impress "on nearly every level" and was "painfully" slow, ultimately concluding, "All in all, yet another serial killer biopic from Lions Gate goes off without doing anything special, but at least this time it managed not to spend the whole movie drooling on itself either. A thoroughly bland but marginally acceptable romp, if you're devoted to seeing real-life killers, then you might at least get a good rental out of Ed Gein: The Butcher of Plainfield."

== See also ==
- Deranged, a 1974 film based on Ed Gein
- In the Light of the Moon, a 2000 film based on Ed Gein
