= Old 37 =

- Film poster
- Directed by: Christian Winters (Note: Credited as Alan Smithee.)
- Written by: Joe Landes; Paul Travers
- Starring: Kane Hodder; Bill Moseley; Brandi Cyrus
- Release date: March 21, 2015 (HorrorHound)
- Running time: 84 minutes
- Country: United States
- Language: English

Old 37 is a 2015 American horror film written by Joe Landes and Paul Travers, directed by Christian Winters (under the Alan Smithee pseudonym) and starring Kane Hodder, Bill Moseley and Brandi Cyrus.

== Plot ==
1977: Two boys are living in a decrepit junkyard with their father, Jimmy, who has a hobby of listening to a police radio for nearby car accidents. Hearing of an injured female motorist, he forces the boys into his stolen ambulance and reports to the scene of the crash, posing as a paramedic. He strangles the woman then relishes in her open wounds as the boys watch from the ambulance. News reports reveal more than 30 motorist disappearances in the Pine Barrens area along Ash Pine Road over the span of 20 years.

Present Day: Samantha and her boyfriend Jordan are making out while driving down Ash Pine Rd and Jordan loses control and wrecks. Samantha calls 911 and soon ambulance 37 arrives; the couple is dispatched by the brothers, Darryl and Jon Roy, who are now grown and using their father's modus operandi.

Amy, a teenager ostracized by her classmates for her breast size, recently lost her firefighter father and is troubled by her mother Mary's newly active dating life. Amy has also recently experienced a rift in her longtime friendship with another high school outcast, Angel, due to Angel's new boyfriend Brad. While Angel is with Brad and his friends, Tim, Jason, his girlfriend Brooke and her friend Rachel, she attempts to stand on both Jason and Brad's cars as they drive parallel down Ash Pine Rd. Brooke, having just pulled off the stunt herself, is annoyed Angel is now trying it and intentionally distracts Jason, causing Angel to fall to the road, killing her. When the police arrive, they lie and say that it was an accident and solely fault Angel.

After Angel's funeral, Jordan is reported missing, which causes the police investigation surrounding Angel's death to intensify and the lead investigator, Officer Higgins, questions Amy regarding Angel's new group of friends. Amy later asks her mother for a breast augmentation, which Mary reluctantly agrees to. They see a doctor and her surgery is scheduled. Brooke and Jason have arguments and Jason begins talking with Amy online and asks her to come with him to a party at Brooke's. At the party, Brooke jealously reveals to Amy that she, Jason, Samantha and Jordan were previously responsible the death of an old woman in an unreported hit and run along Ash Pine Rd.

Brad and Rachel leave the party together and unintentionally park outside Jimmy's Junkyard on Ash Pine Rd. While they are making out, Darryl and Jon Roy attack and kill them, taking the bodies inside the junkyard. Tim, who left the party to look for Brad, arrives at Brad's car and follows the blood trail into the junkyard. Inside, he recognizes Jordan's car and finds Brad and Rachel's bodies in the trunk. Jon Roy appears behind him and smashes his head with the trunk and stashes his body inside. Later, Officer Higgins responds to a report of an abandoned car outside the junkyard and inspects the property but narrowly misses the bodies.

After fighting with Jason at the party, Brooke drives along Ash Pine Rd but she is driven off the road. A motorist reports the accident and Jon Roy and Darryl respond. They take Brooke back to the junkyard where they tie her down and Darryl pours liquid lye on her, then lights her on fire. Meanwhile, Amy has her breast augmentation surgery.

Some time passes and Jason and Amy are now a couple. One night while on a date, they are stalked and lured to ambulance 37 by Jon Roy and Darryl, who abduct them and take them to the junkyard. Jason attempts to fight Jon Roy but is overpowered while Darryl terrorizes Amy, chasing her around the yard and stabbing her in her breast implant. Amy finds her mother's body strung up in a mock crucifixion in the middle of the junkyard before stumbling into the trailer the brothers live in. Inside, she finds their mother, preserved in a display case as well as a lobotomized Jimmy, and she hides. It is revealed through flashbacks that Darryl and Jon Roy's mother was the old woman killed by Jason and Jordan.

Officer Higgins arrives at the junkyard, suspicious of Darryl, and hears the screams from inside. He enters and finds Brooke, barely alive but is soon killed by Darryl. Darryl and Jon Roy both corner Amy and Darryl is about to kill her when Jon Roy is reminded of a time in his childhood when Darryl disfigured him and he turns on his brother, killing him before he can kill Amy, which allows her to escape. Amy wanders down Ash Pine Rd where she is nearly struck by an oncoming police car, but Jason saves her. The officer stops and checks to see if they are all right when ambulance 37 turns the corner at high speed, driven by Jon Roy, and crashes into Jason, Amy and the officer.

== Cast ==
- Kane Hodder as Jon Roy
- Bill Moseley as Darryl
- Caitlin Harris as Amy
- Olivia Alexander as Brooke
- Brandi Cyrus as Angel
- Sascha Knopf as Mary
- Maxwell Zagorski as Jason
- Maggie Keane Williams as Rachel
- Ben Schneider as Tim
- Devon Spence as Brad
- Robert Bogue as Officer Higgins
- Jake Robinson as Jordan
- Catherine Blades as Samantha
- Susan McBrien as Martha
- Mindy White
- Ken Simmons as Jimmy
- Lloyd Kaufman (uncredited cameo)

== Production ==
Early in development, Paul Travers was going to direct the film.

== Release ==
The film made its worldwide premiere on March 21, 2015, at the HorrorHound Film Festival in Cincinnati, Ohio. It was later released on DVD and Blu Ray in Canada on October 6, 2015.
