= The Possessed (2021 film) =

- Film poster
- Directed by: Chris Sun
- Written by: Chris Sun
- Produced by: Danny Baldwin; Sue Baldwin; Mitchell Clough; Christine Hulsby; Chris Sun
- Starring: John Jarratt; Lincoln Lewis; Angie Kent; Lauren Grimson; Jade Kevin Foster; Romy Poulier; Sean Lynch
- Cinematography: Andrew Conder
- Edited by: Michael Gilbert
- Music by: Mark Smythe
- Production company: Pinnacle Studios
- Distributed by: Slaughter FX
- Release date: October 29, 2021 (FrightFest)
- Running time: 97 minutes
- Country: Australia
- Language: English

The Possessed is a 2021 Australian horror film written and directed by Chris Sun and starring John Jarratt, Lincoln Lewis and Angie Kent. The film premiered at the 2021 London FrightFest Film Festival and was scheduled to be released in Australia in November 2021.

== Plot ==
The film follows exorcists Jacob Chandler and his nephew Liam (Lincoln Lewis), who notice that demonic possessions appear to be on the rise.

== Cast ==
- John Jarratt as Jacob Chandler
- Lincoln Lewis as Liam Chandler
- Angie Kent as Nadine
- Lauren Grimson as Atalie Carlisle
- Jade Kevin Foster as Orion
- Romy Poulier
- Sean Lynch as Martin
- Simone Buchanan as Carissa
- Melissa Bell as Helen
- Melissa Tkautz as Shania

== Production ==
The Possessed was filmed in Queensland.
