= Adrienne Frantz =

American actress and singer-songwriter

- Born: Adrienne Danielle Frantz; June 7, 1978 (age 47); Mount Clemens, Michigan, U.S.
- Years active: 1997–present
- Notable work: Ambrosia "Amber" Moore in The Bold and the Beautiful and The Young and the Restless
- Spouse: Scott Bailey (m. 2011)
- Children: 3

Adrienne Danielle Frantz (born June 7, 1978) is an American actress and singer-songwriter. She appeared as Amber Moore in The Bold and the Beautiful (1997–2005, 2010–2012) and The Young and the Restless (2006–2010, 2013).

== Career ==
Frantz was born in Mount Clemens, Michigan to Vicki and John Frantz. She first broke into the soap opera genre in 1997 as Tiffany Thorne on Sunset Beach. Frantz left the show later that year for her role as the villainess turned sympathetic heroine Amber on The Bold and the Beautiful. In 2001, her portrayal garnered Frantz a Daytime Emmy in the Outstanding Younger Actress category. Frantz played the role on B&B until 2005, when she left to focus on a music career. From November 2006 to May 2010, she played Amber on The Young and the Restless. July 1, 2010, marked Frantz's return to The Bold and the Beautiful as Amber, where she remained until 2012. Frantz made a one-episode appearance on The Young and the Restless in September 2013.

Outside of B&B, Frantz made a guest appearance as a Teen idol named Emica in the 2001 Rugrats episode, "All Growed Up", which later was the basis for the spinoff All Grown Up!. She played Claire Redfield in a commercial for Resident Evil 2, directed by George A. Romero, shown only in Japan. Frantz guest starred in an episode of That '70s Show, playing Fez's girlfriend Kelly. Frantz later appeared in Ed Gein: The Butcher of Plainfield. In 2005, Frantz was cast in the horror film Hack!, which was released in 2007.

== Personal life ==
In January 2010, Frantz was engaged to actor Scott Bailey. Bailey and she married in California on November 11, 2011. In 2014, Frantz was bitten in the face by a dog while filming The Perfect Girlfriend in Ottawa. She sued for $5 million in damages, but Ontario's Workplace Safety Tribunal ruled she was covered by workers' compensation, barring the lawsuit. After nine years, the case was dismissed, and she was ordered to pay $62,000 in legal costs. In June 2015, Frantz announced that she was pregnant and gave birth to a girl, Amélie on December 1, 2015. In March 2020, Frantz announced that she was pregnant once again and gave birth to a boy, Lion on June 19, 2020. In November 2021, Frantz announced that she was pregnant once again and gave birth to a boy, Killian in March 2022.

== Filmography ==
Film roles
Year	Title	Role	Notes
1999	Jimmy Zip	Sheila	
1999	Speedway Junky	Kelley	
2007	Ed Gein: The Butcher of Plainfield	Erica	
2007	Hack!	Maddy	
2009	Donna on Demand	Donna	
2011	Act Your Age	E.B.	
2015	Steve's Big Date	Waitress	

Television roles
Year	Title	Role	Notes
1997	Sunset Beach	Tiffany Thorne	48 episodes
1999	Chicken Soup for the Soul	Sandy	Episode: "Egg Lessons"
1997–2005, 2010–2012	The Bold and the Beautiful	Amber Moore / April Knight	1236 episodes
2000	The Wild Thornberrys	Inga	Episode: "Every Little Bit Alps"
2000	As Told by Ginger	Operator's Voice / Computer Voice	3 episodes
2001	Wheel Of Fortune	Herself	Episode: Soap City Week 2001 Day 3
2001	Rugrats	Emica	Episode: "All Growed Up Part 2"
2002	Six Feet Under	Soap Actress	Uncredited Episode: "The Liar and the Whore"
2006	That '70s Show	Kelly	Episode: "We Will Rock You"
2006–2010, 2013	The Young and the Restless	Amber Moore	400 episodes
2012	I Married Who?	Claire	Television film
2013	A-Holes Anonymous	Crystal Cleary	3 episodes
2014	Justified	Candace	Episode: "Raw Deal"
2015	The Perfect Girlfriend	Simone Matthews	Television film
2019	Maternal Instinct	Kelly	Television film
2021	Days of Our Lives: Beyond Salem	Sophie Faversham	Episode: "Dressed to Kill"

== Discography ==
- 2007 : Anomaly
