= Boar (film) =

- Theatrical release poster
- Directed by: Chris Sun
- Written by: Kristy Dallas; Chris Sun
- Produced by: Kris Maric; Christine Hulsby; Chris Sun
- Starring: Nathan Jones; John Jarratt; Melissa Tkautz; Bill Moseley
- Cinematography: Andrew Conder
- Edited by: Michael Gilbert
- Music by: Mark Smythe
- Production companies: Slaughter FX; OZPIX Entertainment
- Distributed by: Universal Pictures
- Release dates: 23 November 2017 (Monster Fest); 10 February 2018
- Running time: 96 minutes
- Country: Australia
- Language: English

Boar is a 2017 Australian horror film written and directed by Chris Sun about a young family that find themselves in the Australian countryside, being hunted by a giant, bloodthirsty wild boar. The film stars Nathan Jones, John Jarratt, Christie-Lee Britten, and Melissa Tkautz, with special appearances by Chris Haywood and Steve Bisley.

== Plot ==
A couple is driving along a road in the Outback of Australia when they stop after nearly hitting a rabbit. As they recover from the shock, they notice a feral pig stampede before a massive man-eating boar as big as a rhinoceros slams into their truck, killing them.

Later, a family consisting of father Bruce, his wife Debbie, their son Bart and daughter Ella, are taking a road trip with Ella's boyfriend Robert to see their uncle, Bernie, who owns a farm just outside the town. Later that night, a nearby farmer goes looking for his missing dog and stumbles upon the giant boar, which kills and eats both him and the dog after breaking through their barbed-wire fence. The following night, the boar also attacks and kills campers Ryan and his lover Hanna, viciously mauling the latter. Ken, father to the local pub owner, Sasha, is out camping with his friend Blue when he sees the boar raiding the camp, after which they find the mutilated remains of the two campers upon scaring it off with a gunshot. When Ken sends Blue back to their truck for more ammunition upon finding they're out of bullets, the boar ambushes Blue and kills him. As Ken searches for the other two campers, Matt and Sherry, the boar attacks them, leaving Sherry brutally gored and killing Matt. After finding Sherry, Ken lures the boar away, only to find Sherry dead from her wounds, and the boar returns to kill him as well.

Later, when Bernie takes his family out for a day of fun, he briefly leaves to search for Ken and Blue, only to have his truck attacked by the boar. Though injured, he survives and loads a rifle to go after the pig and protect his family. Sasha goes out to look for her father. As Robert and Bruce go looking for Bernie after hearing his car crash, they encounter the boar, which kills Bruce after Robert leaves him for dead. Arriving too late to save Bruce, Bernie manages to shoot the boar, enraging it. As Ella, Bart and Debbie reunite with Robert, he is killed by the wounded boar, which steals him from right in front of them. As Bernie returns to rescue them, he tries to lead Ella, Bart and Debbie to safety, only for night to fall and Bernie to lose his gun. The boar then attacks Bart when he trips and falls, dragging him away. After making it to a nearby shed, the remaining family members grieve, after which Bernie says that the only way to stop the pig is to kill it. Before they can make a plan, the boar attacks, with Bernie fighting it to allow Ella and Debbie to escape. Though he wounds the boar, it still defeats him by trampling over him before going after Ella and Debbie. By this point, the two women have constructed multiple fires to try and keep it away, but the boar attacks as they try to fend it off with their torches, managing to savage Ella's leg. The boar's attack is halted when Sasha comes to their rescue, hitting the pig with her truck, gravely wounding it. As the mutilated boar tries to attack again, Debbie shoots it to death with Sasha's shotgun, ending its reign of terror once and for all. As they begin to drive away, the three women find Bernie and Bart, alive but badly wounded. As the five drive away to safety, another giant boar appears as the camera fades, letting out a defiant squeal...

== Cast ==
- Nathan Jones as Bernie
- John Jarratt as Ken
- Christie-Lee Britten as Ella
- Melissa Tkautz as Sasha
- Ernie Dingo as Ernie
- Roger Ward as Blue
- Hugh Sheridan as Robert
- Bill Moseley as Bruce
- Chris Haywood as Jack
- Ricci Guarnaccio as Oscar
- Madeleine Kennedy as Hanna
- Griffin Walsh as Bart
- Simone Buchanan as Debbie

== Release ==
=== Home media ===
The film was released on DVD by Image on 3 December 2019.

=== Critical response ===
Boar received mixed reviews from critics upon its release. Anton Bitel from SciFi Now criticized the film for its uninteresting characters, derivative plot, and repetitive revealing of the title monster. Bitel concluded his review by writing," For while Boar plainly advertises the big beast to come, it also hints homophonously at an absence of sufficient entertainment to see us through its duration." Niall Browne from Movies in Focus gave the film one out of five stars, criticizing the film's performances, "flat" humor, and plot. However, Browne commended the film's practical effects, while stating that the use of CGI effects during the film's finale was poor and unconvincing.

The film wasn't without its supporters. Jonathan Barkan from Dread Central awarded the film three and a half out of five stars, writing, "Hindered by strange pacing and restrained by the limitations of a giant practical pig, Boar still manages to be a thoroughly entertaining and wildly savage bloodbath through the beauty of the Australian bush." Jeremy Aspinall of The Radio Times gave the film three out of five stars, stating that while the film lacked originality, its performances, and withholding of its titular antagonist until the finale was commendable.

=== Accolades ===
The film was nominated for Best Creature FX at the 2020 Fangoria Chainsaw Awards.

== See also ==
- Razorback
