= Hack! =

- Hack! theatrical poster
- Directed by: Matt Flynn
- Written by: Matt Flynn
- Produced by: Brian Hartman; Sean Kanan; Mike Wittlin
- Starring: Danica McKellar; Jay Kenneth Johnson; William Forsythe; Sean Kanan; Juliet Landau; Justin Chon
- Cinematography: Roger Chingirian
- Edited by: Kyle Dean Jackson
- Music by: Scott Glasgow
- Distributed by: Allumination FilmWorks
- Release dates: July 20, 2007 (United Kingdom); December 11, 2007 (United States)
- Running time: 89 minutes
- Country: United States
- Language: English

Hack! is a 2007 American horror film directed and written by Matt Flynn and produced by Mike Wittlin Productions. The film centres on a group of students who, while on a field trip, become victims in a snuff film, and stars Danica McKellar, Jay Kenneth Johnson, William Forsythe, Sean Kanan, Juliet Landau, Justin Chon, Travis Schuldt, Adrienne Frantz and Gabrielle Richens. The film was released in the UK on July 20, 2007, before receiving a US release on December 11, 2007.

== Plot ==
On a small island, a man is chased and decapitated by his pursuer. Meanwhile, a group of teenage college students, named Emily, Johnny, Ricky, Tim, Maddy, Q and Sylvia, are chosen to go on a field trip to the island. The group, along with their teacher Mr. Argento, meet Captain J.T. Bates who takes them to the island on his boat. There, the group meet Vincent King and Mary Shelley a couple with whom they will be staying. Mary begins to film the group on her hand-held recorder, saying that she is an aspiring director.

At night, while the group settle in and have dinner with Vincent and Mary, Mr. Carl Villanueva finds that he has to leave the island to retrieve some equipment. However, arriving at the boat, Argento finds J.T. murdered. Meanwhile, the students have a bonfire on the beach. Q leaves the group only to be startled by a figure dressed up as a clown. After telling the others about the incident, he is ignored and everyone goes to bed, not knowing that Argento has also been murdered.

The following day, Sheriff Stoker arrives on the island in search of a missing hunter. He questions Vincent and Mary, who deny ever seeing him, so the Sheriff leaves. Tim and Sylvia later sneak into the forest to have sex but are quickly attacked by the killer, who murders Tim with a chainsaw. Sylvia is caught and locked in a cage in an underground dungeon. At dinner, Emily becomes concerned with the various disappearances before realising that the phone lines are down. Vincent and Mary convince everyone that there is nothing to worry about. The students have another bonfire on the beach. While searching for a phone signal, Q encounters the clown again, who crushes his neck and kills him. With Q now also missing, Emily, Johnny, Ricky, and Maddy enter the forest to find their fellow students. Meanwhile, Vincent and Mary watch videos of murders they have committed and filmed. The couple are making a snuff film.

Stoker, having become suspicious about Vincent and Mary, returns to the island, but is murdered by them with an axe. While searchung the forest with Ricky, Maddy is knocked unconscious by Vincent and Mary while Ricky flees. Maddy later awakens tied to a tree and encounters Willy, who sets her free, mentioning that she can escape on his boat. While chasing Ricky through the forest, Vincent and Mary stop to record some footage. Vincent bites a chunk out of Mary's neck which eventually kills her. Ricky attacks Vincent but is ultimately shot dead himself. While searching the forest with Emily, Johnny kisses her for the first time. Overhearing Ricky's death, Johnny leaves to investigate.

Meanwhile, Maddy searches for Willy's boat, but instead finds Emily standing next to a water well. Maddy warns Emily about the murders. Emily then pushes Maddy down the well, impaling her on a spike. Vincent emerges from a nearby tree, congratulating Emily for her performance and luring the students to the island. Vincent informs Emily that Mary is now dead, and it is revealed that the pair had an affair behind Mary's back. Johnny soon returns to Emily, but Vincent knocks him unconscious.

Johnny awakens in the dungeon and finds Sylvia still trapped in the cage, which is hanging above a pool of piranha fish. Willy arrives and frees Johnny. Vincent and Emily also arrive and shoot Willy in the chest with an arrow, presumably killing him. In the ensuing fight, Vincent is severely injured, and Sylvia is plunged into the pool of piranha. Johnny is chased to the beach, where Vincent and Emily catch him. However, Willy reveals himself to have survived and fatally stabs Vincent. Emily quickly shoots Willy in the head, killing him. Johnny continues to fight with Emily before Sylvia also reveals herself to have survived and kills Emily. Deputy Radley then arrives on the island to take Johnny and Sylvia home. Deputy Radley, however, is secretly involved with the snuff film.

== Cast ==
- Danica McKellar as Emily
- Jay Kenneth Johnson as Johnny
- Gabrielle Richens as Sylvia
- William Forsythe as Willy
- Sean Kanan as Vincent King
- Juliet Landau as Mary Shelley
- Adrienne Frantz as Maddy
- Justin Chon as Ricky
- Travis Schuldt as Tim
- Wondgy 'Won-G' Bruny as Q
- Kane Hodder as First Victim
- Burt Young as J.T. Bates
- Tony Burton as Sheriff Stoker
- Lochlyn Munro as Deputy Radley
- Mike Wittlin as Mr. Argento
- Jenna Morasca as Tim's Girlfriend
- AJ De Roque as Jenna's Boyfriend

== Reception ==
The movie was not received well by critics. Steve Barton of Dread Central criticized the "paper-thin" storyline. Black Horror Movies criticized the film for excessive clichés.
