= Charlie's Farm =

2015 Australian slasher film by Chris Sun

- Theatrical release poster
- Directed by: Chris Sun
- Written by: Chris Sun
- Produced by: Dominic Crisci; Sean Gannon; Chris Sun
- Starring: Tara Reid; Nathan Jones; Allira Jaques; Bill Moseley; Kane Hodder; Dean Kirkright; Sam Coward
- Cinematography: Scott Kimber
- Edited by: Michael Gilbert
- Music by: Mark Smythe
- Production company: Slaughter FX
- Release dates: 4 December 2014 (Australian theatres); 1 March 2015 (United States)
- Running time: 88 minutes
- Country: Australia
- Language: English
- Budget: $3,000,000

Charlie's Farm is a 2015 Australian slasher film written and directed by Chris Sun. It tells the story of the violent history of Charlie's Farm, brutally brought to life when four horror seeking youths stumble across a legend that refuses to die. The film stars Tara Reid, Nathan Jones, Allira Jaques, Bill Moseley, Kane Hodder, Dean Kirkright, and Sam Coward.

It was an independently-made film with a $2 million budget. It was filmed around Imbil, Kenilworth, Gympie and the Sunshine Coast in Queensland.

== Plot ==
Friends Jason and Mick plot a road trip to "Charlie's Farm", which is believed to be haunted. The two persuade Jason's girlfriend Natasha, to call her best friend Melanie to come with them. However, they do not inform them about the history of the site. After hours of driving, the group stop at a pub to eat and ask directions to the farm. A pub patron named Old Blue warns them not to continue, resulting in a fight between Mick and another patron. The patron angrily changes his mind after the fight and gives them directions. At a campfire, Melanie and Natasha confront the two and Mick eventually tells them the story of Charlie's Farm:

In the 1980s, John Wilson and his wife Meredith are farmers, murderers, and cannibals. The local townspeople, led by Blue, confront the couple over a slew of missing backpackers. This includes a girl named Amber, whom the two had just murdered and eaten. During the altercation, Blue shoots John dead while Meredith escapes with their mentally handicapped son Charlie. Meredith manages to hide Charlie before she is caught, interrogated, and beaten to death by the locals while Charlie watches. Charlie is never seen again and presumed dead.

The next day, desperate to find the farm, Jason calls their boxer friend Tony Stewart for directions. Tony warns them to be careful at the Farm. Arriving at the gate to the property, they decide to walk to the farmhouse. Upon exploring the house, Melanie finds an old teddy bear of Charlie's and decides to keep it. In the middle of the night when the group are sleeping, Melanie awakens to see an enormous, hulking figure looming over them; the full-grown Charlie. Melanie dismisses it as a dream.

Morning comes and two backpackers, Gordon and Alyssa, arrive at the farm for the same reason as the group. Later on, the group decides to split up and explore the property. Gordon and Alyssa come upon a barn which appears to be Charlie's base of operations. Charlie then ambushes them and kills Gordon with an axe to the chest and Alyssa by crushing her head beneath a tractor wheel. Meanwhile, Mick and Melanie discover a lake and go skinny dipping.

They spot Charlie who is watching them from the dam. Mick goes to confront Charlie, who cuts off Mick's genitals and shoves them down his throat, killing him. Melanie runs into the woods, but is killed by Charlie, who rips out her lower jaw. Natasha and Jason find another barn. Jason insists they go inside but Natasha refuses and waits. Tony, fearing for the group, goes to the Farm to check on them. Meanwhile, Jason, who was taking a long time inside, alarms Natasha who follows him in. Jason warns Natasha to be quiet as he finds Charlie roaming inside the barn.

Tony arrives and faces Charlie in hand-to-hand combat. Jason tries to assist, but Tony is killed when Charlie tears his throat out. Jason is then also killed when Charlie slits his throat in front of Natasha. Natasha attempts to flee but is knocked unconscious and captured by Charlie. She then wakes up in an underground chamber. Natasha breaks free and escapes, discovering many corpses of Charlie's previous victims. Old Blue, the elderly patron from the pub, appears and assists Natasha in escaping. Charlie, however, catches up to them and kills Old Blue with an axe to the back. Natasha takes Old Blue's rifle and shoots Charlie in the chest, seemingly killing him. She gets to Old Blue's truck, but Charlie, who survived the gunshot, surprises her by impaling her with a rifle and pulling out her guts, which he tosses away after killing her. Charlie then picks up her dead body and begins to carry it back to the Farm.

== Cast ==
- Tara Reid as Natasha
- Dean Kirkright as Jason
- Allira Jaques as Melanie
- Sam Coward as Mick "Donkey"
- Kane Hodder as Tony Stewart
- Genna Chanelle Hayes as Alyssa
- Dave Beamish as Gordon
- Bill Moseley as John Wilson
- Trudi Ross as Meredith Wilson
- Madeleine Kennedy as Amber
- Jeff Watson as Blue
- Brad Bromfield as Pub Patron
- Lindsay Edgecomb as Sally
- Justin Gerardin as Peter
- Nathan Jones as Charlie Wilson
  - Cameron Caulfield as young Charlie Wilson

== Release ==
Charlie's Farm premiered in Australian theatres on 4 December 2014, and was released in the United States on 1 March 2015. The Blu-ray and DVD of the film was released on 17 June 2015 in Australia and UK. It was also released on 25 July 2015 in Germany in mediabook format by Meteor Film.

== Reception ==
Chris Coffel from Bloody Disgusting gave the film a mostly positive review, commending the film's kills, and entertainment value, while noting the film's weak story, and bad acting. Dan Caps from HorrorNews.net rated the film a score of two out of four, criticizing the film's lack of character development, script, performances, and third act, calling the film "unsatisfying". Caps however, commended the film's cinematography, sound effects, and special effects.
