= Aaron Tanner =

American musician and writer

- Born: 1976 (age 48–49); Evansville, Indiana, United States
- Known for: Graphic design
- Notable work: see Bibliography
- Website: www.aarontanner.com

Aaron Tanner is an American graphic designer, author, archivist, and musician who creates coffee table books on underground bands and artists.

== Career ==
Raised in the Midwest, Tanner drew inspiration from everyday visuals including the logos on railroad cars, matchbook advertisements, and other regional imagery. His design work gained recognition within the underground music scene, leading to him becoming Ween's resident designer in 2002, a role he has held for more than two decades.

In 2014, while compiling a book on the Pixies, Tanner discovered that the visual archives of many underground bands had not been formally published. He subsequently founded Melodic Virtue, an independent publisher “dedicated to preserving and promoting the legacies of underground bands through limited-run coffee table books.” Through Melodic Virtue, he has curated and released visual histories featuring rare photographs, artwork, and memorabilia. His publications include books on The Residents, Butthole Surfers, Ministry, Face to Face, and Cardiacs.

Tanner was a founding member of the instrumental group Stationary Odyssey alongside Brett Siler. The band released four albums before disbanding. Their final release was a split 7" single with Joey Santiago and David Lovering of the Pixies. He later formed the noise rock group Off-Ox and has collaborated musically with Nick Rhodes (Duran Duran), Rob Crow (Pinback), Roy Mayorga (Ministry), and Zach Hill and Spencer Seim (Hella).

== Achievements ==
His work in publishing has been added to the libraries and permanent collections of the Smithsonian, The Museum of Modern Art, Rock and Roll Hall of Fame, and The Punk Rock Museum. Butthole Surfers: What Does Regret Mean? was named LA Weekly’s Book of the Month in 2019.

== Bibliography ==
- Pixies: A Visual History, Volume 1 (Madtempest, 2014)
- Face to Face: 25 Years of SoCal Punk (Melodic Virtue, 2017)
- Butthole Surfers: What Does Regret Mean? (Melodic Virtue, 2019)
- Ministry: Prescripture (Melodic Virtue, 2019)
- Lil Bub: The Earth Years (Melodic Virtue, 2021)
- The Residents: A Sight for Sore Eyes, Vol. 1 (Melodic Virtue, 2022)
- The Residents: A Sight for Sore Eyes, Vol. 2 (Melodic Virtue, 2023)
- Joan of Arc: A Window & A Mirror (Joyful Noise Recordings, 2024)
- Cardiacs: A Big Book and a Band and the Whole World Window (Melodic Virtue, 2025)

== Discography ==
With Byre

- Here in Dead Lights (May 15, 2018, Joyful Noise Recordings)

With Off-Ox

- Best Best Western (September 2, 2016, Au Fox Records)
- Tender Titan (August 17, 2018, Au Fox Records)

With Star Stunted

- Star Stunted Santa Dog (April 15, 2022, Melodic Virtue)
- Star Stunted II Mahogany Wood (March 8, 2024, Melodic Virtue)
