= Below Zero (2011 film) =

- Film Poster
- Directed by: Justin Thomas Ostensen
- Written by: Signe Olynyk
- Produced by: Judy Fox; Chad Kowalchuk
- Starring: Edward Furlong; Michael Berryman; Kristin Booth
- Cinematography: Norm Li
- Edited by: Justin Thomas Ostensen
- Music by: Jeff Tymoschuk
- Distributed by: Screen Media
- Release date: 18 September 2011 (Calgary International Film Festival)
- Country: Canada
- Language: English

Below Zero is a 2011 Canadian thriller-horror film. It is directed by Justin Thomas Ostensen, and stars Edward Furlong, Michael Berryman and Kristin Booth.

== Plot ==
A screenwriter suffering from writer's block locks himself in a meat locker. There, he hopes to come up with the perfect story for a horror film about a man trapped in a meat locker. He imagines a story in which a man is menaced by an evil butcher. However, reality and fiction begin to merge, and his imaginary butcher turns into a real threat.

== Cast ==
- Edward Furlong as Jack/Frank
- Michael Berryman as Gunner
- Kristin Booth as Penny
- Dee Hannah as Mrs. Hatcher
- Michael Eisner as Monty
- Sadie Madu

== Production ==
Writer Signe Olynyk developed writer's block whilst writing the film. In order to overcome it, she locked herself in a meat locker for five days to develop the story.

In February 2010, it was revealed that director Justin Thomas Ostensen would start filming in March 2010 in Canada. Then in March, The Hills Have Eyes actor Michael Berryman was announced to appear in the film as Gunnar. Edward Furlong was also announced in April 2012. In the same month Kristin Booth, Michael Eisner, Sadie Madu and Dee Hannah were also added.

Filming took place in Alberta, Canada.

The film was originally titled Below Zero 3D but in January 2012, it was revealed the 3D had been dropped from the film.

== Release ==
The world premiere was at the Calgary International Film Festival, 18 September 2011.

The film had 31 official selections at film festivals, including:

- A Night of Horror International Film Festival. Sydney, Australia (March 2012)
- Arizona International Film Festival
- Austin Film Festival. Austin, Texas, US (October 2011)
- Derby City Film Festival. Louisville, Kentucky, US (February 2012)
- Garden State Film Festival. Asbury Park, New Jersey, US (March 2012)
- Independent Filmmakers Showcase Film Festival. Los Angeles, California, US (March 2012)
- Indie Horror Film Festival. Chicago, Illinois, US (March 2012)

It was released on home video 28 August 2012.

== Reception ==
Mike Saulters from Slackerwood.com gave a mixed review of the film, saying, "the story becomes a muddled mess that doesn't have a clear destination" and calls Kristin Booth's character "annoying as hell". However, Saulters praises the acting of Edward Furlong and Michael Berryman noting they are the "highlight of the movie". Martin Unsworth of Starburst rated the film with 8 out of 10 stars and wrote that he expected it to be a routine slasher film, but it turned out to be "fresh and surprising".

=== Awards ===
==== Won ====
- San Diego Film Festival: Best Screenplay
- Toronto Independent Film Festival: Best Sci-Fi/Horror Film
- Fright Night Film Fest: Best Soundtrack
- Indie Horror Film Festival: Best Special Effects, Special Recognition
- Los Angeles Fear and Fantasy Film Festival: Best Screenplay
- Prestige Film Awards: Gold Award for Best Script, Gold Award for Best Art Direction
- American International Film Festival: Best Horror Movie

==== Nominated ====
- Hoboken International Film Festival: Best of the Festival, Best Feature Film, Best Screenplay, Best Actor (Furlong), Best Actress (Booth), Best Editor
- Indie Horror Film Festival: Best Sound, Best Editing, Best Director, Best Feature Film.
