= Mark Smythe =

New Zealand-born composer and academic (1972–2026)

- Born: Mark Cyprian Ward Smythe; 1972; New Zealand
- Died: 9 May 2026 (aged 53); Mount Wilson, California, U.S.
- Education: Australian Film, Television and Radio School (MA)
- Occupations: Composer; academic
- Years active: 2004–2026
- Known for: Film, television, and choral composition
- Website: marksmythe.com

Mark Cyprian Ward Smythe (1972 – 9 May 2026) was an American-based New Zealand film, television and concert composer and academic. He was best known for scoring the 2022 Australian shark thriller The Reef: Stalked, for which he received nominations at the Society of Composers & Lyricists (SCL) Awards and the World Soundtrack Awards in 2023.

== Early life and education ==
Smythe was born in New Zealand in 1972, the son of Brian Smythe and Ginny Ward. He was raised in Nelson and its suburb Washington Valley, and at age 7, he started singing in Nelson Cathedral. He later played the violin and clarinet in the Nelson Symphony Orchestra. After his high school education at Nelson College from 1986 to 1989, Smythe moved to Dunedin. He played in several rock bands there before pursuing screen composition. He later relocated to Australia, joining the rights organization APRA AMCOS in 2004 and working for four years in its Melbourne office as a legal liaison. He earned a master's degree in screen composition from the Australian Film, Television and Radio School.

== Career ==
Smythe moved to Los Angeles in 2013, having obtained United States permanent residency under the "alien of extraordinary ability" category. Soon after his arrival, he received a Hollywood Music in Media Award at the organization's 2013 ceremony, and went on to receive further HMMA nominations in 2015, 2017 and 2021.

His screen credits included the horror films Daddy's Little Girl (2012), Boar, Charlie's Farm and The Possessed, all collaborations with Australian director Chris Sun, as well as the war drama Unfallen, the romantic comedy Love You Like That and The Reef: Stalked (2022), directed by Andrew Traucki. He won Best Score at the Australian Screen Industry Network Awards for Daddy's Little Girl in 2012 and Charlie's Farm in 2015. His 2023 SCL and World Soundtrack Award nominations for The Reef: Stalked brought him further international recognition.

Outside of screen work, Smythe composed concert and choral music. His orchestral suite Flying South, drawn from his score for a Natural History New Zealand docudrama traversing the South Island, was performed by the Christchurch Symphony Orchestra, and he made his concert conducting debut in 2017 with the Ruse Philharmonic in Bulgaria, leading the Fiordland movement from the same work. He was selected as a Composer Fellow for the 2024 Choral Arts Initiative PREMIERE | Project Festival, which premiered his piece Song of the Sea – Part I for choir and electric guitar, and he collaborated with the LA Choral Lab.

Within the Los Angeles screen-music community, Smythe served as the Los Angeles administrator and, from 2018 to 2021, chief operating officer of the Society of Composers & Lyricists. Smythe taught media composition at California State University, Northridge, and from the summer of 2025 served as Department Head of Composing for Visual Media at the Los Angeles College of Music.

== Death ==
On the morning of 9 May 2026, Smythe collapsed while hiking with friends on the Mount Wilson Trail near Sierra Madre, California. Companions and fellow hikers attempted CPR before the Sierra Madre Fire Department and the Sierra Madre Search and Rescue Team arrived, but he was pronounced dead at the scene. He was 53. The Los Angeles County Medical Examiner attributed his death to atherosclerotic cardiovascular disease.
