= Suburban Sprawl Music =

American independent record label

- Founded: 1999
- Founder: Erik Koppin
- Distributor: Quack! Media
- Genre: Rock
- Country of origin: U.S.
- Location: Livonia, Michigan
- Official website: suburbansprawlmusic.com

Suburban Sprawl Music is an American independent record label founded in 1999 in Livonia, Michigan. The label was started by Erik Koppin, who managed the label from 1999 until 2004, when the label roster decided to run Suburban Sprawl collectively. Since 2004, operations have been handled by roughly 20 individuals, ranging from label band members to friends of Suburban Sprawl. A post office box is maintained in Livonia, and records are kept in Ann Arbor. In December 2007, Suburban Sprawl merged with Ann Arbor multimedia company, Quack!Media, and consequently is now based in Ann Arbor. Contributions to the label come from individuals in various Michigan locales, including Mount Pleasant, Lansing, and Metro Detroit in general. Suburban Sprawl artists have been actively touring the United States since the label's inception.

The label's namesake stems from urban sprawl and the label's initial base in Livonia.

== Roster ==
- Arranged Marriage
- Desktop
- Javelins
- Love Axe
- The Pop Project
- Sea of Japan
- The Word Play

Past

- Scott Allen & The Breakdance
- Jason Anderson
- El Boxeo
- Child Bite
- The City on Film
- Sean Hoen
- Allan James and the Cold Wave
- Judah Johnson
- The Recital
- Red Shirt Brigade
- Rescue
- Nate Ruess
- Saturday Looks Good to Me
- Summersault
- Those Transatlanics
- Thunderbirds Are Now!
- Windy & Carl

== See also ==
- List of record labels
