= Child Bite =

American punk/metal band

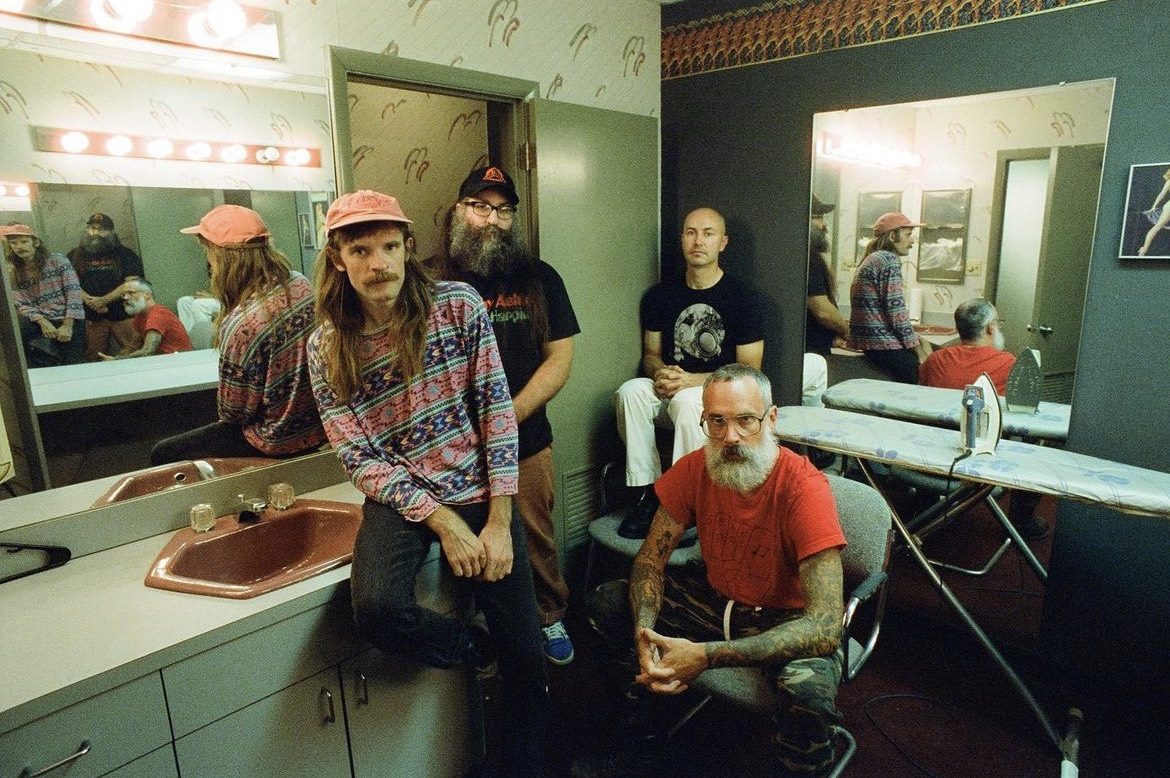
- L–R: Jeremy Waun, Sean Clancy, Jeff Porter, Shawn Knight

Background information
- Origin: Detroit, Michigan, U.S.
- Genres: Noise rock, hardcore punk, heavy metal
- Years active: 2005–present
- Labels: Housecore, Forge Again, Joyful Noise
- Members: Shawn Knight; Sean Clancy; Jeremy Waun; Jeff Porter
- Past members: Brandon Sczomak; Jeff Kraus; Ben Moore; Zach Norton; Danny Sperry; Christian Doble
- Website: childbite.com

Child Bite is an American punk/metal band formed in 2005 in Detroit, Michigan.

== History ==
The band's core members are founding vocalist Shawn Knight and longtime bassist Sean Clancy. Child Bite's sound has been described as "enormous and predatory, from the baleful rhythm section to Shawn Knight's [frightening vocals]."

In the spring of 2013, the band released a split 7-inch with David Yow of Jesus Lizard and Scratch Acid. Morbid Hits, a collection of Anal Cunt cover songs, was released exclusively as a 5-inch vinyl record in early 2014 via Housecore Records. This release featured the band being fronted by Pantera/Down frontman Phil Anselmo.

During the COVID-19 pandemic, Child Bite collaborated with Black Tusk on cover versions of Prong's "Snap Your Fingers, Snap Your Neck" and Butthole Surfers' "Who Was in My Room Last Night?" The latter features vocals from actor Bill Moseley, who appears in the music video.

As of 2024, Child Bite has toured the U.S. with such acts as Pantera, Lamb of God, Down, Voivod, Negative Approach, Superjoint, Poison Idea, Unsane, and Black Tusk.

== Band members ==
=== Current ===
- Shawn Knight – vocals
- Sean Clancy – bass
- Jeremy Waun – guitar
- Jeff Porter – drums

=== Former ===
- Brandon Sczomak – guitar
- Jon Vinson – drums
- Jeff Kraus – drums
- Ben Moore – drums
- Zach Norton – guitar, bass
- Danny Sperry – drums
- Christian Doble – saxophone, backing vocals

== Discography ==
=== Albums ===
- Blow Off the Omens (2019)
- Negative Noise (2016)
- The Living Breathing Organ Summer LP (2010)
- Fantastic Gusts of Blood LP (2008)
- Wild Feast LP (2006)

=== Anthologies ===
- Burnt Offerings (2018, Housecore Records/Forge Again Records)

=== EPs ===
- Split 12-inch w/ STNNNG (2017, Forge Again Records)
- Strange Waste EP (2014, Housecore Records)
- Morbid Hits EP w/ Phil Anselmo (2014, Housecore Records)
- Split 12-inch w/ We Are Hex (2013, Forge Again Records)
- Vision Crimes EP (2013, Joyful Noise Recordings)
- Monomania EP (2012, Joyful Noise Recordings)
- Split 12-inch w/ Dope Body (2011, FAR)
- Exquisite Luxury EP (2008, SSM)
- Gold Thriller (2007, JNR/SSM)
- Physical Education Split EP w/ Stationary Odyssey (2007, Joyful Noise Recordings)

=== Singles ===
- Jerk Off Your Life 1" Button w/ download (2016, Housecore Records)
- Flexed Heads 7-inch w/ Hellmouth, Old Gods & Golden Torso (2014, Corpse Flower)
- Gods of Love 7-inch w/ Hellmouth, Old Gods & Golden Torso (2014, Corpse Flower)
- Demonomaniacs 7-inch w/ Hellmouth, Old Gods & Golden Torso (2012, Dyspepsidisc)
- Chickenshit Conformists 7-inch w/ Hellmouth, Old Gods & Golden Torso (2012, Dyspepsidisc)
- Family Men 7-inch w/ Hellmouth, Old Gods & Golden Torso (2012, Bellyache)
- Split 7-inch w/ DD/MM/YYYY (2009, Wham City/Dyspepsidisc)
- Split 7-inch w/ Big Bear (2009, JNR)
- Split 7-inch w/ This Moment in Black History (2009, FAR)
