= Kane Hodder =

American actor and stuntman

- Hodder at GalaxyCon Des Moines in 2026
- Born: Kane Warren Hodder; April 8, 1955 (age 71); Auburn, California, U.S.
- Occupations: Actor, stuntman
- Years active: 1973–present
- Known for: Jason Voorhees (Friday the 13th); Victor Crowley (Hatchet)
- Spouse: Susan B. Hodder (m. 1984)
- Children: 2

Kane Warren Hodder (born April 8, 1955) is an American actor and stuntman. He is best known for his portrayal of Jason Voorhees in the Friday the 13th franchise, with four appearances in the film series: Friday the 13th Part VII: The New Blood, Friday the 13th Part VIII: Jason Takes Manhattan, Jason Goes to Hell: The Final Friday (in which he also played Freddy Krueger's clawed glove hand), and Jason X; and one in the video game Friday the 13th: The Game. He is also known for his role as Victor Crowley in the Hatchet series. He also played Leatherface during the stunts of Leatherface: The Texas Chainsaw Massacre III and the motion capture in the video game The Texas Chain Saw Massacre.

== Early life ==
Hodder was born in Auburn, California, in 1955.

== Career ==
Early in his career during an interview, Hodder offered to show the interviewer and her cameraman a fire stunt. It went horribly wrong, leaving him with 2nd and 3rd degree burns over much of his upper body. It was because of these burns that he was initially selected to portray Freddy Krueger in A Nightmare on Elm Street, a role that would eventually go to Robert Englund with whom he formed a lifelong friendship. Hodder was the first actor to portray Jason Voorhees more than once, in a total of four consecutive movies from Friday the 13th Part VII: The New Blood to Jason X. He portrayed horror icon Leatherface through the stunt work of the 1990 film Leatherface: The Texas Chainsaw Massacre III and played Freddy Krueger's clawed glove hand at the ending scene of Jason Goes to Hell: The Final Friday. He also acted as a police guard in Jason Goes to Hell. He appeared in an episode of The Arsenio Hall Show to promote Friday the 13th Part VIII: Jason Takes Manhattan, in costume as Jason.

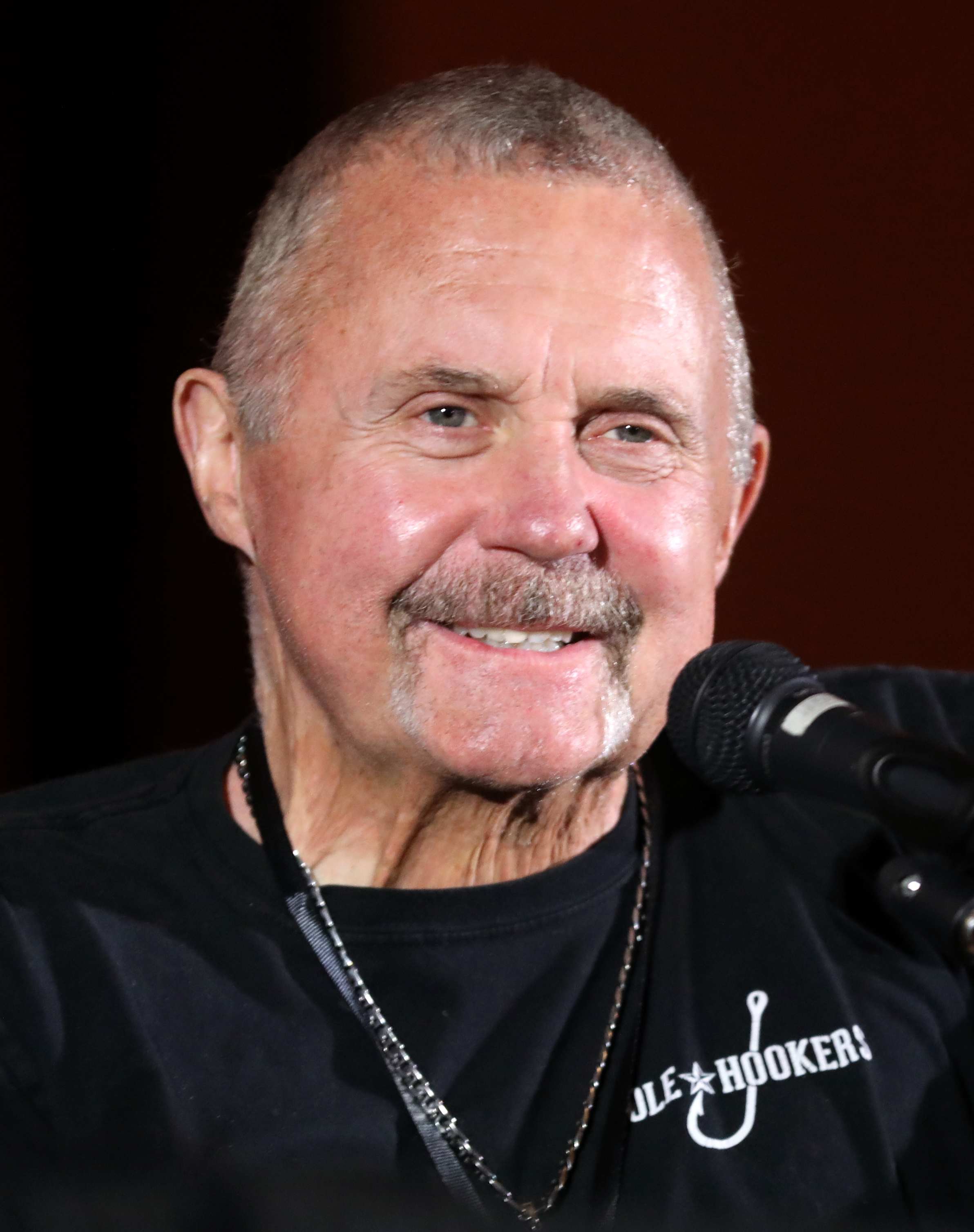
Hodder at an event in 2024

Although he offered to reprise his role as Jason Voorhees in the 2003 film Freddy vs. Jason, director Ronny Yu replaced Hodder with 6 ft 5 in (1.96 m) Canadian stuntman Ken Kirzinger. The switch created controversy among fans of the series and has been credited to several rumors, including Kirzinger's location in Canada and his height compared to Robert Englund, the actor who portrayed Freddy Krueger, while Yu himself stated that it was New Line Cinema's idea to do so. Though Hodder still expresses resentment over not being chosen, he is still good friends with Kirzinger and Englund. In 2011 Hodder wrote, along with author Michael Aloisi, his autobiography Unmasked: The True Story of the World's Most Prolific Cinematic Killer. This was in 2014 turned into a webseries, which was released as The Killer & I.

Hodder starred in the slasher film Hatchet as main character Victor Crowley, a physically deformed young boy who comes back from the dead to kill the people who invade the swamp where he lives— a similar story in relation to that of Jason Voorhees. The role earned him the Horror Jury Award for Best Actor at the Fantastic Fest in Austin, Texas. He reprised this role in Hatchet II, Hatchet III and Victor Crowley.

Hodder portrayed Grawesome Crutal in the slasher film, Muck and its sequel Muck: Feast of Saint Patrick. He co-starred with Doug Jones and Michael McShane in the horror comedy film Love in the Time of Monsters. In March 2015, he was part of Adam Green's ArieScope webseries Adam Green's Scary Sleepover.

Kane Hodder reprised his role as Jason Voorhees in Friday the 13th: The Game. In the first episode "Camp Crystal" from the television series Crystal Lake, a reference to the character named Lieutenant Hodder McKane, the founder of Crystal Lake in 1779, in honor to Hodder.

== Personal life ==
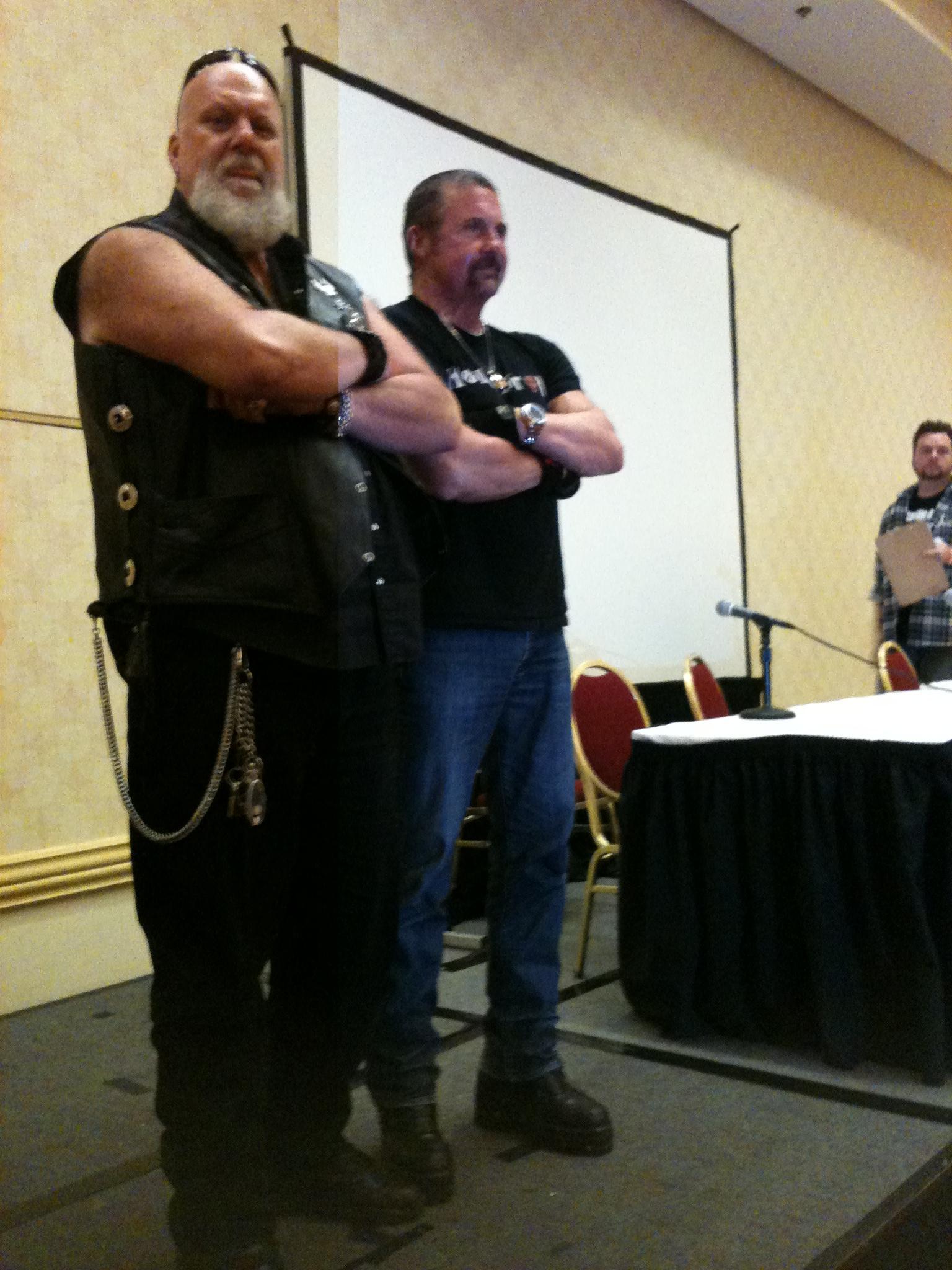
Kane Hodder and R. A. Mihailoff

Hodder has the word "Kill!" tattooed on the back of his bottom lip. He spends time working with children in burn centers, and despite the roles he often plays, Hodder has been described as a friendly man who loves to meet his fans.

For a long time, Hodder claimed his favorite kill scene in his films was the "sleeping bag against a tree" scene from Friday the 13th Part VII: The New Blood. He now considers the one where he rips a woman's face in half from Hatchet (2006) to be his favorite.

Hodder is a noted Juggalo, a fan of the group Insane Clown Posse. To reflect this, he has a custom charm of the group's "hatchetman" logo holding a machete instead of a hatchet, a reference to his role as Jason.

Hodder appeared on the December 4, 2012, episode of the TruTV show Hardcore Pawn, in which he had a miniature gold mask made from a piece a fan had made for him.

Hodder is also an avid ghost hunter. He founded the Hollywood Ghost Hunters group with former stuntman and friend Rick "Stuntman" McCullum, who was a stunt double for Sid Haig.

In 1984, he married his wife Susan B. Hodder. They have two sons, Jace and Reed.

== Autobiography ==
Hodder co-wrote an autobiography with author Mike Aloisi. The book is about his life and experience in the film industry and was released on October 1, 2011.

Unmasked documents the unlikely true story of a boy who was taunted and beaten relentlessly by bullies throughout his childhood. Kane only escaped his tormentors when he moved to a tiny island in the South Pacific where he lived for all of his teen years. After living shirtless in a jungle for a while, he headed back to America where he fell in love with doing stunts—only to have his love burn him, literally. For the first time ever, Kane tells the true story of the burn injury that nearly killed him at the start of his career. The entire story of his recovery, the emotional and physical damage it caused, his fight to break back into the industry that almost killed him, and his rise to become a film actor are told in Kane's own voice.

== Filmography ==
=== Film ===
Year	Title	Role	Notes
1974	California Split	Reno Poker Player	
1980	Alligator	Ramón	
1983	Lone Wolf McQuade	Goon	
1984	Hardbodies	Older Geek	
1985	City Limits	Unfriendly DA	
1986	Avenging Force	Thug	
1987	House II: The Second Story	Gorilla	
1987	Open House	Trailer Narration (voice)	
1987	Prison	Forsythe/Gas Mask Guard	
1988	Friday the 13th Part VII: The New Blood	Jason Voorhees	
1989	Trained to Kill	Bodyguard	
1989	Friday the 13th Part VIII: Jason Takes Manhattan	Jason Voorhees	
1989	Best of the Best	Burt	
1991	9½ Ninjas!	-	
1991	Out for Justice	Henchman at Party	
1991	The Rapture	Security Guard	
1991	Alligator II: The Mutation	Billy Boy	
1991	Ghoulies III: Ghoulies Go to College	Man in Rolling Mop Bucket	
1992	House IV	The Human Pizza	
1992	Under Siege	Commando	
1993	No Place to Hide	Weller	
1993	Best of the Best II	Backdoor Man	
1993	Jason Goes to Hell: The Final Friday	Jason Voorhees / FBI Security Guard / Freddy Krueger's hand (uncredited)	
1993	Father Hood	Bus Driver	
1993	Rubdown	Simon	TV movie
1994	Pumpkinhead II: Blood Wings	Keith Knox	
1995	Scanners: The Showdown	Kidnapper #1	
1995	Project Metalbeast	MetalBeast	
1995	Steel Frontier	Kinton	Video
1995	Best of the Best 3: No Turning Back	Neo-Nazi Gunman	
1995	Fair Game	Helicopter Henchman	
1996	Crash Dive	Henchman killed by Carter	Video
1996	Wildly Available	Driver	
1997	The Big Fall	Bodyguard/Gunfiring Mobster	
1997	The Protector	Guard Falling Down Stairs	
1997	Wishmaster	Merritt's Guard	
1997	T.N.T.	Townie #3	
1997	The Shooter	Fighter	
1998	Children of the Corn V: Fields of Terror	Bartender	Video
1998	Watchers Reborn	Clerk	
1998	Whatever It Takes	Bar Thug	
1999	Hitman's Run	Thug	
2000	Geppetto	Pleasure Island Inhabitant	
2001	Jason X	Jason Voorhees/Uber Jason	
2003	Daredevil	Fallon's Bodyguard	
2003	Dark Wolf	Biker Guy	Video
2003	Grind	Sandy's Dad	
2003	Monster	Undercover Cop	
2005	2001 Maniacs	Jason	
2005	The Devil's Rejects	Officer with Gas Mask on Left	
2006	Hatchet	Victor Crowley/Thomas Crowley	
2006	Room 6	Homeless Demon	
2006	Behind the Mask: The Rise of Leslie Vernon	Guy at Elm Street House	
2006	Fallen Angels	Envy	
2007	Ed Gein: The Butcher of Plainfield	Ed Gein	Video
2007	Hack!	First Victim	
2007	Dead Noon	Undead Cowboy	Video
2007	Born	Asmodeus/Cardinal	
2008	B.T.K.	Dennis Rader	Video
2009	Old Habits Die Hard	Jonah	
2009	Bundy: A Legacy of Evil	Warden	Video
2010	Frozen	Cody	
2010	Hatchet II	Victor Crowley/Thomas Crowley	
2011	The Afflicted	Hank	
2011	Exit 33	Ike	
2011	Chillerama	Meshugannah	
2011	No Rest for the Wicked: A Basil & Moebius Adventure	Ghoul Brother #1/Security Guard #1	Short
2011	3 Musketeers	Dr. Kim	
2011	Monsterpiece Theatre Volume II	Milo	
2011	The Family	Stone	
2012	Robin Hood: Ghosts of Sherwood	Little John	
2012	Among Friends	Limo Driver	
2012	Driving Lessons	Michael Myers	Short
2013	Hatchet III	Victor Crowley	
2013	Exit to Hell	Sickle	
2014	Love in the Time of Monsters	Lou	
2014	Digging up The Marrow	Himself	
2014	Alice D	Sr. Davenport	
2014	Abandoned in the Dark	Hutchinson	
2014	Fury: The Tales of Ronan Pierce	Eddie White	
2014	Charlie's Farm	Tony Stewart	
2015	Muck	Grawesome Crutal	
2015	Old 37	Jon Roy	
2015	Tag	Tom	
2015	Almost Mercy	Coach Elwood	
2015	The Devil Dogs of Kilo Company	1st Sgt. Altum	
2016	Smothered	Striper	
2016	Chainsaw Maidens	Angel of Death	
2017	Check Point	Cyris	
2017	Victor Crowley	Victor Crowley	
2017	Death House	Sieg	
2017	An Accidental Zombie (Named Ted)	Frank Lee	
2019	Shed of the Dead	Mr. Parsons	
2019	Paralyzed with Fear	Chemock	
2020	Impractical Jokers: The Movie	Bodyguard	
2020	The Good Things Devils Do	Percy	
2020	Freddy vs. Jason vs. Ash Comic Film	Jason Voorhees (voice)	
2020	Stay Home	Kane	Short
2021	Knifecorp	Angus Finn	
2021	Room 9	Beau Johnson	
2021	Death Breed	Jonah Hollis	
2021	13 Fanboy	Himself	
2022	Dead by Midnight (Y2Kill)	Kane Hodder	
2022	Tow	The Mechanic	
2022	Hayride to Hell	Sheriff Jubel	
2023	Kill Her Goats	Goatface	
2023	The Activated Man	Laszlo Gabriel	
2024	They Turned Us Into Killers	Beau Sr.	

=== Television ===
Year	Title	Role	Notes
1980	Enos	Pool Hall Hood	Episode: "Where's the Corpus?"
1983	The Renegades	Distrom	Episode: "Target: Marciano"
1986	The Twilight Zone	Gramma	Episode: "Gramma/Personal Demons/Cold Reading"
1986	Hill Street Blues	Eddie	Episode: "Amazing Grace"
1990	Horror Hall of Fame	Jason Voorhees	Cameo Appearance
1993	Walker, Texas Ranger	Curly	Episode: "Storm Warning"
1994	The Adventures of Brisco County, Jr.	Cop Near Bank Vault	Episode: "Bye Bly"
1997	Renegade	Fighter	Episode: "Born Under a Bad Sign"
1997	L.A. Heat	Thug	Episode: "Old Scores"
1998	Nash Bridges	Josh Denkirk	Episode: "Imposters"
1998	Martial Law	Hessman's Henchman	Episode: "Lock-Up"
1999	V.I.P.	Matthew Adair	Episode: "Good Val Hunting"
1999	Star Trek: Deep Space Nine	Jem'Hadar Soldier	Episode: "What You Leave Behind"
2002	Boomtown	Russian Gunman	Episode: "The Freak"
2003	Charmed	Thug at Pizza Place	Episode: "The Day the Magic Died"
2005	Alias	Lead Thug in Shanghai	Episode: "Authorized Personnel Only: Part 1"
2009	Fear Clinic	Villatoro	Main Cast
2012	The Mentalist	Red John's Henchman	Episode: "The Crimson Hat"
2012–13	Holliston	Himself	Recurring Cast
2026	Dexter: Resurrection	The New York Ripper	Episode: "Risky Business"

=== Web ===
Year	Title	Role	Notes	Ref.
2026	Friday the 13th: Camp Crystal Legacy	Himself	2 episodes; documentary web series	

=== Video games ===
Year	Title	Role
2017	Friday the 13th: The Game	Jason Voorhees / Roy Burns
2023	The Texas Chain Saw Massacre	Leatherface / Grandfather

=== Documentary films ===
Year	Title	Ref
1993	Zombie Jamboree: The 25th Anniversary of Night of the Living Dead	
1994	Spooky World	
2005	30 Days in Hell: The Making of 'The Devil's Rejects	
2009	His Name Was Jason: 30 Years of Friday the 13th	
2010	Never Sleep Again: The Elm Street Legacy	
2013	Crystal Lake Memories: The Complete History of Friday the 13th	
2018	To Hell and Back: The Kane Hodder Story	
2019	In Search of Darkness	
2025	Hearts of Darkness: The Making of the Final Friday	

=== Stunts ===
Year	Title	Note
1977	Emergency!	TV series (uncredited)
1980	In God We Tru$t	Uncredited
1983	Lone Wolf McQuade	
1984	Hardbodies	
1985	Volunteers	Uncredited
1985	The Hills Have Eyes Part II	
1986	Days of Our Lives	TV series (uncredited)
1986	House	
1986	Avenging Force	
1986	The Patriot	
1987	Who's the Boss?	TV series (uncredited)
1987	American Ninja 2: The Confrontation	
1987	House II: The Second Story	
1987	Prison	
1988	Born to Race	
1988	Friday the 13th Part VII: The New Blood	
1988	Waxwork	
1989	Time Trackers	
1989	Trained to Kill	
1989	DeepStar Six	
1989	House III: The Horror Show	
1990	Backstreet Dreams	
1990	The Closer	
1990	Leatherface: The Texas Chainsaw Massacre III	Leatherface Stunt Double
1991	Nothing but Trouble	
1991	Zandalee	
1991	The Rapture	
1991	FBI: The Untold Stories	TV series
1991	9½ Ninjas!	
1991	Out for Justice	
1991	Dangerous Women	TV series
1991	Ghoulies III: Ghoulies Go to College	
1991	The Rapture	
1991	The Last Boy Scout	
1992	Roots of Evil	
1992	Lethal Weapon 3	Uncredited
1992	House IV	
1992	Double Trouble	
1992	Waxwork II: Lost in Time	
1992	Live! From Death Row	TV movie
1992	Under Siege	
1993	Hocus Pocus	
1993	Addams Family Values	
1993	Jason Goes to Hell: The Final Friday	
1993	Father Hood	
1993	Demolition Man	
1993	Younger & Younger	
1994	Blood Run	TV movie
1994	The Secret World of Alex Mack	TV series
1994	A Low Down Dirty Shame	
1995	Batman Forever	Uncredited
1995	Just Cause	
1995	Project Metalbeast	
1995	Four Rooms	
1995	Seven	
1995	Fair Game	
1996	Warhead	
1996	Wildly Available	
1996	L.A. Heat	TV series
1996	Best of the Best 3: No Turning Back	
1996	The Fan	
1996	Marshal Law	TV movie
1997	The Big Fall	
1997	Brittle Glory	
1997	Spawn	
1997	Fire Down Below	
1997	Team Knight Rider	TV series
1997	Most Wanted	
1997	The Shooter	
1997	The Underground	
1997	Wishmaster	
1997	The Protector	
1998	Martial Law	TV series (uncredited)
1998	The Shadow Men	
1998	Children of the Corn V: Fields of Terror	
1998	Black Thunder	
1998	A Night at the Roxbury	
1998	Enemy of the State	
1999	Hitman's Run	
1999	See How They Run	TV series
1999	Idle Hands	Uncredited
2000	Robbers	
2000	Partners	TV movie
2000	Gone in 60 Seconds	
2002	Comic Book Villains	
2002	Slackers	
2003	Charmed	TV series
2003	Monster	
2003	Daredevil	
2005	The Devil's Rejects	
2006	Fallen Angels	Also associate producer
2006	Hatchet	
2007	Hack!	
2007	Ed Gein: The Butcher of Plainfield	
2008	Ghost Town	
2009	Old Habits Die Hard	
2010	Frozen	
2010	Hatchet II	
2011	The Afflicted	
2011	Monster Theatre Volume 1	
2011	The Family	
2013	Hatchet III	
2014	Charlie's Farm	
2015	Old 37	
2017	Check Point	
2017	Friday the 13th: The Game	Video game motion capture choreography and stunts
2017	Victor Crowley	
2019	Hanukkah	
2020	Impractical Jokers: The Movie	
2023	The Texas Chain Saw Massacre	Video game motion capture choreography and stunts
