= They Turned Us Into Killers =

2024 horror film

- Directed by: Thomas Walton
- Written by: Thomas Walton
- Produced by: Jared Safier; Thomas Walton
- Starring: Scout Taylor-Compton; Taryn Manning; Kane Hodder; Brian Anthony Wilson; Brandon Irons; Lauren Francesca; Bryce Draper
- Cinematography: Russ Jaquith
- Edited by: George Lambriodes; Navid Sanati
- Music by: Reuven Herman
- Production companies: PhilaDreams Films; Safier Entertainment; Stag Mountain Films
- Distributed by: Gravitas Ventures
- Release date: 2024
- Running time: 86 minutes
- Country: United States
- Language: English

They Turned Us Into Killers is a 2024 American horror film written and directed by Thomas Walton. The film tells the story of a young woman who is driven to suicide by an abusive boyfriend, and her best friend who sets out to avenge her death.

== Cast ==
- Scout Taylor-Compton as Star
- Taryn Manning as Macie
- Kane Hodder as Beau Sr.
- Brian Anthony Wilson as Zion
- Brandon Irons as Travis
- Lauren Francesca as Karma
- Bryce Draper as BJ

== Release ==
In, 2024 the film was released on VOD platforms and Blu-ray.

== Reception ==
=== Critical response ===
Tyler Doupe' of Dread Central wrote, "All in all, I get the impression that Walton’s heart was in the right place. And I think that’s commendable. But the execution leaves much to be desired."
